= Herman Wrangel (diplomat) =

Swedish diplomat and politician (1857–1934)

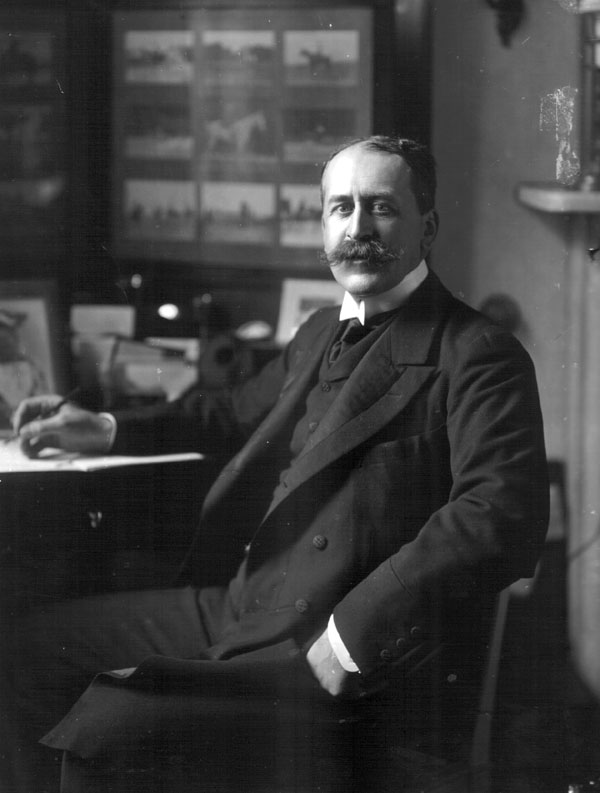
- Wrangel in 1907

Minister for Foreign Affairs
- In office 27 October 1920 – 13 October 1921
- Prime Minister: Louis De Geer; Oscar von Sydow
- Preceded by: Erik Palmstierna
- Succeeded by: Hjalmar Branting

Envoy Extraordinary and Minister Plenipotentiary of the King of Sweden at the Court of St James'
- In office 1906–1920
- Preceded by: Carl Bildt
- Succeeded by: Erik Palmstierna

Envoy Extraordinary and Minister Plenipotentiary of the King of Sweden at Saint Petersburg
- In office 1904–1906
- Preceded by: August Gyldenstolpe
- Succeeded by: Edvard Brändström

Envoy Extraordinary and Minister Plenipotentiary of the King of Sweden and Norway at Brussels and The Haag
- In office 1900–1904
- Preceded by: August Gyldenstolpe
- Succeeded by: Gustaf Falkenberg

Personal details
- Born: 13 August 1857 Salsta Palace, Uppland, Sweden
- Died: 9 October 1934 (aged 77) Stockholm
- Party: independent
- Spouse: Charlotte Baour
- Children: Oskar Fredrik Ulrik Louis Wrangel af Sauss

Count Anton Magnus Herman Wrangel af Sauss (13 August 1857 – 9 October 1934) was a Swedish diplomat. He served as Envoy Extraordinary and Minister Plenipotentiary of the King of Sweden at the Court of St James' between 1906 and 1920 and as Minister for Foreign Affairs in the cabinets of Louis De Geer and Oscar von Sydow between 1920 and 1921.

== Life and work ==
Herman Wrangel was born, into the Wrangel family, at Salsta Palace in Uppland, Sweden, the son of Count Fredrik Ulrik Wrangel af Sauss and the Countess Ulrika Ebba Vilhelmina Sprengtporten.

Wrangel was attaché at the Ministry for Foreign Affairs, serving in Copenhagen and Paris 1884. He was made second secretary at the Ministry for Foreign Affairs 1885, chamberlain and acting vice master of ceremonies 1887, first secretary at the Ministry for Foreign Affairs 1889, acting secretary of the Swedish legation in Paris 1890–1896 and then secretary in Paris 1896–1900, Envoy Extraordinary and Minister Plenipotentiary at Brussels and The Hague 1900, at Saint Petersburg 1904, and at London 1906. Minister for Foreign Affairs 1920–1921.

Accompanied King Oscar II on several of his travels abroad. Was secretary of the Swedish-Norwegian delegation at the International Factory and Mine Labour Conference in Berlin 1890 and envoy of Sweden at the Paris Peace Conference in 1919.

He married in 1893 in Bordeaux, France, Louise Charlotte Suzanne Baour (1869–1940) the daughter of Charles Baour, a wealthy wine producer and prominent landowner (the Baour family was one of the most powerful and affluent merchant families in the Bordeaux region during the 18th and 19th centuries), and his wife Marguerite Guestier (granddaughter of Deputy Pierre-François Guestier, Peer of France). Their son Oskar Fredrik Ulrik Louis Wrangel af Sauss was born in Paris on 23 January 1895, and died unmarried at the age of 32 at Château de Villambis in France on 9 January 1928.

== Ancestry ==
Ancestors of Herman Wrangel

16. Anton Johan Wrangel af Sauss
8. Anton Johan Wrangel af Sauss
17. Katarina Sofia Kruuse
4. Fredrik Ulrik Wrangel af Sauss
18. Erik Arvid Sparre af Söfdeborg
9. Charlotta Regina Sparre af Söfdeborg
19. Charlotta Eleonora Siöblad
2. Fredrik Ulrik Wrangel af Sauss
20. Casper Ehrenborg
10. Daniel Isak Ehrenborg
21. Elisabet Eufrosyne von Conowen
5. Ulrika Lovisa Ehrenborg
22. Christian Joakim Klingspor
11. Hedvig Ulrika Lovisa Klingspor
23. Helena Christina de Besche
1. Anton Magnus Herman Wrangel af Sauss
24. Magnus Vilhelm Sprengtporten
12. Johan Vilhelm Sprengtporten
25. Anna Margareta Ammorin
6. Jakob Wilhelm Sprengtporten
26. Carl Gustaf Mörner af Morlanda
13. Sophia Lovisa Mörner af Morlanda
27. Sofia Elisabet Steuch
3. Ulrika Ebba Vilhelmina Sprengtporten
28. Erik Brahe
14. Magnus Fredrik Brahe
29. Christina Charlotta Piper
7. Ulrika Wilhelmina Brahe
30. Otto Anders Koskull
15. Aurora Wilhelmina Koskull
31. Amalia Beata Silfversparre

Diplomatic posts
Preceded by August Gyldenstolpe	Envoy of Sweden to the Netherlands; 1900–1904	Succeeded by Gustaf Falkenberg
Preceded by August Gyldenstolpe	Envoy of Sweden to Belgium; 1900–1904	Succeeded by Gustaf Falkenberg
Preceded by August Gyldenstolpe	Envoy of Sweden to Russia; 1904–1906	Succeeded by Edvard Brändström
Preceded by Carl Bildt	Envoy of Sweden to the United Kingdom; 1906–1920	Succeeded by Erik Palmstierna
