= List of ambassadors of Sweden to the Netherlands =

Ambassador of Sweden to the Netherlands
- Lesser coat of arms of the Kingdom of Sweden
- Incumbent; Julius Liljeström since 2025
- Ministry for Foreign Affairs; Swedish Embassy, The Hague
- Style: His or Her Excellency (formal); Mr. or Madam Ambassador (informal)
- Reports to: Minister for Foreign Affairs
- Residence: Lange Voorhout 28
- Seat: The Hague, Netherlands
- Appointer: Government of Sweden
- Term length: No fixed term
- Inaugural holder: Jacob van Dijck
- Formation: 1614
- Website: Swedish Embassy, The Hague

The Ambassador of Sweden to the Netherlands (known formally as the Ambassador of the Kingdom of Sweden to the Kingdom of the Netherlands) is the official representative of the government of Sweden to the monarch and government of the Netherlands.

== History ==
In September 1956, an agreement was reached between the Swedish and Dutch governments on the mutual elevation of the respective countries' legations to embassies. The diplomatic rank was thereafter changed to ambassador instead of envoy extraordinary and minister plenipotentiary.

== List of representatives ==
| Name | Period | Title | Notes | Ref |
Dutch Republic (1588–1795)
| Jacob van Dijck | 28 July 1614 – 3 June 1620 | Ambassador | | |
| Nils Gyldenstolpe | 8 March 1679 – 27 October 1679 | Envoy Extraordinary | | |
| Nils Gyldenstolpe | 28 October 1679 – 1687 | Envoy | | |
| Nils Lillieroot | 9 October 1691 – 1695 | Envoy | | |
| Joachim Fredrik Preis | 31 October 1721 (Note: Declined the appointment.) | Envoy | | |
| Joachim Fredrik Preis | 16 August 1725 (Note: Received a new letter of credence on 4 April 1751.) – 22 December 1759 | Envoy | Died in office. | |
| Carl Johan Creutz | 21 January 1760 – 16 March 1775 | Envoy | | |
| Emanuel De Geer | 16 March 1775 – 14 October 1779 | Envoy | | |
| Gustaf Johan Ehrensvärd | 17 January 1780 – 1782 | Envoy | | |
| Pehr Olof von Asp | 1782–1783 | Chargé d'affaires ad interim | | |
| Carl Gustaf Schultz von Ascheraden | 8 April 1783 – 18 June 1787 | Envoy | | |
| Mårten Bunge | July 1785 – April 1786 | Chargé d'affaires | | |
| Mårten Bunge | June 1787 – May 1789 | Chargé d'affaires | | |
| Fredrik Adolf Löwenhielm | 1789–1795 | Envoy | | |
Batavian Republic (1795–1806)
| Fredrik Adolf Löwenhielm | 1795–1806 | Envoy | | |
| Anders Fredrik Reuterswärd | 1796–1801 | Chargé d'affaires ad interim | | |
Kingdom of Holland (1806–1810)
First French Empire (1804–1814)
| Gustaf Algernon Stierneld | 3 October 1814 – 1815 | Chargé d'affaires | | |
United Kingdom of the Netherlands (1815–1839)
| Gustaf Algernon Stierneld | 1815–1818 | Chargé d'affaires | | |
| Abraham Constantin Mouradgea d'Ohsson | October 1816 – 1834 | Envoy | | |
| Carl Hochschild | 30 November 1818 – 1819 | Chargé d'affaires | | |
| Carl Hochschild | 13 July 1836 – 1839 | Envoy | | |
Kingdom of the Netherlands (1839–present)
| Carl Hochschild | 1839 – 7 May 1841 | Envoy | | |
| Edvard Gabriel Gyldenstolpe | 7 May 1841 – ? | Chargé d'affaires | | |
| Axel von Wahrendorff | 2 October 1843 – 30 December 1847 | Chargé d'affaires | | |
| Carl von und zu Mansbach | 1847–1851 | Envoy | | |
| Wilhelm af Wetterstedt | 8 May 1851 – 1852 | Chargé d'affaires ad interim | | |
| Adam Christopher Løvenskiold | 1851–1856 | Minister plenipotentiary | | |
| Adam Christopher Løvenskiold | 1856–1858 | Envoy | | |
| Christian Adolf Virgin | 16 December 1858 – 23 November 1860 | Envoy | | |
| Wilhelm af Wetterstedt | 23 November 1860 – 1864 | Envoy Extraordinary and Minister Plenipotentiary | | |
| Carl Fredrik Palmstierna | 1864–1865 | Resident minister | | |
| Ludvig Fredrik Ernst (Louis) Wrede | 17 November 1865 – 15 April 1869 | Resident minister | | |
| Oluf Stenersen | 1869–1870 | Resident minister | Accredited from the Swedish legation in Brussels. | |
| Carl Burenstam | 13 October 1870 – 1884 | Resident minister | Accredited from the Swedish legation in Brussels. | |
| Carl Burenstam | 18 April 1884 – 6 September 1895 | Minister plenipotentiary | Accredited from the Swedish legation in Brussels. | |
| August Gyldenstolpe | 1895–1896 | Acting minister plenipotentiary | Accredited from the Swedish legation in Brussels. | |
| August Gyldenstolpe | 1896–1899 | Minister plenipotentiary | Accredited from the Swedish legation in Brussels. | |
| Joachim Beck-Friis | 16 December 1899 – 16 September 1900 | Chargé d'affaires | Accredited from the Swedish legation in Brussels. | |
| Herman Wrangel | 26 June 1901 – 1904 | Envoy | Accredited from the Swedish legation in Brussels. | |
| Gustaf Falkenberg | 9 June 1905 – 1908 | Envoy and consul general (Note: Consul general for Belgium from 28 September 1906 to 17 June 1908.) | Accredited from the Swedish legation in Brussels. | |
| Albert Ehrensvärd | 17 June 1908 – 1910 | Envoy and consul general (Note: Consul general for Belgium from 17 June 1908 to 8 October 1910.) | Accredited from the Swedish legation in Brussels. | |
| Carl Otto Blomstedt | 18 August 1908 – 11 October 1908 | Chargé d'affaires | Accredited from the Swedish legation in Brussels. | |
| Fredrik af Klercker | 1910–1921 | Envoy | Accredited from the Swedish legation in Brussels. | |
| Gustaf von Dardel | 21 November 1919 – 2 March 1921 | Chargé d'affaires ad interim and extra first legation secretary | Minister plenipotentiary on 21 November 1919. | |
| Gustaf Westman | 1921–1922 | Envoy | | |
| Patrick Adlercreutz | 9 June 1922 – 1937 | Envoy | | |
| Erik Sjöborg | 1937 – 31 March 1944 | Envoy | To the Dutch government-in-exile in London (from 1944). | |
| Olof Ripa | 1941–1941 | Chargé d'affaires ad interim | | |
| Gunnar Hägglöf | 1 April 1944 – 1945 | Envoy | To the Dutch government-in-exile in London. | |
| Hugo Tamm | 1945–1946 | First legation secretary/Chargé d'affaires ad interim | | |
| Joen Lagerberg | 28 June 1946 – 1952 | Envoy | | |
| Sven Dahlman | 1953–1956 | Envoy | | |
| Sven Dahlman | 1956–1961 | Ambassador | | |
| Brynolf Eng | 1961–1965 | Ambassador | | |
| Jens Malling | 1966 – 25 January 1969 | Ambassador | Died in office. | |
| Lars-Olof Brilioth | 1969–1969 | Chargé d'affaires | | |
| Karl-Gustav Lagerfelt | 1969–1972 | Ambassador | | |
| Tord Hagen | 1972–1977 | Ambassador | | |
| Nils-Olov Hasslev | 1977–1983 | Ambassador | | |
| Carl-Henric Nauckhoff | 1983–1984 | Ambassador | | |
| Hans Danelius | 1984–1988 | Ambassador | | |
| Göte Magnusson | 1988–1992 | Ambassador | | |
| Jan af Sillén | 1992–1996 | Ambassador | | |
| Lennart Alvin | 1996–2000 | Ambassador | | |
| Björn Skala | 2000–2005 | Ambassador | | |
| Hans Magnusson | 2005–2010 | Ambassador | | |
| Håkan Emsgård | 2010–2015 | Ambassador | | |
| Per Holmström | 2015–2018 | Ambassador | | |
| Annika Markovic | 1 September 2018 – 2021 | Ambassador | | |
| Johannes Oljelund | 2021–2025 | Ambassador | | |
| Julius Liljeström | 2025–present | Ambassador | | |

== Gallery ==
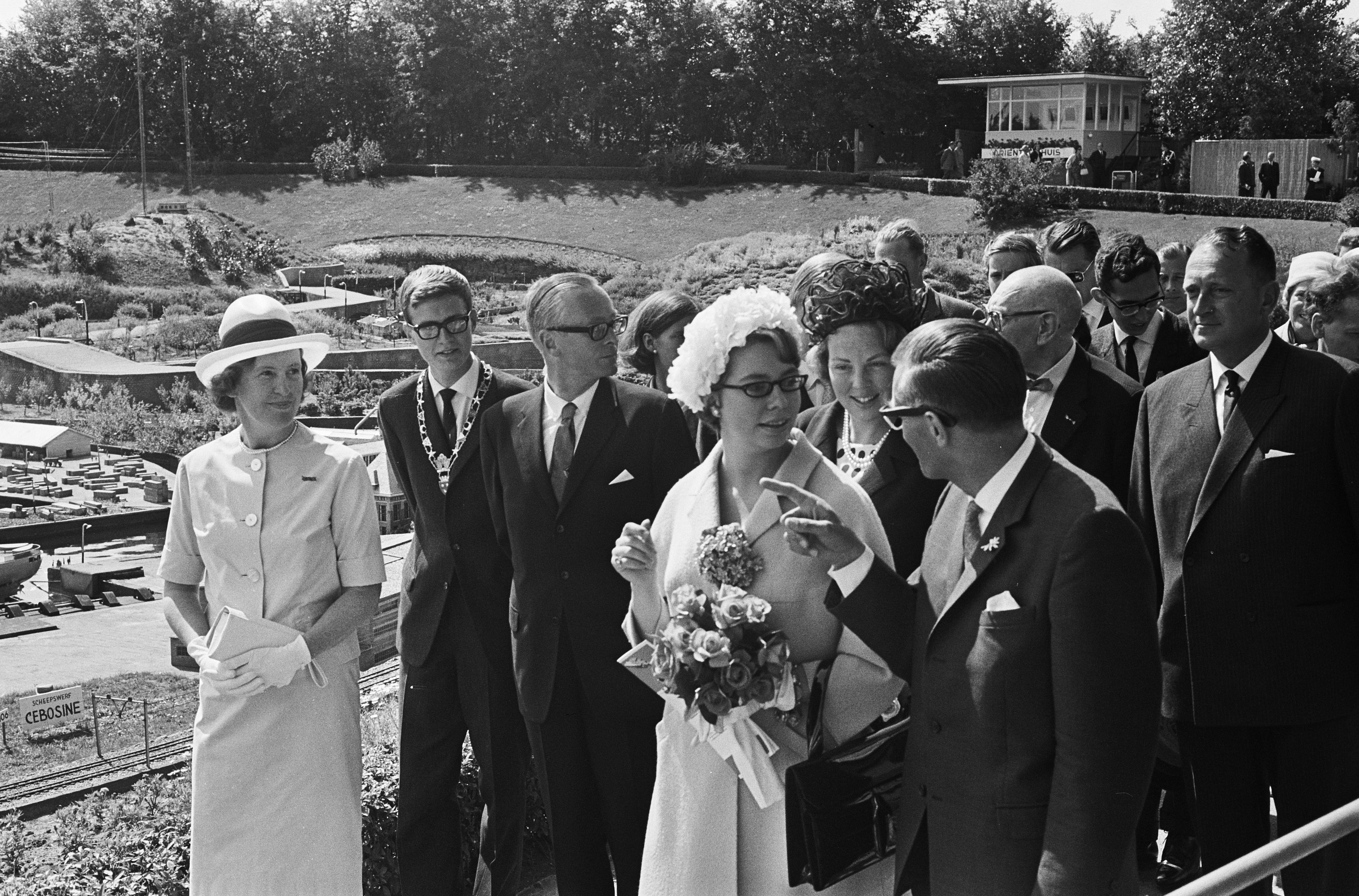
Ambassador Brynolf Eng in Madurodam in 1964

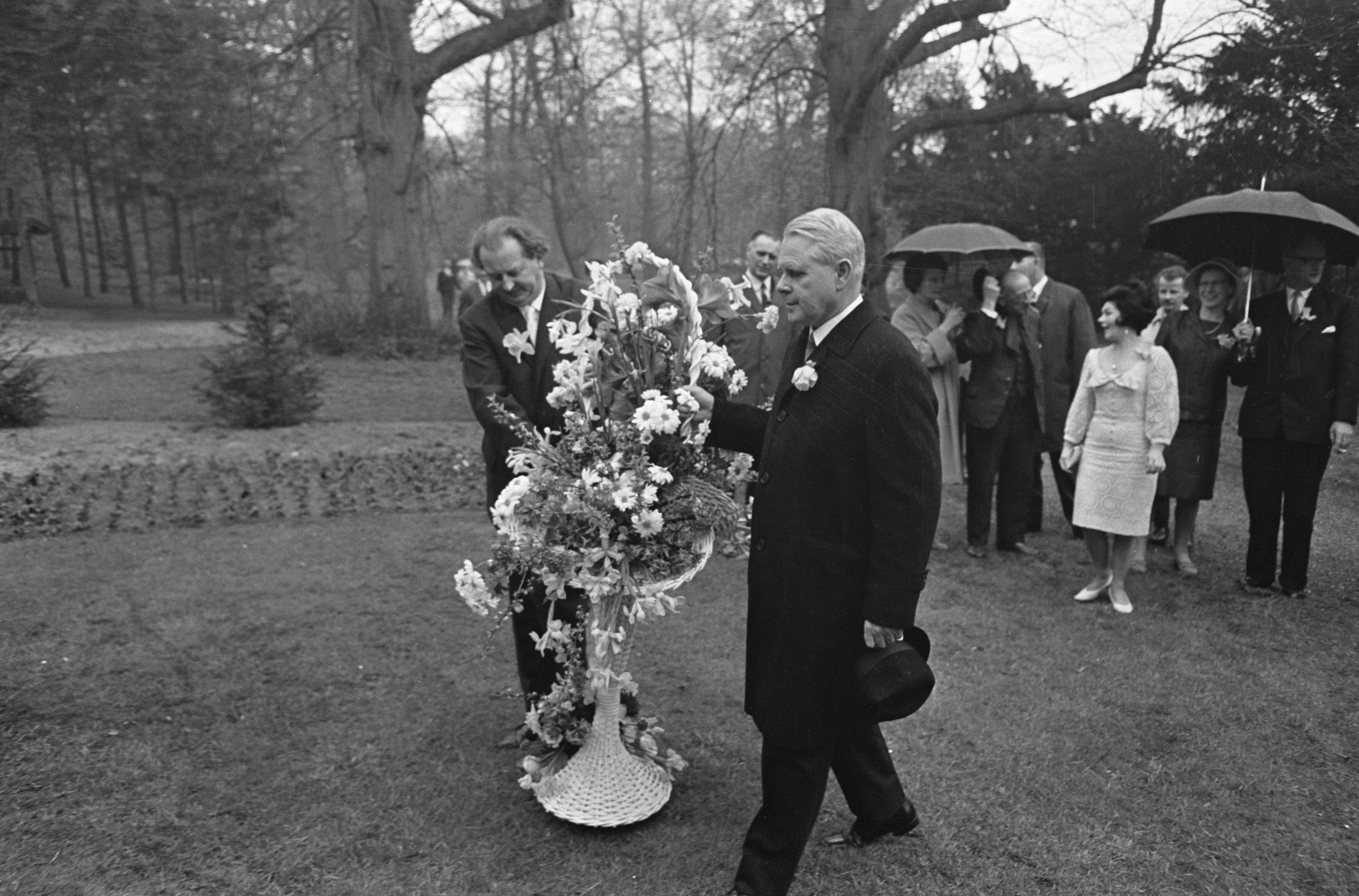
Ambassador Jens Malling in 1966

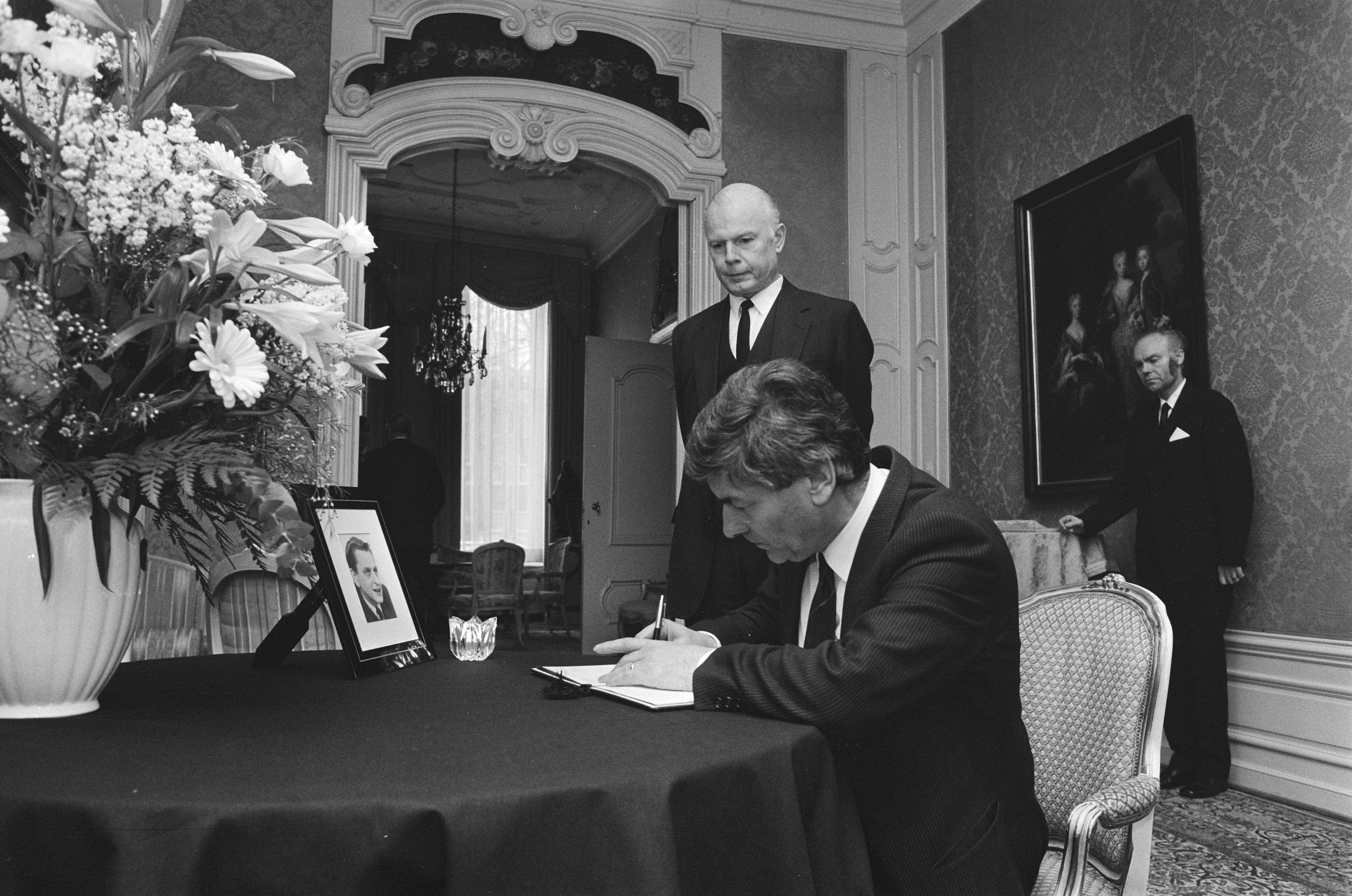
Ambassador Hans Danelius in 1986

== See also ==
- Netherlands–Sweden relations
- Embassy of Sweden, The Hague
