= List of ambassadors of Sweden to Belgium =

Ambassador of Sweden to Belgium
- Lesser coat of arms of the Kingdom of Sweden

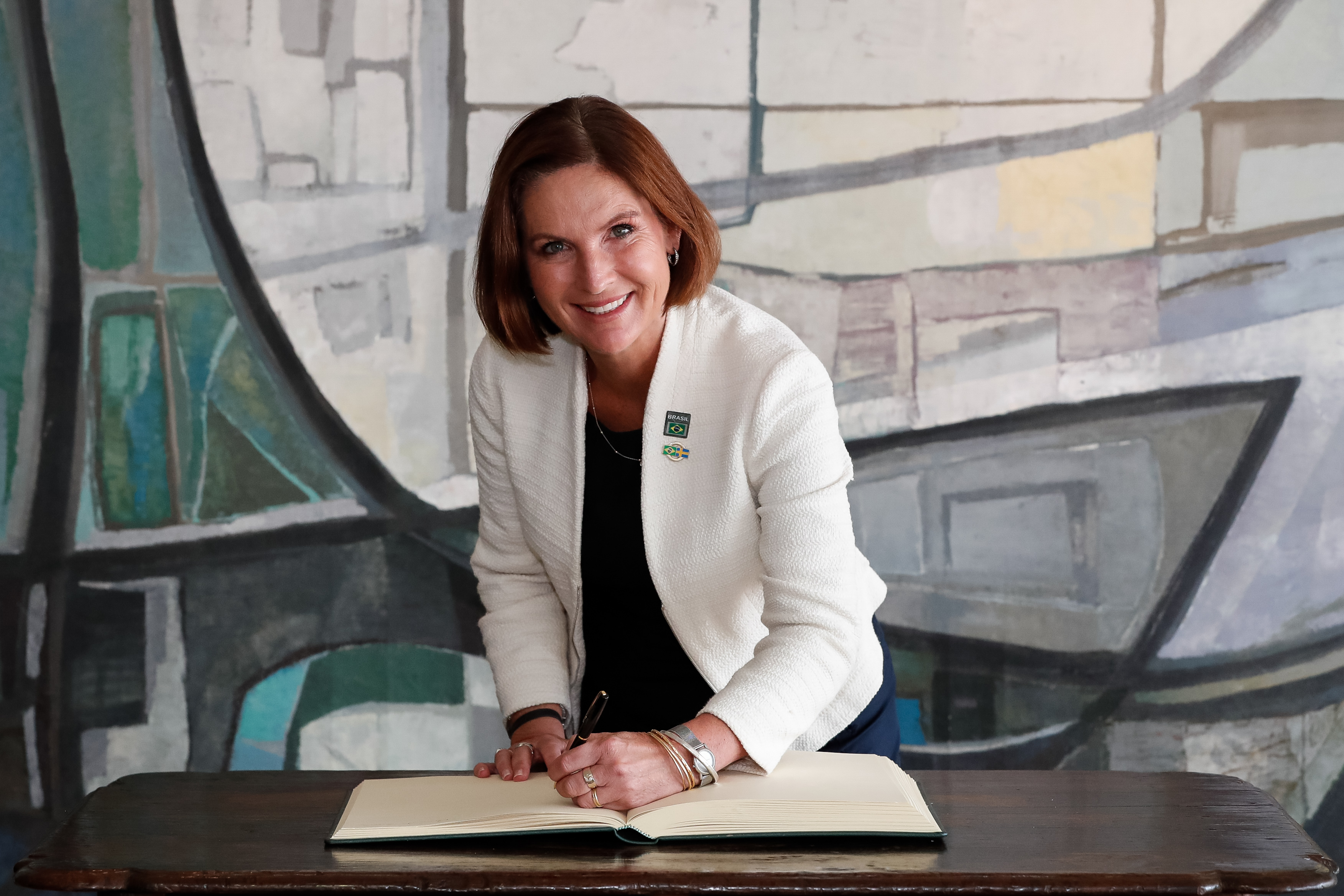
- Incumbent; Johanna Brismar Skoog since 2025
- Ministry for Foreign Affairs; Swedish Embassy, Brussels
- Style: His or Her Excellency (formal); Mr. or Madam Ambassador (informal)
- Reports to: Minister for Foreign Affairs
- Residence: Avenue Géo Bernier 13, Ixelles
- Seat: Brussels, Belgium
- Appointer: Government of Sweden
- Term length: No fixed term
- Inaugural holder: Axel von Wahrendorff
- Formation: 1837

The Ambassador of Sweden to Belgium (known formally as the Ambassador of the Kingdom of Sweden to the Kingdom of Belgium) is the official representative of the government of Sweden to the monarch and government of Belgium.

== History ==
The Swedish diplomatic mission in Belgium was established in 1837. From 1869 to 1895, the mission was shared with The Hague, Netherlands, located in the latter city and covering both states. Until 1921, the envoy in Brussels had a dual accreditation in The Hague.

In March 1956, an agreement was reached between the Swedish and Belgian governments on the mutual elevation of the respective countries' legations to embassies. The diplomatic rank was thereafter changed to ambassador instead of envoy extraordinary and minister plenipotentiary.

The Swedish embassy closed in 2011 and from then a Stockholm-based ambassador has been responsible for the bilateral relations between Sweden and Belgium. The embassy was re-established on 1 September 2025 which is now headed by a resident ambassador.

== List of representatives ==
Name	Period	Title	Resident / Concurrent accreditation	Notes	Presented credentials	Ref
Axel von Wahrendorff	11 September 1837 – 20 May 1851	Chargé d'affaires	Also accredited to The Hague (Note: Dual accreditation to The Hague 2 October 1843 – 30 December 1847.)	Died in office.		
Fredrik Hartvig Anton Ferdinand Baron af Wedel-Jarlsberg	1852–1856	Chargé d'affaires				
Carl August Järta	29 July 1856–1857	Chargé d'affaires				
Carl August Järta	23 October 1857 – 1858	Resident minister		Also resident minister in Nassau on 16 January 1857.		
Karl Adalbert von Mansbach	1859–1868	Resident minister				
Oluf Stenersen	1869–1870	Resident minister	Also accredited to The Hague			
Carl Burenstam	13 October 1870 – 1884	Resident minister	Also accredited to The Hague			
Carl Burenstam	18 April 1884 – 6 September 1895	Minister plenipotentiary	Also accredited to The Hague			
August Gyldenstolpe	1895–1896	Acting minister plenipotentiary	Also accredited to The Hague			
August Gyldenstolpe	1896–1899	Minister plenipotentiary	Also accredited to The Hague			
Joachim Beck-Friis	16 December 1899 – 16 September 1900	Chargé d'affaires	Also accredited to The Hague			
Herman Wrangel	1900–1904	Envoy	Also accredited to The Hague			
Gustaf Falkenberg	9 June 1905 – 1908	Envoy and consul general	Also accredited to The Hague			
Albert Ehrensvärd	17 June 1908 – 1910	Envoy and consul general	Also accredited to The Hague			
Carl Otto Blomstedt	18 August 1908 – 11 October 1908	Chargé d'affaires	Also accredited to The Hague			
Fredrik af Klercker	1910–1921	Envoy	Also accredited to The Hague			
Gustaf von Dardel	14 January 1921 – 1941	Envoy	Also accredited to Luxembourg City (from 27 October 1922)			
Widar Bagge	1922–1923	Chargé d'affaires ad interim				
–	1942–1944	–		Vacant		
Gunnar Hägglöf	1 April 1944 – 1945	Envoy		To the Belgian government in exile and Dutch government-in-exile.		
Einar Modig	7 December 1945 (Note: Assumed office on 1 April 1946.) – 1948	Envoy	Also accredited to Luxembourg City (29 March 1946 – 1948)			
Gunnar Reuterskiöld	1948–1956	Envoy	Also accredited to Luxembourg City			
Gunnar Reuterskiöld	2 March 1956 – 1956	Ambassador	Also accredited to Luxembourg City			
Hugo Wistrand	1956–1961	Ambassador	Also accredited to Luxembourg City			
Stig Unger	1961–1965	Ambassador	Also accredited to Luxembourg City			
Tage Grönwall	1965–1969	Ambassador	Also accredited to Luxembourg City			
Tord Göransson	1969–1976	Ambassador	Also accredited to Luxembourg City			
Lars von Celsing	1976–1979	Ambassador	Also accredited to Luxembourg City			
Jean-Jacques von Dardel	1979–1984	Ambassador	Also accredited to Luxembourg City			
Kaj Sundberg	1984–1989	Ambassador	Also accredited to Luxembourg City			
Henrik Liljegren	1989–1992	Ambassador	Also accredited to Luxembourg City			
Göran Berg	1992–1998	Ambassador	Also accredited to Luxembourg City (until 1995)			
Anders Oljelund	1998–2003	Ambassador				
Herman af Trolle	2003–2007	Ambassador				
Magnus Robach	2007–2011	Ambassador	Also accredited to Luxembourg City (from 2010)			
Ulrika Sundberg	2011–2014	Ambassador				
Maria Christina Lundqvist	2014–2016	Ambassador				
Annika Hahn-Englund	2016–2021	Ambassador	Resident in Stockholm			
Annika Molin Hellgren	2021–2024	Ambassador	Resident in Stockholm			
Henric Råsbrant	24 October 2024 – 2025	Ambassador	Resident in Stockholm			
Johanna Brismar Skoog	2025–present	Ambassador	Also accredited to Luxembourg City		9 October 2025	

== See also ==
- Embassy of Sweden, Brussels
