= Ebba Palmstierna =

Swedish writer and suffragette

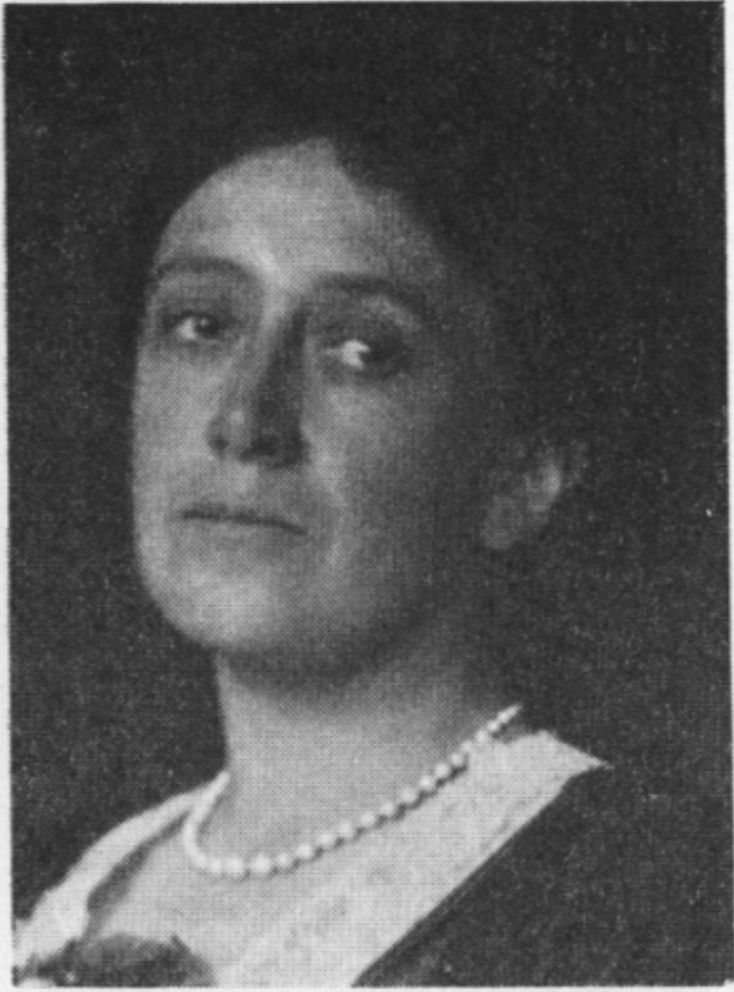
Ebba Palmstierna in 1920

Ebba Margareta Palmstierna, born Carlheim-Gyllensköld (27 August 1877 – 9 October 1966) was a Swedish noblewoman and suffragette.

== Life ==
Palmstierna was born in 1877. She was the daughter of the commander Alfred Edvard Rutger Carlheim-Gyllensköld and of Maria Elisabet Christina Ehrenborg. In 1899, she married Erik Kule Palmstierna (1877–1959), with whom she had several children, one of them Carl-Fredrik Palmstierna. She was active in the National Association for Women's Suffrage in Karlskrona and was in the board of the Karlskrona association that gathered signatures for a 1905 petition for women's suffrage. She was also one of the signatories on this petition. In 1917, she was a board member on a national level for the National Association for Women's Suffrage, together with Signe Bergman, Karolina Widerström, Gulli Petrini and Ester Brisman.

Palmstierna was also involved in the suffrage movement's civic education activities. In 1916, she wrote about the Bergman-Österberg civic education courses, describing plans to expand the programme and combine instruction with efforts to establish and support local suffrage associations. At the association's national meeting reported in 1917, she presented an account of the courses' expansion and attendance. In 1919, she served with Ann-Margret Holmgren and Ester Brisman on the editorial committee of Rösträtt för kvinnor, the journal published by the National Association for Women's Suffrage.

Palmstierna wrote down her memoirs during her lifetime. They were published in 1973 posthumous in two volumes, one of them ranging from 1877 until 1905 and another one from 1907 until 1922.
