= Gustaf Falkenberg =

Swedish diplomat (1860–1917)

Baron Gustaf Falkenberg
- Born: Gustaf Mikael Melker Falkenberg; 29 September 1860; Mörarp, Sweden
- Died: 26 August 1917 (aged 56); Copenhagen, Denmark
- Education: Lund University
- Occupation: Diplomat
- Years active: 1885–1917
- Spouse: Elisabet Hegel (m. 1908)
- Relatives: Claes Rålamb (great-great-great-great-grandfather)

Baron Gustaf Mikael Melker Falkenberg af Trystorp (29 September 1860 – 26 August 1917) was a Swedish diplomat who served in several major European capitals throughout his career. After studying law at Lund University, he joined the Swedish Ministry for Foreign Affairs in 1886 and began his diplomatic service in Paris. He subsequently held positions in Saint Petersburg and Copenhagen, gaining experience in diplomatic administration and international relations.

In 1905, Falkenberg was appointed envoy extraordinary and minister plenipotentiary to Belgium and the Netherlands, representing Sweden at several international conferences on maritime law, trade, and the regulation of imports into Africa. In 1908, he became Sweden's envoy to Norway, where he played a prominent role in negotiations concerning the Spitsbergen Question in 1910, serving as Sweden's principal representative. In 1913, he was appointed envoy to Spain and Portugal, positions he held until his death in 1917.

== Early life ==
Gustaf Falkenberg was born on 29 September 1860 at Marielund Manor, north of Mörarp, in what is now Helsingborg Municipality, Sweden. He belonged to the noble Falkenberg af Trystorp family and was the son of cavalry captain Baron Melker Fredrik Falkenberg (1828–1902) and Baroness Ebba Gundborg Hedvig Gabriella Rålamb (1835–1909). Gustaf had an older brother who died in infancy and a younger brother who also died young, at the age of 17.

His paternal great-grandfather was Baron Göran Henrik Falkenberg (1746–1803), who served as a county governor. On his mother's side, his grandfather was Baron Anders Rålamb (1790–1872), a royal master of the hunt. His maternal great-grandfather was Baron Sigfrid Rålamb (1753–1841), a cavalry officer, draughtsman, and watercolourist. The family lineage also included Baron Claes Gustaf Rålamb (1705–1765), a civil servant; Baron Gustaf Rålamb (1675–1750), a county governor; and Baron Claes Rålamb (1622–1698), who served as a county governor and a member of the Council of the Realm. Further back in the family tree were the civil servant Broor Andersson (Rålamb) (1568–1647) and Anders Sigfridsson (1527–1581), regarded as the progenitor of the noble Rålamb family.

Falkenberg completed his secondary education (mogenhetsexamen) on 6 June 1878 and enrolled at Lund University in June of the same year. He passed his examination in legal philosophy (juris filosofie examen) on 14 December 1880, his administrative law examination (kansliexamen) on 14 December 1883, and his examination qualifying him for service in the judiciary (hovrättsexamen) on 13 December 1884.

== Career ==
Falkenberg served as a judicial trainee (auskultant) at the Scania and Blekinge Court of Appeal in January 1885. He was appointed attaché on 18 December 1885 and began serving in the Swedish Ministry for Foreign Affairs on 3 April 1886. On 30 November 1886, he was appointed attaché in Paris, followed by an appointment as second secretary at the Ministry for Foreign Affairs on 15 February 1888.

In September 1889, he was employed by the Persian ambassador, Mirza Mohsen Khan Moshir od-Dowleh, during the latter's stay in Stockholm. On 5 October 1890, Falkenberg was appointed acting first secretary at the Ministry for Foreign Affairs. He was appointed secretary of legation in Saint Petersburg on 16 June 1894 and took up the post on 7 January 1895.

On 12 November 1897, he became head of a department at the Ministry for Foreign Affairs. From 1 December 1897 to 26 July 1898, he was in charge of the Ministry's Trade and Consular Department. He then served as chargé d'affaires ad interim in Saint Petersburg from 11 August to 9 November 1898, and again from 2 May 1899. He was appointed counsellor of legation on 29 June 1900 and took up a post at the Swedish legation in Copenhagen on 5 January 1901.

On 15 November 1904, Falkenberg was appointed chargé d'affaires ad interim in Vienna. On 9 June 1905, he was appointed envoy extraordinary and minister plenipotentiary to the Belgian and Dutch courts. While serving in Brussels, he represented Sweden at several international conferences, including the Maritime Law Conference, the Sugar Conference of 1907, and conferences concerning the importation of spirits and firearms into Africa.

On 17 June 1908, he was appointed envoy extraordinary and minister plenipotentiary to the Norwegian court. During his time in Kristiania (now Oslo), he served as honorary chairman of the Swedish Society (Svenska sällskapet) and honorary president of the Swedish Relief Association (Svenska Hjelpföreningen). In 1910, he participated as Sweden's principal representative in negotiations concerning the Spitsbergen Question. He also represented Sweden in negotiations on the same issue in Kristiania on two occasions.

On 28 November 1913, Falkenberg was appointed envoy extraordinary and minister plenipotentiary to Madrid and Lisbon, a position he held until his death in 1917.

== Personal life ==
Falkenberg married Elisabet Julia Hegel in Copenhagen, Denmark, on 5 November 1908. It was her second marriage; she had previously married Danish chamberlain and cavalry captain Fredrik Ibsen (born 1864, died 1905) on 3 September 1897. Elisabet was born in Copenhagen on 1 August 1875, the daughter of Danish Councillor of State Jacob Hegel, owner of the Gyldendal publishing house, and Julie Bagge.

Following Falkenberg's death, Elisabet remarried on 30 April 1927 in Mörarp Parish, Malmöhus County, to Dr Karl Gustaf Edmond Lindholm (born 2 June 1885). The couple had no children and divorced in 1938. Elisabet died on 9 May 1956.

== Death ==
Falkenberg died on 26 August 1917 at the Finsen Institute in Copenhagen, Denmark. He had arrived in Copenhagen four months earlier, already suffering from a combination of heart and kidney disease. He was treated by a young specialist, Dr Öigaard, and his condition appeared to improve. Some time later, Falkenberg travelled to his estate, Marielund Manor, in Scania, where he became seriously ill on 25 August. An ambulance from Copenhagen was summoned, and he was transported back to the city and admitted to the Finsen Institute. By the time he arrived, his condition was already hopeless, and he died around midnight.

Falkenberg's funeral took place in Copenhagen on 1 September 1917. Sweden's Foreign Minister, Arvid Lindman, had requested that Envoy Ernst Günther represent him at the ceremony. Among those present was Count Robert De la Gardie, Governor of Malmöhus County. The pallbearers were Chamberlain Toll and industrialist Bock. On the same day, a funeral service was also held for Falkenberg at Mörarp Church in Scania. Among those attending were Günther and De la Gardie. The service began with the singing of a verse from a hymn, after which the parish priest, A. Sandegård, conducted the burial rites.

== Awards and decorations ==
=== Swedish ===
- (Sweden) Commander Grand Cross of the Order of the Polar Star (6 June 1915)
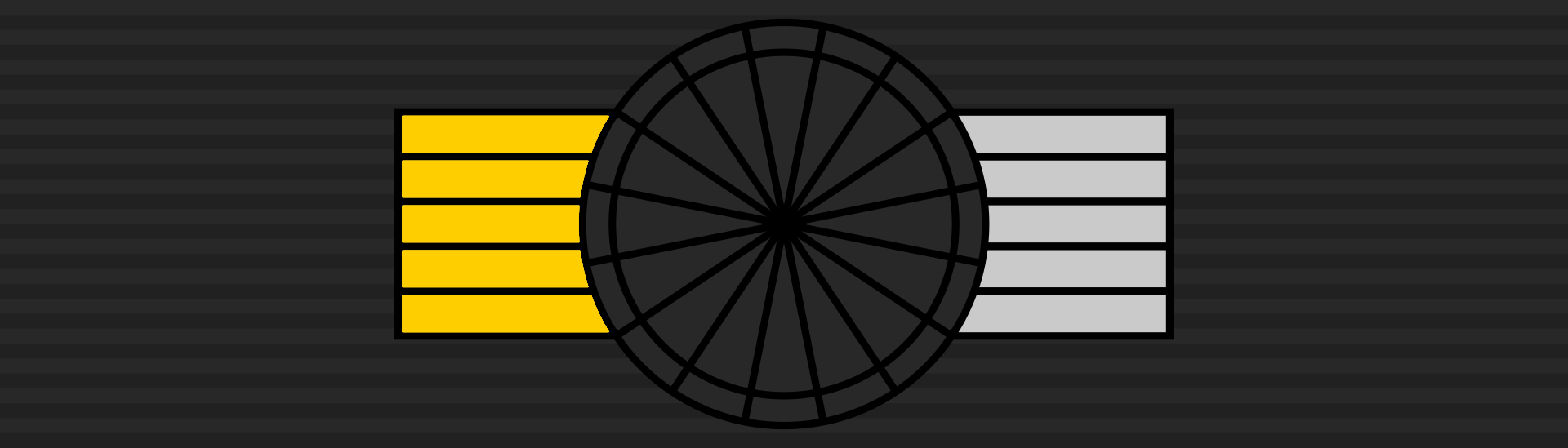
- (Sweden) Commander 1st Class of the Order of the Polar Star (1 December 1906)
- (Sweden) Knight of the Order of the Polar Star (18 September 1897)

=== Foreign ===
- (Norway) Grand Cross of the Order of St. Olav (1913)
- (Belgium) Grand Cross of the Order of Leopold (1909)
- (Netherlands) Grand Cross of the Order of Orange-Nassau (1909)
- (Denmark) Commander 1st Class of the Order of the Dannebrog (1906)
- (Pahlavi dynasty) 3rd Class of the Order of the Lion and the Sun (10 July 1890)
- (Thailand) 5th Class of the Order of the Crown of Siam (5 July 1891)
- (Russian Empire) Knight 2nd Class of the Order of Saint Anna (1898)
- (Russian Empire) Knight 3rd Class of the Order of Saint Anna (1892)
- (Russian Empire) Knight 2nd Class of the Order of Saint Stanislaus with star (January 1902)
- (Russian Empire) Knight 2nd Class of the Order of Saint Stanislaus (1895)
- (Norway) Knight of the Order of St. Olav (1 December 1904)

Diplomatic posts
Preceded by Herman Wrangel	Envoy of Sweden to Belgium; 1905–1908	Succeeded by Albert Ehrensvärd
Preceded by Herman Wrangel	Envoy of Sweden to the Netherlands; 1905–1908	Succeeded by Albert Ehrensvärd
Preceded by Ernst Günther	Envoy of Sweden to Norway; 1908–1913	Succeeded by Fredrik Ramel
Preceded by Carl Haraldsson Strömfelt	Envoy of Sweden to Spain; 1913–1917	Succeeded by Augustin Beck-Friis
Preceded by Carl Haraldsson Strömfelt	Envoy of Sweden to Portugal; 1913–1917	Succeeded by Augustin Beck-Friis
