= August Gyldenstolpe =

Swedish politician and diplomat (1849–1928)

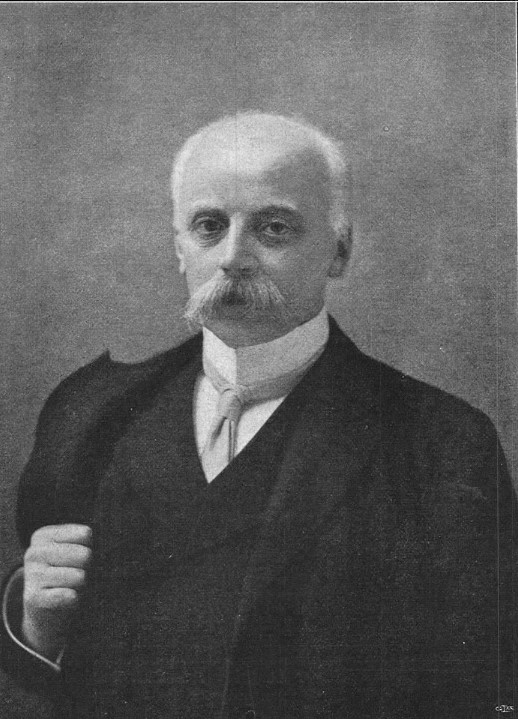

Minister of Foreign Affairs
- In office 22 December 1904 – 2 August 1905
- Monarch: Oscar II of Sweden
- Prime Minister: Erik Gustaf Boström; Johan Ramstedt
- Preceded by: Alfred Lagerheim
- Succeeded by: Fredrik Wachtmeister

Personal details
- Born: August Louis Fersen Gyldenstolpe; June 22, 1849 Stockholm, Sweden
- Died: June 30, 1928 (aged 79) Stockholm, Sweden
- Resting place: Norra begravningsplatsen
- Party: Independent politician
- Education: Uppsala University
- Occupation: Politician, diplomat

August Louis Fersen Gyldenstolpe (22 June 1849 – 30 June 1928) is a Swedish politician and diplomat who from 22 December 1904 until 2 August 1905 served as Minister of Foreign Affairs of Sweden.

== Early life, education ==
August Gyldenstolpe was born on 22 June 1849 in Stochholm. In 1873 he graduated from Uppsala University.

== Career ==
In 1874, he became an attaché at the Swedish embassy in Copenhagen. In the years 1876-1881 served in the apparatus of the Ministry of Foreign Affairs. In 1881, accompanied a special mission in Karlsruhe. Later he served in the embassy in the United States. In 1886 he became chancellor and head of the department.

In 1889 he became Secretary of the Cabinet. In 1895 he was appointed as acting envoy, and from 1897 to 1899 - Ambassador of the Swedish-Norwegian Union in the Netherlands and Belgium. In 1899-1904 - Ambassador to the Russian Empire.

After the resignation of the Foreign Minister Alfred Lagerheim, who was in conflict with Prime Minister Erik Gustaf Boström on the Norwegian issue, he was appointed Foreign Minister. He retained his position in the office of Johan Ramstedt.

On 2 August 1905 Fredrik Wachtmeister replaced Gyldenstolpe as Minister of Foreign Affairs.

From 1905 until 1918 he served as ambassador to France.

Government offices
Preceded by Carl Burenstam	Envoy of Sweden to the Netherlands; 1896–1899	Succeeded by Herman Wrangel
Preceded by Carl Burenstam	Envoy of Sweden to Belgium; 1896–1899	Succeeded by Herman Wrangel
Preceded by Gustaf Leonard (Lennart) Reuterskiöld	Envoy of Sweden to Russia; 1899–1904	Succeeded by Herman Wrangel
Preceded by Alfred Lagerheim	Minister for Foreign Affairs; 1904–1905	Succeeded by Fredrik Wachtmeister
