= Carl Hochschild =

Swedish diplomat

Carl Hochschild (3 October 1785 – 1 September 1857), was a Swedish baron and diplomat. He was the son of Rutger Fredrik Hochschild and father of Carl Fredrik Hochschild. After service in the Cabinet for Foreign Letters of Exchange and at different missions, he was minister in Copenhagen 1821–1836, chamberlain in 1826, minister in The Hague 1836–1841, Vienna 1845–1850, envoy in Berlin 1850–1854 and in London 1854–1857.

Diplomatic posts
Preceded by Johan Henrik Tawast	Envoy of Sweden to Denmark; 1821–1836	Succeeded by Elias Lagerheim
Preceded by Abraham Constantin Mouradgea d'Ohsson	Envoy of Sweden to the Netherlands; 1836–1841	Succeeded by Edvard Gabriel Gyldenstolpe
Preceded by Carl Gustaf Löwenhielm	Envoy of Sweden to the Austrian Empire; 1845–1850	Succeeded by Carl von und zu Mansbach
Preceded by Abraham Constantin Mouradgea d'Ohsson	Envoy of Sweden to the Kingdom of Prussia; 1850–1854	Succeeded by Carl von und zu Mansbach
Preceded by Christian Adolf Virgin	Envoy of Sweden to the United Kingdom; 1854–1857	Succeeded by Baltzar von Platen
