= Albert Ehrensvärd =

Swedish diplomat (1867–1940)

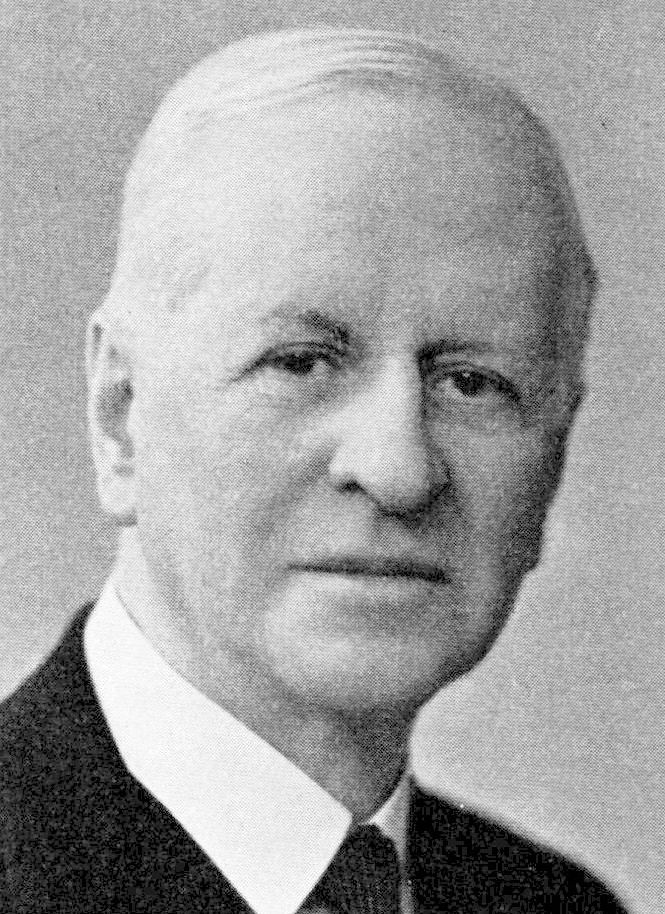

Envoy of Sweden to France
- In office 11 June 1918 – 4 May 1934
- Preceded by: August Gyldenstolpe
- Succeeded by: Einar Hennings

Envoy of Sweden to Switzerland
- In office 12 August 1915 – 1918
- Preceded by: None
- Succeeded by: Patrick Adlercreutz

Minister for Foreign Affairs
- In office 7 October 1911 – 17 February 1914
- Preceded by: Arvid Taube
- Succeeded by: Knut Agathon Wallenberg

Envoy of Sweden to the United States
- In office 8 October 1910 – 1911
- Preceded by: Herman Lagercrantz
- Succeeded by: August Ekengren

Envoy of Sweden to Belgium and to the Netherlands
- In office 17 June 1908 – 1910
- Preceded by: Gustaf Falkenberg
- Succeeded by: Fredrik af Klercker

State Secretary for Foreign Affairs
- In office 16 February 1906 – 1908
- Preceded by: Carl Strömfelt
- Succeeded by: Fredrik Ramel

Personal details
- Born: Johan Jacob Albert Ehrensvärd; 9 May 1867 Gothenburg, Sweden
- Died: 6 March 1940 (aged 72) Lund, Sweden
- Spouse: Marna Edith Christina Münter (m. 1917; died 1935)
- Relatives: C. A. Ehrensvärd (brother)
- Education: Lund University
- Occupation: Jurist, diplomat

Johan Jakob Albert Ehrensvärd (9 May 1867 – 6 March 1940) was a Swedish diplomat. He was Sweden's envoy to Washington D.C between 1910 and 1911. He became Sweden's Foreign Minister in Liberal leader and Prime Minister Karl Staaff's Second Cabinet. As Foreign Minister of Sweden he instituted reforms in the Swedish Foreign Service and worked to ease tensed relations with Czarist Russia.

== Early life and education ==
Ehrensvärd was born on 9 May 1867 in Gothenburg, Sweden. His father was the politician and civil servant Count Albert Ehrensvärd (1821–1901), who served as minister for foreign affairs from 1885 to 1889. His mother, Ingeborg Hedvig Vogt (1825–1904), was the daughter of Norwegian government minister Jørgen Herman Vogt and Countess Hedvig Lovisa Frölich, and she served as a lady-in-waiting to Queen Josephine. He had four siblings: Admiral Carl August Ehrensvärd (1867–1940), Henriette Eleonore Ingeborg Ehrensvärd (born 1853), Anna Louise Dorotée (born 1855), and Augustine Sofia Amalia (1862–1944). His paternal grandfather was Colonel Gustaf Ehrensvärd of the Scanian Dragoon Regiment, and his great-grandfather was Count Carl August Ehrensvärd, a naval officer, art theorist, artist, and architect.

Ehrensvärd completed his school-leaving examination on 27 May 1884 and enrolled at Lund University the same year. He earned a Bachelor of Philosophy degree on 31 May 1887, a Candidate of Law degree on 31 January 1891, and a Licentiate of Law degree in Lund on 24 May 1895. On 31 May 1895, he was awarded a Doctor of Law degree.

== Career ==
Ehrensvärd was appointed extraordinary notary at the Svea Court of Appeal in February 1891 and became vice district judge (vice häradshövding) on 31 May 1894. That same year, he joined the Ministry for Civil Service Affairs as an amanuensis. On 31 January 1896, he was appointed attaché. He then became acting extra legal clerk (fiskal) at the Svea Court of Appeal on 2 October 1898 and was promoted to assessor on 30 October 1903. On 15 September 1905, he was named director general for administrative affairs at the Ministry for Civil Service Affairs. The following year, on 16 February 1906, he was appointed state secretary for foreign affairs at the Ministry for Foreign Affairs. His diplomatic career continued with his appointment as envoy extraordinary and minister plenipotentiary to the Belgian and Dutch courts on 17 June 1908, and later to Washington, D.C., on 8 October 1910.

On 7 October 1911, Ehrensvärd was named minister for foreign affairs. He resigned from the position on 17 February 1914 and was placed on standby as a minister on 21 February 1914. His diplomatic service resumed when he was appointed envoy extraordinary and minister plenipotentiary to the Swiss Confederation on 12 August 1915, and later to the French Republic on 11 June 1918. On 15 March 1919, he represented Sweden in the negotiations for the League of Nations. That same year, he served as a delegate for the Åland and Spitsbergen questions at the Paris Peace Conference. In 1920, he was a delegate for the Åland Islands dispute the Council of the League of Nations. Ehrensvärd was chairman of the French committee of the Cartesius Foundation in 1931. He left the minister position in Paris and retired in 1934.

== Personal life ==
On 11 April 1917, in Copenhagen, Denmark, Ehrensvärd married Marna Edit Christina Münter (1 November 1869 in Copenhagen – 17 September 1935 in Lund). She was the daughter of the Danish chamberlain and lieutenant commander Alexander Balthasar Herman Jacob Münter and Johanne Elisabeth Johnson.

== Death ==
Ehrensvärd died on 6 March 1940 in Lunds domkyrkoförsamling in Lund, Sweden. He was interred on 10 March 1940 at the Ehrensvärd family grave at Tosterup Cemetery in Smedstorp Parish, Tomelilla Municipality.

== Awards and decorations ==
=== Swedish ===
- (Sweden) Commander Grand Cross of the Order of the Polar Star (6 June 1912)
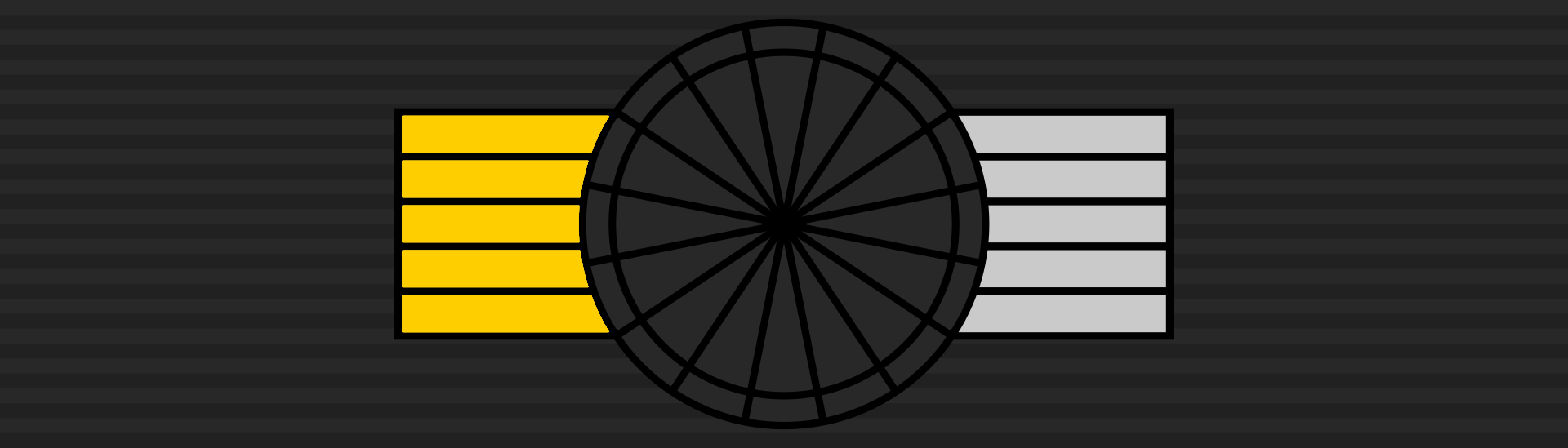
- (Sweden) Commander 1st Class of the Order of the Polar Star (6 June 1909)
- (Sweden) Commander of the Order of the Polar Star (16 June 1908)
- (Sweden) Knight of the Order of the Polar Star (1 December 1905)
- (Sweden) King Gustaf V's Olympic Commemorative Medal (1912)
- (Sweden) Letterstedtska priset (1923)

=== Foreign ===
- (Kingdom of Italy) Knight Grand Cross of the Order of Saints Maurice and Lazarus (1913)
- (Denmark) Grand Cross of the Order of the Dannebrog with diamond (18 November 1912)
- (Denmark) Grand Cross of the Order of the Dannebrog (2 January 1911)
- (Belgium) Grand Cordon of the Order of Leopold (1910)
- (Kingdom of Serbia) Grand Cross of the Order of St. Sava (1908)
- (Spain) Knight Grand Cross of the Order of Isabella the Catholic (1907)
- (France) Commander of the Legion of Honour (1909)
- (Ottoman Empire) 1st Class of the Order of the Medjidie (June 1906)
- (Russian Empire) Knight 1st Class of the Order of Saint Stanislaus (1908)
- (Russian Empire) Knight of the Order of Saint Alexander Nevsky (1912)
- (Qing dynasty) 2nd Class of the Order of the Double Dragon (1908)
- (France) French Academy Medal

== Honorary degrees ==
- Honorary Doctor of Philosophy, Uppsala University (16 September 1927)
- Honorary Doctor of Philosophy, University of Strasbourg (1934)
- Honorary Doctor of Philosophy, University of Poitiers (1934)

Diplomatic posts
Preceded by Gustaf Falkenberg	Envoy of Sweden to the Netherlands; 1908–1910	Succeeded by Fredrik af Klercker
Preceded by Gustaf Falkenberg	Envoy of Sweden to Belgium; 1908–1910	Succeeded by Fredrik af Klercker
Preceded by Herman Lagercrantz	Envoy of Sweden to the United States; 1910–1911	Succeeded by August Ekengren
Preceded by Herman Lagercrantz	Consul General of Sweden in Washington; 1910–1911	Succeeded by August Ekengren
Preceded by None (since 1815)	Envoy of Sweden to Switzerland; 1915–1918	Succeeded by Patrick Adlercreutz
Preceded by August Gyldenstolpe	Envoy of Sweden to France; 1918–1934	Succeeded by Einar Hennings
