= Abraham Constantin Mouradgea d'Ohsson =

Swedish historian and diplomat

- Born: 26 November 1779; Constantinople
- Died: 25 December 1851 (aged 72)
- Occupations: Historian, diplomat
- Father: Ignatius Mouradgea d'Ohsson
- Website: Berlin

Abraham Constantine Mouradgea d'Ohsson (26 November 1779, in Constantinople – 25 December 1851, in Berlin), was a Swedish historian and diplomat of Armenian descent. He was the son of Ignatius Mouradgea d'Ohsson. His best known work deals with the history of the Mongols from Genghis Khan to Timur.

== Career ==
Constantine d'Ohsson came to Sweden in 1798, and graduated from the Uppsala University in 1799. That same year he became clerk at the Foreign office and spent 1801–03 as an attaché in Paris, where he occupied himself with researches in Oriental history. He was a legation secretary in Madrid in 1805–06, at the embassy of the Prussian royal court in 1807–08, in Seville (where the Spanish insurrectionary government had its headquarters) in part of 1809, and in Paris, where he served as charge d'affaires from 1811 to 1813. Later he served a term as Cabinet Secretary to Crown Prince Karl Johan, was appointed in 1816 to the Swedish Minister at The Hague, was moved in the same capacity to Berlin in 1834 and recalled from there in 1850.

== Honors ==
Mouradgea converted from Catholic to Lutheran in 1815. In 1828 he was elevated to baronial position. He became a member of the Royal Swedish Academy of Sciences in 1817, an honorary member of the Royal Academy of Letters in 1823 and in 1828 of the Royal Society of Sciences in Uppsala.

== Academics ==
He studied chemistry and mineralogy under by Berzelius, and authored several essays for the Academy of Sciences as well as documents on universal gravitation (La pression de l'air et les theorem d'hydrodynamique, 1852). However, he devoted most of his time to historical research. He published in 1820 the third part of his father's work, "Tableau Général de l'Empire othoman" and wrote "Des Peuple you Caucase ou Voyage d'Abou-l-Cassim" (1828) and "Histoire des Mongols depuis Tchinguis-Khan jusqu'à Timour" (1834–35; new edition 1852), a widely referenced work. Before he died, d'Ohsson donated about 300 books and more than a dozen manuscripts to the Lund University.

The baronial family d'Ohsson became extinct after his death.

Diplomatic posts
Preceded by Gustaf Algernon Stierneld	Envoy of Sweden to the Netherlands; 1816–1834	Succeeded by Carl Hochschild
