= Erik Palmstierna =

Swedish politician and diplomat

The High Well-born Baron Erik Palmstierna GCVO
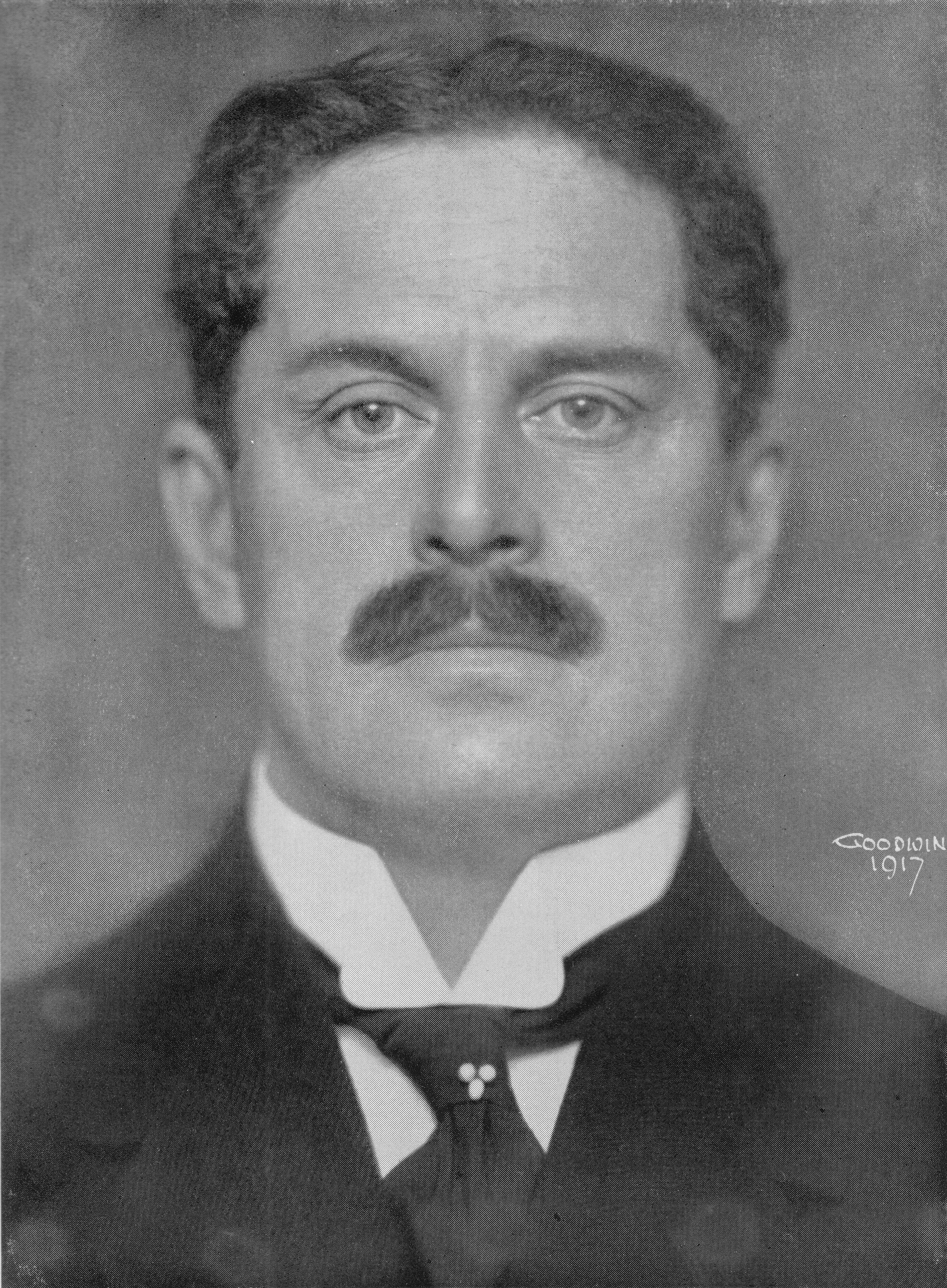
- Palmstierna photographed by Henry Buergel Goodwin in 1917
- Born: Erik Kule Palmstierna; 10 November 1877; Stockholm, Sweden
- Died: 22 November 1959 (aged 82); Florence, Italy
- Education: Royal Swedish Naval Academy
- Occupations: Politician, Diplomat
- Years active: 1897–1938
- Political party: Social Democratic
- Spouse: Ebba Carlheim-Gyllensköld (m. 1899–1959)
- Children: 3

Baron Erik Kule Palmstierna GCVO (10 November 1877 – 22 November 1959) was a Swedish Social Democratic politician, writer, and diplomat. He served as Naval Minister (the Swedish Minister of the Navy and Coastal Artillery) between 1917 and 1920 and briefly as Minister for Foreign Affairs in 1920, when he was heavily engaged in the Åland islands dispute. Later he was as Swedish envoy in London for most of the Interwar period, until his retirement partly due to a spiritualist controversy. He was married to the suffragette Ebba Palmstierna.

Lord Curzon nicknamed him "that Red Baron" for his leftist views.

== Biography ==
Erik Palmstierna was the son of courtier Carl Fredrik Palmstierna and noblewoman Hanna von Holst. He studied at the Naval Academy according to his father's wishes and became an officer (rising to captain by 1906), despite frequent seasickness. Influenced by an uncle, both Palmstierna and his parents joined Lord Radstock's evangelical movement, which also connected him to the causes of liberalism and social reform. His wife Ebba was the daughter of a senior officer who belonged to the same congregation.

He became a prominent voice in the question of housing policy, for which he was elected to the Karlskrona City Council in 1905 and a year later appointed secretary for the National Association for Social Work (Centralförbundet för socialt arbete) in Stockholm, which caused his retirement from the Navy. As secretary he honed his skills as an educator, orator, and pamphleteer, while studying economics with his friend Gustav Cassel. During the Association's conferences he debated issues of unemployment and land reform and was recognised for his radicalism. Inspired by the British Association of Municipal Corporations and the German Städtetag he founded Svenska stadsförbundet in 1908, and later became its secretary and editor of its magazine.

In 1908 Palmstierna was elected to both the Stockholm City Council and the lower house of Parliament as a Liberal, but defected to the Social Democratic Party a few years later due to disagreements with Karl Staaff regarding the labour movement. He quickly rose through the ranks of the Social Democrats, contributing in Fabian spirit to progressive publications and serving as party expert in defence policy. In the internal leftist struggles he had a strong mutual animosity against the Marxist faction of Zeth Höglund; on the other hand he aroused the fury of conservatives by his pamphleteering during the Courtyard Crisis. At this time he also advocated for intergovernmental peace organisations.

Palmstierna was one of four Social Democrats in the coalition government of 1917-1920 as the Minister of Naval Affairs. Though at first disappointed by the somewhat minor position relative to his ambitions, he relished in the involvement in the Åland dispute as a major supporter of unification between the islands and Sweden. Palmstierna carried out the operational leadership during the Swedish Invasion of Åland in 1918 largely independently of the government. His appointment to foreign minister in the Branting cabinet was partly due to the importance of the Åland question and partly for his foreign and inter-parliamentary contacts, as he was an early proponent of the League of Nations. As the League raised the Åland question, he intensified his diplomatic campaign against the Finnish claims. Though an anti-communist, Palmstierna held a pragmatic attitude towards the Soviets and supported private trade negotiations with Leonid Krasin. He also promoted Germany's membership in the League. When the League finally ruled in favour of Finland in the Åland question in 1921 he was livid, but still remained a supporter of the organisation.

With the fall of the Branting government Palmstierna chose to become Swedish envoy to the United Kingdom, switching roles with Herman Wrangel who replaced him as foreign minister in the cabinet of De Geer Jr. In this position he made many contacts in British politics and cultural life; among his friends were the Viscount Burnham, Harold Laski, and Hugh Walpole, and he convinced Bernard Shaw to accept his Nobel Prize in Literature. Additionally, he promoted the works of Carl Milles and August Strindberg.

Always interested in the supernatural, in Britain he became involved in spiritualism and participated in seances with the sisters Adila Fachiri and Jelly d'Arányi to uncover Schumann's final concerto, about which he wrote the book Horizons of immortality. This caused widespread criticism and mockery, which contributed both to his retirement from diplomatic service and his separation from his wife. Palmstierna lived much of the rest of his life in Ewelme near Oxford. He joined the World Congress of Faiths in the 1930s and was its president between 1941 and 1951. In 1958 he moved together with Fachiri to Italy, where he died the following year.

Government offices
Preceded by Hans Ericson	Minister for Naval Affairs; 1917–1920	Succeeded by Bernhard Eriksson
Preceded by Johannes Hellner	Minister for Foreign Affairs; 1920–1921	Succeeded by Herman Wrangel
Diplomatic posts
Preceded by Herman Wrangel	Envoy of Sweden to the United Kingdom; 1920–1937	Succeeded by Hans Gustaf Beck-Friis
