= Fredrik Wachtmeister =

Swedish politician and diplomat

- Axel Fredrik Claësson Wachtmeister af Johannishus
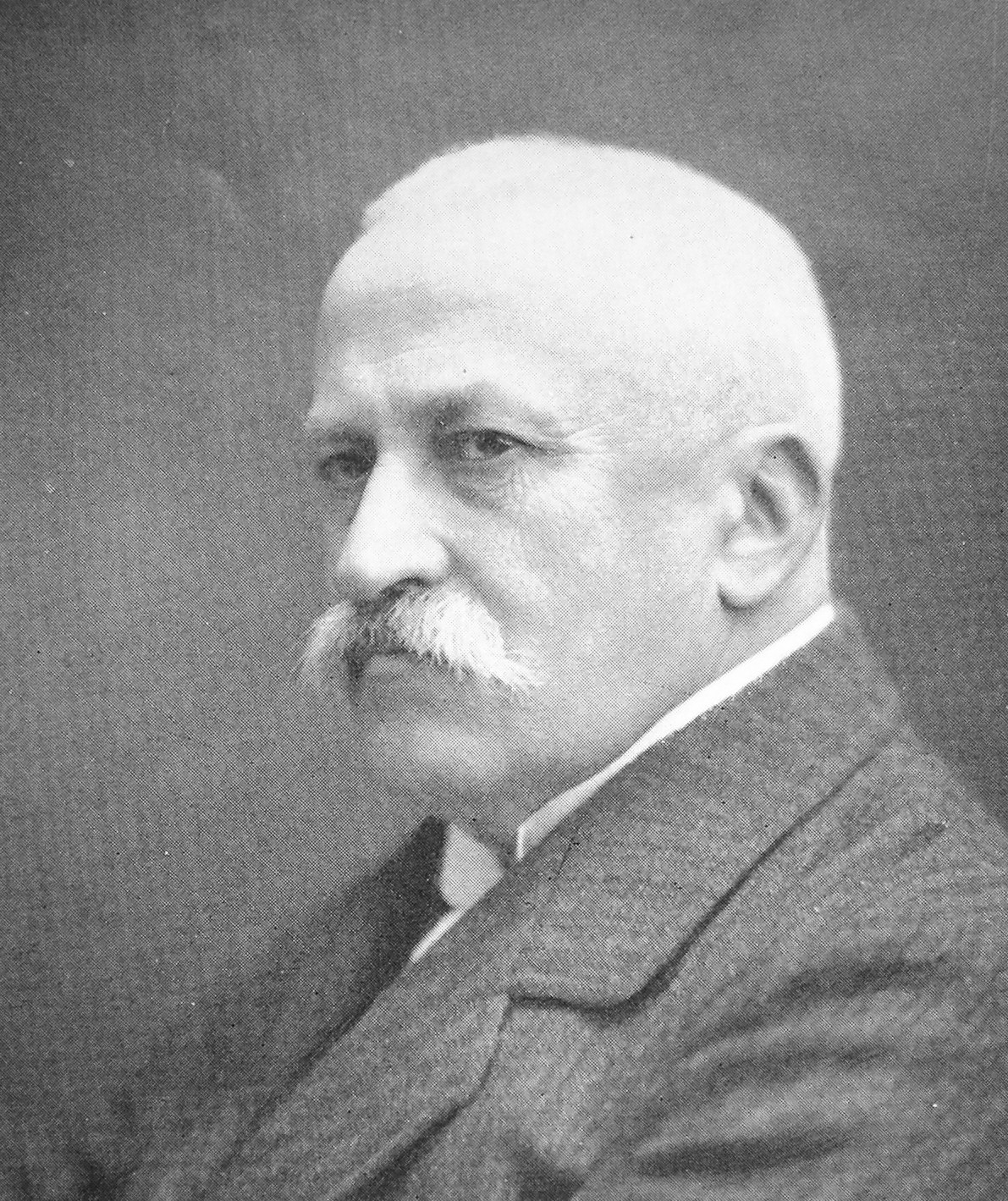

Minister of Foreign Affairs
- In office 2 August 1905 – 7 November 1905
- Monarch: Oscar II of Sweden
- Prime Minister: Christian Lundeberg
- Preceded by: August Gyldenstolpe
- Succeeded by: Eric Trolle

Personal details
- Born: February 10, 1855 Bärbo parish, Nyköping Municipality, Södermanland County, Sweden
- Died: September 6, 1919 (aged 64) Stockholm, Sweden
- Party: Protectionist Party
- Occupation: politician, diplomat

Axel Fredrik Claësson Wachtmeister af Johannishus (10 February 1855 – 6 September 1919) was a Swedish politician and diplomat who from 2 August 1905 until 7 November 1905 served as Minister of Foreign Affairs of Sweden.

== Early life ==
Fredrik Wachtmeister was born on 2 August 1905 in the family of Lieutenant Claes Wachtmeister. He grew up in Thystad Castle in Nyköping Municipality, Södermanland County.

== Career ==
For several years he held diplomatic posts at the Swedish embassies in Paris, Rome and Vienna, but left diplomacy at the age of 27.

From 1895 to 1916, he was a member of the Riksdag as a member of Protectionist Party, and from 1913 to 1914 he was chairman of the Committee of Supply.

From 2 August 1905 until 7 November 1905 served as Minister of Foreign Affairs of Sweden.

In 1906, he was the head of the Nationalmuseum.

From 1907 to 1916, he served as Chancellor of Uppsala University.

In 1906, he refused the offer of the king to take up the post of prime minister.

From 1907 to 1918, he was chairman of the board of the Nobel Foundation and inspector at the Nobel Institute, and since 1907 - chairman of the National Forestry Institute.

Member of Royal Swedish Academy of Sciences (since 1912), Royal Physiographic Society in Lund (since 1908), Royal Swedish Academy of Fine Arts (since 1902), Royal Swedish Academy of Letters, History and Antiquities (since 1912), Royal Swedish Academy of Agriculture and Forestry (since 1905), Royal Society of Sciences in Uppsala (since 1910).

Fredrik Wachtmeister died on 6 September 1919.

== Sources ==
- Fredrik Cl: son Wachtmeister. Min fars liv och verk. I—II, Maud von Steyern, Natur och Kultur, 1962.
- Sveriges statskalender för år 1913, utgifven efter Kungl. Maj: ts nådigste förordnande av dess Vetenskapsakademi, Uppsala & Stockholm 1913 ISSN 0347-7223, avsnitt 129, 715, 797, 834, 838, 842, 853, 854, 860, 901.
- Tvåkammarriksdagen 1867—1970 (Almqvist & Wiksell International 1988), band 1, s. 400

Government offices
Preceded by August Gyldenstolpe	Minister for Foreign Affairs; 1905	Succeeded by Eric Trolle
