= Carl von und zu Mansbach =

Hessian-Norwegian military officer and diplomat

Carl von und zu Mansbach (26 March 1790 – 17 July 1867) was a Hessian-Norwegian military officer and diplomat. He led the Norwegian Military Academy from 1822 to 1828, and later commanded Bergenhus Fortress and Fredriksten Fortress, reaching the rank of lieutenant general. His later career was spent as a Swedish-Norwegian diplomat.

== Early life ==
Mansbach was born at Fredrikshald to military officer Johann Friedrich von und zu Mansbach (1744–1803) and Isabella von Oldenburg (1769–1855). He spent his childhood in Denmark, and in December 1803 he became a corporal in the Infantry Regiment of Schleswig. He was promoted to second lieutenant in 1805. From January 1808 he served in the Royal Life Guards, and in March 1811 he became premier lieutenant.

In May 1812, in Fredrikshald, he married his first cousin, Anna Sophia Maria Anker (1793–1860). Their daughter Eleonora Mansbach (1825–1869) married judge and politician Otto Joachim Løvenskiold in August 1845, and thus became the stepmother of Herman Severin Løvenskiold and Carl Otto Løvenskiold.

== Career in Norway ==
From 1814, when Norway won independence, Mansbach served Norway—his country of birth. He became a member of the General Staff, and was promoted to captain on 22 May 1814. After a hiatus between October 1814 and January 1815, he became major in September 1815 and lieutenant colonel in September 1821. He served as leader of the Norwegian Military Academy from August 1822 to June 1828. He advanced to colonel in July 1823, major general in June 1828 and lieutenant general in January 1839. He was the commander of Bergenhus Fortress from 1828 to 1838, and then commander at Fredriksten Fortress.

On 30 December 1847, Mansbach became a diplomat, as he was assigned as Swedish-Norwegian ambassador to The Hague. From 1851 to 1855 he was stationed in Vienna, and from 1855 to 1858 in Berlin and Dresden. In 1858 he retired to his family manor in Mansbach, Hesse, where he died in July 1867.

Military offices
Preceded by	Commander of Bergenhus Fortress; 1828–1838	Succeeded by Hans Glad Bloch
Preceded by Palle Røhmer Fleischer	Commander of Fredriksten Fortress; 1838–1847	Succeeded by Hans Glad Bloch
Diplomatic posts
Preceded by Axel von Wahrendorff	Envoy of Sweden to the Netherlands; 1847–1851	Succeeded by Wilhelm af Wetterstedt
Preceded by Carl Hochschild	Envoy of Sweden to the Austrian Empire; 1851–1855	Succeeded by Ludvig Manderström
