= August Ekengren =

Swedish diplomat (1861–1920)

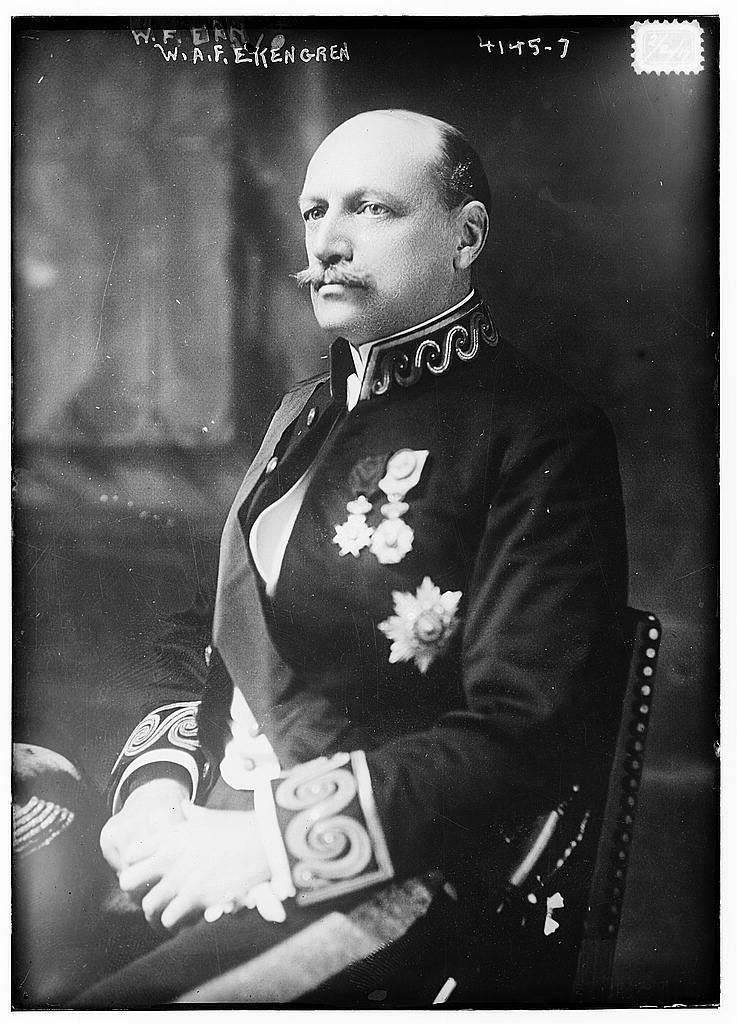
Ekengren in 1917.

Wilhelm August Ferdinand Ekengren (10 November 1861 – 26 November 1920) was a Swedish diplomat. He was envoy of Sweden to the United States from 1912 to 1920.

== Early life ==
Ekengren was born on 10 November 1861 in Stockholm, Sweden, the son of Vilhelm Ferdinand Ekengren (1835–1923) and his wife Augusta Bachertz. Ekengren graduated from Uppsala University in 1895 and began his diplomatic career in 1896.

== Career ==
Ekengren served as vice consul in Rouen in 1896, which was followed by appointments as vice consul in Bordeaux and vice consul Le Havre and consul in Lübeck.

Ekengren was vice consul in New York City from 1899 to 1900 and from 1902 to 1903. He was second secretary at the Ministry for Foreign Affairs in 1905 and legation secretary in Washington, D.C. in 1906 (thereunder serving longer periods as chargé d'affaires). He became legation counsellor there in 1910 and was envoy from March 1912. During World War I when diplomatic relations with the Austro-Hungarian Empire were severed, he was in charge of relations between Austria-Hungary and the United States.

== Personal life ==
In 1909 he married Laura Wolcott Jackson. He died on 26 November 1920 in Washington, D.C. after a brief illness. Funeral services was held at St. John's Episcopal Church in Washington, D.C. Ekengren's remains were then brought to Sweden on the American battleship USS New Hampshire which arrived in Stockholm on 15 February 1921. He was buried at Norra begravningsplatsen in Solna Municipality.

== Dates of appointment ==
Ekengren's dates of appointment:

- Acting Vice Consul in Rouen; 22 August – 23 November 1896
- Acting Vice Consul in Bordeaux; 17 August 1897 – 1 June 1898
- Acting Vice Consul and Consulate Secretary in Le Havre; 2 July – 21 December 1898
- Acting Vice Consul in New York City; 21 March 1899 – 9 October 1900
- Acting Consul General in Lübeck; 1 June – 1 August. 1902
- Acting Vice Consul in New York City; 10 September 1902 – 3 March 1903
- Serving at the Foreign Office in Stockholm; 2 October 1903
- Acting Second Secretary; 6 December 1904
- Second Secretary; 30 June 1905
- Acting head of the Consulate Department; 4–31 December 1905, 5–31 August 1906
- Legation Secretary in Washington, D.C.; 28 September 1906
- Acting Charge d'affaires; 1 December 1906 – 23 April 1907, 29 October 1907 – 15 September 1908, 16 June – 29 November 1909, 7 June 1910 – 23 January 1911
- Legation Counsellor; 16 December 1910
- Envoy in Washington, D.C.; 22 March 1912.

== Awards and decorations ==
- Commander First Class of the Order of the Polar Star
- Second Class of the Order of the Double Dragon
- Officer of the Order of Leopold

Diplomatic posts
| Preceded by Albert Ehrensvärd | Envoy of Sweden to the United States; 1912–1920 | Succeeded by Axel Wallenberg |
| Preceded by Albert Ehrensvärd | Consul General of Sweden in Washington; 1912–1913 | Succeeded by None |
