= Ignatius Mouradgea d'Ohsson =

- Born: Ignatius Muradcan Tosunyan; 31 July 1740; Pera, Istanbul, the Ottoman Empire
- Died: 27 August 1807 (aged 67); Bièvres, France
- Issue: Abraham Constantin Mouradgea d'Ohsson

Ignatius Mouradgea d'Ohsson (31 July 1740 – 27 August 1807) was an Armenian orientalist, historian and diplomat in Swedish service. In 1768 he was supreme interpreter, in its subsequent elevation to the Swedish nobility, he participated in the French-sounding names d'Ohsson. Abraham Constantin Mouradgea d'Ohsson, author of a famous History of the Mongols, was his son. He lived many years in France.

== Biography ==
He was born at Pera, the European part of Istanbul, in 1740 as Ignatius Muradjan Tosunian the son of a Catholic family. He followed his father, who was an interpreter at the Swedish Embassy, by entering into the service of the Swedish embassy at the Ottoman Porte, and his talents earned him the highest diplomatic honours. He was made charge of affairs, knight of the order of Vasa and in 1782 minister plenipotentiary and envoy extraordinary. His knowledge of the Arabic language and Turkish languages gave him the means of acquiring information about the Ottoman Empire from the best sources. He decided to write a history of Ottoman Sultan Selim II, but changed his goal with a plan to give a full picture of the Ottoman Empire. He devoted himself to this work he devoted himself with the greatest zeal and perseverance, and succeeded in collecting the first authentic information about national customs and habitats, mosques, and private life.

He went to Paris With the materials which he had obtained and published his work in two volumes (1788-1789) under the title of Tableau Général de l'Empire Othoman. This work answered the expectations that had been created around it. The beautiful typography and engravings created an expense, which exceeded the proceeds, but d'Ohsson possessed a large fortune and was willing to make material sacrifices to obtain a perfect result. The French Revolution interrupted his literary activity, and he returned to Constantinople. Sultan Selim III, who honoured knowledge, allowed the two published volumes to be presented to him, and, far from being displeased at the disclosure of some secrets, gave instructions to facilitate the writer's researches by affording him necessary information.

After a long sojourn in Constantinople, d'Ohsson returned to Paris, where he found scarcely any traces of his large property. Even the buildings where he had deposited the copies of his work and the plates, drawings, etcetera, had been destroyed and plundered. Without allowing himself to be depressed by these misfortunes, he devised a still greater plan, which had in view a historical picture of the whole East, and became entirely absorbed in its execution. He had completely two volumes of his Tableau Historique de l'Orient by 1804, when the war with Sweden made him apprehensive of another interruption. He asked and received permission from his government to retire to the country. Here he continued his undertaking during three years, and gave the fruit of fifty-four years' labour in a work which contains a complete view of the Ottoman Empire in three separate divisions with the titles Tableau Historique de l'Orient, a history of all nations under the Ottoman government; Tableau Général de l'Empire Othoman, a view of the laws, religion and customs, etcetera; lastly, L'Histoire de la Maison Ottomane, from Osman I till 1758. The work was nearly completed when d'Ohsson's death on 27 August 1807 interrupted it.

== Works ==
- Tableau Historique de l'Orient. 2 volumes.
- Tableau Général de l'Empire Othoman. 7 volumes. Firmin Didot, Paris 1788-1824.
  - German: Allgemeine Schilderung des Othomanischen Reichs. Abridged and translated by Christian Daniel Beck. 2 vols. Weidmann, Leipzig 1788/1793 (Band 1 at Google Books; Band 2 at Google Books).
- L'Histoire de la Maison Ottomane. From Osman I till 1758.

== Literature ==
- Carter Vaughn Findley. Enlightening Europe on Islam and the Ottomans: Mouradgea d'Ohsson and His Masterpiece, Brill, Leiden, 2019, xv + 398 pages
- Elisabeth A. Fraser: "Dressing Turks in the French Manner". Mouradgea d'Ohsson's Panorama of the Ottoman Empire. In: Ars Orientalis. Bd. 39 (2009), S. 198–230.
- Elisabeth A. Fraser, Mediterranean Encounters: Artists Between Europe and the Ottoman Empire, 1774-1839, Penn State University Press, 2017. ISBN 978-0-271-07320-0
