= Alfred Lagerheim =

Swedish politician and diplomat (1843–1924)

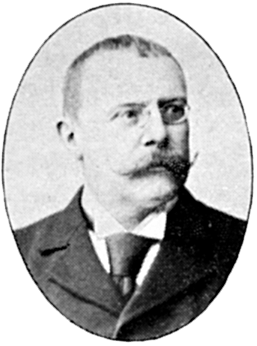
- Lagerheim in 1899

Minister for Foreign Affairs
- In office 1899–1904
- Monarch: Oscar II
- Prime Minister: Erik Gustaf Boström; Fredrik von Otter
- Preceded by: Ludvig Douglas
- Succeeded by: August Gyldenstolpe

Personal details
- Born: Carl Herman Theodor Alfred Lagerheim; 4 October 1843 Copenhagen, Denmark
- Died: 24 May 1924 (aged 80) Stockholm, Sweden
- Resting place: Norra begravningsplatsen
- Education: Uppsala University
- Occupation: Diplomat

Carl Herman Theodor Alfred Lagerheim (4 October 1843 – 23 May 1924) was a Swedish politician and diplomat. Lagerheim was born in Copenhagen, Denmark and was a student in Uppsala in 1859 and graduated in 1861. He became an attaché in Paris in 1862, second secretary at the Foreign Ministry in 1865, legation secretary in Saint Petersburg in 1870 and head of the Foreign Ministry's political department in 1871. He was the Minister for Foreign Affairs between 1899 and 1904.

Diplomatic posts
Preceded by Gillis Bildt	Envoy of Sweden to the German Empire; 1886–1899	Succeeded by Arvid Taube
Government offices
Preceded by Ludvig Douglas	Minister for Foreign Affairs; 1899–1904	Succeeded by August Gyldenstolpe
