= Salsta Castle =

Country house in Sweden

- Salsta, Uppsala Municipality, Uppsala County, Sweden
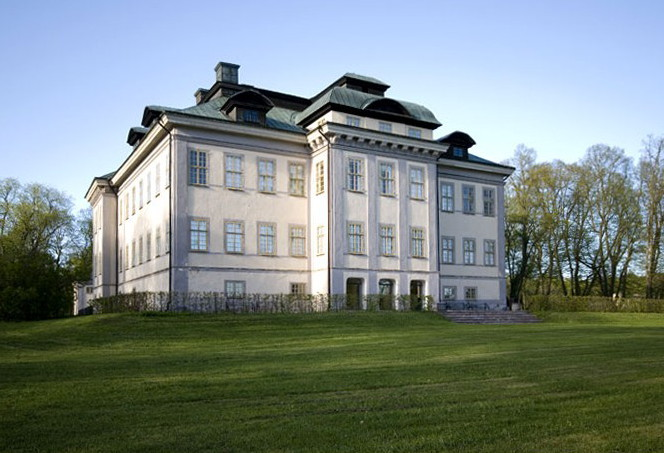

Site information
- Type: Country house
- Owner: Swedish state
- Open to the public: Guided summer tours by appointment

Location
- Coordinates: 60°02′43″N 17°44′23″E

Site history
- Built by: Mathias Spieler

Salsta Castle (Swedish: Salsta slott), today a country house in Sweden, situated north of Vattholma, Uppsala Municipality, approximately 25 kilometers north of Uppsala, was originally a fortified castle on the site in the late 13th century. The estate has belonged to some of the most influential noble families in Sweden, including Oxenstierna, Bielke and Brahe. The present palace was erected in the French Baroque style in the 1670s for Nils Bielke the Younger, 1st Count Bielke af Åkerö and Imperial Count of Torgelow, incorporating elements from an earlier Renaissance castle, and designed and constructed by Mathias Spieler after an earlier design by Nicodemus Tessin the Elder.

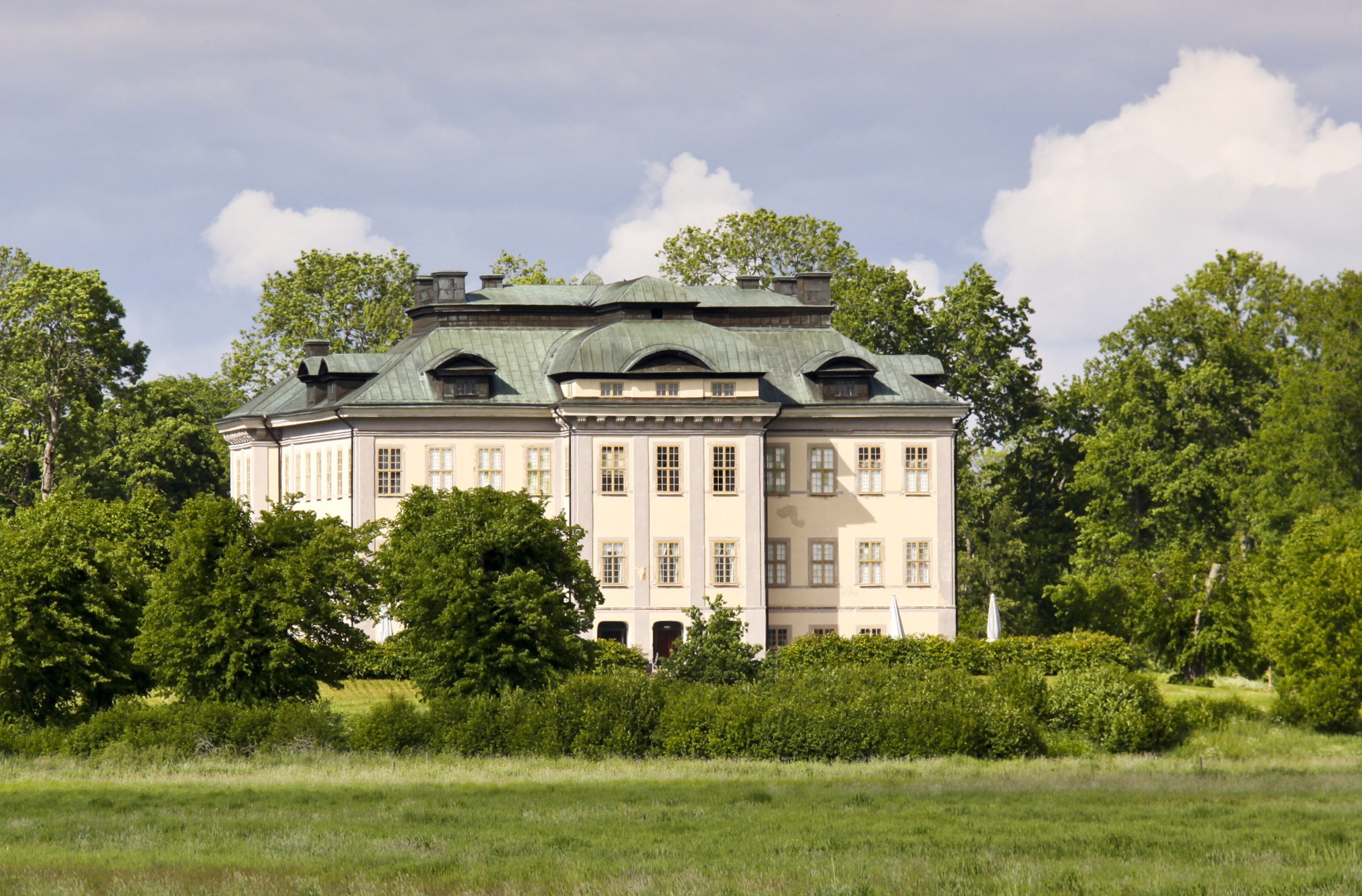
View from the park

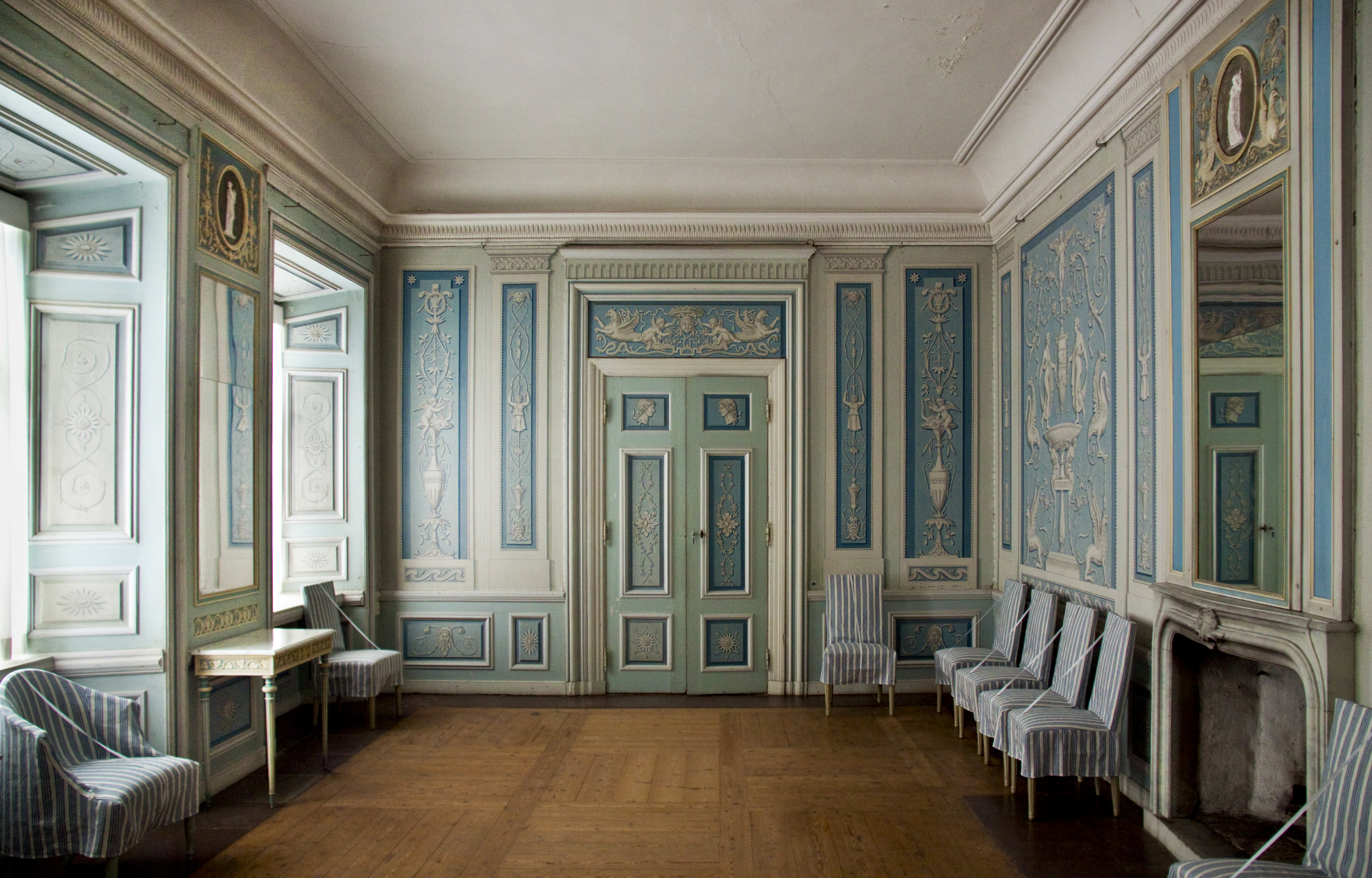
The blue empire room

== Architecture ==
Salsta is built of stone and brick on two floors in an open square, except for the basement floor. The building has a lower ground floor with two projecting corner pavilions and two independent wings facing the garden side . The building has around 35 rooms. The high plinth contains beautifully arched rooms for the kitchen and other economy spaces . There is also a hall in direct contact with the garden.

The ground floor was decorated in 1682, but was furnished four years later. There is a series of fabric-stretched ceilings with paintings in shades of gray, imitating stucco . In the count's bedchamber, the alcove is decorated with gilded columns.

== See also ==
- List of castles in Sweden
