= Embassy of Sweden, Brussels =

Diplomatic mission of Sweden in Brussels, Belgium

- Location: Brussels, Belgium
- Address: Square de Meeûs 30, 1000 Brussels; Belgium
- Coordinates: 50.84068°N 4.36973°E
- Opening: 1837 (Note: The embassy was closed between 1 July 2011 and 1 September 2025.)
- Ambassador: Johanna Brismar Skoog
- Jurisdiction: Belgium; Luxembourg
- Website: www.swedenabroad.se/en/embassies/belgium-brussels

The Embassy of Sweden in Brussels is the diplomatic mission of Sweden to Belgium and Luxembourg. The Swedish diplomatic mission in Brussels was established in 1837. For much of the late 19th century it was shared with The Hague, and during World War II it briefly relocated to London. In 1956, Sweden and Belgium upgraded their missions to embassies, with Gunnar Reuterskiöld as Sweden’s first ambassador in Brussels.

In the 2010s, the embassy earned environmental recognition as the only embassy in Brussels awarded the "Entreprise écodynamique" label. However, due to budget cuts, the Swedish government closed the embassy in July 2011, leaving a Stockholm-based ambassador responsible for relations. A consulate general was later opened in Brussels in 2020, mainly handling consular services and crisis assistance.

In February 2025, Sweden announced plans to reconvert the consulate general into an embassy, which was officially reopened on 1 September 2025. The embassy's responsibilities include maintaining bilateral relations with Belgium and Luxembourg, political monitoring, trade and investment promotion, cultural exchange, and providing consular services such as emergency assistance and issuing temporary passports.

== History ==
The diplomatic mission in Brussels was established in 1837. From 1869 to 1895, the mission was shared with The Hague, Netherlands, located in the latter city and covering both states. Until 1921, the envoy in Brussels had a dual accreditation in The Hague.

During World War II, the envoy post was vacant between 1942 and 1944. From 1 April 1944, Gunnar Hägglöf served as envoy extraordinary and minister plenipotentiary to the Belgian government in exile and the Dutch government-in-exile in London. In November of the same year, the Swedish mission in Brussels resumed its operations after Hägglöf returned there from London. The Swedish properties in Belgium were relatively unscathed during the war. The mission and consulate general in Brussels, the consulate general in Antwerp, as well as the Seamen's Church and other Swedish institutions, were undamaged.

In March 1956, an agreement was reached between the Swedish government and the Belgian government to mutually elevate each other's legations to embassies. In connection with this, the Swedish government appointed the then envoy Gunnar Reuterskiöld as ambassador.

During the 2010s, the Swedish embassy in Brussels received the "Entreprise écodynamique" accolade, which was an official recognition and reward for environmental awareness for both public and private companies in the Brussels region. As the only embassy in Brussels, the Swedish embassy was awarded a first star and could then be called - Entreprise écodynamique.

On 22 December 2010, the Reinfeldt cabinet decided to close the embassy in Brussels, along with four other Swedish embassies. According to Foreign Minister Carl Bildt, the decision was a consequence of the Riksdag deciding to cut the grant to the Government Office by SEK 300 million. The embassy closed on 1 July 2011. From 2011, a Stockholm-based ambassador was responsible for the bilateral relations between Sweden and Belgium. On 2 November 2020, Sweden opened a consulate general in Brussels, whose general focus is consular activities, including ensuring readiness to assist individuals in crisis or disaster situations. In February 2025, the Swedish government announced its intention to convert the consulate general into an embassy during the summer. On 1 September 2025, the consulate general in Brussels was converted into an embassy.

== Staff and tasks ==
=== Staff ===
In 2010, the embassy had the following positions: ambassador, ambassador's secretary, counselor and deputy head of mission, trade secretary, a position for economic affairs, EU project exports and trade promotion, a press counselor, a cultural and information officer, a consular officer, a receptionist, a third embassy secretary, an administrative officer, as well as locally employed staff in the form of an administrative assistant, chauffeur, and chauffeur/caretaker.

=== Tasks ===
The embassy in Brussels was bilateral and had the task of promoting Sweden's relations with Belgium. The embassy included a consular section that provided services to Swedish citizens as well as to third-country citizens with connections to Sweden. The Swedish Trade Council's office in Brussels was attached to the embassy as a trade section. The ambassador's task was to conduct ongoing dialogue with the Belgian government, particularly on EU matters, and to promote the economic and cultural relations between Belgium and Sweden.

After the closure of the embassy in the summer of 2011, a consulate was established with the following tasks: issuing temporary passports, delivering regular passports, national identity cards, and driver's licenses issued by authorities in Sweden or a Swedish embassy, name registration and co-ordination numbers (samordningsnummer), life certificates for Swedish citizens, death certificates for Swedish citizens who have died in Belgium, certain other certificates, citizenship application, and delivery of residence permit cards.

After the embassy was re-established in 2025, the primarily focus was the following areas:

- Bilateral relations with Belgium and Luxembourg
- Political monitoring
- Trade and investment promotion
- Providing advice and support to Swedish citizens in emergency situations
- Issue temporary passports if a passport has expired or been lost

== Buildings ==
=== Chancery ===
In July 1911, the chancery moved to Rue Van Eyck 25 in the municipality of Ixelles south-east of Brussels' city centre. Here it remained until 1915. With the German occupation of Brussels in 1916, the mission moved to Hotel des Indes in The Hague, Netherlands, which was neutral during the war. Here it stayed until 1918 before returning to Rue Van Eyck 25 in Brussels in 1919. In 1920, the office moved to Avenue Louise 162 in the southern part of the City of Brussels. It remained there until 1928.

In 1928, the house at Avenue Géo Bernier 13 in Ixelles was acquired by the Swedish state (see section on the residence below). The house served as the chancery and residence until 1960. From 1961 to 1962, the chancery was located at Rue de l'Aurore 2, a few hundred meters away from the residence at Avenue Géo Bernier 13. In 1963, the chancery moved to Avenue Louise 148, where it remained for over 35 years, until 1999. From 2000 until the closure in 2011, the address was Sweden House, Rue du Luxembourg 3, a few hundred meters from the Royal Palace of Brussels.

The embassy was re-established on 1 September 2025 and is now located in the same building that previously housed the Consulate General and currently hosts the Permanent Representation of Sweden to the European Union, at Square de Meeûs 30, in the City of Brussels municipality.

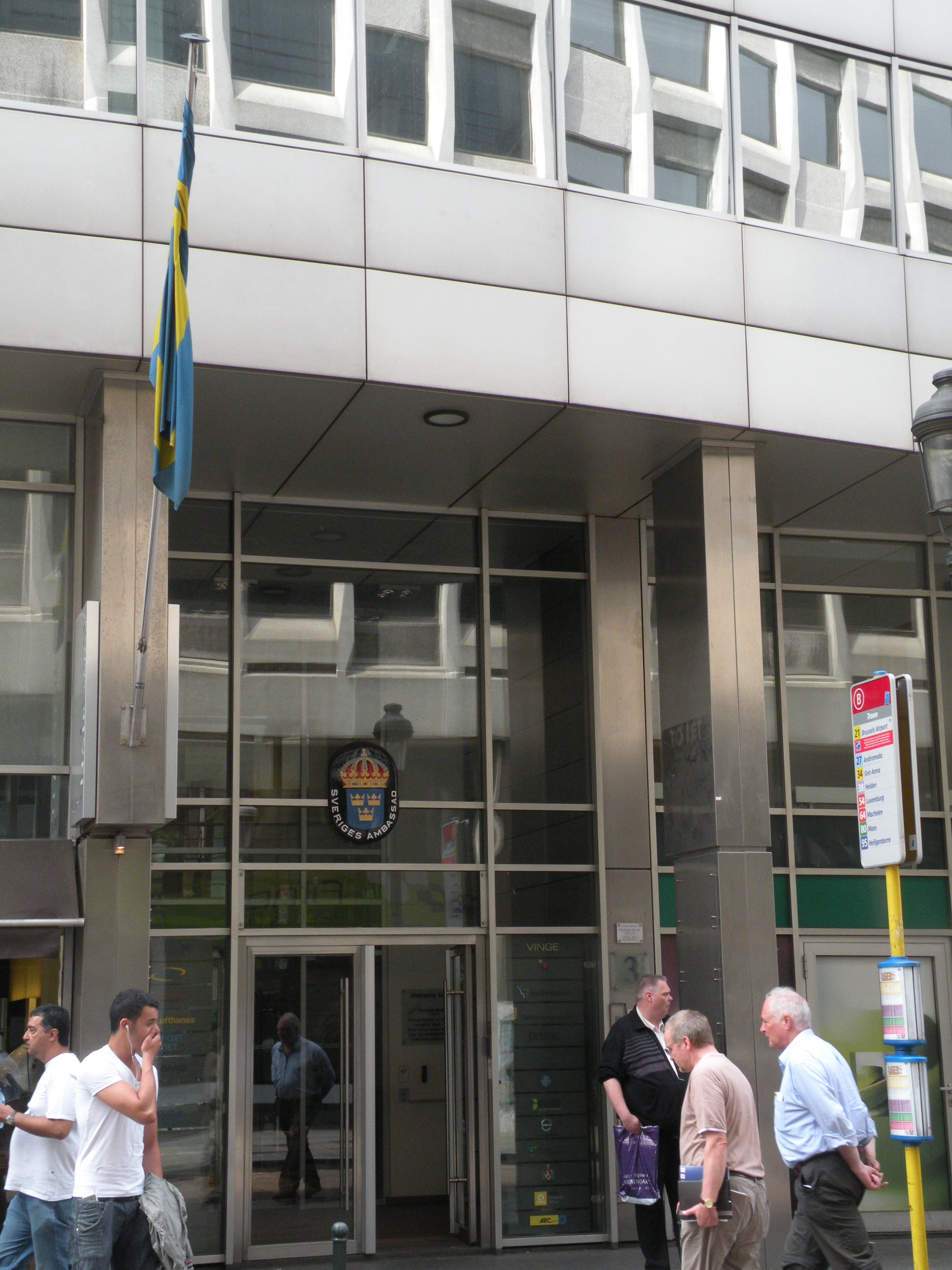
Sweden House, Rue du Luxembourg 3
(2000–2011)

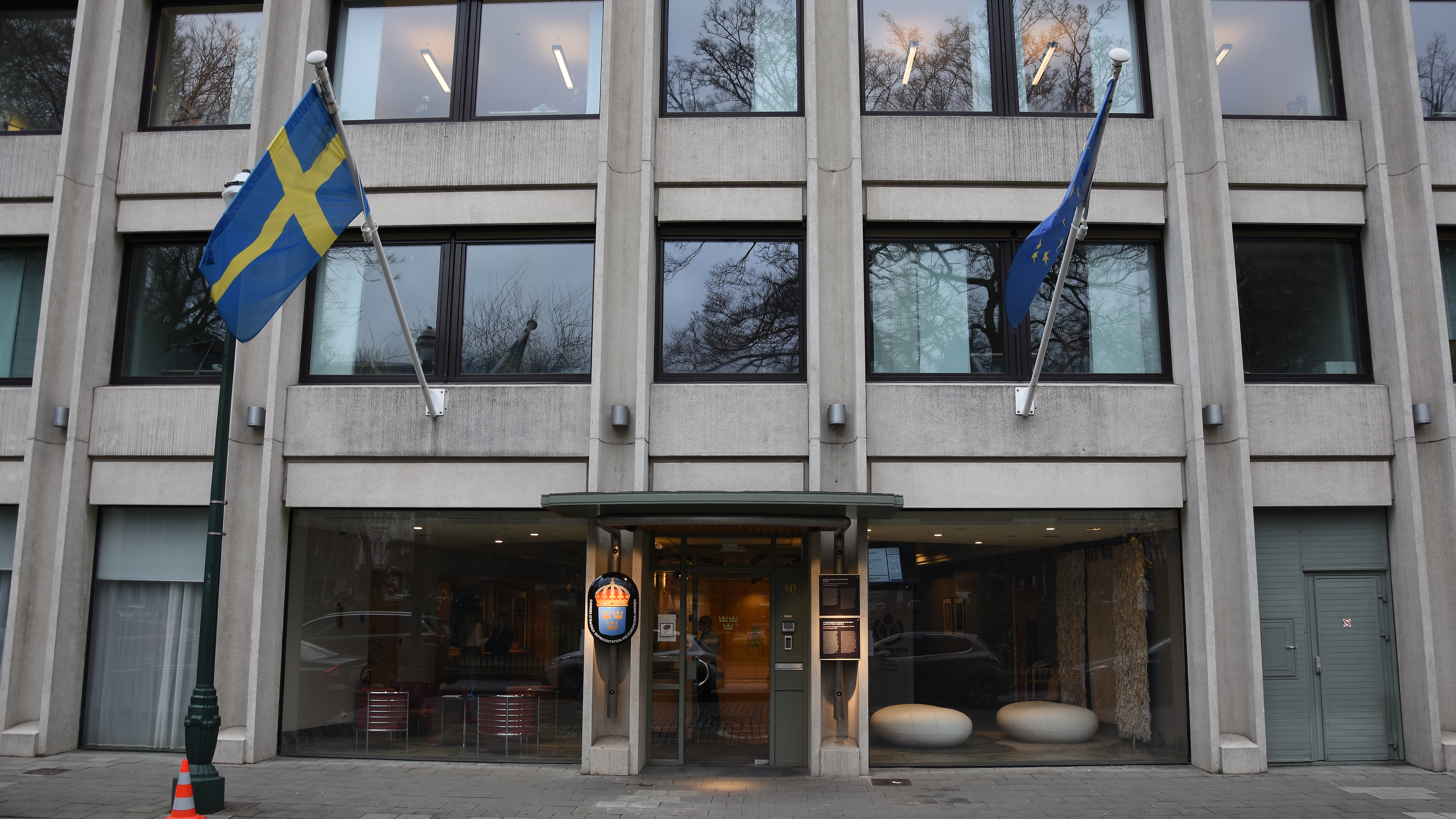
Square de Meeûs 30
(2025–present)

=== Residence ===
In 1928, on the initiative of then envoy Gustaf von Dardel, the Swedish state purchased the house at Avenue Géo Bernier 13 in Ixelles. The house was designed in 1913 by the architect Adrien Blomme as a residence and architectural office for himself and his family. Blomme's family couldn't move in until 1916 due to the First World War.

Blomme, inspired by Italian Renaissance and Andrea Palladio's architecture, designed the house with four floors and a basement. It includes ceramic relief panels on the back, which are replicas of Andrea della Robbia's decorations on Brunelleschi's Ospedale degli Innocenti in Florence. The ground floor façade is made of sandstone while the other floors have yellow plaster with window frames of natural stone. The courtyard façades are of whitewashed brick, and the roofs are covered with slate tiles. At the time of acquisition, renovations were carried out, including the conversion of the architectural firm's office into a banquet hall and the construction of a fireplace with the Swedish national coat of arms. Additionally, a connection was established between the main building and the upper part of the house over the courtyard. The purchase of the property was related to the marriage of the Swedish Princess Astrid to the Belgian Crown Prince Leopold. The residence was intended to better reflect "Sweden's elevated status through marriage", and the princess's parents, Prince Carl and Princess Ingeborg, would be able to be housed in a dignified manner. Since then, the property has served as the Swedish ambassador's residence in Brussels.

In 1997, the city of Brussels decided to protect certain parts of the property as cultural heritage. This included the roofs, façades, entrance, hall, staircase, and landing, along with three rooms on the first floor facing the street, as well as the lower gallery at the back. The house is managed by the National Property Board of Sweden, and the tenant is the Ministry for Foreign Affairs.

Avenue Géo Bernier 13

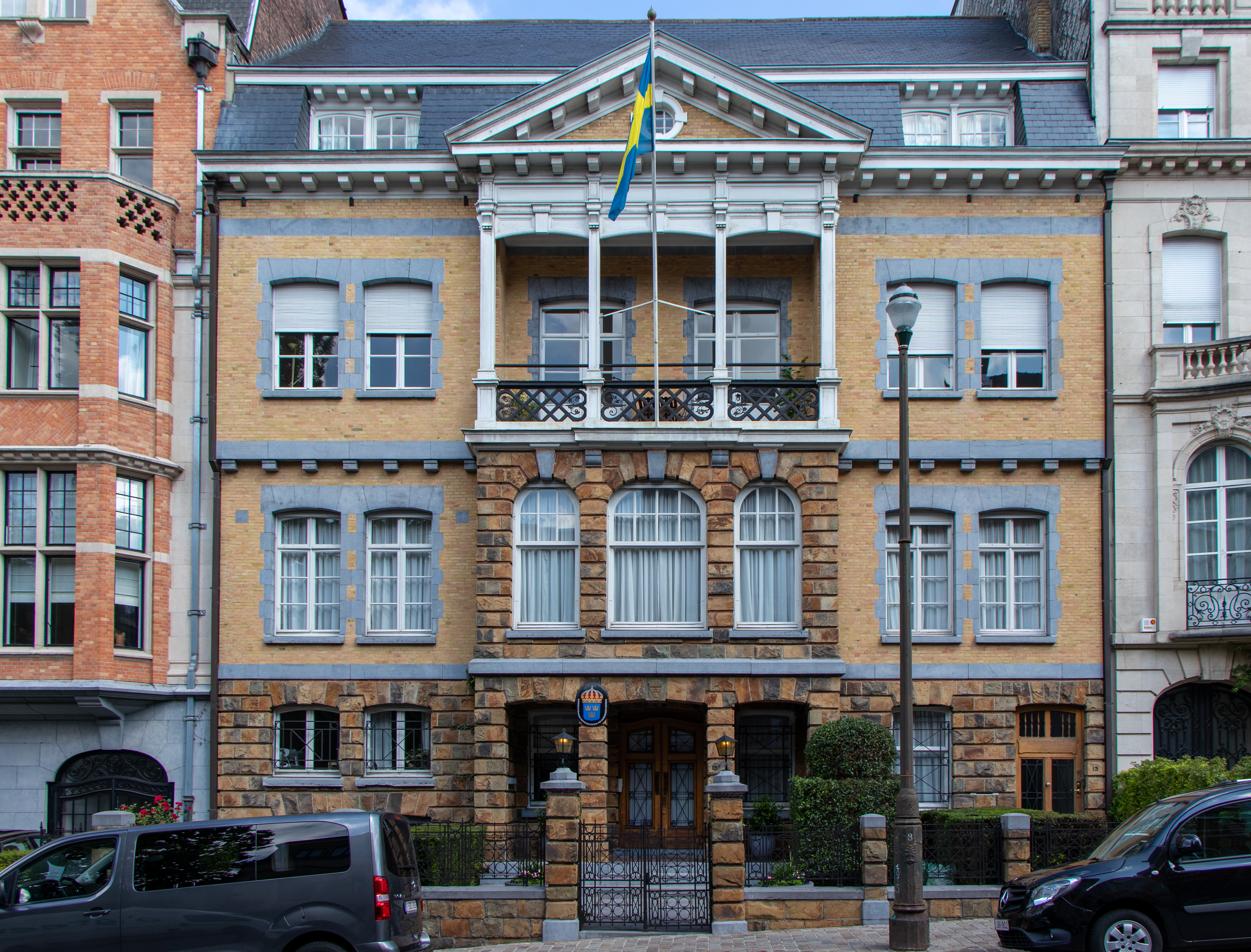
Façade

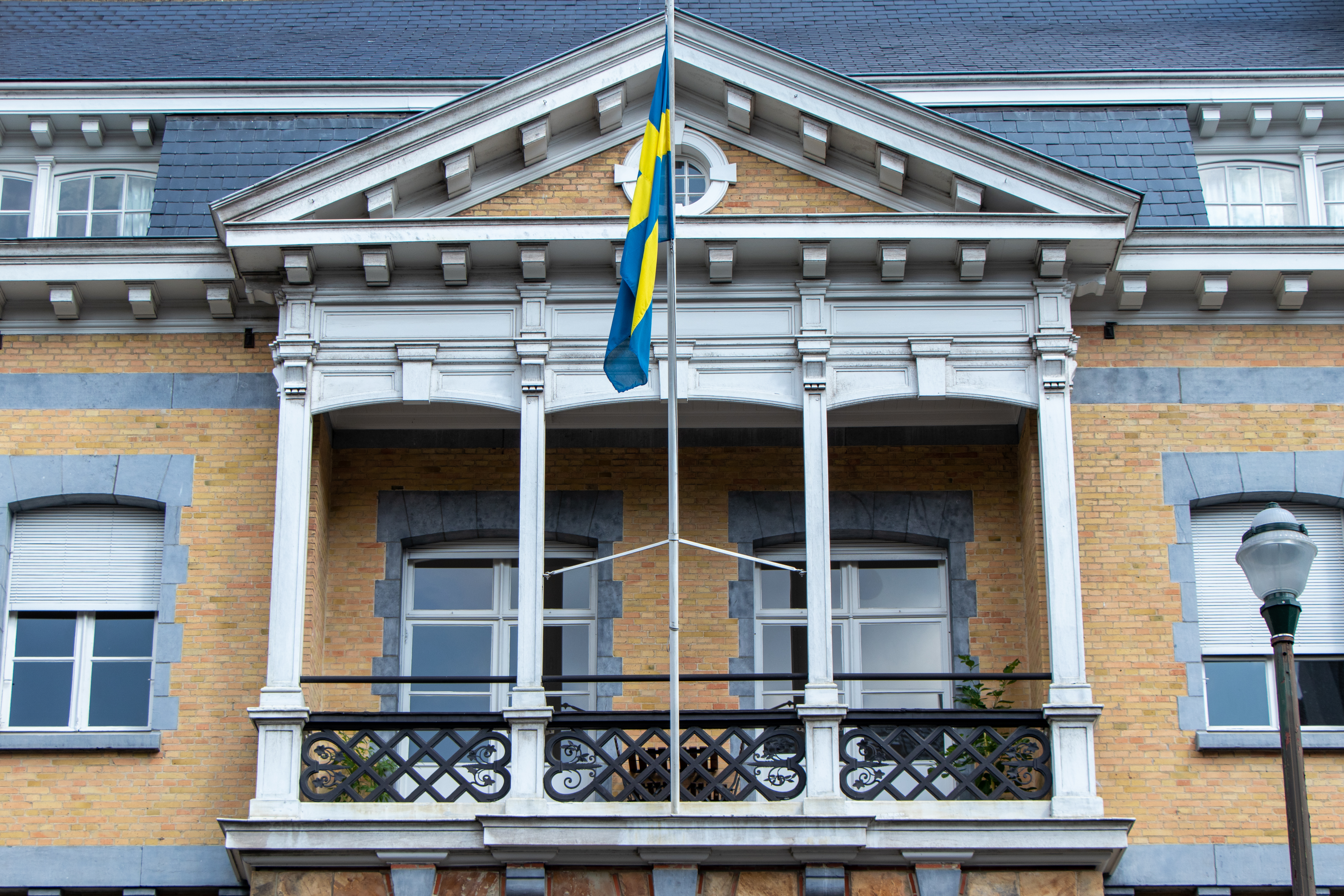
Loggia

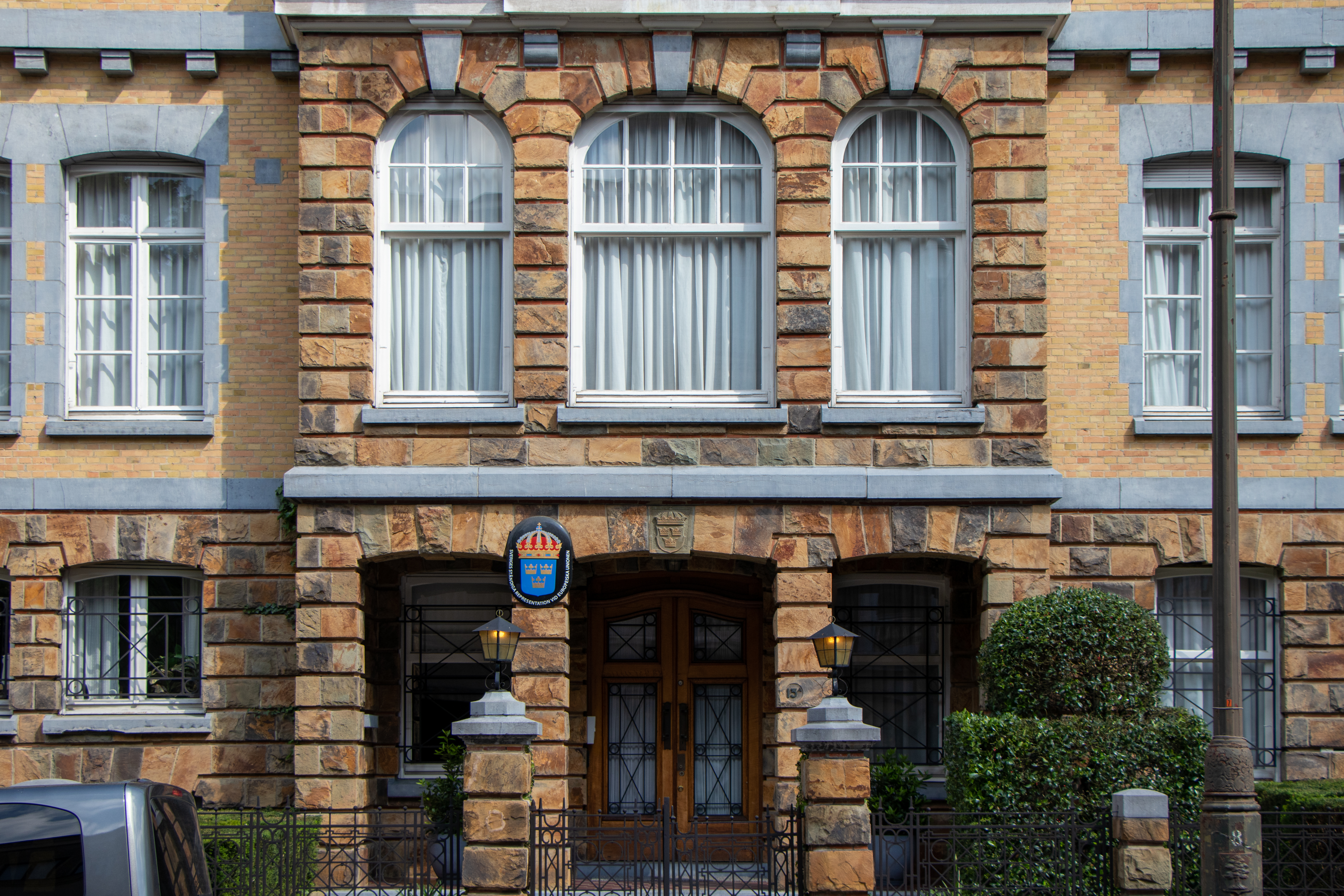
Entrance and lesser coat of arms of Sweden

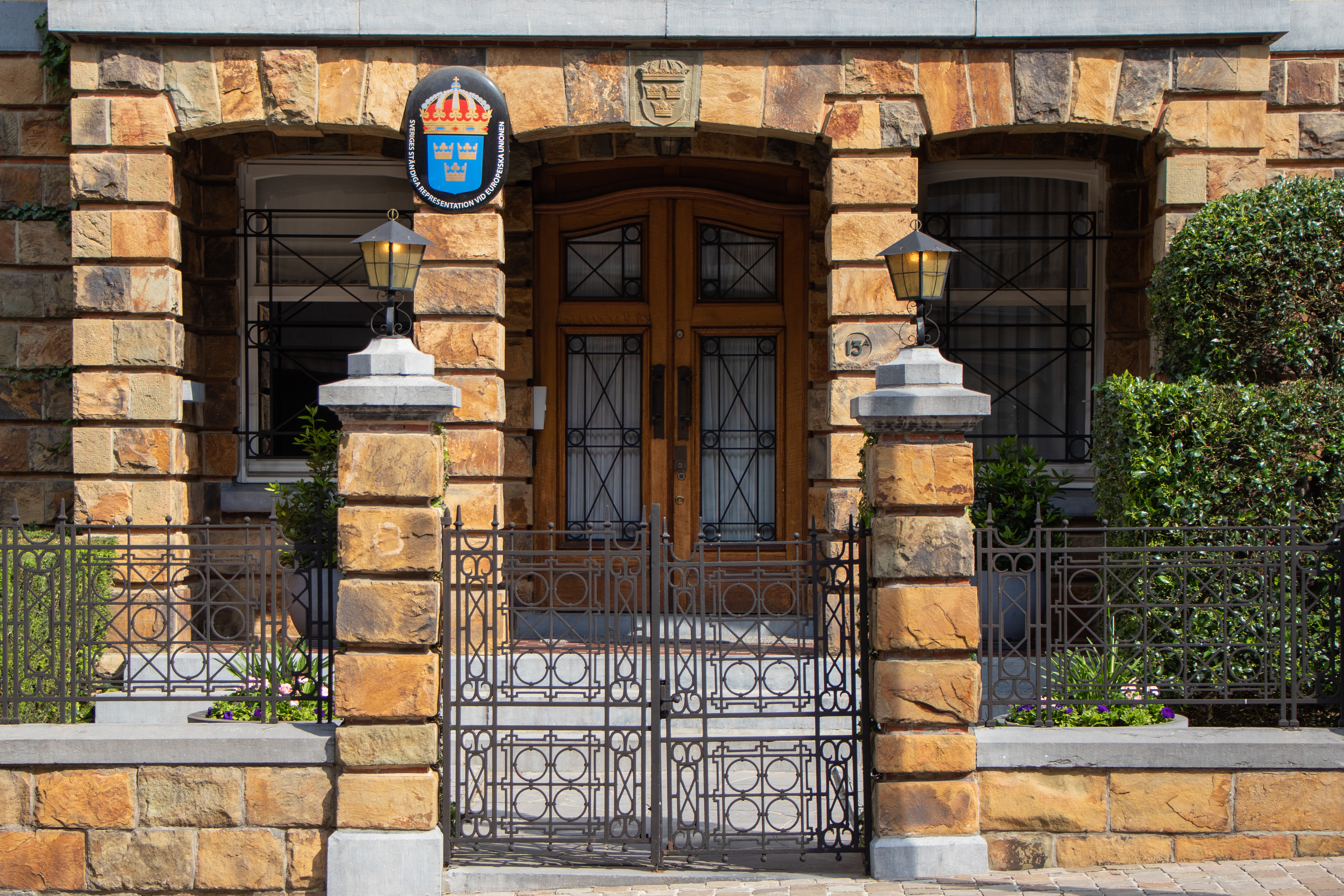
Entrance
