= Eric Trolle (diplomat) =

Swedish diplomat and governor (1863–1934)

His Excellency Eric Trolle
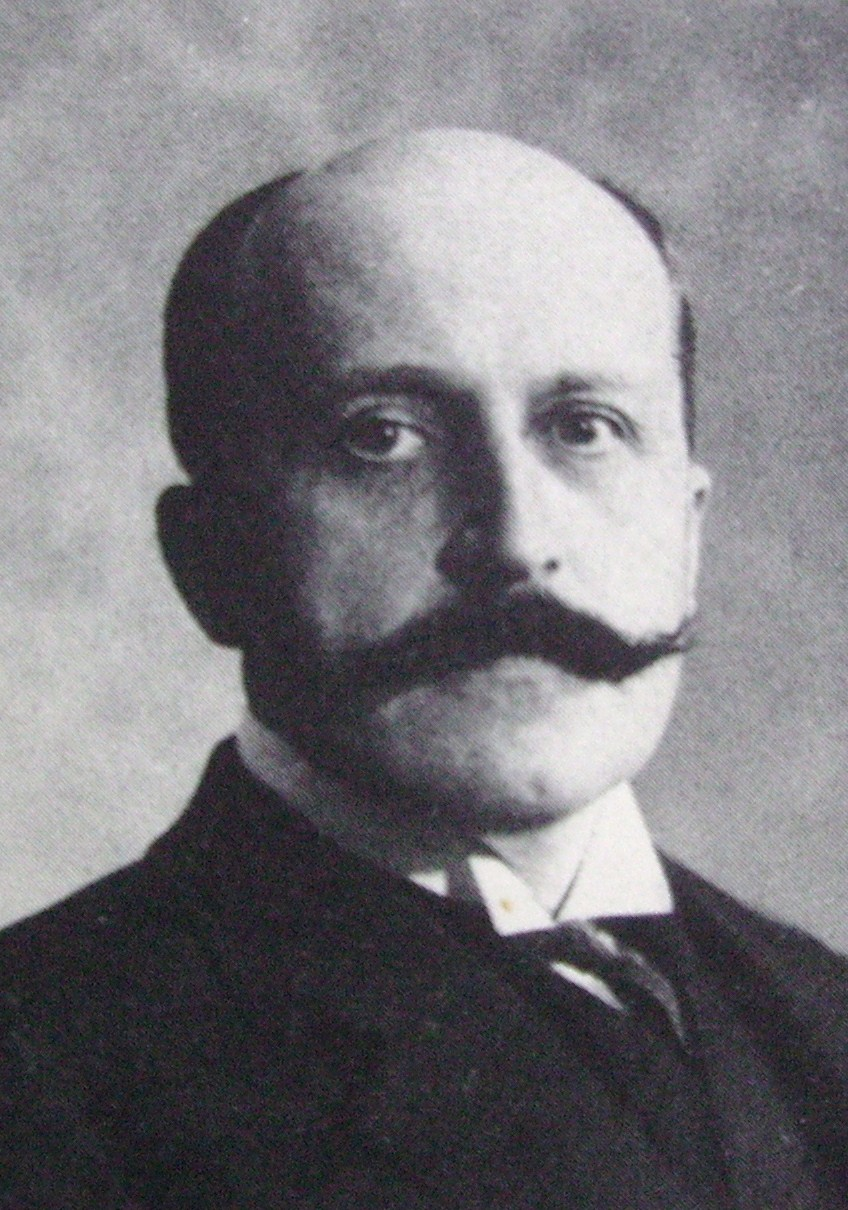

Marshal of the Realm
- In office 12 April 1930 – 21 April 1934
- Preceded by: Otto Printzsköld
- Succeeded by: Oscar von Sydow

Governor of Östergötland County
- In office 1 April 1912 – 26 September 1930
- Preceded by: Ludvig Douglas
- Succeeded by: Karl Tiselius

Envoy of Sweden to the German Empire
- In office 30 April 1909 – 1912
- Preceded by: Arvid Taube
- Succeeded by: Arvid Taube

Minister for Foreign Affairs
- In office 7 November 1905 – 17 March 1909
- Monarchs: Oscar II; Gustaf V
- Prime Minister: Karl Staaff; Arvid Lindman
- Preceded by: Fredrik Wachtmeister
- Succeeded by: Arvid Taube

Envoy of Sweden to Denmark
- In office 30 June 1905 – November 1905
- Preceded by: Ove Gude
- Succeeded by: Hjalmar Hammarskjöld

Personal details
- Born: Eric Birger Trolle; 23 September 1863 Hyby, Sweden
- Died: 21 April 1934 (aged 70) Stockholm, Sweden
- Spouse: Alice Gyldenstolpe (m. 1893)
- Children: 2
- Education: Lund University
- Occupation: Diplomat

Eric Birger Trolle (23 September 1863 – 21 April 1934) was a Swedish diplomat and statesman who served as minister for foreign affairs from 1905 to 1909 and later as Governor of Östergötland County from 1909 to 1930. He began his diplomatic career in 1886, serving in the Swedish legations in Copenhagen, Madrid, and Berlin, and subsequently held senior positions in the Ministry for Foreign Affairs. In 1903, he became state secretary for foreign affairs and played a role during the dissolution of the union between Norway and Sweden in 1905. He was appointed envoy extraordinary and minister plenipotentiary to Denmark in 1905 before becoming minister for foreign affairs later that year. As foreign minister, he represented Sweden in the negotiations that led to the Baltic Agreement of 1908. After leaving the government in 1909, he served as Sweden's envoy to several German courts while simultaneously holding the governorship of Östergötland County. In 1930, he was appointed Marshal of the Realm, one of the highest offices of the Swedish royal court, and retired as governor later that year.

== Early life ==
Eric Trolle was born on 23 September 1863 at Klågerup Castle in Hyby Parish, Svedala Municipality, Sweden, the son of the landed proprietor and member of parliament Carl Axel Trolle (1810–1879) and his wife Ebba Carolina Eva Maria Charlotta Toll (1824–1900).

He was the brother of the baron, courtier, and member of parliament Nils Trolle (1859–1930), and of the jurist, member of parliament, and landed proprietor Carl Axel Trolle (1862–1919).

His paternal grandfather was the chamberlain and baron Nils Trolle (1777–1827). His great-grandfather was the historian and chamberlain Arvid Trolle (1724–1797); his great-great-grandfather was the landed proprietor and politician Fredrik Trolle (1693–1770); his great-great-great-grandfather was the Danish-Swedish officer Arvid Trolle (1653–1698); and his great-great-great-great-grandfather was the Danish nobleman Niels Trolle (1599–1667).

He passed his matriculation examination (mogenhetsexamamen) on 6 June 1882 and enrolled at Lund University in 1883. He passed the preliminary examination in law (juridisk preliminärexamen) on 30 May 1884, followed by the Chancellery Examination (kansliexamen) on 14 September 1886.

== Career ==
Trolle was appointed attaché on 29 October 1886 and began serving in the Ministry for Foreign Affairs on 1 November of the same year. He was assigned to the Swedish legation in Copenhagen on 28 February 1887 and to Madrid on 24 June that year, where he served as head of the latter mission from 4 July to 3 October. He returned to the Ministry for Foreign Affairs on 23 June 1889 and was appointed acting second secretary there on 29 March of the same year, becoming second secretary on 10 September. On 20 April 1894 he was appointed acting first secretary, and on 16 June he became first secretary. He was appointed chamberlain on 1 December and Vice Master of Ceremonies on the same date. On 12 November he became legation secretary at the Swedish legation in Berlin.

On 29 June 1900, Trolle was appointed legation counsellor. On 8 May 1903, he became state secretary for foreign affairs. During his tenure, the union between Norway and Sweden was dissolved in 1905. On 30 June 1905 he was appointed envoy extraordinary and minister plenipotentiary at the Danish court, and on 7 November that year he became minister for foreign affairs. Trolle served as minister for foreign affairs in Karl Staaff's first government. He and Lars Tingsten subsequently remained in office when Arvid Lindman's government was formed in 1906. In 1909, however, Trolle resigned from the government together with Alfred Petersson and Gustaf Roos, following disagreements with the parliamentary opposition concerning Article 46 of the Riksdag Act. As minister for foreign affairs, Trolle represented Sweden, among other things, in the diplomatic negotiations that led to the conclusion of the so-called Baltic Agreement in 1908.

Trolle was relieved of his duties as minister for foreign affairs on 17 March 1909. On 30 April that year, he was appointed envoy extraordinary and minister plenipotentiary to the German, Bavarian, Saxon, and Baden courts. He had also been appointed Governor of Östergötland County and Governor of Linköping Castle on 1 April. From 1912 to 1930, Trolle served as chairman of the Östergötland County Agricultural Society (Östergötlands läns hushållningssällskap), and from 1912 as chairman of the board of the Göta Canal Company. In 1915 he was a delegate to the trade negotiations with England and chairman of the War Insurance and Trade Commissions. On 8 October 1918 he became Vice Chancellor of the Royal Orders of Chivalry (Kungl. Maj:ts Orden, KMO).

Trolle served as chairman of the board of the Northern Östergötland Railways from 1920 to 1933. On 26 September 1921 he represented Sweden in the negotiations concerning the neutralization of the Åland Islands. On 31 May 1924 he became Chancellor of the (Kungl. Maj:ts Orden, KMO). On 21 November of the same year, he was relieved of his duties as a member and chairman of the Ministry for Foreign Affairs' admissions commission. On 15 March 1930, Trolle was appointed Acting Marshal of the Realm, and on 12 April he was formally appointed to the position. That same year he became chairman of the supervisory board of King Oscar II's Jubilee Fund, retired from his post as Governor of Östergötland County on 26 September, and joined the board of Stockholms Enskilda Bank.

== Personal life ==
Trolle married Countess Alice Gyldenstolpe (1872–1953) on 15 November 1893 in the Royal Chapel in Stockholm. She was the daughter of Master of the Horse Count Gustaf Gyldenstolpe (1839–1919) and Lady of the State Alice Gyldenstolpe (1850–1927).

The couple had two children: Catharina Ebba Alice Fredrika (1894–1983) and Chamberlain Erik Trolle (1901–1981).

== Death ==
Trolle died of pneumonia at around 9 a.m. on 21 April 1934 at Mösseberg Sanatorium in Falköping Municipality. At the time of his death, he was registered in the Royal Court Parish in the City of Stockholm.

His funeral service was held on 26 April 1934 in the Royal Chapel in Stockholm. He was buried on 30 April 1934 at Fulltofta Cemetery in Hörby Municipality.

== Awards and decorations ==
=== Swedish ===
- (Sweden) Knight and Commander of the Orders of His Majesty the King's Orden (Order of the Seraphim) (16 June 1908)
- (Sweden) King Oscar II and Queen Sofia's Golden Wedding Medal (6 June 1907)
- (Sweden) King Oscar II's Jubilee Commemorative Medal (18 September 1897)
- (Sweden) King Gustaf V's Jubilee Commemorative Medal (16 June 1928)
- (Sweden) Knight of the Order of Charles XIII (28 January 1919)
- (Sweden) Commander Grand Cross of the Order of Vasa (23 September 1922)
- (Sweden) Commander Grand Cross of the Order of the Polar Star (1 December 1906)
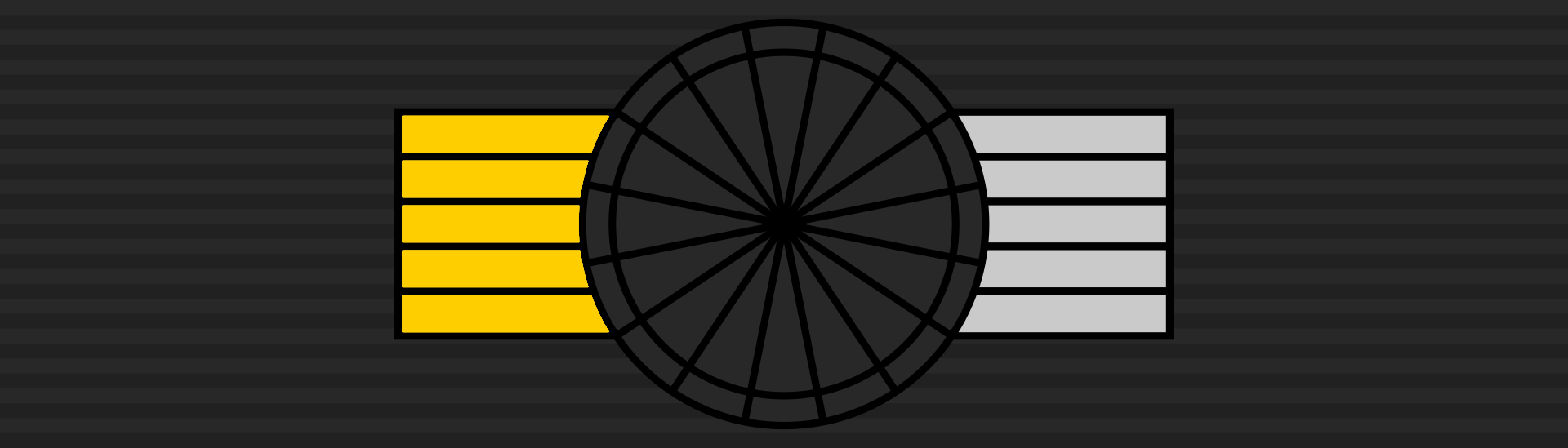
- (Sweden) Commander 1st Class of the Order of the Polar Star (1 December 1905)
- (Sweden) Knight of the Order of the Polar Star (18 September 1897)
- Knight of the Order of Saint John in Sweden (1930)
- (Sweden) King Gustaf V's Olympic Commemorative Medal (Konung Gustaf V:s olympiska minnesmedalj) (1912)

=== Foreign ===
- (Grand Duchy of Baden) Knight of the House Order of Fidelity (1912)
- (Denmark) Grand Commander of the Order of the Dannebrog (3 June 1908)
- (Denmark) Grand Cross of the Order of the Dannebrog (11 September 1906)
- (Denmark) Commander of the Order of the Dannebrog (3 February 1897)
- (France) Grand Cross of the Legion of Honour (July 1908)
- (Qing dynasty) 1st Class of the Order of the Double Dragon (1909)
- (Netherlands) Grand Cross of the Order of the House of Orange (1930)
- (Portugal) Grand Cross of the Order of the Immaculate Conception of Vila Viçosa (between 1901 and 1903)
- (Portugal) Knight of the Order of the Immaculate Conception of Vila Viçosa (1897)
- (Kingdom of Prussia) Knight 1st Class with crown of the Order of the Red Eagle (August 1908)
- (Russian Empire) Knight of the Order of Saint Alexander Nevsky (16/29 April 1908 O.S./N.S.)
- (Kingdom of Serbia) Grand Cross of the Order of the White Eagle (1909)
- (Spain) Grand Cross of the Order of Isabella the Catholic (1904)
- (United Kingdom) Knight Grand Cross of the Royal Victorian Order (April 1908)
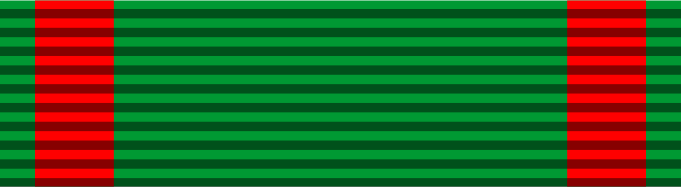
- (Ottoman Empire) 1st Class of the Order of Osmanieh (June 1906)
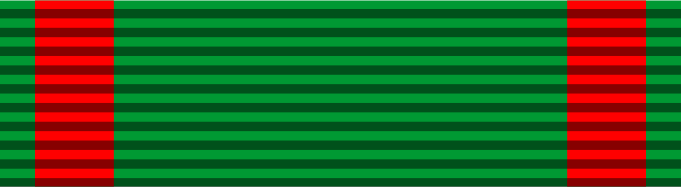
- (Ottoman Empire) 2nd Class of the Order of Osmanieh (1901)
- Grand Cross of the Order of Saint Stephen of Hungary (1908)
- (Grand Duchy of Mecklenburg-Schwerin) Commander 1st Class of the Order of the Griffon (between 1901 and 1903)
- (Kingdom of Prussia) Knight 2nd Class with star of the Order of the Crown (1905)
- (Kingdom of Romania) Commander of the Order of the Crown of Romania (between 1897 and 1900)
- (Kingdom of Saxony) Commander 2nd Class of the Albert Order (between 1901 and 1903)
- (Belgium) Officer of the Order of Leopold (1895)
- (Italy) Officer of the Order of Saints Maurice and Lazarus (between 1897 and 1900)
- (Norway) Knight of the Order of St. Olav (1903)
- (Spain) Knight of the Order of Charles III (23 June 1887)
- 4th Class of the Order of the Crown of Thailand (November 1891)

== Honours ==
- Member of the Royal Swedish Academy of Agriculture and Forestry (1915)

Government offices
Preceded by Thor von Ditten	State Secretary for Foreign Affairs; 1903–1905	Succeeded by Carl Haraldsson Strömfelt
Preceded by Fredrik Wachtmeister	Minister for Foreign Affairs; 1905–1909	Succeeded by Arvid Taube
Diplomatic posts
Preceded by Ove Gude	Envoy of Sweden to Denmark; 1905–1905	Succeeded by Hjalmar Hammarskjöld
Preceded by Arvid Taube	Envoy of Sweden to the German Empire; 1909–1912	Succeeded by Arvid Taube
Civic offices
Preceded by Ludvig Douglas	Governor of Östergötland County; 1912–1930	Succeeded by Karl Tiselius
Court offices
Preceded by Otto Printzsköld	Marshal of the Realm; 1930–1934	Succeeded by Oscar von Sydow
