= Magnhild =

Magnhild is a Norwegian female given name.

People with that name include:

- Magnhild of Fulltofta (died before 1228), Danish Roman Catholic local saint
- Magnhild Eia (born 1960), Norwegian politician
- Magnhild Haalke (1885–1984), Norwegian novelist
- Magnhild Hagelia (1904–1996), Norwegian politician
- Magnhild Holmberg (1943–2013), Norwegian politician
- Magnhild Meltveit Kleppa (born 1948), Norwegian politician
- Magnhild Lien, Norwegian mathematician
- Magnhild Folkvord (born 1945), Norwegian journalist and biographer
