= Folkvord =

Folkvord is a surname. Notable people with the surname include:

- Erling Folkvord (1949–2024), Norwegian politician
- Gard Folkvord (1969–), Norwegian politician
- Magnhild Folkvord (1945–), Norwegian journalist and biographer
- Svein Folkvord (1967–), Norwegian jazz musician
