= List of ambassadors of Sweden to Germany =

Ambassador of Sweden to Germany
- Lesser coat of arms of the Kingdom of Sweden

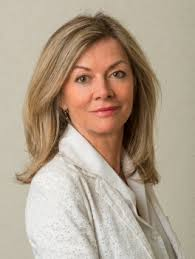
- Incumbent; Veronika Wand-Danielsson since August 2023
- Ministry for Foreign Affairs; Swedish Embassy, Berlin
- Style: His or Her Excellency (formal); Mr. or Madam Ambassador (informal)
- Reports to: Minister for Foreign Affairs
- Residence: Pücklerstraße 42–44, Dahlem
- Seat: Berlin, Germany
- Appointer: Government of Sweden
- Term length: No fixed term
- Inaugural holder: Carl Gustaf Friesendorff
- Formation: 1705
- Website: Swedish Embassy, Berlin

The Ambassador of Sweden to Germany (known formally as the Ambassador of the Kingdom of Sweden to the Federal Republic of Germany) is the official representative of the government of Sweden to the president of Germany and government of Germany.

== Electorate of Brandenburg (1157–1815) ==
Name	Period	Title	Notes	Ref
Anders Leijonstedt	1698–1700	Envoy extraordinary		

== Electorate of Brunswick-Lüneburg (1692–1814) ==
Name	Period	Title	Notes	Ref
Carl Gustaf Friesendorff	1705–1710	Envoy extraordinary		

== Hannover ==
- 1699 Henning von Strahlenheim
- 1699–1711 Carl Gustaf Friesendorff

== Lower Saxon Circle ==
Name	Period	Title	Notes	Ref
Bengt Faxell	11 September 1769 – ?	Minister	In Hamburg. Instruction 20 November 1769, letter of credence 22 January 1770.	

== Free City of Frankfurt (1372–1806) ==
Name	Period	Title	Notes	Ref
Nikolaus von Haren	1741 – 20 April 1752	Envoy extraordinary	In Frankfurt am Main	

== Free and Hanseatic City of Hamburg (1510–1815) ==
Name	Period	Title	Notes	Ref
Anton Reinhold Wrangel	13 July 1836 – 1841	Chargé d'affaires		
Anton Reinhold Wrangel	1841 – 22 September 1855	Resident minister	In Hamburg, Bremen and Lübeck as well as at the grand ducal courts of Mecklenburg-Schwerin and Mecklenburg-Strelitz.	

== Imperial City of Regensburg ==
Name	Period	Title	Notes	Ref
Georg von Snoilsky	1663 – 20 January 1672	Resident	Died in office.	
Nikolaus von Haren	122 April 1734 – 1737	Chargé d'affaires		
Nikolaus von Haren	23 June 1737 – 1741	Envoy		
Knut Reinhold Bildt	1795–?	Envoy		

== Kingdom of Bavaria (1806–1825) ==
Name	Period	Title	Notes	Ref
Carl August Järta	22 April 1850 – 4 March 1852	Chargé d'affaires	In Munich. Accredited from Vienna.	

== Kingdom of Prussia (1701–1918) ==
Name	Period	Title	Notes	Ref
Anders Leijonstedt	1703–1710	Envoy extraordinary		
Johan Rosenhane	27 December 1704 – 1707	Ambassador	In Berlin.	
Carl Gustaf Friesendorff	11 June 1712 – 13 September 1715	Minister plenipotentiary	Died in office during the Siege of Stralsund.	
Mr Kirbach	1719	?		
Carl Posse	24 March 1720 – 1724	Envoy extraordinary		
Henning Gyllenborg	1743	?		
Carl Gustaf Tessin	1744–1745	Ambassador	In Berlin.	
Gustaf Wulfvenstierna	18 July 1748 – 9 May 1758	Envoy	Died in office (on his way home to Sweden).	
Gustaf Adam von Nolcken	12 September 1757 – 1761	Chargé d'affaires	In Berlin.	
Otto Jacob Zöge von Manteuffel	5 March 1766 – 1782	Envoy extraordinary		
Carl Eherenfried von Carisien	June 1787 – 21 November 1794	Envoy extraordinary	Died in office.	
Carl Fredrik von Heland	1790–?	Chargé d'affaires	In Dresden.	
Carl Gustaf Schultz von Ascheraden	29 August 1795 – 22 March 1798	Minister	Died in office.	
Lars von Engeström	6 April 1798 – 5 September 1803	Minister	In Berlin.	
Nils Gustaf Palin	1800–1805	Chargé d'affaires	In Dresden.	
Karl Gustaf von Brinkman	June 1803 – September 1803	Chargé d'affaires	In Berlin.	
Karl Gustaf von Brinkman	November 1803 – June 1805	Chargé d'affaires	In Berlin.	
Karl Gustaf von Brinkman	12 May 1807 – 7 March 1808	Envoy extraordinary and minister plenipotentiary	At the Prussian court in Memel.	
Vilhelm August Kantzow	30 April 1821 – 1822	Chargé d'affaires ad interim	In Berlin.	
Abraham Constantin Mouradgea d'Ohsson	October 1834 – 25 September 1850	Envoy	In Berlin and Dresden.	
Carl Hochschild	25 September 1850 – 1854	Envoy	In Berlin.	
Carl von und zu Mansbach	1855–1857	?		
Carl August Järta	16 December 1858 – 13 January 1865	Envoy	In Berlin, Dresden and Mecklenburg. Died in office.	

== Electorate of Saxony (1356–1806) ==
Name	Period	Title	Notes	Ref
Gustaf Zülich	1729–1732	?		
Johan August Greiffenheim	1747–1749	Minister	Also minister at the Polish court.	
Ulric Celsing	7 November 1782 – 19 April 1787	Envoy	In Dresden.	
Fredrik von Ehrenheim	19 April 1787 – 1790	Chargé d'affaires	In Dresden.	
Jacob Gustaf De la Gardie	15 August 1795 – January 1796	Envoy en mission spéciale	To the Saxon court.	

== German Empire (1871–1918) ==
Name	Period	Title	Notes	Ref
Frederik Georg Knut Due	October 1869 – November 1873	Envoy		
Gillis Bildt	3 March 1874 – 21 August 1886	Envoy extraordinary and minister plenipotentiary	In Berlin, also in Dresden on 21 April 1875, and in Karlsruhe on 27 April 1881.	
Alfred Lagerheim	29 October 1886 – 1899	Envoy extraordinary and minister plenipotentiary	In Berlin, Karlsruhe, and Dresden. In Munich from 28 May 1890.	
Arvid Taube	28 February 1900 – 30 April 1909	Envoy extraordinary and minister plenipotentiary	Imperial German as well as the Bavarian, Saxon, and Baden courts.	
Eric Trolle	30 April 1909 – 1912	Envoy extraordinary and minister plenipotentiary	Imperial German as well as the Bavarian, Saxon, and Baden courts.	
Arvid Taube	1 April 1912 – 14 October 1916	Envoy extraordinary and minister plenipotentiary	Died in office.	
Hans-Henrik von Essen	13 February 1917 – 1918	Ministre plénipotentiaire en misson spéciale	In Berlin, Dresden, Karlsruhe, Munich, and Stuttgart.	

== Weimar Republic (1918–1933) ==
Name	Period	Title	Notes	Ref
Hans-Henrik von Essen	20 June 1919 – 1920	Minister plenipotentiary en misson spéciale	To the German Reich.	
Patrik Reuterswärd	1920–1920	Chargé d'affaires ad interim		
Hans-Henrik von Essen	14 May 1920 – 31 January 1923	Envoy	To the German Reich. Died in office.	
Patrik Reuterswärd	1921–1921	Chargé d'affaires ad interim		
Fredrik Ramel	23 February 1923 – 1925	Envoy		
Einar af Wirsén	26 September 1926 – 1937	Envoy		

== Nazi Germany (1933–1945) ==
Name	Period	Title	Notes	Ref
Arvid Richert	29 January 1937 – 23 April 1945	Envoy		

== West Germany (1949–1990) ==
Name	Period	Title	Notes	Ref
Ragnar Kumlin	1951–1956	Ambassador		
Ole Jödahl	1956–1967	Ambassador		
Nils Montan	1967–1972	Ambassador		
Sven Backlund	1972–1983	Ambassador		
Lennart Eckerberg	1983–1990	Ambassador		

== East Germany (1949–1990) ==
Name	Period	Title	Notes	Ref
Carl Johan Rappe	1973–1976	Ambassador		
Eric Virgin	1976−1982	Ambassador		
Rune Nyström	1982–1985	Ambassador		
Henrik Liljegren	1985–1989	Ambassador		
Vidar Hellners	1989–1990	Ambassador		

== Federal Republic of Germany (1990–present) ==
Name	Period	Title	Notes	Presented credentials	Ref
Torsten Örn	1990–1994	Ambassador			
Örjan Berner	1994–1996	Ambassador			
Mats Hellström	1996–2001	Ambassador			
Carl Tham	2002–2006	Ambassador			
Ruth Jacoby	2006–2010	Ambassador			
Staffan Carlsson	2010–2015	Ambassador			
Lars Danielsson	2015–2017	Ambassador			
Per Thöresson	March 2017 – 2023	Ambassador			
Veronika Wand-Danielsson	August 2023 – present	Ambassador		27 September 2023	

== See also ==
- Germany–Sweden relations
- Embassy of Sweden, Berlin
- List of ambassadors of Germany to Sweden
