= List of governors of Östergötland County =

Governor of Östergötland County
- Landshövding i Östergötlands län
- Coat of arms of Östergötland County.

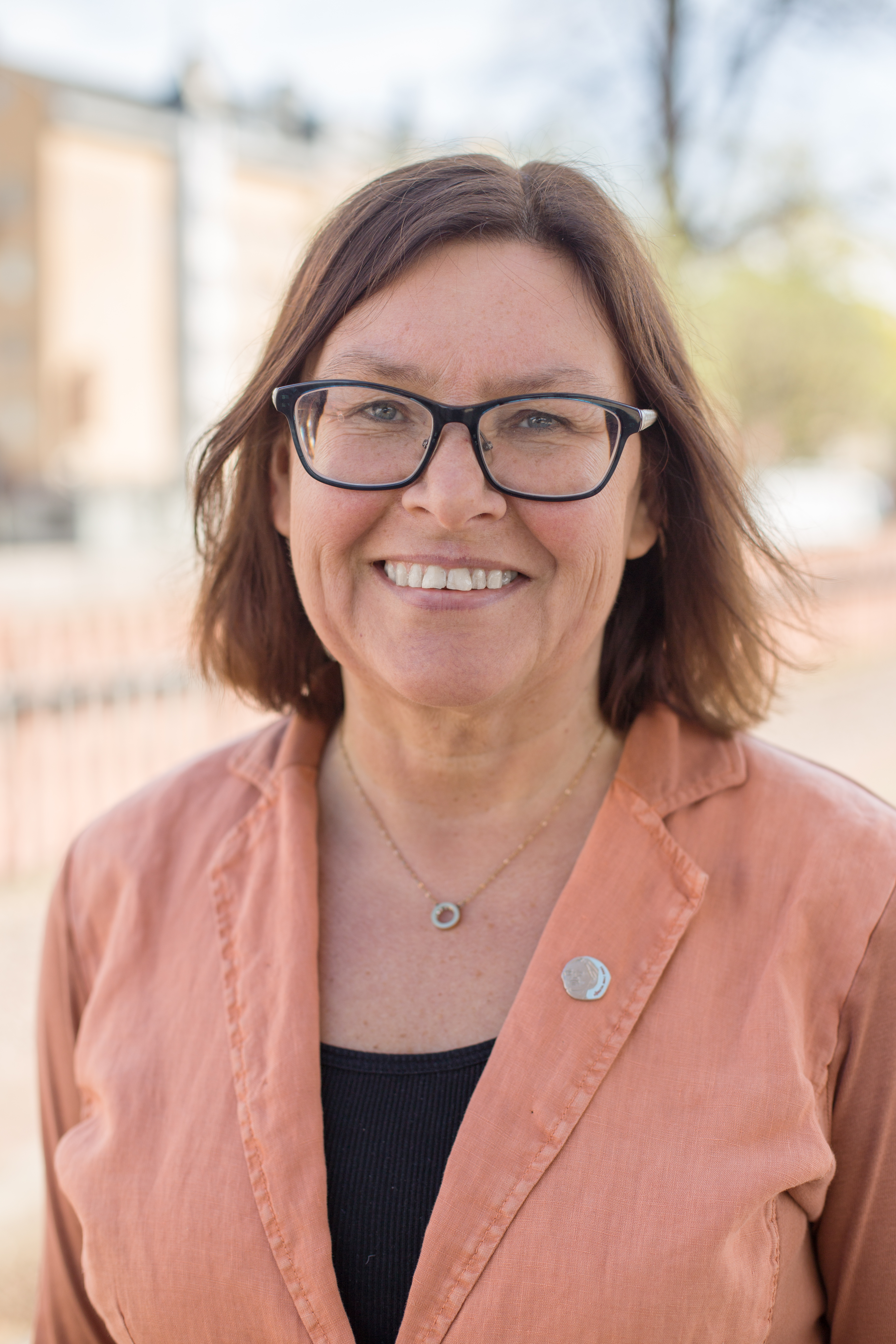
- Incumbent; Gunilla Svantorp since 1 March 2025
- Östergötland County Administrative Board
- Residence: Linköping Castle, Linköping
- Appointer: Government of Sweden
- Term length: Six years (Note: The governor is often appointed for a six-year mandate. It can be extended if the person has not reached retirement age.)
- Formation: 1693
- First holder: Lars Eldstierna
- Deputy: County Director (Länsrådet)
- Salary: SEK 97,800/month (2017)
- Website: Governor of Östergötland

This is a list of governors for Östergötland County of Sweden, from 1693 to present.

- Lars Eldstierna (1693–1701)
- Mårten Trotzig (1702–1706)
- Jakob Burensköld (1706–1710)
- Johan Lillienstedt (1710–1714)
- Anders Leijonhielm (1714–1718)
- Gustaf Bonde (1718–1721)
- Ernst Johan Creutz (1721–1727)
- Erik Ehrenkrona (1727–1736)
- Christer Henrik d'Albedyhll (1736–1747)
- Gustaf Adolf Lagerfelt (1748–1769)
- Carl Harald Strömfelt (1769–1775)
- Fredric Ulric Reenstierna (1775–1783)
- Fredrik Georg Strömfelt (1783–1810)
- Johan Adam Cronstedt (1810–1817)
- Carl Nieroth (1817–1826)
- Gustaf Wathier Hamilton (1826–1835)
- Carl Otto Palmstierna (1836–1851)
- Henning Hamilton (1851–1858)
- Gustaf af Ugglas (1858–1869)
- Robert de la Gardie (1869–1901)
- Ludvig Douglas (1901–1912)
- Eric Trolle (1912–1930)
- Karl Tiselius (1930–1941)
- Carl Hamilton (1941–1956)
- Per Eckerberg (1956–1980)
- Göte Svenson (1980–1987)
- Rolf Wirtén (1987–1996)
- Björn Eriksson (1996–2009)
- Magnus Holgersson (acting; 2009–2010)
- Elisabeth Nilsson (2010–2018)
- Carl Fredrik Graf (2018–2024)
- Ann Holmlid (acting; 2024–2025)
- Gunilla Svantorp (2025–present)
