= Eric Trolle =

Eric Trolle may refer to:

- Erik Trolle (c. 1460–1530), regent of Sweden
- Eric Trolle (diplomat) (1863–1934), Swedish diplomat
