= List of ambassadors of Sweden to France =

Ambassador of Sweden to France
- Lesser coat of arms of the Kingdom of Sweden

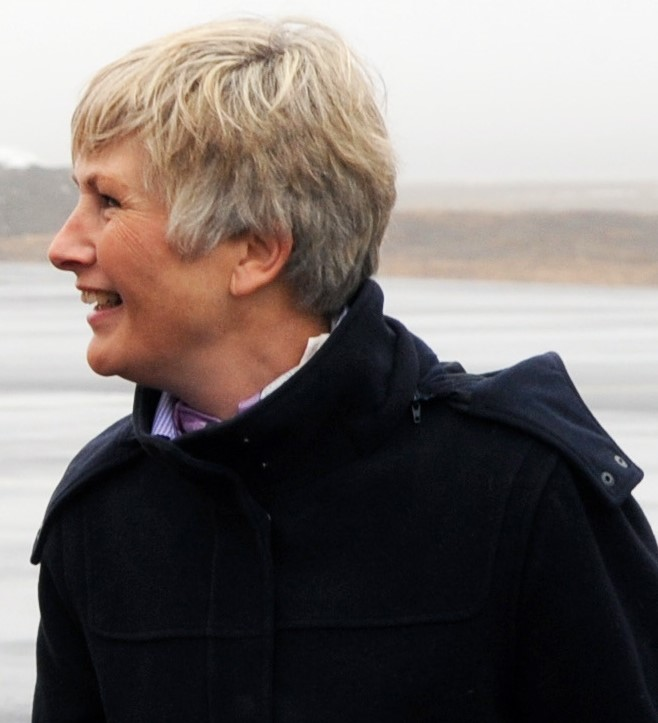
- Incumbent; Caroline Vicini since 2025
- Ministry for Foreign Affairs; Swedish Embassy, Paris
- Style: His or Her Excellency (formal); Mr. or Madam Ambassador (informal)
- Reports to: Minister for Foreign Affairs
- Residence: 17 rue Barbet de Jouy (Note: The ambassador's residence is at the same location as the chancery.)
- Seat: Paris, France
- Appointer: Government of Sweden
- Term length: No fixed term
- Inaugural holder: Hugo Grotius
- Formation: 1634
- Website: Swedish Embassy, Paris

The Ambassador of Sweden to France (known formally as the Ambassador of the Kingdom of Sweden to the French Republic) is the official representative of the government of Sweden to the president of France and the government of France.

== List of representatives ==
Name	Period	Title	Resident / Concurrent accreditation	Notes	Presented credentials	Ref
Kingdom of France (–1792)
Hugo Grotius	1634–1645	?				
Schering Rosenhane	1647–1649	Ambassador	Power of attorney on 29 November 1647			
Clas Åkesson Tott	1661–1662	?				
Otto Wilhelm Königsmarck	April 1666 – 1667	Ambassador		Power of attorney on 31 May 1665		
Clas Åkesson Tott	1672–1674	?		Second term		
Carl Bonde	7 October 1674 – ?	Envoy extraordinary				
Nils Lillieroot	9 November 1677 – November 1677	Envoy extraordinary				
Nils Lillieroot	31 March 1681 — 1689	Envoy		With a break in service in 1686		
Johan Palmquist	6 April 1697 – 1702	Resident				
Daniel Cronström	13 August 1702 – 3 November 1703	Resident				
Daniel Cronström	4 November 1703 – 30 August 1719	Envoy extraordinary		Died in office		
Carl Gustaf Bielke	19 October 1719 – 27 February 1721	Envoy extraordinary				
Niclas Peter von Gedda	6 May 1721 – 1725	Resident				
Niclas Peter von Gedda	16 August 1725 – 1728	Envoy				
Niclas Peter von Gedda	1 December 1730 – 1736	Minister Plenipotentiary				
Per Axel Fleming	1738–1742	Minister				
Carl Gustaf Tessin	1739–1742	Minister Plenipotentiary				
Claes Ekeblad	1742–1744	Envoy				
Carl Fredrik Scheffer	February 1744 – 1752	Envoy				
Ulrik Scheffer	1752–1763	Envoy				
Ulrik Scheffer	1763–1765	Ambassador				
Gustaf Philip Creutz	7 January 1766 – 1772	Envoy				
Gustaf Philip Creutz	6 October 1772 – 1783	Ambassador				
Erik Magnus Staël von Holstein	May 1783 – 1783	Chargé d'affaires				
Erik Magnus Staël von Holstein	31 July 1783 – 1783	Minister Plenipotentiary				
Erik Magnus Staël von Holstein	24 November 1783 – February 1792	Ambassador				
French First Republic (1792–1804)
Erik Magnus Staël von Holstein	25 February 1793 – November 1793	Ambassador				
Erik Magnus Staël von Holstein	23 February 1795 – August 1796	Ambassador				
Carl Gustaf König	22 November 1796 – 1797	Chargé d'affaires				
Erik Magnus Staël von Holstein	20 February 1798 – 1798	Commissioner Plenipotentiary				
Erik Magnus Staël von Holstein	4 April 1798 – 13 July 1799	Minister Plenipotentiary				
Carl August Ehrensvärd	23 May 1801 – 28 March 1804	Envoy Extraordinary and Minister Plenipotentiary				
French Republic (1804–1808) and First French Empire (1808–1815)
Gustaf Lagerbielke	8 August 1810 – 16 April 1811	Envoy				
Abraham Constantin Mouradgea d'Ohsson	24 May 1811 – 29 December 1812	Chargé d'affaires				
Kingdom of France (1815–1830)
Elof Signeul	1 October 1815 – 8 November 1817	Chargé d'affaires				
Carl Hochschild	16 October 1817 – 1818	Chargé d'affaires				
Gustaf Löwenhielm	4 April 1818 – 1830	Envoy				
Kingdom of France (1830–1848)
Gustaf Löwenhielm	1830 – 8 February 1856	Envoy				
Georg Adelswärd	8 July 1844 – 16 September 1844	Chargé d'affaires ad interim				
French Second Republic (1848–1852)
Georg Adelswärd	31 July 1850 – 8 September 1850	Chargé d'affaires ad interim				
Georg Adelswärd	12 July 1852 – 12 August 1852	Chargé d'affaires ad interim				
Second French Empire (1852–1870)
Carl August Järta	1853–1856	Chargé d'affaires				
Ludvig Manderström	8 January 1856 – 1858	Envoy				
Georg Adelswärd	15 June 1858 – 1870	Envoy				
French Third Republic (1870–1940)
Georg Adelswärd	1870 – 14 December 1877	Envoy				
Georg Sibbern	1878–1884	Envoy				
Carl Lewenhaupt	30 September 1884 – 1889	Envoy				
Gustaf Adolf Sixten Axel August Lewenhaupt	1 November 1889 – 21 November 1889	Chargé d'affaires				
Frederik Georg Knut Due	1890–1899	Envoy				
Henrik Åkerman	1899 – 13 June 1905	Envoy		Died in office		
August Gyldenstolpe	1905–1918	Envoy				
Albert Ehrensvärd	11 June 1918 – 4 May 1934	Envoy				
Einar Hennings	1934–1940	Envoy				
French State (1940–1944)
Einar Hennings	1940–1944	Envoy				
Provisional Government of the French Republic (1944–1946)
Erik Boheman	1944–1946	Envoy				
French Fourth Republic (1946–1958)
Erik Boheman	1946–1947	Envoy				
Karl Ivan Westman	1947 – 15 October 1947	Envoy				
Karl Ivan Westman	15 October 1947 – 1956	Ambassador				
Ragnar Kumlin	1956–1958	Ambassador				
French Fifth Republic (1958–present)
Ragnar Kumlin	1958–1965	Ambassador				
Rolf Sohlman	2 November 1965 – 23 July 1967	Ambassador		Died in office		
Gunnar Hägglöf	1967–1971	Ambassador				
Ingemar Hägglöf	1971–1978	Ambassador				
Sverker Åström	1978–1982	Ambassador				
Carl Lidbom	1982–1992	Ambassador		Political appointee (non-career diplomat)		
Stig Brattström	1992–1996	Ambassador				
Örjan Berner	1996–2001	Ambassador				
Frank Belfrage	2001–2006	Ambassador				
Krister Kumlin	2006–2007	Chargé d'affaires ad interim				
Gunnar Lund	2007–2014	Ambassador	Also accredited to Monaco (from 2009)			
Veronika Wand-Danielsson	2014–2020	Ambassador	Also accredited to Monaco			
Håkan Åkesson	September 2020 – 2025	Ambassador	Also accredited to Monaco			
Caroline Vicini	2025–present	Ambassador	Also accredited to Monaco			

== Gallery ==
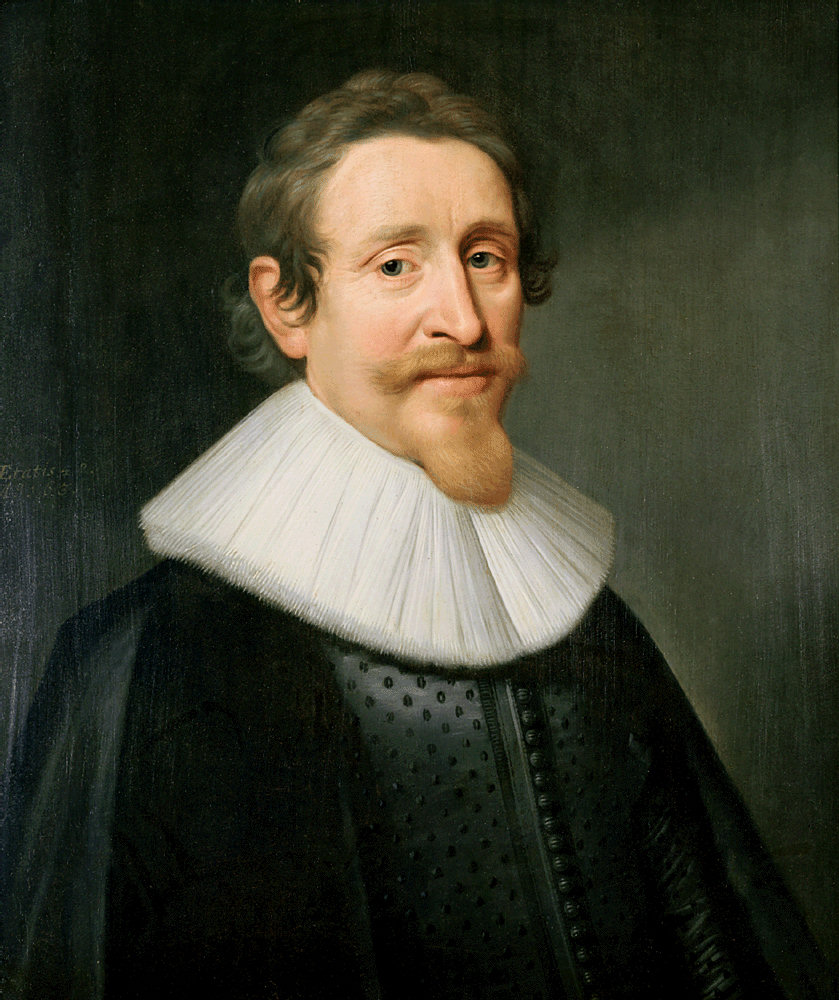
Hugo Grotius

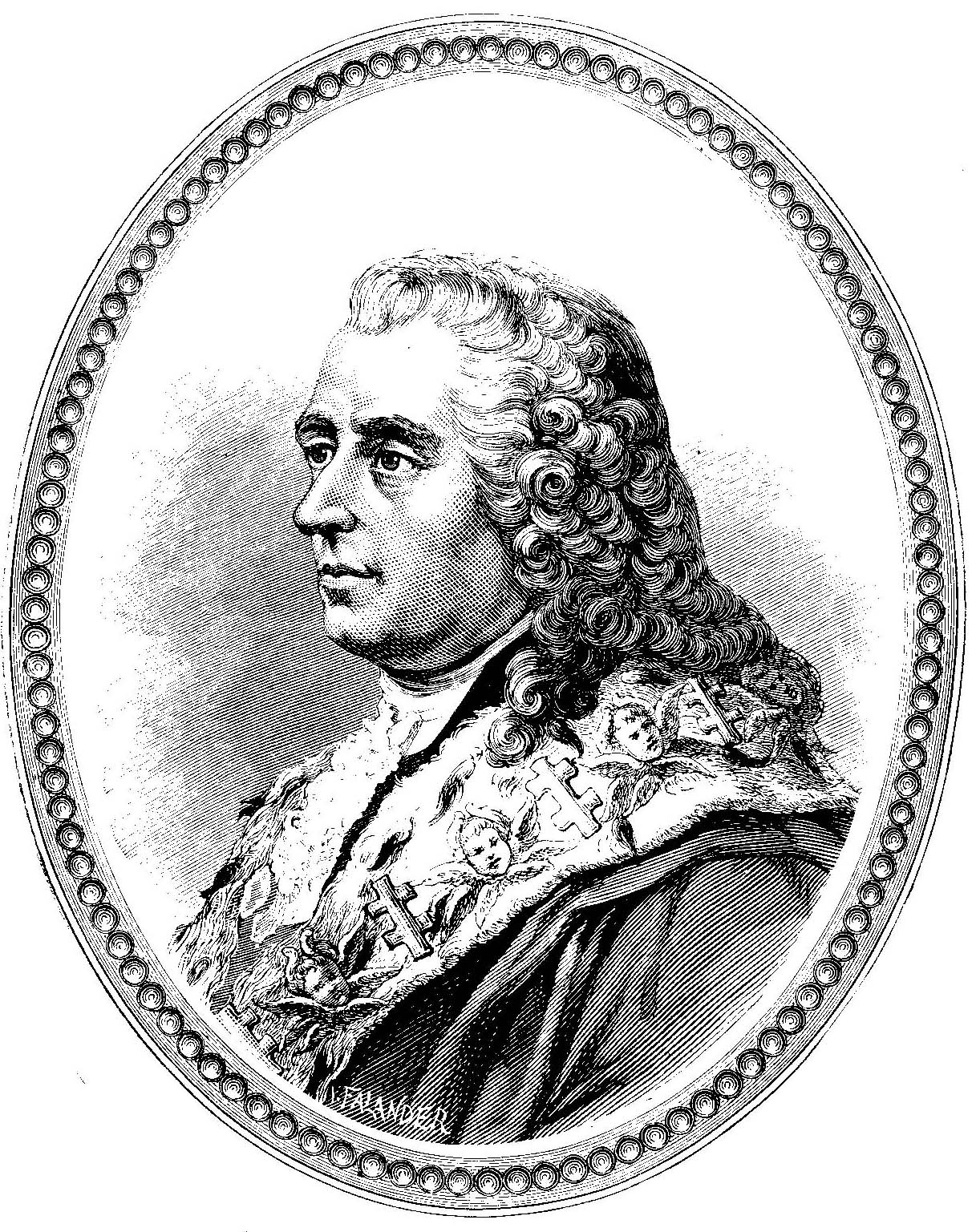
Carl Gustaf Tessin

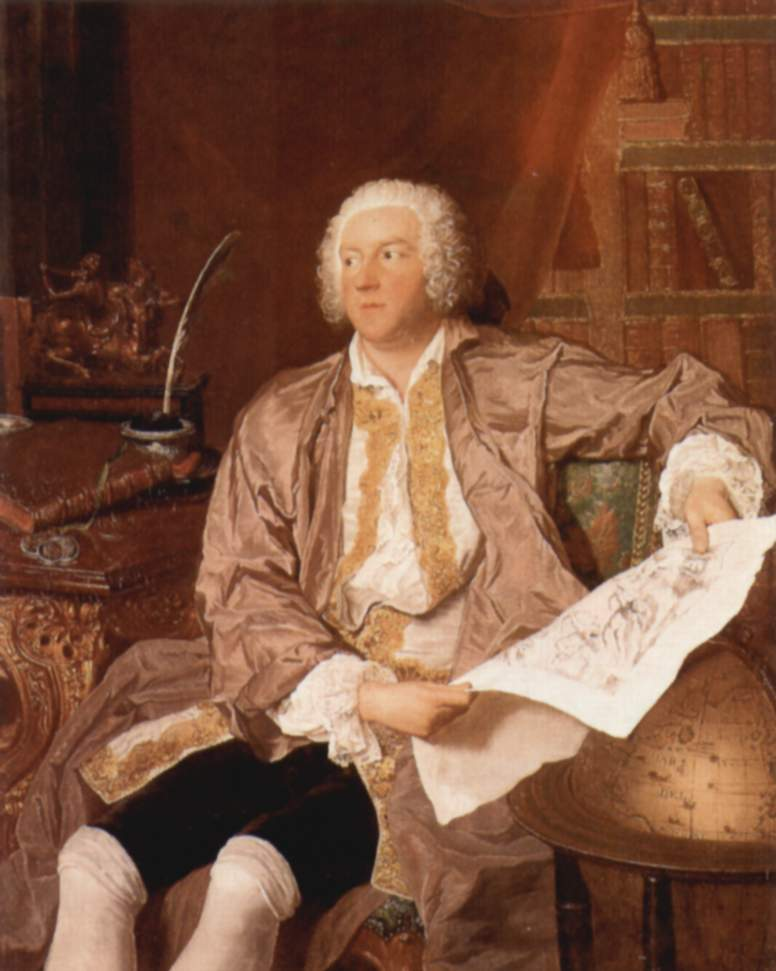
Carl Gustaf Tessin

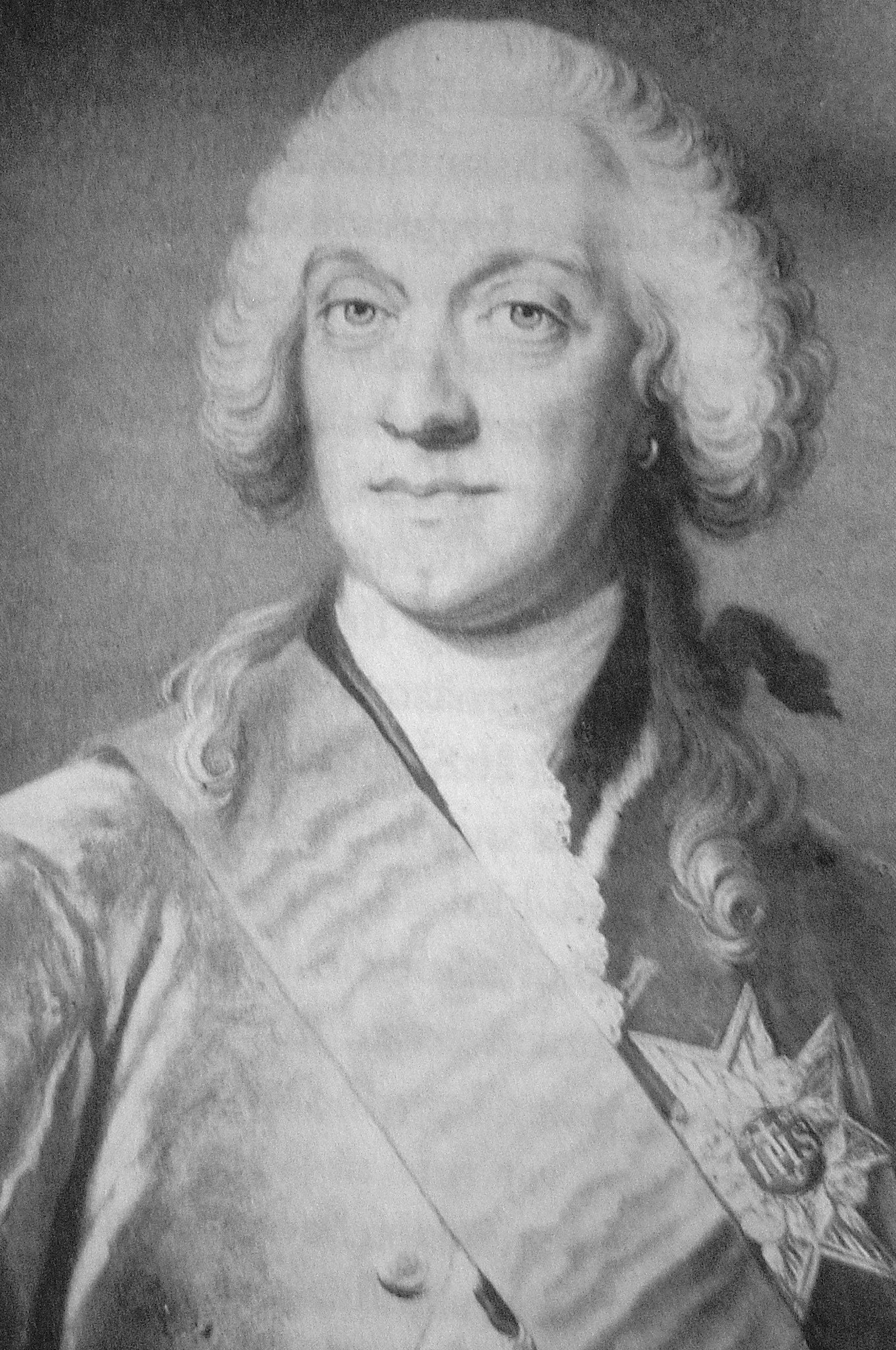
Claes Ekeblad

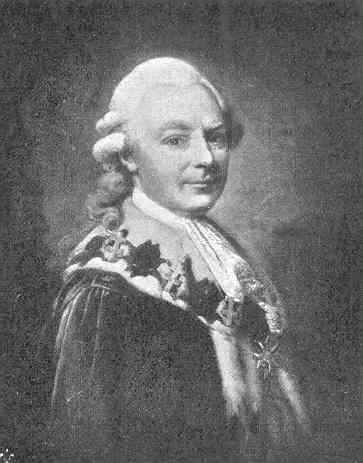
Gustaf Filip Creutz

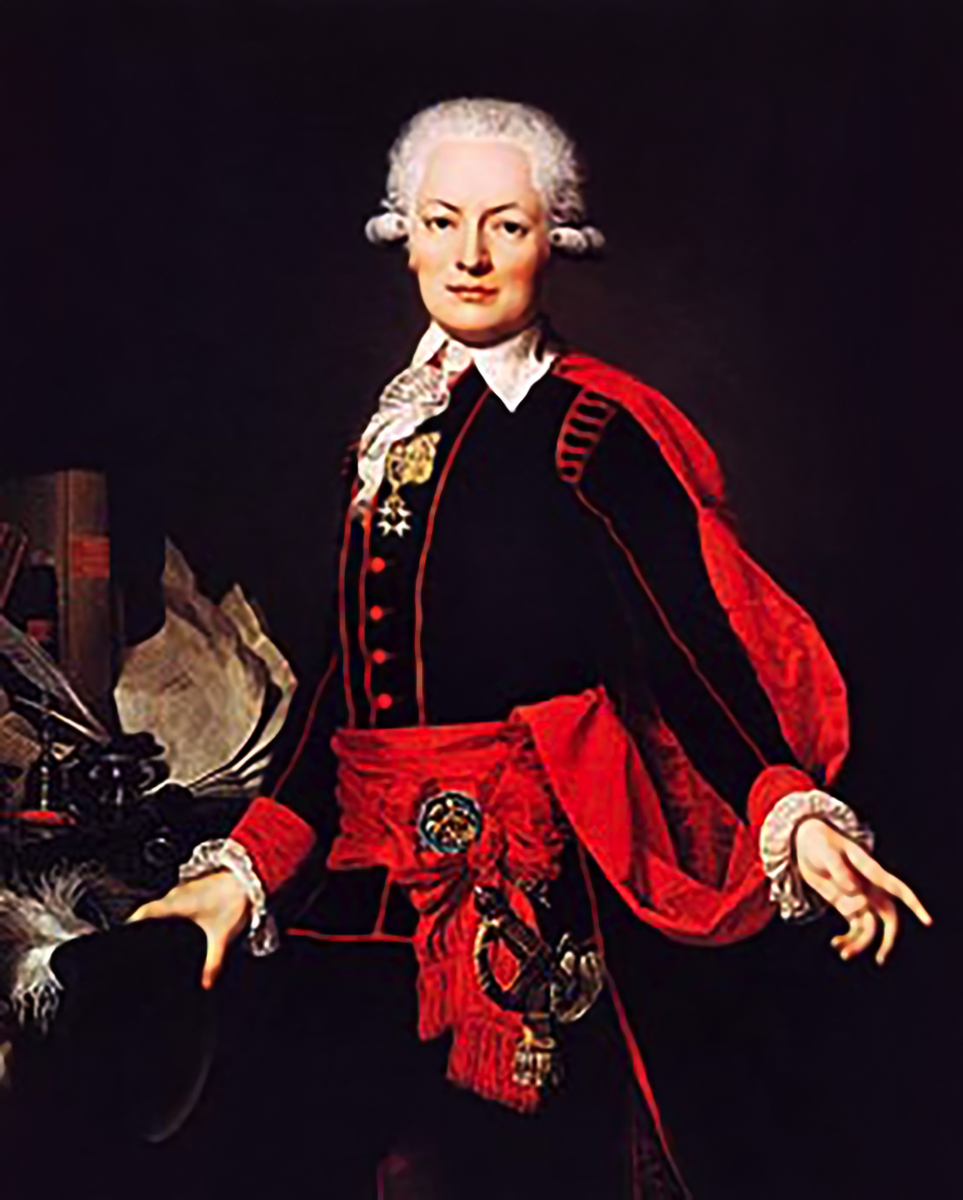
Erik Magnus Staël von Holstein

== See also ==
- France–Sweden relations
- Embassy of Sweden, Paris
