= Veronika Wand-Danielsson =

Swedish activist and diplomat

Her Excellency Veronika Wand-Danielsson
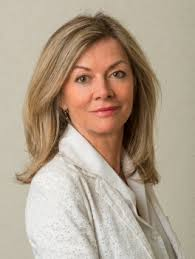
- Wand-Danielsson in 2010

Ambassador of Sweden to Germany
- Incumbent
- Assumed office August 2023
- Preceded by: Per Thöresson

Ambassador of Sweden to France
- In office 2014–2020
- Preceded by: Gunnar Lund
- Succeeded by: Håkan Åkesson

Personal details
- Born: 9 March 1959 (age 67) Stockholm, Sweden
- Spouse: Christian Danielsson
- Education: Stockholm University; Sciences Po; Uppsala University
- Occupation: Diplomat

Veronika Wand-Danielsson (born 9 March 1959) is a Swedish diplomat who has been the incumbent ambassador to Germany since 2023, France from 2014 to 2020, and NATO from 2007 to 2014. She became the first female ambassador of Sweden to France and Monaco in 2014.

== Early life and education ==
Wand-Danielsson, a diplomat's daughter, lived some of her early years in Africa. Following her education at Sciences Po Paris, among others.

== Diplomatic career ==
Wand-Danielsson has a background in foreign policy. Prior to joining the Ministry of Foreign Affairs in 1990 and taking on responsibility for UN relations, she had worked at the OECD/DAC in Paris. After that, she worked at the aid directorate of the European Commission and as Sweden's permanent representative to the EU in Brussels, where she oversaw projects like the Lisbon Treaty and the EU's long-term budget.

=== NATO ===
Wand-Danielsson was appointed Sweden's NATO ambassador in 2007. She gave a mildly humorous account of the selection procedure. By 2014, managing a demanding portfolio while collaborating with military colleagues in a setting where men dominated. Sweden created history that same year when it unveiled the first openly "feminist" foreign policy in history, placing women's rights and gender equality at the top of its diplomatic agenda. In her initial reaction, she drew attention to the difficult decision that female diplomats have frequently had to make when asked to represent government initiatives for gender equality in public.

=== France ===
In 2014, Wand-Danielsson took the lead in spearheading the new feminist foreign policy initiatives after being appointed ambassador to France. Along with Geraldine Byrne Nason, Wand-Danielsson broadened her influence by starting a network for female ambassadors in Paris. She was already associated with the Women in International Security program during her time at NATO. The Paris group meets regularly with colleagues and female ambassadors from every continent.

Wand-Danielsson claimed that her purpose for coming was to repair business relations. An era was to begin with the royal family's visit to France at the end of 2014. This momentum was halted significantly by the terrorist attacks in 2015.

=== Germany ===
Wand-Danielsson was appointed by the Government of Sweden as the new ambassador to Berlin. At that time, she was in charge of the Foreign Ministry's Europe and North America division. August marks the official start to her new role. On 8 November 2023, she was greeted by Stone Sizani.

== Personal life ==
Wand-Danielsson is married to Christian Danielsson (born 1956), state secretary to Minister for EU Affairs, together they have two children.

== Honours ==
=== National ===
- H. M. The King's Medal (28 January 2020)

=== Foreign ===
- France:
  - Grand Officer of the National Order of Merit
- Estonia:
  - Order of the Cross of Terra Mariana 3rd Class (2 May 2023)

Diplomatic posts
Preceded by Per Anderman	Permanent Delegate of Sweden to NATO; 2007–2014	Succeeded by Håkan Malmqvist
Preceded by Gunnar Lund	Ambassador of Sweden to France; 2014–2020	Succeeded by Håkan Åkesson
Preceded by Per Thöresson	Ambassador of Sweden to Germany; 2023–present	Succeeded by Incumbent
