= Erling Folkvord =

Norwegian politician (1949–2024)

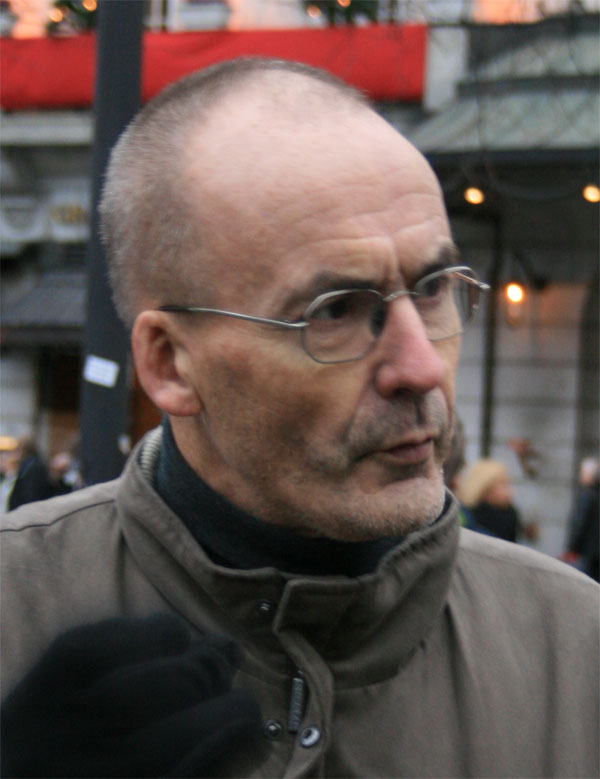
- Erling Folkvord in 2009

Member of the Norwegian Parliament for Oslo
- In office 14 September 1993 – 14 September 1997

Member of the Oslo City Council
- In office 10 September 1999 – 2011
- In office 10 September 1983 – 10 September 1993

Personal details
- Born: 15 June 1949 Levanger, Norway
- Died: 1 March 2024 (aged 74) Stockholm, Sweden
- Party: Red Party
- Other political affiliations: Red Electoral Alliance; Workers' Communist Party
- Relations: Magnhild Folkvord (sister)
- Children: Jorunn Folkvord (daughter)
- Education: Examen artium
- Occupation: Politician
- Profession: Social Worker

Erling Folkvord (15 June 1949 – 1 March 2024) was a Norwegian politician for the Red Party and a member of the Parliament of Norway. A revolutionary socialist, he was one of the leading members of the Workers' Communist Party and the Red Electoral Alliance before they merged to form Red. He sat as a member of the Parliament of Norway from 1993 to 1997, becoming the first socialist to the left of the Socialist Left Party and the Labour Party in parliament since 1961. He later lost his position in 1997 and was a candidate for parliament until his death. He was a member of the Oslo City Council from 1983 to 1993, and again from 1999 to 2011. Folkvord became one of the best-known Norwegian politicians on the left who was not connected with the Labour Party and the Socialist Left Party.

In the early part of his political career, Folkvord was a member of the Red Electoral Alliance. Known for working on several corruption cases earned him the nickname the "watch dog". Folkvord's political views turned to communism and anti-capitalism when he became a member of the Workers' Communist Party. From 1990 to 1997, he was Deputy Leader of the Workers' Communist Party, and in 2001 he became Deputy Leader of the Red Electoral Alliance alongside Chris Hartmann.

== Early life and career ==
Folkvord was born in Levanger, Norway on 15 June 1949. He was the son of school principal Sverre Folkvord and housewife Eldrid Kjesbu. He finished secondary school earning the examen artium degree in Trondheim and then started studies to become a social worker at the Social School of Trondheim. By 1976, he was the leader of the national Social Agencies Union serving until 1978. In 1982, along with fellow Red Electoral Alliance member Harald Stabell, Folkvord sued Oslo's social-office leading figures, Signe M. Stray Ryssdal and Marit Moe. They accused them of misconduct and of making a false accusation which led to an innocent man going to prison. These accusations eventually led to a police investigation into the matter. After finding no proof of their accusations, Moe sued Folkvord and Stabell for defamatatory charges made against her, but she abstained from pursuing this in court.

Folkvord and Stabell reported to the police that the Norwegian newspaper Dagbladet breached the pimp paragraph of the criminal code. In an interview Folkvord stated that Dagbladet contributed to giving the Norwegian sex market more attention.

== Political career ==
=== Council representative ===
In 1983, Folkvord, along with Liv Finstad, was elected as Red Electoral Alliance representative for the Oslo City Council, taking office on 1 January 1984. According to Aftenposten, the Red Electoral Alliance and the Christian Democratic Party had the most loyal voter base throughout the election. Folkvord was later highly vocal in his opposition toward the decentralisation of health and social services in Oslo where control was to be given to the boroughs. During his early years as member of the City Council, Folkvord used most of his time in defending the then "current" social administration.

By the late 1980s, Folkvord had earned the nickname "watch dog", as he usually wanted an "independent investigation" into corruption matters. This eventually developed into one of his most well-known public traits. When leading an investigation into a corruption case in 1989, which involved several representatives of the Oslo City Council, he said "It is possible to sweep corruption and other non-essential nonsense out of City Hall. People only need to persist where necessary". Earlier that year, when finding more proof of a so-called corruption scandal, Folkvord asked for assistance from the district attorney urging him to lead an investigation into the matter.

By 1990, there were talks within the Red Electoral Alliance toward replacing Folkvord and Athar Ali as City Council representatives in Oslo to make way for more women in the top positions within the party. Folkvord was kept since he was a well-known face with the Norwegian media. By September 1990, Folkvord had demanded a police-run investigation against Conservative Party member Michael Tetzschner, accusing him of corruption and hidden money. These charges were included in a broadcast by the Norwegian Broadcasting Corporation (NRK). Tetzschner replied to this broadcast stating that "The news feature was completely dominated by false information. If the television provider does not make the corrections that are necessary, we'll bring the case to the Complaints Board of the Broadcasting Corporation". Folkvord was one of the co-founders of the Oslo party cell, established in early 1991, of the Red Electoral Alliance. While media speculated that he would become the chapter's leader, he denied any such allegations, saying there were "better suited people" then him for that post.

=== Parliament ===
Folkvord was elected the Red Electoral Alliance's Oslo lead candidate in June 1992. The decision was made based on party leader Aksel Nærstad's belief that Folkvord could easily win a seat since he had become a "national celebrity" of sorts and due to the support Folkvord enjoyed during the 1989 parliamentary election. Folkvord needed 14,000 votes to earn a seat in parliament. In January 1993, at the national convention, several long-standing members discussed the best way to organise Folkvord's Oslo electoral campaign. There was optimism among these members, as they, along with Nærstad, believed beforehand that Folkvord would be elected to parliament. The Red Electoral Alliance spent a total of 600,000 kr for their nationwide 1993 election campaign, of which two-thirds were used to support Folkvord's campaign in Oslo. At the conclusion of the elections, the party managed to become the biggest party in six different constituencies: Grünerløkka, Ankertorget, Tøyen, Kampen, Vålerenga and Gamlebyen. Various analysts, and Folkvord himself, believed the Red Electoral Alliance achieved good results in Oslo because the Socialist Left Party performed poorly in the municipalities.

When asked what parliamentary committee he wanted to be a member of, Folkvord replied that the Standing Committee on Finance and Economic Affairs would be an ideal choice because most of the "assaults" on the working man had their origins in that committee. He was then selected for that very committee in addition to a seat on the Election Committee. He later became elected as a member of the financial committee of parliament.

In 1994, Folkvord criticised the Labour Government for exporting weapons to Turkey, which at that time was engaged in a civil war against the Kurdish people. He claimed it violated a parliamentary decision made in 1959 which said that the government would not distribute, or export, weapons to countries involved in a civil war. Folkvord earned the support of the Socialist Left, the Centre Party and the Christian Democratic Party who all sought to end weapon exports to Turkey. The Conservative Party supported the Labour Party's decision, with the then party leader Jan Petersen claiming that the Kurdish liberators were "terrorists". According to Arbeiderbladet the Norwegian Government had sold 99 million kr worth of weapons to the Turkish Government in 1989 alone. Folkvord sent a letter to Bjørn Tore Godal, the then Minister of Foreign Affairs, and asked if the Norwegian Government had gotten the approval of the parliament's Standing Committee on Foreign Affairs and Defence to sell weapons to Turkey. In a 1967 decree, it became illegal to sell weapons to civil war-torn countries, and Folkvord believed that Norway should stop selling weapons to a country which he considered to be embroiled in civil war.

On 1 September 1995, Folkvord was arrested by Turkish law enforcement in the Kurdish city of Diyarbakir. The Turkish Government said the main reason for his visit was to attend an illegal Kurdish peace festival. That very same day he was flown to Ankara, and later Istanbul, and he was delivered back to Norway the following day. Nicolas Rea, a member of the British House of Lords, took a picture of Folkvord during the event. It was claimed that the picture showed Folkvord being beaten by Turkish officials and that the picture was in-turn burnt by the Turkish police when they saw Rea had a camera.

In early 1995, Folkvord announced that he would not be a candidate for parliament when his term was over. He later claimed the job was "exhausting and stressful". In an opinion poll, conducted in August 1997, Folkvords popularity in Oslo had declined while his popularity outside Oslo had increased. During the election, the party used 500,000 kr on Folkvord's re-election campaign, which was estimated to be roughly 70% of the party's budget, which was estimated to be approximately 700,000 kr. On 12 September, various opinion polls showed that Folkvord's popularity had increased again in Oslo which gave rise to speculation that Folkvord would win Inger Lise Husøy's seat in parliament because of this sudden rise in popularity. When 99% of the vote in Oslo had been counted, the party had managed to earn a disappointing 3.9%, losing its only seat.

=== 1999 to the 2003 elections ===
After losing his position in parliament, Folkvord went through a short period of obscurity. He once again earned media attention when he publicly denounced the Lund Commission. The commission revealed there had been extensive surveillance of Norwegian communists, socialists and other radicals by the Norwegian Police Security Service. Folkvord demanded to be shown his own documentation created during the surveillance. In 1999, Folkvord topped his party's list of candidates running for a seat in the City Council. Folkvord was successful and earned a seat on the City Council while the party noted an increased support of 1.3%. Folkvord's main goal during the campaign was to earn a third seat for the Red Electoral Alliance, he failed to do so though the party held its two seats on the City Council. The party earned 2% and 2.1% of the votes in the county and municipal elections of 1999, respectively.

Before the 2001 parliamentary election, both Aslak Sira Myhre, leader of the Red Electoral Alliance, and Folkvord stated their intentions of being top candidate for the Red Electoral Alliance. Later, when hearing that Myhre sought to become the party's lead candidate in Oslo, Folkvord told the media he would become third candidate if he was not elected to become the party's lead candidate. A vote was held at the party convention, which resulted in 50 votes for and 62 against Folkvord as lead candidate. Folkvord became third candidate, and Sigrid Angen became second candidate.

By February 2001, the Workers' Communist Party proposed making Folkvord the new leader of the Red Electoral Alliance, since Myhre would resign if he was elected to parliament. While the majority of the members wanted a female leader after the departure of Myhre, his supporters were perfectly aware that Folkvord could lose the nomination and a campaign was started to make him deputy leader. The main problem for Folkvord's opposition was his close ties to the Workers' Communist Party. At the convention, Myhre was re-elected the party's party leader, with Folkvord and Chris Hartmann stepping in as the party's new deputy leaders. Myhre did not become a member of parliament.

By March 2003, Myhre had resigned as leader and Torstein Dahle was elected as his successor. Dahle was the leading figure of the Red Electoral Alliance in Hordaland since the 1990s. When commenting on his resignation, Myhre commented on his 2001 election in Oslo saying "it is sad to resign after a bad election". During the 2003 local elections three different polls showed that the Red Electoral Alliance was close to earning three seats on the Oslo City Council. Folkvord stated that if the party managed to earn one extra seat, he would use it to try removing the right-wing Conservative Party from power and replace them with a more left-wing "leaning choice", such as the Labour Party or the Socialist Left Party. The party increased its vote by 0.1%, earning the party 3.1% of the popular vote in Oslo. The party was not able to win a third seat, retaining the two they held.

=== Later years: 2004-2011 ===
In February 2004, Folkvord was charged with violating the penal code as he had participated in a demonstration against the Invasion of Iraq in 2003. Together with other demonstrators, he effectively cut off the entrance to the office of Kristin Krohn, the Minister of Defence. Folkvord was accused in a statement saying "his refusal to walk away from the area where it was held an illegal demonstration, despite the fact that he was asked to leave the area". After the incident he received a fine of 2000 kr which he refused to pay.

At the Red Electoral Alliance's city convention, Folkvord was elected their lead candidate in Oslo for the 2005 election. Folkvord, along with Torstein Dahle, were the only representatives from the party who had a chance of gaining a seat in parliament. Jens Stoltenberg, leader of the Labour Party, was negative toward the idea of having any representatives from the Red Electoral Alliance in parliament, saying that the voters should do anything in their power to stop them from earning a seat in parliament. When the votes were counted, Folkvord did not gain a seat in parliament.

Folkvord later accused many of the prominent members of the Oslo City Council of being involved, or having been involved, in corruption. André Støylen of the Conservative Party said Folkvord should stop accusing and instead go to the police with proof if he had any.

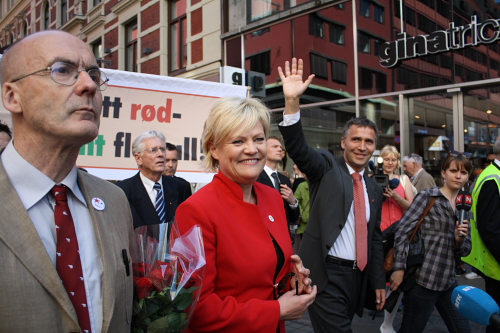
Folkvord (left) during the Oslo May Day march with Kristin Halvorsen (centre) and Jens Stoltenberg (right)

On 27 February 2007, Folkvord announced he would seek another term in the City Council. Folkvord was re-elected lead candidate for the municipal election at the party convention. In March 2007, the Red Electoral Alliance and the Workers' Communist Party merged and established Red. By 3 September, six days before the election day, Red earned its best showing ever in Oslo with 4.4% in an opinion poll – an increase of 0.3% from the previous election. When the votes for the municipality of Oslo were counted, the party managed to gain three seats on the City Council, with Folkvord's position secure. At national level, Red received 1.9% and 2.1% for the municipal and county elections respectively.

During the 2009 election, several opinion polls showed that Folkvord and Dahle had enough support to earn two seats in parliament. Jens Stoltenberg and Kristin Halvorsen from the Red-Green Coalition were both highly negative toward the idea of having Red in parliament. Folkvord stated several times that he would demand an immediate withdrawal of Norwegian troops from Afghanistan if elected to parliament. He said this decision involved both the "enthusiastic warriors of the Progress Party" and "the disillusioned skeptics of the Socialist Left". Folkvord later felt he needed to set pressure on the Labour Party which would, according to him, move them further to the left. Labour Party member Reiulf Steen had reacted positively toward the idea of having Folkvord in parliament saying, "I am a great admirer of Erling Folkvord. He has integrity and great courage. Besides I am overjoyed that Red supports the Red-Green coalition". When the votes were counted Red had an increase of 1% from the 2005 election, but it was not enough to secure Folkvord a seat in parliament. When all the votes were counted, the party had gained 1.3% of the national vote, an increase of 0.1%.

Folkvord permanently left the Oslo City Council in 2011.

== Political positions ==
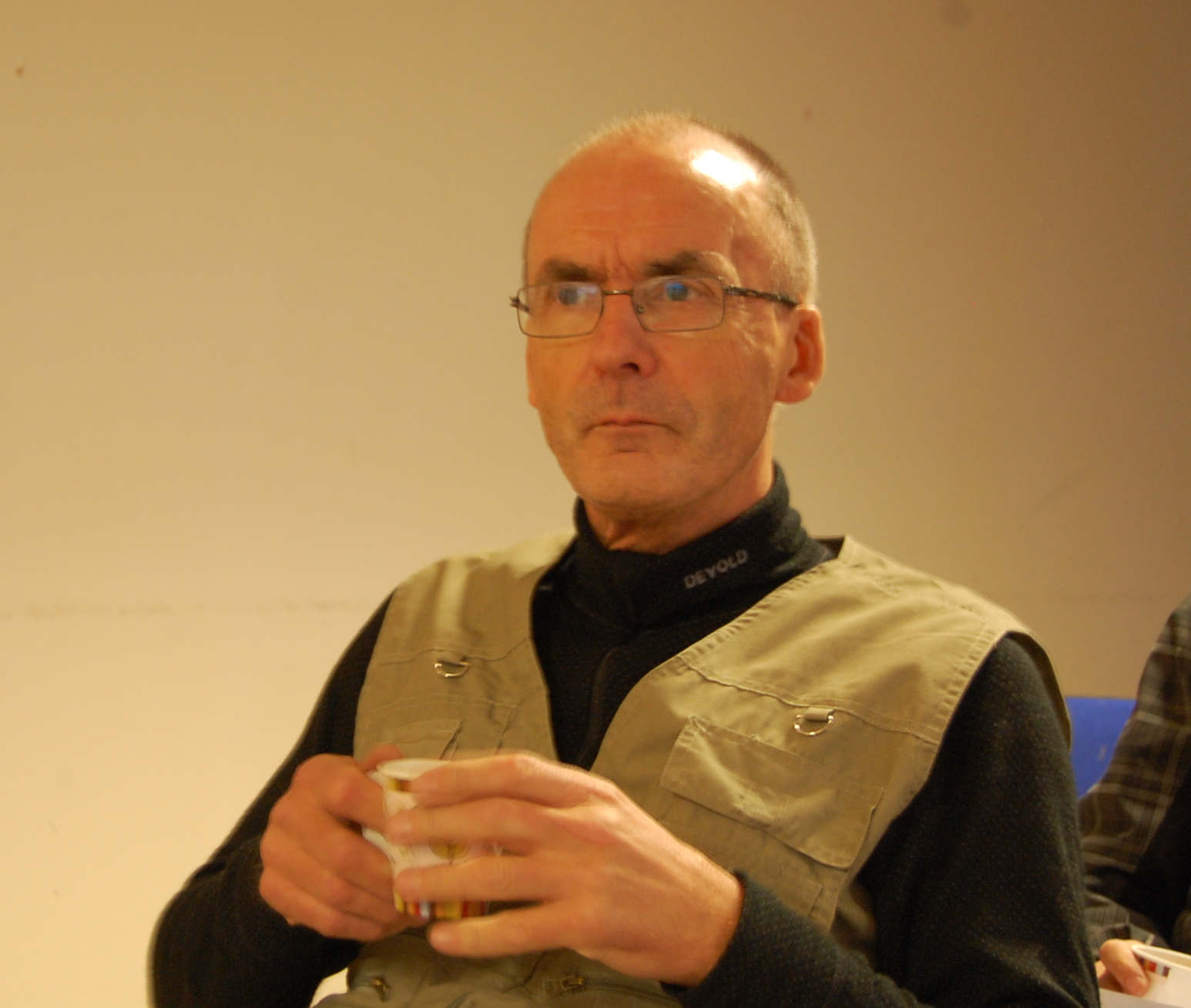
Folkvord on 31 October 2009, after the 2009 parliamentary election

During an interview in 1993, Folkvord said his most important commitment if he gained a seat in parliament was giving the National trade union centers more power so that they could better defend the working class. When asked if it was exhausting to promote socialist reforms Folkvord said, "It is. But I think in some ways easier than before [because many] fake socialist regimes have collapsed". Another opinion of his was that "capitalism destroys the natural environment around us making the bourgeois society planners understand that there must be something new in the future. This provides inspiration to win support for socialist beliefs in Norway". Folkvord's first contact with anti-capitalist beliefs came when he joined the Workers' Communist Party. The party taught him about "capitalist barbarism" and how the wealthy controlled everything. Folkvord said he believed that "[this] can't be the end of human development", and that he believes humans are destined to create another more-just system.

Folkvord long supported the Kurdish independence movement, believing that Norway and other countries in Europe should stop treating the conflicts between Turkish military and the Kurds as an internal Turkish matter. Being an anti-war activist, he was highly vocal against Norwegian involvement in the war on terror since the start of the American led invasion of Iraq. In 2009, Folkvord visited Norwegian soldiers in Afghanistan but claimed that Red was the only Norwegian party not allowed to visit the Afghan city of Meymaneh, the city were the Norwegian troops are stationed. He was also highly vocal against Norwegian membership in the European Union, claiming the organisation is spreading "German imperialism".

== Authorship ==
After earning the position of Oslo City Council representative in 1984, Folkvord used much of his time writing books about his political experiences and beliefs. His books have earned much attention by the Norwegian media. He also collaborated on several books, the most notable being Rapport fra rottereiret – korrupsjon i Norge. In the book Folkvord claimed that Lise Harlem was involved in some sort of corruption in Norway, although to verify this he had only one source, Knut Frigaard. Harlem later wrote an article in Aftenposten stating that the book was "dubiously" written and unreliable. The book also received support from Carl August Fleischer and Liberal Party politician Helge Seip who defended the book against the accusations. Folkvord wrote Rødt! in 1998, a book about his tenure as a parliamentary representative. Twelve pages were about Folkvords four-year-term as representative, the other pages contained information criticising fellow parliamentary representatives. When writing the book, he wanted it to have some sort of impact on Red Youth members and other left of center groups or activists. Operasjon Heilomvending, published in 2007, contained a large amount of criticism of the Socialist Left Party, the Labour Party and the Red-Green Coalition in general. The book Vår korrupte hovedstad (Our Corrupt Capital), was published in 2011. In 2015, his book Det store Oslo-ranet (The Great Oslo Robbery) was published. His book Rojava! Kurderne i kamp for ei framtid uten Assad, Erdoğan og Daesh (Rojava! Kurds in struggle for a future without Assad, Erdoğan, and Daesh) was published in 2016.

== Personal life ==
Folkvord was a brother of journalist and non-fiction writer Magnhild Folkvord.

He had a daughter named Jorunn Folkvord who works as a teacher and is a member of the Norwegian teachers union, Union of Education Norway. She was notable for her far-left political activities in Norway, having membership status in the Workers' Communist Party and the Red Electoral Alliance. She took part in several notable protests during the 1990s, in one case being arrested by the police. She was also the Leader of Red Youth during the early 1990s. She has also served on the Oslo City Council.

Folkvord died in Stockholm on 1 March 2024, at the age of 74. He had traveled to Stockholm in connection with a book project about Kurdistan and Palestine.
