= Gunnar Lund =

Swedish diplomat and politician (born 1947)

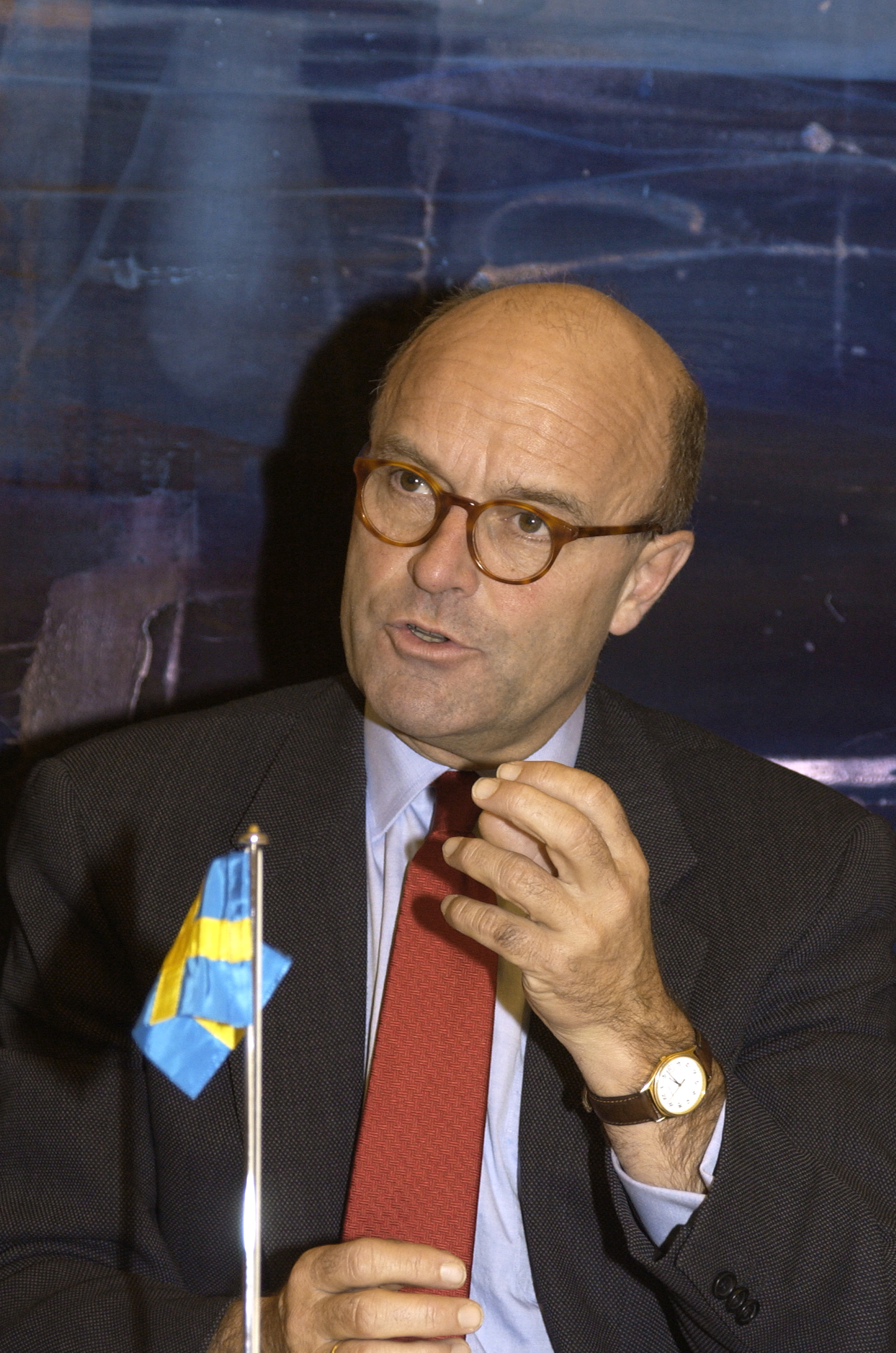
- Lund in Oslo in October 2003

Ambassador of Sweden to France
- In office 2007–2014
- Preceded by: Frank Belfrage
- Succeeded by: Veronika Wand-Danielsson

Ambassador of Sweden to the United States
- In office 2005–2007
- Preceded by: Jan Eliasson
- Succeeded by: Jonas Hafström

Minister for International Monetary Exchange
- In office 21 October 2002 – 2004

Permanent Representative of Sweden to the European Union
- In office 1999–2002
- Preceded by: Frank Belfrage
- Succeeded by: Sven-Olof Petersson

Personal details
- Born: Nils Gunnar Wiggo Lund; 23 July 1947 (age 79) Karlskoga, Sweden
- Party: Social Democratic Party
- Spouse: Kari Lotsberg (m. 1980)
- Children: 3
- Education: Stockholm University, Uppsala University, Columbia University

Nils Gunnar Wiggo Lund (born 26 July 1947) is a Swedish diplomat and politician.

== Early life ==
Lund was born on 26 July 1947 in Karlskoga, Sweden, the son of Wiggo Lund, a lawyer, and his wife Brita (née Wahlqvist), a librarian. Lund did his military service as an interpreter in Uppsala and was educated in Russian. He graduated from Stockholm University and Uppsala University with a bachelor's degree in political economics, political science and Russian in 1971. Lund received a master's degree in political economics and international law from Columbia University in 1972.

== Career ==
Lund worked at the Ministry for Foreign Affairs from 1972 to 1976 and as a desk officer (departementssekreterare) at the Ministry of Finance from 1976 to 1977, and at the Ministry of Commerce and Industry from 1977 to 1980. He was financial advisor in the Swedish delegation at the OECD from 1980 to 1983, director (departementsråd) at the Ministry of Finance from 1983 to 1988, state secretary at the Ministry of Finance from 1988 to 1991, and ambassador at the Ministry for Foreign Affairs in 1994. Lund worked at the National Swedish War Materials Inspectorate in 1994 and was state secretary at the Ministry for Foreign Affairs from 1994. Lund was Sweden's chief negotiator at the EU's intergovernmental conference from 1996 to 1997.

Lund has served as a diplomat in Copenhagen and as the Permanent Representative of Sweden to the European Union.

From 2002 until 2004 he served as minister for International Monetary Exchange in the Swedish cabinet. From 1 September 2005 until 2007 he was the Swedish Ambassador to the United States and from the fall of 2007 he served as the Swedish ambassador to France.

== Personal life ==
In 1980, Lund married state secretary Kari Lotsberg (born 1950), the daughter of civil engineer Oddleiv Lotsberg and Helene (née Svane). They have three children: Gustav (born 1984) Harald (born 1987), and Ingrid (born 1990).

== Awards and decorations ==
- Grand Decoration of Honour in Silver with Sash for Services to the Republic of Austria (1997)

Diplomatic posts
Preceded by Frank Belfrage	Permanent Representative of Sweden to the European Union; 1999–2002	Succeeded by Sven-Olof Petersson
Preceded by Jan Eliasson	Ambassador of Sweden to the United States; 2005–2007	Succeeded by Jonas Hafström
Preceded by Frank Belfrage	Ambassador of Sweden to France; 2007–2014	Succeeded by Veronika Wand-Danielsson
Preceded by None	Ambassador of Sweden to Monaco; 2009–2014	Succeeded by Veronika Wand-Danielsson
