= Fulltofta Church =

- Fulltofta kyrka
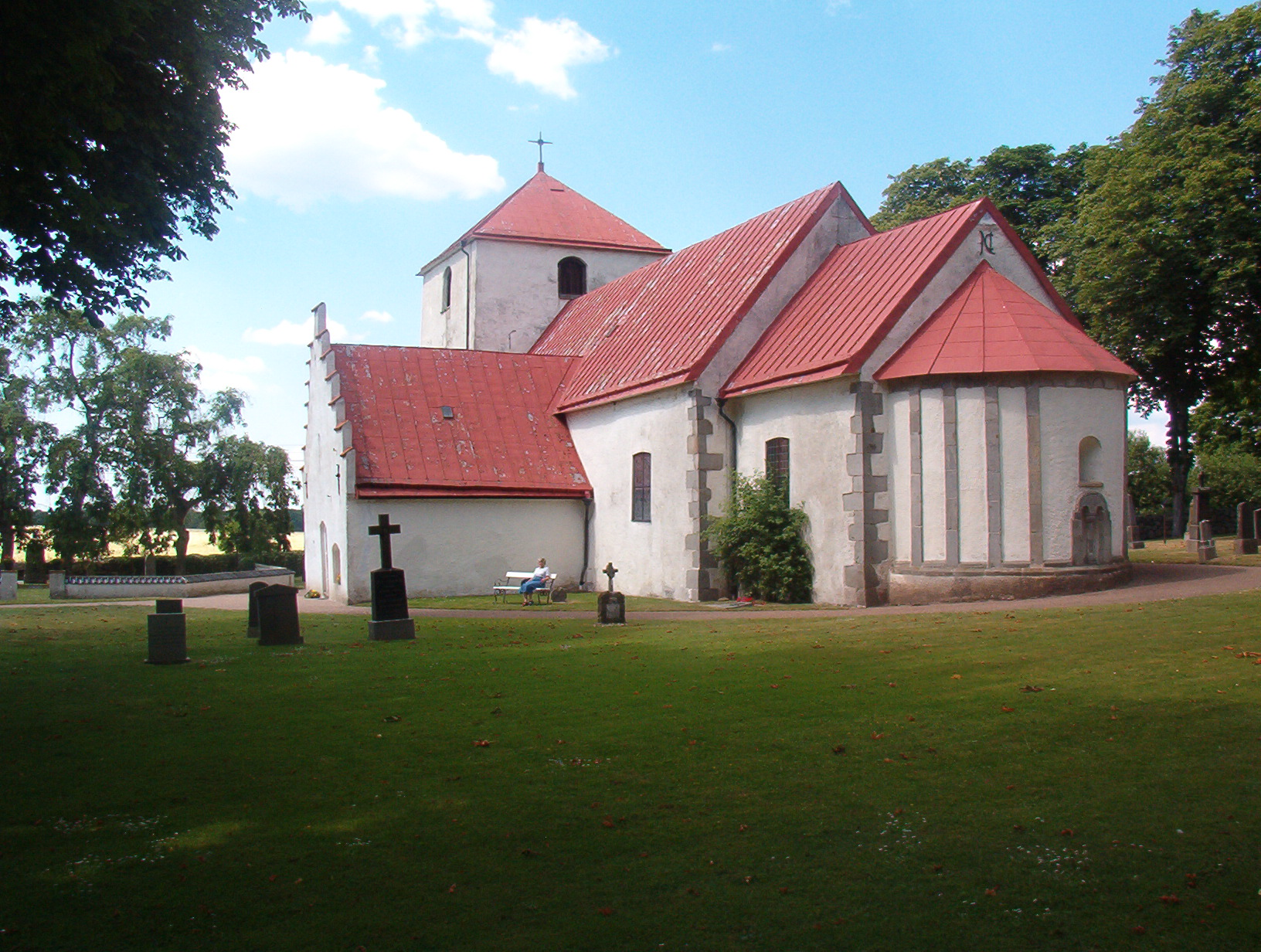
- Fulltofta Church

- 55°52′38″N 13°37′07″E
- Country: Sweden
- Denomination: Church of Sweden

Administration
- Diocese: Lund

Fulltofta Church (Swedish: Fulltofta kyrka) is a medieval church in Fulltofta, in Hörby Municipality in the province of Skåne, Sweden. It belongs to the Diocese of Lund. During the Middle Ages, the church was a local pilgrimage site for the veneration of Magnhild of Fulltofta. It contains many medieval murals, uncovered during a restoration of the church in the early 20th century.

== History ==
Fulltofta Church was built approximately 1160–1175, possibly by the same workshop responsible for building the nearby church of Bosjökloster, as indicated by the similarities between the unusual apses of the churches. These are decorated with sandstone lesenes. Fulltofta Church also has cornerstones of the same material, and still intact are the portals of the southern entrance and fragments of the northern portal. The main building material of the church is otherwise fieldstone. The tower is somewhat later, built during the 13th century and originally taller than it is at present. The church porch decorated with crow-stepped gables in front of the southern entrance was added during the course of the 14th century.

Inside, the vaulted ceiling of the church was constructed during the 15th century, replacing an earlier ceiling. In the 17th century, a burial chapel was built for the family owning the nearby estate Fulltofta gård. The tower was enlarged in 1809; the work was financed by the owner of Trollenäs Castle, Arwid Trolle. A major restoration of the church was carried out in 1953.

The church was built next to Fulltofta gård, an estate which at the time belonged to the Bishop of Lund. During the Middle Ages, the place became a pilgrimage site for the locally venerated Saint Magnhild of Fulltofta. According to legend, Magnhild was a pious woman who was shot to death with an arrow from a bow by an assassin hired by her daughter-in-law in 1215. Her body was buried in or near Fulltofta Church, which became a local pilgrimage site until the saint's body was moved to Lund Cathedral in a solemn procession in 1383. Close to the church, a small spring named after the saint is supposed to have appeared at the place where the casket containing her body touched the ground, according to the legend.

== Interior ==
=== Murals ===
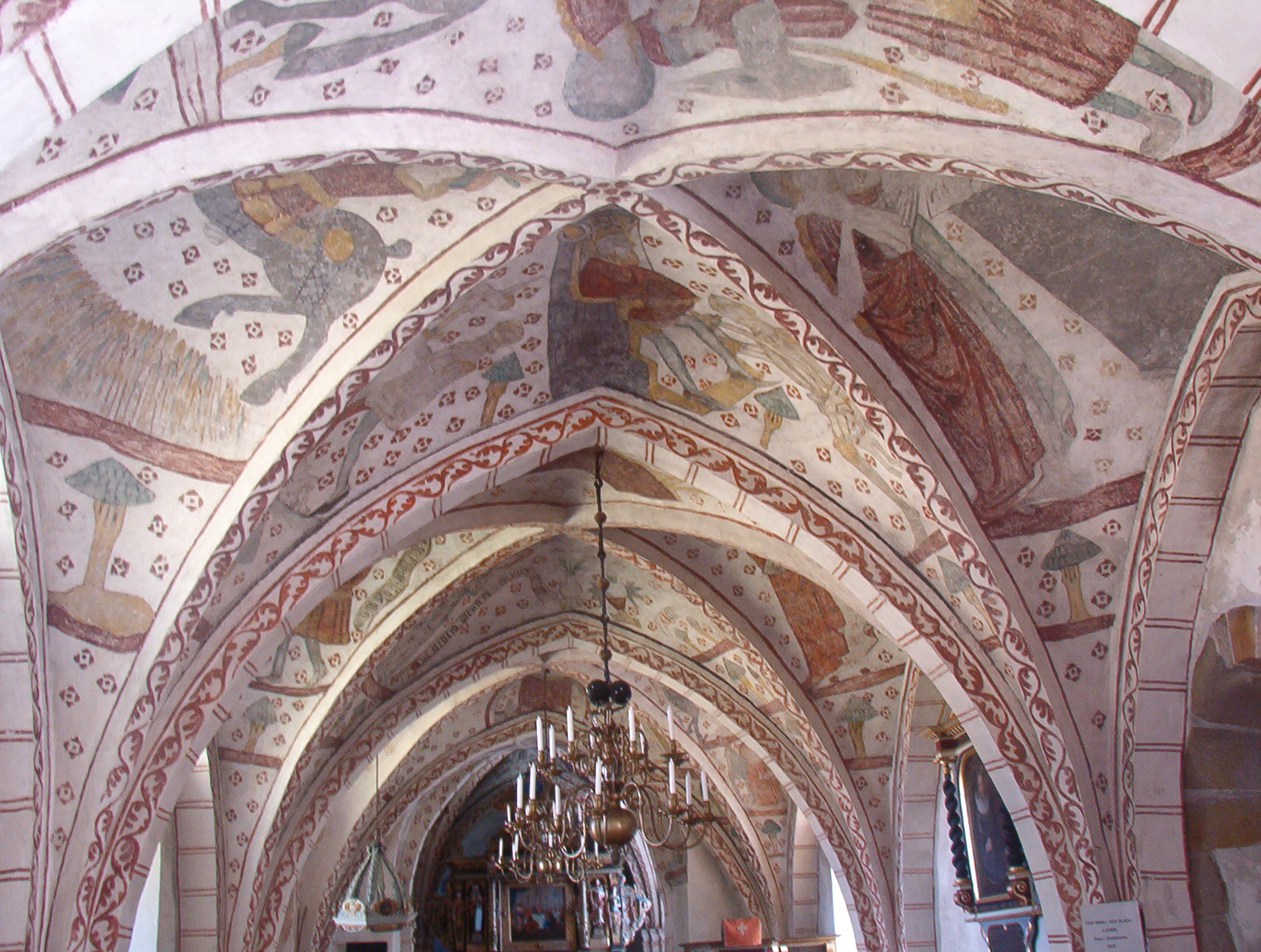
Interior view of the profusely decorated vaults

The interior of the church is richly decorated with medieval murals, dating from the second half of the 15th century. They are considered to be made by an artist known by the notname Skivarpsmästaren, after the murals in Skivarp Church which are believed to be by the same hand. They were rediscovered in 1907 after having been covered with whitewash since the Reformation, and uncovered in 1910–1912. The paintings have been described as being of high quality and depict almost exclusively scenes from the Bible (and with the exception only of other religious themes, e.g. the stigmatization of Saint Francis).

=== Furnishings ===
The oldest item in the church is the square-shaped baptismal font, of the same age as the church building. Of the church bells, the smaller one is medieval; it was made in the 15th century by a bell-maker named Jakob Jode or Yade in Stralsund. The other furnishings date from the time after the Reformation. The altarpiece is from 1636, probably made in the workshop of Jacob Kremberg in Lund. The pulpit is from the late 16th century. A stained glass window of the church, made in 1936 by artist Hugo Gelin, recounts the legend of Saint Magnhild.
