= Arvid Taube =

Swedish aristocrat, diplomat and politician (1853–1916)

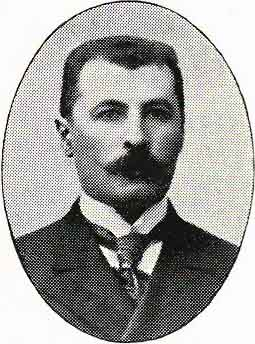

Minister of Foreign Affairs
- In office 1909–1911
- Prime Minister: Arvid Lindman
- Preceded by: Eric Trolle
- Succeeded by: Albert Ehrensvärd the Younger

Personal details
- Born: Arvid Fredrik Taube; 19 January 1853
- Died: 14 October 1916 (aged 63) Alingsås, Älvsborg County, Sweden

Arvid Fredrik Taube (19 January 1853 – 14 October 1916) was a Swedish aristocrat who served as the foreign minister between 1909 and 1911 and also, held various diplomatic posts.

== Biography ==
Taube was born on 19 January 1853. He served as the head of the political department of the foreign ministry from 1892 to 1895. His next post was the secretary to the cabinet between 1895 and 1900.

He was the foreign minister for two years in the period of 1909–1911 in the cabinet of Prime Minister Arvid Lindman. Taube replaced Eric Trolle in the post. Taube's successor was Albert Ehrensvärd the Younger. Before and after his post as foreign minister Taube was the ambassador of Sweden to Germany.

Taube had a conservative political stance. He was a supporter Germany, and when he was in office as foreign minister he proposed to establish a close alliance between Sweden and Germany against the Russian Empire in the case of war. Taube also redesigned the foreign policy of Sweden due to the likelihood of war.

Taube died in Alingsås on 14 October 1916. He was buried there on 19 October.

== See also ==
- Taube family
