= Klågerup Castle =

Building in Svedala Municipality, Skåne County, Sweden

- Klågerup slott
- Svedala Municipality
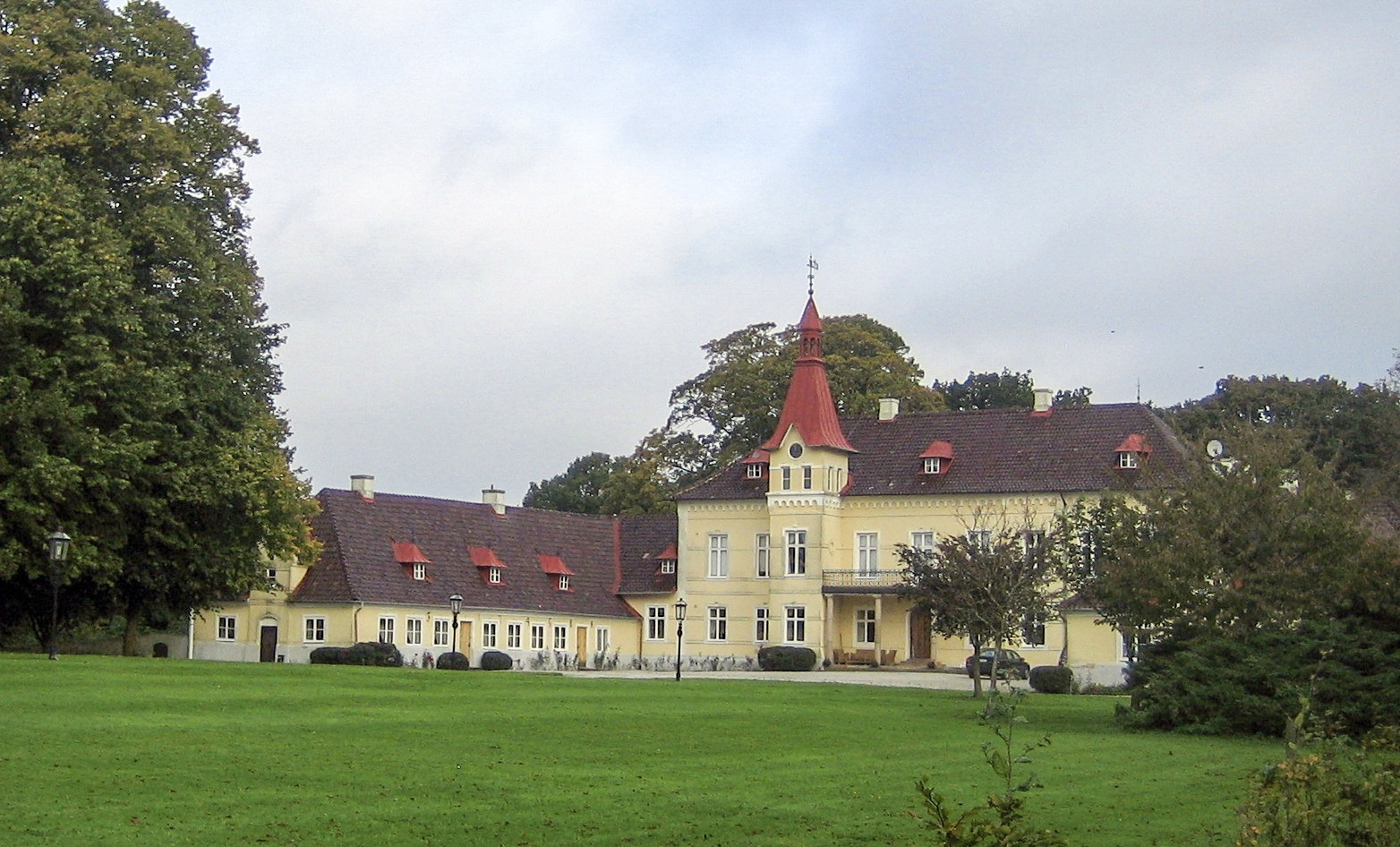
- Klågerup Castle

Site information
- Type: Castle
- Open to the public: No

Location
- Scania, Sweden
- Coordinates: 55.5997°N 13.2676°E

Site history
- Built: 1737-61

Klågerup Castle (Swedish: Klågerup slott) is a mansion at Svedala Municipality in Scania, Sweden.

== History ==
Klågerup was owned in the early 15th century by Peter Spoldener. However, by the 18th century the building was in bad shape and by 1737 extensive restorations were commissioned by Fredrik Trolle. The current main building was constructed by Carl Axel Trolle under design by architect Helgo Zettervall (1831-1907) in French Renaissance style.

== See also ==
- List of castles in Sweden
