= Ankertorget =

Market square located in Oslo, Norway

Coordinates: 59°55′2″N 10°45′24″E

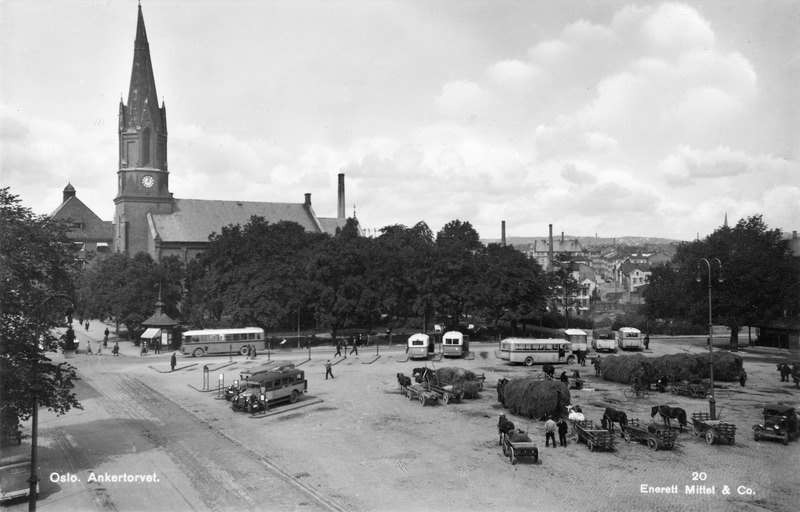
Ankertorvet in the 1930s

Ankertorget was a market square located in the city centre of Oslo, Norway. The property site lies between Torggata, Storgata, Hausmannsgate and the Akerselva.

Ankertorget was developed between 1880–1882 and named after 18th century merchant, timber trader, and shipowner Christian Anker (1711–1765). For many years there were storage tanks on the property, which secured gas supply to many homes in the area. From the 1920s until the early 1970s, the site had a terminal for bus routes to Oslo's southern and eastern surrounds. In the 1970s the market became a construction site. At that same time, office and retail space were developed along Storgata and Hausmannsgate. Ankertorget was re-developed with Anker studentbolig which provides housing for vocational school students. On site, there is also Anker Hostel and Anker Hotel .
