= Karl Gustaf von Brinkman =

Swedish and German classicist poet, writer and diplomat

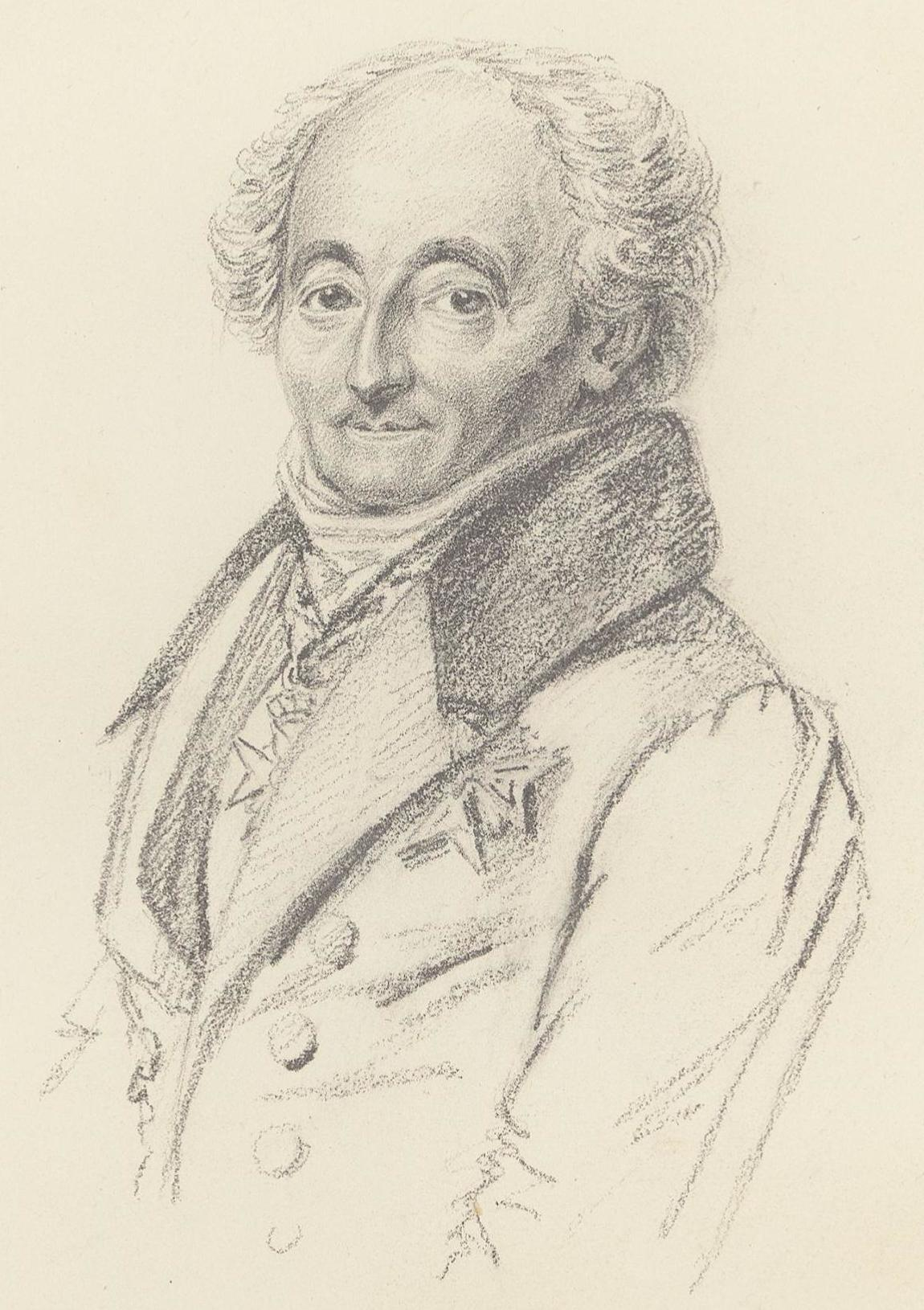
Karl Gustaf von Brinkman in 1835.

Karl Gustaf von Brinkman (25 February 1764 – 25 December 1847) was a Swedish and German classicist poet, writer and diplomat. Member of the Swedish Academy 1828–1847, Seat No. 3, ennobled and elevated to Baron, chamberlain.

Karl Gustaf von Brinkman was born in Nacka, Sweden, and was the son of Secretary Hans Gustaf von Brinkman and Countess Beata Kristina Leijon Manor. His education was from the beginning of strictly religious orientation, as his father intended him for a missionary work. From 1782 to 1785, he attended the Seminar of the Moravian Church in Barby, Germany. He became acquainted with Friedrich Schleiermacher, who devoted his later writings on religion. In 1787, he began to study at the University of Halle, and studied philosophy and law. In 1889, he went on an educational journey that led him to Wittenberg, Jena, Weimar, Leipzig and Berlin. Through his activities in 1791 in government service, he received the confidence of King Gustav III of Sweden. He then became Secretary of Legation in Berlin in 1792 and began his diplomatic career. In Berlin, he moved in the romantic salons, met William and Alexander von Humboldt, and was assistant at Friedrich Schiller's Musen-Almanach.

From 1798 until 1801 he was involved in diplomatic affairs in Paris and at this time frequented the house of Anne Louise Germaine de Staël. As ambassador in Berlin (1807), he made among other things the acquaintance of Johannes von Müller, Johann Gottlieb Fichte, Friedrich von Gentz, Adam Müller, with whom he had constant exchange of ideas. He accompanied the royal family on their flight to East Prussia. From 1808 until 1810 he was ambassador in London and became a deputy chancellor in Stockholm.

His diplomatic career changed abruptly when he lost the confidence of the royal court. In 1835 focused only on literature, which he published in Swedish. His extensive correspondence, which he greatly enjoyed, shows him as a witty interlocutor. In 1836, he was elected a member of the Royal Swedish Academy of Sciences. Von Brinkman died in 1847 in Stockholm.

== Sources ==
- E. F. Foßmann (1903). "Brinckmann, Karl Gustav von". Allgemeine Deutsche Biographie (in German). Vol. 47. Leipzig: Duncker & Humblot. pp. 236–238.
- Richard Newald (1955). "Brinckmann, Karl Gustav Freiherr von". Neue Deutsche Biographie (in German). Vol. 2. Berlin: Duncker & Humblot. pp. 615–616.
- Richard Steffen: Kvinnorna kring Tegnér, Kooperativa Förbundets bokförlag, Stockholm 1947. OCLC 492320313
- Nordisk familjebok (1905), vol. 4, pp. 160–163
- Svenskt biografiskt handlexikon I, Stockholm 1906

Cultural offices
| Preceded by Johann Adam Tingstadius | Swedish Academy, Seat No. 3; 1828–1847 | Succeeded by Albrecht Elof Ihre |
