= Magnhild Folkvord =

Norwegian journalist and writer

- Born: 27 November 1945 (age 80)
- Occupations: Journalist and biographer
- Known for: Biographies on Fredrikke Marie Qvam, Betzy Kjelsberg and Magnhild Haalke

Magnhild Folkvord (born 27 November 1945) is a Norwegian journalist and biographer.

== Background ==
Folkvord is from Frol Municipality and is an older sister of Erling Folkvord. She moved to Oslo to take a cand.mag. degree at the University of Oslo, but as a member of the Workers' Communist Party she dropped out of the master's studies to self-proletarize.

== Work ==
Folkvord was an ironworker at Jøtul for fourteen years.

After resigning she eventually became a journalist in the former Workers' Communist Party newspaper Klassekampen in 1999. She worked there until 2015 and wrote political books. She also wrote a biography on Fredrikke Marie Qvam in 2013, leading to her resigning from the newspaper and writing more biographies, on Betzy Kjelsberg in 2015 and Magnhild Haalke in 2019.
