= Linköping Castle =

Castle in Östergötland, Sweden

Coordinates: 58°24′38″N 15°36′57″E

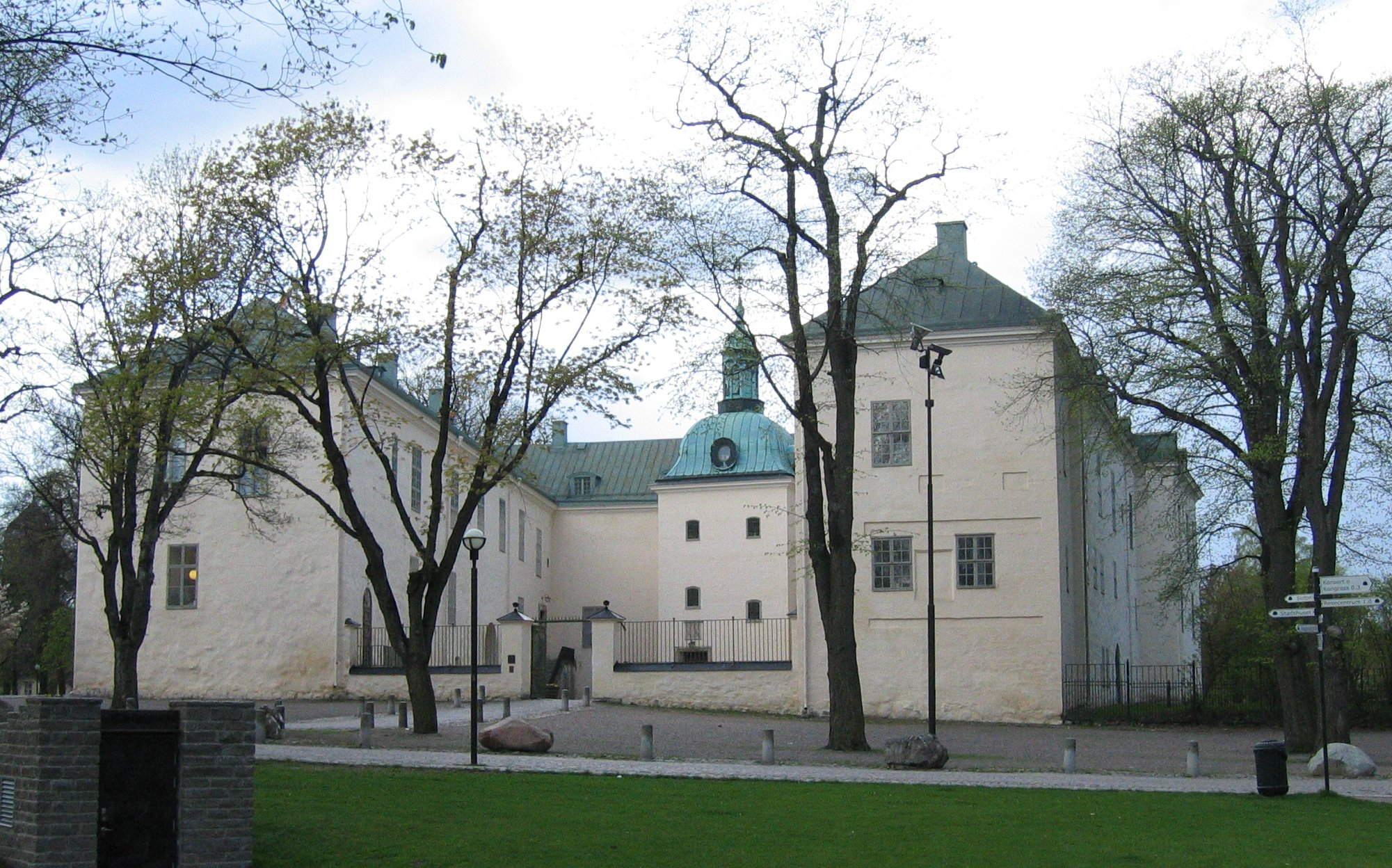
Linköping Castle

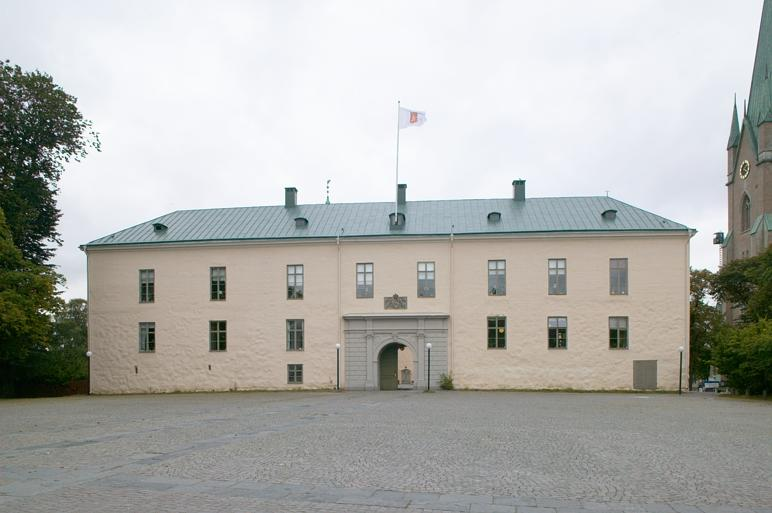
Linköping Castle

Linköping Castle is situated at Linköping in Östergötland, Sweden. It stands opposite Linköping Cathedral (Linköpings Domkyrka).

== History ==
Bishop Gisle of the Diocese of Linköping first built a bishop's farm with a limestone castle in 1149. After King Gustav Vasa carried out the Reformation in 1527, the estate was converted into a royal castle. In the 1570s, King John III of Sweden (1537–1592) had the castle re-designed by Dutch architect Arendt de Roy with a new three-storey wing along the southern ring wall, he also built on the western nave with one floor. The whole castle was then white with red borders around doors and some windows. Under King Charles IX of Sweden (1550–1611), the castle was rebuilt into Renaissance style at the end of the 16th century.

The castle has been the governor's residence for Östergötland County since 1785 and a state building monument since 1935. In 2000, Linköping Castle and Cathedral Museum (Linköpings Slotts & Domkyrkomuseum) was inaugurated on three floors in the castle's north wing.

== Other sources ==
- Juvander, Katarina; Billeson, Göran (2006) Linköpings slott: en 900-årig historia (Stockholm: Statens fastighetsverk) ISBN 91-86670-27-1
