= Magnhild of Fulltofta =

Danish Saint

Magnhild of Fulltofta (died before 1228), is a Danish Roman Catholic local saint. She is one of the three female saints of Scania alongside Sissela of Borrby and Tora of Torekov, but she is the only one of them documented as an actual historical person.

Magnhild was described as a pious woman from Benarp who nursed the sick, and educated and provided for children. She was murdered by her daughter-in-law with an arrow. When her corpse was brought from Fulltofta home to Benarp, the coffin-carriers rested at Hästäng. There, a well appeared where they put down her coffin. After this, a chapel was erected by the well, and Magnhild, though never canonized by the pope, became the object of veneration.

The veneration of Magnhild is first mentioned in 1228. By then it was apparently a recent phenomenon, and she reportedly lived in the early 13th-century. In 1383, her remains were moved to Lund Cathedral.

== See also ==
- Margrethe of Roskilde
