= List of ambassadors of Sweden to Italy =

Ambassador of Sweden to Italy
- Lesser coat of arms of the Kingdom of Sweden

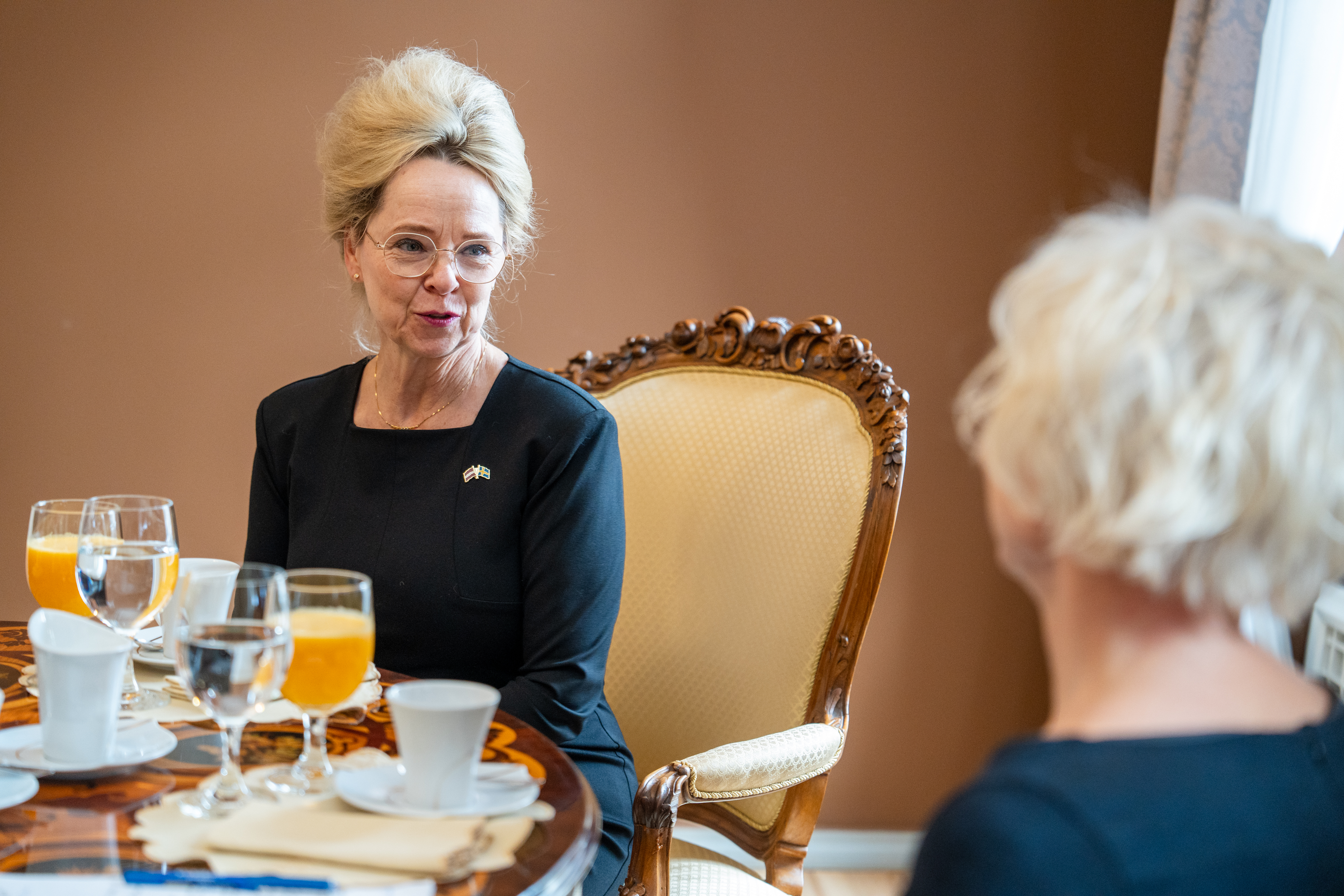
- Incumbent; Karin Höglund since 2025
- Ministry for Foreign Affairs; Swedish Embassy, Rome
- Style: His or Her Excellency (formal); Mr. or Madam Ambassador (informal)
- Reports to: Minister for Foreign Affairs
- Residence: Via di Villa Patrizi 5
- Seat: Rome, Italy
- Appointer: Government of Sweden
- Term length: No fixed term
- Inaugural holder: Geronimo Marchelli
- Formation: 1766
- Website: Swedish Embassy, Rome

The Ambassador of Sweden to Italy (known formally as the Ambassador of the Kingdom of Sweden to the Italian Republic) is the official representative of the government of Sweden to the president of Italy and government of Italy.

== History ==
In March 1956, an agreement was reached between the Swedish and Italian governments on the mutual elevation of the respective countries' legations to embassies. The diplomatic rank was thereafter changed to ambassador instead of envoy extraordinary and minister plenipotentiary.

== List of representatives ==
Name	Period	Title	Resident / Concurrent accreditation	Notes	Presented credentials	Ref
Kingdom of Sardinia (1297–1861)
Geronimo Marchelli	1766–1788	Chargé d'affaires		Genoa		
Georg Gustaf Wrangel	7 April 1789 – 1793	Envoy extraordinary and minister plenipotentiary				
Francesco Piranesi	1790–1794	Resident		Rome		
Gustaf Mauritz Armfelt	7 September 1792 – 1794	Minister				
Johan Claes Lagersvärd	1792–?	Chargé d'affaires				
Francesco Piranesi	1794–1798	Minister				
Gustaf von Düben	1802–?	Chargé d'affaires		At the Imperial Roman Court.		
Gotthard Wilhelm von Budberg	1812–1812	Chargé d'affaires		In Naples but was immediately recalled due to the outbreak of war.		
Johan Claes Lagersvärd	1815/16–1834	Resident minister				
Johan Wilhelm Bergman	1841–1852	Chargé d'affaires				
Carl Wachtmeister	25 September 1850 – 1858	Chargé d'affaires and consul general ad interim				
Carl Edward Vilhelm Piper	22 June 1859 – 1861	Chargé d'affaires		In Turin.		
Kingdom of Italy (1861–1946)
Carl Fredrik Hochschild	20 July 1861 – 1863	Chargé d'affaires		In Turin. Also acting consul general in Italy on 18 October 1861.		
Carl Fredrik Hochschild	27 March 1863 – 1865	Resident minister		Also consul general from the same date.		
Carl Edward Vilhelm Piper	6 October 1865 – 1872	Envoy		In Rome. Also acting consul general there in 1865.		
Hans Henrik von Essen	12 June 1873 – 1877	Envoy		Acting consul general in Italy on 26 September 1873.		
Frans Theodor Lindstrand	6 August 1877 – 21 June 1889	Envoy		Acting consul general in Italy on 17 August 1877.		
Carl Bildt	10 September 1889 – 1902	Envoy				
Thor von Ditten	8 May 1903 — 9 June 1905	Envoy				
Carl Bildt	14 October 1905 – 5 March 1920	Envoy				
Evert Åkerhielm	1906–1906	Chargé d'affaires ad interim (Note: Held the diplomatic rank of acting legetion secretary.)				
Augustin Beck-Friis	5 November 1920 – 26 July 1927	Envoy		Died in office		
Erik Sjöborg	1928–1937	Envoy				
Einar af Wirsén	1937–1940	Envoy				
Hans Beck-Friis	1940–1942	Envoy				
Joen Lagerberg	14 September 1942 – 1946	Envoy				
Italian Republic (1946–present)
Christian Günther	28 June 1946 – 21 April 1950	Envoy				
Johan Beck-Friis	1950–1956	Envoy				
Johan Beck-Friis	2 March 1956 – 1956	Ambassador				
Eric von Post	1956–1965	Ambassador				
Brynolf Eng	1966–1973	Ambassador	Also accredited to Malta			
Dick Hichens-Bergström	1973–1979	Ambassador	Also accredited to Malta			
Axel Lewenhaupt	1979–1983	Ambassador	Also accredited to Malta			
Eric Virgin	1983–1986	Ambassador	Also accredited to Malta			
Sven Fredrik Hedin	1986–1989	Ambassador				
Ola Ullsten	1989–1995	Ambassador	Also accredited to Albania (from 1992)	Political appointee (non-career diplomat)		
Torsten Örn	1996–1998	Ambassador	Also accredited to Albania.			
Göran Berg	1998–2002	Ambassador	Also accredited to Albania and Malta			
Staffan Wrigstad	2002–2006	Ambassador	Also accredited to Albania and San Marino (from 2005)			
Anders Bjurner	2006–2010	Ambassador	Also accredited to Albania (until 2008) and San Marino			
Ruth Jacoby	2010–2015	Ambassador	Also accredited to San Marino			
Robert Rydberg	2015–2020	Ambassador	Also accredited to San Marino			
Jan Björklund	1 September 2020 – 1 October 2025	Ambassador		Political appointee (non-career diplomat)	24 September 2020	
Karin Höglund	1 October 2025–present	Ambassador			25 September 2025	

== See also ==
- Italy–Sweden relations
- Embassy of Sweden, Rome
