= Wilhelm af Wetterstedt =

Swedish diplomat and translator

Baron Wilhelm af Wetterstedt
- Born: Nils Erik Wilhelm Wetterstedt; 8 November 1815; Stockholm, Sweden
- Died: 1 January 1887 (aged 71); Skövde, Sweden
- Occupation: Diplomat
- Years active: 1837–1870
- Spouse: Carolina Augusta Wilman (m. 1864)
- Relatives: Erik af Wetterstedt (grandfather); Gustaf af Wetterstedt (uncle)

Baron Nils Erik Wilhelm Wetterstedt, ennobled as af Wetterstedt (8 November 1815 – 1 January 1887) was a Swedish diplomat and translator of opera libretti. In his early career he worked in the Swedish Foreign Office and had diplomatic posts in Vienna, Berlin, the Hague and Copenhagen. In 1857 he was appointed Swedish-Norwegian resident minister to the United States. He was recalled at the outbreak of the American Civil War and then served as envoy extraordinaire and minister plenipotentiary to the Netherlands, in late 1864 he returned to North America as envoy to the United States in Washington, D.C. He ended his diplomatic career in 1870, due to his ill health, and died in Skövde in 1887.

== Early life ==
af Wetterstedt was born into the noble af Wetterstedt family in Stockholm, Sweden on 8 November 1815. He was the son of the State Herald of Sweden, Baron Niclas Joachim af Wetterstedt (1780–1855), and the stiftsjungfru (a title for unmarried noblewomen) Charlotta Amalia von Heland (1789–1866). His paternal grandfather was the county governor, Baron Erik af Wetterstedt. His paternal uncles were the Minister for Foreign Affairs and member of the Swedish Academy, Count Gustaf af Wetterstedt (1776–1837), and the adjutant general Johan Erik af Wetterstedt (1784–1863). Wilhelm became a baron at the same time as his father, upon the death of his father's elder brother Carl, on 5 October 1853.

Wilhelm had several siblings: Hilda Maria (1812–1898), Georg Adolf Arnold Steen (1803–1878), Vilhelmina Adelaide (1814–1817), Sten Gustaf Ludvig (1817–1897), Carl August Alfred (1819–1874), Adolf Robert (1821–1869), Elina Sofia Lovisa (1823–1880), Amalia Vilhelmina (1825–1903), and Lars Fredrik (1829–1830).

At the age of 18 he entered as a fanjunkare at the Life Guards Regiment (Livbeväringsregementet), but due to severe pneumonia he had to give up the military career.

Wilhelm became a student in Uppsala in 1832, where he later earned an administrative degree (kansliexamen).

== Career ==
af Wetterstedt began his career as a clerk in the Court Chancellery (hovkanslersexpeditionen). On 15 July 1837 he was appointed kammarjunkare (chamberlain of the court), and on 17 July 1840 became second secretary in the King's Cabinet for Foreign Correspondence. During this period, he also translated several opera librettos for the Royal Swedish Opera, including Norma, La fille du régiment, L'elisir d'amore, Lucie, and Les diamants de la couronne.

On 28 October 1845 he was posted as legation secretary in Vienna, and on 23 September 1847 as acting legation secretary in Berlin. He then served as legation secretary in Copenhagen from 30 December 1847, and in The Hague from 10 November 1848. On 8 May 1851 he was appointed chargé d'affaires ad interim in The Hague. In The Hague, he led the negotiations for the marriage of Crown Prince Charles, later King Charles XV.

Further postings followed: legation secretary in Copenhagen on 10 February 1852, and in Vienna on 10 November 1855. On 8 February 1856 he became chargé d'affaires ad interim in Vienna, and on 9 May that same year chargé d'affaires in Copenhagen. In November 1856 he was elevated to kammarherre (senior chamberlain).

His first major overseas posting came on 27 April 1858, when he was named resident minister to the United States. Shortly afterwards, on 15 June 1858, he also became Swedish-Norwegian consul general. On 23 November 1860 he was appointed envoy extraordinaire and minister plenipotentiary to the Dutch court, and on 2 September 1864 he assumed the same post in the United States, where he remained until 29 June 1870. In the meantime, on 3 October 1864, he was dispatched on a special mission to Mexico.

According to his obituary, in America he was described as especially well-liked and, through great energy, succeeded in recovering for Sweden several large inheritances — among them 15,000 dollars from the notorious swindler Dr. Charles W. Roback.

When the Emperor of Mexico announced his accession to the throne, the King in Council instructed af Wetterstedt, on 10 October 1864, to travel there on a corresponding mission. In a report dated 30 November 1864, he wrote that he had arrived the previous day from Havana to Veracruz. There, an imperial carriage and cavalry escort were placed at his disposal for the journey to the capital, Mexico City, which he planned to begin the next day. Because of poor road conditions, the trip was expected to take seven to eight days.

On 29 September 1870, the King in Council accepted af Wetterstedt's resignation, following his request to be relieved of duty due to overexertion.

== Personal life ==
af Wetterstedt married on 6 November 1864 in New York to Carolina Augusta Wilman (11 December 1839 in Klara Parish, Stockholm – 3 October 1909 in Skövde). The couple had no children.

After his resignation in 1870, he returned to Sweden, settling first in Stockholm and later, in his final years, in Skövde.

In his later years he published a translation of Lord Byron's Heaven and Earth (1879).

== Death ==
af Wetterstedt died of pneumonia on 1 January 1887 in Skövde. Upon his death, his baronial title passed to his younger brother, the former senior clerk in the Swedish Administration Development Agency (Statskontoret), Ludvig af Wetterstedt, and to Ludvig's eldest son, a second lieutenant in the Svea Life Guards.

The funeral took place on 6 January 1887 in Skövde, officiated by the vice-pastor of the Skövde pastorat, L. Tofft. Many of the city's officials and civil servants followed the coffin, along with resident military officers—including Colonel Carl Ericson—burghers, and others. Among the civilians was one of the “eighteen” of the Swedish Academy, Dr. Carl Kullberg. The funeral marshals were the district judge of Vadsbo Southern Judicial District, Pontus Lagerberg, and the mayor, Ernst Hedenstierna.

The city’s Good Templar lodges, carrying their banner adorned with flowers, also joined the procession, as a gesture of gratitude toward the deceased, who had shown the lodges great favor. The Good Templars' band played the customary funeral hymns at the graveside. From the church and the nearby square, a large crowd accompanied af Wetterstedt to his final resting place.

== Awards and decorations ==
- (Sweden) Commanders 1st Class of the Order of the Polar Star (3 June 1862)
- (Sweden) Knight of the Order of the Polar Star (28 April 1856)
- Grand Cross of the Order of the Netherlands Lion (1864)
- (Mexico) Grand Cross of the Order of Guadalupe (1864)
- (Norway) Commander of the Order of St. Olav (13 October 1870)
- (Denmark) Commander 1st Class of the Order of the Dannebrog (4 August 1857)
- (Denmark) Knight of the Order of the Dannebrog (24 July 1848)
- (Norway) Knight of the Order of St. Olav (3 April 1857)

== Bibliography ==
- Wetterstedt, Nils Erik Wilhelm af (1874). Några ord i Öresundska lotsfrågan af en svensk f. d. diplomat [A few words on the Öresund pilot issue by a Swedish former diplomat] (in Swedish). Stockholm: G. Carlson. SELIBR 8221964.

== Translations ==
- Gherardini, Giovanni; Castil-Blaze; Rossini, Gioachino (1843). Skatan, eller Stölden i byn Palaiseau: opera i två akter [The Magpie or The Theft in the Village of Palaiseau: opera in two acts] (in Swedish). Translated by Wetterstedt, Wilhelm af. Stockholm: Åberg. SELIBR 14743556.
- Romani, Felice; Bellini, Vincenzo (1841). Norma: Opera seria i tre akter [Norma: Opera seria in three acts] (in Swedish). Translated by Wetterstedt, Wilhelm af. Stockholm: P. A. Norstedt & Söner. SELIBR 8821603.
- Romani, Felice; Donizetti, Gaetano (1844). Anna Boleyn: opera i fyra akter [Anne Boleyn: opera in four acts] (in Swedish). Translated by Wetterstedt, Wilhelm af. Stockholm. SELIBR 3291320.
- Romani, Felice; Donizetti, Gaetano (1840). Kärleksdrycken: Komisk opera i två akter [The Elixir of Love: Comic opera in two acts] (in Swedish). Translated by Wetterstedt, Wilhelm af. Stockholm: Östergren-Hirsch. SELIBR 10030256.
- Romani, Felice; Bellini, Vincenzo (1842). Sömngångerskan: opera i tre akter [The Sleepwalker: opera in three acts] (in Swedish). Translated by Wetterstedt, Wilhelm af. Stockholm: Norstedt. SELIBR 3291323.
- Romani, Felice; Bellini, Vincenzo (1841). Den okända: tragisk opera i två akter [The foreigner: tragic opera in two acts] (in Swedish). Translated by Wetterstedt, Wilhelm af. Stockholm: Norstedt. SELIBR 3291322.
- Rossini, Gioachino; Gherardini, M. (1843). Skatan eller Stölden i byn Palaiseau: opera i två akter [The Magpie or The Theft in the Village of Palaiseau: opera in two acts] (in Swedish). Translated by Wetterstedt, Wilhelm af. ?Stockholm : Abr. Hirsch, 1843??. SELIBR m13251c3kflf2spm.
- Saint-Georges, Henri de; Donizetti, Gaetano (1845). Regementets dotter: komedi med sång i två akter [The Daughter of the Regiment: comedy with singing in two acts] (in Swedish). Translated by Wetterstedt, Wilhelm af. Stockholm: Hirsch. SELIBR 9063871.

Diplomatic posts
Preceded by Georg Sibbern	Resident Minister of Sweden to the United States; 1858–1860	Succeeded by Carl Edward Vilhelm Piper
Preceded by None	Consul General of Sweden in Washington; 1858–1860	Succeeded by Carl Edward Vilhelm Piper
Preceded by Christian Adolf Virgin	Envoy of Sweden to the Netherlands; 1860–1864	Succeeded by Carl Fredrik Palmstierna
Preceded by Carl Edward Vilhelm Piper	Envoy of Sweden to the United States; 1864–1870	Succeeded by Oluf Stenersen
Preceded by Carl Edward Vilhelm Piper	Consul General of Sweden in Washington; 1864–1870	Succeeded by Oluf Stenersen
