= Carl Lewenhaupt =

Swedish diplomat and politician

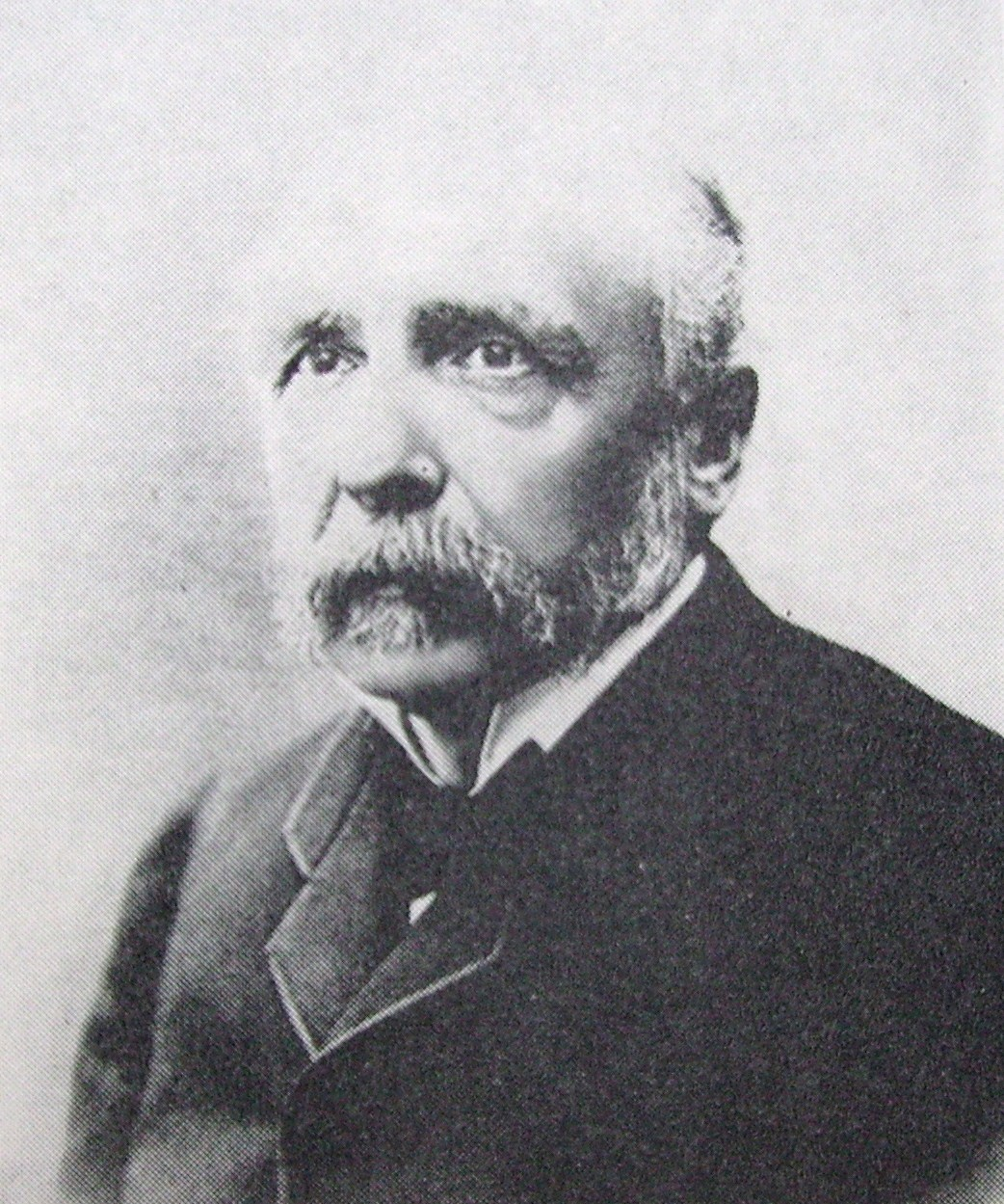

Minister for Foreign Affairs
- In office 1889–1895

Personal details
- Born: 19 March 1835; Herrevad Abbey
- Died: 10 December 1906; Helsingborg

Count Carl Lewenhaupt (19 March 1835 – 10 December 1906) was a Swedish diplomat and politician, who was Minister for Foreign Affairs from 1889 to 1895.

== Early life ==
Lewenhaupt was born on 19 March 1835 at Herrevad Abbey in Klippan Municipality, Sweden, the son of major, count Gustaf Adolf Lewenhaupt and his wife Maria (née von Geijer). He passed studentexamen in Lund in 1851 and devoted himself after passing kansliexamen in 1855 to the diplomatic service.

== Career ==
Lewenhaupt became attaché in Paris in 1858 after first been serving as temporary office clerk at the Ministry for Civil Service Affairs in 1856 and as valet de chambre in 1857. He was acting second secretary at the Ministry for Foreign Affairs in 1859 and permanent in 1861. Lewenhaupt became legation secretary in Saint Petersburg in 1863 and was appointed chamberlain the same year. In 1866 Lewenhaupt was appointed head of the Ministry for Foreign Affairs' political department and in 1870 of its trade and consular department. Lewenhaupt was appointed State Secretary for Foreign Affairs in 1873.

In his position as envoy 1876-84 and acting consul general in Washington, D.C., he was accepted by the Spanish and United States governments as arbitrator in the dispute that arose between them because of the uprising in Cuba. In 1884 Lewenhaupt was transferred as envoy to Paris, and on 12 October 1889, he was called to the Foreign Minister. During this critical time, because of the tense Union international relations, Lewenhaupt proved keenly interested in coming to both countries reasonable settlement of the Union national contentious issues and on his initiative the Swedish government commented on 14 January 1893 for the wish, that the Foreign Minister also could under certain conditions be Norwegian. This in its time very controversial »Swedish offer» aroused much discontent among the Swedes, who kept the maintenance of Sweden's preferential rights in the Union, and received from that quarter on 1 June 1895 the notification that Lewenhaupt, as Foreign Minister, had been succeeded by Count Ludvig Douglas with great satisfaction. Lewenhaupt was in late 1895 appointed Swedish Envoy and Minister in London, where he served until October 1902. He took part in the ceremonial surrounding the death in early 1901 of Queen Victoria and the accession and coronation of her successor King Edward VII.

== Personal life ==
In 1874 he married Chief Court Mistress Edla Lovisa Carolina Augusta Wirsén, the daughter of major, count Carl Emil Wirsén and baroness Ebba Lovisa (née De Geer af Leufsta). He was the father of Gustaf Adolf (born 1875) and Erik Axel (born 1877–1914).

== Death ==
Lewenhaupt died on 10 December 1906 in Helsingborg and was buried at Donationskyrkogården in Helsingborg.

== Awards and decorations ==
Lewenhaupt's awards:

- Knight and Commander of the Orders of His Majesty the King (1891-12-01)
- Commander Grand Cross of the Order of the Polar Star (1883-11-30)
- Grand Cross of the Order of St. Olav (1890-12-01)
- Grand Cross of the Order of the Red Eagle
- Grand Cross of the Order of the Redeemer (1895-05-09)
- Knight First Class of the Order of the Red Eagle (1890-07-29)
- Knight First Class of the Order of Saint Stanislaus (1875-08-11)
- Knight Second Class of the Order of Saint Stanislaus (1866-06-07)
- First Class of the Order of Osmanieh (1892)
- Knight of the Order of the Polar Star (1866-11-26)
- Grand Officer of the Legion of Honour (1889-10-29)
- Commander First Class of the Order of the Polar Star (1876-03-14)
- Commander of the Order of St. Olav (1881-01-21)
- Commander of the Order of Leopold (1872-12-19)
- Commander Second Class of the Order of the Dannebrog (1869-07-28)

Diplomatic posts
Preceded by Oluf Stenersen	Envoy of Sweden to the United States; 1876–1884	Succeeded by Gustaf Lennart Reuterskiöld
Preceded by Oluf Stenersen	Consul General of Sweden in Washington; 1876–1884	Succeeded by Gustaf Lennart Reuterskiöld
Preceded by Georg Sibbern	Envoy of Sweden to France; 1884–1889	Succeeded by Frederik Georg Knut Due
Preceded by Henrik Åkerman	Envoy of Sweden to the United Kingdom of Great Britain and Ireland; 1895–1902	Succeeded by Carl Bildt
Government offices
Preceded by Hans Henric von Essen	State Secretary for Foreign Affairs; 1873–1876	Succeeded by Alfred Lagerheim
Preceded by Gustaf Åkerhielm	Minister for Foreign Affairs; 1889–1895	Succeeded by Ludvig Douglas
