= Carl Bildt (1850–1931) =

Swedish diplomat and historian (1850–1931)

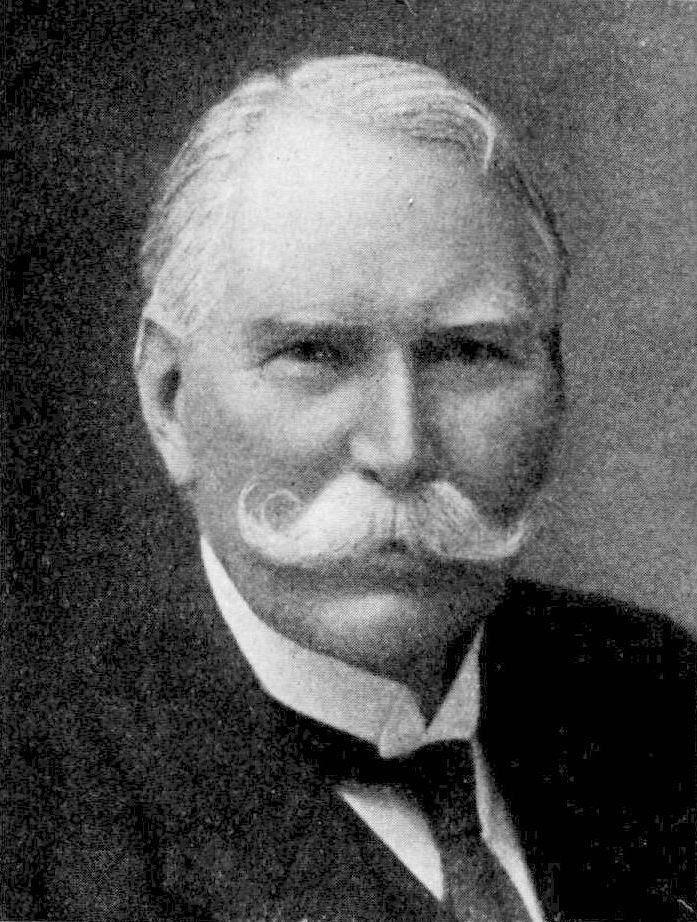
- Born: Carl Nils Daniel Bildt; 15 March 1850; Stockholm, Sweden
- Died: 26 January 1931 (aged 80); Rome, Italy
- Resting place: Protestant Cemetery
- Education: Uppsala University
- Occupations: Historian, diplomat
- Spouses: Lilian Augusta Stuart Moore (m. 1874–1887); Hedvig Alexandra Keiller (m. 1890–1931)
- Parents: Gillis Bildt (father); Lucile Rosalie Dufva (mother)

Member of the Swedish Academy (Seat No. 1)
- In office 20 June 1902 – 26 January 1931
- Preceded by: Hans Forssell
- Succeeded by: Birger Wedberg

Baron Carl Nils Daniel Bildt (15 March 1850 – 26 January 1931) was a Swedish diplomat and historian. He was Swedish envoy to the United Kingdom 1902–1905, but spent most of his Foreign Office career as Swedish envoy in Rome and published extensively on Swedish historical topics relating to Rome and Italy.

== Early life ==
A son of Gillis Bildt, he inherited the baronial title on his father's death in 1894.

== Career ==
After a law degree from Uppsala and holding various lower-ranking diplomatic posts in London, Paris, Washington D.C., Berlin and Vienna, and as state secretary for foreign affairs, he was appointed Swedish envoy to Rome in 1889. He remained there until late 1902 when he was transferred to the same position in London, and was received by King Edward VII to present his letter of credence at Buckingham Palace on 13 February 1903. During his time in London the Swedish heir Prince Gustaf Adolf married the British King′s niece Princess Margaret of Connaught in June 1905.

Bildt returned as envoy to Rome in late 1905 and remained there as envoy until his retirement in 1920. He remained in Rome after retirement, died in 1931 and was buried in the Non-Catholic Cemetery for Foreigners there.

Throughout his years in Italy, Bildt published a number of works on Italian or Italo-Swedish topics, starting with his Anteckningar från Italien av en svensk diplomat ("Notes from Italy by a Swedish diplomat"), with historical descriptions of a number of Italian towns. He wrote essays on earlier Swedish visits to Italy, such as the one by King Gustav III in 1783, but his main focus was on Saint Bridget of Sweden who spent her last years in Rome and Queen Christina, who settled there after abdicating from the Swedish throne (1654) and converting to Roman Catholicism (1655). With his excellent connections in Rome, Bildt was able to access until-then unused sources in Roman public and private archives and published articles on many previously unknown episodes in and aspects of Christina's later life.

He was elected a member of the Swedish Academy in 1901 and was a member of several foreign academies.

== Personal life ==
Bildt was married between 1 October 1874 and 15 November 1887 to Lilian Augusta Stuart Moore (17 October 1853 – 18 December 1911), the daughter of Bloomfield Haines Moore and Clara Jessup Moore of Philadelphia. On 15 September 1890 he married Hedvig Alexandra Keiller (born 30 August 1864), the daughter of Alexander Keiller.

== Awards and decorations ==
- (Sweden) Commander Grand Cross of the Order of the Polar Star (1897)
- (Sweden) Commander 1st Class of the Order of the Polar Star (1889)
- (Sweden) Knight of the Order of the Polar Star (1884)
- (United Kingdom) Honorary Knight Grand Cross of the Royal Victorian Order

== Honours ==
- Member of the Royal Swedish Academy of Letters, History and Antiquities (1900)
- Member of the Royal Society for Publication of Manuscripts on Scandinavian History (1898)
- Honorary doctor of philosophy at Uppsala University (31 May 1900)

Cultural offices
Preceded by Hans Forssell	Swedish Academy, Seat No 1; 1901–1931	Succeeded by Birger Wedberg
Diplomatic posts
Preceded by Frans Theodor Lindstrand	Envoy of Sweden to Italy; 1889–1902	Succeeded by Thor von Ditten
Preceded by Carl Lewenhaupt	Envoy of Sweden to the United Kingdom; 1902–1905	Succeeded by Herman Wrangel
Preceded by Thor von Ditten	Envoy of Sweden to Italy; 1905–1920	Succeeded by Augustin Beck-Friis
