= Carl Fredrik Hochschild =

Swedish diplomat

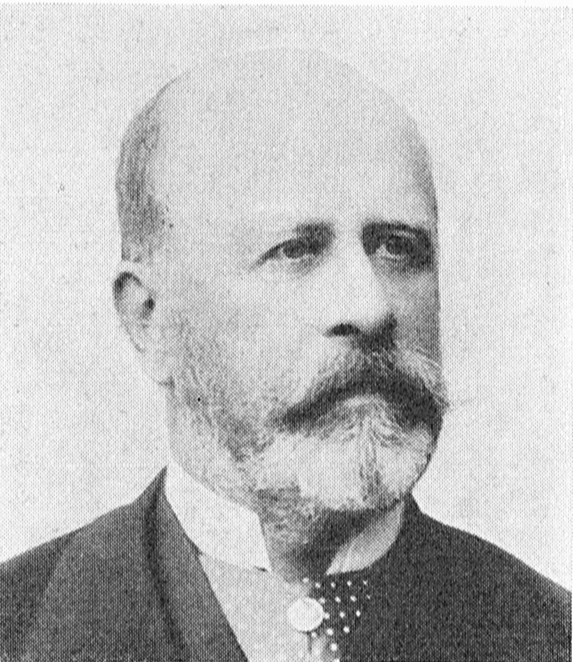

Baron Carl Fredrik Lotharius Hochschild (13 September 1831 – 12 December 1898) was a Swedish diplomat. He was the son of Carl Hochschild.

Diplomatic posts
Preceded by Carl Edward Vilhelm Piper	Chargé d'affaires of Sweden to Italy; 1861–1863	Succeeded by Himself as Resident minister
Preceded by Himself as Chargé d'affaires	Resident minister of Sweden to Italy; 1863–1864	Succeeded by Carl Edward Vilhelm Piper as Envoy
Preceded by Carl Wachtmeister	Envoy of Sweden to the United Kingdom of Great Britain and Ireland; 1866–1876	Succeeded by Carl Edward Vilhelm Piper
