= Anders Fryxell =

Swedish historian (1795–1881)

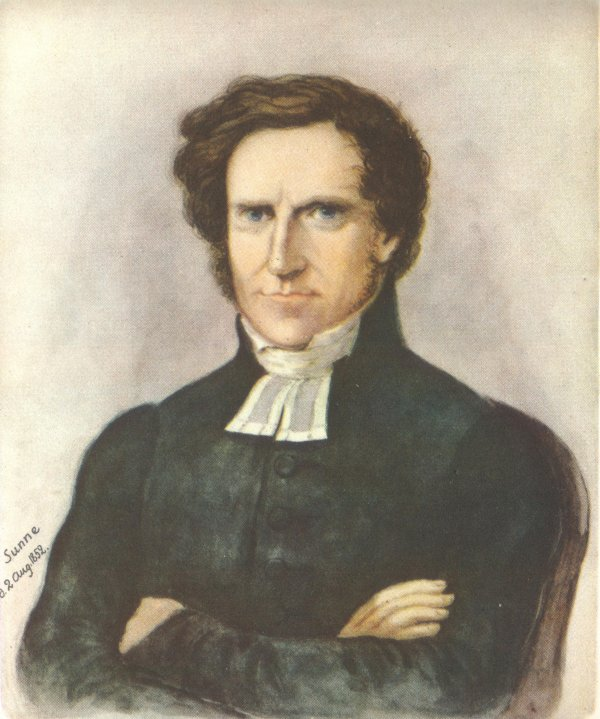
- Anders Fryxell, 1852 portrait by Alexander Wetterling
- Born: 7 February 1795 (in Julian calendar); Edsleskogs parish
- Died: 21 March 1881 (aged 86); Stockholm
- Alma mater: Uppsala University
- Occupation: Historian, priest, writer, pedagogue, Protestant theologian
- Parent(s): Mathias Fryxell
- Position held: seat 1 of the Swedish Academy (1841–1881), rector

Anders Fryxell (7 February 1795 – 21 March 1881) was a Swedish historian.

== Life ==
Fryxell was born at Edsleskog, Dalsland, (now part of Åmål Municipality, Västra Götaland County) on 7 February 1795. He was educated at Uppsala University, took holy orders in 1820, was made a Doctor of Philosophy in 1821, and in 1823 began to publish the great work of his life, the Stories from Swedish History. He did not bring this labor to a close until, fifty-six years later, he published the forty-sixth and crowning volume of his vast enterprise.

Fryxell, as a historian, appealed to every class by the picturesqueness of his style and the breadth of his research; he had the gift of awakening to an extraordinary degree the national sense in his readers. In 1824 he published his Swedish Grammar, which was long without a rival. In 1833 he received the title of professor, and in 1835 he was appointed to the incumbency of Sunne, in the diocese of Karlstad, where he resided for the remainder of his life. In 1840 he was elected to the Swedish Academy in succession to the poet Johan Olof Wallin (1779–1839). In 1847 Fryxell received from his bishop permission to withdraw from all the services of the church, that he might devote himself without interruption to historical investigation.

Among his numerous minor writings are prominent his Characteristics of Sweden between 1592 and 1600 (1830), his Origins of the Inaccuracy with which the History of Sweden in Catholic Times has been Treated (1847), and his Contributions to the Literary History of Sweden.

It is now beginning to be seen that the abundant labors of Fryxell were rather of a popular than of a scientific order, and although their influence during his lifetime was unbounded, it is only fair to later and exacter historians to admit that they threaten to become obsolete in more than one direction.

Fryxell was the founder of the progressive pioneer school Wallinska skolan, the first serious secondary education girl school in Stockholm, and was its principal in 1831–1834.

He was a member of Pro Fide et Christianismo, a Christian education society.

On 21 March 1881 Anders Fryxell died in Stockholm, and in 1884 his daughter Eva Fryxell (born 1829) published from his MS. an interesting History of My History, which was really a literary autobiography and displays the persistence and tirelessness of his industry.

He was elected a member of the Royal Swedish Academy of Sciences in 1847.

Cultural offices
Preceded by Johan Olof Wallin	Swedish Academy, Seat No 1; 1840–1881	Succeeded by Hans Forssell
