= Birger Wedberg =

Carl Otto Birger Wedberg
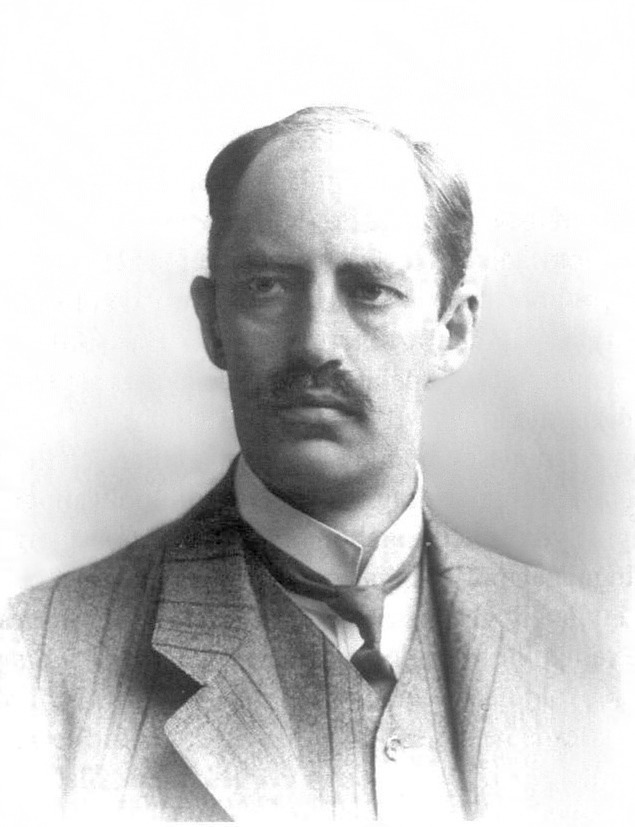
- Born: 28 September 1870; Stockholm
- Died: 2 October 1945 (aged 75)
- Occupations: Jurist, non-fiction writer
- Known for: Member of the Swedish Academy

Carl Otto Birger Wedberg (28 September 1870 - 2 October 1945) was a Swedish jurist, non-fiction writer, and member of the Swedish Academy.

== Life ==
After studying at Uppsala University and serving as a judge at the Svea Court of Appeal, he became an assessor there in 1907. He was a Justice from 1913 to 1940.

Wedberg published several writings, including Konungens högsta domstol 1789-1844 and Lidingöliv i gamla dar.

== Memberships and honors ==
Wedberg was knighted with the Order of the Polar Star in 1907. He became a member of the Royal Swedish Academy of Letters, History and Antiquities in 1929 and served as its preses from 1935 to 1945. He was elected to the Swedish Academy on 23 April 1931, taking seat number 1 after Carl Bildt, and was inducted on 20 December of the same year.
