= List of ambassadors of Sweden to the United Kingdom =

Ambassador of Sweden to the Court of St James's
- Lesser coat of arms of the Kingdom of Sweden

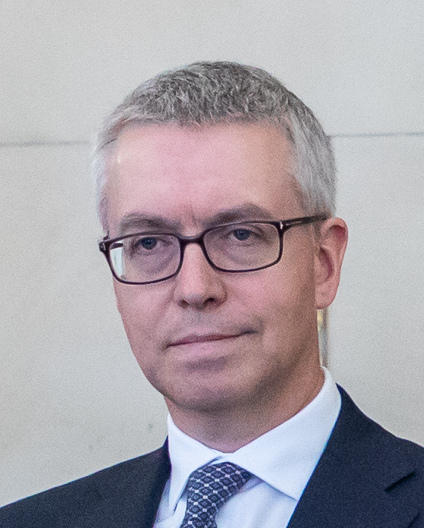
- Incumbent; Stefan Gullgren since August 2023
- Ministry for Foreign Affairs; Swedish Embassy, London
- Style: His or Her Excellency (formal); Mr. or Madam Ambassador (informal)
- Reports to: Minister for Foreign Affairs
- Residence: 27 Portland Place
- Seat: London, United Kingdom
- Appointer: Government of Sweden
- Term length: No fixed term
- Inaugural holder: Dionysius Beurræus
- Formation: 1558
- Website: Swedish Embassy, London

The Ambassador of Sweden to the United Kingdom (known formally as the Ambassador of the Kingdom of Sweden to the Court of St James's) is the official representative of the Government of Sweden to the monarch (Court of St James's) and government of the United Kingdom.

== List of representatives ==
Name	Period	Title	Notes	Presented credentials	Ref
Kingdom of England (–1707)
Dionysius Beurræus	1558–1561	Legatus perpetuus	Letter of credence dated 1 November 1557.		
Jakob Spens	1613–1620	?			
Jakob Spens	1623–1623	?			
Peter Julius Coyet	30 September 1654 – 14 June 1656	Envoy	Written instructions on 25 November 1654.		
Christer Bonde	1656–1657	?			
Johan Leijonbergh	4 May 1672 – 1674	Envoy extraordinary			
Gustaf Adolf De la Gardie	24 May 1672 – 2 November 1672	Envoy en missions speciales	To England, France and the Netherlands. (Note: Swedish mediator between France and England on the one hand and Holland on the other.)		
Johan Leijonbergh	11 May 1680 – August 1691	Envoy extraordinary	Died in office.		
Christoffer Leijoncrona	1691–1697	Acting envoy			
Nils Lillieroot	12 September 1695 – 1697	Envoy			
Christoffer Leijoncrona	6 April 1697 – 1703	Resident			
Christoffer Leijoncrona	3 November 1703 – 1707	Envoy			
Kingdom of Great Britain (1707–1800)
Christoffer Leijoncrona	1707 – 8 April 1710	Envoy	Died in office.		
Carl Gyllenborg	21 May 1710 – 17 May 1715	Resident			
Carl Gyllenborg	16 May 1715 – 1717	Envoy extraordinary			
Carl Gustaf Sparre	1719–1736	Envoy			
Carl Magnus Wasenberg	1736–1741	Chargé d'affaires			
Carl Magnus Wasenberg	1741–1743	Minister	Died in office.		
Caspar Joachim Ringwicht	1744–1748	Minister			
Edvard Carleson	28 March 1748	Envoy	Never took office. England declined to receive him as minister.		
–	1758–1763	–	Due to war conditions, the post had been vacant since 1758.		
Gustaf Adam von Nolcken	22 November 1763 – 1792?	Envoy	Dual accreditation to the Court of Hanover.		
Pehr Olof von Asp	1775–1776	Chargé d'affaires ad interim			
Lars von Engeström	21 July 1793 – 1795	Envoy			
Pehr Olof von Asp	17 July 1795 – 4 December 1798	Minister	Was officially called back on 21 December 1802.		
Göran Ulrik Silfverhielm	1795–1796	Chargé d'affaires			
Göran Ulrik Silfverhielm	1799–1800	Chargé d'affaires			
United Kingdom of Great Britain and Ireland (1801–1922)
Göran Ulrik Silfverhielm	1801–1803	Chargé d'affaires			
Gotthard Mauritz von Rehausen	1805 – 1 May 1807	Envoy extraordinary and minister plenipotentiary			
Carl Gustaf Adlerberg	10 May 1807 – 13 September 1808	Envoy			
Carl Gustaf von Brinkman	17 September 1808 – May 1810	Minister			
Gotthard Mauritz von Rehausen	1812 – ?	Envoy extraordinary and minister plenipotentiary			
Gustaf Algernon Stierneld	14 March 1818 – 1827	Envoy			
Magnus Björnstjerna	12 January 1828 – 29 December 1846	Minister			
Gotthard Mauritz von Rehausen	1847–1854	Envoy			
Christian Adolf Virgin	24 March 1854 – 8 August 1854	Acting envoy extraordinary and minister plenipotentiary			
Carl Hochschild	8 August 1854 – 1 September 1857	Envoy	Died in office.		
Baltzar von Platen	23 October 1857 – 26 August 1861	Envoy			
Carl Wachtmeister	11 October 1861 – 1865	Envoy extraordinary and minister plenipotentiary			
Carl Fredrik Hochschild	25 June 1866 – 3 October 1876	Envoy			
Carl Lewenhaupt	9 July 1869 – 9 October 1869	Chargé d'affaires ad interim			
Carl Edward Vilhelm Piper	1877–1890	Envoy			
Hans Gustaf Trolle-Wachtmeister	7 July 1883 – 5 March 1884	Chargé d'affaires			
Jakob Fredrik Adelborg	1890 – 24 March 1890	Chargé d'affaires ad interim	Died in office.		
Henrik Åkerman	1890–1895	Envoy			
Carl Lewenhaupt	12 July 1895 – 3 October 1902	Acting envoy			
Carl Bildt	3 October 1902 – 1905	Envoy		13 February 1903 to King Edward VII	
Carl Gotthard Bonde	21 August 1906 – 1 November 1906	Chargé d'affaires ad interim			
Herman Wrangel	21 February 1906 – 1920	Envoy			
Jonas Alströmer	18 December 1918 – 4 November 1919	Chargé d'affaires ad interim			
Erik Palmstierna	5 November 1920 – 1922	Envoy		13 December 1920 to King George V.	
United Kingdom of Great Britain and Northern Ireland (1922–present)
Erik Palmstierna	1922 – 26 November 1937	Envoy			
Patrik Reuterswärd	1922–1922	Chargé d'affaires ad interim			
Patrik Reuterswärd	1923–1923	Chargé d'affaires ad interim			
Patrik Reuterswärd	1924–1924	Chargé d'affaires ad interim			
Hans Beck-Friis	1938–1938	Chargé d'affaires ad interim and minister plenipotentiary			
Björn Prytz	1 June 1938 – 31 March 1947	Envoy	Appointed on 26 November 1937.		
Kurt-Allan Belfrage	1944–1945	Chargé d'affaires			
Erik Boheman	1947 – September 1947	Envoy			
Erik Boheman	September 1947 – 1948	Ambassador			
Gunnar Hägglöf	1948–1967	Ambassador			
Leif Belfrage	1967–1972	Ambassador			
Ole Jödahl	1972–1976	Ambassador			
Olof Rydbeck	16 December 1976 – June 1979	Ambassador			
Per Lind	1979 – 1 October 1982	Ambassador			
Leif Leifland	1982–1991	Ambassador			
Lennart Eckerberg	1991–1994	Ambassador			
Lars-Åke Nilsson	1994 – 5 November 1996	Ambassador	Died in office.		
Mats Bergquist	1997–2004	Ambassador			
Staffan Carlsson	2004–2010	Ambassador			
Nicola Clase	2010–2016	Ambassador		12 October 2010 to Elizabeth II.	
Torbjörn Sohlström	September 2016 – 2021	Ambassador		30 November 2016 to Elizabeth II.	
Mikaela Kumlin Granit	2021–2023	Ambassador		14 December 2021 to Elizabeth II.	
Stefan Gullgren	August 2023 – present	Ambassador		13 December 2013 to King Charles III.	

== Gallery ==
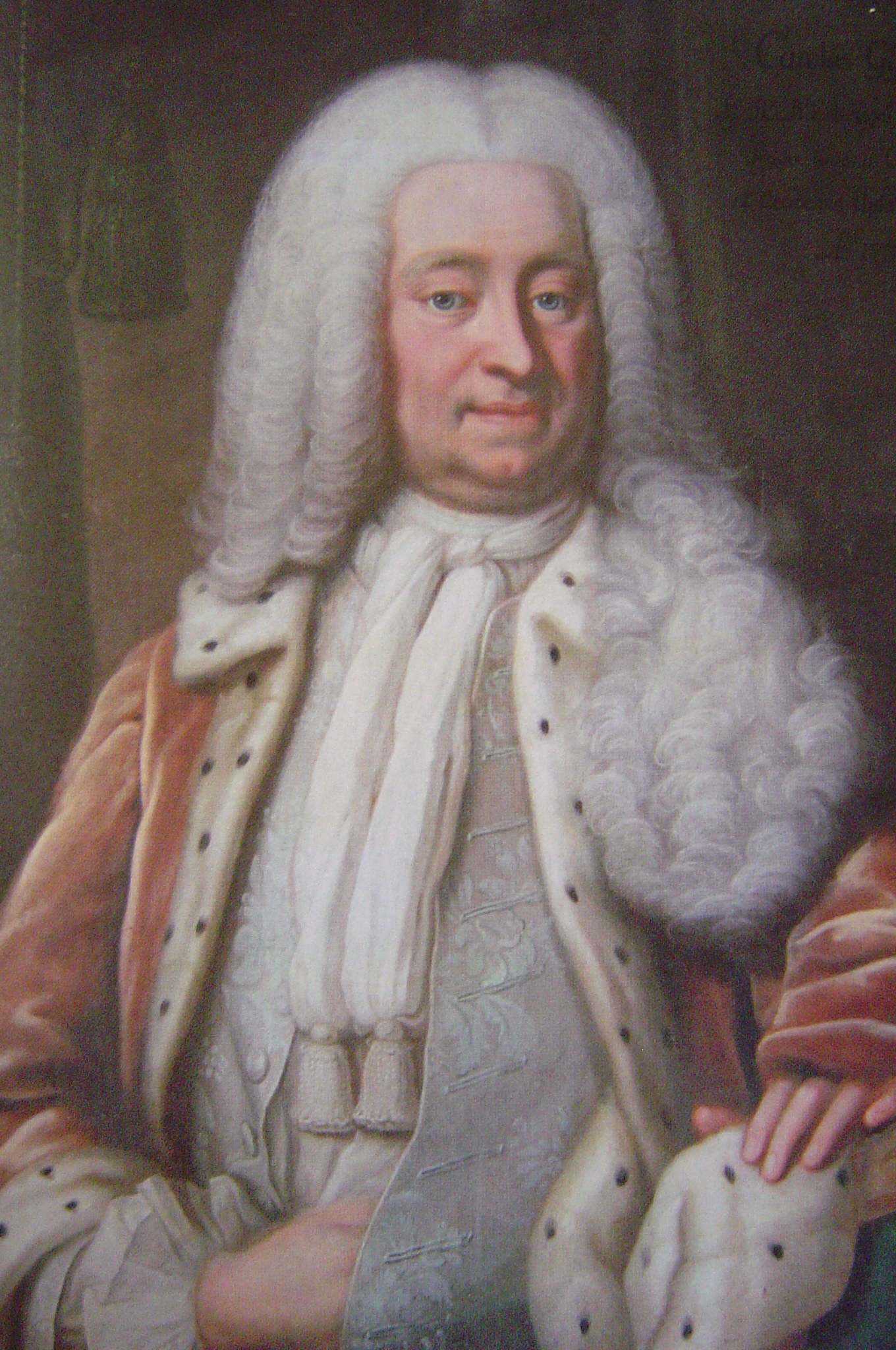
Carl Gyllenborg (1710–1717)

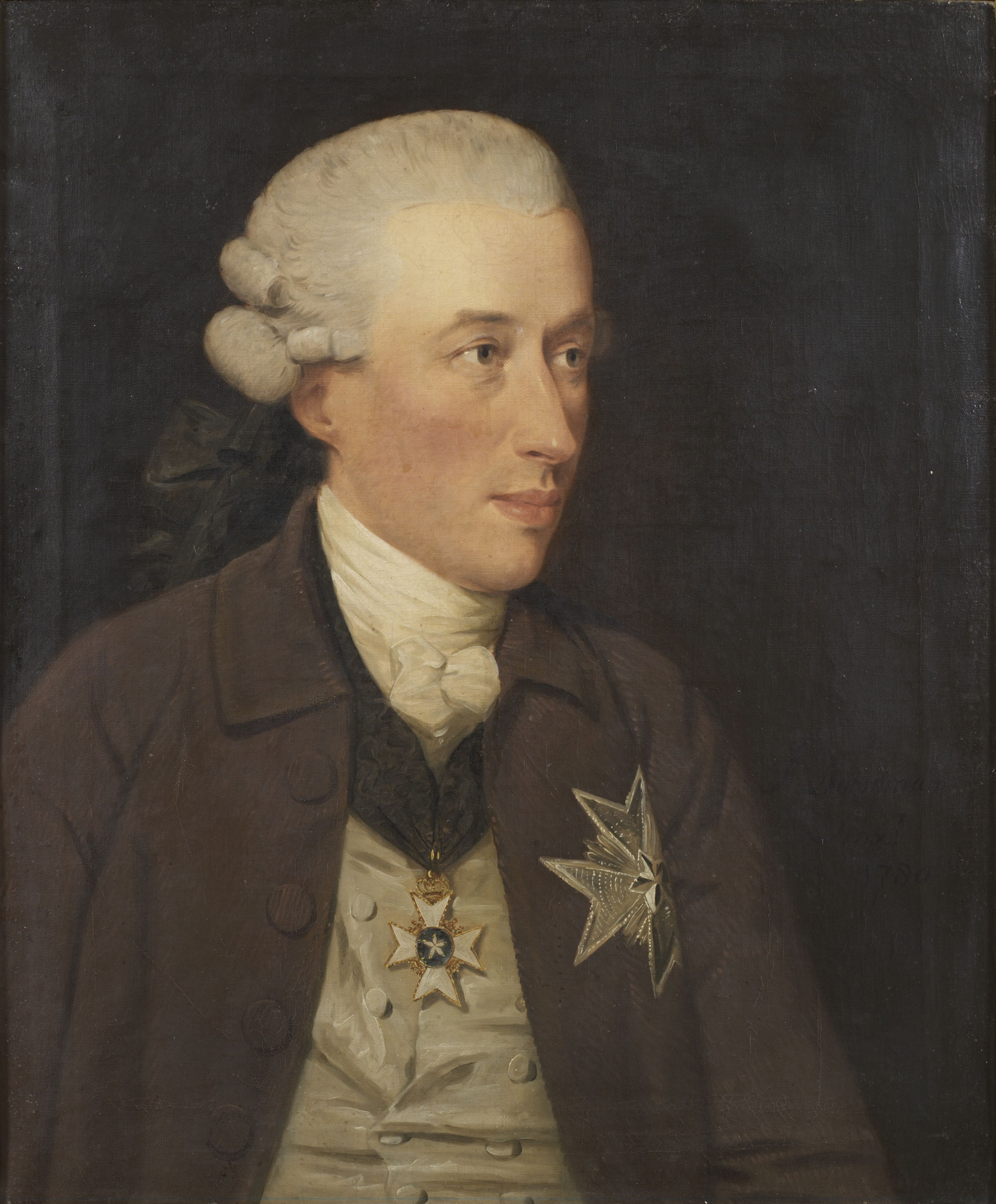
Gustaf Adam von Nolcken (1764–1793)

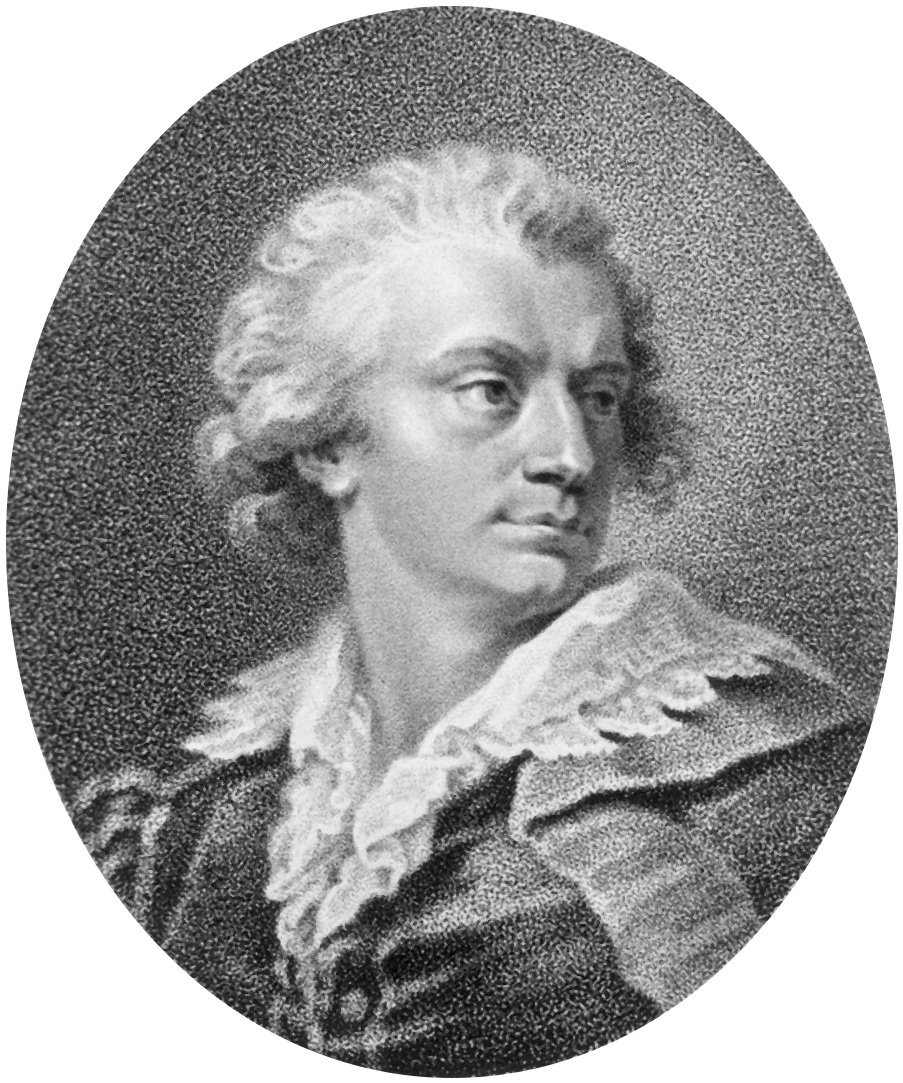
Lars von Engeström (1793–1795)

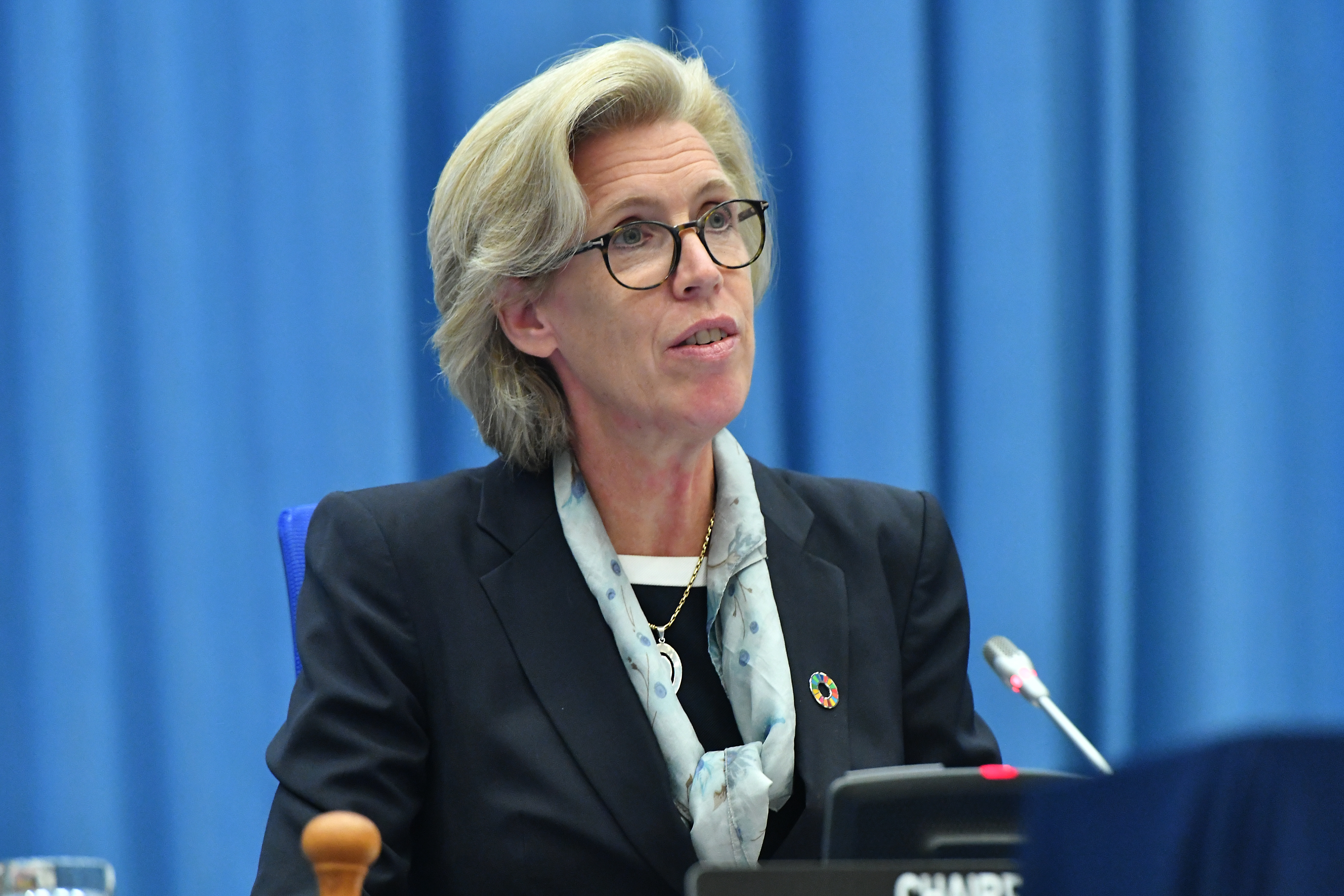
Mikaela Kumlin Granit (2021–2023)

== See also ==
- Embassy of Sweden, London
- Sweden–United Kingdom relations
