= List of ambassadors of Sweden to the United States =

Ambassador of Sweden to the United States
- Lesser coat of arms of the Kingdom of Sweden
- Incumbent; Nicola Clase since 17 August 2026
- Ministry for Foreign Affairs; Swedish Embassy, Washington, D.C.
- Style: His or Her Excellency (formal); Mr. or Madam Ambassador (informal)
- Reports to: Minister for Foreign Affairs
- Residence: 2900 K Street, N.W. (Note: Since 2022, the residence is located in the same building as the chancery.)
- Seat: Washington, D.C., United States
- Appointer: Government of Sweden
- Term length: No fixed term
- Inaugural holder: Johan Albert Kantzow
- Formation: 1812
- Website: Swedish Embassy, Washington, D.C.

The Ambassador of Sweden to the United States (known formally as the Ambassador of the Kingdom of Sweden to the United States of America) is the official representative of the government of Sweden to the president of the United States and federal government of the United States. The Swedish ambassador is in charge of Sweden's diplomatic mission to the United States. The Swedish Embassy is located at the House of Sweden (inaugurated in 2006) at 2900 K Street in Washington, D.C..

== List of representatives ==
| Name | Period | Title | Notes | Ref |
|---|---|---|---|---|
| Johan Albert Kantzow | July 29, 1812 – March 21, 1819 | Resident minister | Assumed office in 1813. | |
| Berndt Robert Gustaf Stackelberg | 21 March 1819 – 1832 | Chargé d'affaires | | |
| David Gustaf Anckarloo | November 22, 1831 – March 8, 1833 | Chargé d'affaires | | |
| Severin Lorich | 1834–1837 | Chargé d'affaires | | |
| Gustaf af Nordin | May 14, 1838 – 1845 | Chargé d'affaires | | |
| Adam Christopher Lövenskiöld | 1845–1850 | Chargé d'affaires | | |
| Georg Sibbern | 1850–1854 | Chargé d'affaires | | |
| Georg Sibbern | 1854–1858 | Resident minister | Returned to Norway in 1856. (Note: Sibbern returned to Norway in 1856 and became the state secretary to the viceroy, Crown Prince Charles. Despite his newly appointed role, Sibbern retained the position of minister resident.) | |
| Wilhelm af Wetterstedt | 27 April 1858 – 1860 | Resident minister | Also Swedish-Norwegian consul general on June 15, 1858. | |
| Carl Edward Vilhelm Piper | July 20, 1861 – 1864 | Resident minister | Also consul general in Washington, D.C. on October 18, 1861. | |
| Wilhelm af Wetterstedt | September 2, 1864 – June 29, 1870 | Envoy extraordinary and minister plenipotentiary | | |
| Oluf Stenersen | 1870 – December 9, 1875 | Envoy | Died in office (in Paris). | |
| Carl Lewenhaupt | March 6, 1876 – 1884 | Envoy | Also acting consul general there from March 10, 1876. | |
| Gustaf Leonard (Lennart) Reuterskiöld | November 15, 1884 – 1888 | Envoy | Also acting consul general there from December 30, 1884. | |
| Johan Anton Wolff Grip | 1889–1906 | Envoy | | |
| Herman Lagercrantz | January 25, 1907 – June 4, 1907 | Acting envoy | | |
| Herman Lagercrantz | June 5, 1907–1910 | Envoy | | |
| Albert Ehrensvärd | October 8, 1910 – 1911 | Envoy | | |
| August Ekengren | 1912–1920 | Envoy | | |
| Claës Bonde | July 18, 1913 – December 9, 1913 | Chargé d'affaires ad interim | | |
| Axel Wallenberg | 1921–1925 | Envoy | | |
| Wollmar Boström | 1925–1945 | Envoy | | |
| Herman Eriksson | October 1, 1945 – December 8, 1947 | Envoy | | |
| Herman Eriksson | December 9, 1947 – 1948 | Ambassador | | |
| Alexis Aminoff | April 21, 1948 | Chargé d'affaires | Due to Herman Eriksson's illness. | |
| Erik Boheman | 1948–1958 | Ambassador | | |
| Gunnar Jarring | 1958–1964 | Ambassador | | |
| Hubert de Bèsche | 1964–1973 | Ambassador | | |
| Yngve Möller | 1972–1972 | Ambassador | Never took office. (Note: Yngve Möller was appointed Swedish ambassador in 1972 but never took office because of a temporary break in Swedish-American relations.) | |
| Leif Leifland | 1973–1974 | Chargé d'affaires ad interim | | |
| Wilhelm Wachtmeister | 1974–1989 | Ambassador | | |
| Anders Thunborg | 1989 – January 1993 | Ambassador | | |
| Henrik Liljegren | 1993–1997 | Ambassador | | |
| Rolf Ekéus | 1997–2000 | Ambassador | | |
| Jan Eliasson | 2000–2005 | Ambassador | | |
| Gunnar Lund | 2005–2007 | Ambassador | | |
| Jonas Hafström | 2007–2013 | Ambassador | | |
| Björn Lyrvall | 2013–2017 | Ambassador | | |
| Karin Olofsdotter | 2017–2023 | Ambassador | | |
| Urban Ahlin | August 15, 2023 – 2026 | Ambassador | | |
| Nicola Clase | August 17, 2026 – present | Ambassador | | |

== See also ==
- Sweden–United States relations
- Embassy of Sweden, Washington, D.C.
- List of ambassadors of the United States to Sweden
