= Hans Forssell =

Swedish historian and political writer (1843–1901)

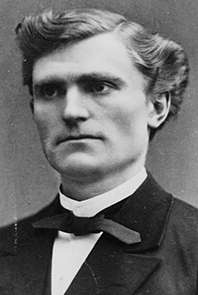
- Hans Forssell in December, 1880.
- Born: Hans Ludvig Forssell; 14 January 1843; Gävle, Sweden
- Died: 31 July 1901 (aged 58); San Bernardino, Switzerland
- Education: Uppsala University
- Occupations: politician, historian, writer

Member of the Swedish Academy (Seat No. 1)
- In office 20 December 1881 – 2 August 1901
- Preceded by: Anders Fryxell
- Succeeded by: Carl Bildt

Hans Ludvig Forssell (14 January 1843 – 2 August 1901) was a Swedish historian and political writer.

== Biography ==
Hans Forssell was born at Gävle, Gästrikland, where his father, the clergyman Carl Adolf Forssell, taught in the gymnasium. At the age of sixteen he became a student at Uppsala University, where he distinguished himself, and where, in 1866, having taken the degree of doctor, he was appointed reader in history.

At the age of thirty, however, Forssell, who had already shown remarkable business capacity, was called to Stockholm, where he filled one important post after another in the Swedish civil service. In 1875, he was appointed head of the treasury, and in 1880 was transferred to the, department of inland revenue, of which he continued to be president until the time of his death. In addition to the responsibilities which these offices devolved upon him, Forssell was constantly called to serve on royal commissions, and his political influence was immense. In spite of all these public duties, which he carried through with the utmost diligence, Forssell also found leisure for an abundant literary activity.

Of his historical writings the most important were: Sveriges inre historia från Gustaf den förste, med särskildt afseende på förvaltning och ekonomi ("The Administrative and Economical History of Sweden after Gustavus I"; 1869–1875) and Sverige 1571. Försök till en administrativ-statistisk beskrifning... ("Sweden in 1571"; 1872). He was also for several years, in company with the poet Carl David af Wirsén, editor of the Swedish Literary Review. He published two volumes of Studies and Criticisms (1875, 1888). In the year 1881, at the death of the historian Anders Fryxell, Forssell was elected to the vacant seat on the Swedish Academy. He was also a member of the Royal Swedish Academy of Sciences from 1876.

The energy of Forssell was so great, and he understood so little the economy of strength, that he unquestionably overtaxed his vital force. His death, however, which occurred with great suddenness on 2 August 1901 while he was staying at San Bernardino in Switzerland, was wholly unexpected. There was little of the typical Swedish urbanity in Forssell's exterior manner, which was somewhat dry and abrupt. Like many able men who have from early life administered responsible public posts, there appeared a certain want of sympathy in his demands upon others. His views were distinct, and held with great firmness; for example, he was a free-trader, and his consistent opposition to what he called the new system had a considerable effect on Swedish policy. He was not exactly an attractive man, but he was a capable, upright and efficient public servant. In 1867 he married his cousin Hildegard Zuleima Eneroth, a goldsmith's daughter from Stockholm; she survived him, with two sons and two daughters.

== Notes ==
Cultural offices
Preceded by Anders Fryxell	Swedish Academy, Seat No 1; 1881–1901	Succeeded by Carl Bildt
