= Gustaf Adam von Nolcken =

Swedish diplomat

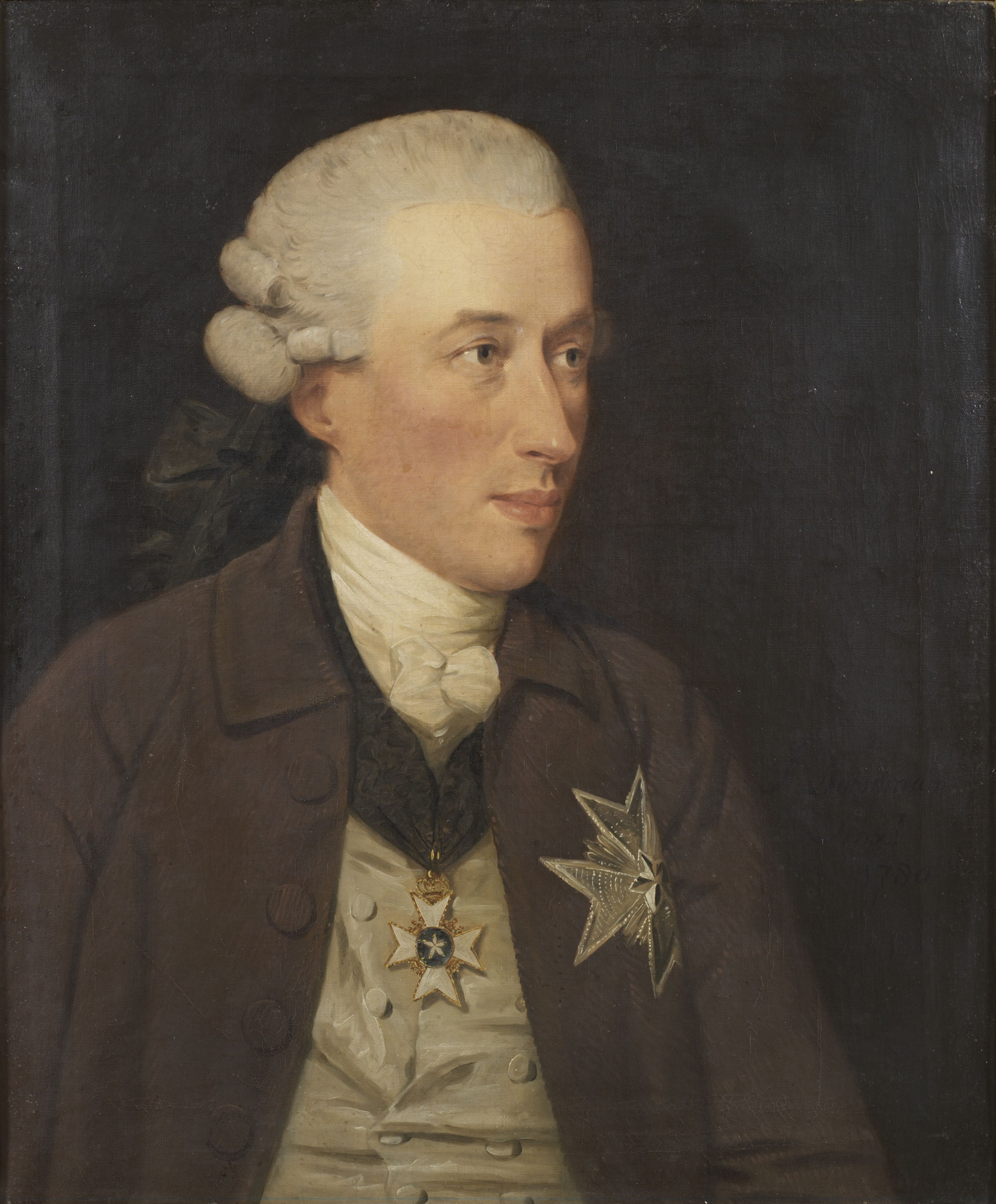
- Portrait of von Nolcken

Envoy of Sweden to the Kingdom of Great Britain
- In office 22 November 1763 – 1793
- Monarchs: Adolf Frederick; Gustav III; Gustav IV Adolf
- Preceded by: Edvard Carleson
- Succeeded by: Lars von Engeström

Personal details
- Born: 17 September 1733 Stralsund, Swedish Pomerania
- Died: 16 December 1812 (aged 79) Richmond, England
- Spouse: Mary Roche
- Parent: Eric Mathias von Nolcken (father)
- Occupation: Diplomat, civil servant

Gustaf Adam von Nolcken (17 September 1733 – 16 December 1812), also rendered in English sources as Gustavus Adam von Nolcken, was a Swedish diplomat and civil servant. He served as Sweden's envoy extraordinary at the Court of St James's from 1764 to 1793, a tenure spanning the American Revolutionary War, the reign of Gustav III of Sweden, and the opening years of the French Revolutionary Wars. He was elected a Fellow of the Royal Society in 1777, came into contact with American diplomats including John Adams, and was later appointed president of the Göta Court of Appeal, although he remained in England.

== Early life and family background ==
Nolcken was born at Stralsund, in Swedish Pomerania, on 17 September 1733. He was the son of the Swedish diplomat and politician Eric Mathias von Nolcken and Christina Margaretha Lode. The von Nolcken family belonged to the Baltic-Swedish nobility; his father had been ennobled in Sweden in 1726 and created a Swedish baron in 1747.

== Diplomatic career ==
Nolcken entered Swedish state service in 1750 as a clerk in the foreign chancery and was appointed to court service in 1754. His first foreign posting came in 1756, when he was sent to Berlin as commission secretary; the following year he was appointed Sweden's chargé d'affaires there. In 1761 he became embassy secretary at Augsburg.

In 1763 Nolcken was appointed Swedish envoy extraordinary to the Court of St James's in London. Editorial notes in the Adams Papers describe him as Swedish envoy to Great Britain from 1764 to 1793. His London tenure covered the later years of the reign of George III, the American Revolutionary War, the reign of Gustav III of Sweden, and the opening years of the French Revolutionary Wars.

The American Revolutionary War created difficulties for Swedish neutral shipping. In December 1779 the Royal Navy detained two Swedish merchant ships carrying naval stores in the Downs while they were under the escort of the Swedish frigate Trolle. David Syrett records that, as the confrontation between the warships developed, a secretary from the Swedish embassy arrived on board Trolle with orders that the Swedish warship should not attempt to recover the merchant ships by force; the incident ended with Trolle departing and leaving the two merchant ships behind.

== Relations with American diplomats ==
Nolcken's long residence in London brought him into contact with American diplomats after the recognition of the United States. In February 1784, while John Adams was visiting Britain, Nolcken requested an introduction to him through Thomas Pownall, the former governor of Massachusetts. Adams reported that Nolcken had been "twenty Years" at the Court of St James's and had watched "the Rise, Progress and End of the dispute with America". Adams also quoted Nolcken's advice that the United States should observe European conflicts "with a philosophical Tranquility"; the editors of the Adams Papers note that Adams "put considerable store in Nolcken's comments". Nolcken's name also appears in the papers of John Jay, who recorded discussing a missing-prisoner matter with him in February 1795.

== Royal Society and the Swedish community in London ==
Nolcken was elected a Fellow of the Royal Society on 8 May 1777. By the early 1780s he was, in the words of the Adams Papers editors, long established in Britain and his judgement on British politics and foreign relations was taken seriously by Adams.

Nolcken was also associated with the Swedish Lutheran Church at Prince's Square in London, which served Scandinavian timber merchants, embassy staff and sailors in the East End. A history of the church states that its articles were drawn up by Nolcken and subscribed under the sign manual of Gustav III with the royal seal affixed.

== Marriage and family ==
Nolcken married Mary Roche in England on 30 June 1779. She was the widow of Stefan Caesar Le Maistre and the daughter of James Roche and Mary Brown. The National Portrait Gallery identifies her as Mary, née Roche, Baroness Nolcken, formerly Mrs Le Maistre.

A contemporary obituary in The Gentleman's Magazine stated that Nolcken and Mary Roche had two sons: Gustaf, Baron Nolcken, who lived with his father, and George Henry Nolcken, a godson of George III who served in the 3rd Regiment of Guards and later became a captain in the 83rd Foot.

== Later years and death ==
The Government Art Collection describes Nolcken as "a loyal friend of King Gustaf III". Gustav III was assassinated in March 1792. In 1793 Nolcken was appointed president of the Göta Court of Appeal, but he declined the office and remained in England without a diplomatic position.

A contemporary obituary in The Gentleman's Magazine stated that Nolcken had been recalled after the death of Gustav III and had refused the Swedish judicial appointment partly because of his attachment to Britain and partly because he did not consider himself suited to judicial office. The same obituary said that George III, acting through a British representative in Stockholm, unsuccessfully asked that Nolcken should remain as Swedish minister in London.

Nolcken died at Richmond, England, on 16 December 1812, after nearly 49 years' residence in Britain. He was buried later that month in the Swedish church in London.

== Portraits ==
Several portraits of Nolcken and his wife are recorded in public collections. Art UK records an oil portrait of Baron Gustav Adam von Nolcken (1733–1813), attributed to the Swedish painter Per Krafft the Elder. A miniature portrait by John Smart is held by the Nationalmuseum in Stockholm, which identifies the sitter as Gustaf Adam von Nolcken, with the fuller name Gerhard Gustaf Adam Nolcken. The UK Government Art Collection holds a portrait by John Downman. Art UK also records a portrait of Mary, Baroness Nolcken.

Diplomatic posts
Preceded by Edvard Carleson	Envoy of Sweden to the Kingdom of Great Britain; 1763–1793	Succeeded by Lars von Engeström
