= Carl Edward Vilhelm Piper =

Swedish nobleman and diplomat

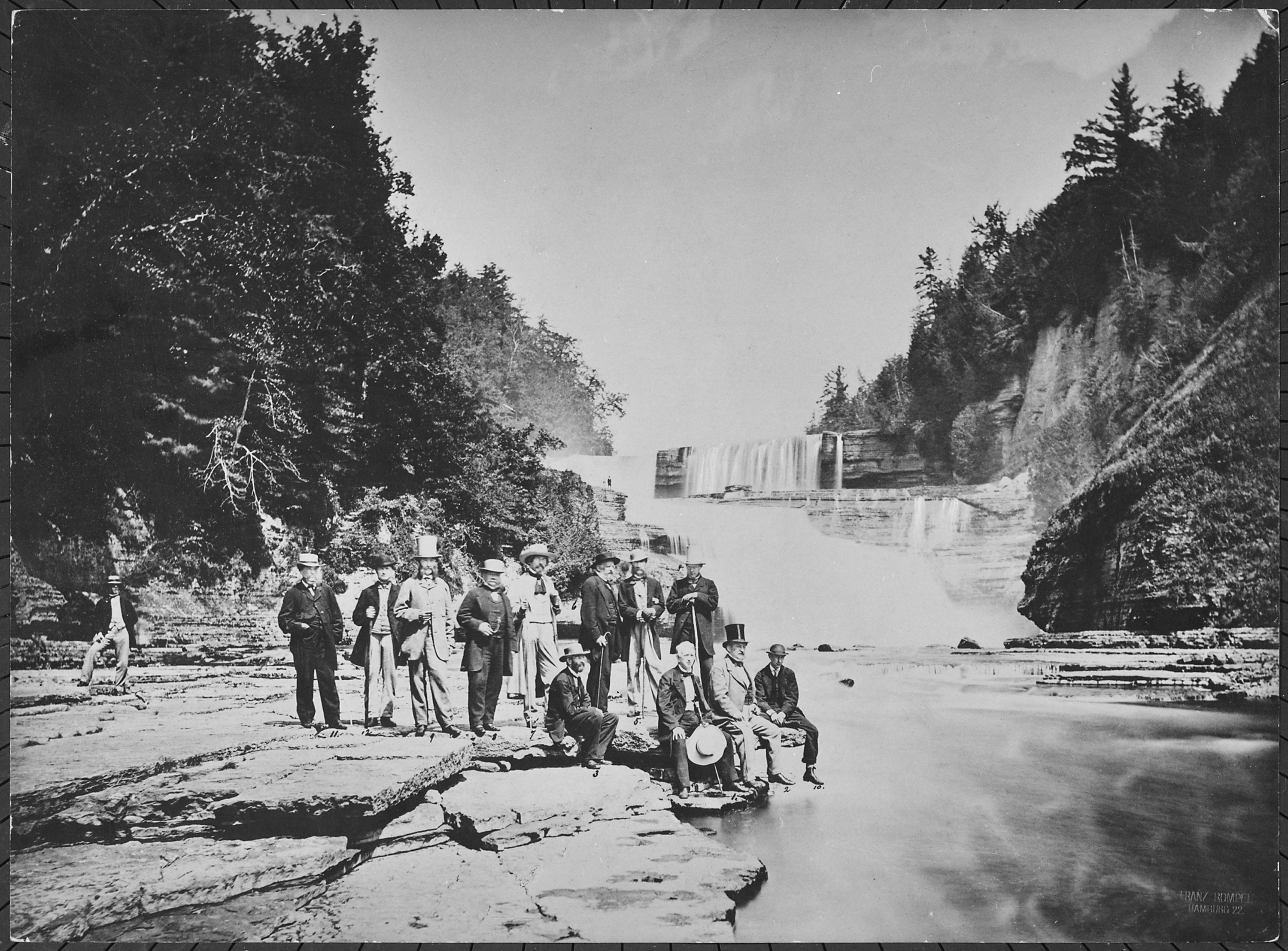
Piper (fourth from the left with a pocket watch), and other diplomats in New York State, 1863.

Count Carl Edward Vilhelm Piper (28 January 1820 – 25 September 1891) was a Swedish nobleman and diplomat. In the beginning of his career he worked in the Swedish Foreign Office and had served as Swedish-Norwegian legation-secretary in Copenhagen during the Crimean War. In the late 1850s he served as envoyée to Italy. In 1861 he was appointed minister to the United States and served to 1864, when he was replaced by Baron Wilhelm af Wetterstedt. Initially, Piper was very critical of Americans and the U.S. political system, Americans lacked love of the nation and the constitution needed to be changed. In 1864 he moderated his views, and believed that Americans were basically all right. Piper was very close to Secretary of State William H. Seward.

Diplomatic posts
Preceded by Wilhelm af Wetterstedt	Resident minister of Sweden to the United States; 1861–1864	Succeeded by Wilhelm af Wetterstedt as Envoy
Preceded by Wilhelm af Wetterstedt	Consul General of Sweden in Washington; 1861–1864	Succeeded by Wilhelm af Wetterstedt
Preceded by Carl Fredrik Hochschild as Resident minister	Envoy of Sweden to Italy; 1865–1872	Succeeded by Hans Henrik von Essen
Preceded by Frederik Due	Envoy of Sweden to Austria-Hungary; 1872–1877	Succeeded by Hans Henric von Essen
Preceded by Carl Fredrik Hochschild	Envoy of Sweden to the United Kingdom of Great Britain and Ireland; 1877–1890	Succeeded by Henrik Åkerman
