= Giovanni Gherardi =

Italian jurist, mathematician and writer (c. 1360–1446)

Giovanni di Gherardo da Prato
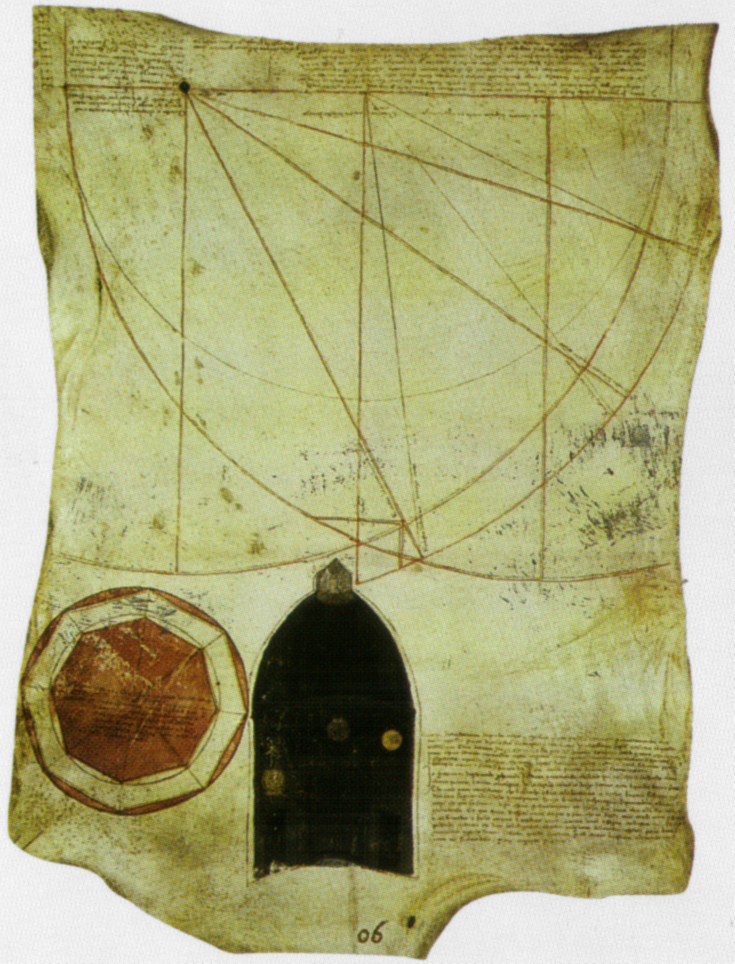
- Giovanni Gherardo, drawing with observations on the tracing of the Dome of Santa Maria del Fiore, 1426
- Born: probably between 1360 and 1367; Prato, Tuscany
- Died: before 1446
- Resting place: probably at Church of San Domenico in Prato, Italy
- Citizenship: Italy
- Education: University of Florence
- Known for: Literary Works; Poetic Rivalry with Filippo Brunelleschi
- Scientific career
- Fields: Jury; Mathematician writer
- Workplaces: Florentine Studio; Santa Maria del Fiore

Giovanni di Gherardo da Prato, or Giovanni Gherardi (Prato, 1360/1367 – before 1446), was an Italian jurist, mathematician, writer and humanist.

== Biography ==
Gherardo's father was a second-hand dealer; his grandfather Bartolo, as shown by the title of "ser", had practiced the profession of notary. He studied law in Padua where he also followed the lessons of Biagio Pelacani, a well-known philosopher and mathematician.

Having settled in Florence, he began working as a judge and notary while taking a keen interest in literary studies. From 1414 he was legal consultant and archivist of Orsanmichele. In 1417 he taught courses on Dante's works at the Florentine Studio until the teaching position was discontinued in 1425. In that period he wrote the novel entitled Paradiso degli Alberti, named after a famous villa near Florence.

In 1420, he was appointed deputy administrator of the dome of Santa Maria del Fiore in Florence, serving as Lorenzo Ghiberti's assistant and a fierce rival of the other administrator, Filippo Brunelleschi. In a parchment from 1426, preserved in the State Archives of Florence, he criticized several of Filippo's decisions through both drawings and writings. His critiques included issues like the insufficient interior lighting and the sharp curvature of the dome's vaults, referred to as the acute fifth (or sixth). He also opposed the "rippled" inclination of the brick-laying beds, arguing that they should be aligned with the center of the monument, rather than following the acute fifth curvature.

According to him, these flaws posed a serious risk of causing the monument's collapse. To dissuade others from supporting what he believed to be a "misguided" project, he pointed out that "the Cathedral of Siena collapsed... for having trusted someone without proper knowledge." Indeed, the unfinished structures of the Siena Cathedral, which were planned to be much larger than the current one, are still visible today as a reminder of that failure. Giovanni's document is particularly important also because it is the only graphic testimony with technical commentary of the great work in progress.

The contrast between the two is also demonstrated by an exchange of poetic compositions written in a Burchiellesque tone on the occasion of the dispute over a vessel for the transport of stones by river, patented by Filippo in 1421: on that occasion the "ship" (name which was given to cargo boats operating in the Arno) driven by (mechanical) propellers moved by wind energy, devices and mechanisms specially invented by Brunelleschi. The "ship" took the name of "Badalone". This was short-lived because a few months after its launch, a flood destroyed it and caused it to run aground near Montelupo, losing part of the materials it was transporting in 1428. Brunelleschi himself attempted to recover it in vain. There is a copy of this mechanical ship attributed to Leonardo da Vinci on the basis of which the prof. Massimo Ricci has created a working model. The model is currently located in the premises of the Opera del Duomo of Florence in Piazza San Giovanni together with three Brunelleschi machines for the construction of the Lantern of the Dome of Santa Maria del Fiore.

== Literary works ==
As a disciple of Cino Rinuccini, he was also the author of various poems, including Gioco d'Amore II, the Treatise on an Angelic Thing Shown for a Most Devout Vision (written in the form of a mystical polymeter), a two-book allegorical poem in imitation of Dante, and an unfinished work titled Philomena. The manuscript of Philomena is preserved in the National Central Library of Florence, cataloged as ms. Magliabechiano VII, 702.

A prose work consisting of five books has been attributed to him where, in imitation of Boccaccio's Filocolo, short stories, mythological stories, descriptions of Tuscan landscapes, imagined journeys and conversations held in the spring of 1389 by a cultured brigade are narrated at the Villa del Paradiso in the village of Bandino by Antonio Alberti. The work was rediscovered in 1864 by Aleksander Wesselofsky who identified its author and gave him the title Paradiso degli Alberti; the first publication of the work was his (1867–69), accompanied by a vast critical apparatus.

The poem L'Acquettino was composed against Giovanni da Prato around 1406.

The character of Giovanni da Prato appears with Antonio Alberti in the guesthouse of the Convento del Paradiso in Lorenzo Andreaggi's film trabocchetti del Bandino I, played by Niccolò Biffoli.
