= Embassy of Sweden, Rome =

- Location: Rome
- Address: Ambasciata di Svezia; Piazza Rio de Janeiro 3; 00161 ROMA RM; Italy
- Coordinates: 41.91250°N 12.50818°E
- Ambassador: Karin Höglund
- Jurisdiction: Italy; San Marino
- Website: Official website

The Embassy of Sweden in Rome is Sweden's diplomatic mission in Italy. The Swedish embassy in Rome dates back to the 1450s and is thus the oldest in the world. Birger Månsson was sent to Rome because the Swedish government wanted to improve the relationship with the Pope. Today, the embassy is also a representation at the UN agencies in Rome: Food and Agriculture Organization (FAO), World Food Programme (WFP) and the International Fund for Agricultural Development (IFAD). The ambassador has a dual accreditation in San Marino.

== History ==
The Swedish legation in Rome has very old roots. Already in the 1400s, Sweden dispatched a delegate to protect its interests at the Roman Curia, the highest administrative body of the Roman Catholic Church. In March 1956 an agreement was reached between the Swedish and Italian governments on the mutual elevation of the respective countries' legations to embassies. In connection with this, on 2 March the Swedish government appointed the then envoy, Baron Johan Beck-Friis, as Sweden's ambassador in Rome.

Today, the Embassy of Sweden covers Italy and San Marino. The embassy is also responsible for Sweden's relations with the UN bodies based in Rome – Food and Agriculture Organization (FAO), World Food Programme (WFP) and International Fund for Agricultural Development (IFAD).

== Staff and tasks ==
At the embassy, the staff is organized into several key departments and positions:

- Ambassador's Office: Includes the Ambassador, an assistant to the ambassador, and administrative and protocol officers who handle administrative tasks and translations.
- Political Section: Overseen by a Minister Counsellor who is the Deputy Head of Mission and Section Chief. This section also includes Counsellors, political issue officers, and an intern.
- UN Section: Includes a Minister Counsellor who is the Deputy Permanent Representative to the Food and Agriculture Organization (FAO), a Counsellor who is the Deputy Permanent Representative to the World Food Programme (WFP) and the International Fund for Agricultural Development (IFAD), as well as program officers and an intern.
- Business, Culture, and Communication Section: Managed by a Counsellor who is the Section Chief. This section includes officers for communication, promotion, and culture, a business officer, and an intern.
- Consular, Administrative, and Migration Section: Headed by a Counsellor who is the Administrative Chief. This section also includes a Third Secretary who is an archivist and Deputy Section Chief, a Treasurer, administrative officers for property matters, several consular officers, a migration officer, a migration assistant, and an administrative assistant/driver.
- Defence Section: Led by an officer who is the Defence Attaché and Section Chief, supported by an assistant to the Defence Attaché.
- Business Sweden Office: Includes a Trade Secretary managing trade-related activities.

== Buildings ==
=== Chancery ===
From 1894, the chancery was located at Palazzo Capranica, via Teatro Valle 16. In 1922, it was located at 3 Piazza Galeno and between 1923 and 1928 at Via di Villa Patrizi 3 in the Quarter of Nomentano. In 1929 it moved around the corner to Viale del Policlinico 131 where it remained until 1931. In 1932, the chancery moved back to Via di Villa Patrizi 3 where it remained until 1944. Between 1945 and 1947, it was located at Viale Michele Bianchi 12 GA. From 1948 to 1967, the chancery was located at Viale del Policlinico 129 A.

The chancery is located at Piazza Rio de Janeiro 3 and was designed in the years 1965–66 and completed in 1967. Inin north-ea April 1977, Sweden purchased the property from the Pontifical Institute for Foreign Missions (PIME) through the National Property Board of Sweden's predecessor the National Board of Public Building (Byggnadsstyrelsen). PIME, an organisation that dates back over 150 years, also owned the villa that previously stood on the same plot. Not far from Villa Borghese lies the Piazza Rio de Janeiro st Rome. With its modernist facade, the property stands apart from the surrounding buildings in the area, which are older and more classical in nature.

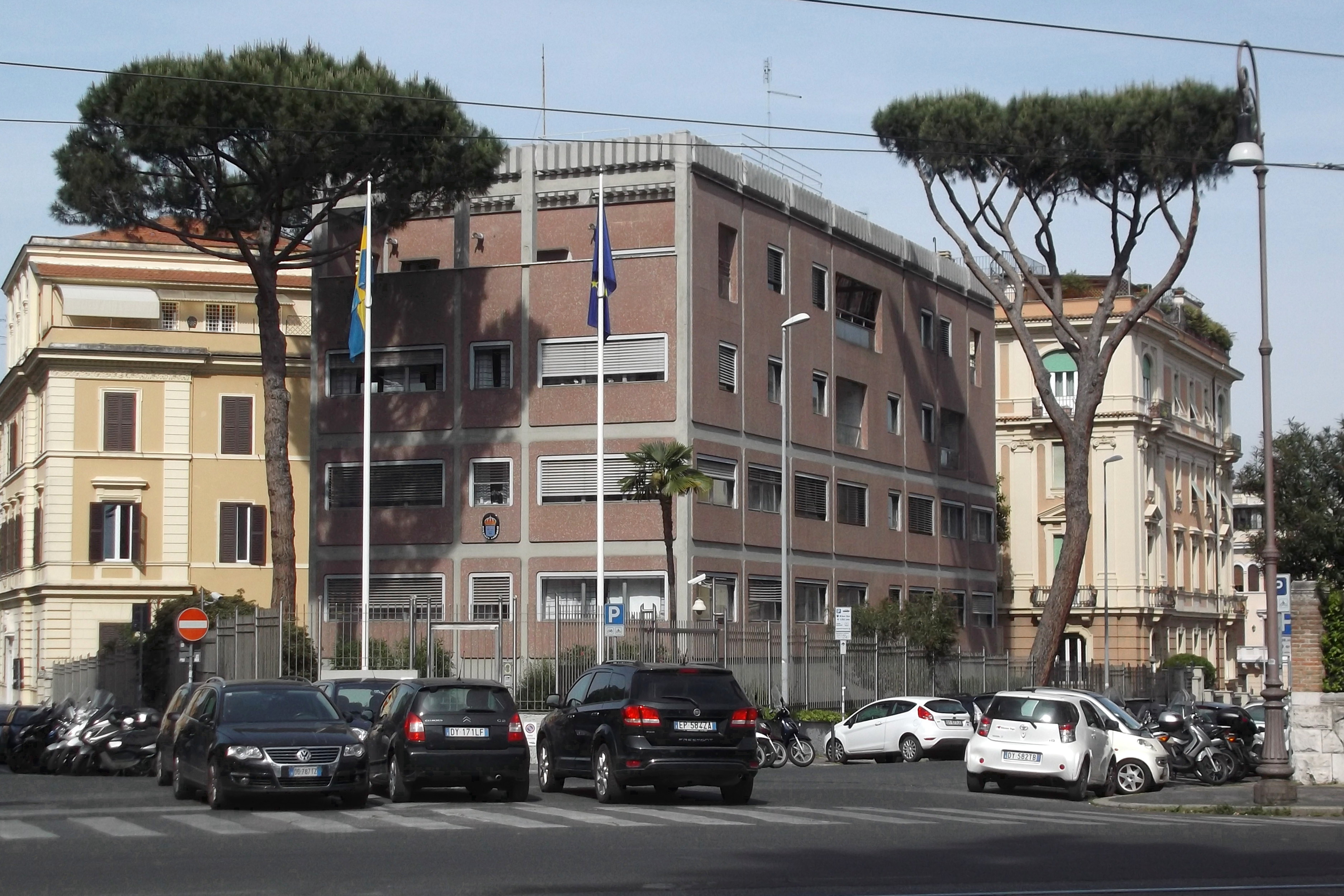
Piazza Rio de Janeiro 3
(1968–present)

=== Residence ===
The ambassador's residence is centrally located at Via di Villa Patrizi 5. The property is 1,500 square meters and is situated in a well-maintained lush green garden surrounded by high walls and gates. The house was built in 1896, and the architect was Luigi Rolland. The Swedish state purchased the property on 18 April 1922. The purchase price of 1 million Italian lira. In connection with the purchase, the architect Ragnar Hjorth was commissioned to draw up plans for renovation, but his proposal was not implemented. The building has been renovated and reconstructed several times. Among other things, a garage, a new entrance, and a greenhouse have been added. In 2008-2009, the National Property Board of Sweden carried out a project aiming to return to a more authentic plaster façade. The new façade now blends into the surrounding architecture. Today, the Swedish Ministry for Foreign Affairs is the tenant.

Between at least 1945 and 1949, Via di Villa Patrizi 3 was used as residence before relocating to number 5 on the same street from 1950.

== See also ==
- Italy–Sweden relations
