= Italy–Sweden relations =

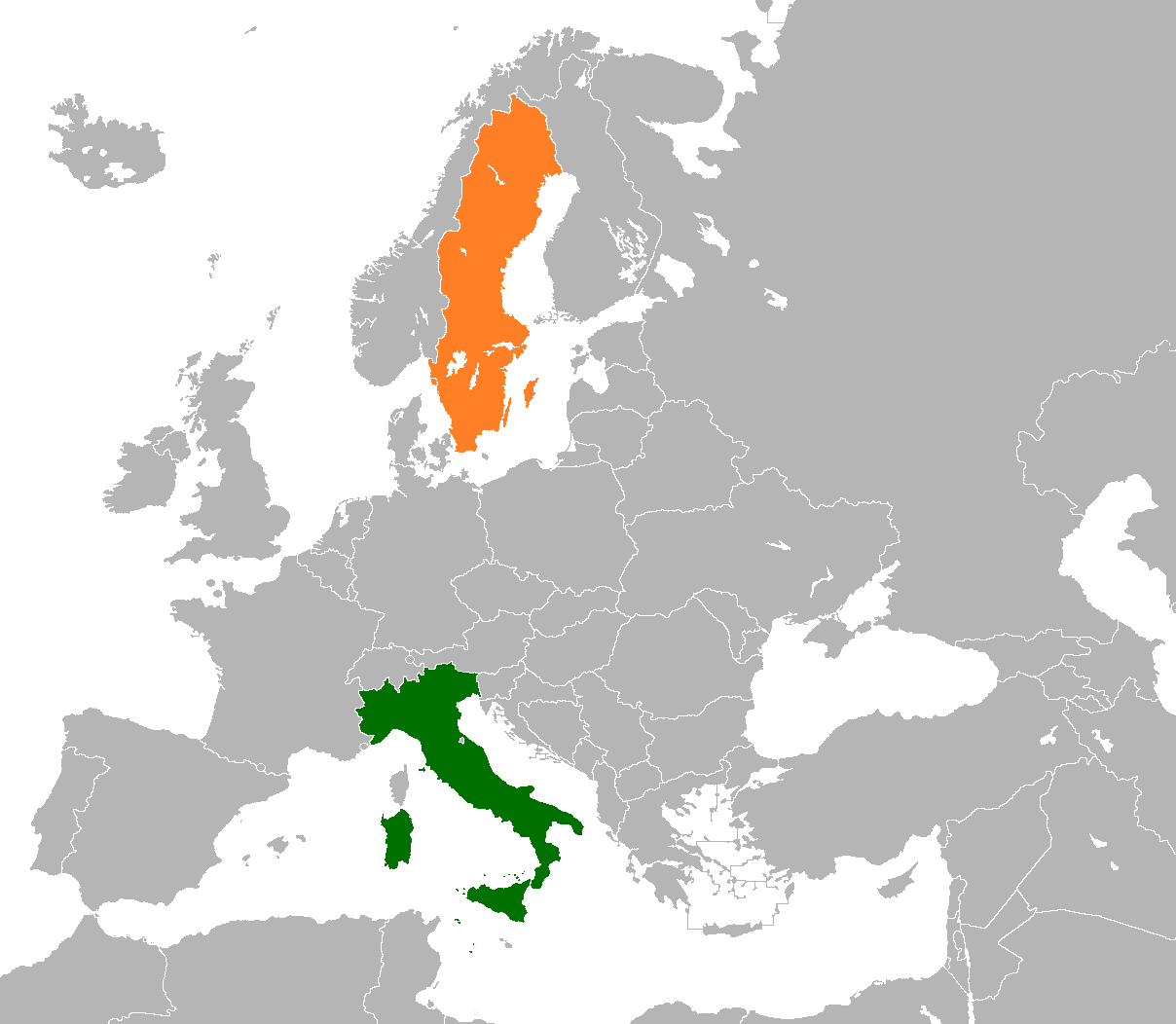
- Italy: Sweden

Italy and Sweden have maintained bilateral relations since the 19th century. Italy has an embassy in Stockholm and Sweden has one in Rome; both countries also have several consulates.

When Italy bombed the Swedish ambulance in Abyssinia in December 1935, protests began.

Today (as of 2012) the ties can be described as strong, especially because of Italian immigrants settling in Sweden after World War II while an increasing number of Swedish charter tourists began to travel to Italy. Since the late 1940s, many Swedish soccer players have been successful in Italian club teams. Both countries are full members of Council of Europe, NATO and European Union.

== History ==
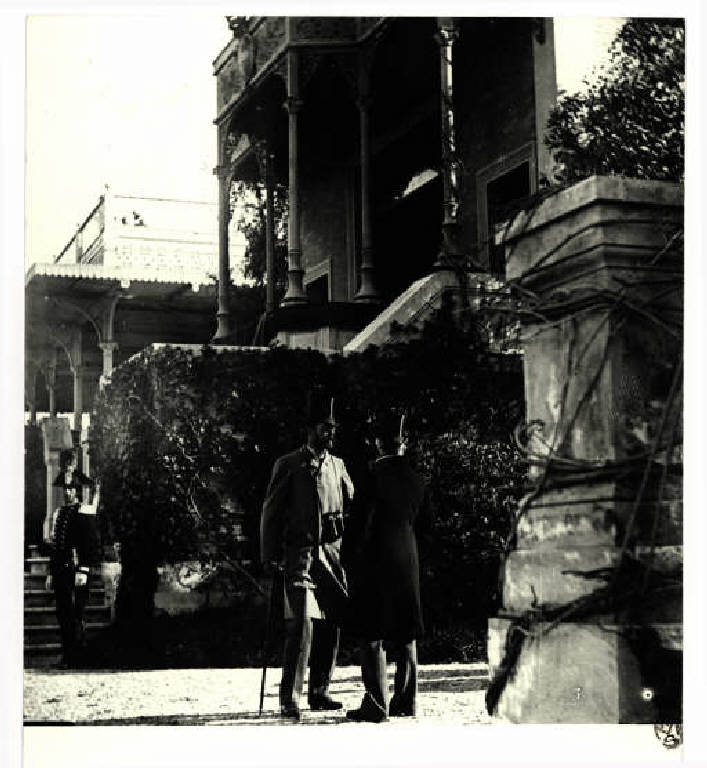
Gustav Bernadotte with Umberto I at the end of the 19th century

Historical evidence shows some official encounters between the two countries' Heads of State during the years.

In the 1890s, the Crown Prince of Sweden and Norway Gustav Bernadotte visited Italy to meet King Umberto I.

In 1933, King Vittorio Emanuele III met with King Gustav V.

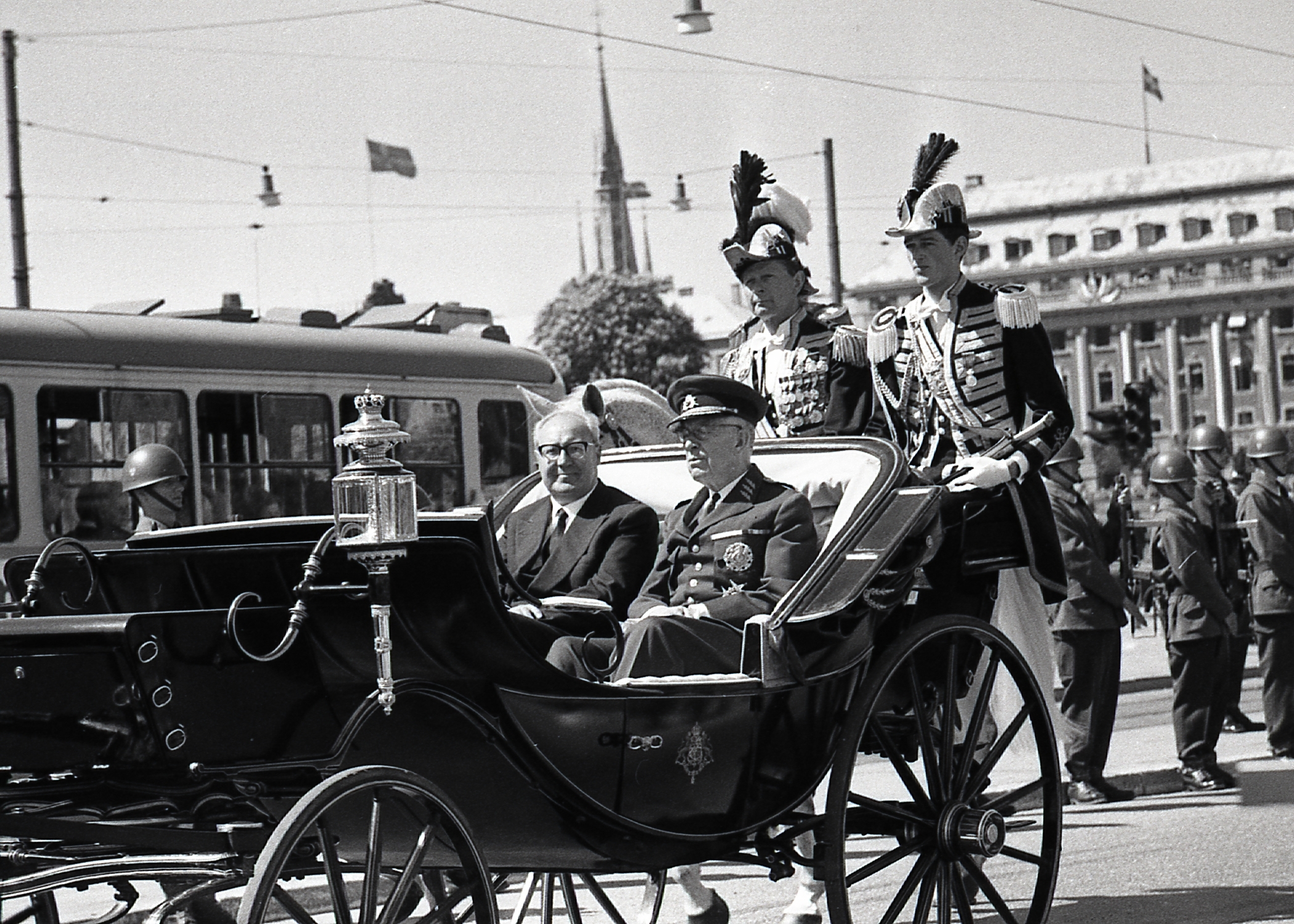
King Gustaf VI Adolf of Sweden and the President of Italy, Giuseppe Saragat

In 1966 King Gustaf VI Adolf of Sweden and the President of Italy, Giuseppe Saragat were photographed in a carriage.

Italy and Sweden are both part of the European Union. Italy was one of the six countries that founded it in 1951 by signing the Treaty of Paris, which created the European Coal and Steel Community. Sweden became a member of the European Union on 1 January 1995, when the country joined the European Economic Community.

Sweden and Italy became members of the United Nations respectively in 1946 and 1955.

Italy and Sweden were both in the coalition of 35 countries that fought Iraq in the Gulf War (1990–1991). The coalition was led by the United Nations, and more specifically by the United States of America. The Gulf War was preceded by the occupation of the Kuwait region by Iraq and an embargo declared by the Security Council against Iraq. Italy contributed to the conflict through its air forces and the 225 missions that were concluded were collectively given the name of Operazione Locusta. Sweden held a field hospital and had a role in the disarmament of Iraq, following the war (1991–2003). On 18 May 2022, former Italian Prime Minister Mario Draghi announced that Italy would fully support Finland and Sweden's applications for NATO membership. Italy backed Sweden's bid to join NATO in May 2022. In August 2022, Italy fully approved Sweden's application for NATO membership.

== Economic cooperation ==
Italy and Sweden are trade partners.

Italy is Sweden's 12th most important trade partner. Swedish exports to Italy amounted to 4.24 billion dollars, 2.78% of its total sum in 2020. In the same year Italy accounted for 3.71% of Sweden's total value of imports, with 5.19 billion dollars.

In 2020, Sweden represented 1.08% of total Italian exports, amounting to 5.19 billion dollars and 0.99% of total Italian imports, for a value of 4.24 billion dollars. In 2021, Sweden was Italy's 18th commercial partner with regard to Italian exports and the 23rd in relation to its imports.

The main sectors for Sweden's imports from Italy are machinery, motor vehicles and trailers, food and metallurgical products. The most important sectors for Italy's imports from Sweden in 2018 were paper and paper products.

As of 2016 there were 145 Italian companies operating in Sweden which employ 5153 people. These are mainly commercial branches. Some Italian companies have also shown interest for infrastructural projects regarding, for example, the Swedish railway. In the same year there were 300 Swedish companies operating within the Italian territory and employing almost 36000 people. These include Ericsson, Volvo, H&M and IKEA.

=== International obligations ===
In 1980, Sweden and Italy concluded a treaty for the avoidance of double taxation and the prevention of fiscal evasion with respect to taxes on income and capital. Italy signed the treaty on 6 March 1980 and ratified it on 4 June 1982. In Italy, the treaty entered into force on 5 July 1983.

== Cultural cooperation ==
Cultural relations between Italy and Sweden are mainly in the education sector and the arts.

In 1941, after the conclusion of a bilateral agreement between the two States, the first Italian Institute for the development of Italian language was created in Stockholm. In 1954 it became the "Italian Institute of Culture in Stockholm" for the mutual transmission and sharing of the two cultures. The creation of this institute was a starting point for future artistic and cultural collaborations. Italy and Sweden have a number of educational exchanges from high school to post-doctoral level and scholarships. The Italian Institute of Culture and the Italian Embassy in Stockholm promote and facilitate cultural ties between Italian and Swedish cultures and organizations

Cultural cooperation also is developed through events both in Sweden and in Italy, such as art exhibitions. Sweden exhibits art at the Nordic pavilion at the Biennale of Venice, which was built in 1962.

== Scientific cooperation ==
In 2014 an Italy-Sweden Joint Committee signed the 2014–2017 Executive Programme of Scientific and Technological Cooperation which regards Italian-Swedish partnership in science and technology in relation to the economy, the society and the culture of the two countries. The Committee approved five financed projects on areas of common interest, such as Cultural heritage, Nanoscience and Neuroscience.

In 2017 the Italian MAECI (Ministry of Foreign Affairs and International cooperation) in collaboration with the MIUR (Ministry of Education, University and Research) launched a call for joint research projects between Italy and Sweden as a part of the 2018–2020 science and technology cooperation agreement. Among the prioritized areas of research there was Natural hazard, Technology applied to Nanoscience, Neuroscience and Oncology, Clear Energy, Intelligent Factory and Cyber Security, as well as Technology and Research applied to Cultural Heritage.

== Resident diplomatic missions ==
Italy has an embassy in Stockholm.

Sweden has an embassy in Rome.

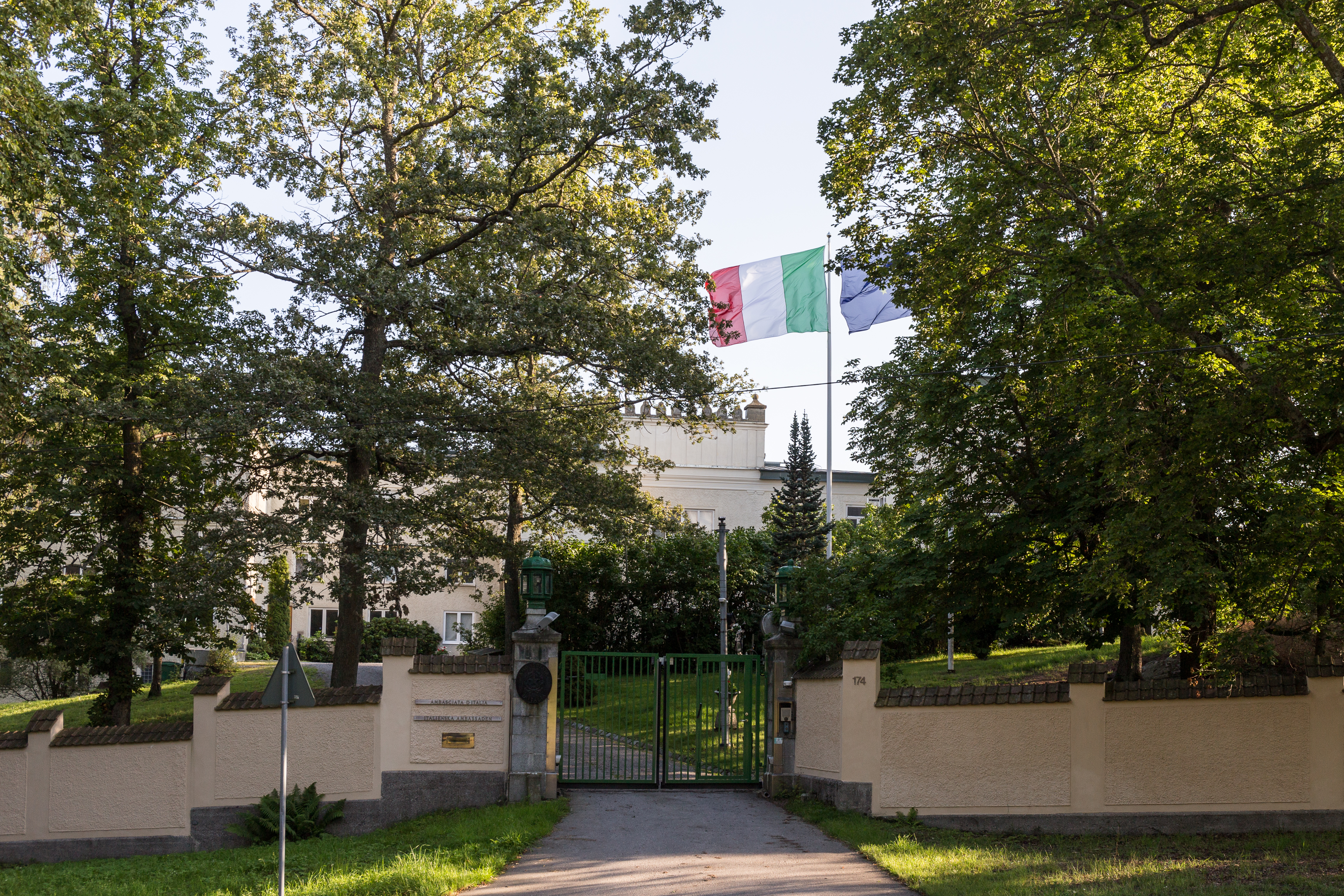
Embassy of Italy in Stockholm

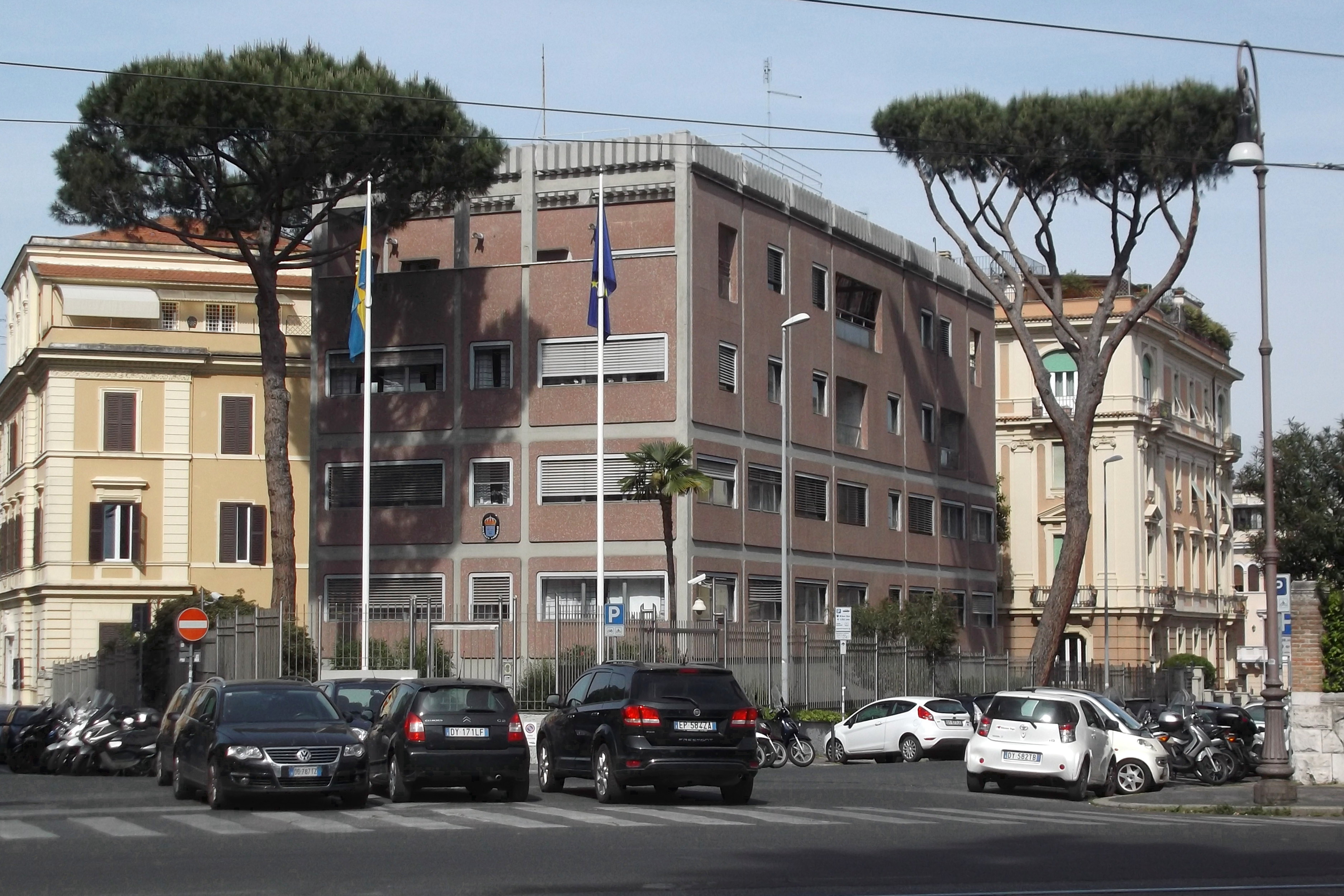
Embassy of Sweden in Rome

Italy has 7 other representations in Sweden, These include consulates in Malmö, Umeå, Sundsvall, Gothenburg and vice consulates in Luleå, Karlstad, Visby.

== See also ==
- Foreign relations of Italy
- Foreign relations of Sweden
- NATO-EU relations
- Swedish Italians
