= Poznań Old Zoo =

Zoo in Poland

The Old Zoo in Poznań Stare Zoo w Poznaniu
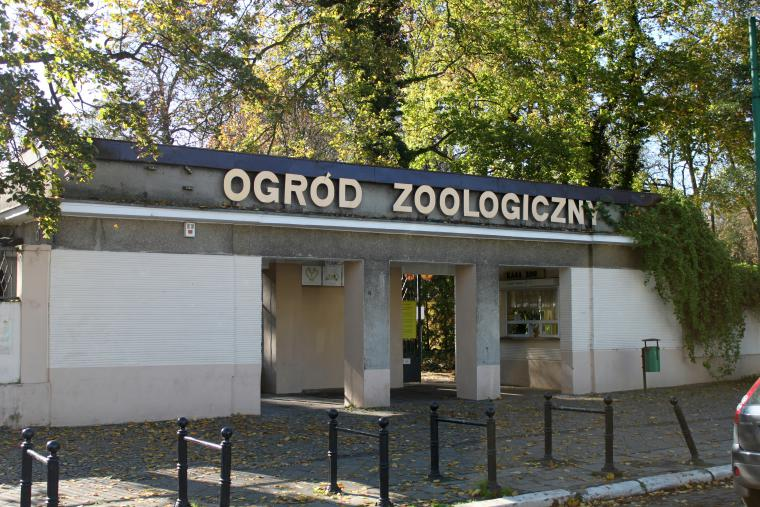
- Main entrance to the Old Zoo in Poznań
- Interactive map of The Old Zoo in Poznań; Stare Zoo w Poznaniu
- 52.408333°N 16.906389°E
- Date opened: 1874, 1974
- Location: Poznań, Poland
- Land area: 5.24 ha (12.9 acres) (Old Zoo) / 120.6 ha (298 acres) (New Zoo)
- No. of animals: 2432
- No. of species: 368 (including the New Zoo in Poznań)
- Memberships: EAZA, WAZA
- Owner: City of Poznań
- Director: Ewa Zgrabczyńska
- Website: zoo.poznan.pl

The Poznań Old Zoo (Polish: Stare Zoo w Poznaniu) is one of the oldest zoological gardens in Poland, located in the city of Poznań, Greater Poland Voivodeship. It was founded in 1874 and was included on the register of objects of cultural heritage in 1978 as a unique example of a vivarium. The zoo started as a few animals kept by a restaurant owner in the early 1870s. It can thus be considered the oldest continuously operating Polish zoological garden. Together with the New Zoo in Poznań, which opened in 1974, it forms an integral part of the whole complex known as The Zoological Garden in Poznań (Ogród Zoologiczny w Poznaniu).

The zoo is a member of both the European Association of Zoos and Aquaria since 1992 and the World Association of Zoos and Aquariums since 1999.

== History ==
The zoo traces its origins to 1871, when a group of local bowlers and regulars of a restaurant at Starogard-Poznań railway station in Jeżyce decided to give President of Bowling Association an unusual birthday present. Each of the bowling players brought a different animal including a pig, a goat, a sheep, a cat, a rabbit, a squirrel, a goose, a duck, a chicken, a peacock as well as a trained bear and a monkey. This small menagerie was gradually expanded thanks to animals given by local inhabitants of Poznań and eventually became the foundation of the future zoo. In 1874, the joint stock company called "The Zoological Garden" was formally established. In 1875, the Zoological Garden Society was founded and consisted of 15 members who held their positions up until the outbreak of World War I.

The management board of the society consisted of such figures as Franciszek Chłapowski, Ludwik Frankiewicz and Count Wawrzyniec Benzelstjerna Engeström. In 1877, the complex officially assumed the name of a Zoological Garden, the inscription being written on a bilingual Polish-German board at the main entrance to the zoo. In 1880, the collection comprised 250 animals representing 59 species. The garden developed rapidly and regular concerts, shows and other cultural events were organized at the zoo. The zoo underwent major renovations and expansions during the tenure of Robert Jaeckel (1851–1907) and his close aide Stanisław Zieliński (1844–1928). These included the building of the Alpinarium, the Elephants' Pavilion, deer and ostriches enclosures, as well as an aviary. In 1886, the management of the zoo negotiated the purchase of land from the Prussian Eastern Railways and after five years the area of the zoo increased to 5.24 hectares. In 1909, the zoological garden housed a collection of 900 animals of more than 400 species and the annual number of visitors amounted to 250,000. In 1913 and 1914, Johann Strauss III gave concerts at the zoo in Poznań. In July 1914 a major ethnographic exhibition presenting tribes of the Nile valley was organized.

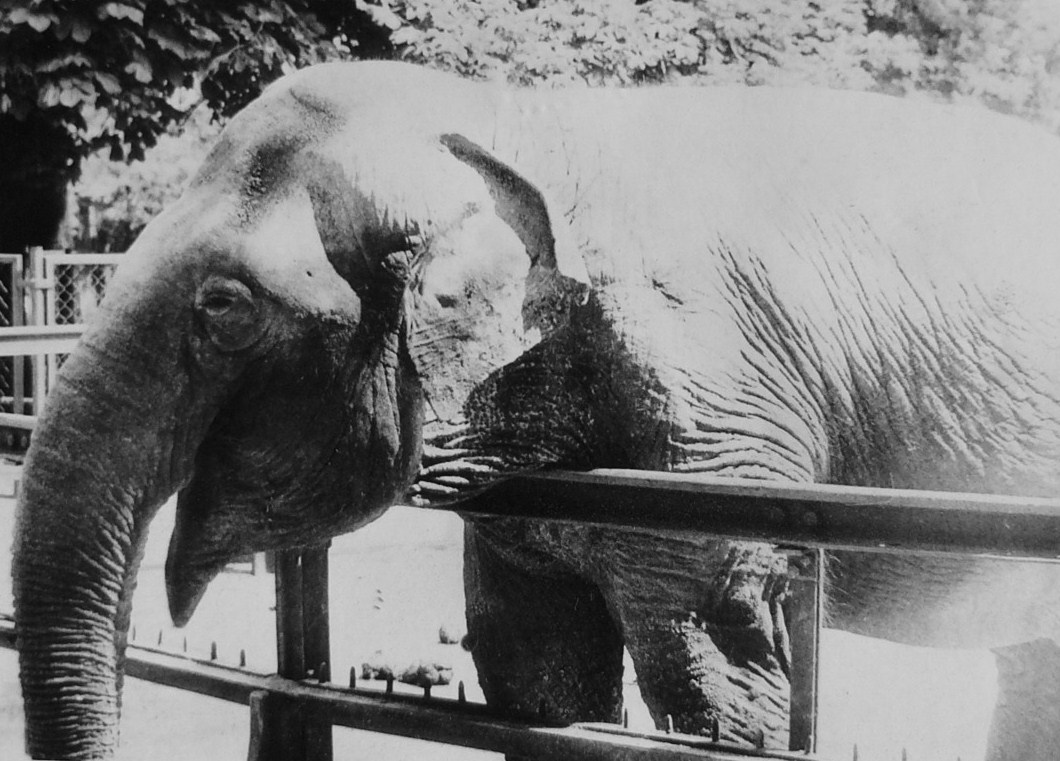
Elephant Kinga at the Poznań Zoo

After the end of World War I, the zoo experienced a period of decline and the number of visitors decreased. In 1919, when the Polish authorities took control of the zoo, it was in possession of just 243 animals of 74 species that survived the war including Indian elephants, emu, condor and African wild ass. Bolesław Cylkowski was appointed the new director of the Poznań Zoo and was assigned the difficult task of rebuilding and modernizing the zoo. In 1922, his successor Kazimierz Szczerkowski managed to restore the garden to its former glory. During the Interwar period, the zoo started to thrive and attract more and more visitors. Thanks to Szczerkowski's efforts the zoo joined the international Society for the Protection of the European Bison, which greatly contributed to saving this species from the brink of extinction. He also started collaborations with other zoological gardens from Poland and abroad. The zoo acquired new animals in 1923 such as lions, Bengal tiger, leopard and Malayan tapir, in 1924 polar bears, California sea lions, European bisons and in 1927 koniks. Upon the opening of the first State National Exhibition in 1929 (now the Poznań International Fair) a new pavilion and facilities were built, while other were adapted to new purposes. The zoo was visited by approximately 700,000 people during the Exhibition.

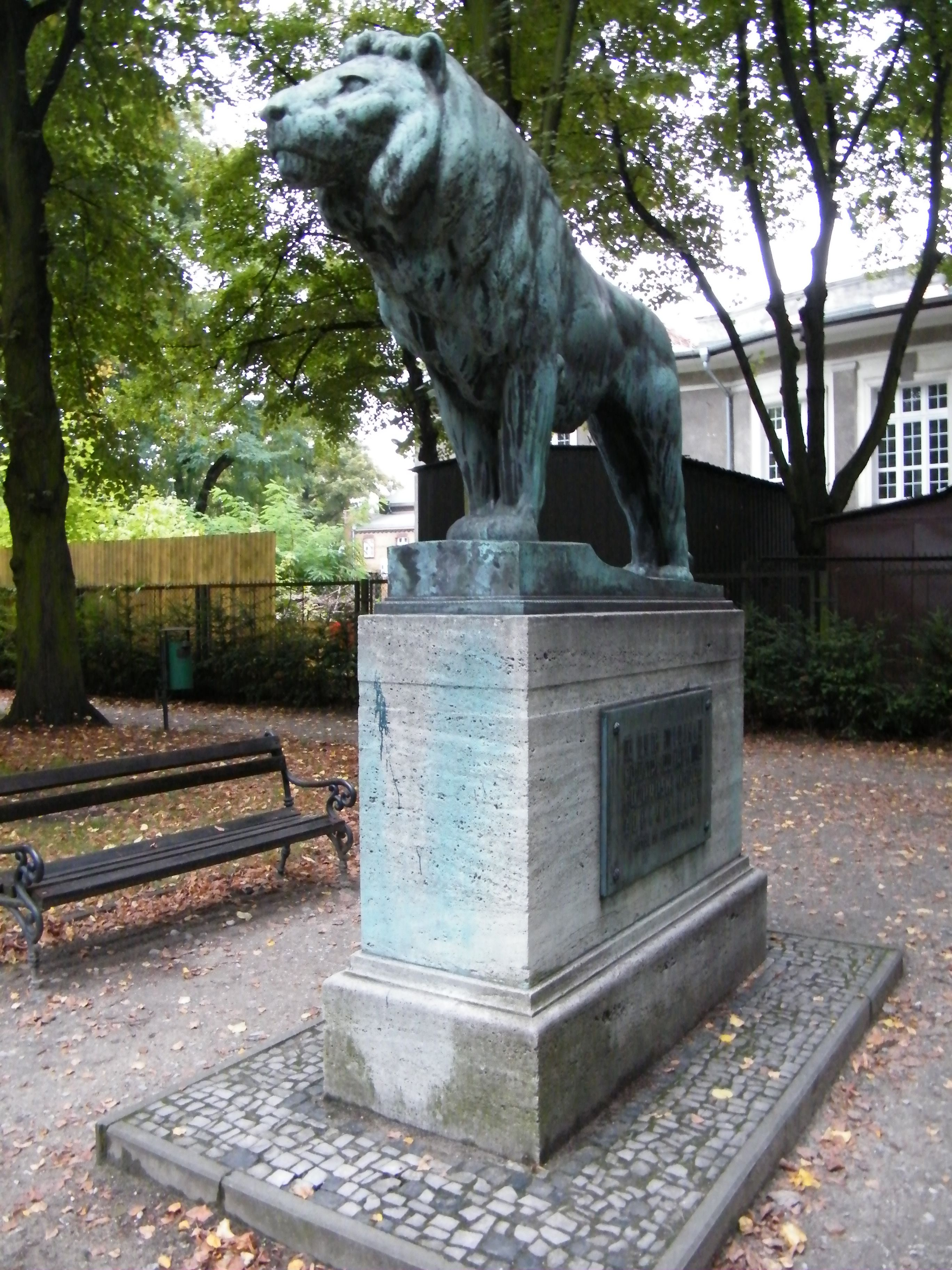
The Lion Monument

Before the start of World War II, the Poznań Zoo was home to 1184 animals representing 300 species. Only as few as 175 animals survived the war (e.g. wolves, deer and a hippopotamus) and many zoo buildings were destroyed. On 20 January 1945, Wiesław Rakowski was chosen as the director of the zoo. He was also the director of the Natural Museum which operated on the premises on the zoo. Many animals were transferred from other places to Poznań including Łódź, Leszno and the ruined Wrocław Zoo. In 1949, Rakowski was succeeded by Bolesław Witkowski who continued the renovation of the garden after the war. In 1955, Indian elephant named Kinga, one of the most popular and favourite animals in the history of the Poznań Zoo, was transported from Indochina. She died in 2003 after her 50th birth anniversary. In the 1960s, the complex underwent further development and numerous exhibitions and educational activities were launched. In 1974, the New Zoo in Poznań, located near Lake Malta and covering 120.6 hectares, was opened for larger, spacious areas for many of the Old Zoo's inhabitants. The opening of the New Zoo was followed by the construction of several new exhibits on its grounds, including an insectarium, a seal pond, a Japanese macaque enclosure, and a modernized children's zoo. Proposals originally called for the Old Zoo to be shut down as all of the larger animals would move out to the New Zoo, but in 1978 the proposal was scrapped and the Old Zoo was entered on the register of objects of cultural heritage. Additional funding was provided for further restoration of the Old Zoo's buildings. In 1985, the zoo's breeding program had its first major success as the first gibbon named Jurand was born in a Polish zoo. In November 1999, a white rhinoceros born at the zoo was the first of its species to be born in Poland.

In 2008, the Elephants' Pavilion was constructed. It is the biggest such pavilion in Poland and one of the most modern buildings of this kind in Europe. Since 10 January 2016, Elżbieta Zgrabczyńska has been serving as the director of the Poznań Zoological Garden. In the same year, a fox sanctuary was opened within the zoo's area. It shelters and protects foxes that have been rescued from animal farms. In the years 2015-2016 the building of the aviary was renovated and since 2017 visitors can see new exhibitions of red-handed tamarins and cotton-top tamarins.

== Directors ==
- Robert Jaeckel (1883–1907)
- Maksymilian Meissner (1907–1913)
- Hans Laackmann (1913–1918)
- Bolesław Cylkowski (1919–1922)
- Kazimierz Szczerkowski (1922–1940)
- R. Müller (1940–1945)
- Wiesław Rakowski (1945–1948)
- Bolesław Witkowski (1949–1968)
- Adam Taborski (1968–1982)
- Wincenty Falkowski (1982–1990)
- Jan Śmiełowski (1990–1994)
- Lech Banach (1994–2014)
- Aleksander Niweliński (2014–2015)
- Ewa Zgrabczyńska (2016–present)

== Conservation efforts ==
The Poznań Zoological Garden participates in European Endangered Species Programmes for red pandas, snow leopards, vicunas, and bearded vultures, and coordinates the EEP studbooks for dalmatian pelicans and pygmy slow lorises. Throughout their history, they also participated in conservation programs involving the Eurasian lynx, Eurasian eagle owl, and golden eagle

== Gallery ==
The gallery features animals housed both in the Old Zoo and New Zoo areas of the Poznań Zoological Garden.

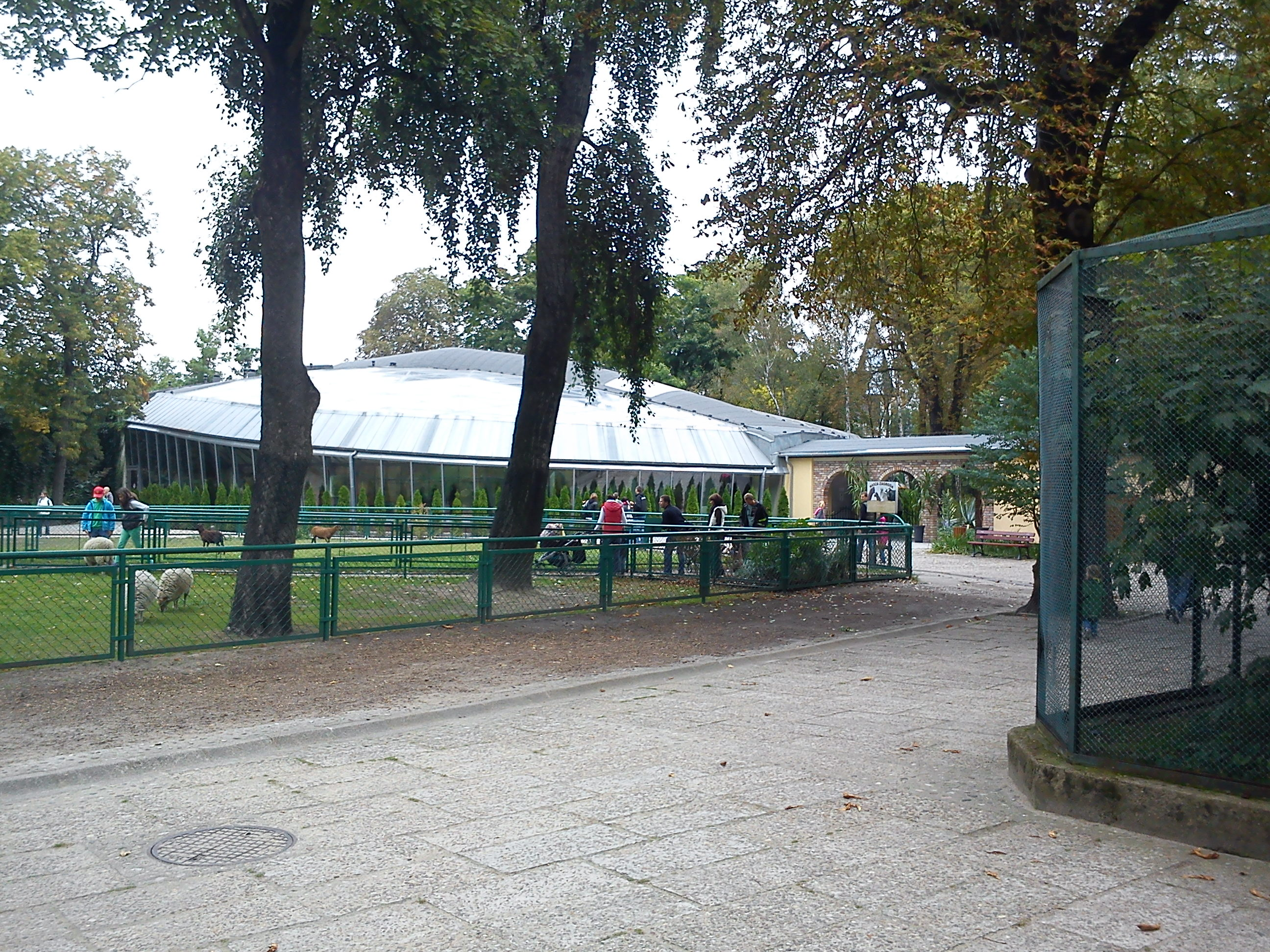
Warm-Blooded Animals' Pavilion

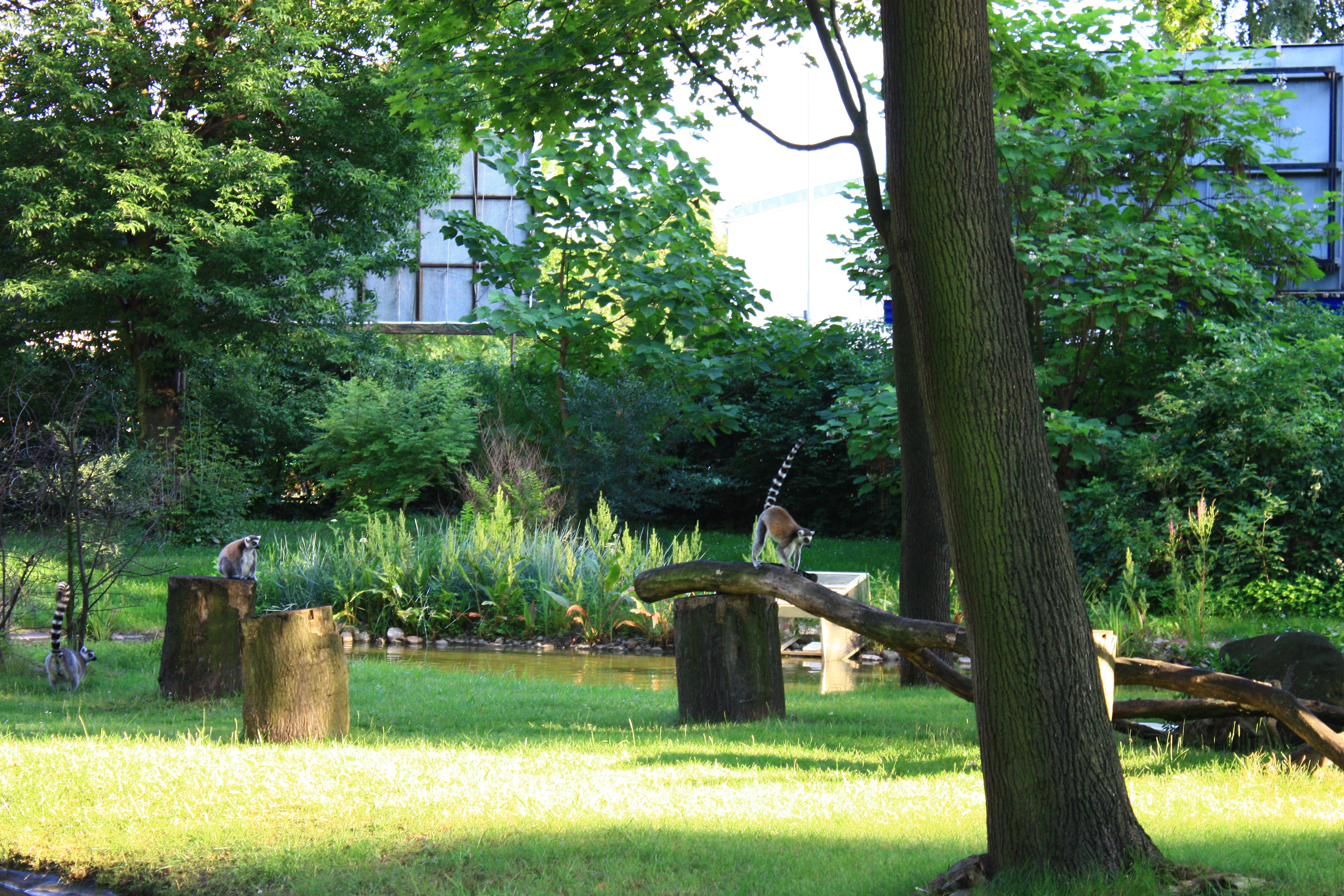
The Lemurs' Island

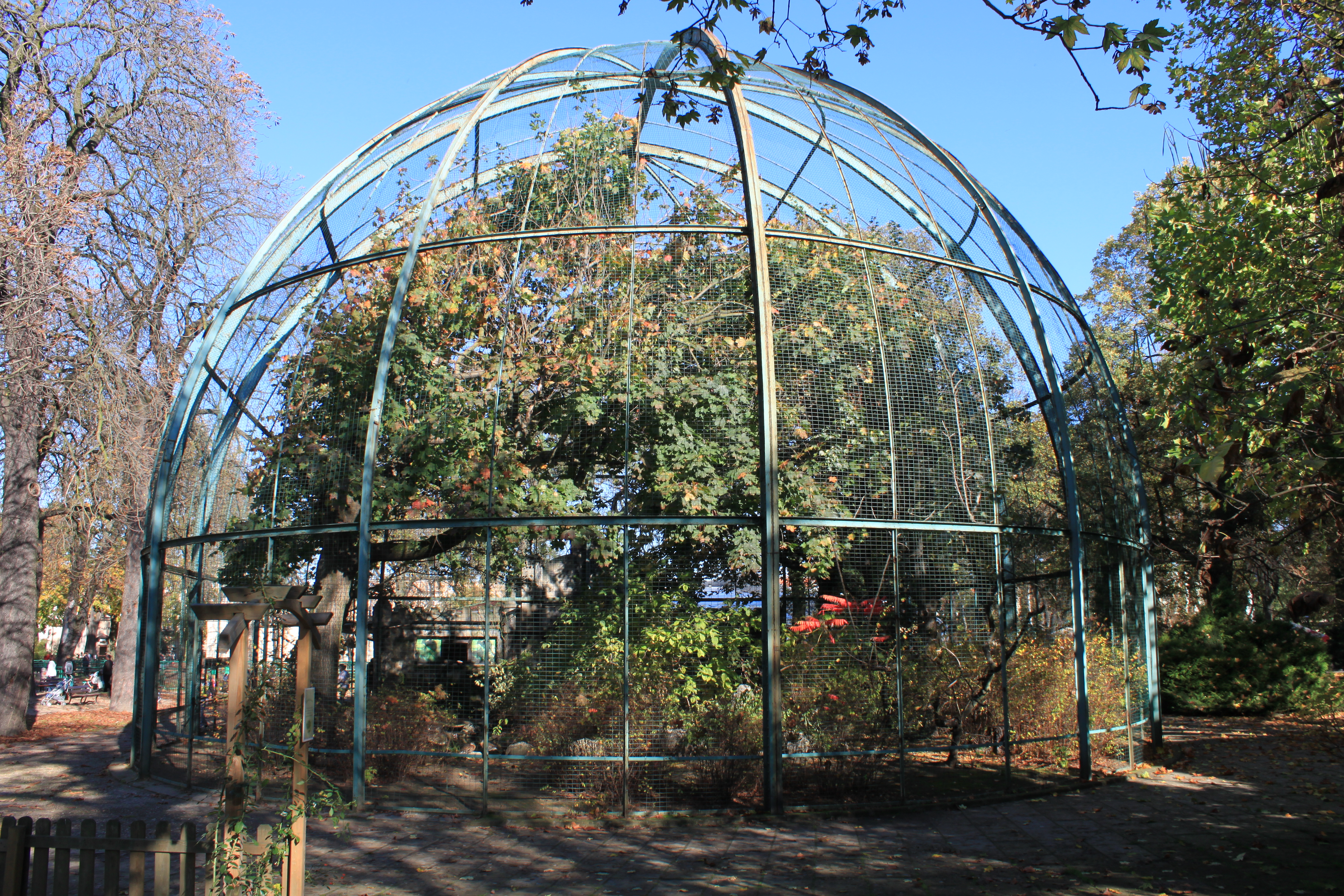
A historic aviary built in 1924

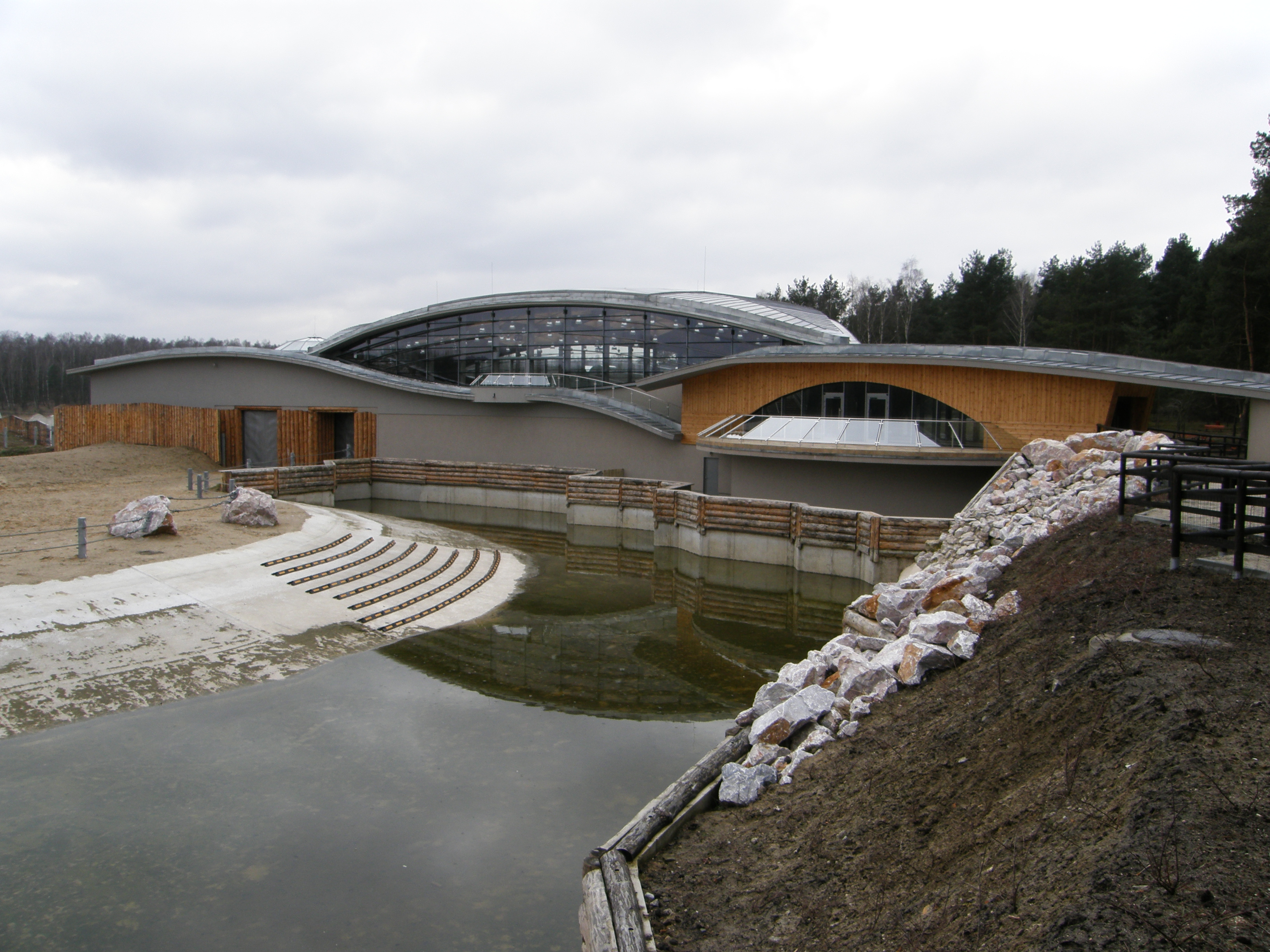
Elephants' Pavilion at the New Zoo

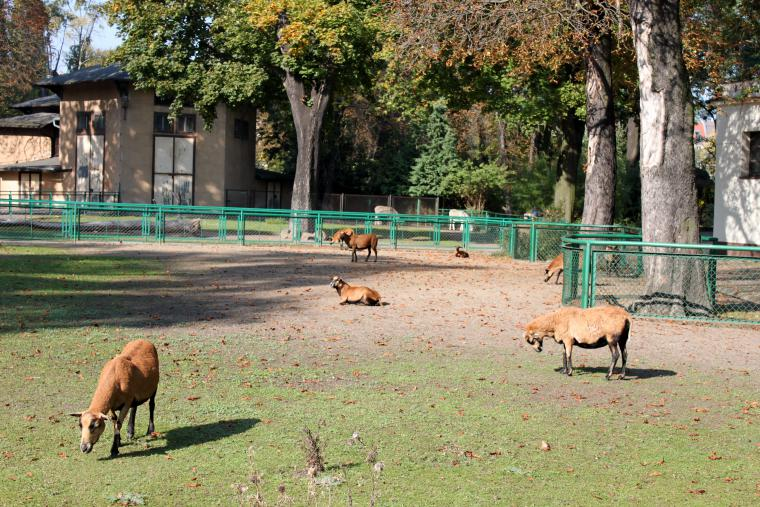
Cameroon sheep enclosure

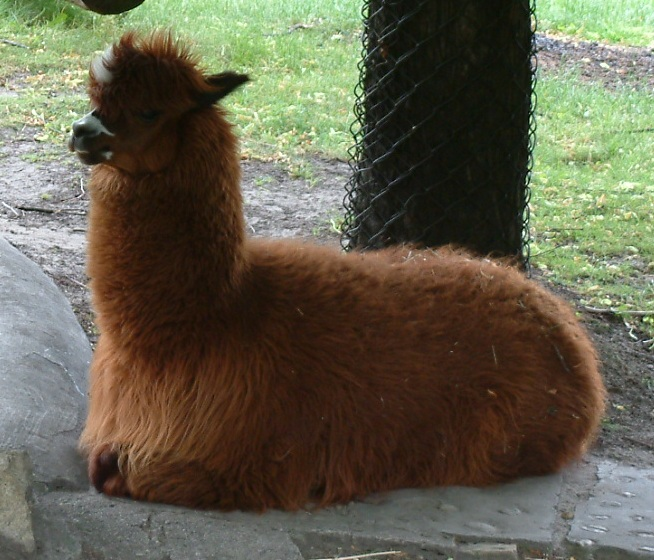
Alpaca

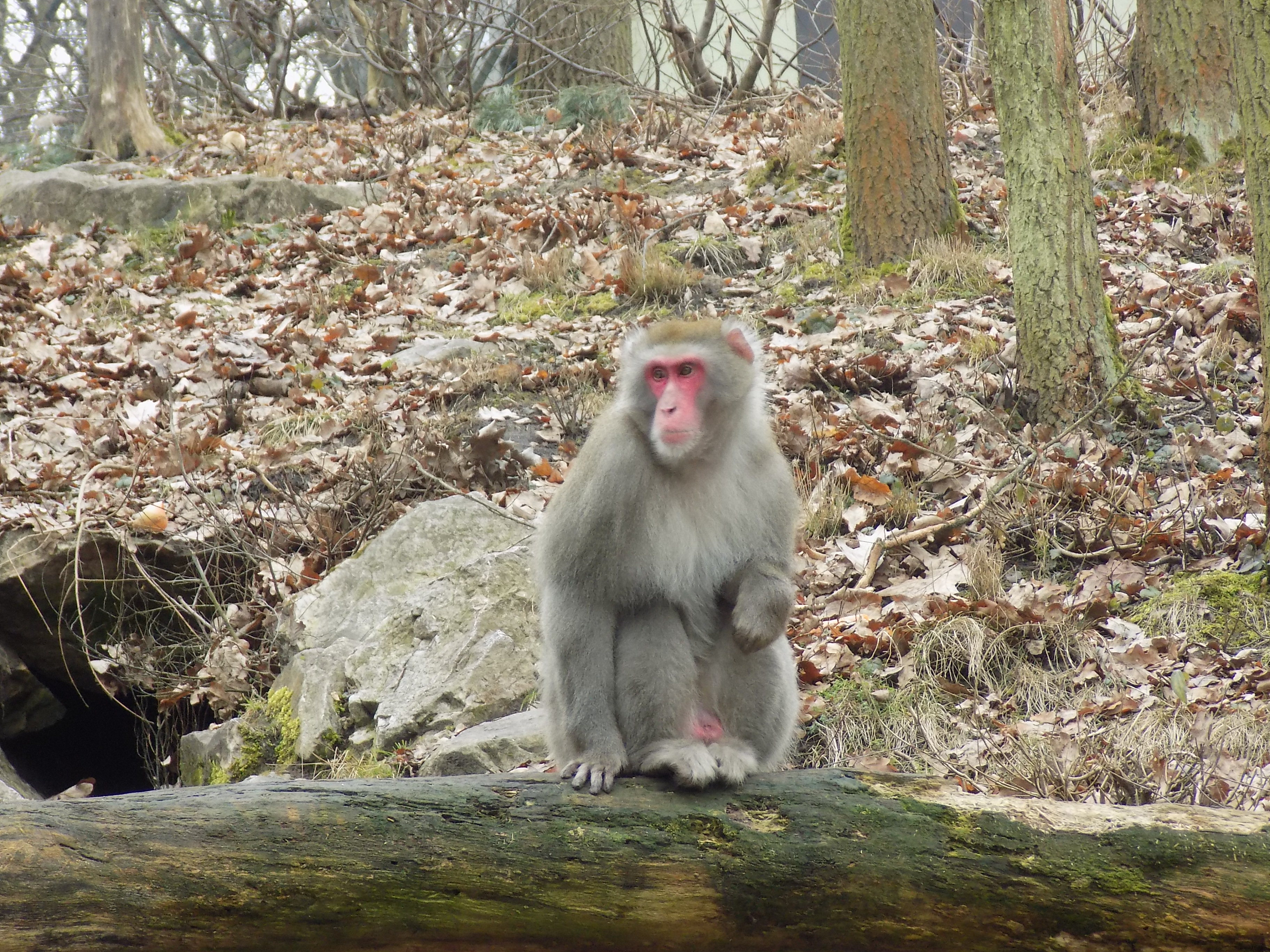
Japanese macaque

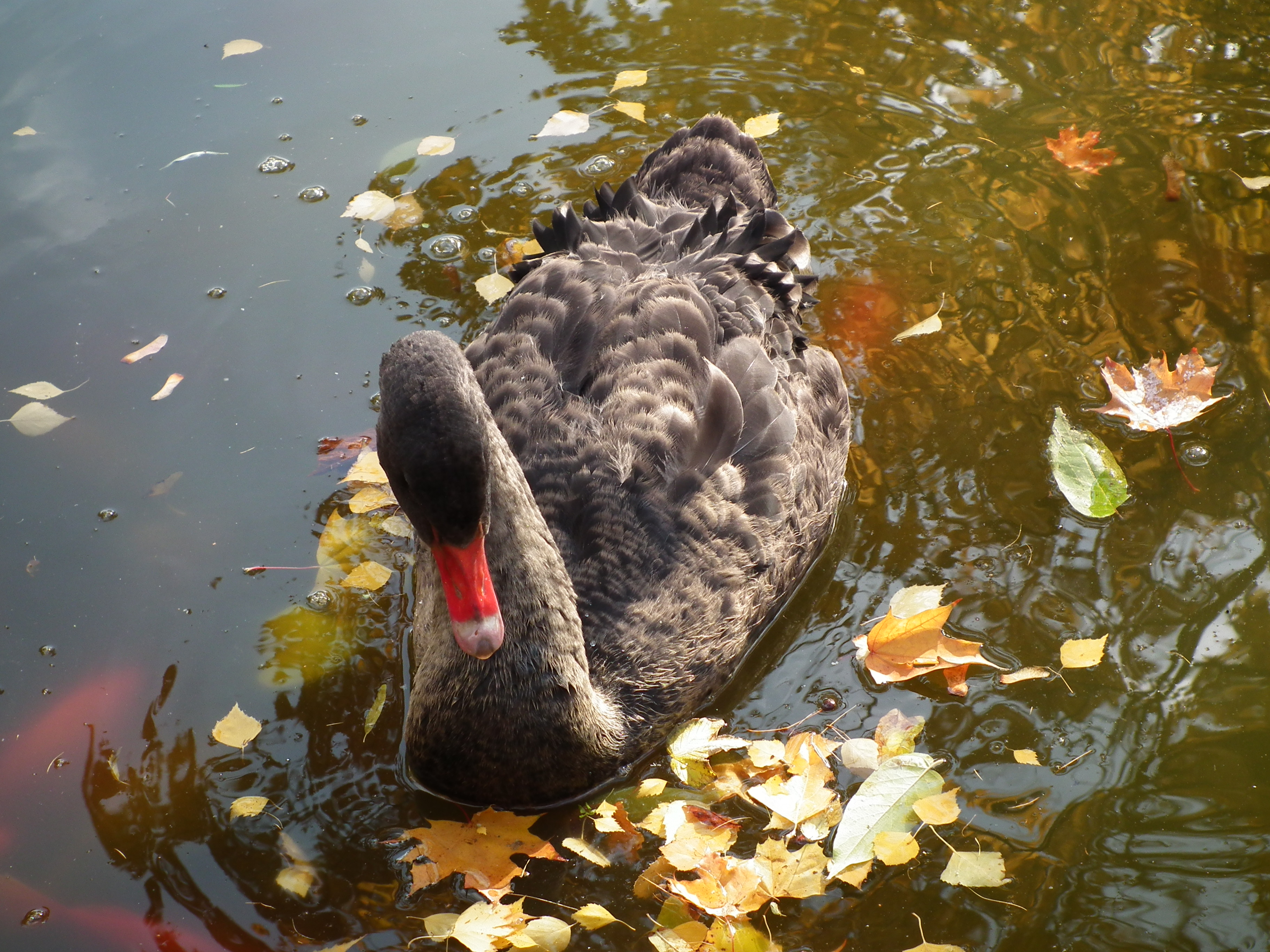
Black swan

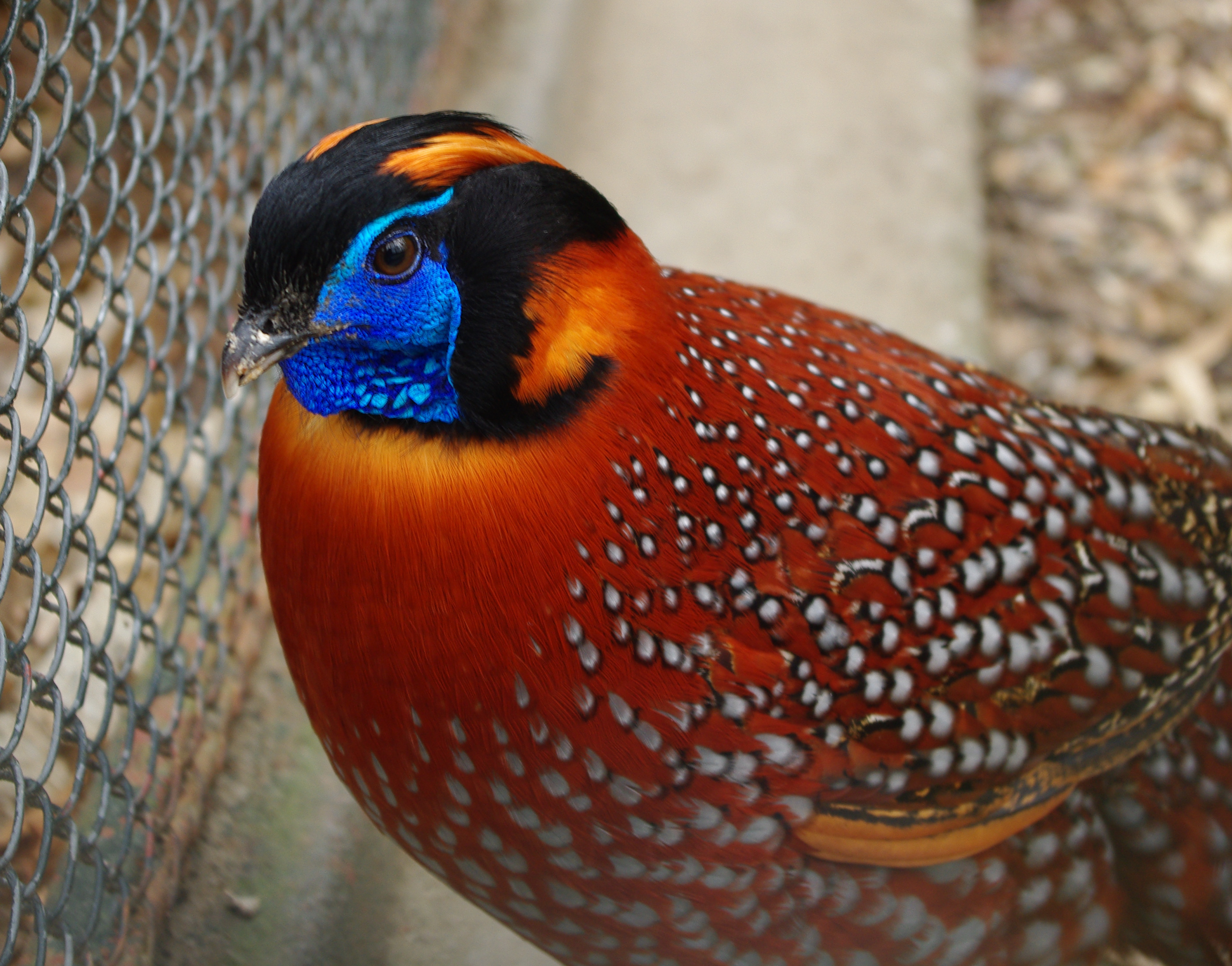
Temminck's tragopan

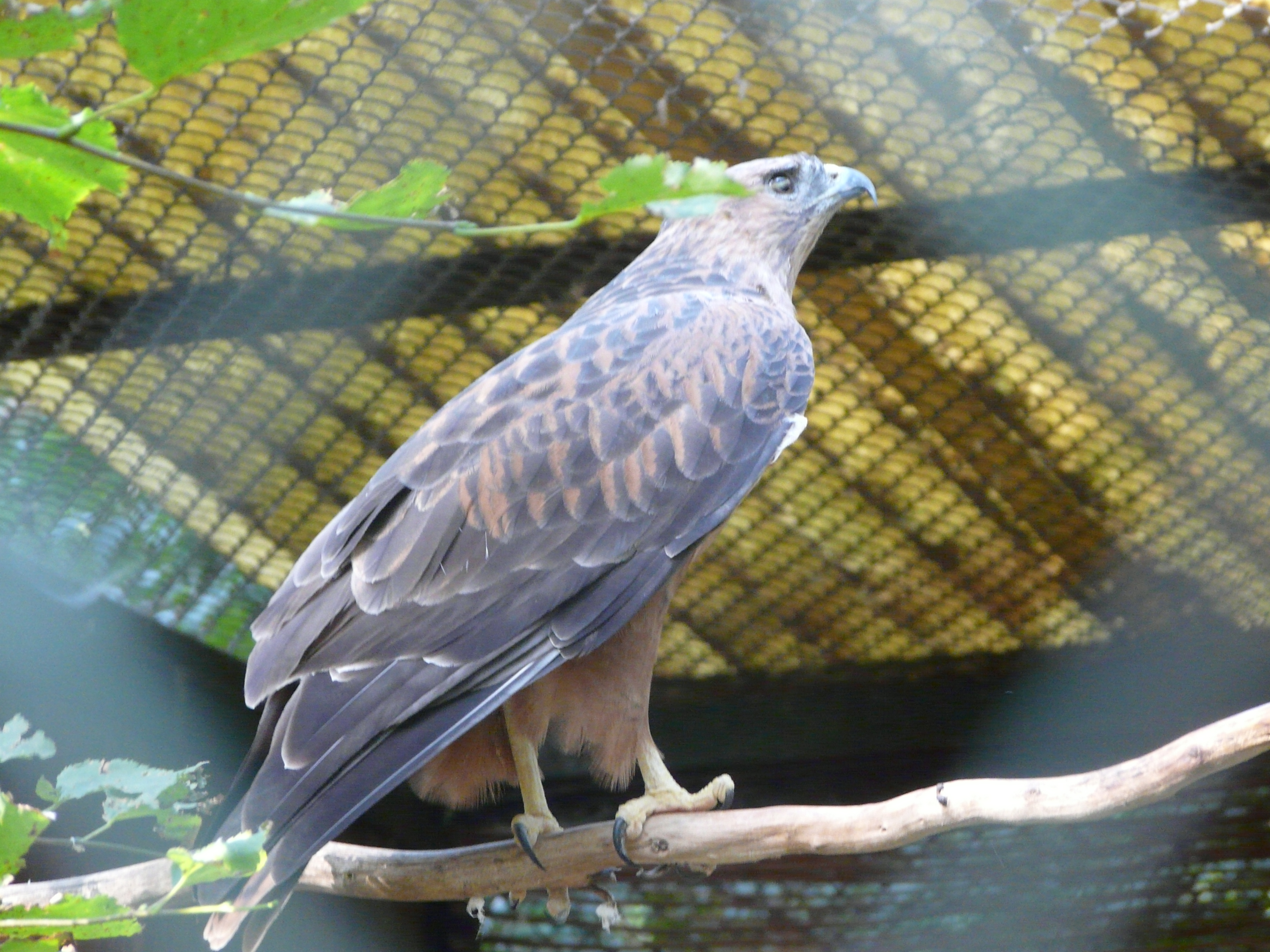
Common buzzard

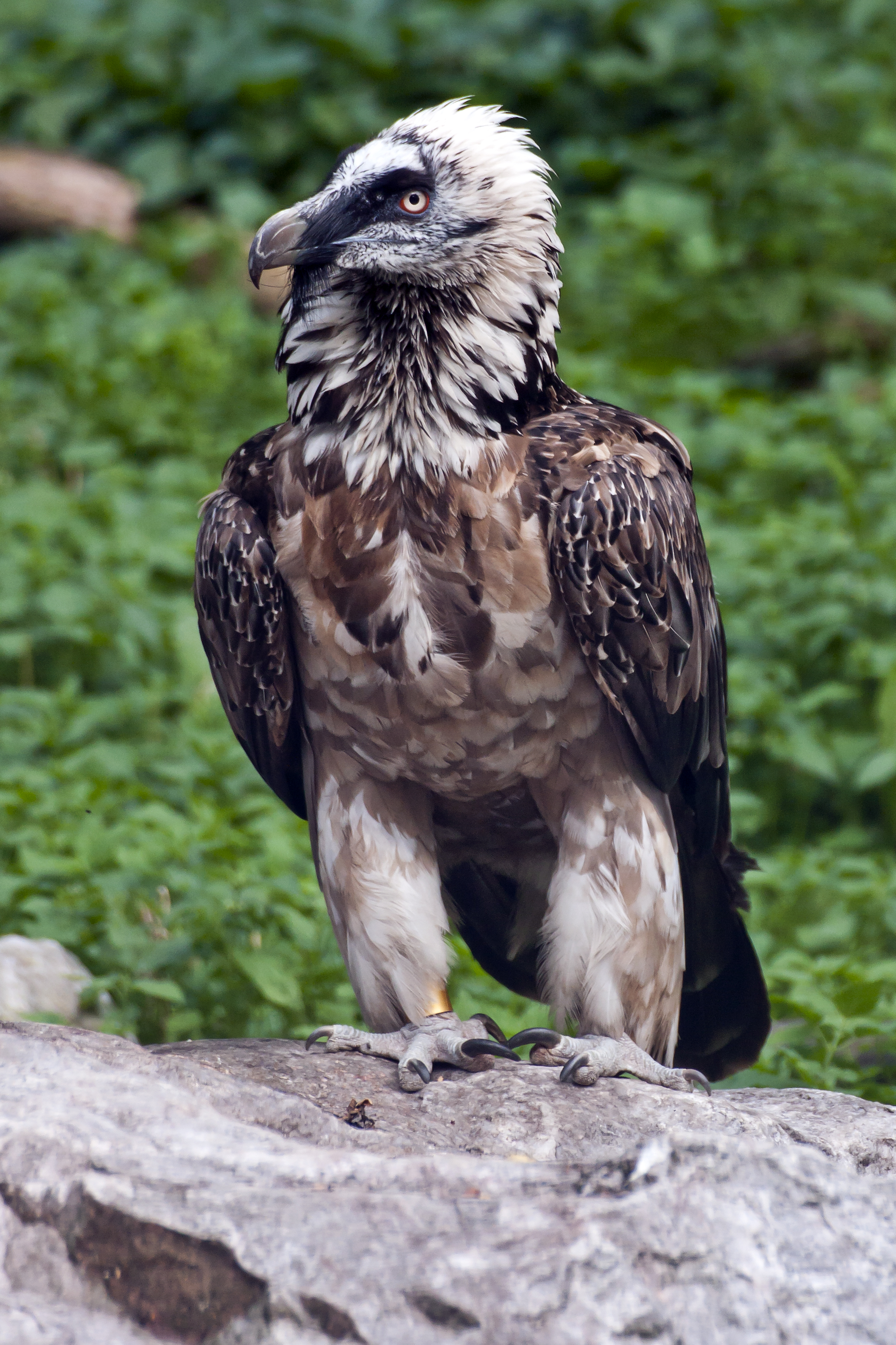
Bearded vulture

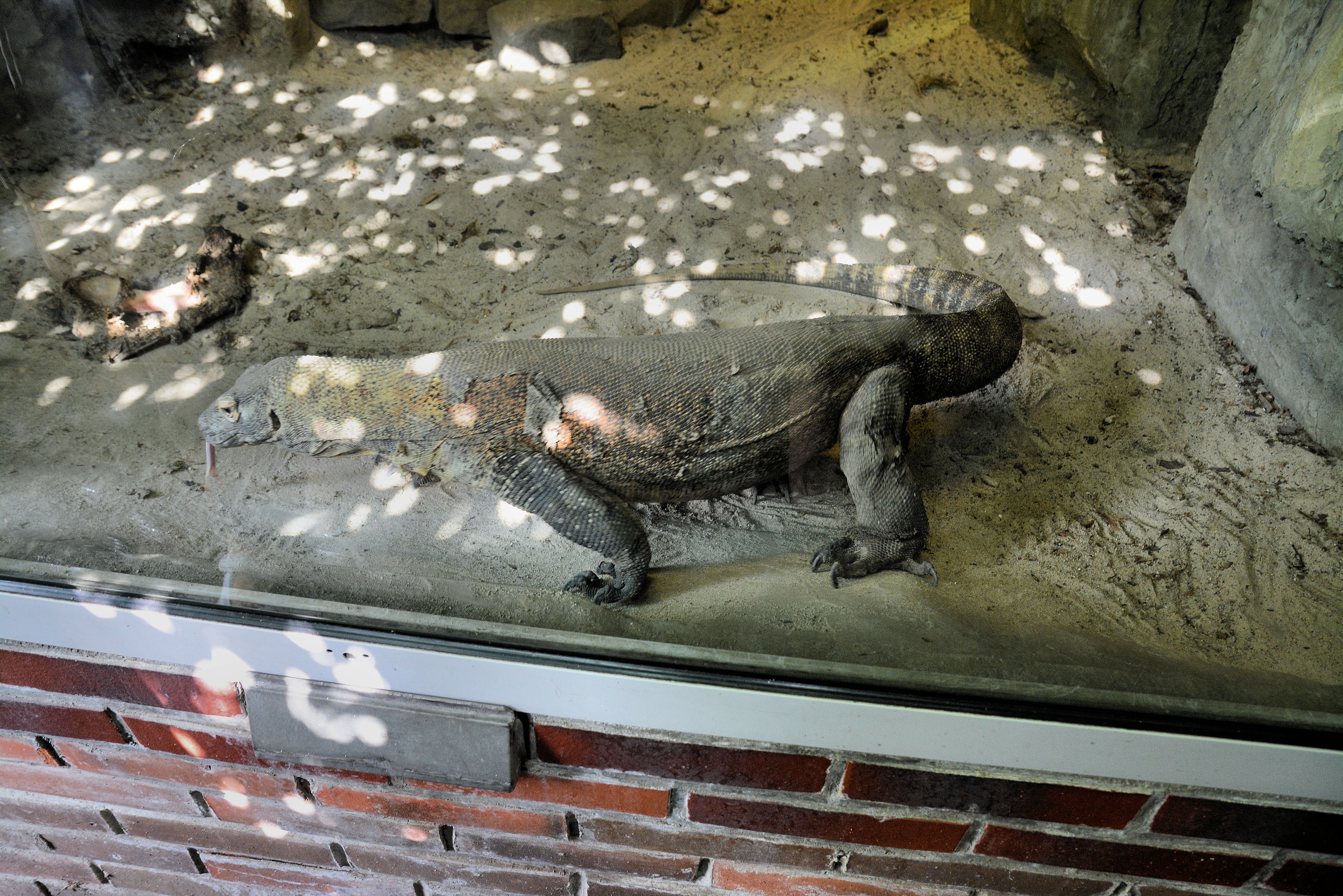
Komodo dragon

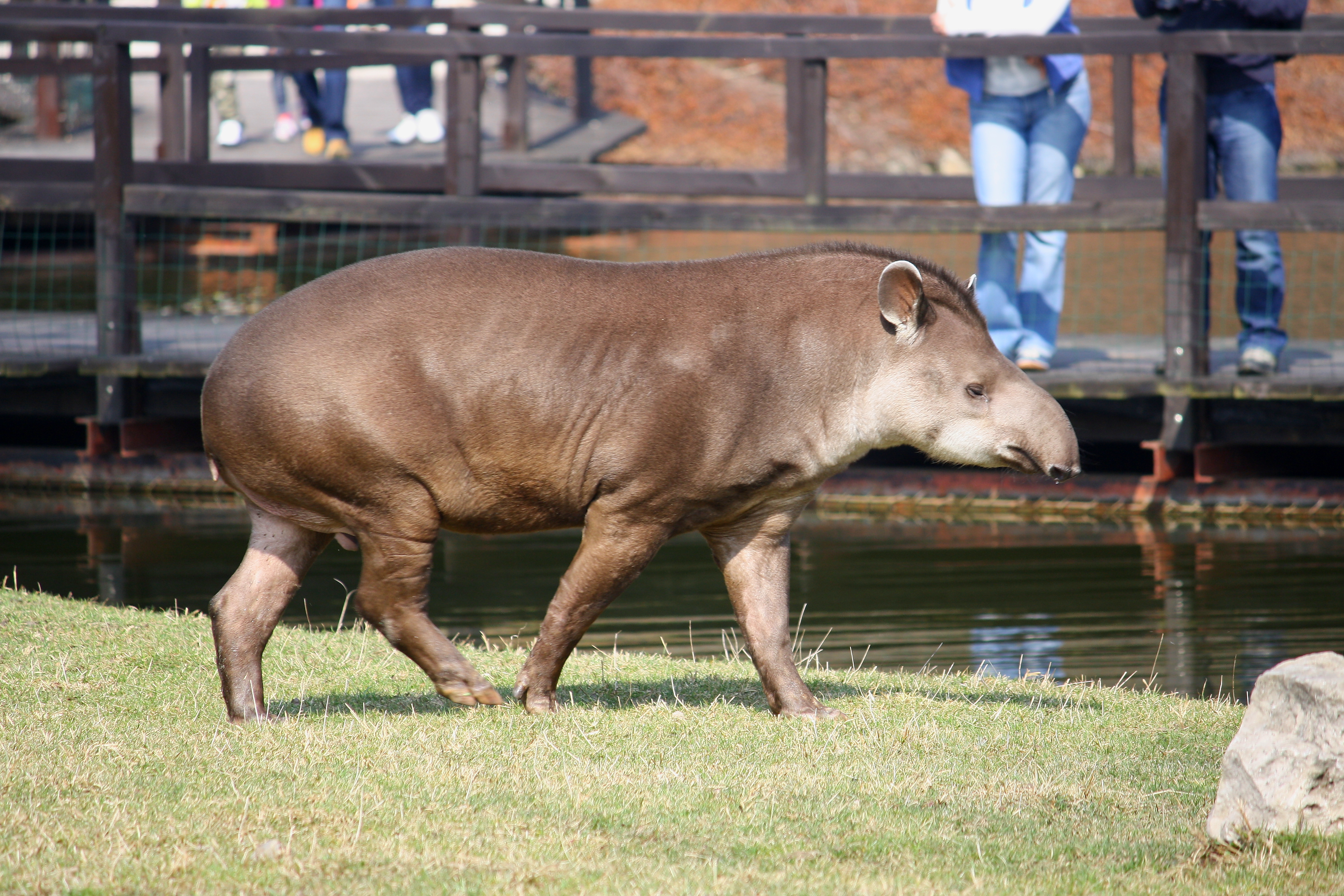
South American tapir

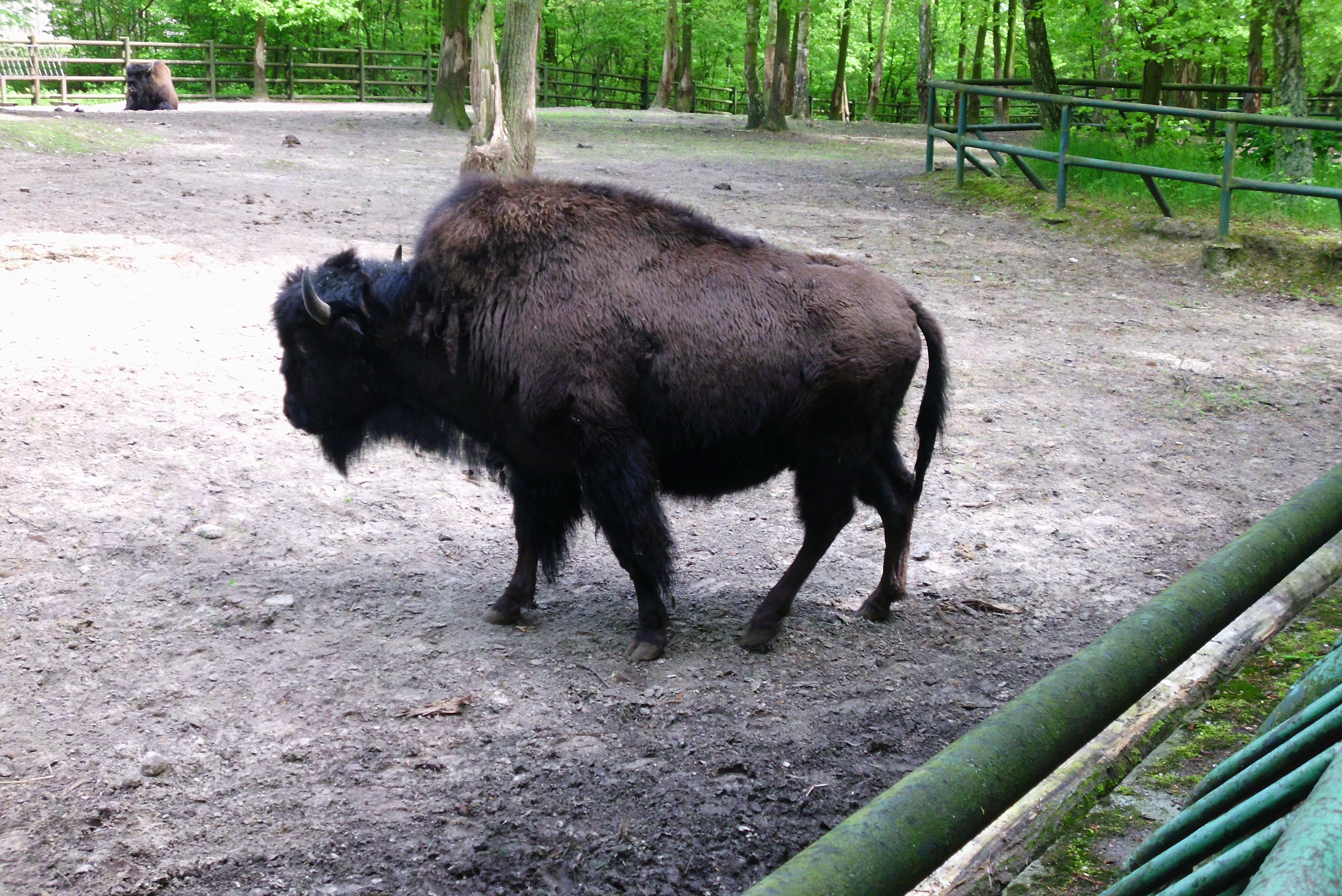
European bison

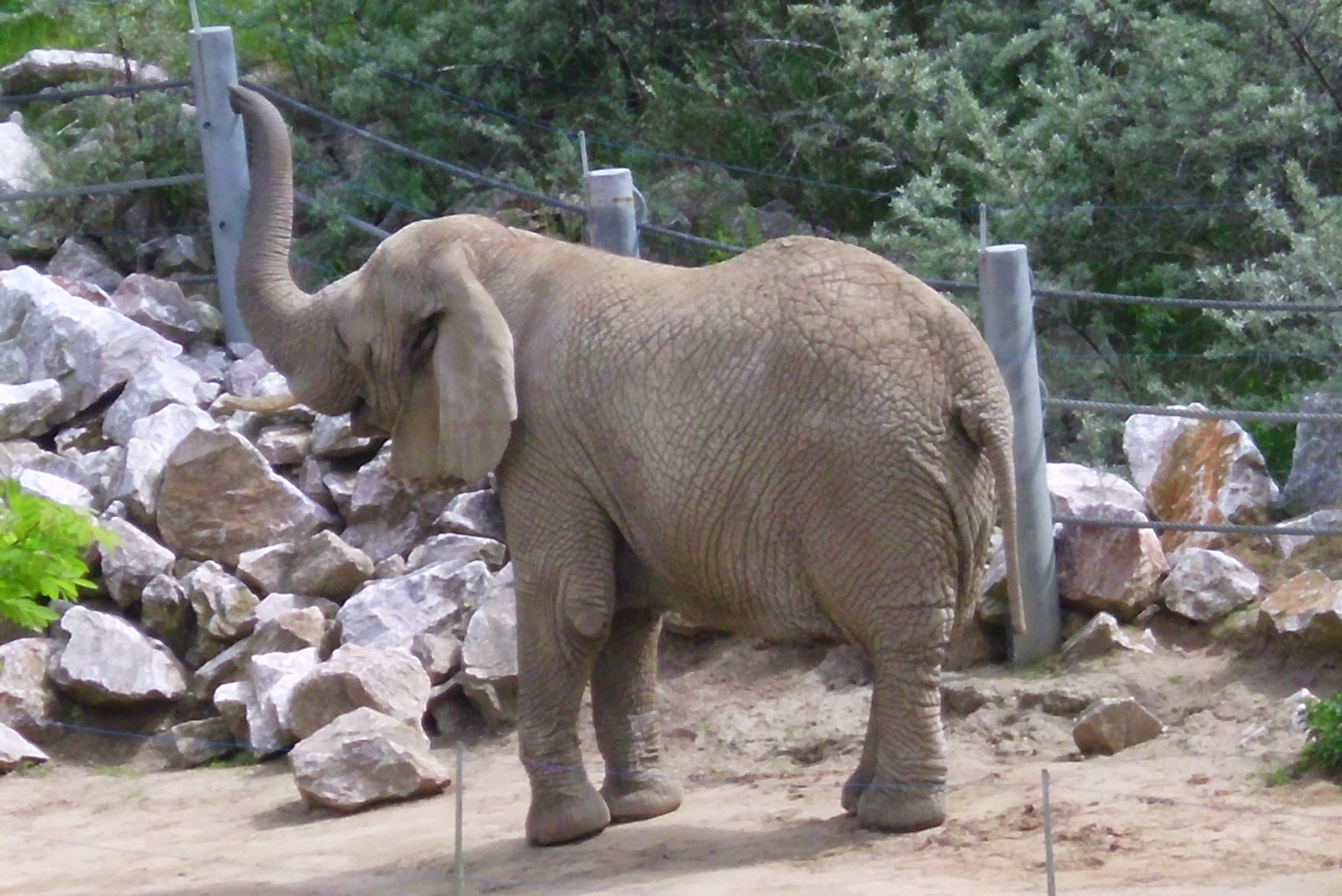
Elephant

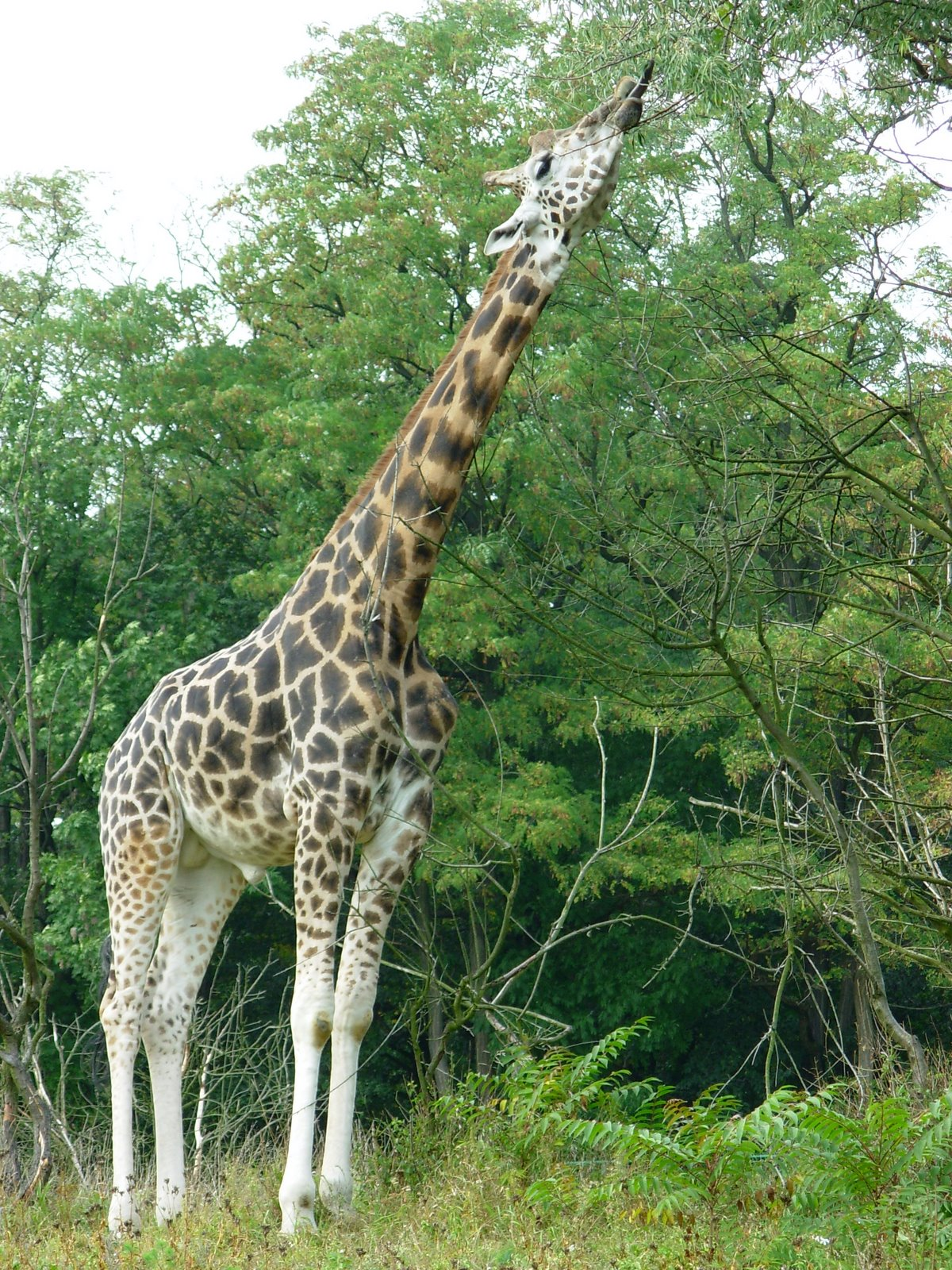
Northern giraffe

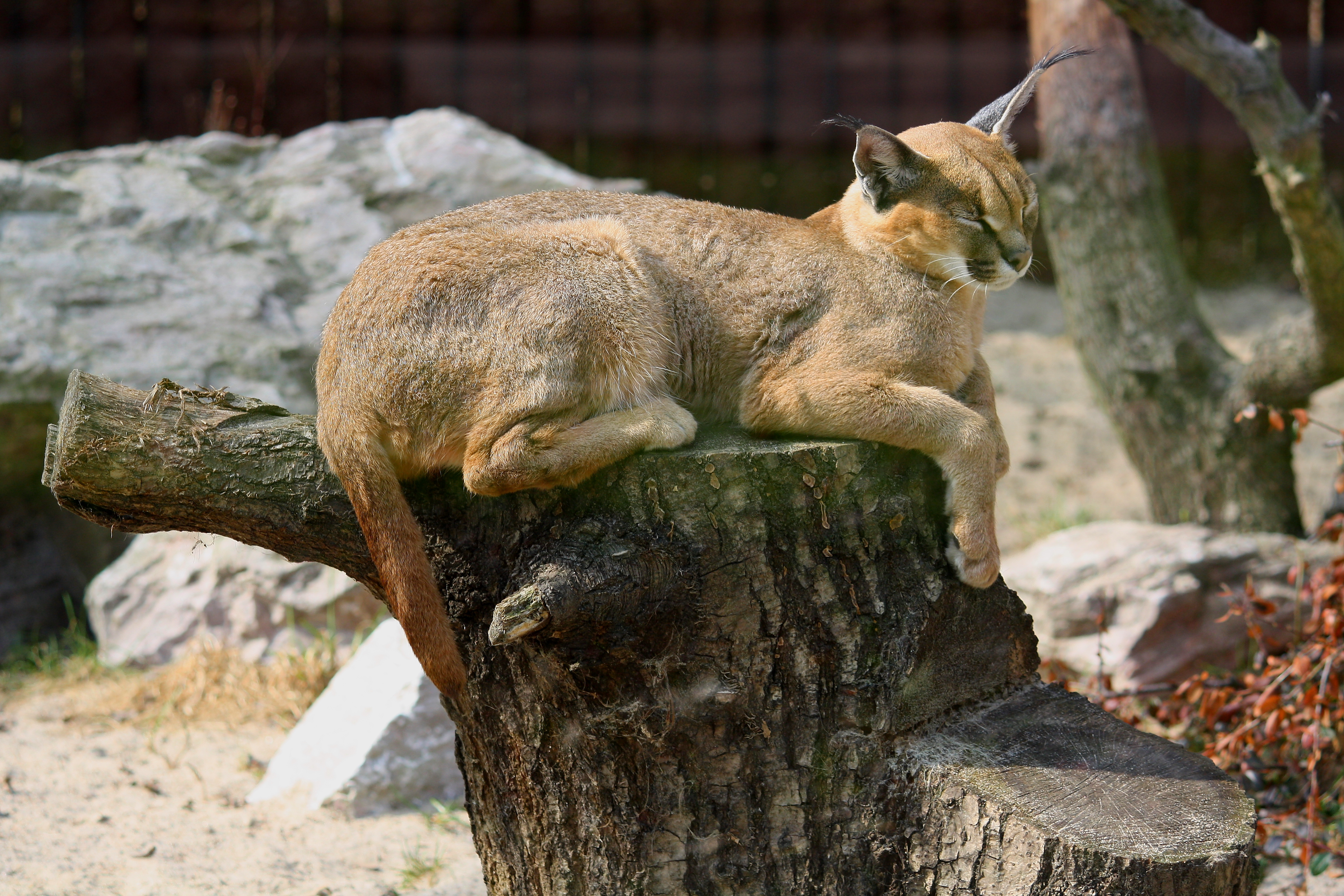
Caracal

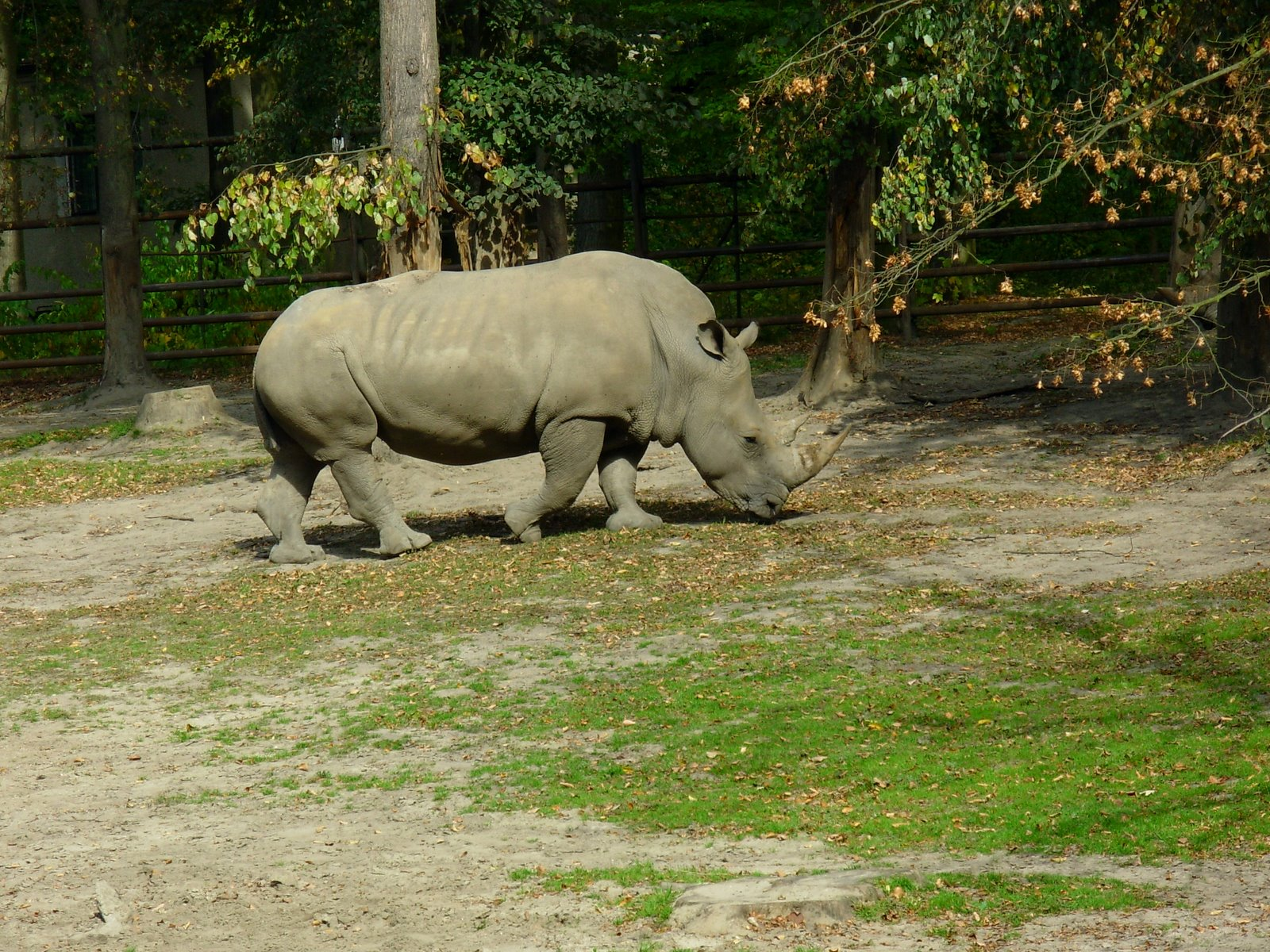
White rhinoceros

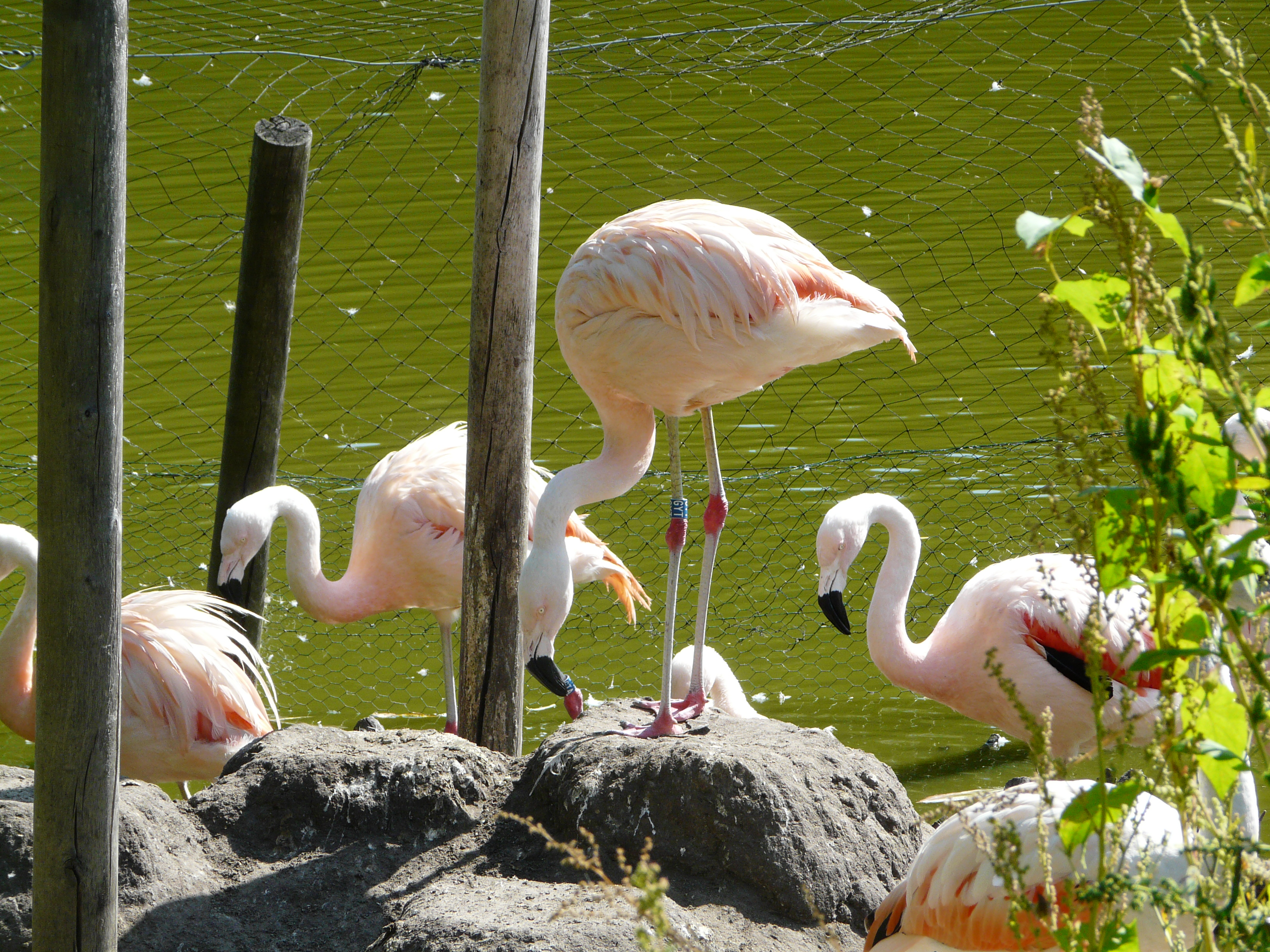
Chilean flamingoes

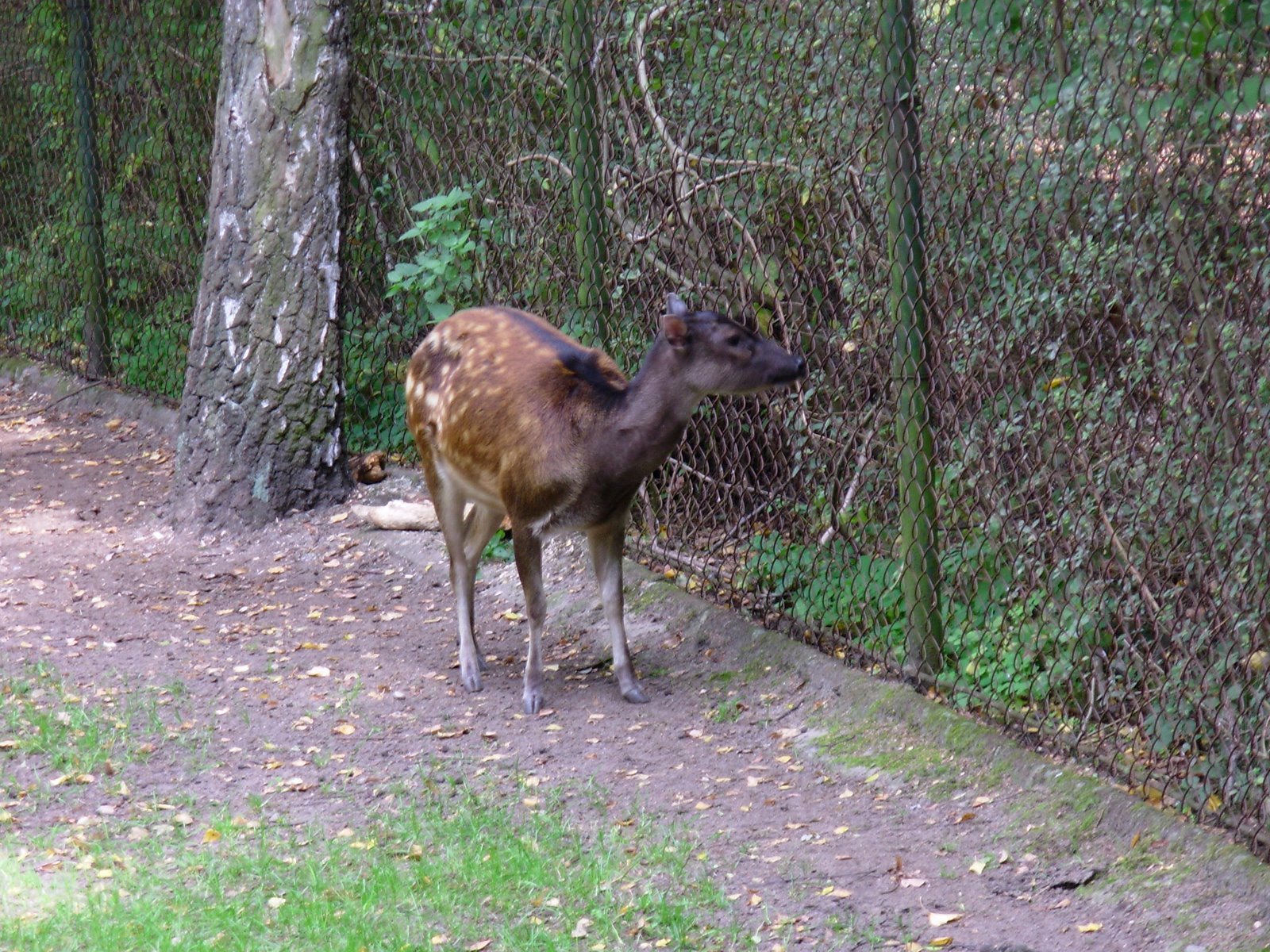
Visayan spotted deer

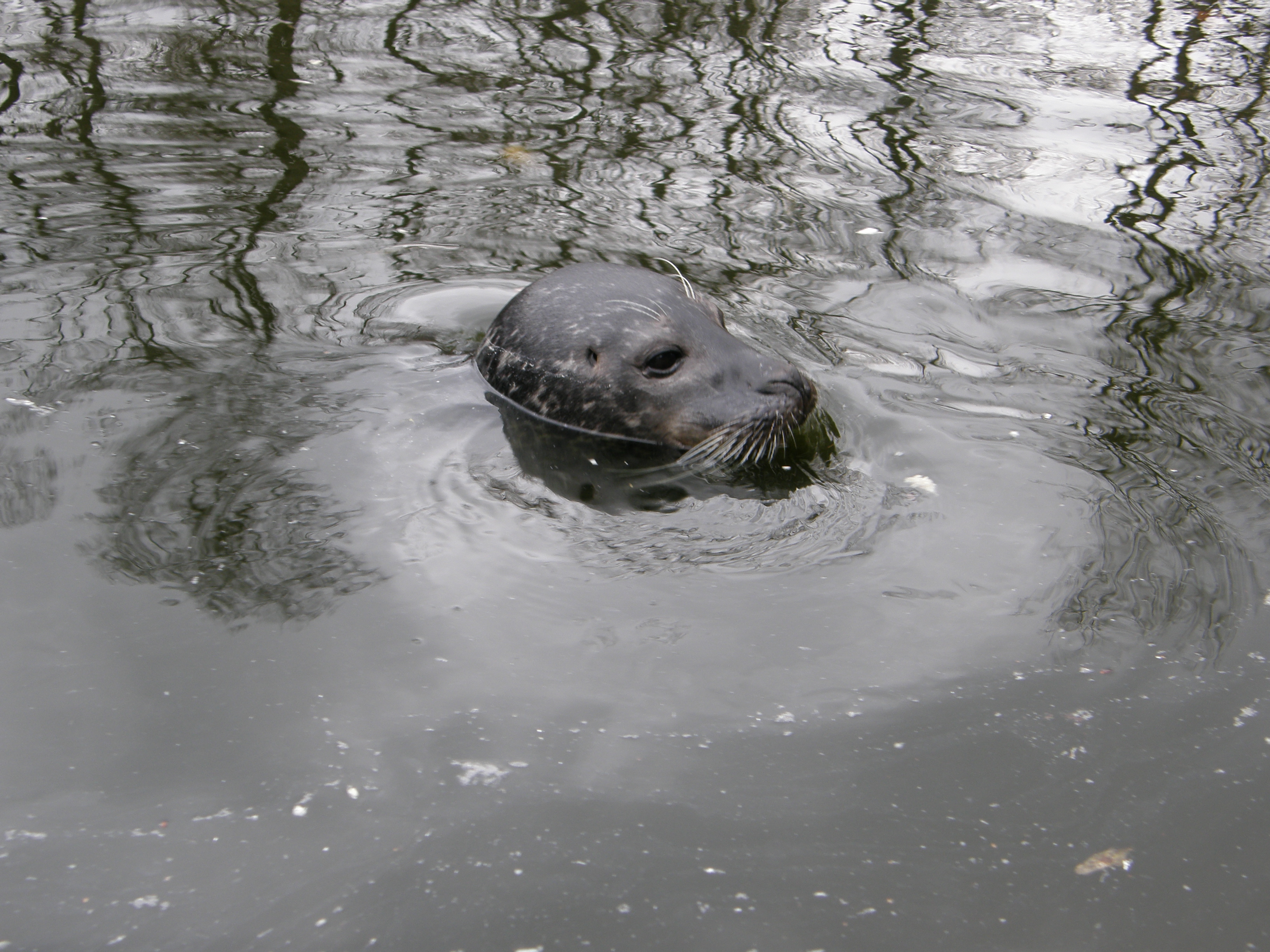
Common seal
