= SPEB =

SPEB may refer to:

- Society for the Protection of the European Bison
- Spermidine biosynthesis B, an enzyme in E. coli
- Streptococcal pyrogenic exotoxin B or streptopain, an enzyme in S. pyogenes
