= Wawrzyniec Benzelstjerna Engeström =

Polish activist and poet

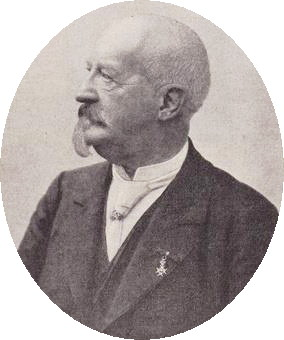
- Wawrzyniec Benzelstjerna Engeström, 1910
- Born: 8 May 1829; Poznań
- Died: 22 October 1910 (aged 81); Gryżyna
- Occupations: Poet, publisher, activist
- Spouse: Jadwiga Borzewska (m. 1852)
- Writing career
- Language: Polish
- Period: 19th century

Wawrzyniec Benzelstjerna Engeström (1829–1910) was a Polish activist, poet, translator and notable advocate of Polish–Swedish cooperation.

== Early life ==
He was the son of General Stanislaus von Engeström and grandson of the diplomat Count Lars von Engeström.

He took part in the Kraków uprising of 1846 and Greater Poland Uprising of 1848, and was imprisoned by the Prussians for one year in Kostrzyn nad Odrą for the participation in the latter. In 1850, he studied in Wrocław, where he engaged in youth cultural activities.

== Adulthood ==
After marriage in 1852, he returned to his family estate in Ostrowieczko. In 1853, he moved to Ugoszcz. In 1856, he bought the Rakowo estate.

In 1863, he moved to Warsaw and then to Lwów, where he organized a press office on behalf of the Polish National Government during the January Uprising. He published political brochures in Polish and French, and was arrested by the Austrians in July 1863. Thanks to the efforts of his Swedish family, he was released in mid-1864, and then he moved to Dresden, where he founded the Society for the Assistance of Emigrants, organized lectures on Polish history and literature for Polish refugees, and founded the Notatki Drezdeńskie Polish newspaper. He also befriended Józef Ignacy Kraszewski there. In 1877, he sold his Rakowo estate as he was prohibited from returning to the Russian Partition of Poland.

In 1878, he moved to Poznań. From 1880 to 1906, he was a secretary of the Poznań Society of Friends of Learning. He co-founded the Działyński Palace fine arts collection, and initiated the construction of a monument to Renaissance poet Jan Kochanowski in Poznań.

== Bibliography ==
- Budrewicz, Tadeusz (2020). "Śladem "Pieśni o ziemi naszej". Poematy Wawrzyńca Engeströma". Ruch Literacki (in Polish). No. 3 (360). p. 39. ISSN 0035-9602.
