= Ugoszcz, Kuyavian-Pomeranian Voivodeship =

Ugoszcz
- Village
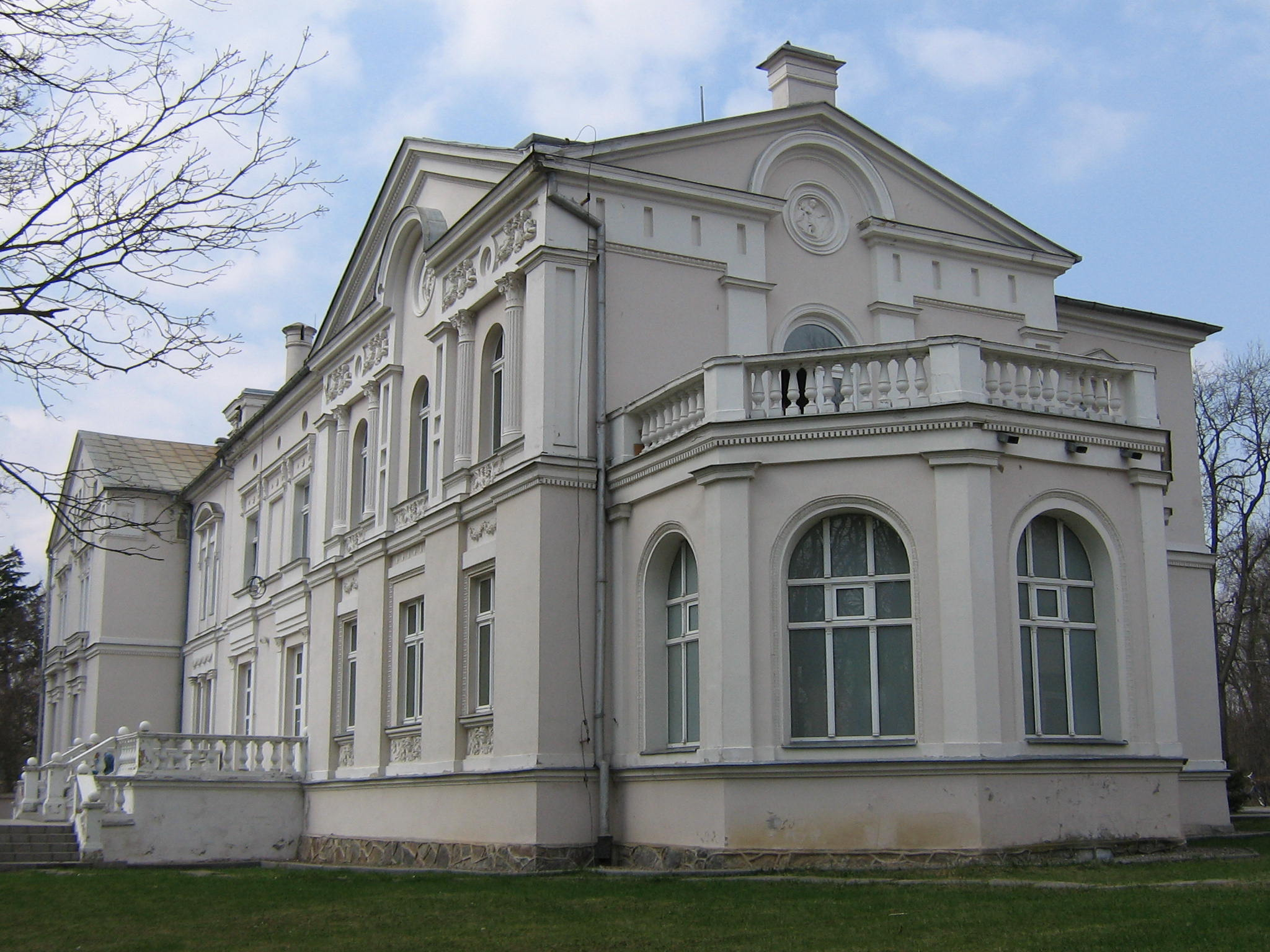
- Borzewski Palace in Ugoszcz

- Location within Poland
- Coordinates: 53°3′N 19°14′E
- Country: Poland
- Voivodeship: Kuyavian-Pomeranian
- County: Rypin
- Gmina: Brzuze
- Time zone: UTC+1 (CET)
  - Summer (DST): UTC+2 (CEST)
- Vehicle registration: CRY

Ugoszcz [ˈuɡɔʂt͡ʂ] is a village in the administrative district of Gmina Brzuze, within Rypin County, Kuyavian-Pomeranian Voivodeship, in north-central Poland. It is located on the northern shore of Lake Ugoszcz in the historic Dobrzyń Land.

== History ==
Ugoszcz was a private village of Polish nobility, including the Zieliński and Borzewski families, and its landmark is the Borzewski Palace. In 1827, the village had a population of 349. Poet and activist Wawrzyniec Benzelstjerna Engeström lived in the village from 1853 to 1856.
