= Stanislaus von Engeström =

Count and Baron Gustaf Stanislaus von Engeström
- Gustaw Stanisław Engeström
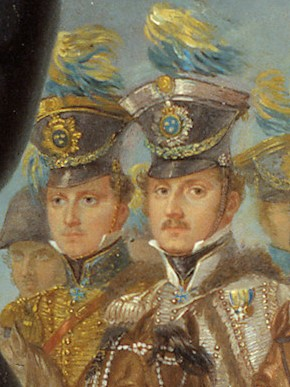
- Von Engeström (left) at the Battle of Leipzig (1813) by Fredric Westin

Personal details
- Born: 28 July 1791
- Died: 14 October 1850 (aged 59)
- Spouses: Augusta V. von Bardeleben (m. 1818; div. 1825); Leocadja O. von Gajewska (m. 1828)
- Children: Lars Stanislaus Edmund (1819-1871); Rosalie Dorotea Albertina (1824-1827); Lars Benzelstierna von Engeström (1829-1910)
- Parent(s): Lars von Engeström; Rosalie Drya-Chiapowska
- Awards: Order of the Sword; Pour le Mérite; För tapperhet i fält

Military service
- Allegiance: Sweden (Kingdom of Prussia) Prussia; Russia
- Years of service: 1808 - 1850
- Rank: Major general
- Battles/wars: Napoleonic Wars; Battle of Großbeeren; Battle of Dennewitz; Battle of Leipzig

Gustaf Stanislaus von Engeström, (Swedish: Gustaf Stanislaus Benzelstierna von Engeström; Polish: Gustaw Stanisław Benzelstierna Engeström; Russian: Станислав Лаврентьевич Энгестрём, romanized: Stanislav Lavrentievich Engeström; 28 July 1791 – 14 October 1850), he was the son of the Swedish diplomat and statesmen Lars von Engeström and his wife Rosalie Drya-Chiapowska. He started his military career as a Cornet in the Life Guards of Horse regiment in 1808. The very next year he was named a Lieutenant in the same regiment. In 1810 he was named Chamberlain at court of Charles XIII. In 1812 he became a Rittmeister and later the same year a Staff officer.

Stanislaus took part in the Battle of Leipzig in 1813 as an adjutant to Field Marshal Gebhard von Blücher, and was subsequently awarded with the prussian Pour le Mérite for his actions during the battle. He was also awarded the Swedish Order of the Sword and the För tapperhet i fält medal for it.

In 1814 he became a Major in the Smålands Regiment. He became a brigadier at the Swedish generalstaff in 1816. He was dismissed from his post in 1817 and soon entered into prussian and later Russian service. He died in 1850 having achieved the rank of Major general in the Russian army.

== Gallery ==
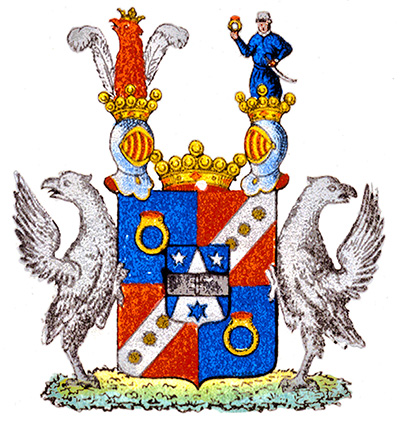
Coat of Arms of the noble family von Engeström.

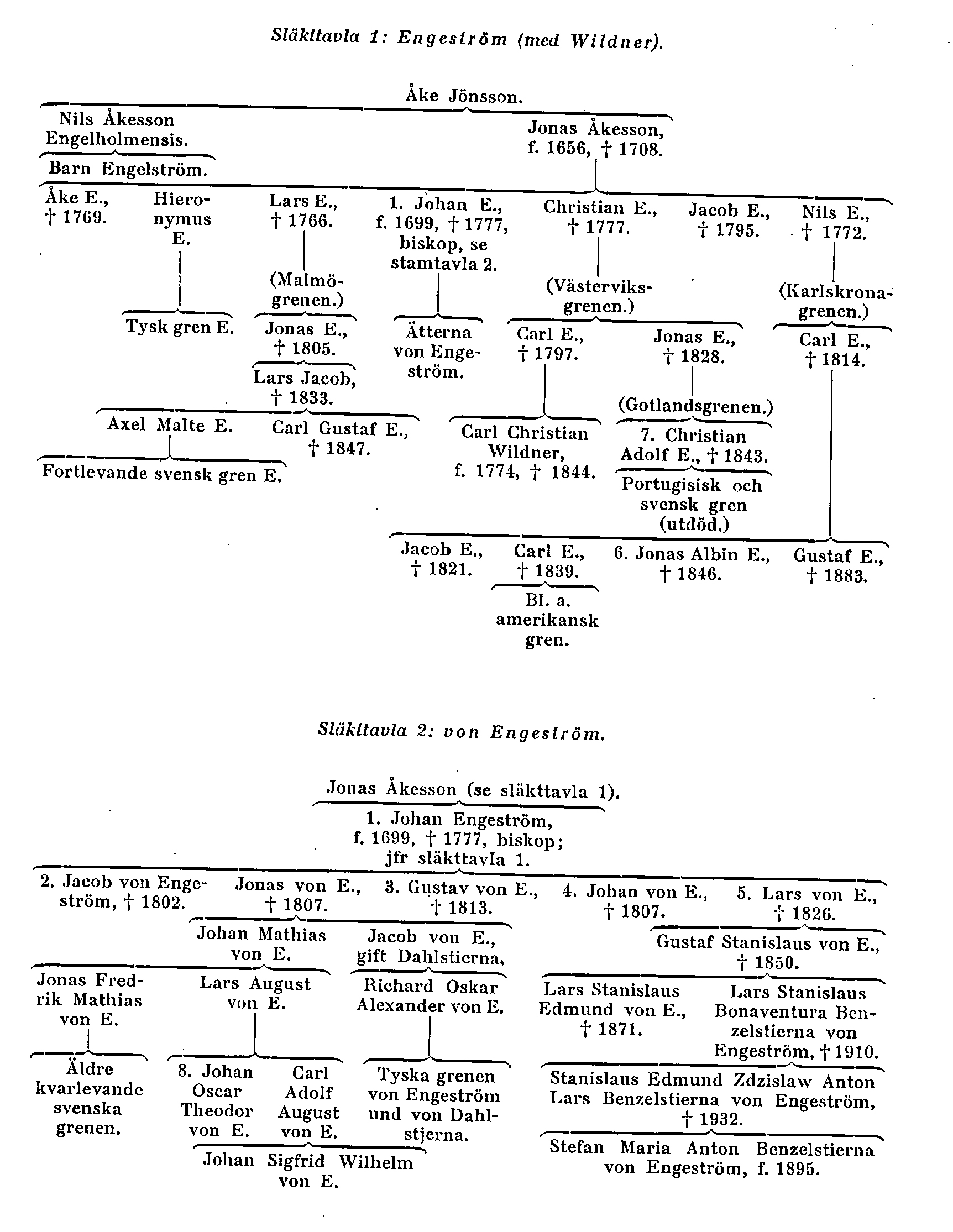
Family tree of the von Engeström noble family.

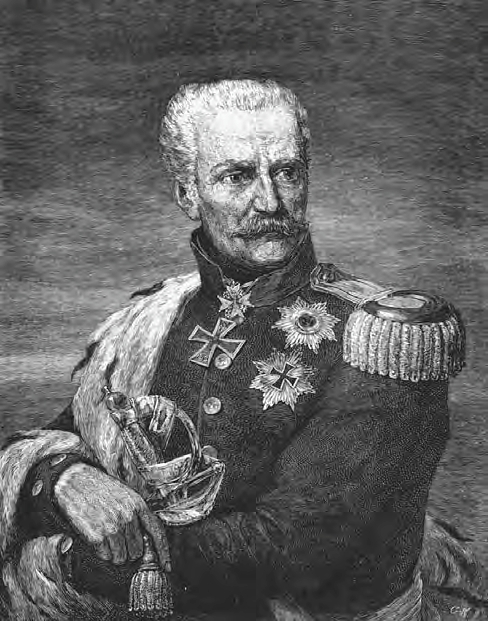
Field Marshal von Blücher whom he served under at the Battle of the Nations in 1813.

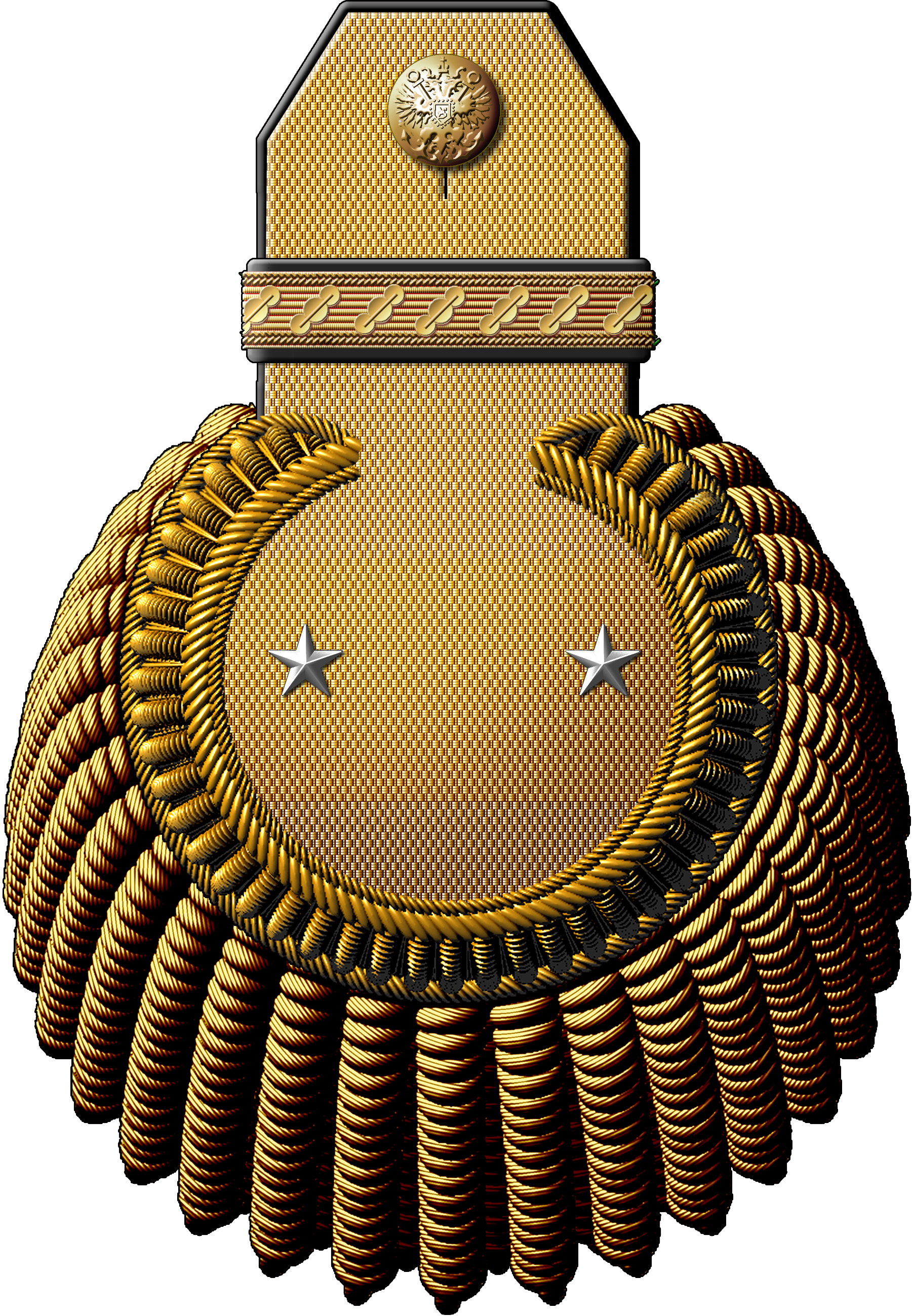
Epqulette for a Russian Major general in 1850.

== Awards ==
- (Sweden) Knight of the Order of the Sword,
- (Sweden) Medal in gold for För tapperhet i fält,
- (Kingdom of Prussia) Knight of the Pour le Mérite,
- (Russian Empire) Knight 4th Class of the Order of St. George,
- (Russian Empire) Knight of the Order of the White Eagle,
- (Russian Empire) Knight Commander of the Order of St. Stanislaus,
