= Henrik Teofilus Scheffer =

Swedish chemist (1710–1759)

Henrik Teofilus Scheffer (December 28, 1710 – August 10, 1759) was a Swedish chemist notable for his contribution to the discovery of platinum.

He was the son of Ivo Scheffer (secretary of the Swedish Board of Mines) and Gustafviana Sofia Ehrenstierna and was born in Stockholm. Scheffer was raised by his uncle Peter (Pehr) after his parents died. Scheffer was the grandson of scholar Johannes Schefferus and cousin of Counts Carl Fredrik and Ulrik Scheffer.

Scheffer studied at Uppsala University from 1725 to 1731, studying mathematics under Anders Celsius. He then began work at the Swedish Board of Mines as an auskultant – an unpaid civil servant allowed to take part in the agency's negotiations – and studied under Georg Brandt. While working there, chemist Gustaf von Engeström was one of his students. Scheffer became director of the Ädelfors gold mine in 1739 and began working as an assayer (myntproberare) in 1752.

In 1747 he was elected a member of the Royal Swedish Academy of Sciences, and in 1756 he was made a Swedish nobleman.

In addition to valuable essays in the journal Vetenskapsakademiens Handlingar of the Academy of Sciences, Scheffer is notable for his 1752 survey of platinum, which at that time was proven to be a previously unknown noble metal, and the method of separating gold from silver by means of sulfuric acid. His Chemical Lectures (published by Torbern Bergman 1775, third edition 1796) was of considerable importance for the study of chemistry in Sweden.

Scheffer married Ulrika Maria Clerck in 1737. He died in Stockholm in 1759.
