= Gustaf af Wetterstedt =

Swedish statesman (1776–1837)

Count Gustaf af Wetterstedt
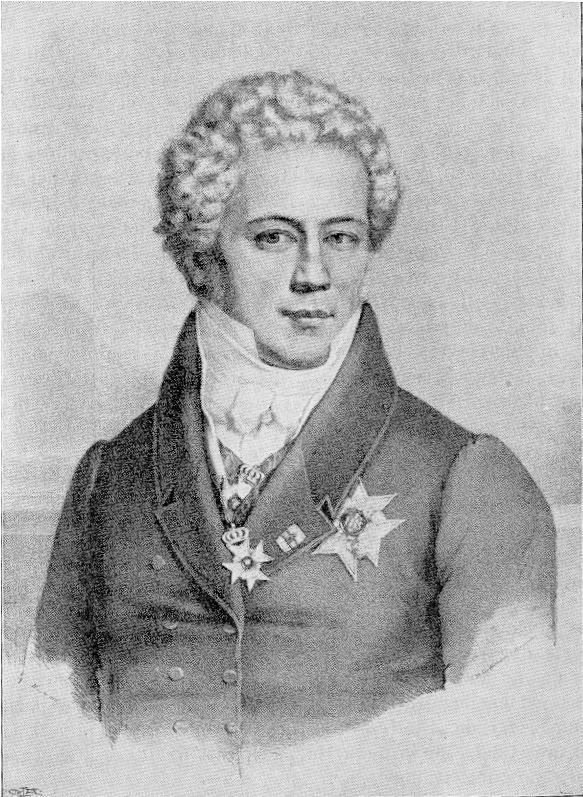

Prime Minister for Foreign Affairs
- In office 1824–1837
- Preceded by: Lars von Engeström

Personal details
- Born: 29 December 1776
- Died: 15 May 1837 (aged 60)
- Spouse: Charlotta Aurora De Geer

Count Gustaf af Wetterstedt (29 December 1776 – 15 May 1837) was a Swedish statesman. He was the Swedish Minister for Foreign Affairs from 1824 to 1837. In 1811, he was elected into the Swedish Academy, and later he also became a member of the Royal Swedish Academies of Agriculture, Music and Sciences (1817). In 1821, he was elected as a member of the American Philosophical Society in Philadelphia. He was invested Knight of the Order of the Seraphim.

Among the treaties he negotiated and signed on behalf of Sweden were the Treaty of Örebro and the Treaty of Kiel.

== References and notes ==
Political offices
Preceded by Lars von Engeström	Prime Minister for Foreign Affairs; 1824–1837	Succeeded by Adolf Göran Mörner
Cultural offices
Preceded by Gustaf Mauritz Armfelt	Swedish Academy, Seat No.17; 1811–1837	Succeeded by Anders Magnus Strinnholm
