= Gustaf von Engeström =

Swedish mineralogist and chemist (1738–1813)

- Born: Gustaf Engeström; 1 August 1738; Lund, Sweden
- Died: 12 August 1813 (aged 75); Vrå, Uppsala County, Sweden
- Education: Lund University
- Occupations: Mineralogist, chemist, mining official
- Board member of: Swedish Board of Mines
- Father: Johan Engeström
- Relatives: Siblings: Jacob von Engeström; Jonas von Engeström; Johan von Engeström; Maria Beata von Engeström; Ulrika von Engeström; Lars von Engeström; Adolph von Engeström

Gustaf von Engeström (1 August 1738 – 12 August 1813) was a Swedish mineralogist, chemist, and an official on the Swedish Board of Mines. He was a member of the Royal Swedish Academy of Sciences.

== Biography ==
Gustaf von Engeström was born in Lund. He was the son of Bishop of Lund and linguist Johan Engeström and Margareta Benzelstierna, and was knighted along with his siblings for their father's achievements in 1751 with the name von Engeström. Of six brothers, Gustaf and his youngest brother Adolph von Engeström made careers in the mining industry.

He studied in Lund, graduating in law in 1755. Engeström was enrolled in 1756 as an auskultant – an unpaid civil servant allowed to take part in the agency's negotiations – at the Swedish Board of Mines. He studied chemistry and mineralogy under Anton von Swab, Henrik Teofilus Scheffer, Georg Brandt and Axel Fredrik Cronstedt, learning from the latter the practicalities of mining, and undertook study trips to Norway (1760) and England, the Dutch Republic, and Prussia (1764). In England, he trained in chemistry, including in William Lewis' laboratory, and continued the translation of Cronstedt's mineralogy book into English. In London, he published a dissertation in English in 1770, "The use of the blowpipe in mineralogy". He became known for his description of the use of the blowpipe (which came from Cronstedt) in the analysis of minerals, originating from lectures during his stay in London in 1765 and which was subsequently translated into Swedish as Nyttan af blåsröret i mineralogien. Von Engeström published papers on mineralogy and chemistry (including the recovery of mercury from mirror glass, recovery of silver from silver chloride by reaction with potassium carbonate, alum production, and minerals from China). Between 1781 and 1784 he published the first part of a larger work, Laboratorium chymicum, and a French guide to Swedish mines. He compiled mineral collections for the Prince of Condé in France and for Catherine the Great in Russia.

He worked at the Board of Mines from 1764, first as an analyst in ore. He was promoted to supervisor of the mint in 1768, became an assessor in 1774, and in 1781 became a bergsråd (mining councilor).

Engeström was regarded by his contemporaries as a skilled mineralogist. He received an honorable offer to enter the Russian service, which he declined for patriotic reasons. There were also negotiations in Prussia by Frederick II to bring him to the Berlin Academy as a chemist. He became a member of the Royal Swedish Academy of Sciences in 1770, and its president in 1774 and 1782. In its journal Vetenskapsakademiens Handlingar there are ten minor essays by him, all in chemistry and mineralogy, and he left a couple of speeches.

He also taught chemistry and mineralogy at the Board of Mines. Engeström worked at times with August Nordenskiöld (1754–1792), the alchemist in the service of King Gustav III.

From his uncle Mathias Benzelstierna, von Engeström inherited the Vrå estate in Tibble Parish. After von Engeström was dismissed from his position as supervisor of the mint in 1794, he lived in seclusion there.

== Family ==
Von Engeström was married to Abela Charlotta Lagerbring daughter of Sven Lagerbring, a renowned historian, and a mother from the Lagercreutz family. One of the Von Engeströms' daughters married a Polish nobleman, and another married Carl Johan Adlercreutz. Their only surviving son, Sven Johan von Engeström, a court superintendent, ended Gustaf von Engeström's branch of the family.

Many of his siblings were also well-known. Jacob von Engeström (1752–1803) was a high official and involved in the conspiracy against Gustav III, for which he was sentenced to imprisonment, though the sentence was later lessened. Jonas von Engeström (1737–1807) was a judge. Johan (1743–1807) was a politician (a member of the aristocratic opposition against the king and also suspected of participating in the conspiracy against Gustav III. Lars von Engeström (1751–1826) was a foreign minister. Adolph von Engeström (1753–1825) was a high-ranking mining official. He had two sisters, Maria Beata, who married Bishop Nils Hesslén, and Ulrika.

He died in Vrå, Uppsala County, in 1813.
