= Lars von Engeström =

Swedish statesman and diplomat

Count Lars von Engeström
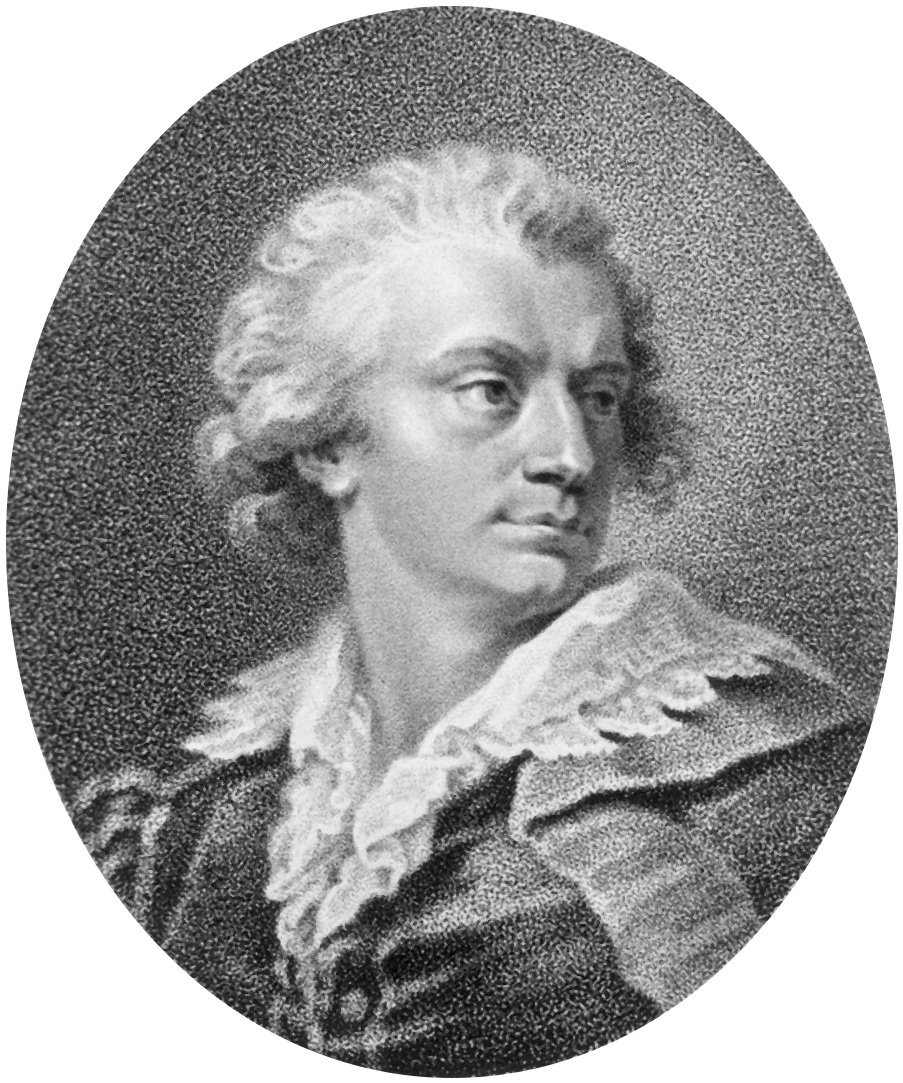

Prime Minister for Foreign Affairs
- In office 1809–1824
- Preceded by: Office created
- Succeeded by: Gustaf af Wetterstedt

Personal details
- Born: 24 December 1751 Stockholm, Sweden
- Died: 19 August 1826 (aged 74) Jankowice
- Spouse: Rozalia Drya-Chłapowska
- Children: Stanislaus von Engeström

Count Lars von Engeström (24 December 1751 – 19 August 1826) was a Swedish statesman and diplomat who served as the first Prime Minister for Foreign Affairs from 1809 to 1824, and as the Chancellor of Lund University from 1810 to 1824.

He served as envoy in Vienna from 1782 to 1787, Warsaw from 1788 to 1792, London from 1793 to 1795, and ambassador in Vienna from 1795.

He was elected a member of the Royal Swedish Academy of Sciences in 1810.

He was the son of Bishop Johan Engeström and brother of Jacob, Jonas, Gustaf, Johan, Maria Beata, Ulrika, and Adolph von Engeström.

== Honors and awards ==
- Knight of the Order of Legion of Honour
- Commander of the Order of the Polar Star
- Grand Cross of the Order of Saint Stephen of Hungary

Political offices
Preceded by Office created	Prime Minister for Foreign Affairs; 1809–1826	Succeeded by Gustaf af Wetterstedt
Cultural offices
Preceded by	Royal Swedish Academy of Sciences, Seat No. 342; 1810–1826	Succeeded by
