= Society for the Protection of the European Bison =

The Society for the Protection of the European Bison (SPEB) was founded in 1922 by scientists from Poland, Germany, the UK, and Sweden. The charity's aims were to conserve and repopulate the European bison, or wisent, that was then on the brink of extinction. After the last wild wisent was killed in 1927, SPEB reintroduced wisents (from collections in zoos) back into the wild in the Bialowieza Forest of Poland, where they still exist, as a vulnerable species (defined by the International Union for Conservation of Nature).
