= Governor of Uppsala County =

- Landshövding i Uppsala län
- Coat of arms of Uppsala County.

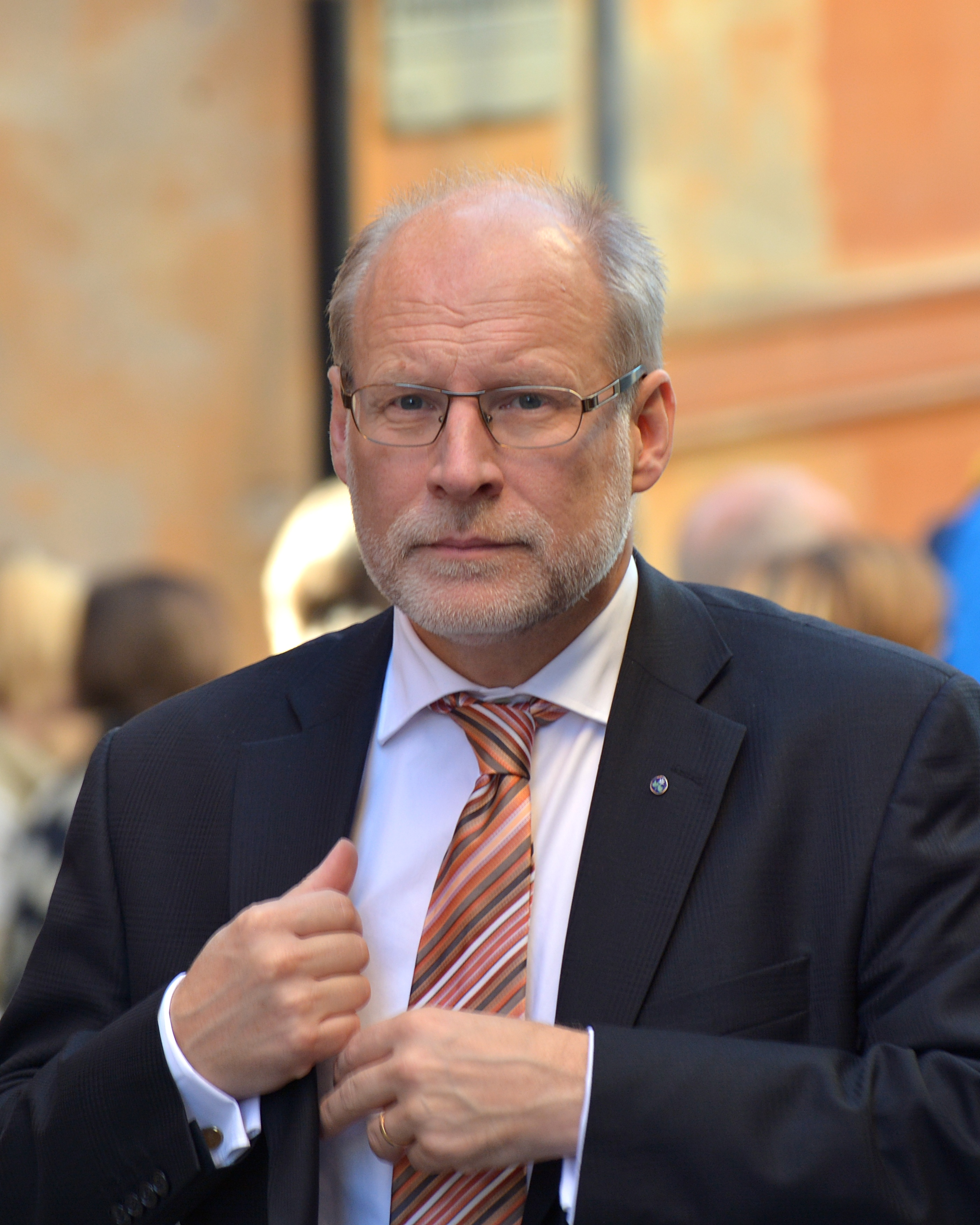
- Incumbent; Stefan Attefall since 20 April 2023
- Uppsala County Administrative Board
- Residence: Uppsala Castle, Uppsala
- Appointer: Government of Sweden
- Term length: Six years (Note: The governor is often appointed for a six-year mandate. It can be extended if the person has not reached retirement age.)
- Formation: 1640
- First holder: Göran Gyllenstierna
- Deputy: County Director (Länsrådet)
- Salary: SEK 97,800/month (2017)

This is a list of governors for Uppsala County of Sweden. Uppsala County and Stockholm County separated from Uppland County, the first time from 1641 to 1654, and then finally in 1719.

== Governors ==
=== First Period ===
- Göran Gyllenstierna, the elder (1640–1646)
- Bengt Skytte (1646–1649)
- Svante Larsson Sparre (1649–1652)
- Svante Svantesson Banér (1652–1654)

=== Second Period ===
- Pehr Lennartsson Ribbing (1714–1719)
- Fredrik Magnus Cronberg (1719–1728)
- Johan Brauner (1729–1743)
- Carl von Grooth (1743–1757)
- Johan Georg Lillienberg (1757–1762)
- Johan Funch (1762–1773)
- Gustaf Thure Rudbeck (1773–1782)
- Olof von Nackreij (1782–1783)
  - Fredrik Ulrik von Friesendorff (acting 1783)
- Jakob von Engeström (1783–1784)
  - Claes Julius Ekeblad (acting 1784)
- Claes Erik Silfverhielm (1784)
- Carl Claes Mörner (1784–1786)
- Elis Schröderheim (1786–1787)
- Adolf Fredrik Munck (appointed in 1788 but never
  took up the appointment)
- Ulrik Gottlieb Ehrenbill (1788–1792)
- Erik af Wetterstedt (1790)
- Elis Schröderheim (1792–1794)
- Erik af Wetterstedt (1794–1812)
- Berndt Wilhelm Fock (1812–1830)
- Robert Fredrik von Kraemer (1830–1862)
- Adolf Ludvig Hamilton (1862–1893)
- Ludvig Wilhelm August Douglas (1893–1895)
- Per Johan Bråkenhielm (1895–1907)
- Hjalmar Hammarskjöld (1907–1930)
- Knut Hamilton (1914–1917)
- Sigfrid Linnér (1931–1943)
- Hilding Kjellman (1943–1952)
- Georg Andrén (1952–1957)
- Elis Håstad (1957–1959)
- Olov Rylander (1959–1967)
- Ragnar Edenman (1967–1980)
- Ingemar Mundebo (1980–1986)
- Hans Alsén (1986–1992)
- Jan-Erik Wikström (1992–1997)
- Ann-Cathrine Haglund (1997–2002)
  - Ulf Henricsson (acting 2002)
- Anders Björck (2003–2009)
  - Leif Byman (acting 2009–2010)
- Peter Egardt (2010–2016)
  - Johan von Knorring (acting 2016)
- Göran Enander (2016–2023)
  - Cecilia Magnusson (acting 2023)
- Stefan Attefall (2023–)
