= Enander =

Enander is a surname. Notable people with the surname include:

- Göran Enander (born 1955), Swedish politician
- Samuel Enander (1607–1670), Swedish prelate
