= Erik af Wetterstedt =

Baron Erik af Wetterstedt KNO LVA LLA
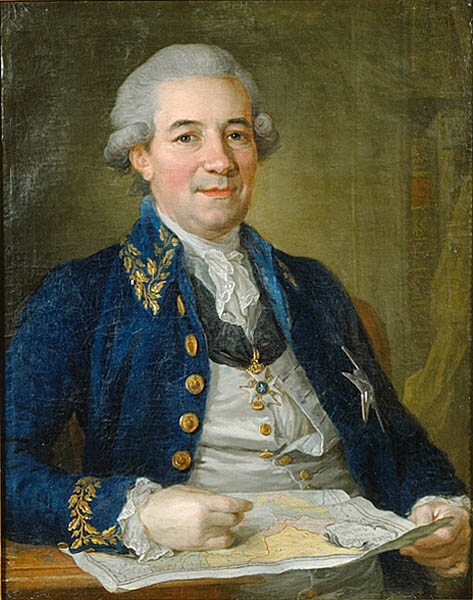
- Portrait by Lorenz Pasch the Younger.

Governor of Uppsala County
- In office 1794–1812
- Preceded by: Elis Schröderheim
- Succeeded by: Berndt Wilhelm Fock

Personal details
- Born: Erik Wetterstedt; 12 August 1736 Hjo, Sweden
- Died: 15 December 1822 (aged 86) Stockholm, Sweden
- Resting place: Uppsala Old Cemetery, Uppsala, Sweden
- Spouse: Anna Kristina Bladh
- Children: Gustaf
- Relatives: Wilhelm af Wetterstedt (grandson)

Erik af Wetterstedt (12 August 1736 – 15 December 1822) was a Swedish nobleman and statesman. He was the father of Gustaf af Wetterstedt.

== Biography ==
Erik Wetterstedt was the only son of Joakim Wetterstedt, mayor of Örebro, and Emerentia Sjöberg. In 1757 and 1761, he was enrolled at the National Swedish Land Survey Office and assumed office as acting surveyor of the Norwegian Border Commission respectively. Later, he was promoted to director of the Finnish Land Survey in 1771 and chief director of the National Swedish Land Survey Office in 1777. By being knighted on 7 October 1772, Wetterstedt was stylised as "af Wetterstedt" and since 1801, was raised to baronial peerage. He was the owner of Krusenberg Manor.

He was a member of the Royal Swedish Academy of Agriculture and the Royal Swedish Academy of Sciences. He wrote several essays, including "Om Finlands belägenhet etc." (1787; transl. "On the Plight of Finland, etc.") and "Om lämpligaste utvägarna att befordra ödemarkernas uppodling etc." (1817; transl. "On Appropriate Means of Cultivating Wastelands, etc."), in which he highly advocated for "enskiftet". Wetterstedt accompanied Gustav III, King of Sweden on his tour in Finland and probably made significant contributions to the King's plan to promote agriculture and organize administrative divisions. He died in 1822 and is buried in Uppsala Old Cemetery.

== Honours ==
- (Sweden) Commander of the Order of the Polar Star (1801)

Political offices
Preceded by Elis Schröderheim	Governor of Uppsala County; 1794–1812	Succeeded by Berndt Wilhelm Fock
Government offices
Preceded by Jacob Faggot	Chief Director of the National Swedish Land Survey Office; 1777–1822	Succeeded by Carl af Forsell
