= Elis Håstad =

Swedish political scientist and politician

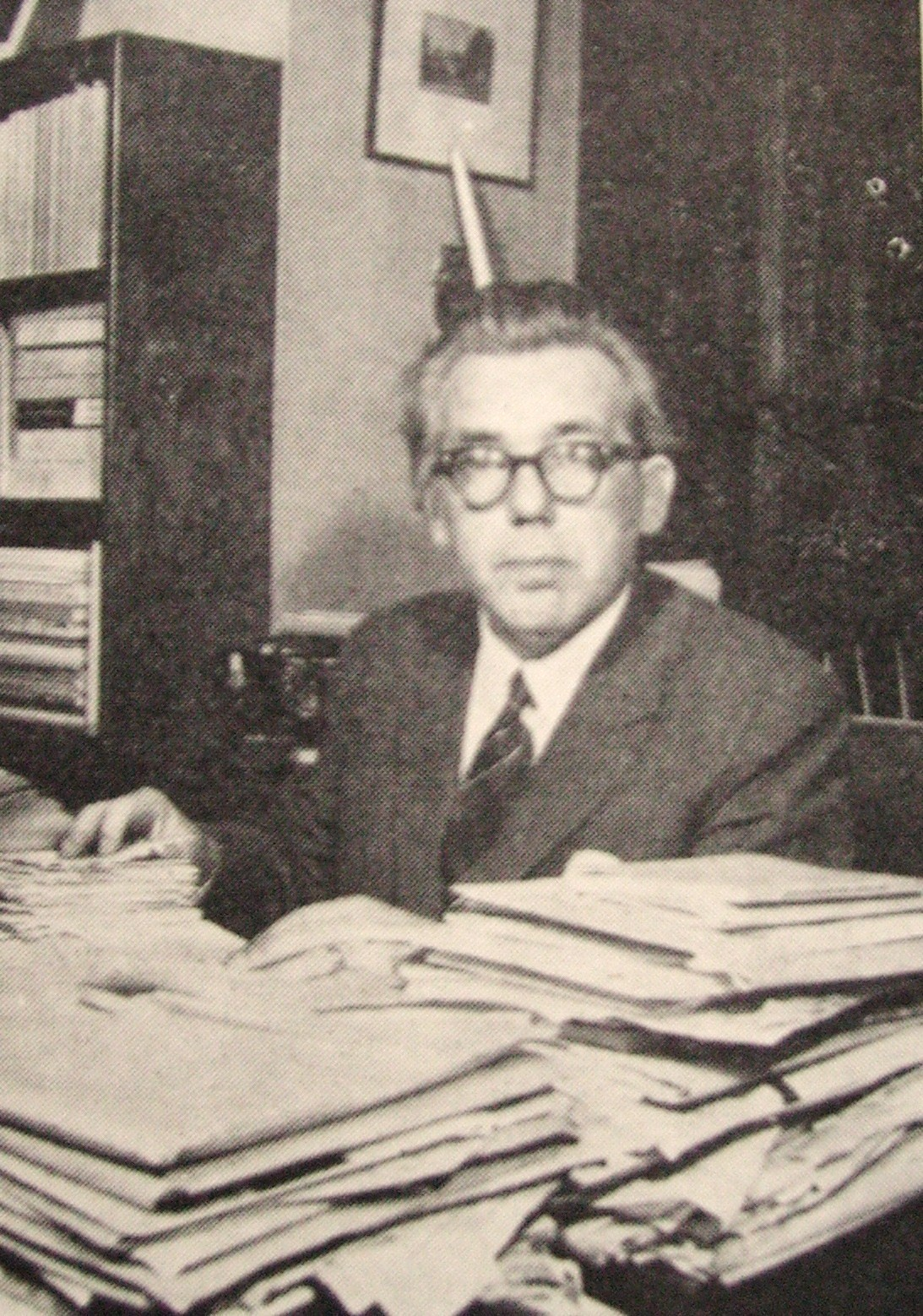
- Håstad in 1959

Governor of Uppsala County
- In office 1957–1959
- Preceded by: Georg Andrén
- Succeeded by: Olov Rylander

Member of the Riksdag
- In office 1941–1959

Personal details
- Born: Elis Wilhelm Håstad; 18 January 1900 Odensala, Sweden
- Died: 7 May 1959 (aged 59) New York City, New York, United States
- Resting place: Uppsala Old Cemetery
- Party: Right Party
- Spouse: Karin Vilhelmina Hultman
- Children: Torgny Håstad, Disa Håstad, Ottar Håstad
- Education: Uppsala University
- Occupation: Political scientist, Publicist

Elis Wilhelm Håstad (18 January 1900 – 7 May 1959) was a Swedish political scientist and politician of the Right Party. He was a professor at Stockholm University and served as the Governor of Uppsala County from 1957 until his death in 1959.

== Academic career ==
Håstad was born in Odensala. He was the son of Johan Wilhelm Andersson, a homesteader. He attended Uppsala University, where he earned a candidate of philosophy degree in 1926, followed by a licentiate in 1931 and a doctorate in 1936. His doctoral thesis was in the field of political science.

In 1948, Håstad was appointed Professor of Political Science at Stockholm University (then Stockholm University College), a position he held until 1957. He specialized in Swedish constitutional law and parliamentary history.

== Political and public career ==
Håstad was a prominent figure in the Right Party (Högerpartiet). He was elected to the Second Chamber of the Riksdag in 1941, representing the Stockholm Municipality constituency, and served as a member of parliament until 1959.

From 1936 to 1948, he served as the editor-in-chief of the political journal Svensk Tidskrift. In 1957, the government appointed him Governor of Uppsala County. He also served as the chairman of the Heimdal Association in 1926.

== Personal life ==
Håstad married Karin Vilhelmina Hultman in 1935. He was the father of the legal scholar Torgny Håstad and the journalist Disa Håstad. Through Disa Håstad and the playwright Arnold Wesker, he was the grandfather of the diplomat Elsa Håstad and the great-grandfather of the artist Jonatan Leandoer Håstad, known by the stage name Yung Lean.

Håstad suffered a heart attack and died in New York City on 7 May 1959, though his official residence remained in Uppsala He is buried at the Uppsala Old Cemetery.
