= Anders Bjork =

Anders Bjork may refer to:

- Anders Björck (born 1944), Swedish politician
- Anders Bjork (ice hockey) (born 1996), American ice hockey player
