= Saksoncular =

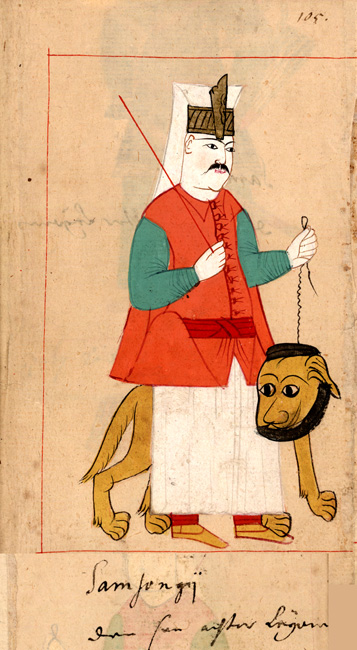
A saksoncu and a Saxon-type dog attacking bears during the sultan’s training visit, from Claes Rålamb's 1657 work Rålambska dräktboken

The Saksoncular, also known as Seksoncular or Samsoncular, were a division within the Janissary Corps (Yeniçeri Ocağı), specifically the seventy-first cemaat ortası (community division), tasked with raising Saxon-type dogs bred specifically for bear hunting. The head of the unit, known as the Saksoncubaşı, was the çorbacı (commander) of this division. Saksoncular were responsible for training dogs used in bear hunts and for certain types of military engagements. The responsibility for caring for Saxon-type dogs sent to Sultan Mehmed II by the Voivode of Wallachia for hunting purposes was also assigned to this division.

The Saksoncular maintained summer pastures for the dogs near Tophane. Occasionally, the dogs were trained by being unleashed on bears in the presence of the sultan. Beyond hunting duties, these dogs were also used in public ceremonies and performances, where they were set upon large animals such as bears or elephants, likely as a show of "strength" and "combat capability" to convey a message to onlookers. The Mastiff breed originated from Saxony. According to Evliya Çelebi, these lion-like dogs were strong enough to drag two men.

From the 16th century onwards, since Bostancı Corps (Bostancı Ocağı) began producing their own dog handlers such as tazıcılar (sighthound trainers), zağarcılar (hound trainers), and saksoncular, the need for this janissary division decreased, and externally sourced Saxon dogs began to be kept by the Bostancı Corps. Upon promotion, the Saksoncubaşı would rise to the rank of Zağarcıbaşı. In 1623, the total number of Saksoncular was 350; by 1664, it had risen to 531. This number dropped to around 200 by the second half of the 18th century. The daily wage of the Saksoncubaşı ranged between 26 and 28 akçe.
