= Fredrik Magnus Cronberg =

Swedish baron and politician (1668–1740)

Fredrik Magnus Cronberg (1668 in Stockholm - April 23, 1740), was a governor of Västerbotten, Sweden.

== Biography ==
from 1688 to 1690, he served in the Nyland and Tavastehus County Cavalry Regiment. From 1690 to 1693, he served in the Dutch War Service. He fought in multiple wars, including the Great Nordic War, the Battle of Narva (where he was severely wounded).

In 1717, he became governor of Västerbotten.

== See also ==
- List of Uppsala Governors
- List of Västerbotten Governors
