= Anders Björck =

Swedish politician

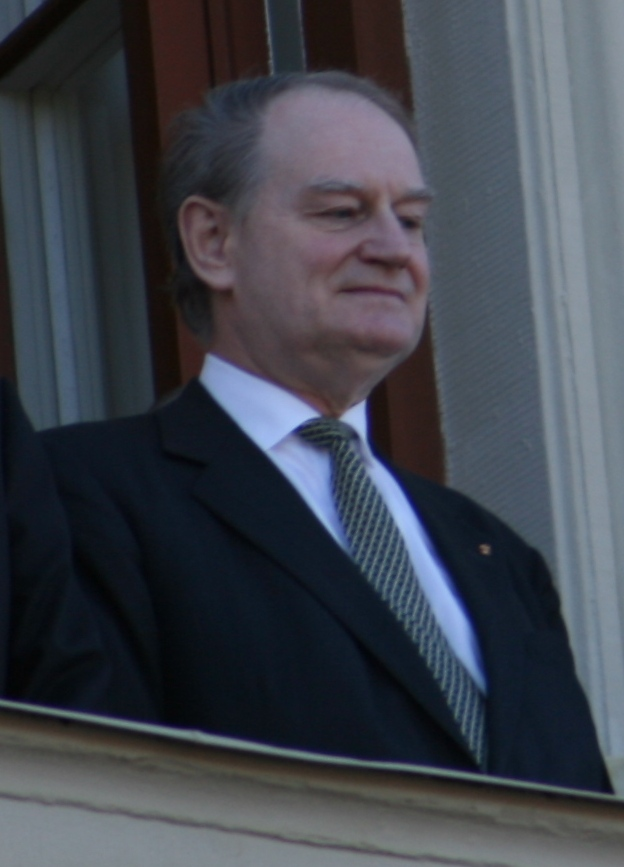
- Björck in 2009

Minister for Defence
- In office 4 October 1991 – 7 October 1994
- Prime Minister: Carl Bildt
- Preceded by: Roine Carlsson
- Succeeded by: Thage G. Peterson

Vice Speaker of the Riksdag
- In office 1994–2002
- Preceded by: Stig Alemyr
- Succeeded by: Per Westerberg

Governor of Uppsala County
- In office 2003–2009

Personal details
- Born: 19 September 1944 (age 81) Nässjö, Sweden
- Party: Moderate Party
- Occupation: Politician

Anders Per-Arne Björck (born 19 September 1944) is a Swedish politician who was Minister for Defence from 1991 to 1994 and Governor of Uppsala County from 2003 to 2009.

== Early life ==
Björck was born on 19 September 1944 in Nässjö, Sweden, the son of Arne Björck and his wife Ann-Marie (née Svensson). He attended Centralskolan in Nässjö and passed studentexamen at Nässjö läroverk in 1966.

== Career ==
Swedish was interested in politics from an early stage. He was national chairman of the Moderate Youth League, or the Rightist Youth League (Högerns ungdomsförbund) as it was known at the time of his election. He was the first truly young – only 21 – chairman of the Youth League – his predecessor was 35 years old. Before that he served as national chairman of the Conservative School Youth, today known as the Moderate School Youth, from 1961 to 1963.

In 1968, aged only 22, he was elected to the Riksdag for the Rightist Party (Högerpartiet) which became the Moderate Party in 1969.

In 1989 he was elected president of the Council of Europe and served until 1991, when the Moderate Party won the election and Carl Bildt was allowed to form a government. He was appointed Minister for Defence. When the Moderates lost the 1994 election he became vice speaker of the Riksdag, a position he held until 2002.

Björck was known to belong to the so-called "Bunker gang", a group of politicians and advisors forming the inner circle around party leader Carl Bildt.

Between 2003 and 2009, Björck was Governor of Uppsala County.

Anders Björck has continued to speak up on political issues from time to time. He remains rather Conservative, compared to other Moderates, and has on numerous occasions spoken up against what he perceives as the growing influence of liberalism in the Moderate Party.

== Personal life ==
In 1975, Björck married Py-Lotte von Zweigbergk (born 1948), the daughter of Sverker von Zweigbergk and Astrid (née Sigström). They have one daughter, Anne Björck.

== Awards and decorations ==
- (Sweden) H. M. The King's Medal, 12th size gold (silver-gilt) medal worn around the neck on the Order of the Seraphim ribbon (2003)
- Grand Decoration of Honour in Gold with Sash for Services to the Republic of Austria (1994)

== Honours ==
- Chairman of the Sällskapet
- Chairman of the Swedish Pistol Shooting Association (Svenska pistolskytteförbundet) from 2003 to 2009
- Honorary member of the Royal Gustavus Adolphus Academy
- Honorary member of the Swedish Pistol Shooting Association (Svenska pistolskytteförbundet)
- Member of the Swedish Order of Freemasons
- Member of the Independent Order of Odd Fellows
- Årets smålänning ("Smålänning of the Year") (1988)

Political offices
Preceded by Roine Carlsson	Swedish Minister for Defence; 1991–1994	Succeeded by Thage G. Peterson
Preceded by Stig Alemyr	Vice Speaker of the Riksdag; 1994–2002	Succeeded by Per Westerberg
Preceded by Ulf Henricsson	Governor of Uppsala County; 2003–2009	Succeeded by Peter Egardt
