= Håkan Parkman =

Swedish composer, arranger, and choral director

Håkan Parkman (1955–1988) was a Swedish composer, arranger, and choral director. From 1980 to 1988 he led the Uppsala vokalensemble. He died in a drowning accident off the coast of Gotland and is buried in the Uppsala old cemetery. He was the brother of Stefan Parkman.

== Works, editions and recordings ==
- Titania
- Till Österland (Arr. for Choir and Soprano)
- Kyrie
- Espresso
- C-Dur
- November med skiftningar av ädelt pälsverk
- Från Berget

=== Three Shakespeare songs ===
- I. Sonnet 76: Why is my Verse so Barren of New Pride
- II. Madrigal: Take, O Take Those Lips Away
- III. Sonnet 147: My Love is a Fever
