= Jan-Erik Roos =

Swedish mathematician (1935–2017)

Jan-Erik Ingvar Roos (16 October 1935 – 15 December 2017) was a Swedish mathematician whose research interests were in abelian category theory, homological algebra, and related areas.

He was born in Halmstad, in the province of Halland on the Swedish west coast. Roos enrolled at Lund University in 1954, and started studying mathematics with Lars Gårding in 1957. Under Gårding's direction he wrote a thesis on ordinary differential equation, and graduated in 1958 with a licentiate degree. Later that year he went to Paris on a doctoral scholarship; there, he gravitated towards the mathematical environment at the Institut Henri Poincaré, and the various seminars held there. After a while, he started attending Alexander Grothendieck's seminar at the Institut des hautes études scientifiques in Bures-sur-Yvette, where he became interested in abstract algebra and algebraic geometry. In 1967 he was invited by Saunders Mac Lane to visit the University of Chicago for three months; Mac Lane was impressed by Roos and later wrote a very positive letter of recommendation for him.

Upon his return to Sweden, Roos was appointed Professor of Mathematics at Stockholm University in 1970, and started building a strong algebra school. He was elected to the Royal Swedish Academy of Sciences in 1980 and was its President from 1980 to 1982. While serving on the Academy, he was on the committees deciding the Rolf Schock Prizes in Mathematics and the Crafoord Prize in Astronomy and Mathematics.

Roos made important contributions to homological algebra, and did extensive computer-assisted studies of Hilbert–Poincaré series and their rationality. A special issue of the journal Homology, Homotopy and Applications ("The Roos Festschrift volume") was published in 2002, on the occasion of his 65th birthday.

He died on 15 December 2017 at his home in Uppsala and is buried at the Uppsala old cemetery.

== Publications ==
- Roos, Jan-Erik (1961). "Sur les foncteurs dérivés de $\varprojlim$. Applications". Comptes rendus de l'Académie des Sciences. 252: 3702–3704. MR 0132091.
- Roos, Jan-Erik (1993). "Commutative non-Koszul algebras having a linear resolution of arbitrarily high order. Applications to torsion in loop space homology". Comptes rendus de l'Académie des Sciences. 316 (11): 1123–1128. MR 1221635.
- Löfwall, Clas; Roos, Jan-Erik (1997). "A Nonnilpotent 1-2-Presented Graded Hopf Algebra Whose Hilbert Series Converges in the Unit Circle". Advances in Mathematics. 130 (2): 161–200. doi:10.1006/aima.1997.1667. MR 1472316.
- Roos, Jan-Erik; Sturmfels, Bernd (1998). "A toric ring with irrational Poincaré-Betti series". Comptes rendus de l'Académie des Sciences. 326 (2): 141–146. Bibcode:1998CRASM.326..141R. doi:10.1016/S0764-4442(97)89459-1. MR 1646972.
- Roos, Jan-Erik (2006). "Derived functors of inverse limits revisited". Journal of the London Mathematical Society. 73 (1): 65–83. doi:10.1112/S0024610705022416. MR 2197371. S2CID 122666355.
- Roos, Jan-Erik (2008). "The homotopy Lie algebra of a complex hyperplane arrangement is not necessarily finitely presented". Experimental Mathematics. 17 (2): 129–143. arXiv:math/0610126. doi:10.1080/10586458.2008.10129030. MR 2433880. S2CID 7626968.
- Roos, Jan-Erik (2010). "Three-dimensional manifolds, skew-Gorenstein rings and their cohomology". Journal of Commutative Algebra. 2 (4): 473–499. arXiv:1005.2919. doi:10.1216/JCA-2010-2-4-473. MR 2753719.
