= Elsa Håstad =

Swedish diplomat

Swedish Ambassador to Albania
- In office 1 September 2019 – August 2023
- Preceded by: Johan Ndisi
- Succeeded by: Niklas Ström

Personal details
- Born: Elsa Sara Mariann Håstad; 7 August 1970 (age 56) Stockholm, Sweden
- Spouse: Kristoffer Leandoer
- Children: Jonatan Leandoer Håstad, Miriam Leandoer Håstad
- Parent(s): Disa Håstad; Arnold Wesker
- Education: Stockholm University
- Occupation: Diplomat

Elsa Sara Mariann Håstad (born 7 August 1970) is a Swedish diplomat who served as the Swedish Ambassador to Albania from 2019 to 2023. She is currently the minister counsellor at the Swedish embassy in Kyiv. She is a specialist in human rights and regional affairs concerning Russia and the former Soviet Union.

== Early life and education ==
Håstad was born in Stockholm. She is the daughter of the journalist and author Disa Håstad and the British playwright Arnold Wesker. As a child, she lived for five years in the Soviet Union while her mother worked as a foreign correspondent. Håstad earned a Bachelor of Arts from Stockholm University, where she studied the Russian language, political science, and social anthropology.

== Career ==
Håstad began working in the field of human rights in 1997. From 1997 to 1999, she worked for the United Nations Development Programme (UNDP) in Belarus, focusing on freedom of expression. In 1999, she joined the Swedish International Development Cooperation Agency (Sida). Her work at Sida primarily covered Russia, Ukraine, Central Asia, and the North Caucasus.

Between 2008 and 2011, Håstad was stationed at the Swedish Embassy in Hanoi, Vietnam, where she managed human rights projects. She returned to Sida in 2011 as a head of department, overseeing development programs in Colombia, Guatemala, Bolivia, and the Western Balkans.

In May 2019, the Swedish government appointed Håstad as the Ambassador to Tirana, Albania. She took up the post on 1 September 2019 and served through the 2023 Swedish Presidency of the Council of the European Union. She concluded her term in August 2023.

== Personal life ==
Håstad is married to the Swedish author and literary critic Kristoffer Leandoer. They have two children: Miriam Leandoer Håstad and the artist Jonatan Leandoer Håstad, known by the stage name Yung Lean.

She is the granddaughter of the politician Elis Håstad. Her maternal uncle is the jurist and former Supreme Court Justice Torgny Håstad.
