= Stefan Attefall =

Swedish politician (born 1960)

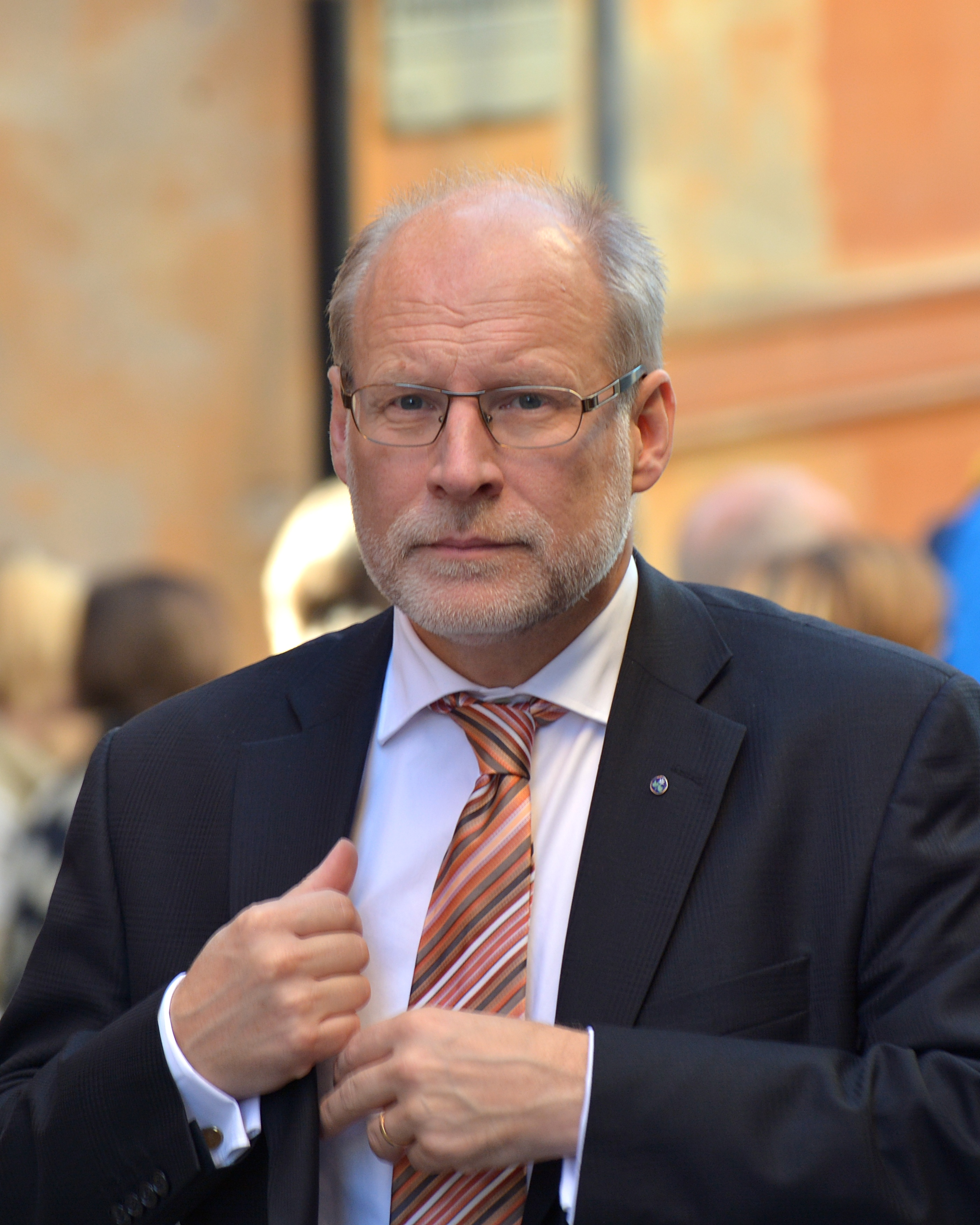
- Stefan Attefall at the 2014 Riksdag Opening Session on 29 September 2014.

Governor of Uppsala County
- Incumbent
- Assumed office 20 April 2023
- Monarch: Carl XVI Gustaf
- Prime Minister: Ulf Kristersson
- Preceded by: Göran Enander

Minister for Public Administration
- In office 5 October 2010 – 3 October 2014
- Monarch: Carl XVI Gustaf
- Prime Minister: Fredrik Reinfeldt
- Preceded by: Mats Odell
- Succeeded by: Ardalan Shekarabi

Minister for Housing
- In office 5 October 2010 – 3 October 2014
- Monarch: Carl XVI Gustaf
- Prime Minister: Fredrik Reinfeldt
- Preceded by: Mats Odell
- Succeeded by: Mehmet Kaplan

Member of the Riksdag
- In office 30 September 1991 – 3 October 1994
- Constituency: Jönköping County
- In office 5 October 1998 – 29 September 2014
- Constituency: Jönköping County

Personal details
- Born: 21 August 1960 (age 65) Lycksele, Västerbotten
- Party: Christian Democrats
- Spouse: Cecilia Attefall
- Children: 3
- Occupation: Politician, Contributing editor
- Website: Official website

Jan Stefan Attefall (born 21 August 1960, in Lycksele, Västerbotten County) is a Swedish politician and civil servant who currently serves as Governor of Uppsala County since 2023. He previously served as Minister for Public Administration and Minister for Housing from 2010 to 2014. He is a member of the Christian Democrats.

== Biography ==
Attefall has a bachelor's degree in political science and economics from Umeå University. He is the son of the boat builder Konrad Lindström and adopted mother Solveig's Attefall. His brother Anders Sellström is also a Christian Democratic politician. Attefall joined KDS in his teens and soon received political assignments.

Attefall was union chairman of the Christian Democratic Youth Union 1986–1989. Attefall was Member of the Riksdag from 1991 to 1994 and from 1998 to 2014. In the Riksdag, Attefall served as parliamentary group leader of his party from 2002 to 2010 and as chairman of the Committee on Finance from 2006 to 2010.

His name is associated with the Attefall house, a larger version of the friggebod.

Elected chairman of RIO (Rörelsefolkhögskolornas intresseorganisation) in 2017.

== Personal life ==
Attefall married the psychologist Karin Hansson (born 1958) in 1986, later divorced, married for the second time in 1996 to the journalist Cecilia Hjorth Attefall (born 1967), who is chairman of Erikshjälpen and chairman of the senior citizens' committee in Jönköping Municipality. They have three children together, a son and two daughters. The family lives in Jönköping.

Preceded by Göran Enander	Governor of Uppsala County; 2023–present	Succeeded by Incumbent
