= Torgny Håstad =

Swedish legal scholar and judge

Justice of the Supreme Court of Sweden
- In office 1998–2011

Personal details
- Born: Torgny Wilhelm Håstad; 28 December 1943 (age 82) Stockholm, Sweden
- Parent: Elis Håstad
- Relatives: Disa Håstad (sister); Elsa Håstad (niece); Yung Lean (great-nephew)
- Education: Uppsala University
- Profession: Jurist, Professor

Torgny Wilhelm Håstad (born 28 December 1943) is a Swedish legal scholar and former Justice of the Supreme Court of Sweden. He served as a member of the court from 1998 until his retirement in 2011.

== Career ==
Håstad was born in Stockholm and completed his legal education at Uppsala University. He earned his Candidate of Law in 1967, followed by a Licentiate in 1971 and a Doctorate in Law in 1973. His doctoral thesis, Tjänster utan uppdrag (Services without Assignment), examined the legal principle of negotiorum gestio.

From 1971 to 1973, Håstad practiced as an associate at the law firm Chrysander in Uppsala. He transitioned into academia in 1976 as an associate professor of civil law at Uppsala University and was promoted to Professor of Civil Law in 1978, a position he held for two decades. Between 1994 and 1998, he served as the Dean of the Faculty of Law.

In 1998, the Swedish government appointed Håstad as a Justice of the Supreme Court. During his tenure, he was involved in several influential rulings regarding contract law and property rights. He retired from the bench in 2011.

In the legislative field, Håstad chaired several government committees, including the Business Prohibition Committee (1982), the Commission Act Committee (1985), and the Preferential Rights Committee (1996). He was also the chairman of the trade union Jusek from 1979 to 1987 and the Swedish Tourist Association from 2003 to 2011.

== Personal life ==
Håstad is the son of the politician and political scientist Elis Håstad and the brother of journalist Disa Håstad. He is the uncle of the diplomat Elsa Håstad and the maternal great-uncle of the rapper Yung Lean (Jonatan Leandoer Håstad).

== Honours and memberships ==
- Member of the Royal Swedish Academy of Sciences (1990)
- Member of the Norwegian Academy of Science and Letters (1991)
- Recipient of His Majesty The King's Medal, 12th size with the ribbon of the Order of the Seraphim

== Selected works ==
- Tjänster utan uppdrag (1973)
- Sakrätt avseende lös egendom (Property Law Regarding Movable Assets) (1982)
- Den nya köprätten (The New Sale of Goods Act) (1989)
- Civilrättens grunder (Fundamentals of Civil Law) (2016)
