= Peter Egardt =

Swedish executive

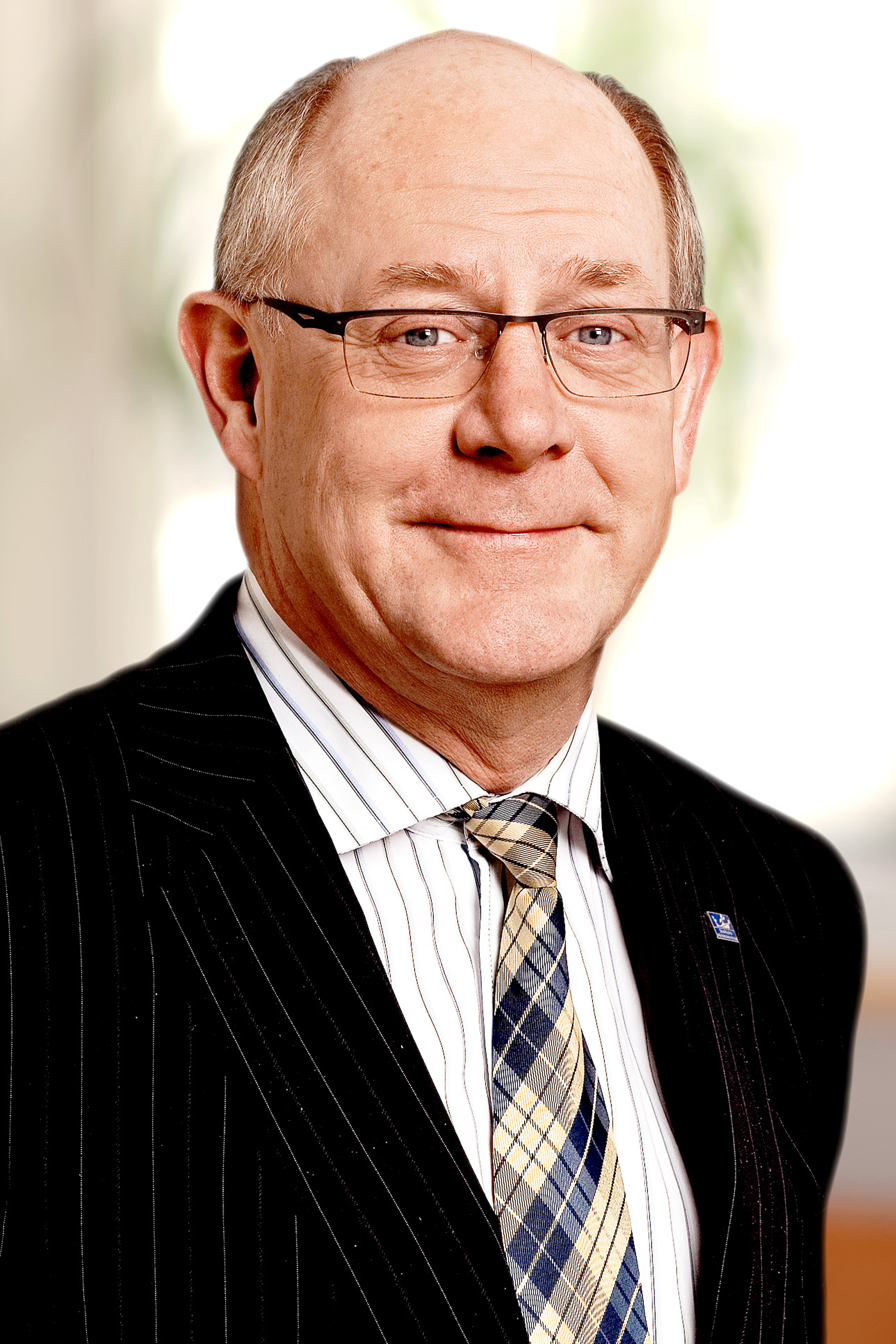
Peter Egardt Photo: Sveriges Riksbank

Peter Arvid Nils Egardt (born 1949) is a Swedish executive who served as Secretary of State for the Prime Minister from 1991 to 1994, and County Governor (landshövding) of Uppsala County from 2010 to September, 2016. Before being appointed County Governor, he was CEO of the Stockholm Chamber of commerce (Handelskammaren i Stockholm).

Egardt succeeded Anders Björck as County Governor in 2010. Originally appointed to serve until 31 August 2014, on 27 February 2014 his appointment was extended to 31 August 2016, when he was succeeded by Göran Enander.

== See also ==
- List of governors of Uppsala County

Preceded by Anders Björck	Governor of Uppsala County; 2010-2016	Succeeded by Göran Enander
