= Ragnar Edenman =

Swedish social democrat politician (1914–1998)

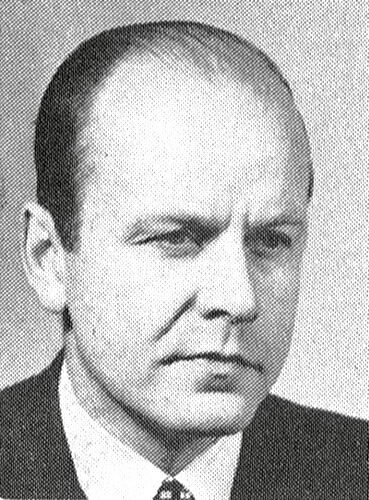

Governor of Uppsala County
- In office 1967–1980

Minister of Education and Ecclesiastical Affairs
- In office 1957–1967
- Preceded by: Ivar Persson
- Succeeded by: Olof Palme

Personal details
- Born: 1 April 1914
- Died: 27 January 1998 (aged 83)
- Party: Social Democratic Party
- Education: Uppsala University
- Awards: Order of the Seraphim; 1978

Ragnar Edenman (1 April 1914 – 27 January 1998) was a Swedish politician who was part of the Swedish Social Democratic Party and served as the minister of education and ecclesiastical affairs between 1957 and 1967 and as the governor of Uppsala County from 1967 to 1980. Johan Östling argues that Edenman was one of the Swedish generation of 1945 figures who adopted the rationalist cultural radicalism.

== Early life and education ==
Edenman was born in 1914. His Ph.D. is entitled Socialdemokratiska riksdagsgruppen, 1903-1920, en studie i den svenska Riksdagens partiväsen (Swedish: The Social Democratic parliamentary group 1903-1920: a study in the party system of the Swedish parliament), which he completed at Uppsala University in 1946. It is one of the most comprehensive studies about the history of the parliament group of the Swedish Social Democratic Party in the pre-1920 period.

== Career ==
Edenman was a member of the Swedish Social Democratic Party. In 1946, he began to work at the Ministry of Education as a political advisor when Tage Erlander was the minister. He also served as the undersecretary at the ministry between 1950 and 1956.

He was appointed minister of education and ecclesiastical affairs in 1957 replacing Ivar Persson in the post. His portfolio included educational and cultural policies. Sweden's new cultural policy which was implemented in the 1970s had been developed by the ministry under the supervision of Edenman in May 1959. For him cultural activities should be shaped by the state, not by the private sector. It was Edenman who appointed Ingmar Bergman as the manager of the Royal Dramatic Theatre in Stockholm in 1963. He also encouraged Bergman to submit his film The Silence to the State Censorship Authority.

In 1967 Edenman resigned from the post. His successor as the minister of education and ecclesiastical affairs was Olof Palme. Then he served as the governor of Uppsala County from 1967 to 1980.

== Death and awards ==
Edenman died in 1998.

Edenman was the recipient of the Order of the Seraphim which was awarded to him in 1978. In 1991 he was named as one of the 50 Honorary Fellows of Uppsala University.
