= Göran Enander =

Swedish politician

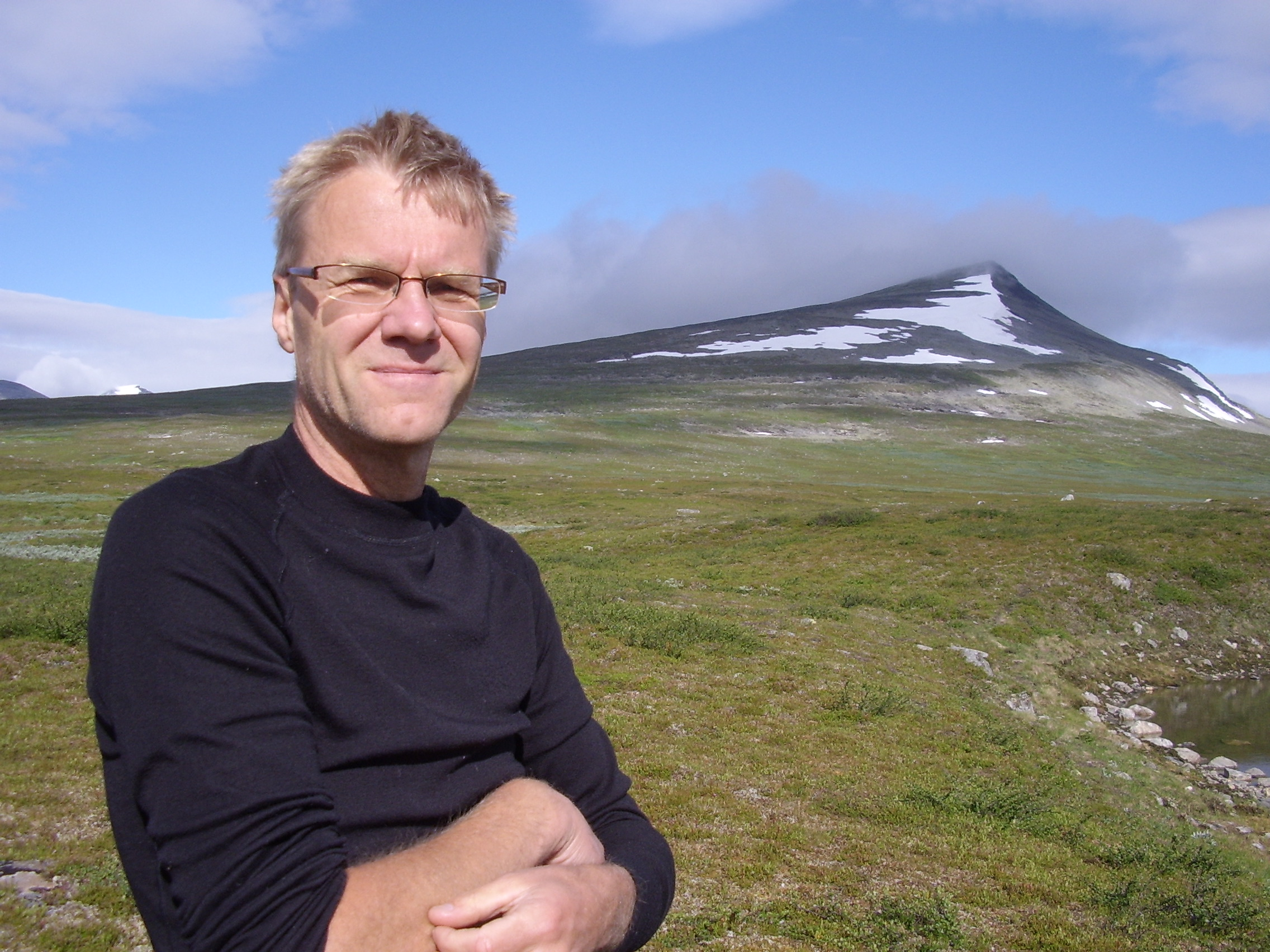

Governor of Uppsala County
- In office 1 November 2016 – 20 April 2023
- Monarch: Carl XVI Gustaf
- Preceded by: Peter Egardt
- Succeeded by: Stefan Attefall

Personal details
- Born: 1 September 1955 (age 70) Gällstad, Älvsborg County

Göran Enander, born in Gällstad, Älvsborg County on 1 September 1955, was the County Governor (landshövding) of Uppsala County, Sweden, from 1 November 2016 to 28 February 2023.

Enander was Secretary of State at the Ministry of the Environment and Energy 2014–2015 and has previously had several executive positions, e.g. at the Swedish Research Council (Vetenskapsrådet) and the Forestry Council of Sweden (Skogsstyrelsen).

Between 1998 and 2000, Enander was chairman of the Swedish Society for Nature Conservation. He is a member of the Royal Swedish Academy of Agriculture and Forestry.

== See also ==
- List of governors of Uppsala County

Preceded by Peter Egardt	Governor of Uppsala County; 2016–2023	Succeeded by Stefan Attefall
