= Svante Svantesson Banér =

Swedish privy councillor

Svante Svantesson Banér (6 June 1624 – 1674) was a Swedish noble. He served as governor of Uppland County from 1656 to 1660, and served on the Riksråd for Christina, Queen of Sweden in 1654. He built the modern Djursholm Castle after the previous building burned down in 1656.
