= Uppland County =

County in Sweden between 1634 and 1714

Uppland County Upplands län
- County of the Swedish Empire
- 1634–1641; 1654–1714
- Flag
- Government
- Governor
  - 1634–1641: Lars Eriksson Sparre av Rossvik
  - 1695–1714: Johan Hoghusen
- History
  - Established: 1634
  - Disestablished: 1714
Preceded by	Succeeded by
Stockholm County; Uppsala County	Stockholm County; Uppsala County

Uppland County, or Upplands län, was a county of the Swedish Empire from 1634 to 1641, and from 1654 to 1714. Between 1641 and 1654, and after 1714, it was split into the Uppsala County and the Stockholm County.

== Governors ==
- Lars Eriksson Sparre av Rossvik (1634–1641)
- Lars Claesson Fleming af Liebelitz (1654)
- Gustaf Persson Banér (1654–1656)
- Svante Svantesson Banér (1656–1660)
- Claes Rålamb (1660–1664)
- Göran Gyllenstierna (1664–1666)
- Axel Axelsson Lillie (1666–1679)
  - Carl Gabriel Bååt (acting 1678–1679)
- Gustaf Lilliecrona (1679–1681)
- Lars Claesson Fleming af Liebelitz (1681)
- Fabian Wrede (1681–1685)
- Olof Arvidsson Thegner (1685–1689)
- Jakob Gyllenborg (1689–1695)
- Johan Hoghusen (1695–1714)
