= Uppsala Old Cemetery =

Cemetery in Uppsala län, Sweden

Coordinates: 59°51′15″N 17°37′20″E

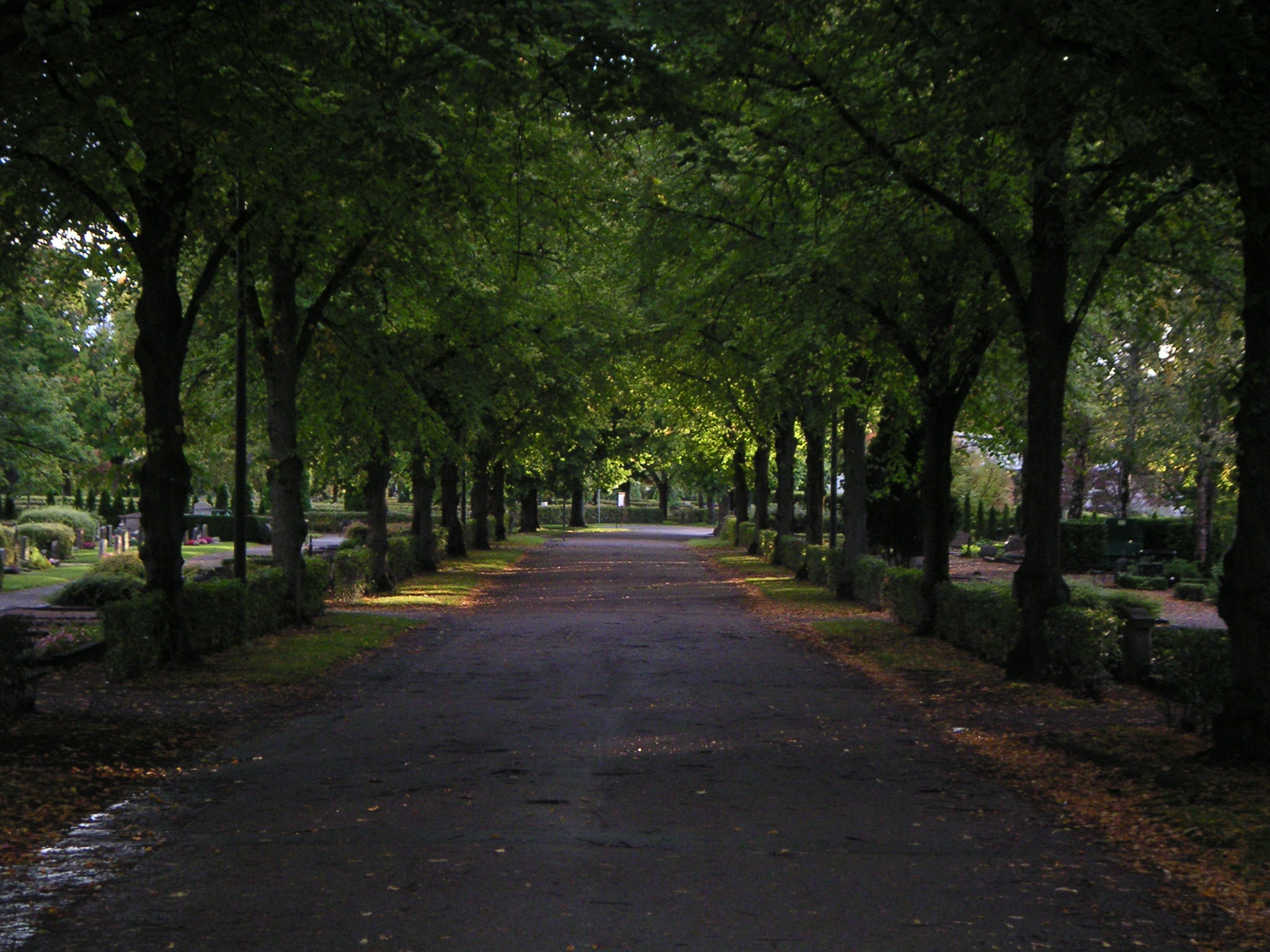
Avenue in Uppsala old cemetery.

Uppsala Old Cemetery (Swedish: Uppsala gamla kyrkogård) is a cemetery in Uppsala, Sweden.

In July 2024, about 20 grave sites at Uppsala Old Cemetery were vandalized (overturned gravestones, broken grave lanterns and destroyed flower arrangements).

== Notable burials ==
- Greta Arwidsson (1906–1998)
- Lasse Eriksson (1949–2011)
- Gustaf Fröding (1860–1911)
- Dag Hammarskjöld (1905–1961)
- Salomon Eberhard Henschen (1847–1930)
- Gösta Knutsson (1908–1973)
- Lotten von Kræmer (1828–1912)
- Bruno Liljefors (1860–1939)
- Viveca Lindfors (1920–1995)
- Davud Monshizadeh (1914–1989)
- Joachim Daniel Andreas Müller (1812–1857)
- Måns von Rosenstein (1755-1801)
- Sven Odén (1887–1934)
- Håkan Parkman (1955–1988)
- Anders Fredrik Regnell (1807–1884)
- Jan-Erik Roos (1935–2017)
- Margit Sahlin (1914–2003)
- Carl Einar Thure af Wirsén (1875–1946)
- Östen Undén (1886–1974)
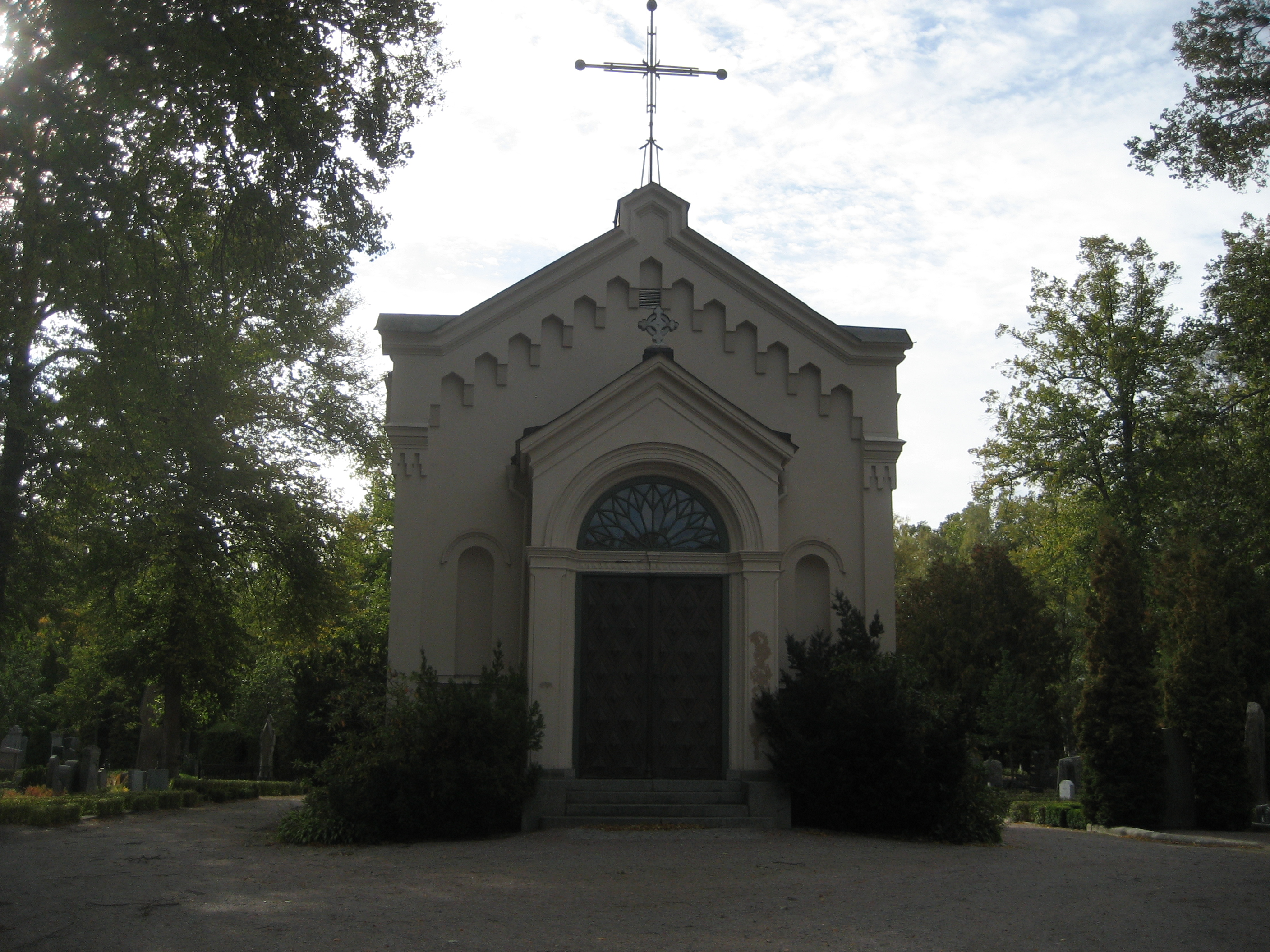
Chapel, built 1882–1883

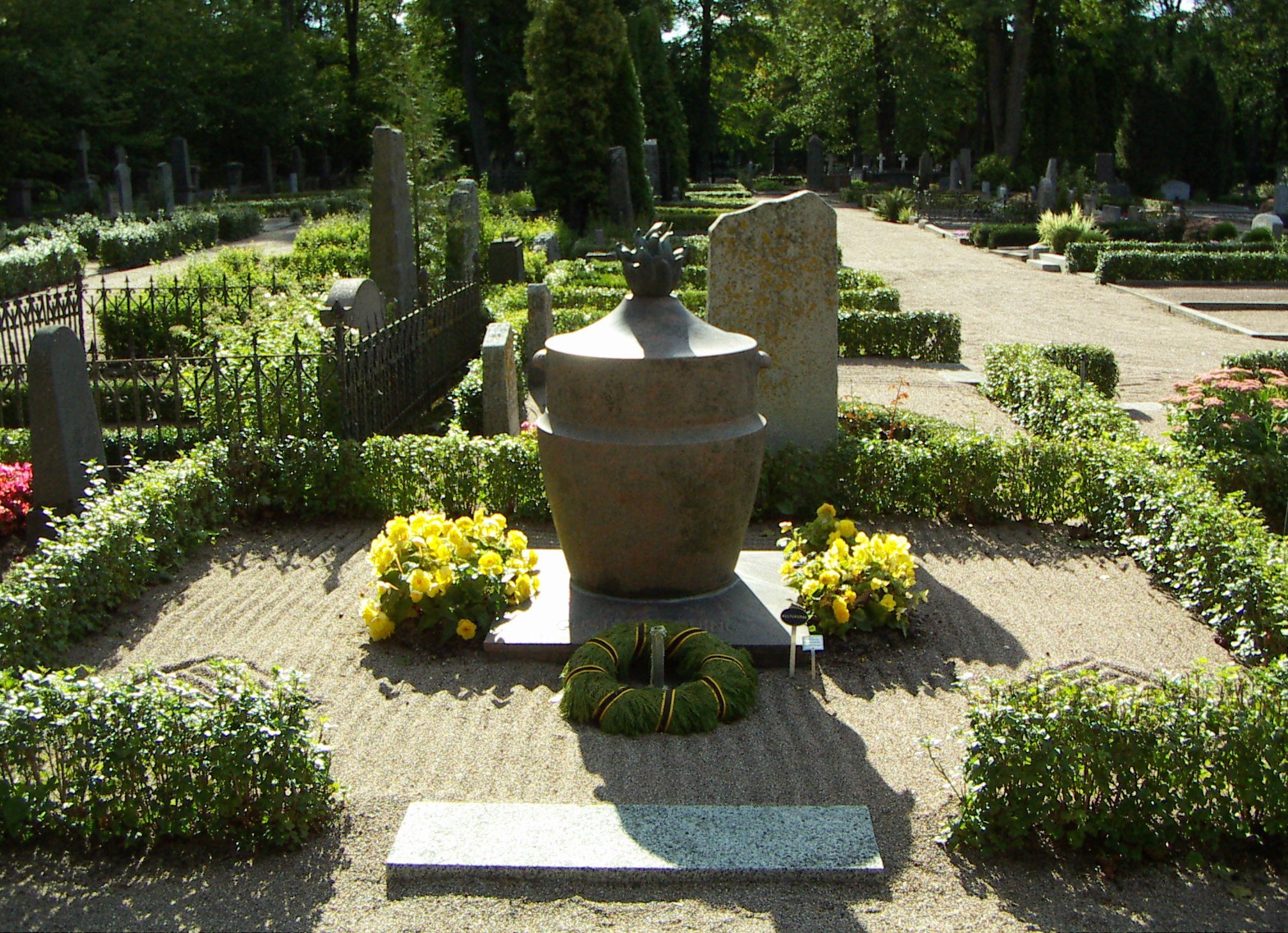
Gustaf Fröding

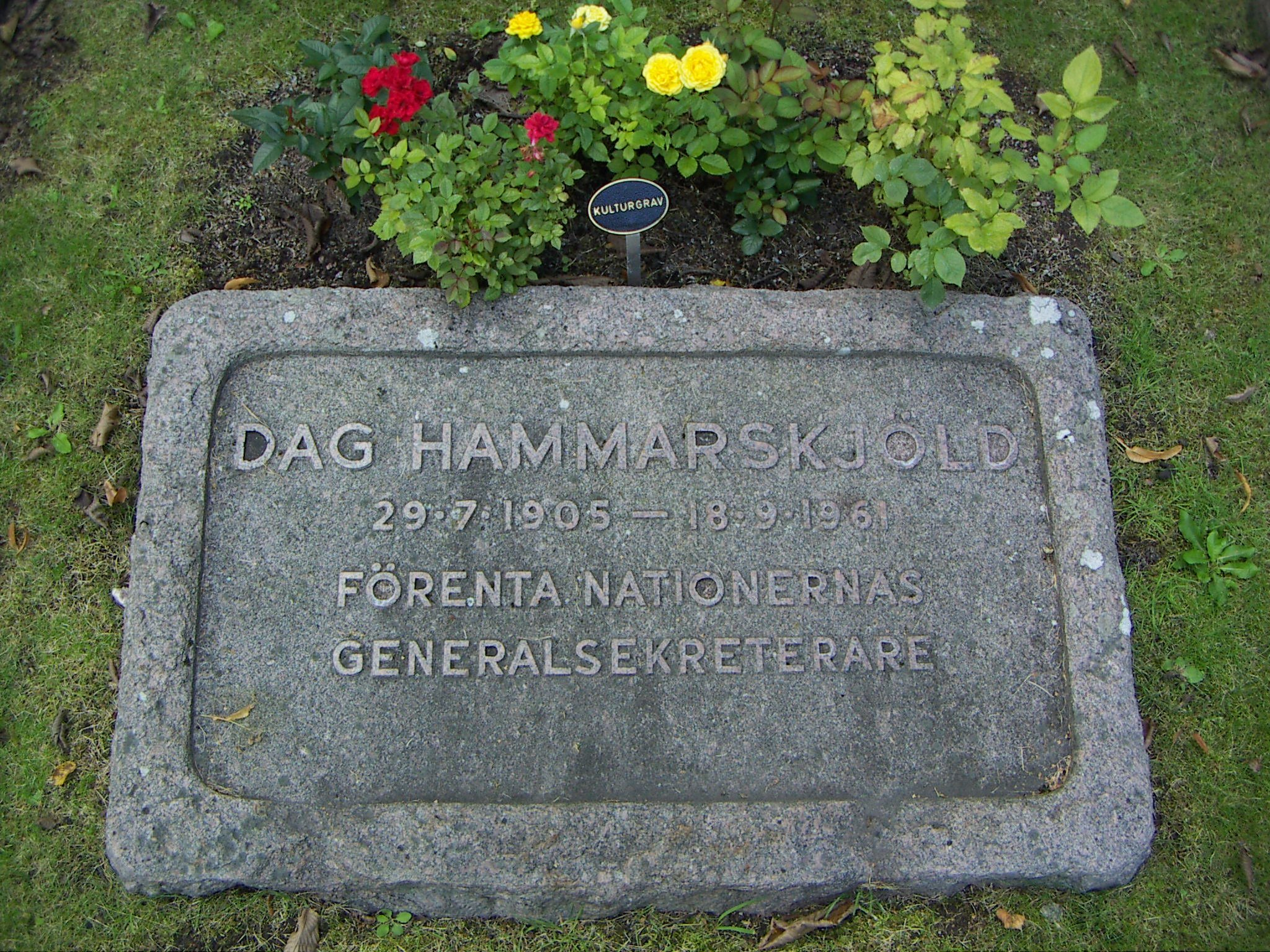
Dag Hammarskjöld

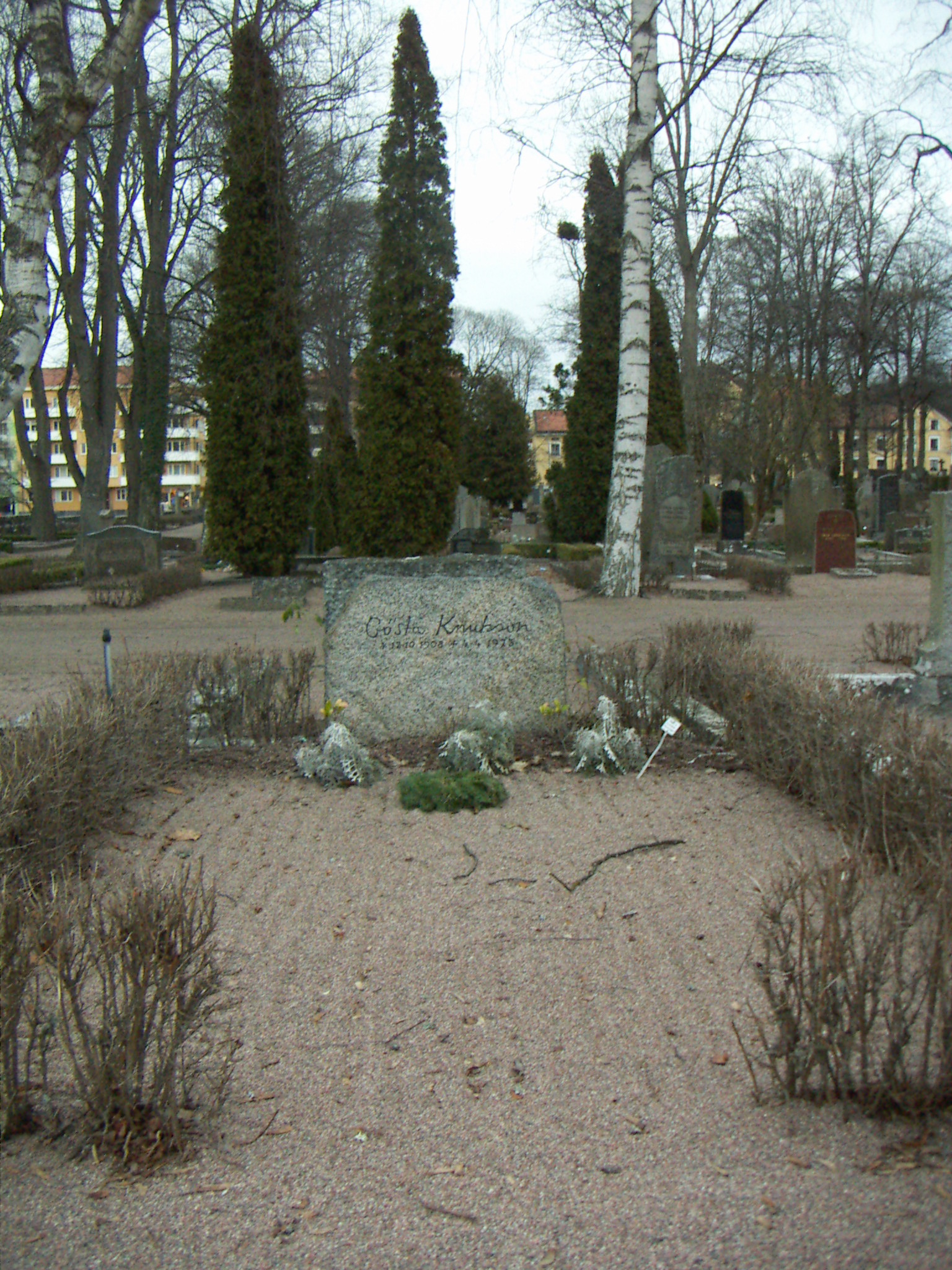
Gösta Knutsson

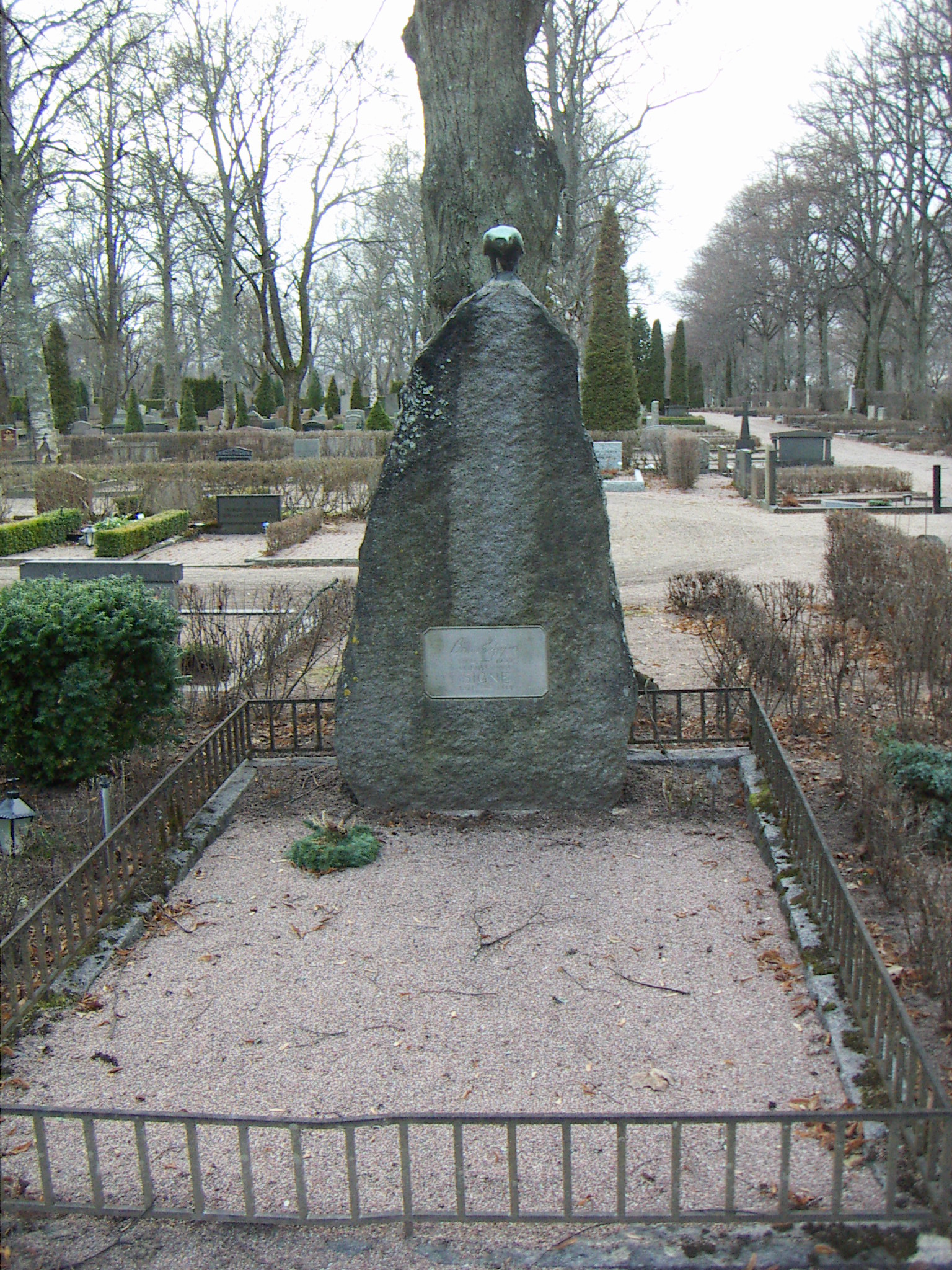
Bruno Liljefors

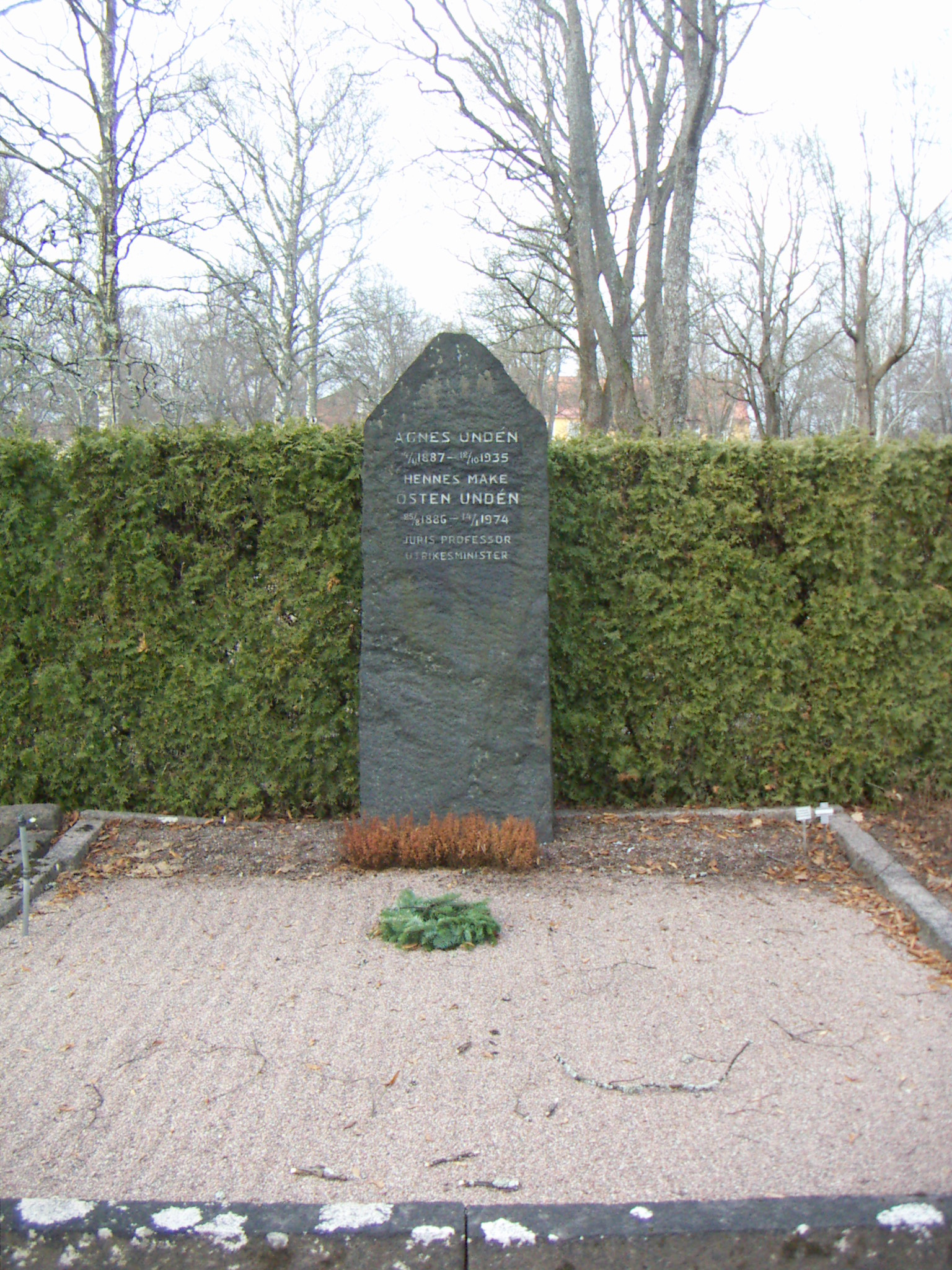
Östen Undén
