= List of diplomatic missions of Sweden =

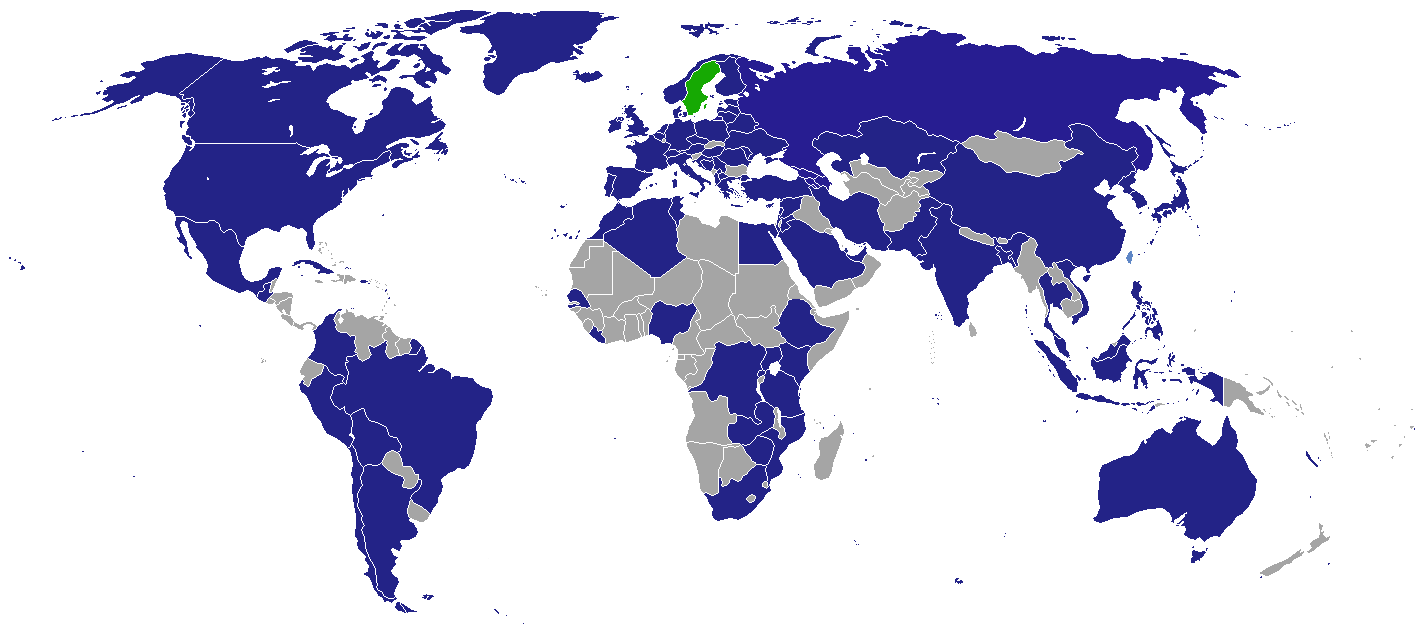
Map of Swedish diplomatic missions

The Kingdom of Sweden has a moderately sized diplomatic network of 87 embassies and 9 consulates general, supplemented by honorary consulates, cultural centres and trade missions. In countries without Swedish representation, Swedish citizens can seek assistance from public officials in the foreign services of any of the other Nordic countries, in accordance with the Helsinki Treaty.

Of note Sweden was the first Western country to have an embassy in Pyongyang. The embassy in Pyongyang continues to provide limited consular services to citizens of several Western countries without a presence in North Korea and acts as the consular protecting power of the United States, Canada, and Australia since 1995.

== History ==
Through the 19th century and the early years of the 20th century, most Swedish diplomatic missions were legations. The ambassador question was dealt with in the council on 25 August 1947. It was decided that some Swedish legations would be elevated to embassies. The first Swedish legations to be elevated to embassies were those in Washington, D.C., London, Paris, Moscow, Nanjing, Copenhagen and Oslo.

In January 2010, the Swedish Foreign Ministry announced that its embassies in Bratislava (Slovakia), Dakar (Senegal), Dublin (Ireland), Ljubljana (Slovenia), Luxembourg (Luxembourg), and Sofia (Bulgaria) would be closed down, while existing section offices in Pristina, Tbilisi, Chișinău, Tirana, Bamako, Ouagadougou, Monrovia, Kigali, La Paz, and Phnom Penh would be upgraded to embassies.

In December 2010, it was announced by the Swedish Foreign Ministry that an additional five embassies would close down; the embassies affected were the ones in Brussels, Belgium, Buenos Aires, Argentina, Hanoi, Vietnam, Kuala Lumpur, Malaysia and Luanda, Angola.

In August 2011, an agreement between the Social Democrats and the governing Reinfeldt Cabinet was announced, with the purpose of keeping the embassies in Argentina, Vietnam, Malaysia and Angola open.

On 30 August 2012, Sweden closed its embassy in Minsk, with the Estonian Embassy charged with representing Swedish interests in Belarus.

On 2 November 2016, the embassy in Lima, Peru, was re-opened. Six days later, on 8 November the embassy in Manila, Philippines, was re-opened, eight years after it was closed down.

In November 2021 the Swedish government announced that it would re-open embassies in Dublin and Brussels, and open a consulate-general in San Francisco. In November 2022, the embassy in Luanda closed and in the same year the embassy in Lima, which had reopened in 2016, also closed.

On 20 June 2024, the Swedish government decided that the embassies in Bamako and Ouagadougou would be closed. For continued effective engagement in the Sahel and West Africa, the government also decided to initiate a process to reopen the embassy in Dakar. The closing is expected to be completed by the end of 2024, while the embassy in Dakar is expected to open in 2025.

The Swedish government announced in February 2025 that it intends to reopen the consulate-general in Houston, United States, and elevate the consulate-general in Brussels to an embassy. In December 2025, the Swedish government decided to reopen a Swedish embassy in Lima in the fall of 2026.

In December 2025, the government decided to close the embassies in Bolivia, Liberia and Zimbabwe in 2026, partly as a result of an increased focus on support for Ukraine. In August 2026, the government decided to open a consulate general in Munich, Germany in 2027.

== Present missions ==
=== Africa ===
Host country	Host city	Mission	Concurrent accreditation	Ref.
Algeria	Algiers	Embassy		
Congo-Kinshasa	Kinshasa	Embassy	Countries: Congo-Brazzaville; Equatorial Guinea; Gabon	
Egypt	Cairo	Embassy		
Ethiopia	Addis Ababa	Embassy	Countries: Djibouti; South Sudan; International Organizations: African Union; Intergovernmental Authority on Development	
Kenya	Nairobi	Embassy	Countries: Comoros; Seychelles; Somalia; International Organizations: United Nations; United Nations Environment Programme; United Nations Human Settlements Programme	
Morocco	Rabat	Embassy		
Mozambique	Maputo	Embassy	Countries: Eswatini; Madagascar	
Nigeria	Abuja	Embassy	Countries: Cameroon; Ghana; International Organizations: Economic Community of West African States	
Rwanda	Kigali	Embassy		
Senegal	Dakar	Embassy		
South Africa	Pretoria	Embassy	Countries: Botswana; Lesotho; Namibia; International Organizations: Southern African Development Community (Note: Accredited as an observer mission.)	
Tanzania	Dar Es Salaam	Embassy		
Tunisia	Tunis	Embassy	Countries: Libya	
Uganda	Kampala	Embassy	Countries: Central African Republic; Chad	
Zambia	Lusaka	Embassy		

=== Americas ===
Host country	Host city	Mission	Concurrent accreditation	Ref.
Argentina	Buenos Aires	Embassy	Countries: Paraguay; Uruguay	
Bolivia	La Paz	Embassy (Note: To be closed within 2026.)		
Brazil	Brasília	Embassy		
Canada	Ottawa	Embassy		
Chile	Santiago de Chile	Embassy		
Colombia	Bogotá	Embassy	Countries: Ecuador; Venezuela	
Cuba	Havana	Embassy		
Guatemala	Guatemala City	Embassy	Countries: Costa Rica; El Salvador; Honduras; Nicaragua; Panama	
Mexico	Mexico City	Embassy		
Peru	Lima	Embassy		
United States	Washington, D.C.	Embassy	International Organizations: Organization of American States	
United States	Houston	Consulate-General	International Organizations: Organization of American States	
United States	New York City	Consulate-General	International Organizations: Organization of American States	
United States	San Francisco	Consulate-General	International Organizations: Organization of American States	

=== Asia ===
Host country	Host city	Mission	Concurrent accreditation	Ref.
Armenia	Yerevan	Embassy		
Azerbaijan	Baku	Embassy		
Bangladesh	Dhaka	Embassy		
China	Beijing	Embassy	Countries: Mongolia	
China	Hong Kong	Consulate-General	Countries: Mongolia	
China	Shanghai	Consulate-General	Countries: Mongolia	
Georgia	Tbilisi	Embassy		
India	New Delhi	Embassy	Countries: Bhutan; Maldives	
India	Mumbai	Consulate-General (Note: Originally established in Calcutta during the time of the British Raj. Was moved to Bombay in 1942, and was closed down in 1948. Reopened in 2012.)	Countries: Bhutan; Maldives	
Indonesia	Jakarta	Embassy	Countries: Papua New Guinea; Timor-Leste; International Organizations: Association of Southeast Asian Nations	
Iran	Tehran	Embassy		
Iraq	Erbil	Embassy section office		
Israel	Tel Aviv	Embassy		
Japan	Tokyo	Embassy	Countries: Marshall Islands; Micronesia; Palau	
Jordan	Amman	Embassy		
Kazakhstan	Astana	Embassy		
Lebanon	Beirut	Embassy		
Malaysia	Kuala Lumpur	Embassy		
North Korea	Pyongyang	Embassy		
Pakistan	Islamabad	Embassy		
Palestine	Jerusalem	Consulate-General (Note: Although officially titled as a consular mission in Jerusalem, it is physically located in Sheikh Jarrah, East Jerusalem, and is accredited to the territories that comprise the State of Palestine: the West Bank and the Gaza Strip.)		
Philippines	Manila	Embassy		
Qatar	Doha	Embassy		
Republic of China (Taiwan)	Taipei	Trade & Invest Council		
Saudi Arabia	Riyadh	Embassy	Countries: Oman; Yemen	
Singapore	Singapore	Embassy	Countries: Brunei	
South Korea	Seoul	Embassy		
Syria	Damascus	Embassy		
Thailand	Bangkok	Embassy	Countries: Cambodia; Laos; Myanmar	
Turkey	Ankara	Embassy		
Turkey	Istanbul	Consulate-General		
United Arab Emirates	Abu Dhabi	Embassy	Countries: Bahrain; Kuwait	
Vietnam	Hanoi	Embassy		

=== Europe ===
Host country	Host city	Mission	Concurrent accreditation	Ref.
Albania	Tirana	Embassy		
Austria	Vienna	Embassy	Countries: Slovakia; International Organizations: International Atomic Energy Agency; United Nations; United Nations Industrial Development Organization; United Nations Office on Drugs and Crime	
Belarus	Minsk	Embassy		
Belgium	Brussels	Embassy	Countries: Luxembourg	
Bosnia and Herzegovina	Sarajevo	Embassy		
Croatia	Zagreb	Embassy		
Cyprus	Nicosia	Embassy		
Czech Republic	Prague	Embassy		
Denmark	Copenhagen	Embassy		
Estonia	Tallinn	Embassy		
Finland	Helsinki	Embassy		
Finland	Mariehamn	Consulate-General		
France	Paris	Embassy	Countries: Monaco	
Germany	Berlin (Note: The Swedish legation in Berlin was moved to Cologne after the World War II, and in the 1950s, to Bonn, the provisional capital of West Germany. In Bonn the legation was elevated as an embassy, and would remain here until years after the reunification of Germany in 1990; it was finally transferred to Berlin in 1999.)	Embassy		
Greece	Athens	Embassy		
Holy See	Rome	Chancery (Note: The Swedish Ambassador to the Holy See is based in Stockholm. However, Sweden maintains a chancery of the Holy See in Rome, outside Vatican territory.)		
Hungary	Budapest	Embassy	Countries: Slovenia	
Iceland	Reykjavík	Embassy		
Ireland	Dublin	Embassy		
Italy	Rome	Embassy	Countries: San Marino; International Organizations: Food and Agriculture Organization; International Fund for Agricultural Development; World Food Programme	
Kosovo	Pristina	Embassy		
Latvia	Riga	Embassy		
Lithuania	Vilnius	Embassy		
Moldova	Chișinău	Embassy		
Netherlands	The Hague	Embassy	International Organizations: International Court of Justice; International Criminal Court; Organisation for the Prohibition of Chemical Weapons	
North Macedonia	Skopje	Embassy		
Norway	Oslo	Embassy		
Poland	Warsaw	Embassy		
Portugal	Lisbon	Embassy	Countries: Cape Verde; Guinea-Bissau	
Romania	Bucharest	Embassy		
Russia	Moscow	Embassy		
Serbia	Belgrade	Embassy	Countries: Montenegro	
Spain	Madrid	Embassy	Countries: Andorra	
Switzerland	Bern	Embassy	Countries: Liechtenstein	
Ukraine	Kyiv	Embassy		
United Kingdom	London	Embassy		

=== Oceania ===
Host country	Host city	Mission	Concurrent accreditation	Ref.
Australia	Canberra	Embassy	Countries: Fiji; New Zealand; Tonga; Tuvalu	

=== Multilateral organizations ===
Organization	Host city	Host country	Mission	Concurrent accreditation	Ref.
Council of Europe	Strasbourg	France	Permanent Representation		
European Union	Brussels	Belgium	Permanent Representation		
NATO	Brussels	Belgium	Permanent Representation		
OECD	Paris	France	Delegation	International Organizations: UNESCO	
OSCE	Vienna	Austria	Delegation		
United Nations	New York City	United States	Permanent Mission		
United Nations	Geneva	Switzerland	Permanent Mission	International Organizations: Conference on Disarmament; International Labour Organization; World Health Organization; World Trade Organization	

== Gallery ==
=== Embassies ===
Building housing the embassy in Athens

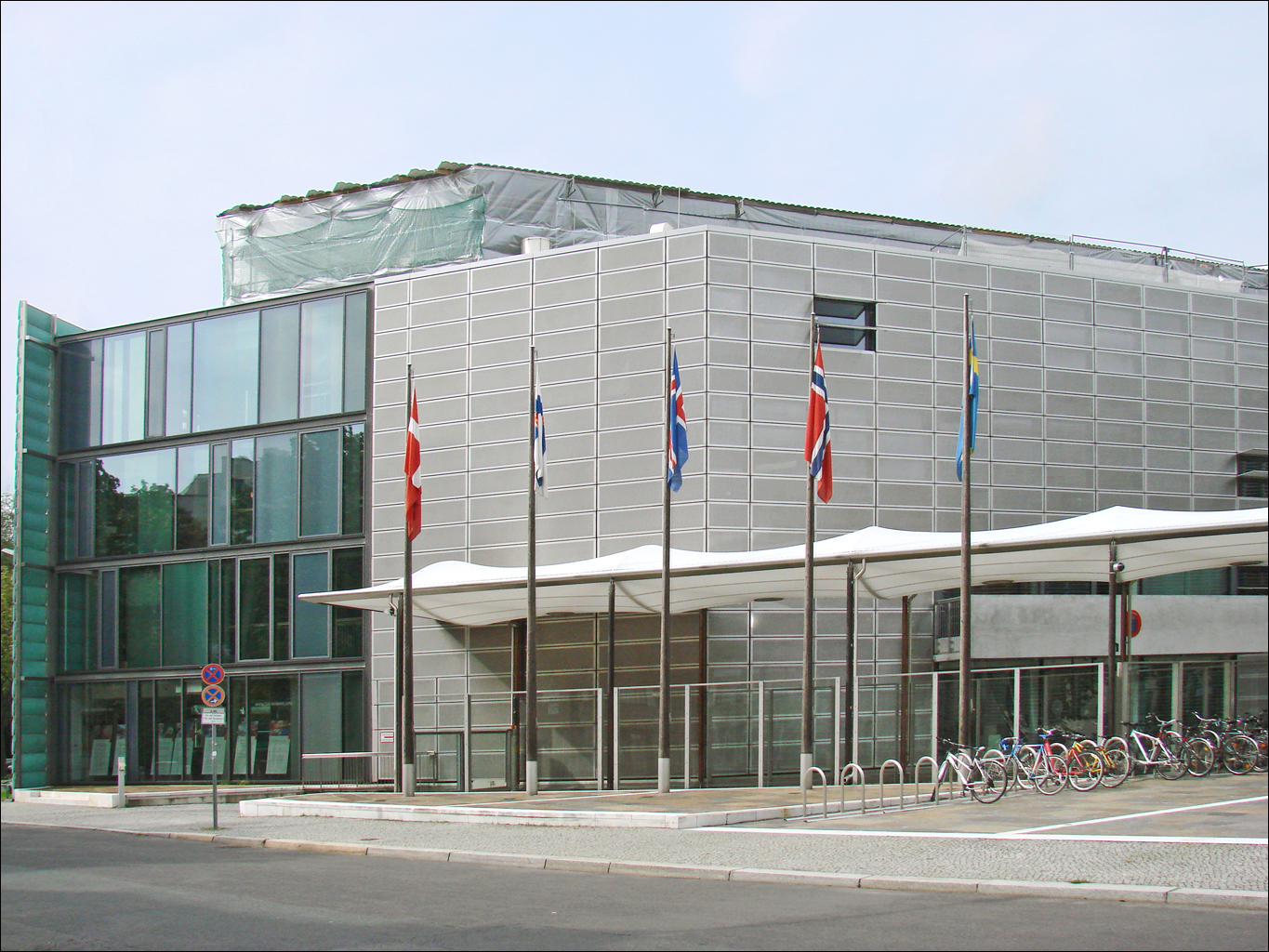
Embassy in Berlin

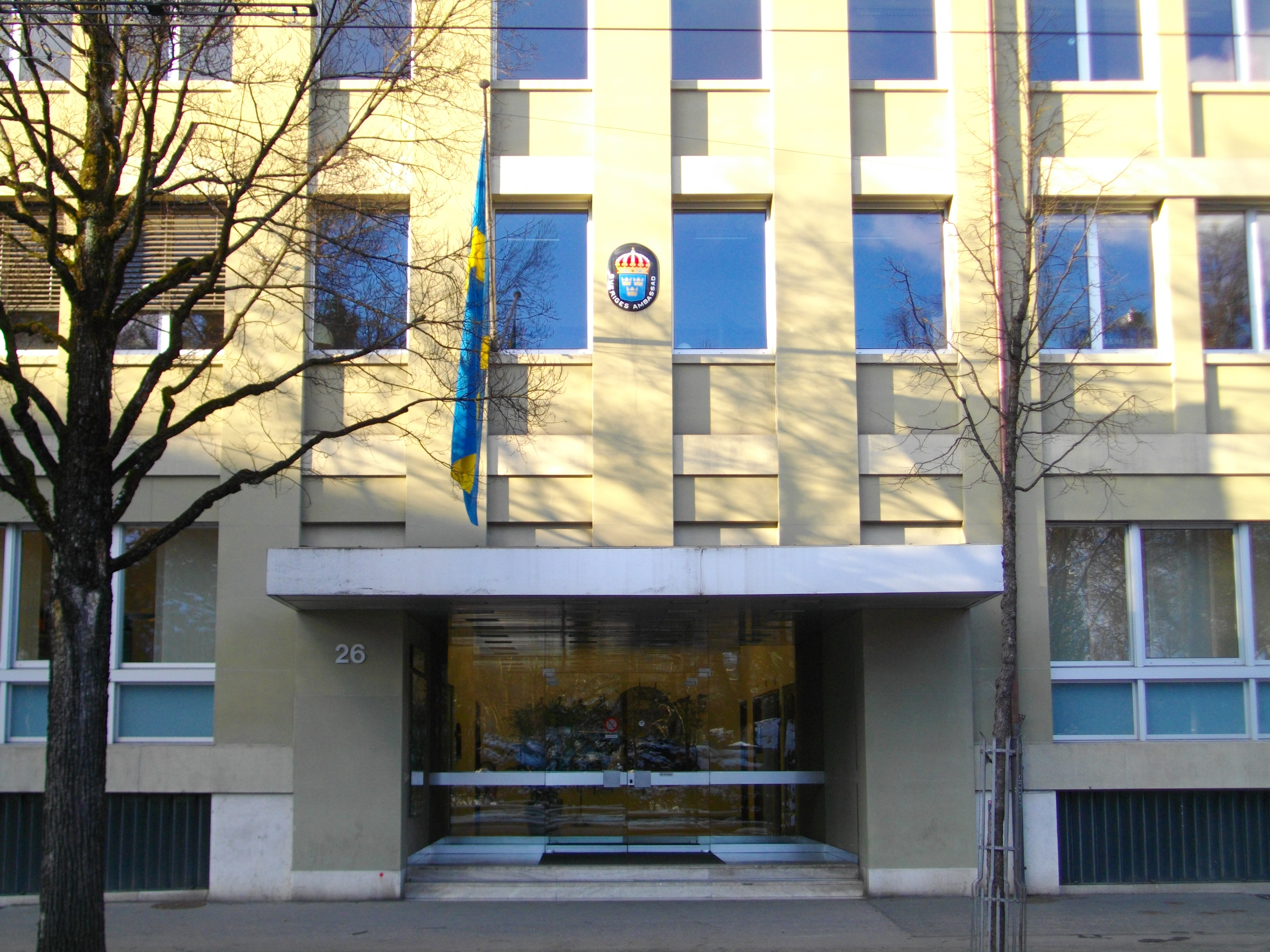
Embassy in Bern

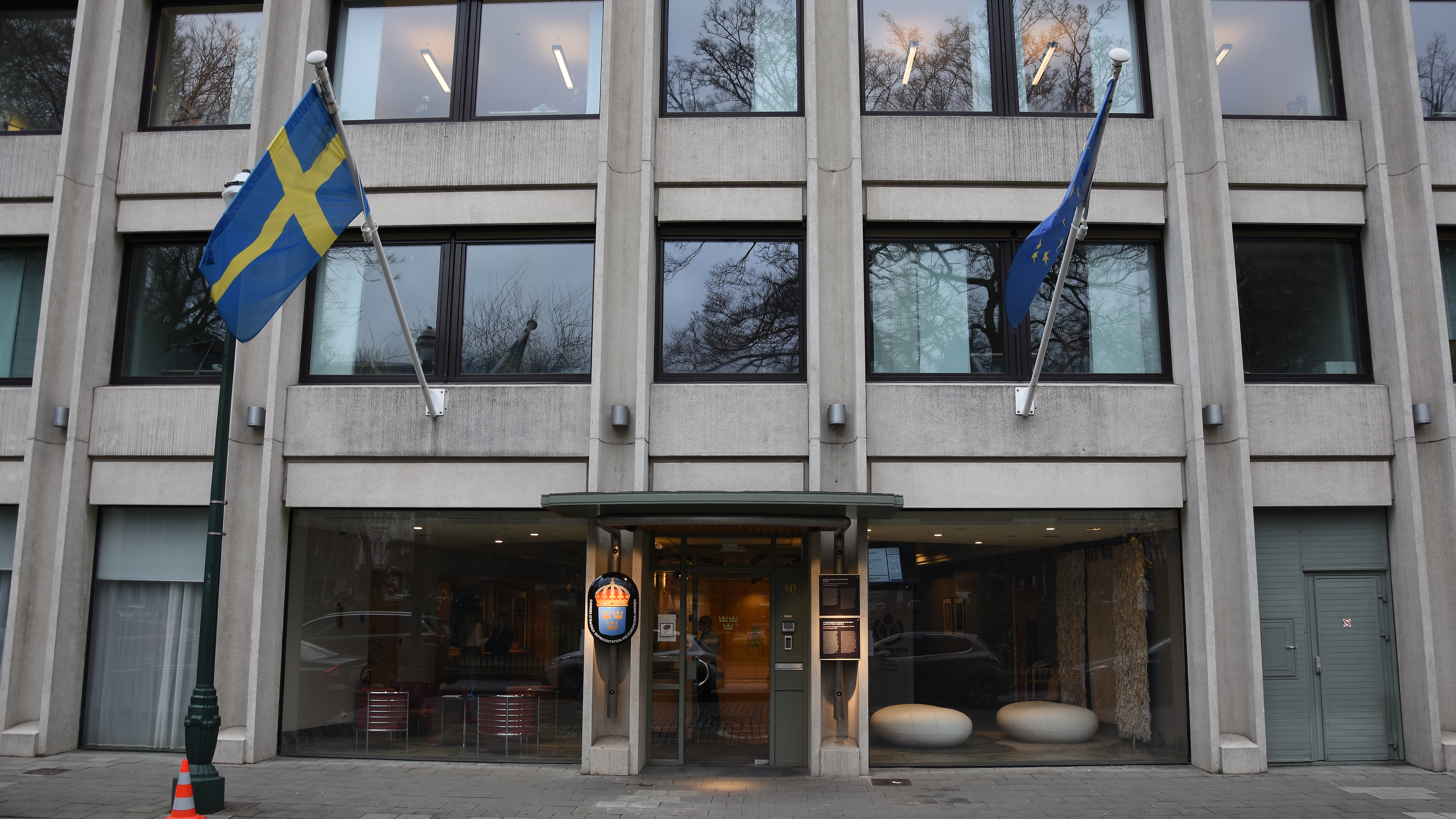
Embassy in Brussels

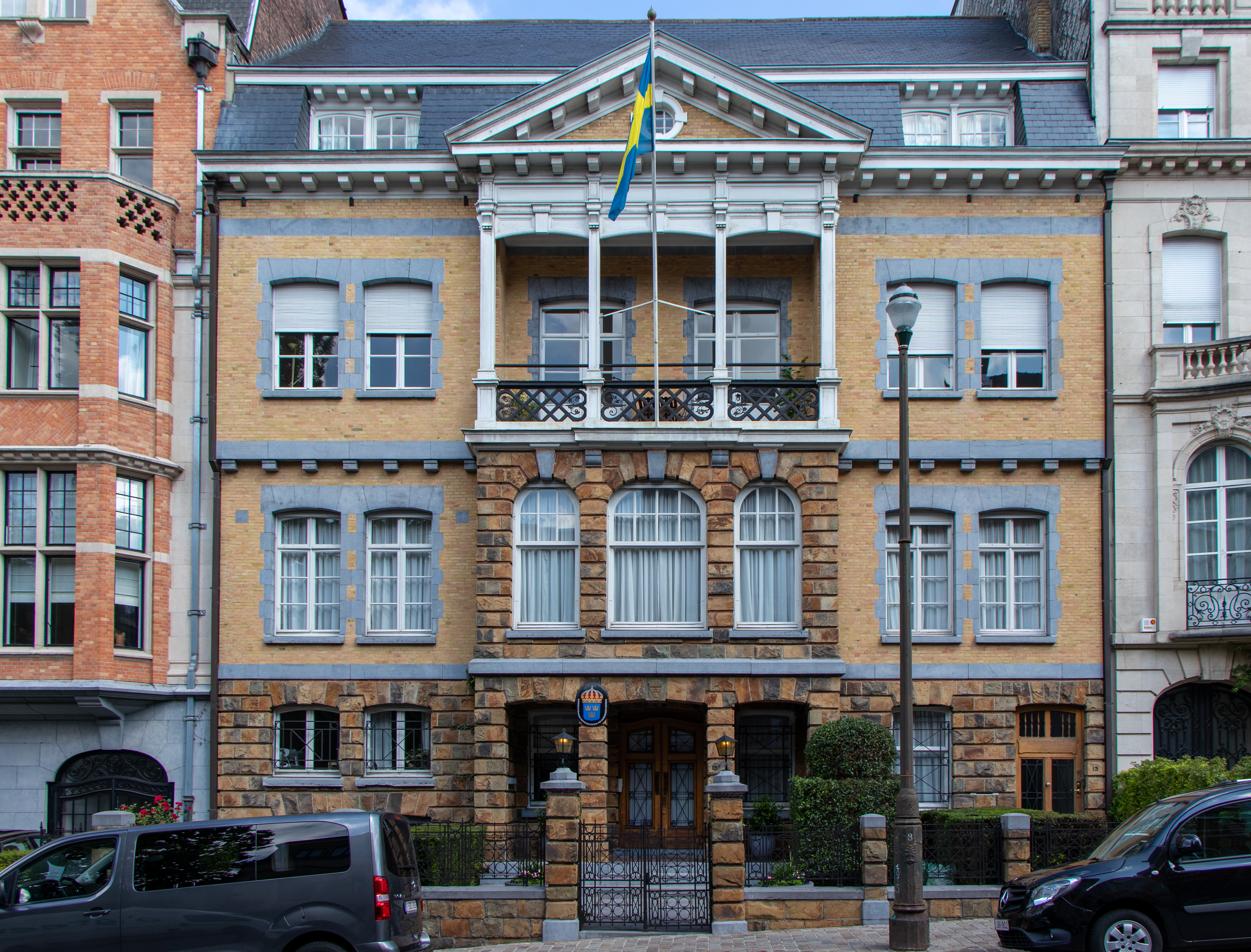
Permanent Mission to the European Union in Brussels

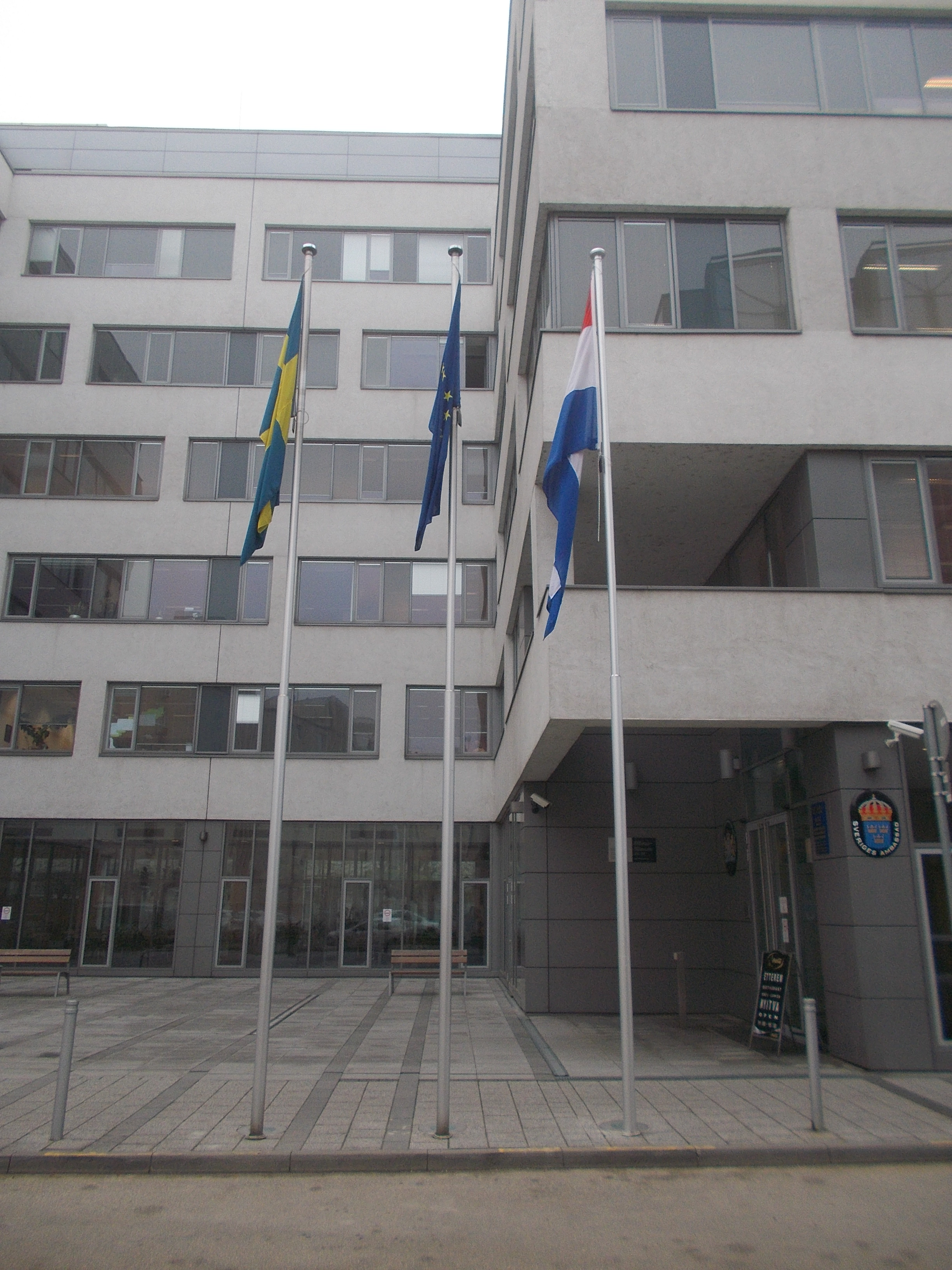
Embassy in Budapest

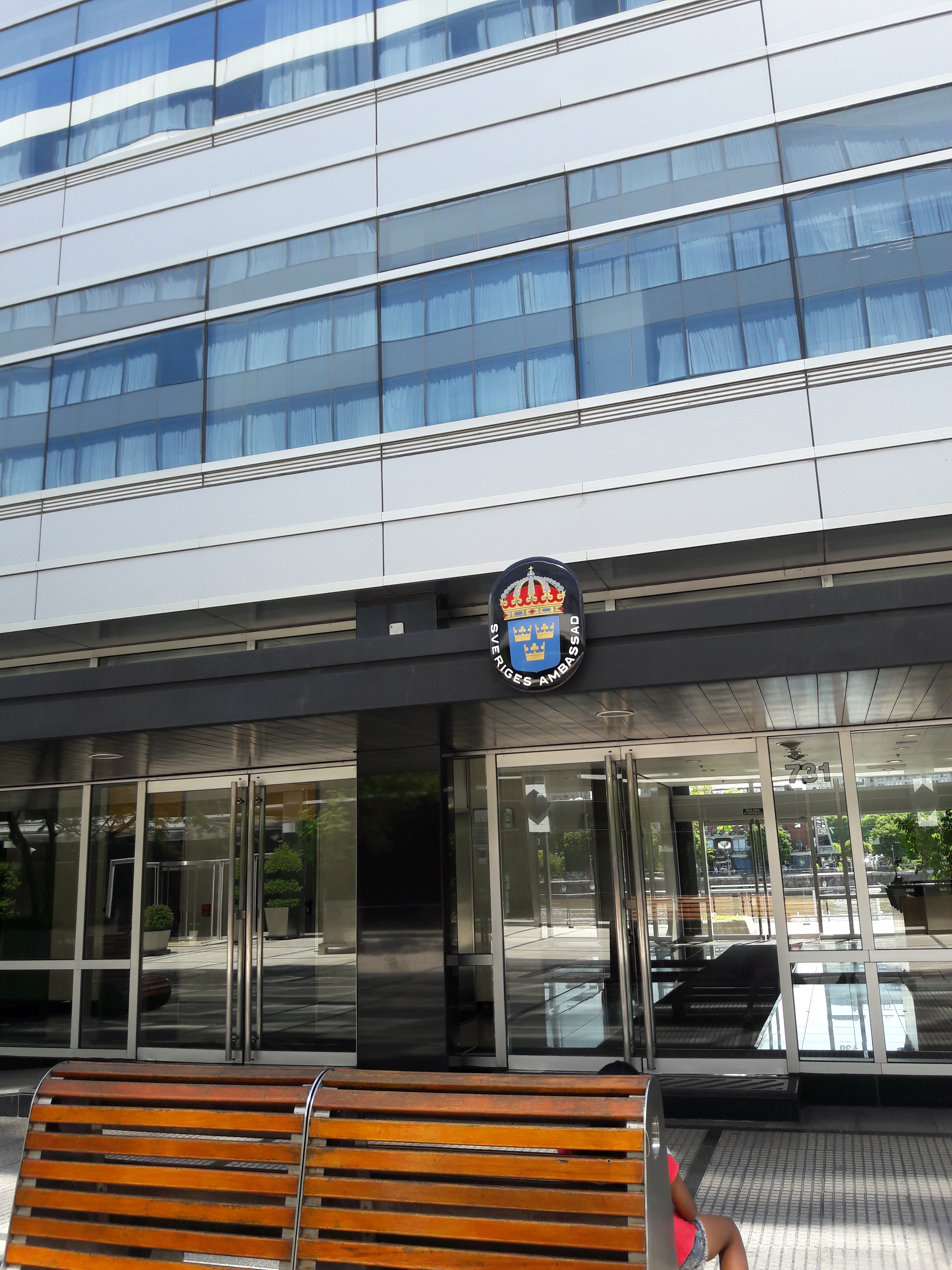
Embassy in Buenos Aires

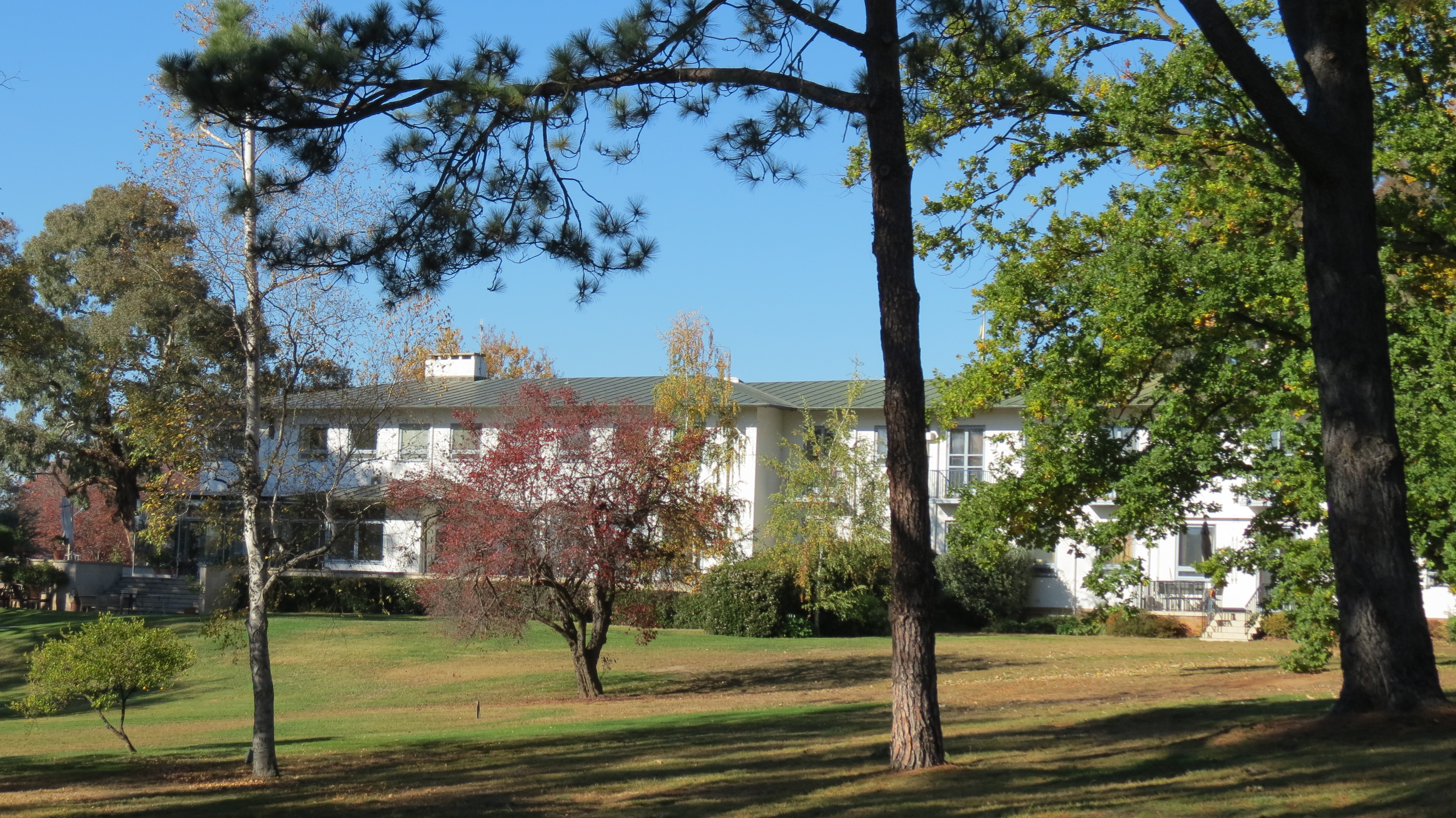
Embassy in Canberra

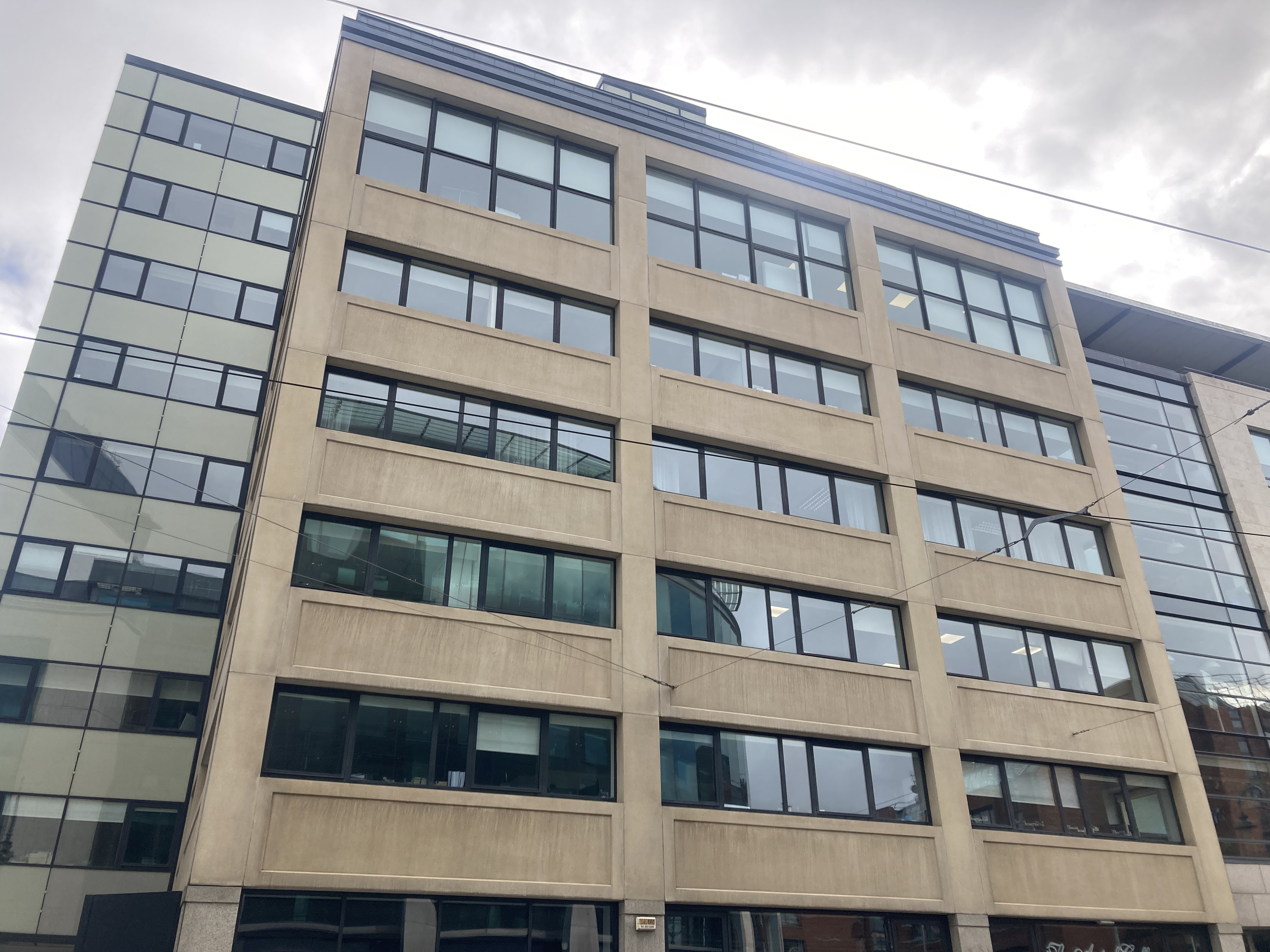
Former Embassy in Dublin

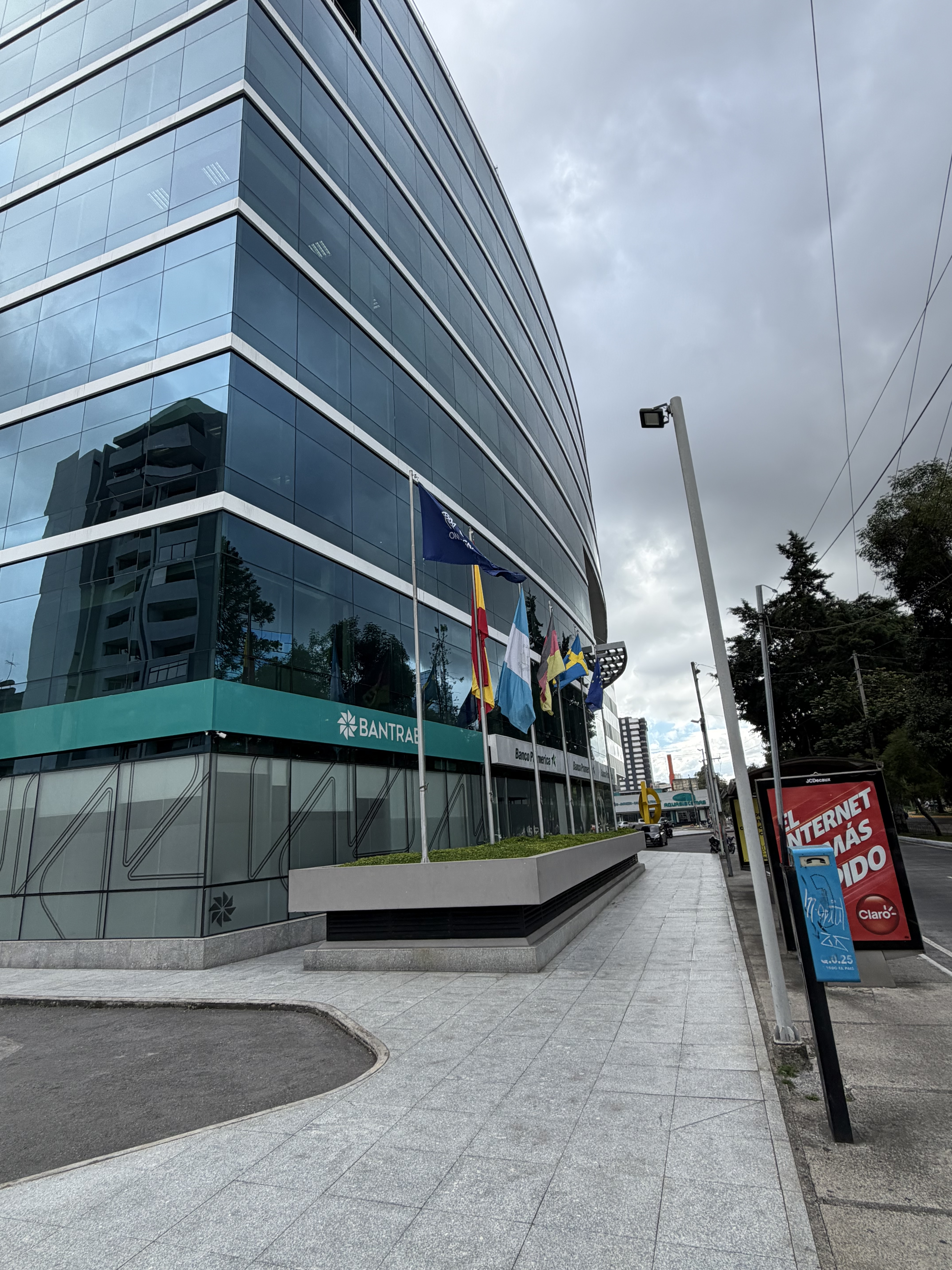
Building hosting the Embassy in Guatemala City

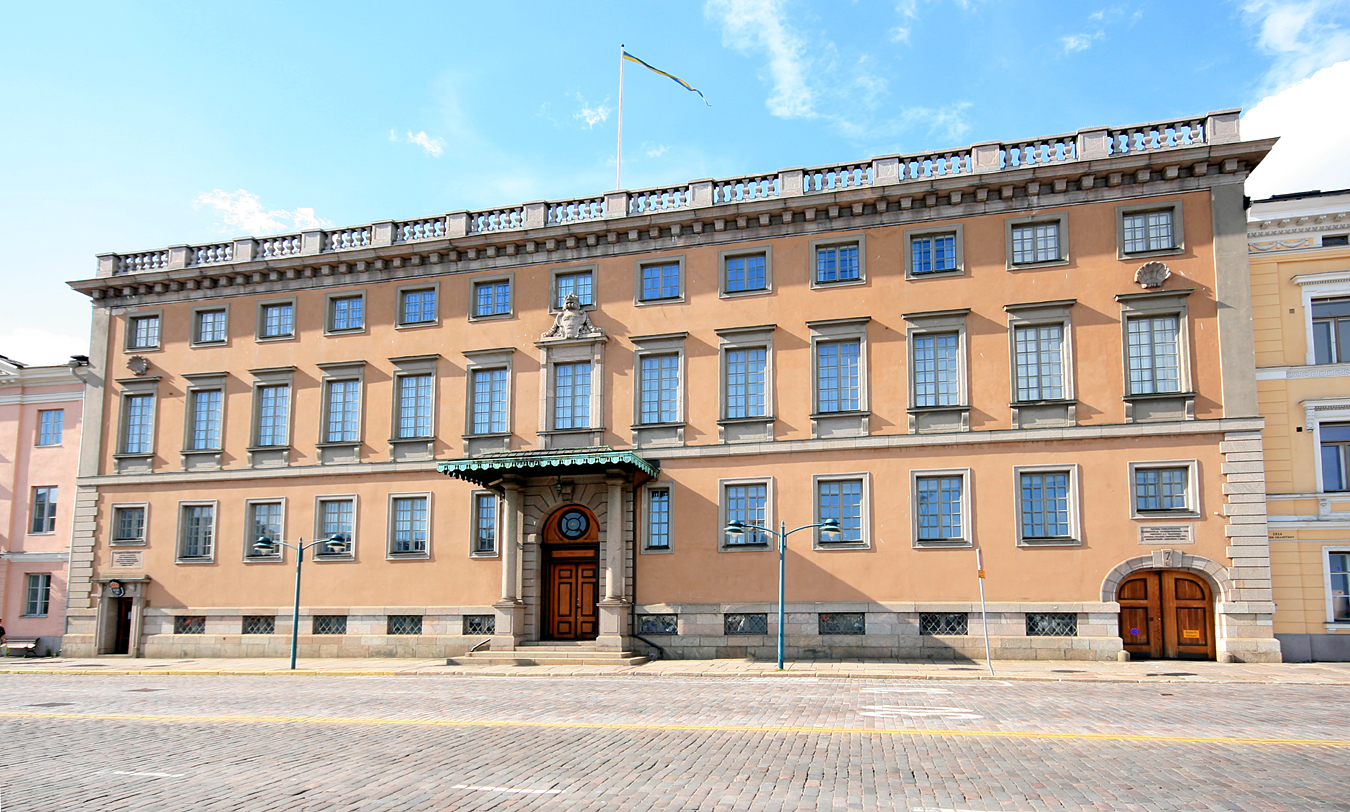
Embassy in Helsinki

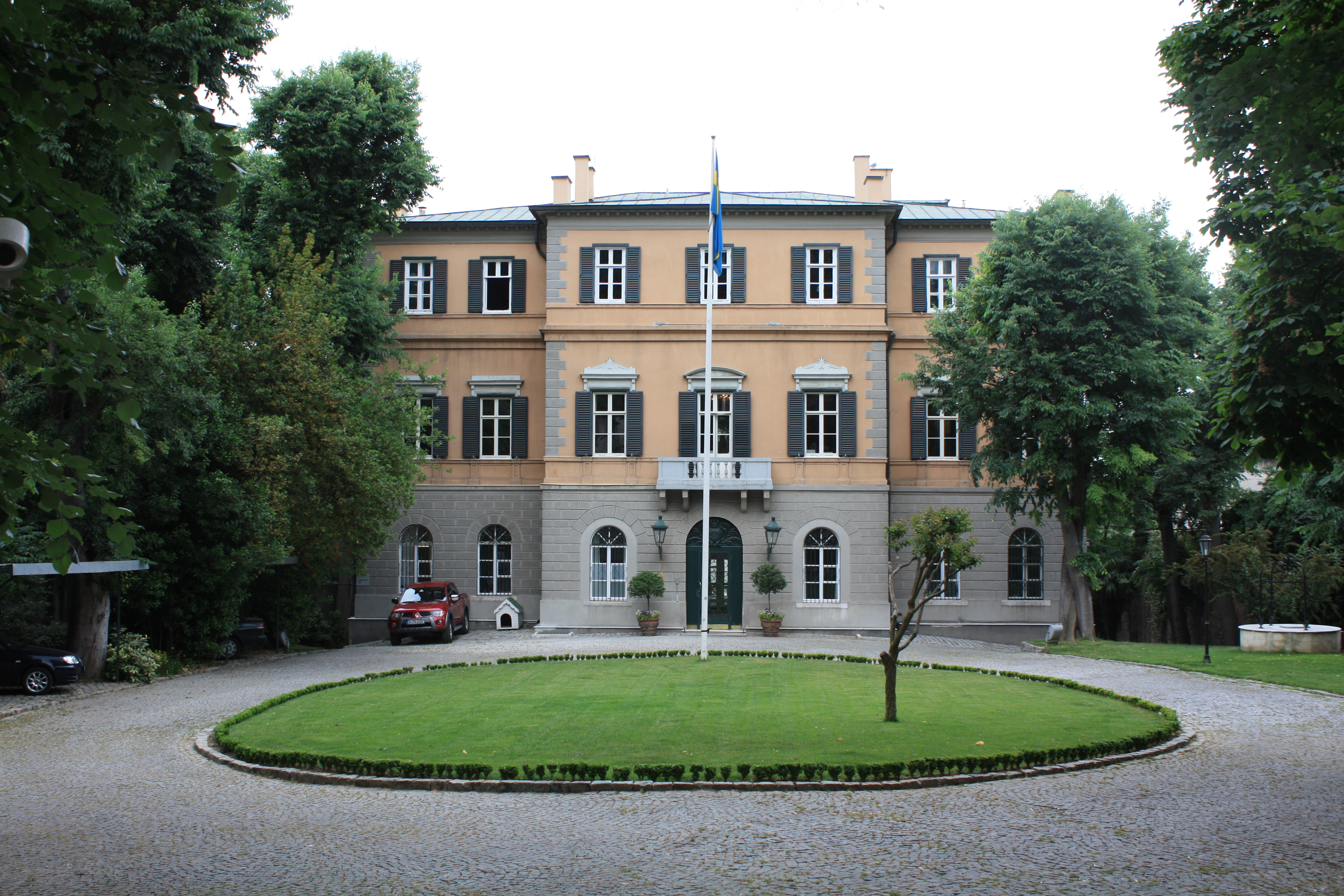
Consulate-General in Istanbul

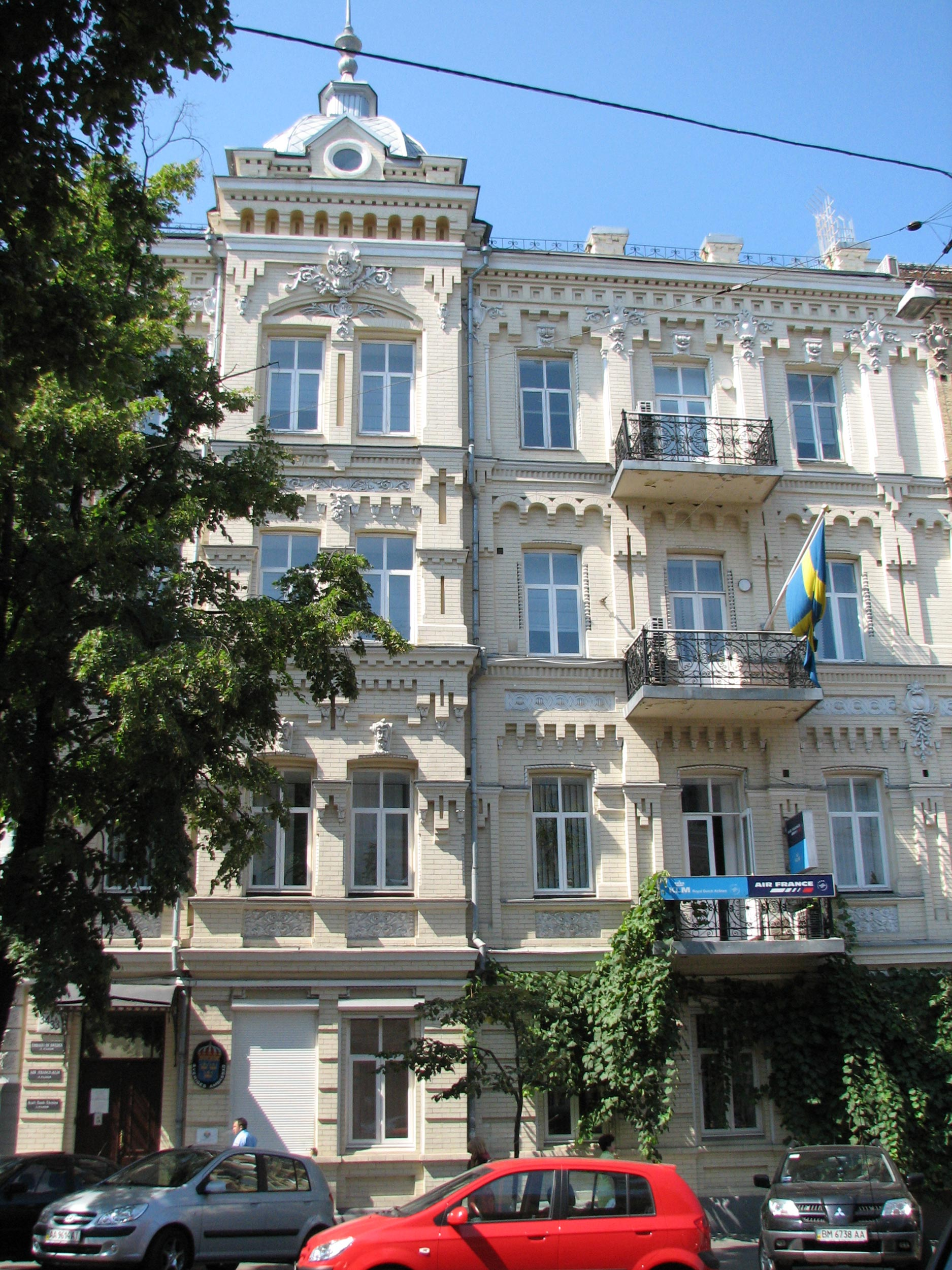
Embassy in Kyiv

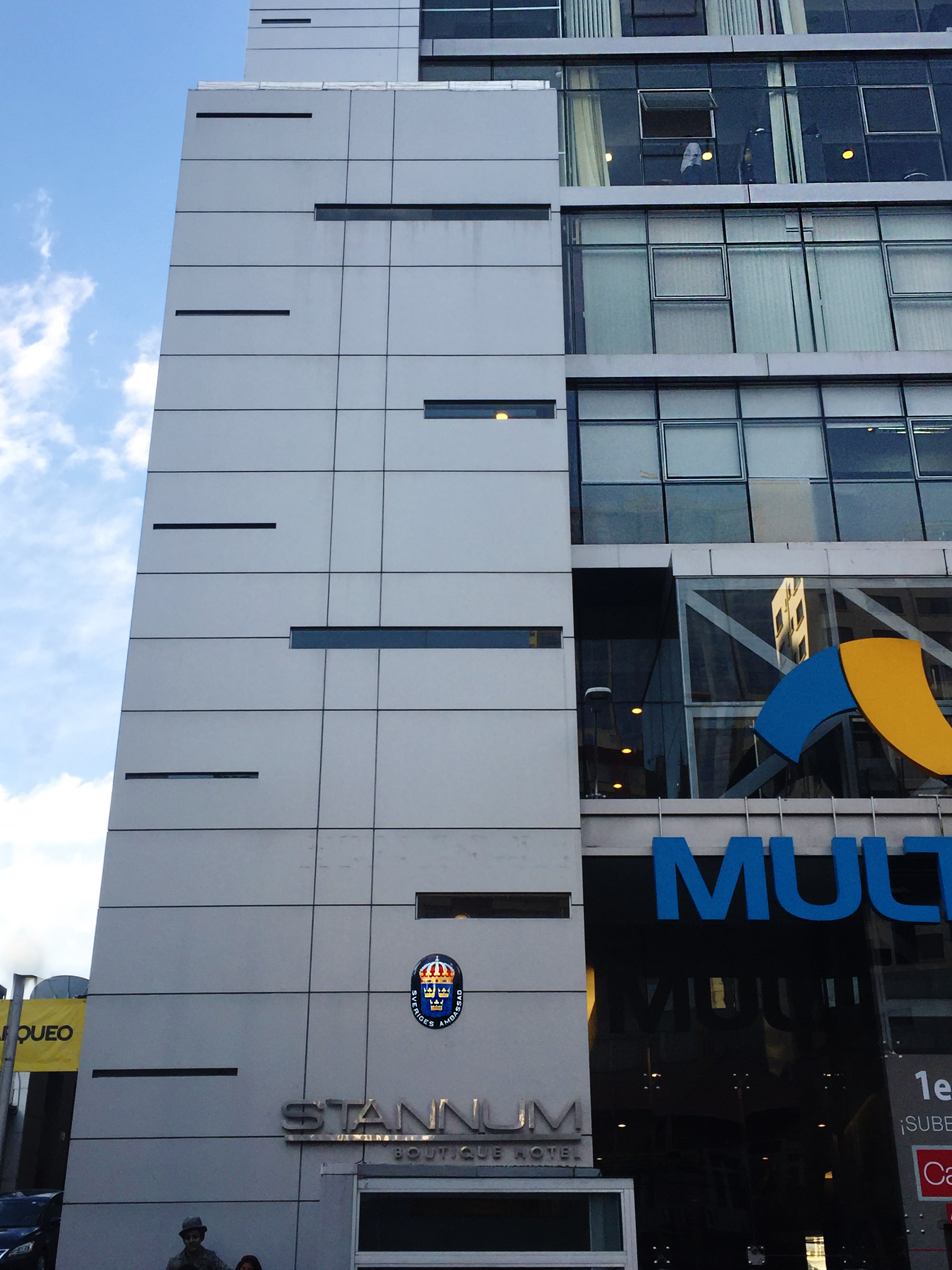
Embassy in La Paz

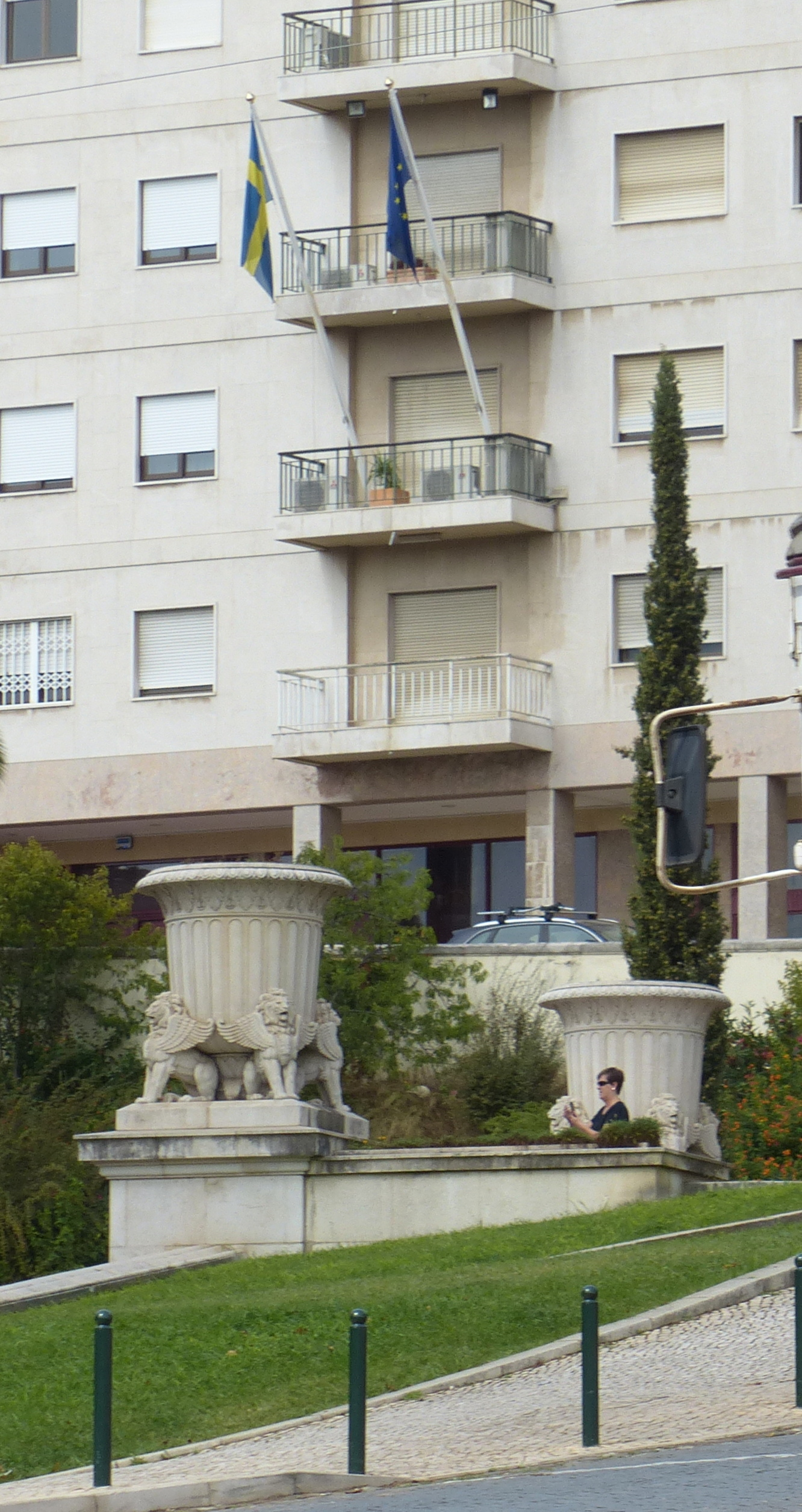
Embassy in Lisbon

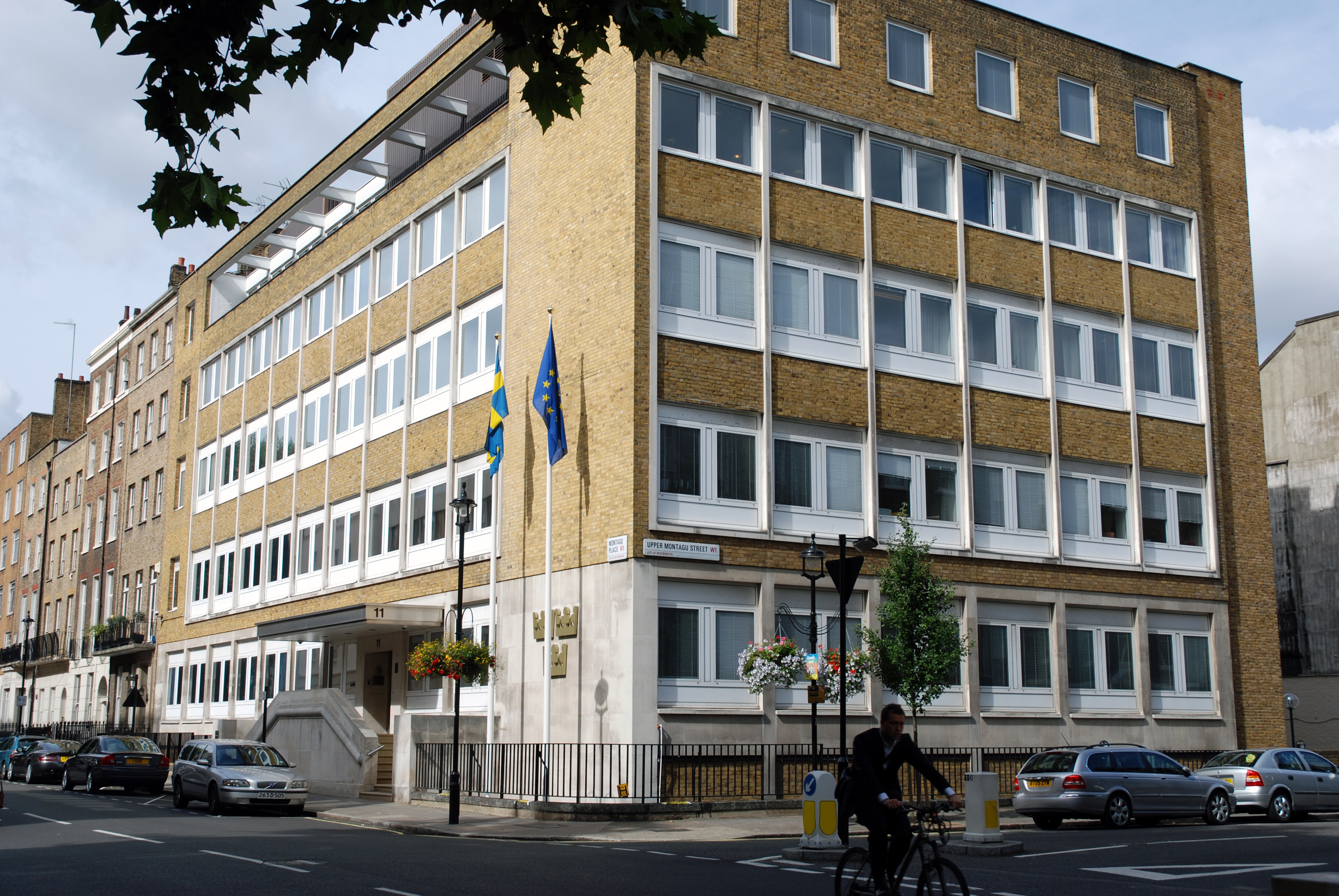
Embassy in London

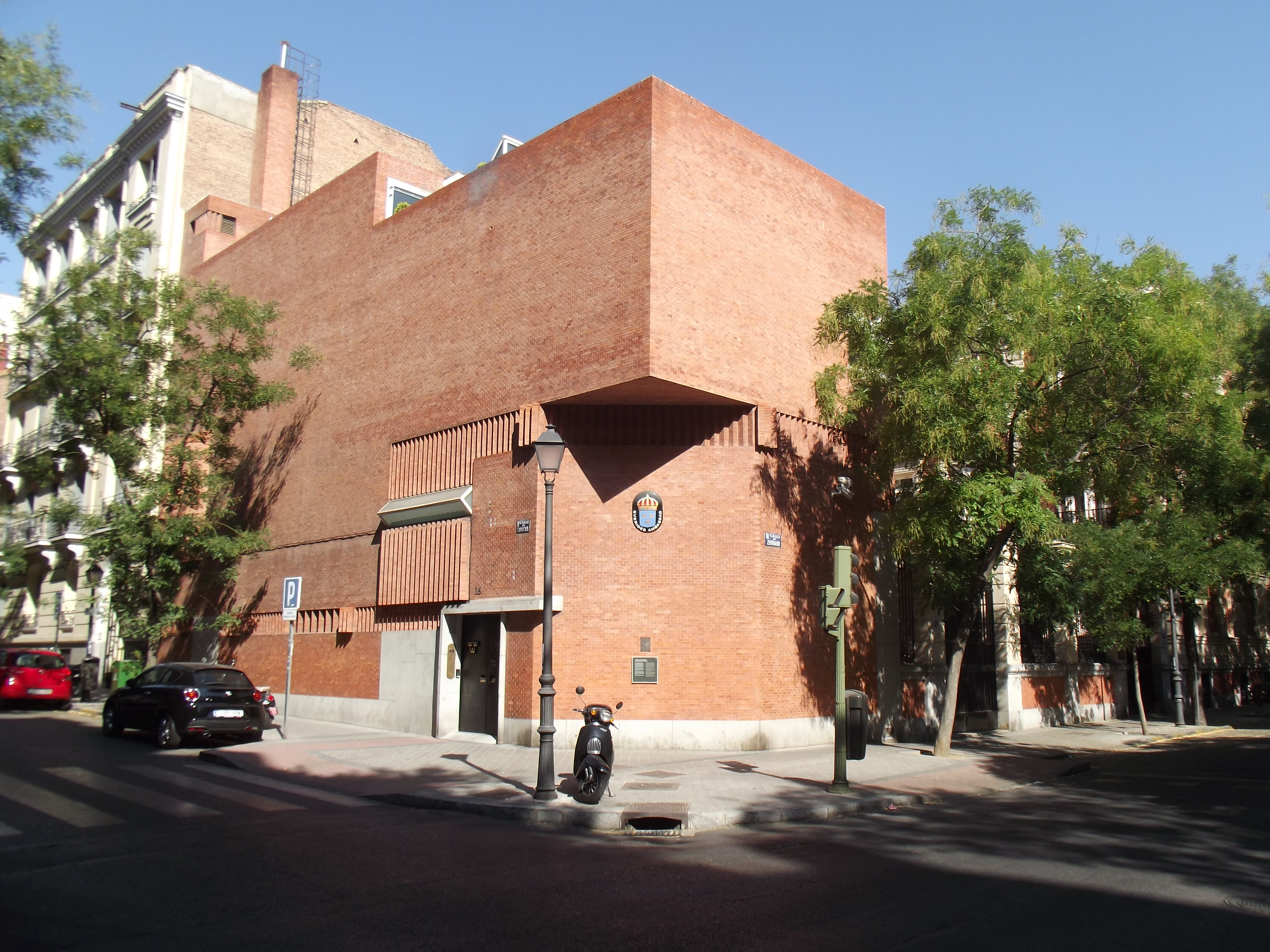
Embassy in Madrid

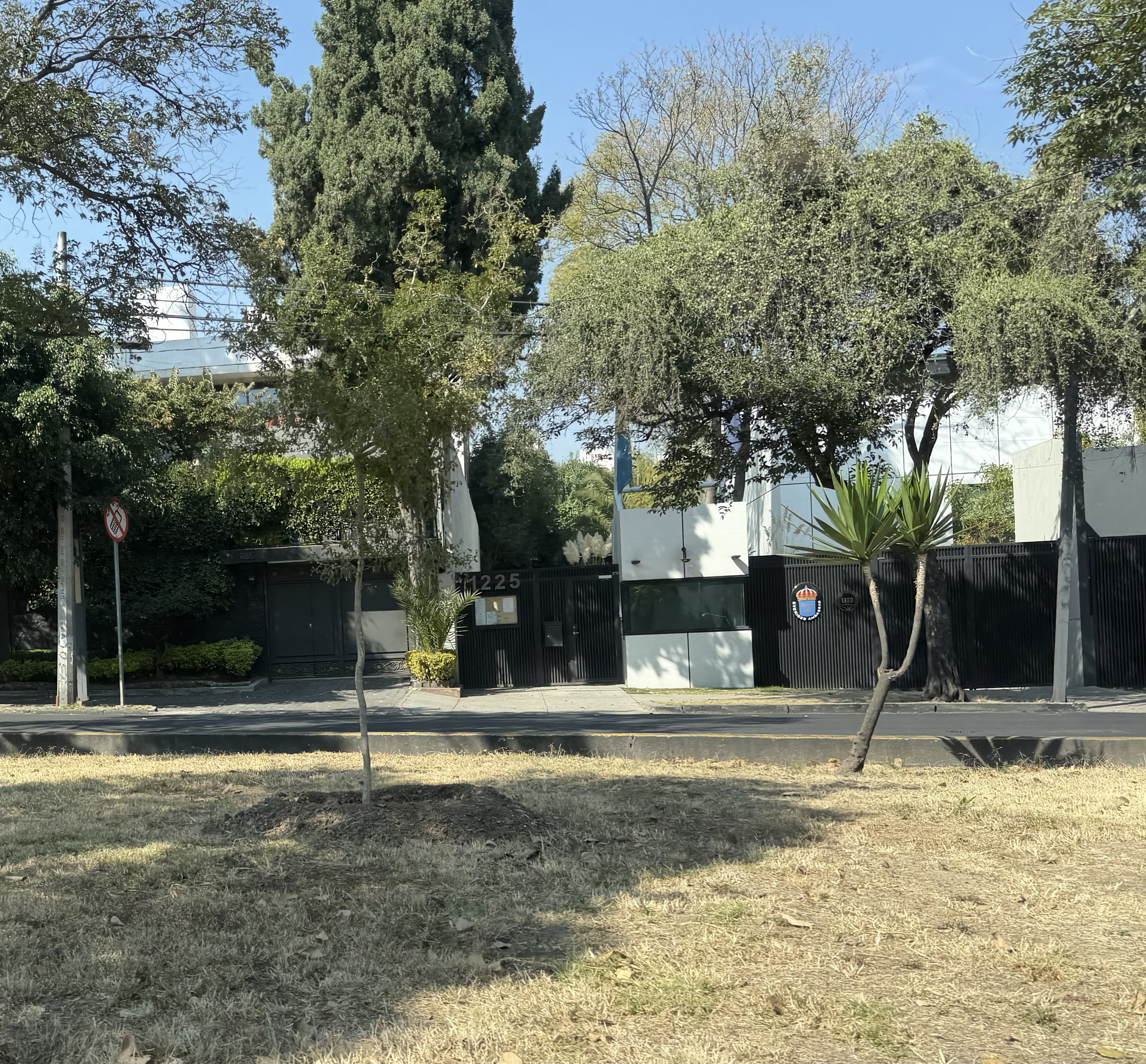
Embassy in Mexico City

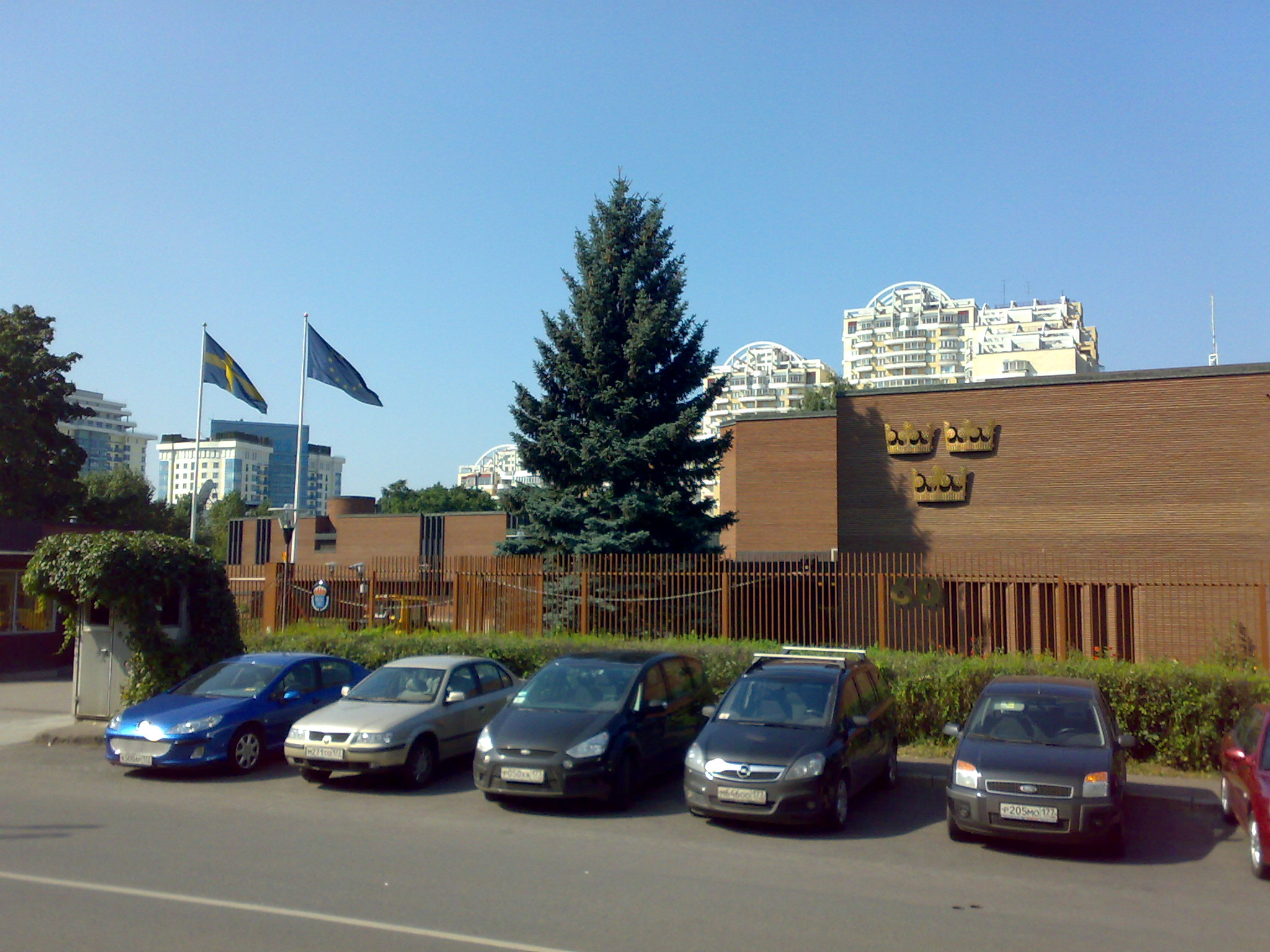
Embassy in Moscow

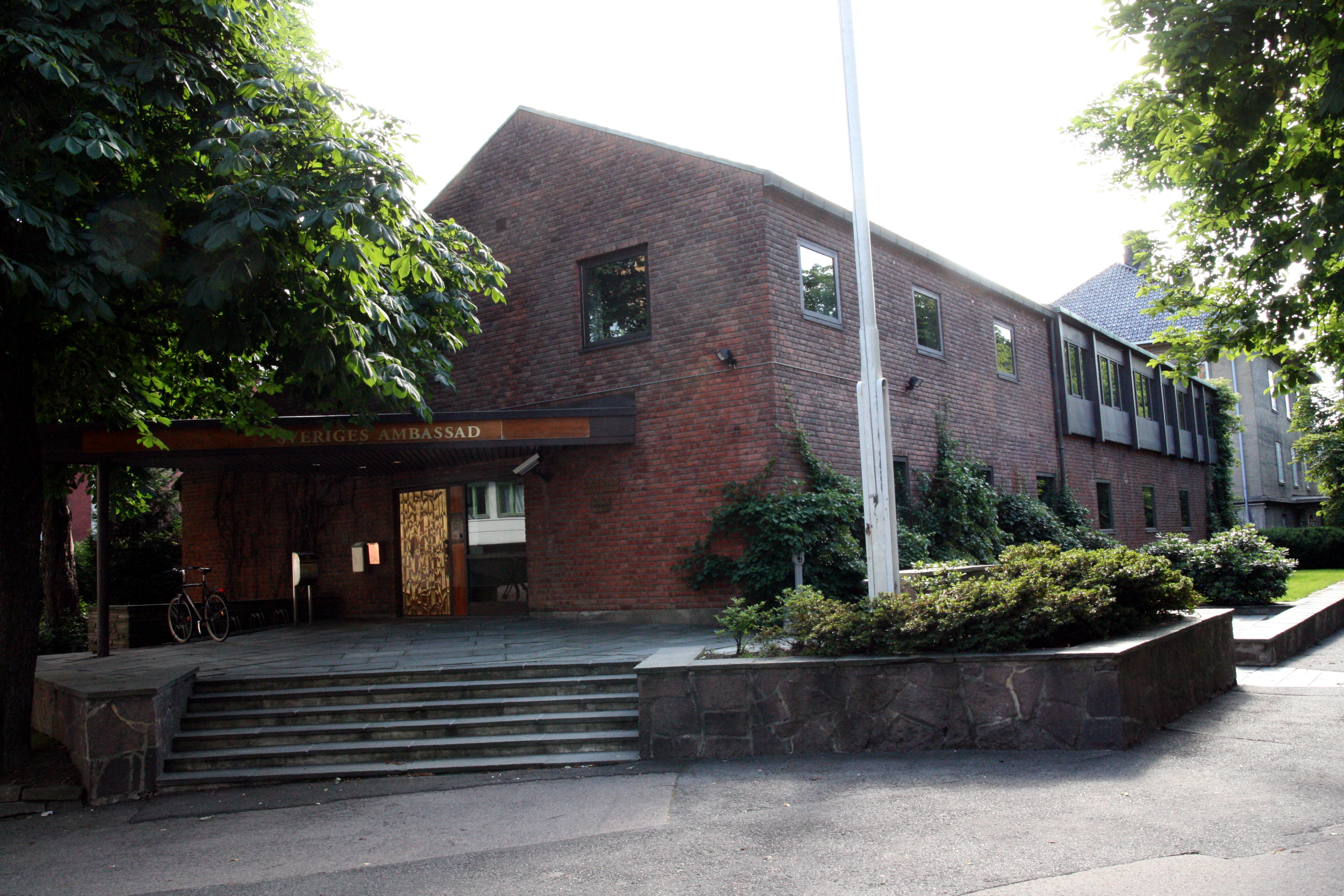
Former Embassy in Oslo

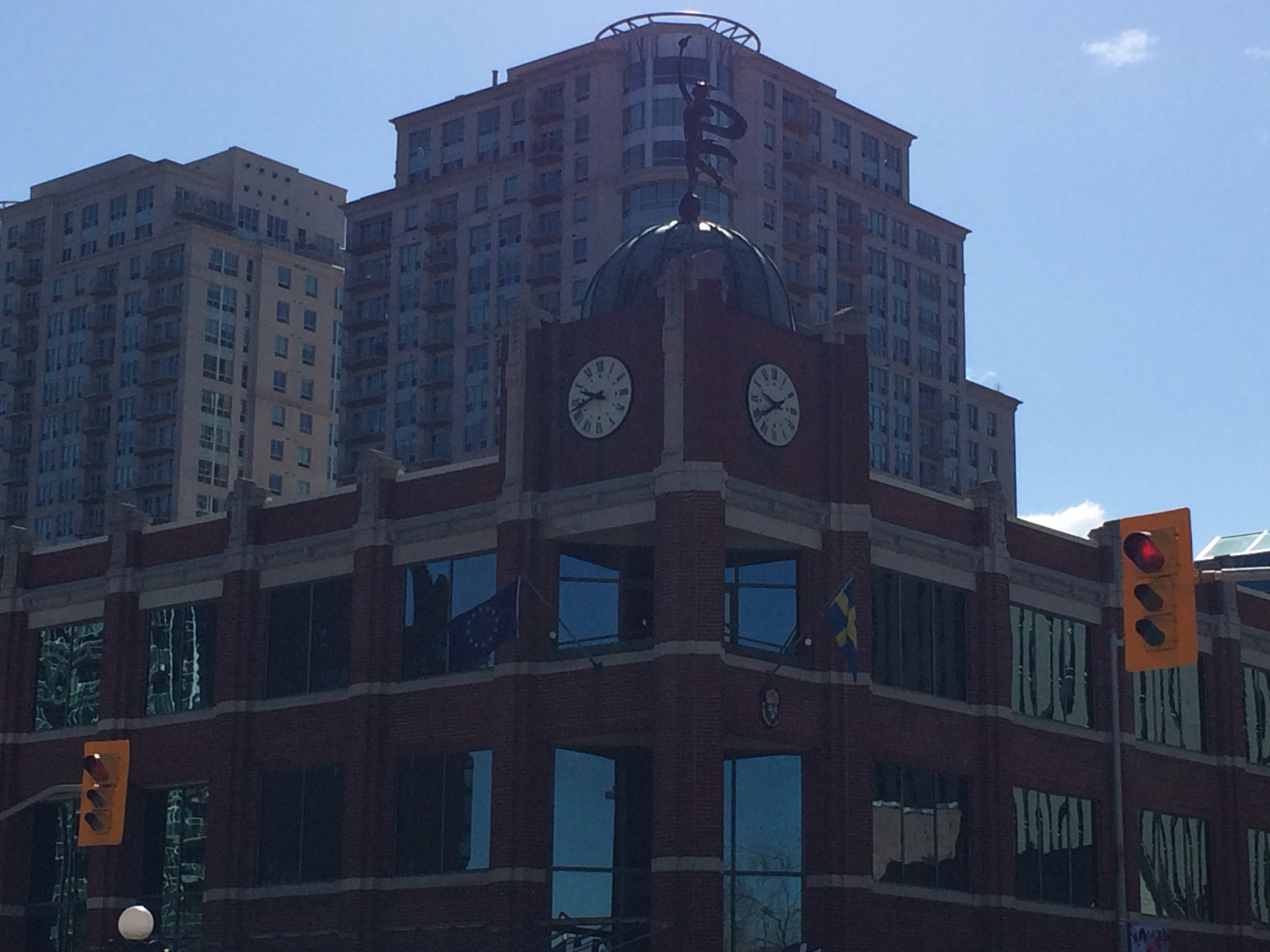
Embassy in Ottawa

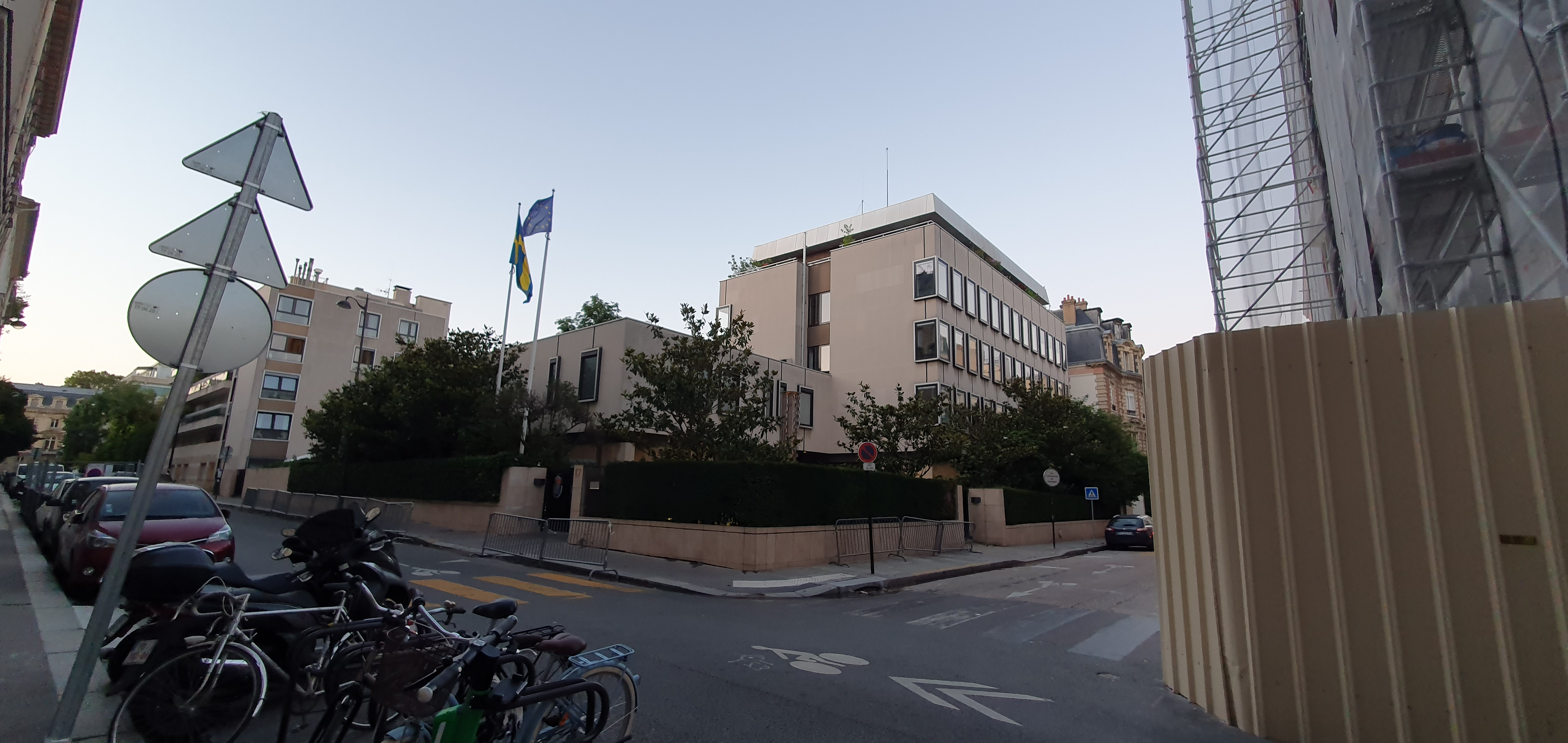
Embassy in Paris

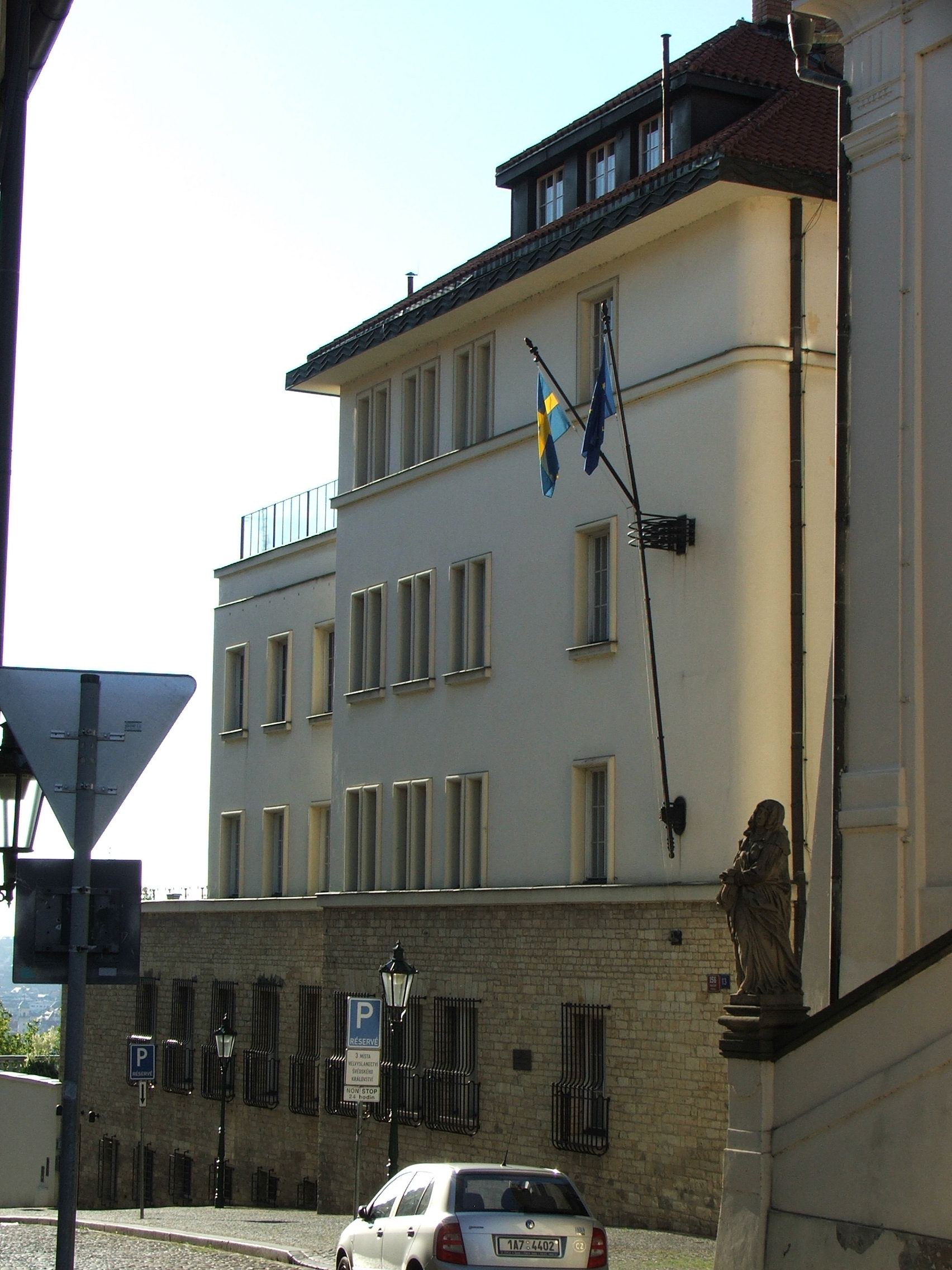
Embassy in Prague

Embassy in Pyongyang

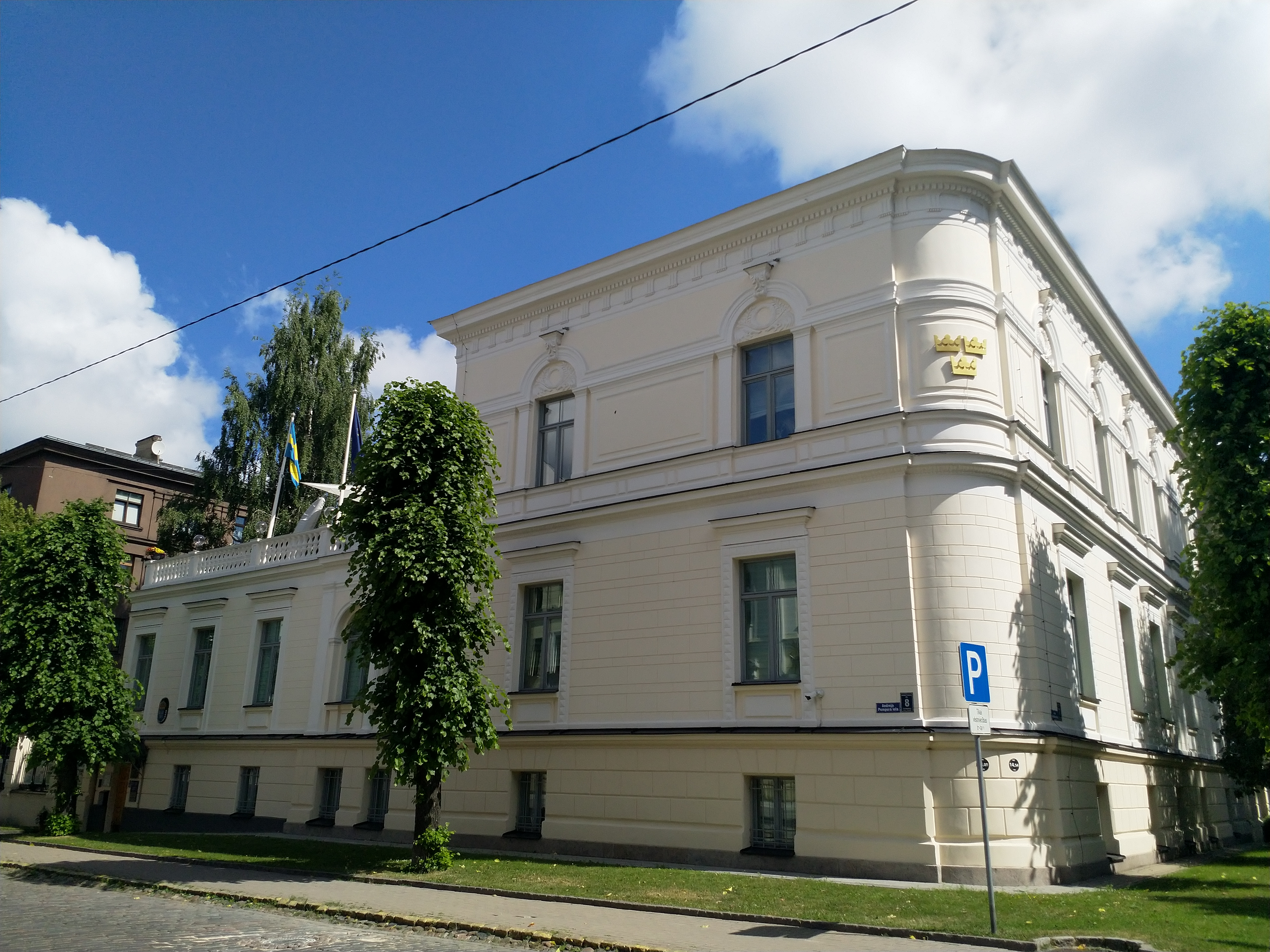
Embassy in Riga

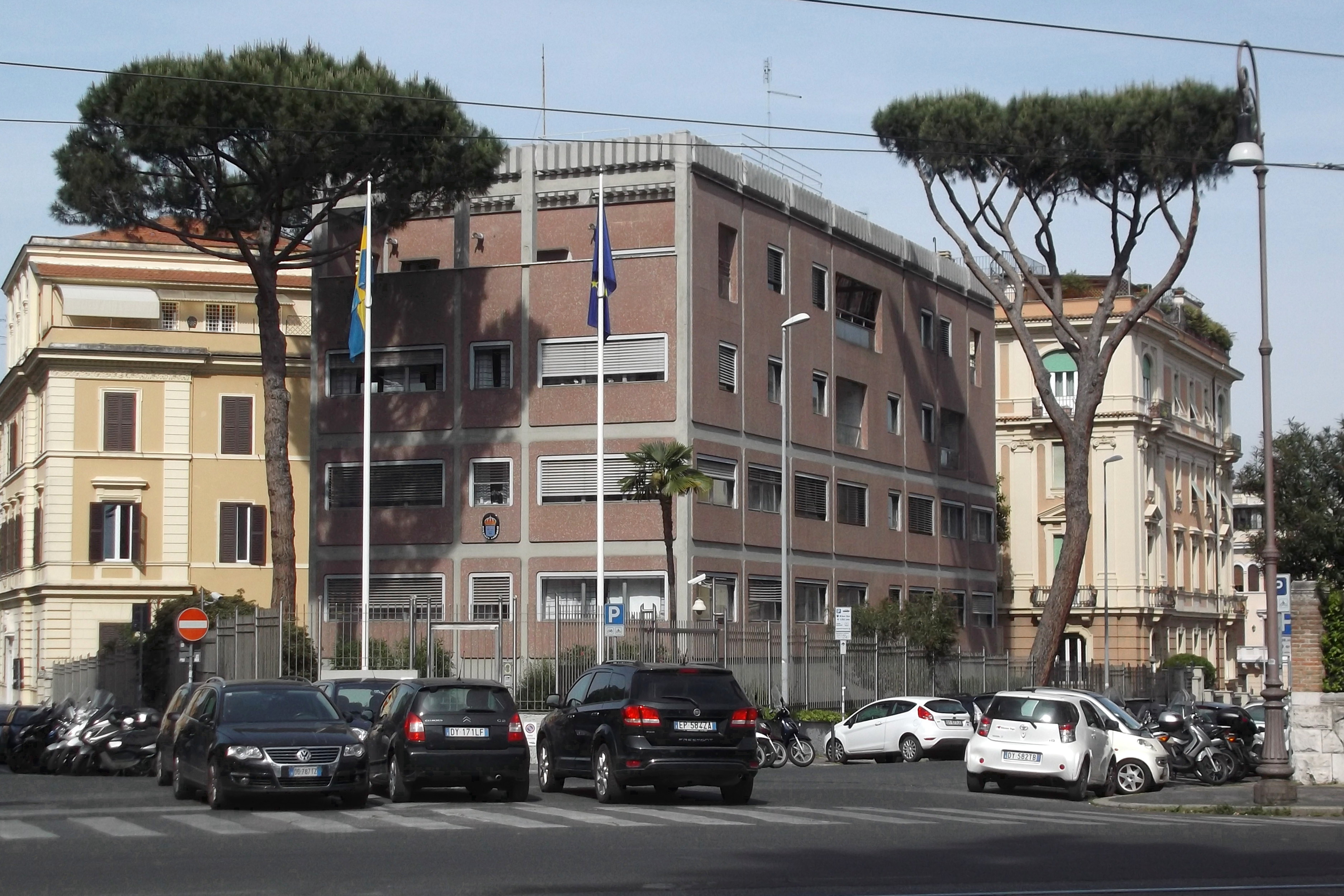
Embassy in Rome

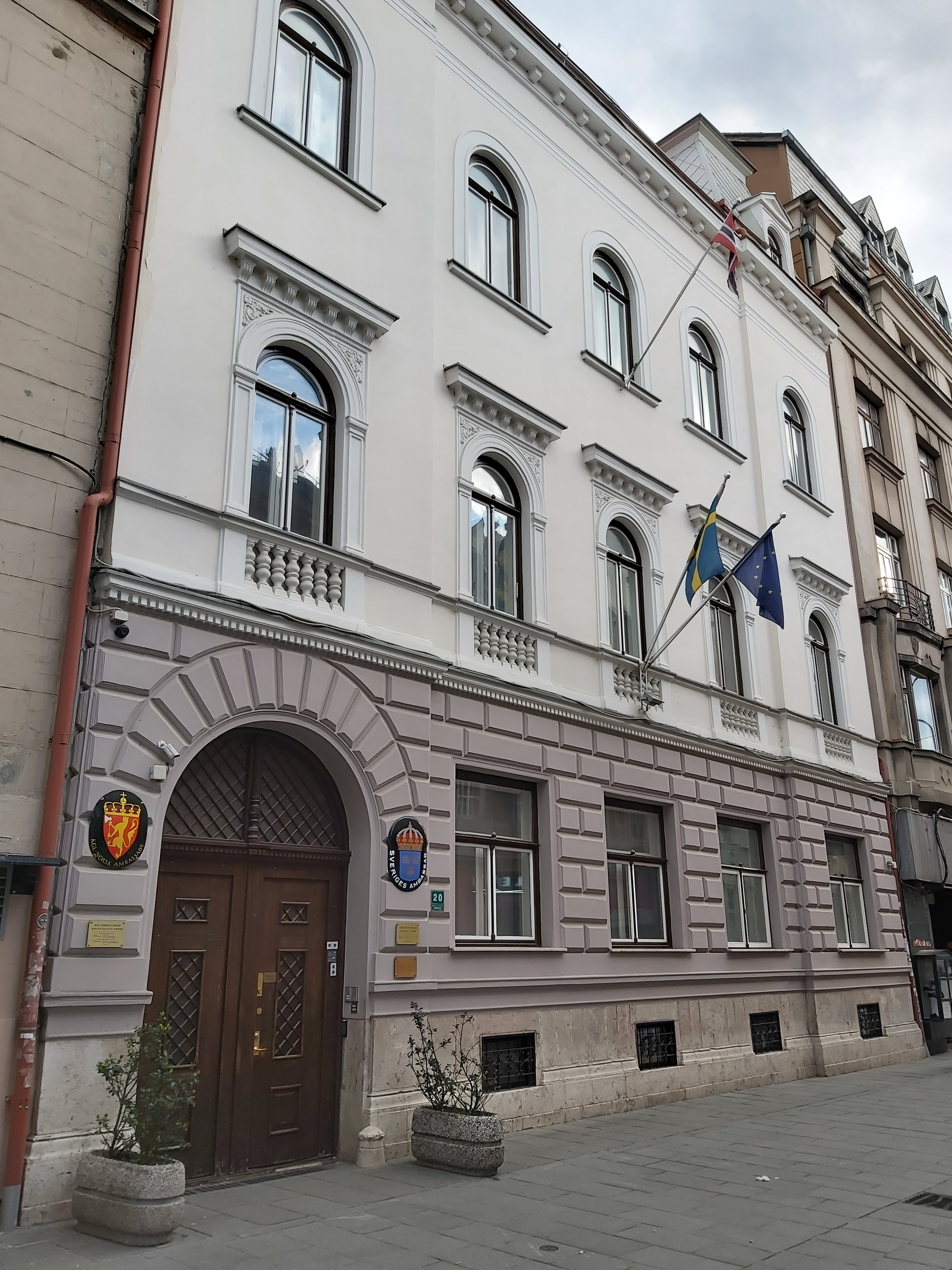
Embassy in Sarajevo

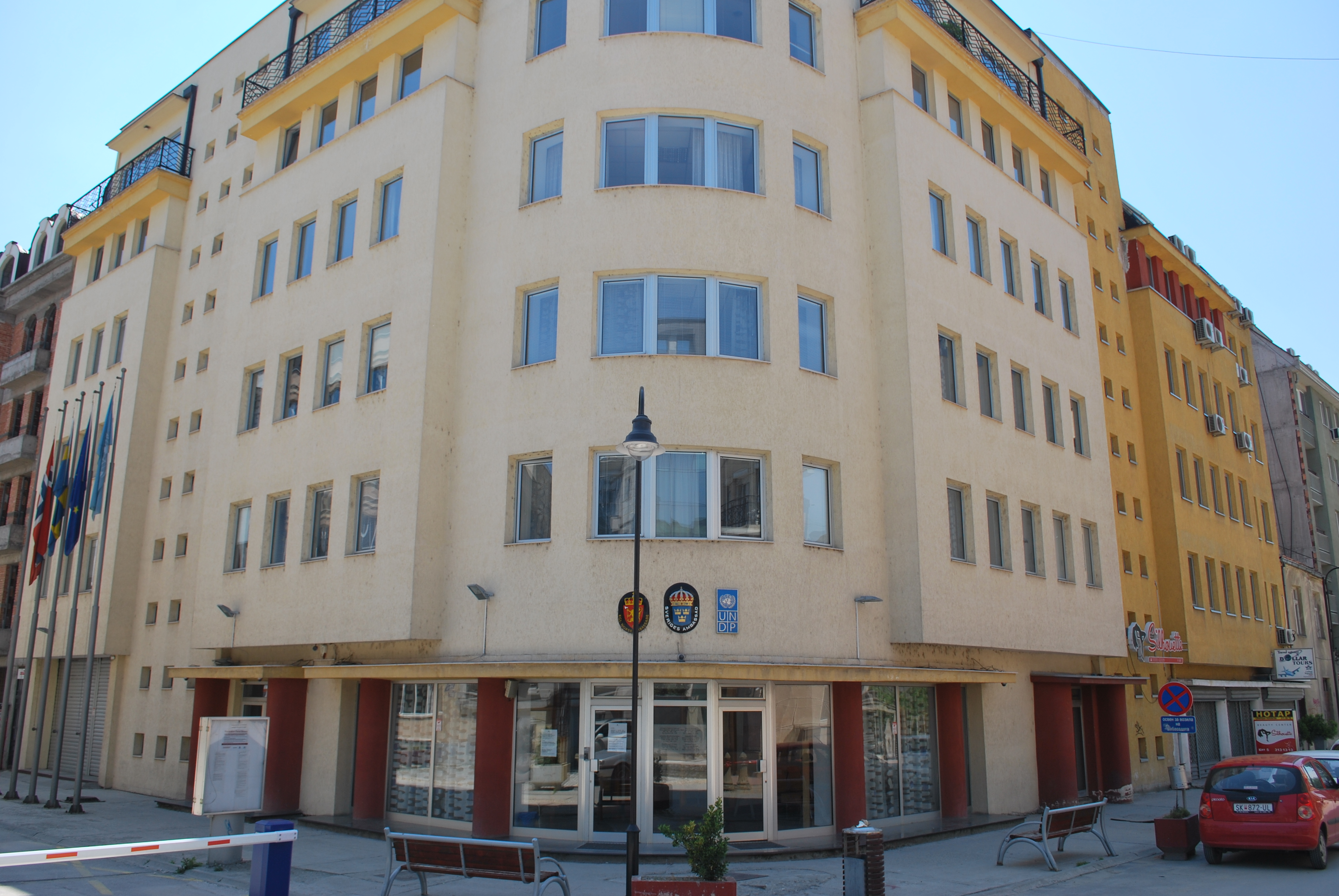
Embassy in Skopje

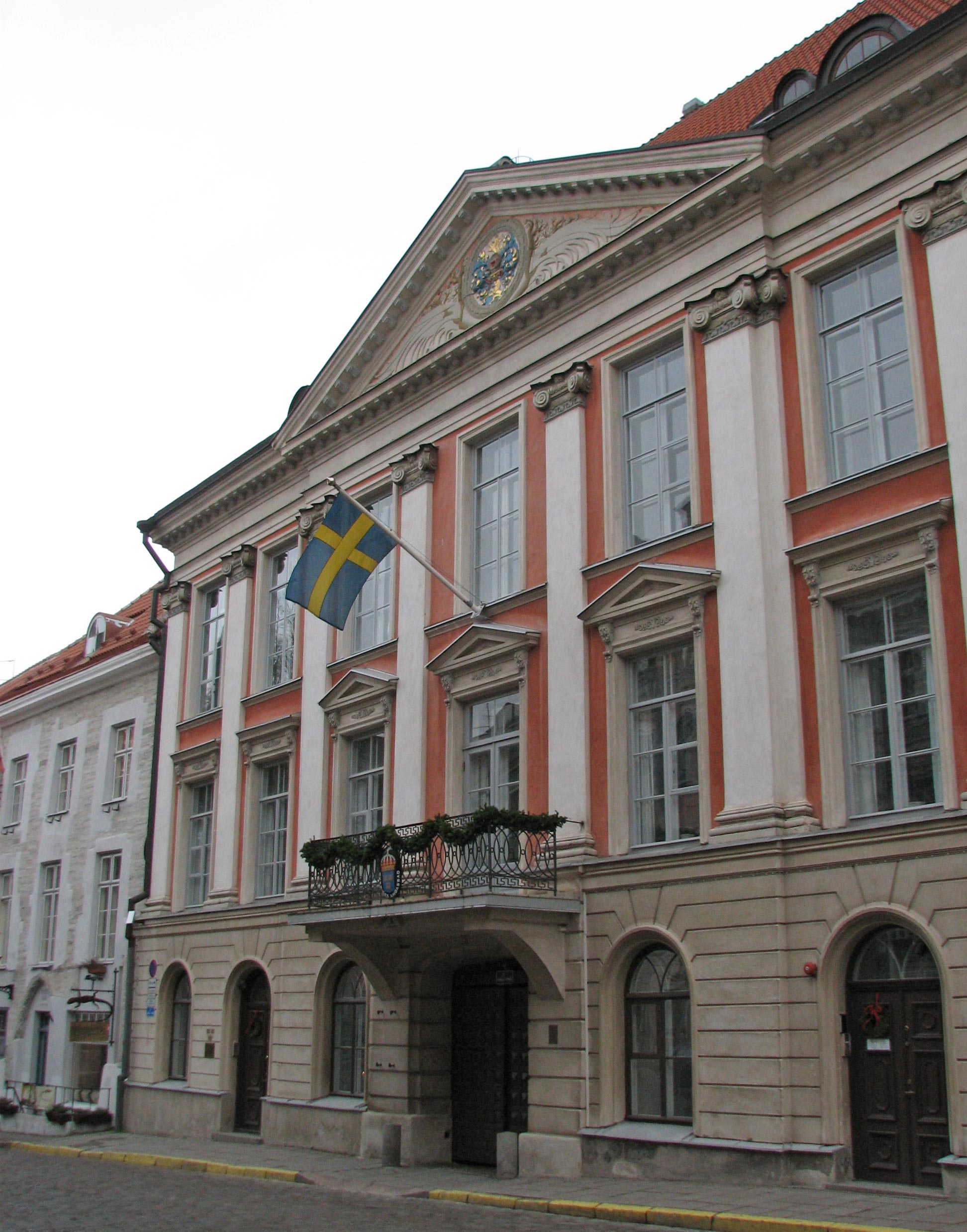
Embassy in Tallinn

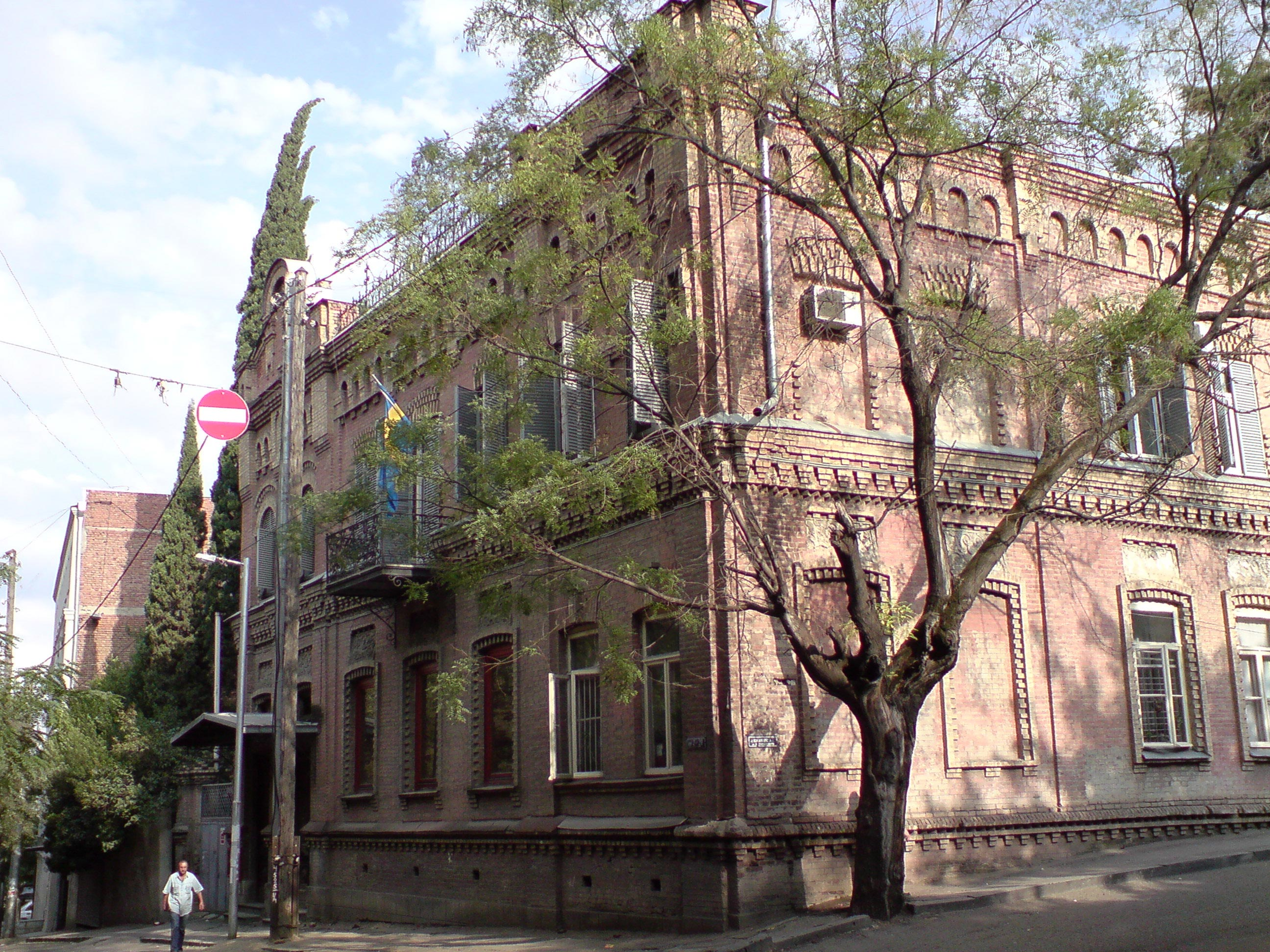
Embassy in Tbilisi

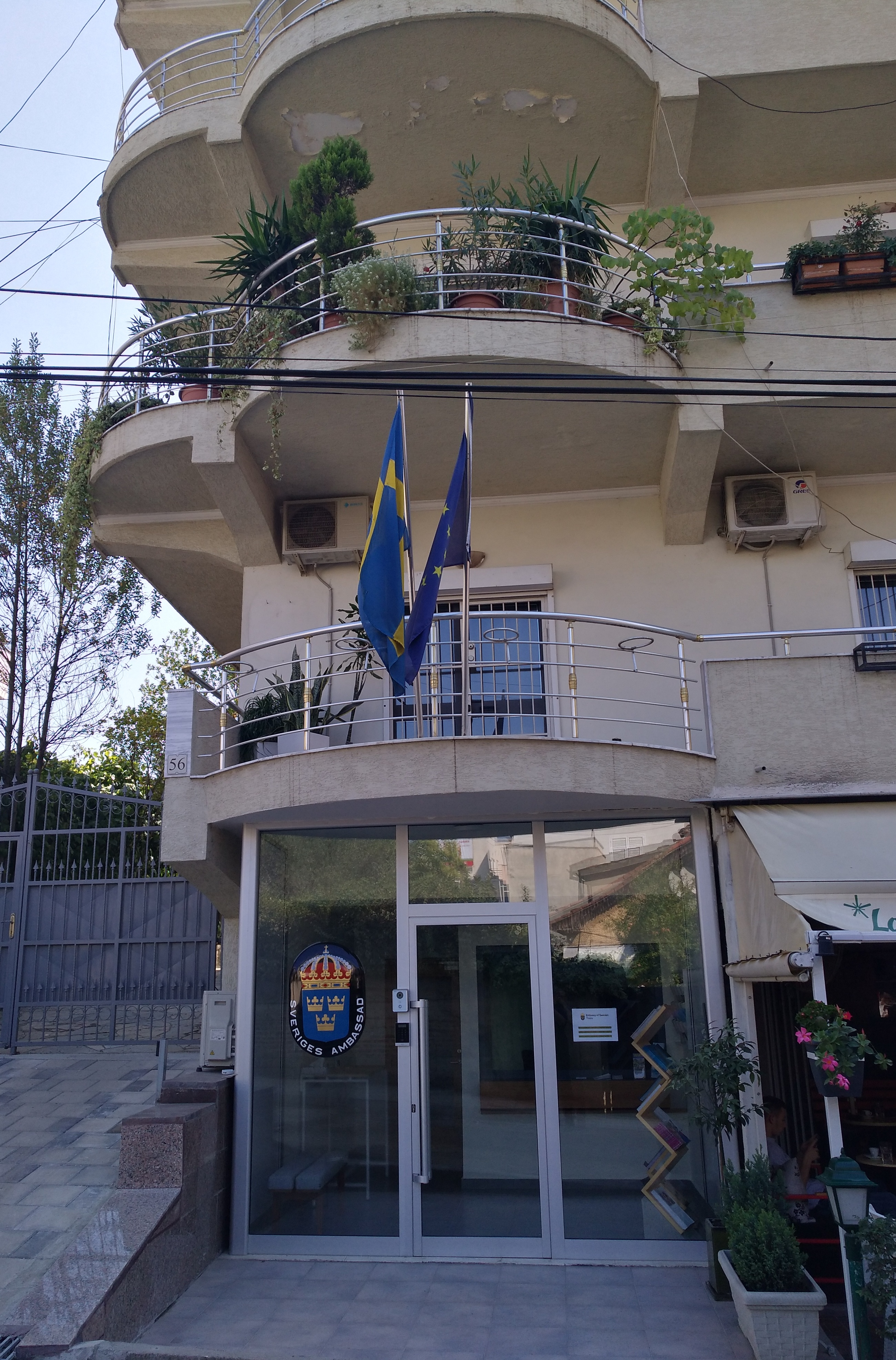
Embassy in Tirana

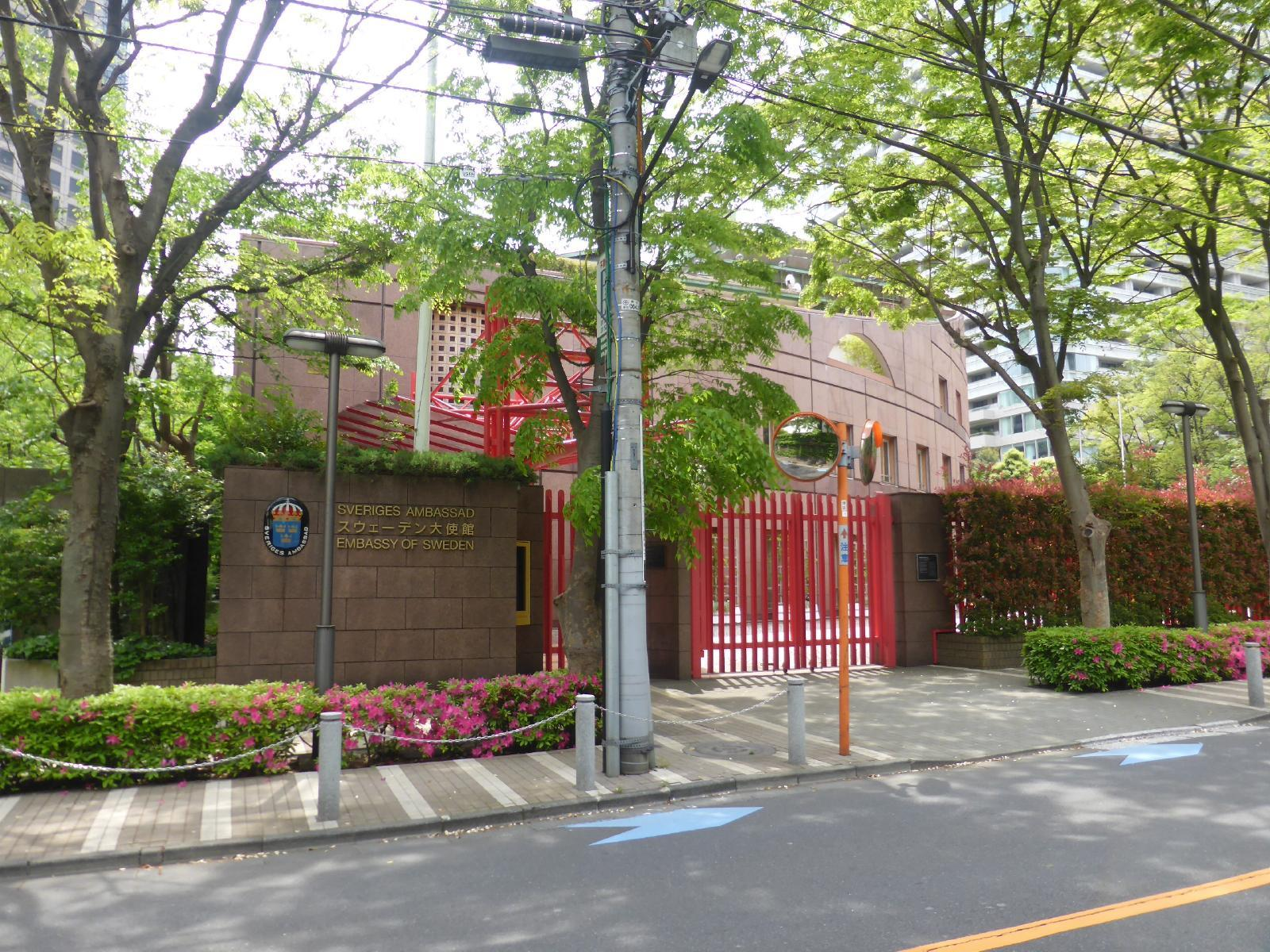
Embassy in Tokyo

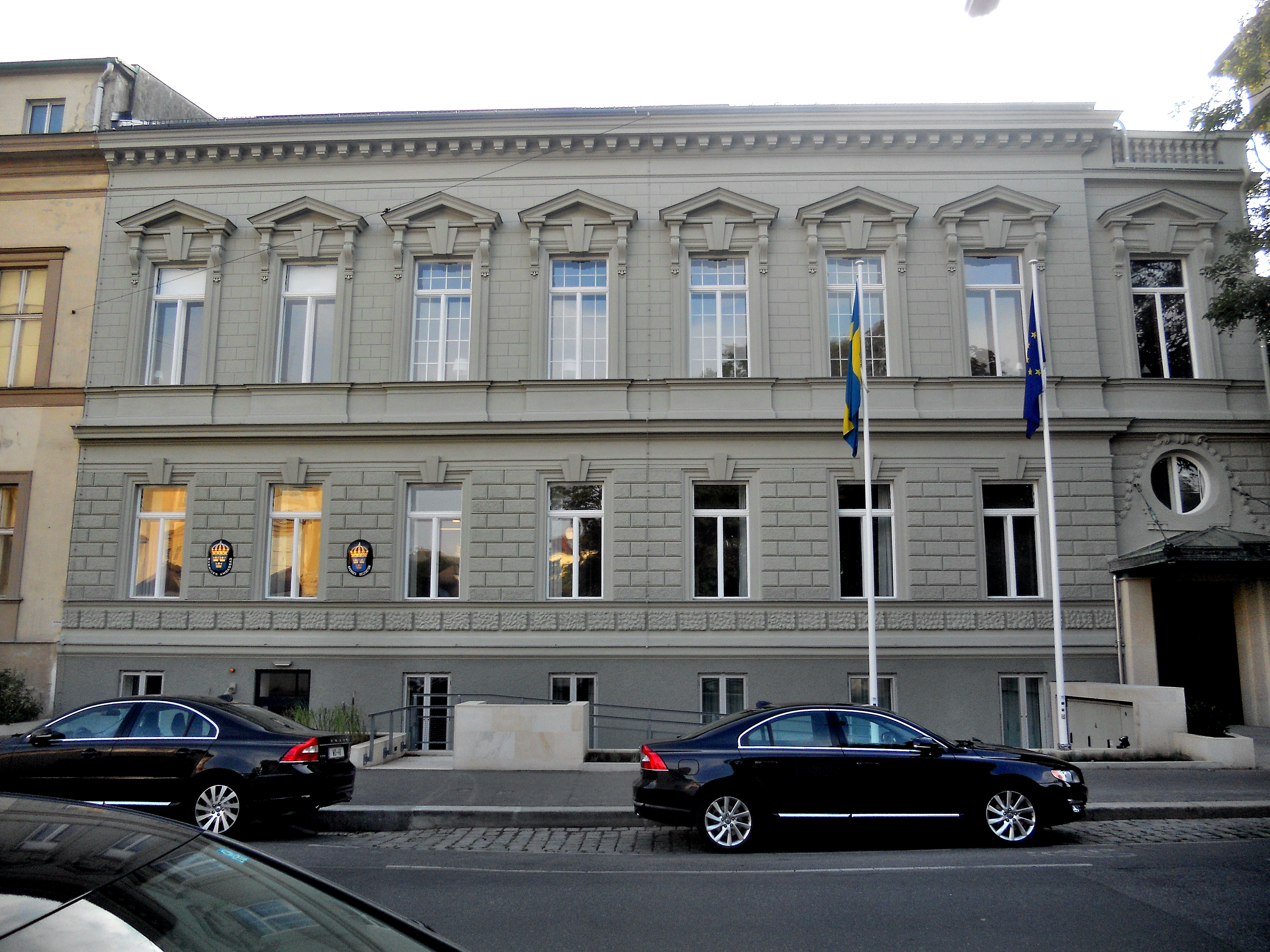
Embassy in Vienna

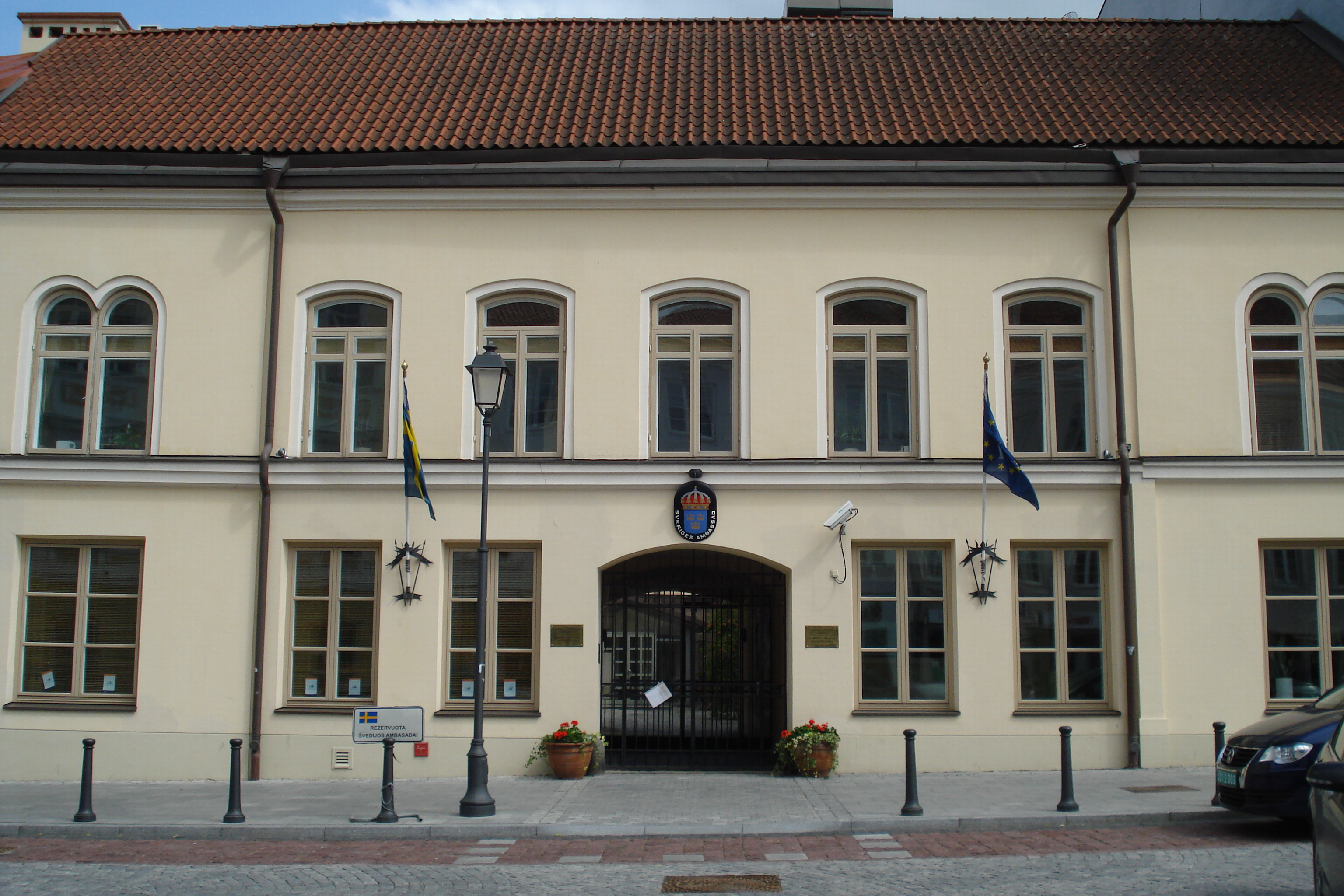
Embassy in Vilnius

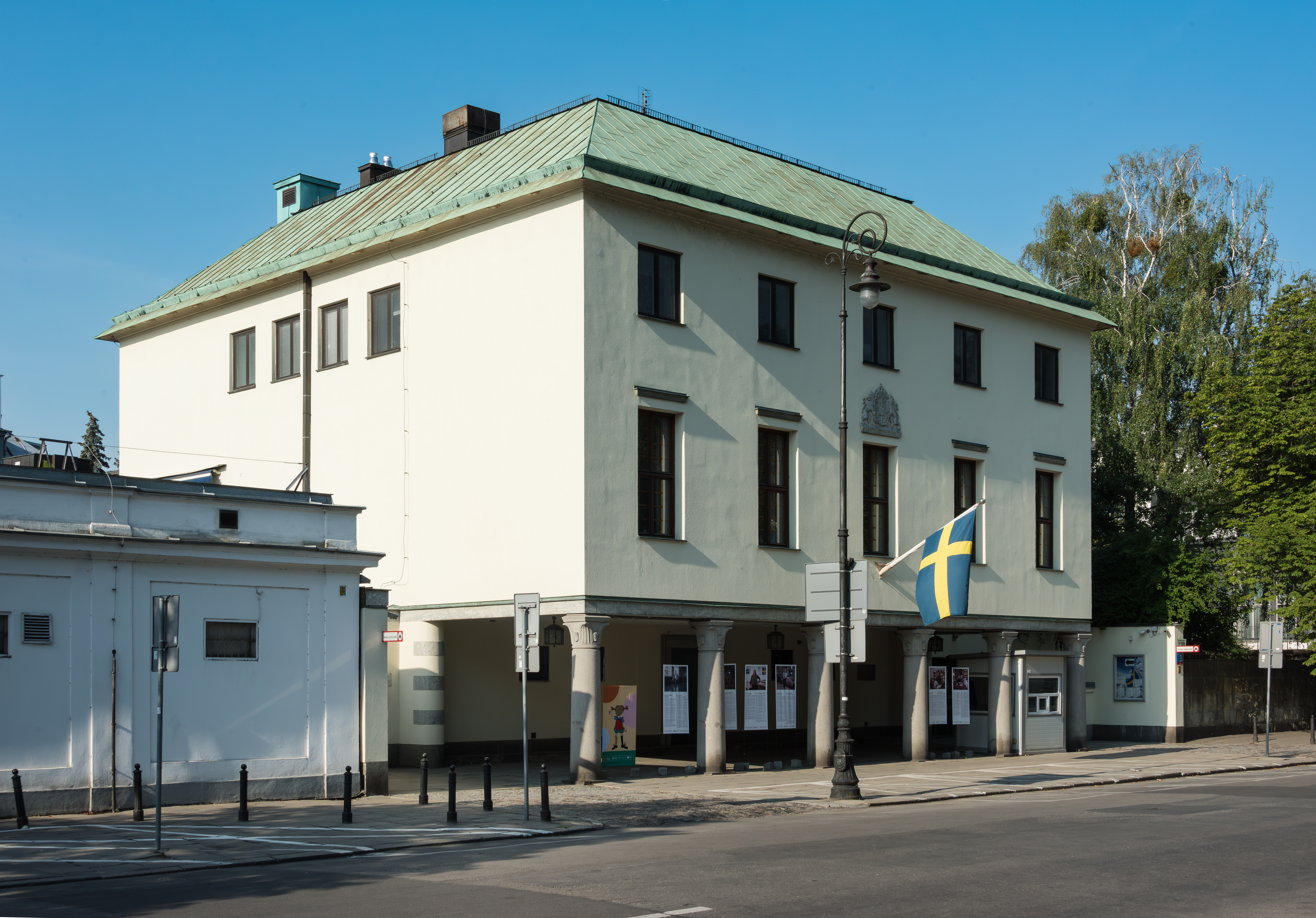
Embassy in Warsaw

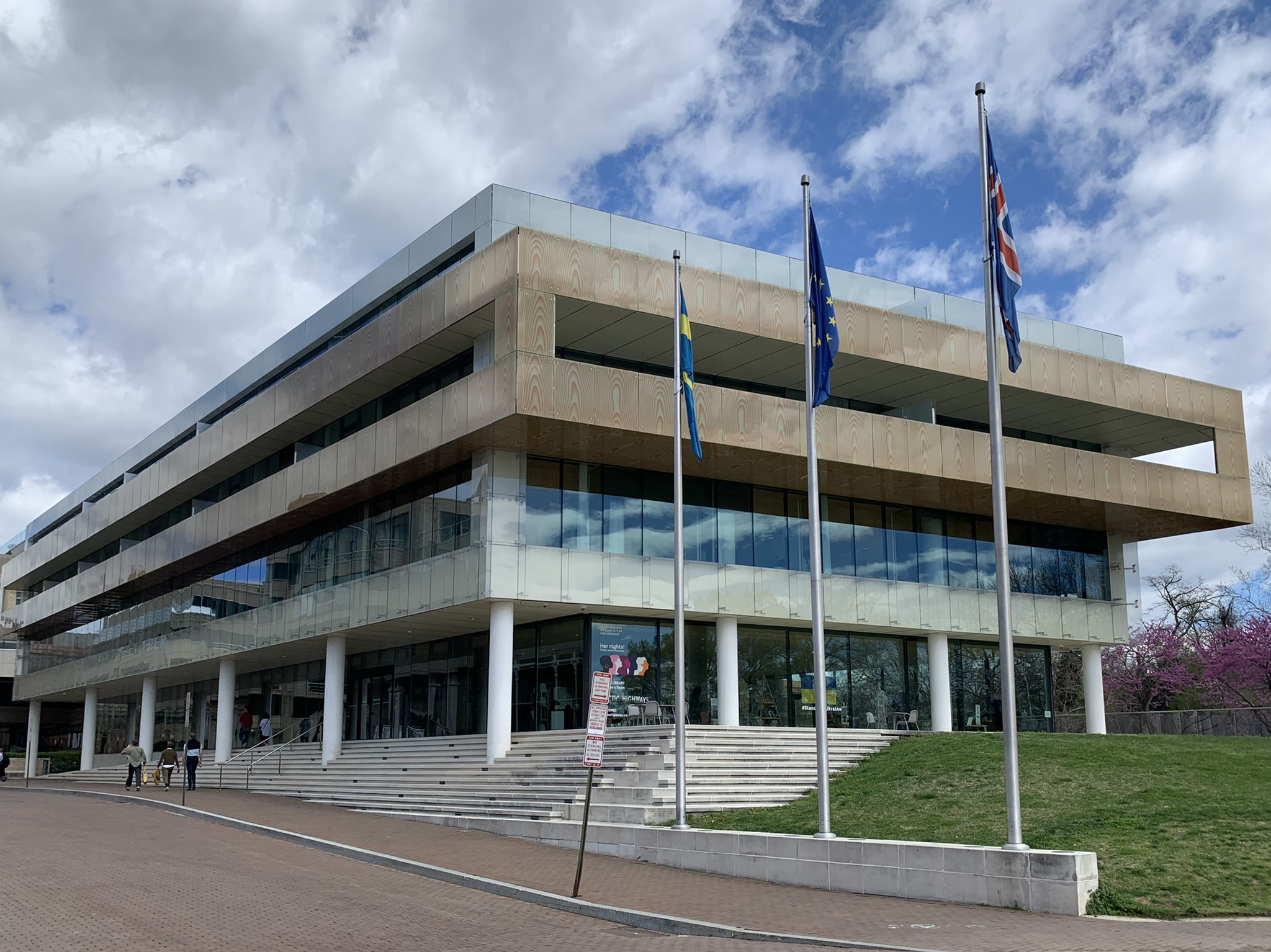
Embassy in Washington, D.C.

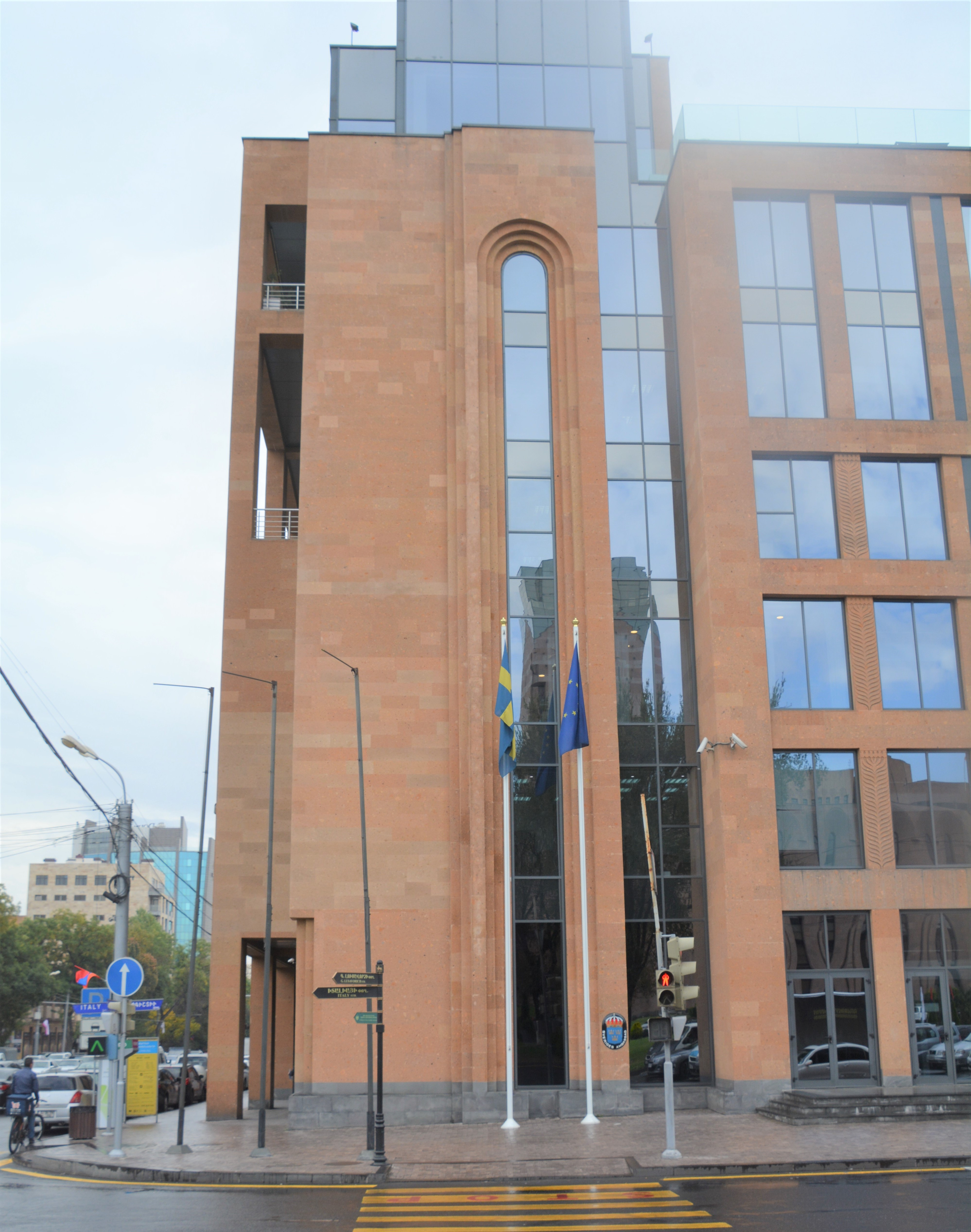
Embassy in Yerevan

=== Residences ===
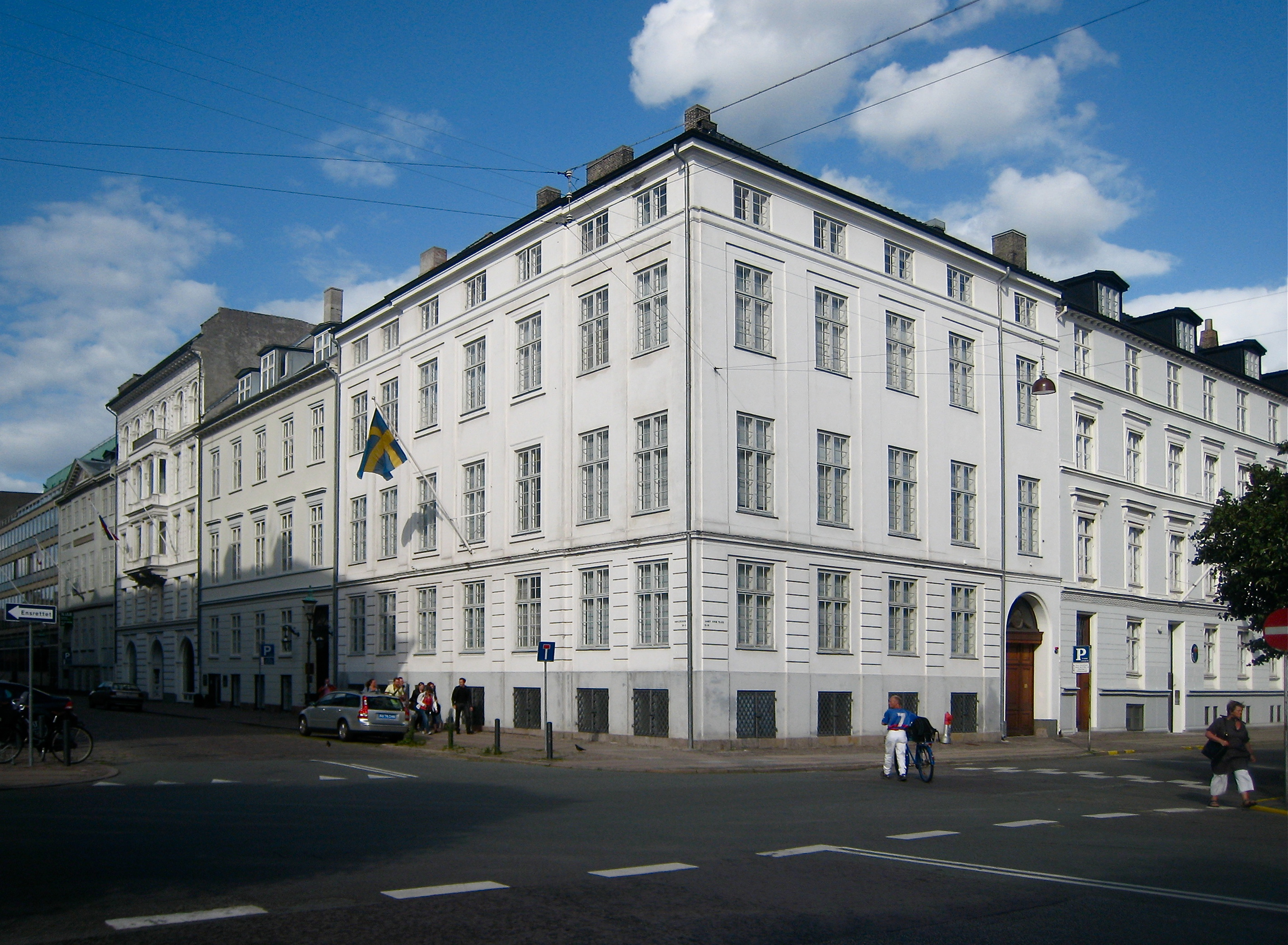
Ambassadorial residence in Copenhagen

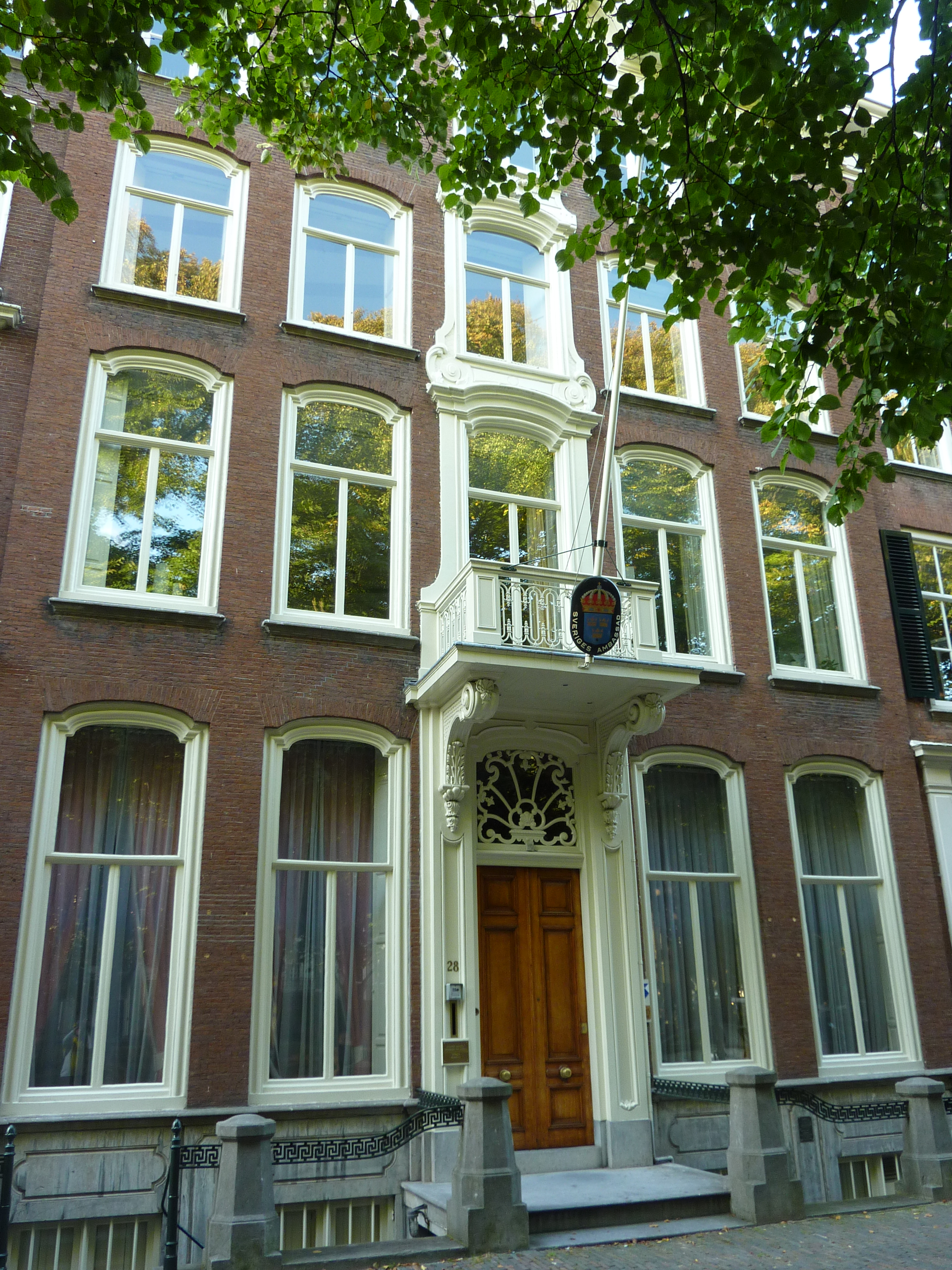
Ambassadorial residence in The Hague

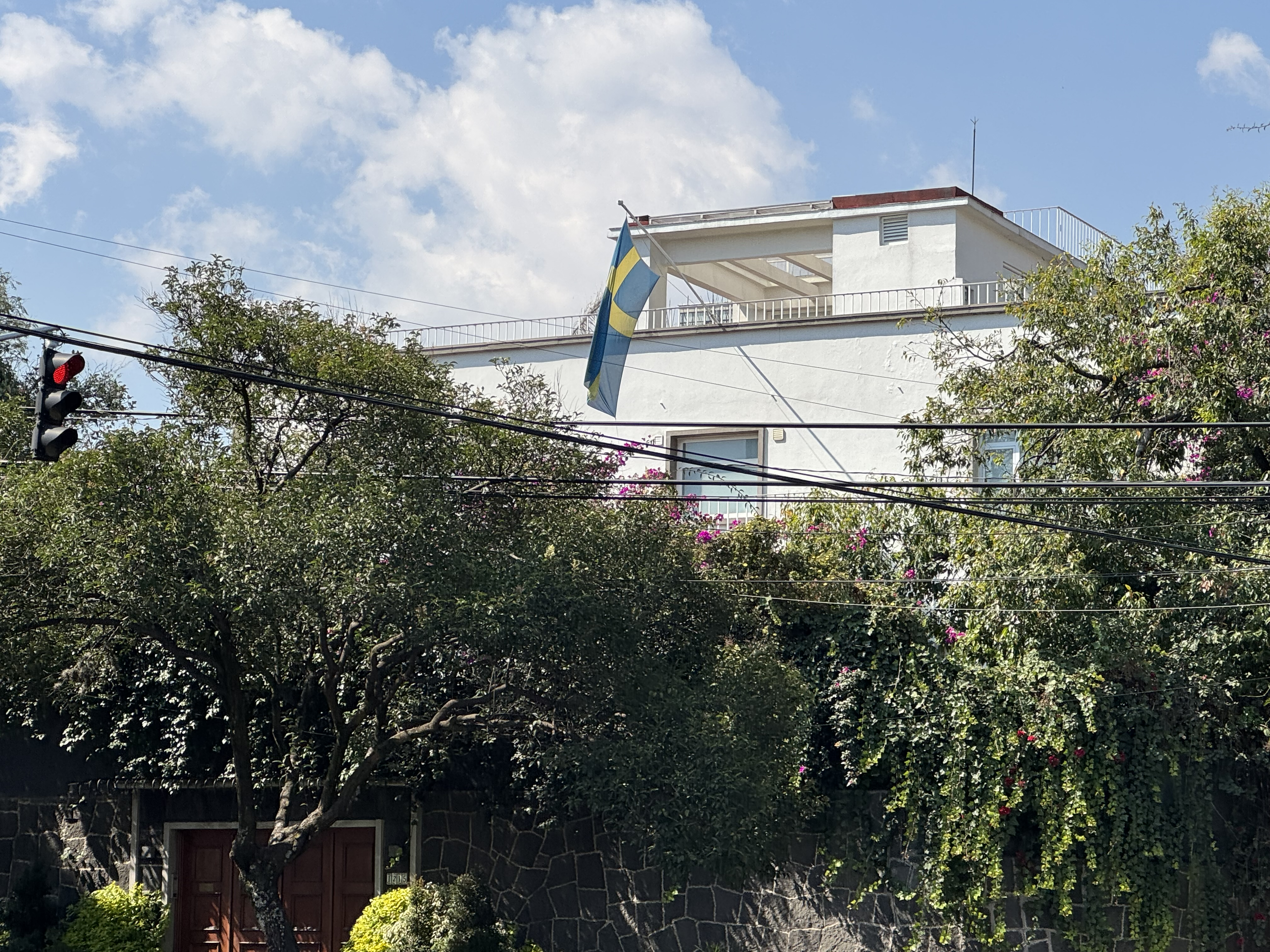
Ambassadorial residence in Mexico City

Former Ambassadorial residence in Washington, D.C.

== Missions to open ==
Host country	Host city	Mission	Ref.
Germany	Munich	Consulate General	

== Closed missions ==
=== Africa ===
Host country	Host city	Mission	Year closed	Ref.
Angola	Luanda	Embassy (Note: Resident in Stockholm, Sweden)	2022	
Botswana	Gaborone	Embassy	2008	
Burkina Faso	Ouagadougou	Embassy	2024	
Guinea-Bissau	Bissau	Embassy	1999	
Ivory Coast	Abidjan	Embassy	2007	
Lesotho	Maseru	Embassy	1993	
Liberia	Monrovia	Embassy	2026	
Libya	Tripoli	Embassy (Note: To be reopened)	1993	
Mali	Bamako	Embassy	2024	
Namibia	Windhoek	Embassy	2007	
Union of South Africa	Cape Town	Consulate-General	1936	
South Sudan	Juba	Embassy section office	2024	
Sudan	Khartoum	Embassy	2023	
Zimbabwe	Harare	Embassy	2026	

=== Americas ===
Host country	Host city	Mission	Year closed	Ref.
Brazil	Rio de Janeiro	Consulate-General	1991	
Brazil	São Paulo	Consulate-General	1983	
Canada	Montreal	Consulate-General	1993	
Canada	Toronto	Consulate-General	1993	
Canada	Vancouver	Consulate	1991	
Ecuador	Quito	Embassy	1992	
Nicaragua	Managua	Embassy	2008	
United States	Chicago	Consulate-General	1993	
United States	Los Angeles	Consulate-General	2009	
United States	Minneapolis	Consulate-General	1989	
Uruguay	Montevideo	Embassy	1993	
Venezuela	Caracas	Embassy	2000	

=== Asia ===
Host country	Host city	Mission	Year closed	Ref.
Cambodia	Phnom Penh	Embassy Section Office (Note: Originally operating as a full embassy, the mission was downgraded to a section office under the Embassy in Bangkok in 2021, to manage the winding down of development aid. The Section Office was permanently closed on 30 September 2024.)	2024	
China	Guangzhou	Consulate-General	2009	
Dutch East Indies	Batavia	Consulate-General	1933	
Iraq	Baghdad	Embassy	2023	
Kuwait	Kuwait City	Embassy	2001	
Laos	Vientiane	Embassy	2008	
Myanmar	Yangon	Embassy section office (Note: Established in 2014 as a section office of the Embassy in Bangkok .)	2026	
Oman	Muscat	Embassy office	1993	
Pakistan	Karachi	Consulate	1973	
Saudi Arabia	Jeddah	Consulate	1995	
Sri Lanka	Colombo	Embassy	2010	
Thailand	Phuket	Consulate-General	2008	

=== Europe ===
Host country	Host city	Mission	Year closed	Ref.
Belgium	Antwerp	Consulate-General	1983	
Bulgaria	Sofia	Embassy	2010	
France	Marseille	Consulate-General	1993	
East Germany	East Berlin	Embassy (Note: Swedish embassy closed due to the reunification of Germany.)	1991	
Estonia	Tallinn	Consulate (Note: Continues as an embassy nowadays.)	1938	
Germany	West Berlin	Consulate-General (Note: Continues as an embassy in Berlin nowadays.)	1994	
Germany	Hamburg	Consulate-General	2009	
Germany	Frankfurt	Consulate-General	1993	
Germany	Munich	Consulate-General (Note: To be reopened in 2027.)	1993	
Holy See	Rome	Embassy (Note: Continues as a chancery. Resident in Stockholm, Sweden.)	2001	
Italy	Milan	Consulate-General	1995	
Italy	Genoa	Consulate-General	1981	
Luxembourg	Luxembourg City	Embassy	2010	
Netherlands	Amsterdam	Consulate-General	1985	
Netherlands	Rotterdam	Consulate (Note: Was a consulate general until 1980 when it was downgraded to a consulate.)	1983	
Norway	Narvik	Consulate	1969	
Poland	Gdańsk	Consulate-General	2008	
Poland	Szczecin	Consulate	1993	
Russia	Kaliningrad	Consulate-General	2009	
Russia	Saint Petersburg	Consulate-General	2023	
Slovakia	Bratislava	Embassy	2010	
Slovenia	Ljubljana	Embassy	2010	
Spain	Barcelona	Consulate-General	1993	
Spain	Málaga	Consulate-General	1993	
Spain	Las Palmas	Consulate	1993	
Spain	Palma de Mallorca	Consulate	1990	
Spain	Santa Cruz de Tenerife	Consulate	1980	
United Kingdom	London	Consulate-General	1973	

=== Oceania ===
Host country	Host city	Mission	Year closed	Ref.
Australia	Sydney	Consulate-General	1995	
New Zealand	Wellington	Embassy	1995	

== See also ==
- Foreign relations of Sweden
- Sweden and the United Nations
- List of diplomatic missions of the Nordic countries
