= Swedish passport =

Passport issued to Swedish citizens

Swedish passport; svenskt pass
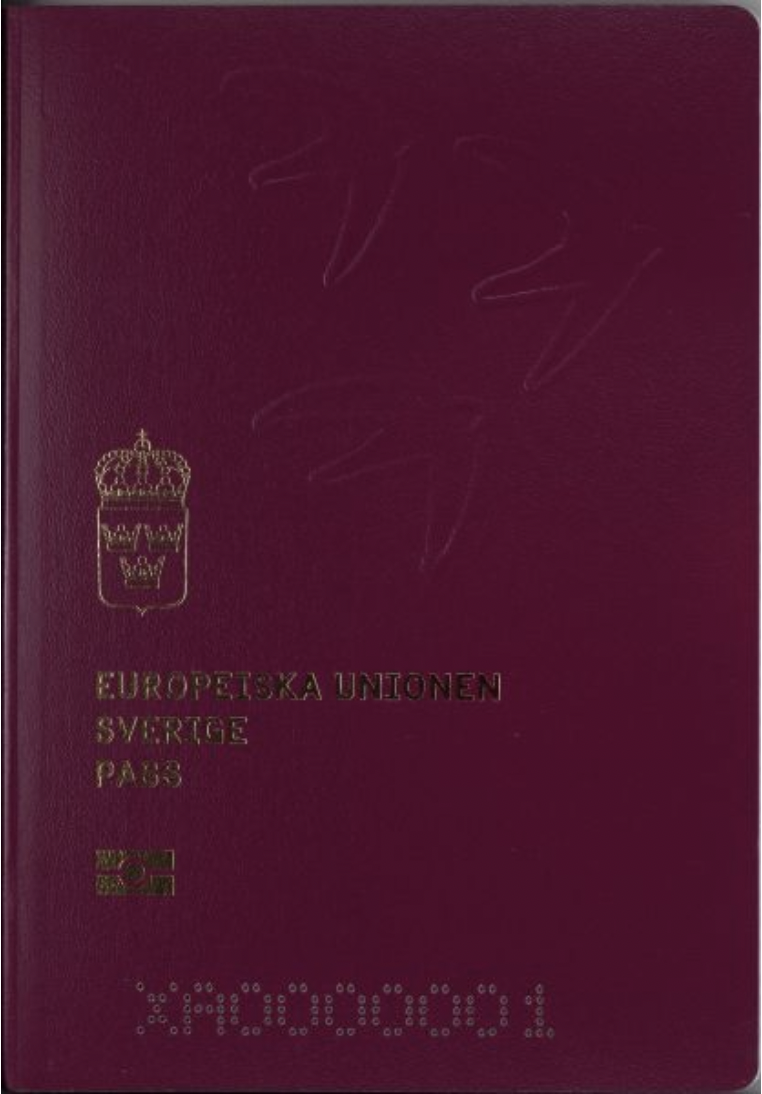
- Front cover of a biometric Swedish passport issued since 2022

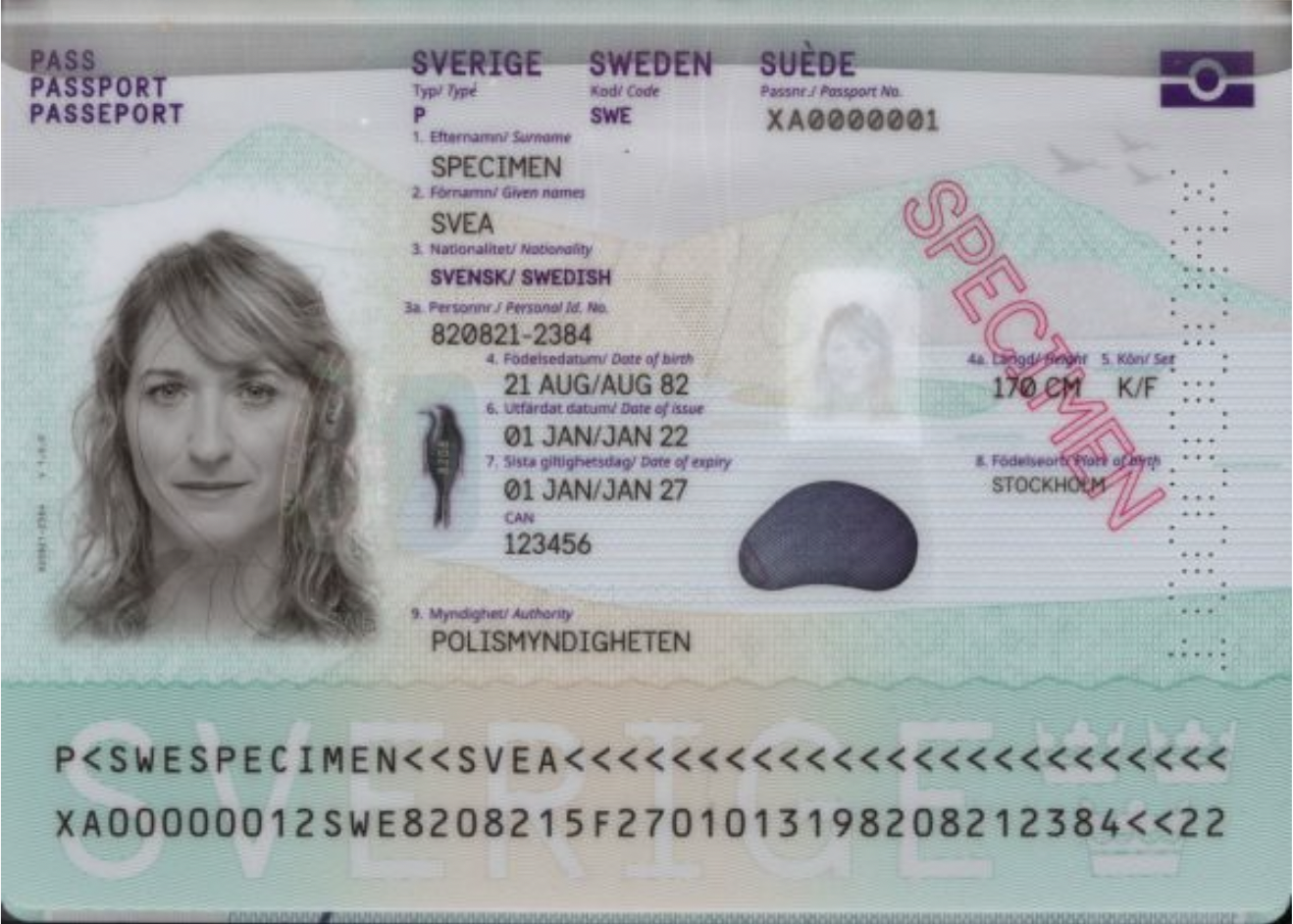
- The data page of a Swedish biometric passport
- Type: Passport
- Issued by: Swedish Police Authority
- First issued: 1812 (first passport regulations, as amendment to the Basic Laws of Sweden); 1998 (first machine-readable EU design); 1 October 2005 (first biometric version); 2 January 2012 (second biometric version); 1 January 2022 (current biometric version)
- Purpose: Identification
- Eligibility: Swedish citizenship
- Expiration: 5 years after issuance for individuals aged 12 and above; 3 years for citizens 11 and under
- Cost: 500 SEK (1,600 at embassies)

Swedish passports (Swedish: svenskt pass) is a travel document issued to nationals of Sweden for the purpose of international travel. Every Swedish citizen is also a citizen of the European Union and the passport, along with the national identity card allows for freedom of movement in any of the states of the European Economic Area and Switzerland. Swedish citizens are also permitted for travel within the Nordic countries, the Nordic Passport Union allows Nordic citizens to move freely without requiring identity documentation.

Besides serving as proof of Swedish citizenship, the Swedish passport facilitate the process of securing assistance from Swedish consular officials abroad (or other EU or Nordic missions Swedish passports are issued by the Swedish Police Authority and applications are made at police stations equipped with a passport terminal for taking photographs and fingerprints. Passports issued since 1 October 2005 are biometric, and valid for five years. Earlier passports were valid for ten years (adults) or five years (children).

It is possible for a Swedish citizen to hold two valid passports at the same time if it is needed for work or other special reasons for as long as the necessity applies, but not longer than the ordinary passport is valid for. One example being that some countries in the Arab League do not allow entry to passport holders of any nationality with Israeli visas or passport stamps, requiring two passports in that situation.

== Physical appearance and data contained ==
The Swedish passports issued since 1 October 2005 are burgundy, with the words "EUROPEISKA UNIONEN" (EUROPEAN UNION), "SVERIGE" (SWEDEN) and "PASS" (PASSPORT) inscribed at the top of the front cover, and the Swedish lesser coat of arms emblazoned on the bottom of the front cover. The Swedish passport has the standard biometric symbol emblazoned below the coat of arms and uses the standard European Union design. Diplomatic passports are dark blue, with the words "DIPLOMATPASS" (DIPLOMATIC PASSPORT) and "SVERIGE" (SWEDEN)

=== Identity information page ===
The Swedish Passport includes the following printed data:

- Photograph of passport holder
- Type (P)
- Code (SWE)
- Passport number
- 1 Surname
- 2 Given names
- 3 Nationality (SVENSK SWEDISH)
- 3a. Personal identity number
- 4 Date of birth
- 4a. Height
- 5 Sex
- 6 Date of issue
- 7 Date of expiry
- 8 Place of birth
- 9 Authority
- 10 Holder's signature

The information page ends with the Machine Readable Zone starting with P < SWE. In addition to this, the passport also has printed safeguards to make it easier to visually detect forgery attempts.

=== Different spellings of the same name ===
The name in the non-machine-readable zone is spelled as in the national population register, i.e. transliterated to Latin script if required. In the machine-readable zone, letters outside the A–Z range like å, ä or ö are mapped to digraphs, å becoming AA, ä becoming AE, and ö becoming OE. For example: Fältskog → FAELTSKOG. Letters with accents are replaced by simple letters (for example, é becomes E).

=== Chip data ===
The current series of passports contain an RFID chip with 16 data groups (DGs).

- DG1 – MRZ, mandatory
- DG2 – Face, mandatory
- DG3 – Finger, optional (Mandatory for EU Schengen and EU MS)
- DG4 – Iris, optional
- —
- DG14 – SecurityInfo, optional
- DG15 – Active authentication public key, optional
- SO – Security object, mandatory

The security object contains signed hash values of all data groups. Correctly verifying this SOD with its PKI certificate hierarchy will tell that the passport is authentic and issued by the correct and valid issuer. Even the public available data (DG1, DG2, DG14, DG15, SO) in the chip requires decryption with a key printed in the machine-readable zone, which aims to prevent the chip from being read without the user's consent. Sweden started capturing and storing fingerprint data for new passport applications on 28 June 2009, as required by the European Union.

=== Languages ===
The data page/information page is printed in Swedish and English, with translation in other official languages of the European Union elsewhere in the document. The page containing the guide to check the security features of the data page is printed only in English.

== Identification requirements ==
Application is done at passport offices (located in police stations) or embassies. The applicant must show up in person, and will have the photo taken there. When doing the application identification of the applicant is needed. This is done by:

- Showing a valid Swedish passport (not temporary), Swedish national identity card, Swedish driving licence, Swedish tax office id card, or an id card following the SIS standard.

A person not possessing any of these identity documents must bring a person who vouches for the identity, is at least 18 years old, has one of the above documents, and is one of:

- Husband, wife, someone living at the same address, parent, grandparent, own child, sibling, adopted parent or equivalent, employer since at least one year, or an official at an authority who knows the person through their work.

These requirements are similar to the procedure for other Swedish identity documents. There is no age limit to get a passport, but people below 18 must be accompanied by their guardian (preferably both) at application.

== Visa-free travel ==
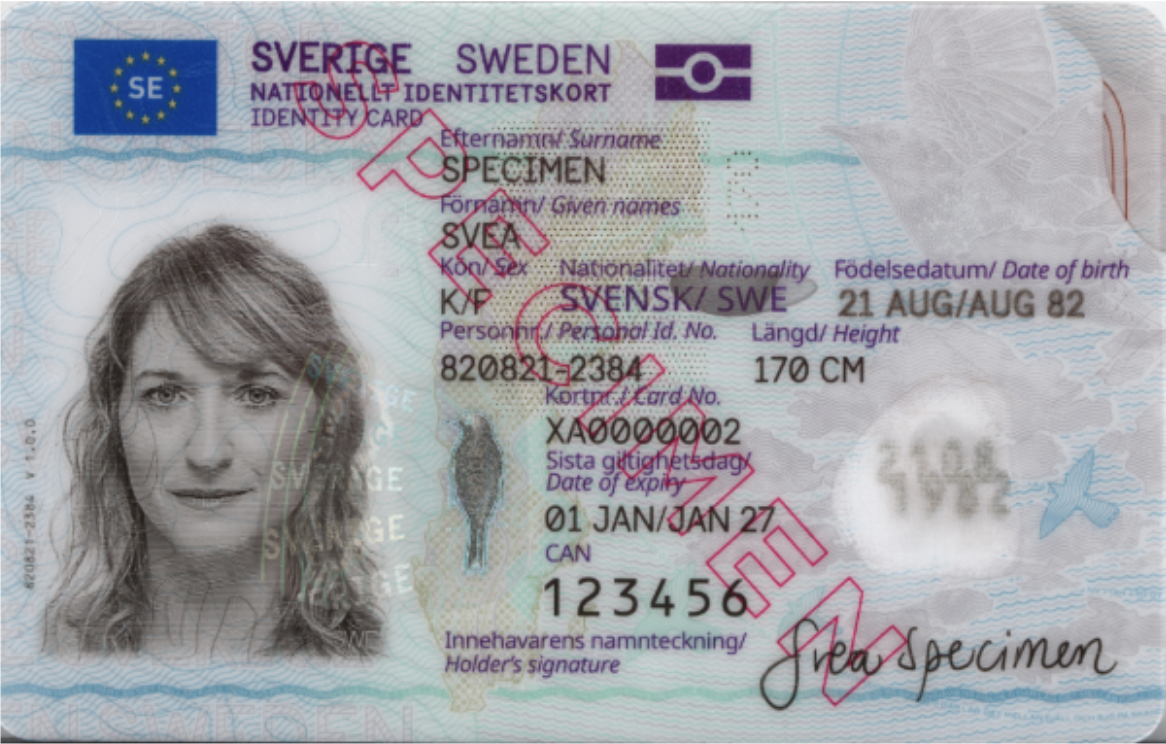
Front of the Swedish national ID card since 2022

Visa requirements for Swedish citizens Sweden Full freedom of movement (Nordic Passport Union) Freedom of movement Visa not required / ESTA / eTA / eVisitor Visa on arrival eVisa Visa available both on arrival or online Visa required prior to arrival

Visa requirements for Swedish citizens are administrative entry restrictions by the authorities of other states placed on citizens of Sweden. As of 2025, Swedish citizens have visa-free, eTA or visa on arrival access to 188 countries and territories, ranking the Swedish passport 4th in the world, according to the methodology of the Henley Passport Index.

The Swedish national identity card (Swedish: nationellt identitetskort) can be used for traveling to most European countries (except Belarus, Russia, Ukraine and United Kingdom). It can also be used instead of a Swedish passport for entering Dominica (de facto), French overseas territories, Georgia, Montserrat (if in transit to a third country for max 14 days) and on package holidays to Tunisia. However, direct outbound travel from Sweden to non-EU/Schengen territories is not permitted by Swedish border police.

As a member state of the European Union, Swedish citizens enjoy freedom of movement within the European Economic Area (EEA). The Citizens’ Rights Directive defines the right of free movement for citizens of the EEA. Through bilateral agreements freedom of movement is extended to Switzerland, and all EU and EFTA nationals are not only visa-exempt but are legally entitled to enter and reside in each other's countries.

== Misuse ==
In 2013, Swedish passports were reported to be among the most frequently traded passports on the black market. The reason cited was that there was no limit on the number of replacement passports a holder could request. This prompted calls for legislation to limit the number of times replacement passports could be issued per individual.

Before 2016, Sweden had no limit on the number of times an individual may claim to have lost a passport and have a new one re-issued. That led to Swedish passports being sold on the black market and used by people smugglers. This prompted calls for legislation to limit the number of times replacement passports could be issued to each citizen. On 15 April 2016 a new law was enacted limiting holders to a maximum of three passports issued within a five-year period.

Number of Swedish passports issued per person 2009–2013
Number of passport issued to individual	Number of such individuals
3	20,162
4	4,884
5	998
6	291
7	96
8	33
9	14
10	2
11	3
12	3
18	1

=== Forgeries ===
In 2020 Swedish police reported 450 forged passports, nearly twice the number from the previous year, included in that number were also instances where a genuine passport was used by another individual of similar appearance. These were part of a black market where passports are bought, rented or borrowed for journeys to and from Sweden. Recorded instances included asylum seekers, people using the forged passports for criminal or any combination of the two.

== Historic images ==
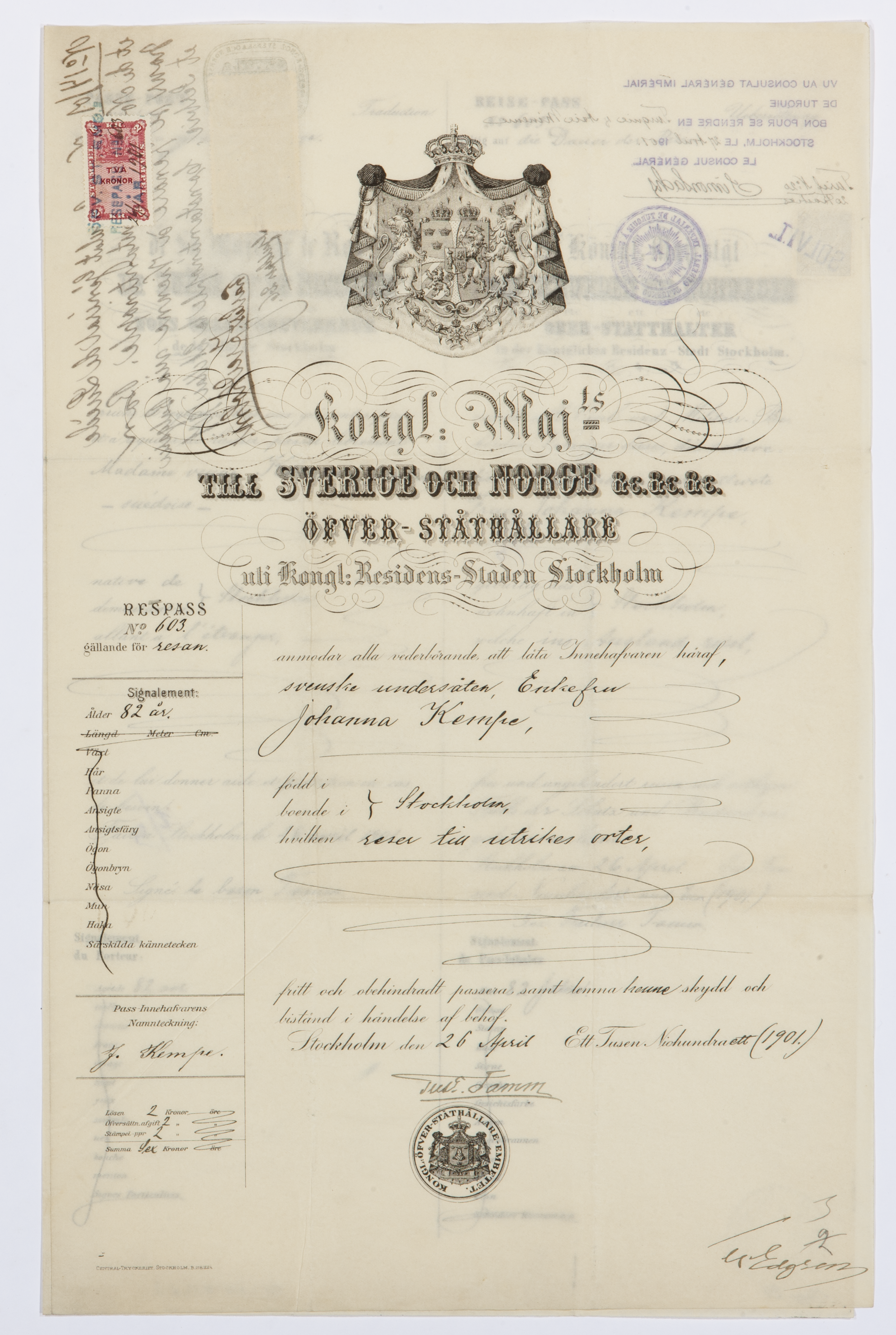
Sweden–Norway passport issued to Johanna Kempe (sv) in 1901.

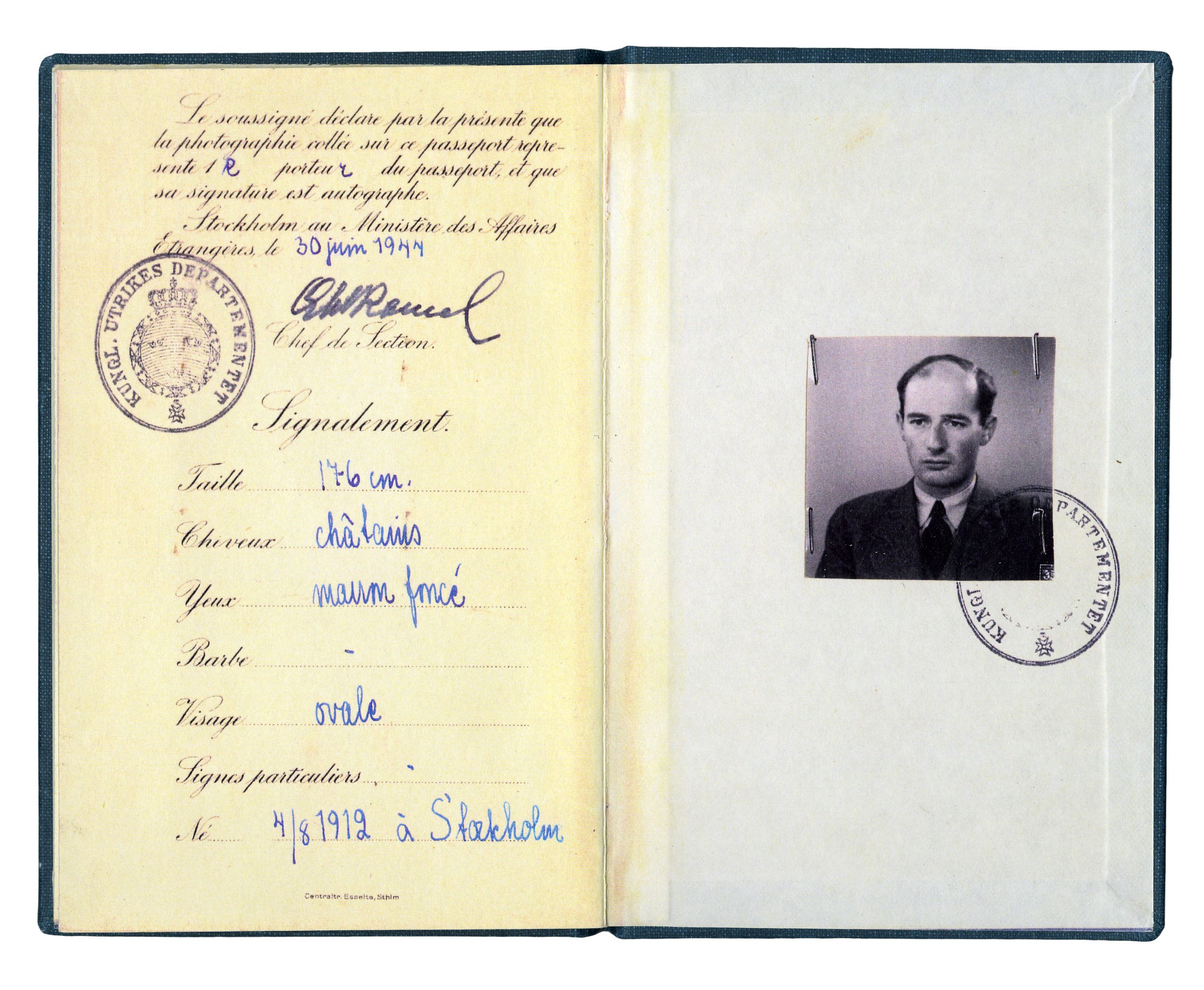
Swedish diplomatic passport from 1944, issued to Raoul Wallenberg.

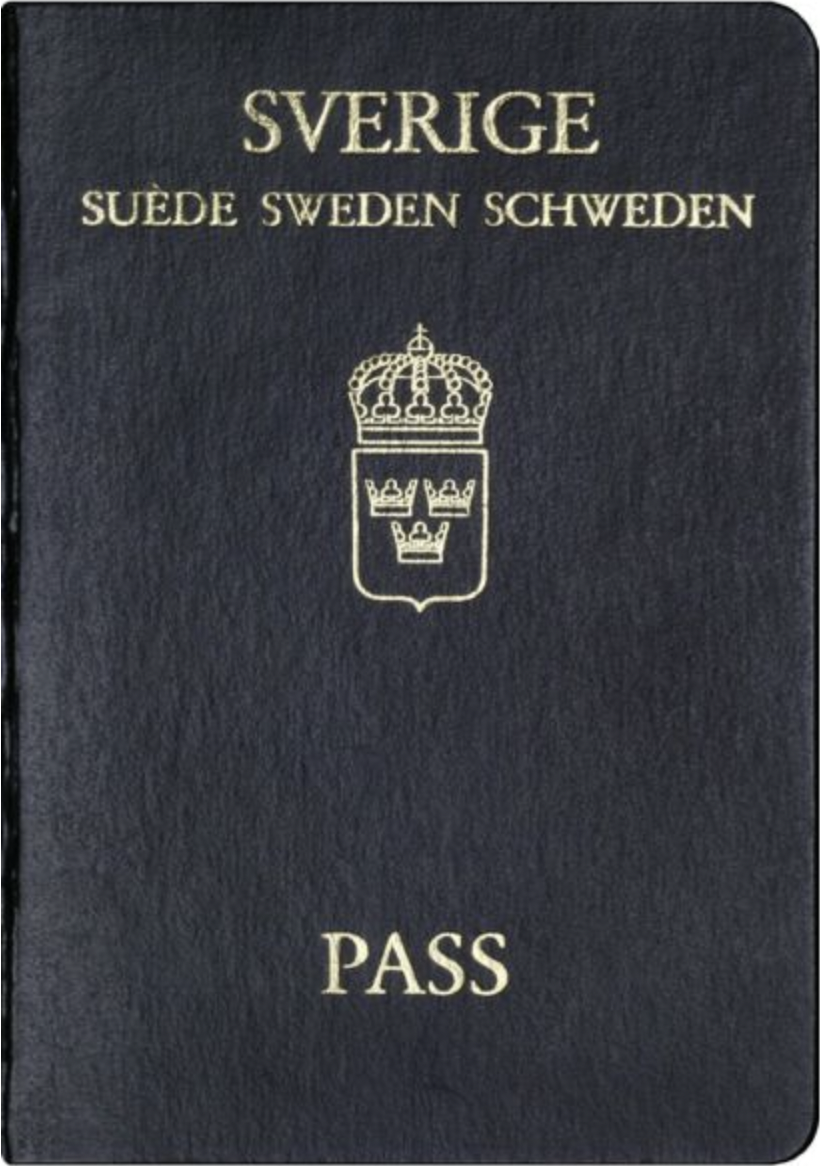
"Black cover" Swedish ordinary passport, issued in 1989.

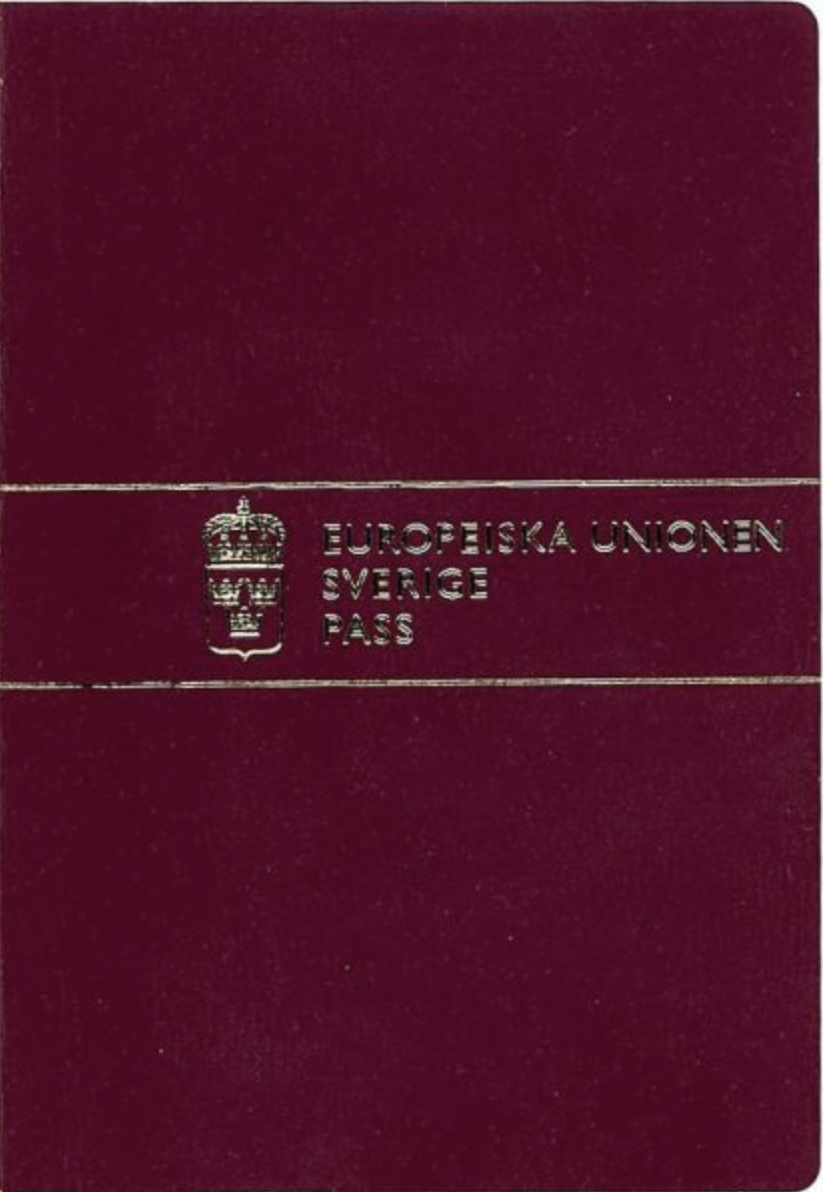
Machine-readable Swedish passport issued in 1998 (First EU design).

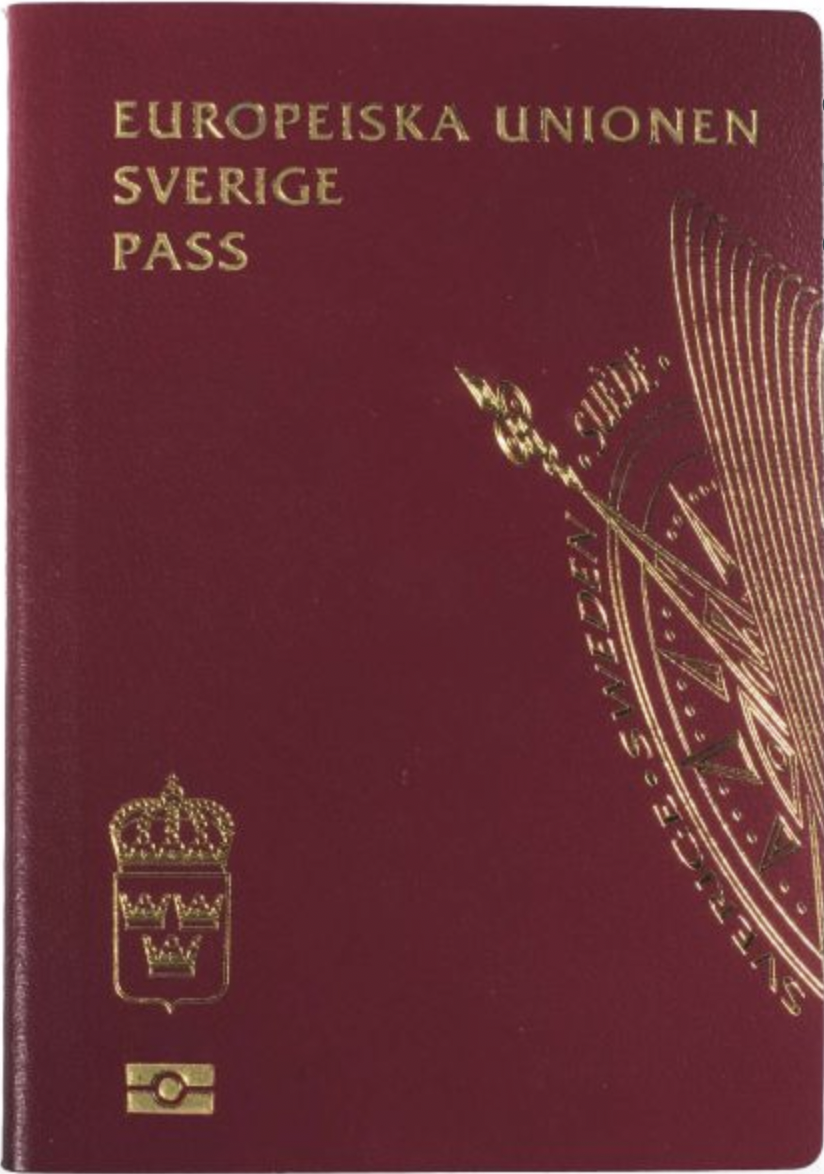
1st generation biometric Swedish passport issued between 2005–2012.

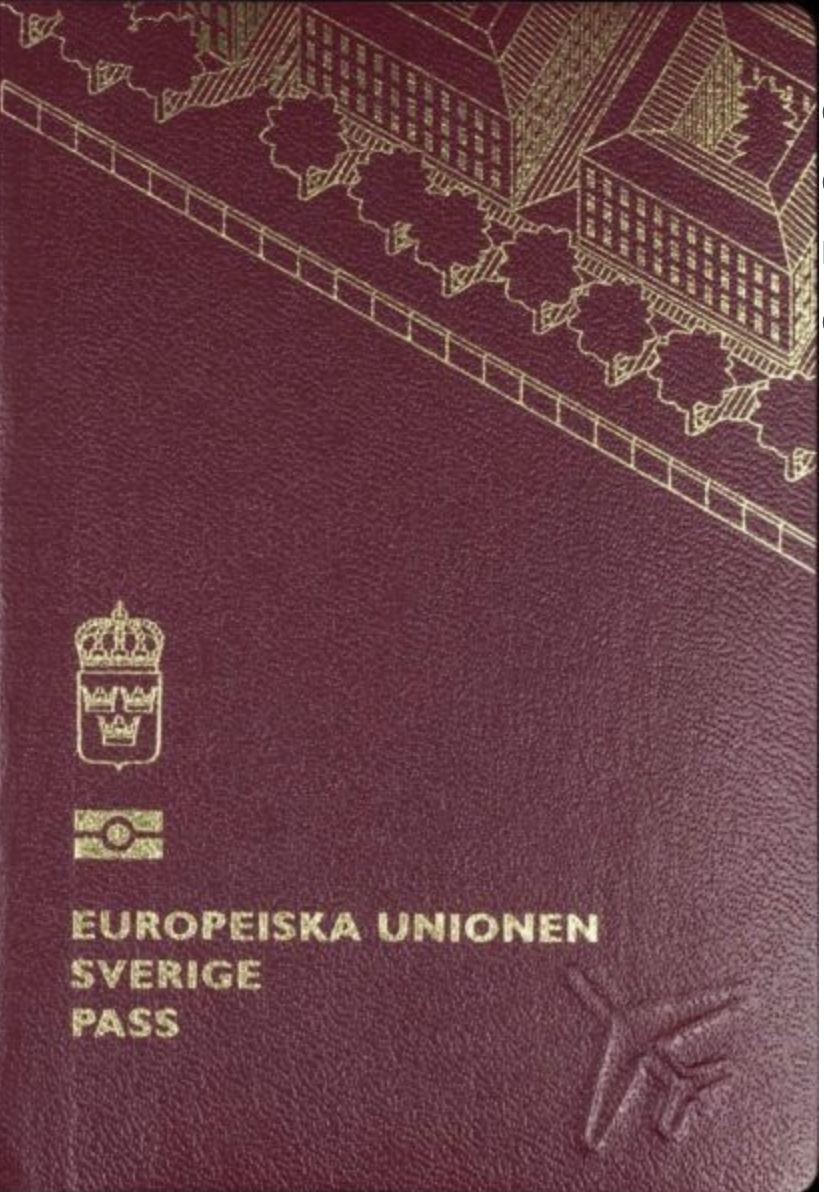
2nd generation biometric Swedish passport issued between 2012–2021.

== See also ==
- Visa requirements for Swedish citizens
- Visa policy of the Schengen Area
- Passports of the European Union
- Swedish nationality law
- Identity documents in Sweden
