= Identity documents in Sweden =

There are several identity documents used in Sweden. None are compulsory by law, meaning that there is no formal penalty for not possessing one. Certified identification cards are issued by the tax agency. The Swedish police issues passports and national identity cards for Swedish citizens. A Swedish driver's license, issued by the transport agency, is also accepted as an identity document. Banks sometimes issue identity cards for established customers or their children.

In Sweden, no law has been introduced about compulsory identity documents. However, there is no law forbidding an authority or company to demand to see one, otherwise refusing service. Identity documents are needed in Sweden in certain commonly occurring situations, e.g. purchases using debit- or credit cards when not using a PIN, or picking up a package at the postal service representatives, or for age checking when purchasing alcoholic beverages, or to get medical care and medicines. A valid Swedish identity document is also required for opening a bank account or other situations where the use of Swedish personal identity number is required, although this varies from organisation to organisation. Car drivers mandatorily need the driver's license, and the police is also allowed to randomly check driver's licenses for drivers, normally done in combination with sobriety checks.

For certain situations, the law says that safe identification is needed, without saying how it should done. In these cases a Swedish identity document is usually expected by authorities like the police. A person found committing a crime like speeding or no bus ticket, having no identity document, will be taken to the police station and kept until the identity is certified (even if identity documents are not compulsory). When the police are searching for criminals expected to have a car, they organise speeding checks or sobriety checks, since they are allowed to randomly ask for ID only in this situation. Searches for undocumented immigrants are often done in cooperation with guards checking local traffic tickets. It is a bad idea for a wanted criminal or undocumented immigrant to ride without a ticket or shoplift in Sweden, since their identity must be investigated if caught.

The most commonly used identity documents in Sweden is the driver's license (for those that have passed a driver's test) and the national identity card issued by the Police. The identity card issued by the Tax Agency is more commonly used by foreign citizens living in Sweden and not by Swedish citizens, because the identity card issued by the Tax Agency cost the same as the identity card issued by the Police, but the Tax Agency identity card is of lesser use since it cannot be used for travel within the European Union.

== History ==
Historically in Sweden, it was the banks and the Swedish postal service that first saw a need that people should have identity documents. They issued identity documents for anyone having a Swedish Personal Identity Number. To prove the identity for this, relative simple routines were used, like having bank account documents, driver's licence or passport, being recognised by the bank staff or bringing a friend with an identity document. These routines were used for decades from the 1960s until the 21st century although the security routines were strengthened during the time. Swedish passports were banned as an identity document during several years because they were relatively easy to forge, and allowed again after they were made more secure in 1998. The driver's licences had enough security to be accepted by the banks and became the most commonly used identity document.

Authorities saw the need of checking identity of people in certain situations, to make sure which personal identity number the person in front of them had. For example, handling payment for sick leave, driver's licence tests or police arrests. For this usually the identity documents accepted by the banks were allowed, because there was no law regarding identity documents and how they were issued.

Around year 2005 banks strengthened their routine to issue identity cards, so only near relatives verifiable by the banks, in reality only parents or adult children, could guarantee the identity of some who had no valid identity document. This other person needed a valid Swedish identity document. The reason was the existence of identity fraud, and that banks had to pay compensation to people affected. The cashier service owned by the postal service followed this rule in 2007. There was no law about these rules or saying that banks or the cashier service had to issue these cards. As a consequence, everyone who did not have any Swedish parent or adult child could not get an identity document. Swedish citizens could get a passport, but not citizens of other countries resident in Sweden. In e.g. Norway and Denmark, immigrants could get a bank id card based on the residence permit and foreign passport, but not in Sweden, since no rule regulated it and the Swedish Migration Board did also not want to guarantee the identity.

The government decided that they should take the responsibility to issue identity documents to people in Sweden, and issues a law. As a consequence of this, the Swedish Tax Agency started issuing certified identity cards in August 2009. During two and a half years, foreign citizens without a parent resident in Sweden could not get an identity document, if they had none.

Still in 2010 several thousands of people are unable to get identity documents.

Since the entry into the Schengen area in 2001, the Swedish police randomly asks for identity documents in crowded places, stating suspicion of illegal stay by foreign citizens as reason (In-country foreigner checks, Swedish:"Inre utlänningskontroll"). According to allegations, skin color was used as indication of illegal stay (an indication of crime is needed to justify identity document checks).

== Domestic identity documents ==
=== National identity card ===
The national identity card is issued by the Swedish police and applications are filed at police stations which have a passport office. The national identity card can only be obtained by Swedish citizens. It is a valid identity document within the European union, since 1 July 2015 also including member states which are not part of the Schengen Area. The card is valid for five years.

The card is equipped with a contact chip prepared for being able to function as an electronic identity card (eID) at a later date, and also a contactless RFID chip containing the card's printed data in a digital format along with the photograph in a JPEG format along with a digital key to verify that the data contained is authentic and hasn't been tampered with. The data in the contactless card can only be accessed after using the printed codes on the back side of the card.

To get one another valid identity document is needed, or a person from a similar list as the tax agency card vouching the identity, but there is no "balanced assessment" or "residence permit" routine.

=== Identity cards from the Tax Agency ===
Certified identification cards can be obtained by anyone who is population registered in Sweden, that is over 13 years of age, and has a Swedish personal identity number. The Swedish Tax Agency issues identity cards for anyone fulfilling the requirement of being population registered in Sweden, and can provide an accepted means of identifying oneself. This last rule caused many problems for foreigners and even some Swedes between 2007 and 2010.

As of 1 October 2010 in order to get a Swedish ID card, the following are required:

- Age 13 or over (people aged 13–17 must have legal guardian present at application) (Swedish citizens can get a passport or national id card as newborns)
- A Swedish Personal Identity Number.
- 400 SEK paid to the Swedish Tax Agency via a Swedish bank, prior to your application.
- To verify your identity with EITHER an approved ID document, limited to:

1. A Swedish issued ID card (either from a government agency, such as a Swedish national ID or Driver's licence, or another that conforms to the SIS security standard, such as ID cards issued by banks),
2. A Swedish passport issued on or after 1 September 2006 (Red cover with embedded biometrics),
3. A valid passport from EU or from Iceland, Liechtenstein, Norway or Switzerland
- OR, a Residence Permit
- OR, someone to vouch for your identity in person at the time of application, having one of the above approved ID document, being at least 18 years old and limited to:
1. Parents/Guardians, Foster Parents, Grandparents, Siblings, Half-Siblings, Children, and Grandchildren,
2. Employers of at least 1 year,
3. "Trustees or administrators",
4. Public officials from a local or state authority with whom you have a professional relationship, such as a social welfare secretary, a refugee administrator (or similar), an institution superintendent, or an international adviser at a state university. There has been trouble that such officials have denied doing that claiming they could not 100% guarantee the identity or did not have the time needed to visit the tax office with every applicant.

- If one fails to meet these requirements, one can also request a "balanced assessment". In this case, the Tax Agency will compare the information on your application with what is on file with other agencies and make a decision. An expired passport, a passport from non-EU/EEA countries and/or a former employer might be sufficient combined with other information.
- One's photo taken and your height measured at the Tax Agency office when you apply.

Processing time to receive a card is two business weeks from time of approval. Approval times ranges from instant to eight weeks, depending on your situation. Foreigners using a residency permit to verify their identity face longer wait times due to the fact that the immigration board does not collect digital captures of signatures, and in order to instantly approve an application, the employee taking the application must be able to match the signed signature to something on file. Foreign passports will be checked with the home country which might take time.

Still the identity cards are not 100.0% reliable, since there might still be people prepared to do false certification. For example, it has happened that parents with adult children have vouched for other people to be their child, who got id cards in the children's name, being able to get bank loans and credit cards etc. Cards might be stolen and people have a responsibility to report stolen id cards as soon as possible. Forged or stolen id cards is also a growing problem.

=== Other ID Cards ===
Most of the Swedish banks can issue identity cards for their customers, but have generally stopped doing so. They still often issue ID cards to children (age 13 or above) of established customers, as a way of getting new customers. Some businesses and government authorities issue SIS certified identification cards to their employees, accepted as identity documents. Examples include police officers and journalists. Others issue more simple cards only usable inside the company.

=== Driver's license ===
Driver's licenses are issued by the Swedish Transport Agency to residents in Sweden, and are generally accepted as identity documents in the same manner as the identification cards issued by the banks and postal service. To obtain one, either an EU driver's license can be exchanged to a Swedish one, or a full skill test must be done. The test requires possession of a valid Swedish identity document (such as one issued by the Tax agency) or an EU/EFTA passport (EU/EFTA ID cards not accepted). People without a valid document should get an identity card first. Driver's license have a little less security than identity cards as they have less technical security features. Recently the Transport Agency started taking photos for the drivers license instead of sending it into the agency to improve the security of the drivers license. Still they are considered having at least as high trustworthiness as id cards because people with good economy usually have driver's licenses, and id cards are mostly used by people without a license. Driver's licenses are valid for five years if they allow heavy vehicle driving, and ten years otherwise.

=== Passport ===
The burgundy-colour Swedish passports issued since 1998 are accepted as identity documents. The blue passports issued up until 1998 are not accepted as identity documents due to insufficient security features. Passports issued since October 1, 2005 are of a biometric variety and valid for five years. Passports are issued by the Swedish police and applications are filed at police stations which have a passport office.

The passports issued since October 1, 2005 contain an RFID chip containing the passport's printed data in a digital format along with the photograph in a JPEG format along with a digital key to verify that the data contained is authentic and hasn't been tampered with. The data in the chip can only be accessed after using the printed codes on the lower part of the passport's person page. Fingerprints are stored since June 28, 2009.

== Foreign identity documents ==
Swedish citizens need a passport when travelling from Sweden directly to a non-EU/EFTA country (though not the reverse, in which case any document stating nationality, including a national ID card is sufficient) Other EU/EFTA citizens do not need a passport (if they have a national ID card) to leave EU/EFTA from Sweden.

When staying in Sweden (as opposed to crossing the border) having a passport is needed for foreign citizens, except for EU/EEA citizens. However, in order to get a Swedish driving licence or an ID card from the Tax Authority, EU/EFTA ID cards are not accepted, so unless already having a Swedish ID document, a passport is required.

When trying to obtain services requiring an identity document, foreign passports and other identification documents (including EU/EFTA ID cards) are often not accepted in Sweden. This especially happens in situations requiring the Swedish personal identity number (like in banks) as such documents do not contain said number. The security level of foreign-issued documents may also be considered insufficient. While banks have systems to verify if a particular identity document has been stolen, this only works for Swedish ones. The Schengen Information System has such info for EU/EEA passports, but only authorities can use it and not banks or post offices.

Since 2009, EU/EEA passports (but not ID cards) have been accepted as identification documents in Sweden owing to EU legislation. Banks still (2011), for theft check and Swedish personal identity number verification reasons, often still reject foreign EU passports, and recommend getting a Swedish id card issued by the tax authority, which can be obtained on the basis of an EU/EFTA passport (but not ID card).

The Nordic Passport Union extend the rule that identity documents are not needed by domestic citizens, to cover all Nordic citizens. Still identity documents might be needed for services like air or train travel, hotel stays, credit card purchase, age verification and more. For this a passport, a driver's licence (needed for car driving), or a national identity card (which Norway and Denmark don't have) can be used. Other identity cards might not be accepted since they are less known in Sweden, not the least so for Norwegian bank identity cards which are printed on the reverse of credit cards, a card type that Sweden does not have. Since January 2016 border controls have been re-instated for travelers coming from Denmark across the Oresund strait meaning that also Nordic citizens need to show an official document showing citizenship; for Danes and Norwegians this means that a passport for their part is required, although a Nordic driver's license (but no other id card) is accepted. The controls are said to be temporary but are still in place as of 30 September 2018.
