= Driving licence in Sweden =

The front of a Swedish driving licence (2009 version)

Swedish driving licences (Swedish: Körkort) adhere to a standard set in the European Economic Area. 18 years is the minimum age to obtain a licence for cars (lower for some vehicles).

== Practical training ==
The amount of practical training required varies depending on how well the student can already operate the vehicle. There's no lower limit, or requirement to document what road conditions the student trained in. In fact there's no documentation required on how much he or she has trained at all, privately or at a driver's school.

The only compulsory part is the risk education, divided into two separate parts. This is required when obtaining a licence for a passenger car (B) or a motorcycle (A1, A2, A). No other processes apart from the student obtaining a learners permit is needed before the student gets to take the final 2 tests. The risk education consists of two parts:

- Part 1 (hazard education). This theoretical learning exercise shows consequences with drinking and driving, driving and texting, and many more (uses both real and imaginary events as examples).
- Part 2 (hazard education). This tests and educates the student in maneuvering their vehicle in slippery and wet conditions, and also makes them perform effective braking tests.

== Theoretical training ==
The theoretical test in Sweden consists of eight parts.

- Phase A, B and C (traffic and risks)
- Phase Vehicle (how to maintain a vehicle)
- Phase Repeat (repetition of prior steps but with additional questions)
- Phase Final test (recreating a final test from "Vägverket")

The student needs to take the "Risk 1", theoretical training about drugs, alcohol and driving.

All these are completed on a computer with an exception for the Risk 1 which they will work together in a group while listening to an instructor.

== Driver's licences in Sweden ==
AM	15 Years of Age	Moped class I (EU moped).; Moped class II; A-Tractor (made for a maximum speed of 40 km/h); Motorized equipment class II (made for a maximum speed of 30 km/h)
A1	16 Years of Age	Light motorcycle (max 125 cm³ if the licence was issued before 1 July 1996); Light motorcycle (max 125 cm³ and 11 kW or a top speed of max 110 km/h and a power to weight ratio of less than 0.1 kW/kg); Tractor; Motorized equipment class I; Off-road scooter (if the licence was issued before 1 January 2000).
A2	18 Years of Age	Heavy motorcycle with a power less than 35 kW and a power/weight ratio less than 0.2 kW/kg. If the motorcycle is throttled down to 35 kW, its original power output must not exceed 70 kW.
A	24 / 20 Years of Age	Heavy motorcycles with a power exceeding 35 kW and a power/weight ratio exceeding 0.2 kW/kg, provided that an approved driving test has been conducted on such motorcycle (if the A2 licence has been held for 2 years or more, the mandatory age is 20).
B, B96	18 Years of Age	The B licence allows you to drive, among other things, cars and light trucks with a total weight of up to 3,500 kg.; A standard B licence allows you to tow a light trailer. The trailer is considered light if the total weight of the car and trailer does not exceed 3,500 kg, or if the total weight of the trailer does not exceed 750 kg. If the trailer weighs more than 750 kg, the total weight of the car and trailer must not exceed 3,500 kg.; Off-road vehicles (not in commercial use); Tractor (not with multiple trailers attached in commercial use).; Class I motorized equipment (=motorized equipment designed for a maximum speed exceeding 30 km/h) and Class II motorized equipment; Three- and four-wheeled motorcycles; All-terrain scooters (if the licence was issued before January 1, 2000); The B96 licence allows for the car and trailers combined maximum weight to be 4250 Kg
BE	18 Years of Age	Car or light truck with one or more trailers, regardless of trailers weight (However, the combined gross weight of the trailers must never be heavier than the set trailer weight for that vehicle).; Tractor units and heavy off-road trailers in commercial use
C	21 / 18 Years of Age	Heavy truck and a light trailer; Car with a total weight over 3.5 tons and a light trailer (Can be taken at the age of 18 if you are in an upper secondary school where C is mandatory to pass the course)
C1	18 Years of Age	With a C1 licence, you can drive trucks and cars with a total weight of up to 7,500 kg.; You may attach a light trailer with a total weight of 750 kg or less.
D	24 / 18 Years of Age	Bus and a light trailer; (The Minimum age is 18 if you are in secondary school with an orientation within public transport)
D1	21 / 18 Years of Age	With a D1 licence, you can drive buses designed and manufactured to carry a maximum of 16 passengers in addition to the driver.; The bus must not be longer than 8 meters.; (The Minimum age is 18 if you are in secondary school with an orientation within public transport)
E	Different Ages	Heavy trailers When you want to be authorized to tow heavy trailers, the authorizations are available for the three ratings B, C1, C, D1, D. These have different hierarchical order. This means that they are classified according to the highest qualification first: 1. CE 2. C1E 3. DE 4. D1E 5. BE When you take the CE, you will automatically get the E rating on all other vehicle qualifications you hold. If you have a B and C licence and take a DE licence, you will get DE, D1E and BE, not CE.

== Instruction ==
A learner's permit can be issued from age sixteen. The student may choose to learn by going to a driving school or in private with up to four different instructors. Usually a combination of the two is used. These instructors must be 24 or older and must have held a valid driver's licence for five years (it must not have been cancelled temporarily for drunk driving and other serious traffic violations, but a single speeding conviction is now acceptable). The instructors and student must go through a traffic safety course before permission is granted; it takes about three hours to complete and is usually given at all driving schools on certain dates. From 2010 it is enough for every student and every instructor to go on this course once; before that each instructor and student pair had to go together, e.g. father/elder child, mother/elder child, father/younger child, mother/younger child.

== Testing ==
When learners reach age 18 they may take a theory test (Swedish: Kunskapsprov); a score of 52 out of 65 questions is required to pass. They must also attend a hazard lesson (Swedish: Riskutbildning), which may, for instance, take place at a track which is sprayed with oil to make it slippery. First, students learn about the human factor and other dangers in traffic; then they drive the course and try to make the car spin so they can learn to control it during such situations.

Students then take a driving test. If they pass, a driver's licence is granted; it usually comes by mail a few days later. Until then newly licensed drivers are given a temporary licence (valid for a year). The licences are issued by the Swedish Transport Agency. For both tests a fully valid identity document is needed.

=== Driving test for class A (motorcycle) ===
The student must show ability to hold the weight of the motorcycle by walking with it. Then the student must do a driving test in very slow speed, in order to show balance. After that there is a test to maneuver away from obstacles at 50 km/h, and then a brake test at 70 km/h and 90 km/h.

If the student has passed these tests, a driving test in the city is performed, and then on a highway. The student must be able to handle traffic, know the traffic rules and be able to handle the acceleration of the motorcycle.

=== Driving test for class B (car) ===
The student must show knowledge of how to do a safety check of the vehicle, like checking the brakes, brake fluid, and lights. After the safety check, the student will undergo a driving test. When it comes to B licence, the student goes through three steps, city roads (for example driving in a soft manner), highway (making sure the student accelerates fast, yet driving safely for the environment and traffic safety) and housing estates (making sure the student is observant of people and pets that may move through these areas). The student must be able to handle traffic and know the traffic rules and drive in a safe manner.

=== Driving test for class C and D (heavy vehicles) ===
The theoretical test covers similar things as the car test, but also things like brakes and driving time rules.

The driver test aims partly to test ability to maneuver a large vehicle.

In order to be allowed to drive professionally (against salary) a special skill certificate is needed. A special education is needed to get it, which covers things like the driving time rules, the tachograph, load securing, and passenger safety (buses). This education is around six weeks long.

== Probation ==
The first two first years are considered a probationary period (Swedish: Prövotid). If, during that time, the driver commits any traffic offense which results in a suspended licence, the driver is required to redo all required tests rather than having the licence returned to them without action after a set period of time.

== Replacing a foreign driving licence ==
It is mandatory to have either a Swedish or EU/EEA driving licence to drive in Sweden if one has been a resident in the country for more than one year.

A person holding a driving licence from certain countries may exchange it for a Swedish licence without the need for a test. These countries are the EU/EEA nations, Switzerland and Japan. People holding a driving licence from other countries must do the full test in order to obtain a Swedish driving licence.

Holders of an EU driving licence in Sweden must pay an additional "inspection fee", on top of the standard fee for the issuing of the licence, to have their licence converted to a Swedish licence. This differs from many other European countries, where authorities charge national licence holders and EU licence holders the same fee to have a new licence issued, seeing as all EU licences are equally valid and follow a standard format.

== Identity document ==
A Swedish driving licence is valid as an identity document in Sweden. A person having a driving licence do not need a separate id card. There is not any law saying which identity document is valid for what purpose in Sweden, instead this is decided by organisations who need to identify people. Banks have been leading this and other organisations followed.

An investigation has been made in 2019 by the Swedish government about identity documents, suggesting stopping allowing driving licence as identity documents, due to lower technical security (forgeries are common) and because the driver do not need to visit any office, but can send an own photo by mail and get the licence by mail. As of 2025 driving licences are still usable as identity document.

== See also ==
- European driving licence
