= Molded carpet =

Carpets used in the interiors of cars

Molded carpet generally refers to the carpets used in the interiors of cars. The molded carpet is designed to hug the floorpans so there are no pockets of loose fitting carpet. The process of creating the molded carpet requires the original floor pans and having the carpet laid upon the pans with a backing in between.

== Backing ==
There are generally two types of backings, poly backing and mass backing. Mass backing is the original type of backing that most car makers use. It's thicker and more rubber-like than poly backing. Poly backing is lighter, easier to bend and more mesh like than mass backing. Some molded carpets come with jute backing where your feet rest on the floor pans. This helps prevent the carpet from wearing out prematurely because the majority of the wear is where feet contact the carpet. The jute padding also helps prevent mildew which was more of a problem in older leaking cars than modern cars.

== Types ==
People restoring classic cars will often freshen up the interior by putting in new carpet to cover new floor pans. When they do replace the carpet in their cars they have quite a few options in molded carpet. There are several websites that specialize in molded carpets. There are several styles of molded carpet, the most popular include 80-20 loop, cutpile and essex. Most cars from the 1940s to the mid-1970s used 80-20 loop carpet. The major exception being Cadillac which used cut pile in their cars at various times. After 1974 car makers used cut pile or essex carpet exclusively. 80-20 loop which is 80% rayon 20% nylon thus the name. It has a texture similar to berber carpet. Cut pile is what you see in modern cars. It looks like little strands of hair. Essex is a longer more plush version of cut pile carpet. It's softer to the touch than cut pile and 80-20 loop, but is also more expensive than the other two.

Most of the time, the manufacturer will bond a heel pad into the carpet. Some cars such as the Ford Mustang Mach 1 had two heel pads from the factory.

== See also ==
- Snatch strap
