= Identity card (Sweden) =

National identity card of Sweden

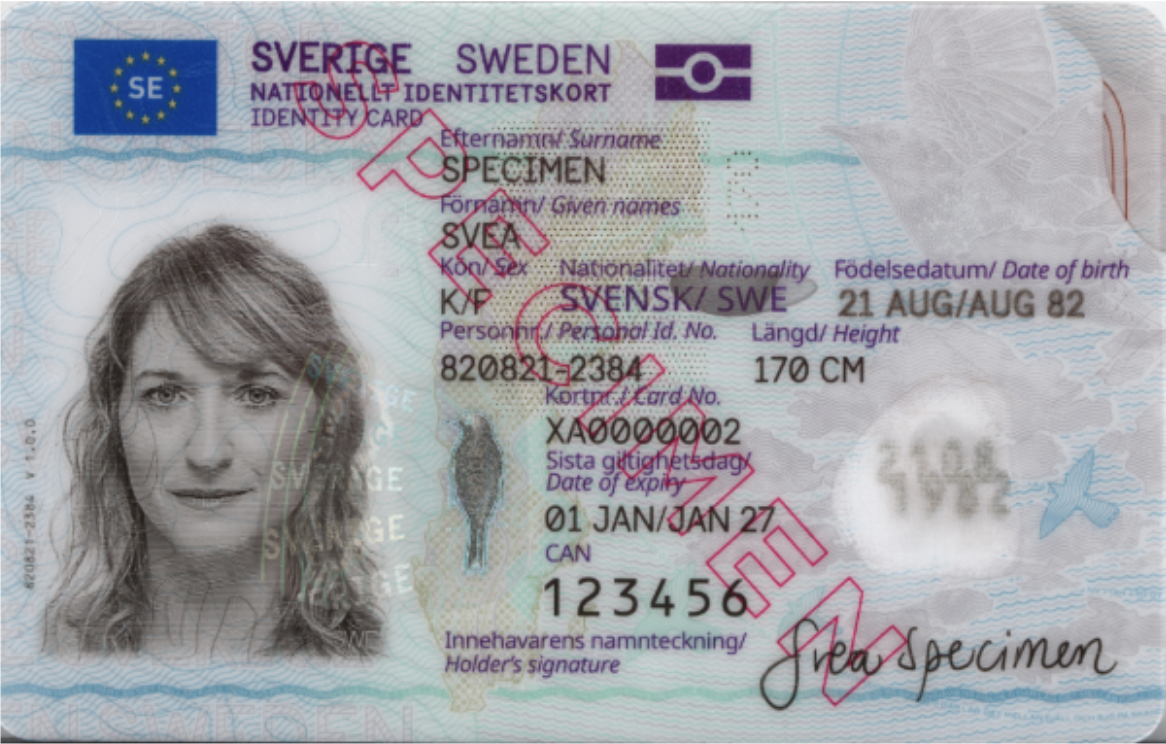

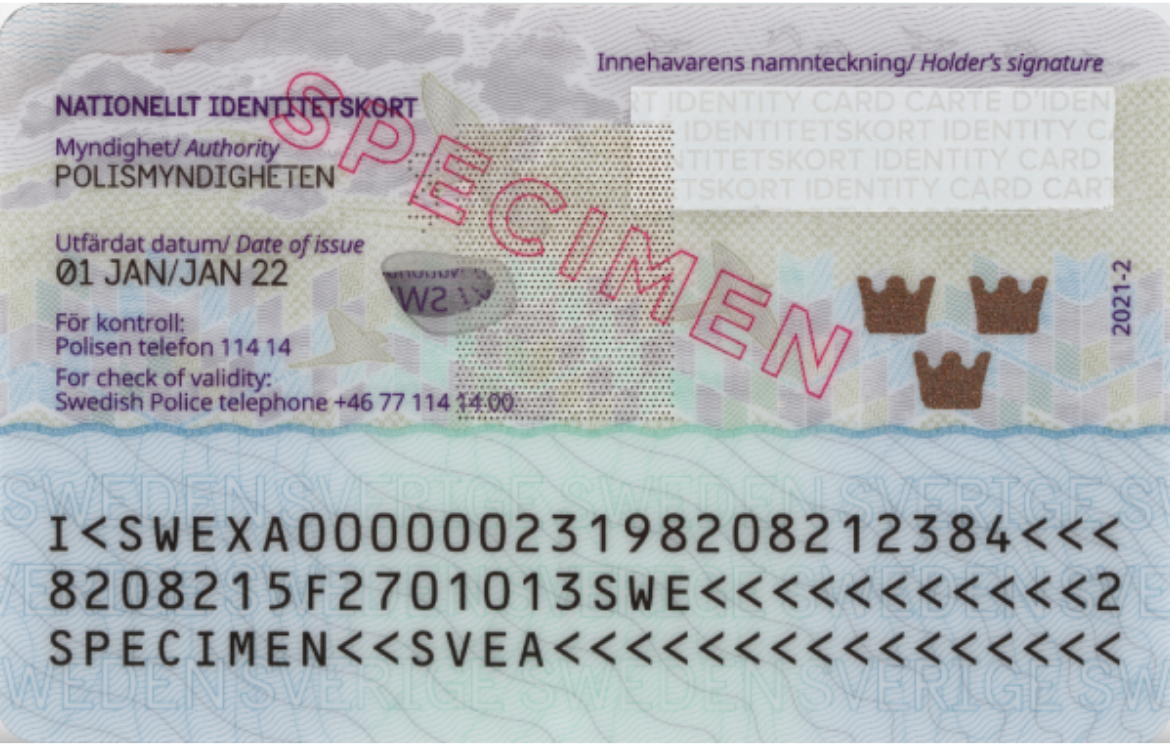
- Swedish national identity card (front and back)
- Type: Optional identity document, optional replacement for passport for travel to territories listed below.
- Issued by: Sweden
- First issued: 1 October 2005; 1 January 2022 (current)
- Valid in: EFTA; European Union; United Kingdom (EU Settlement Scheme); Rest of Europe (except Belarus, Russia, and Ukraine) Dominica (de facto); Georgia; Greenland; Montserrat (max. 14 days); Overseas France
- Expiration: 5 years

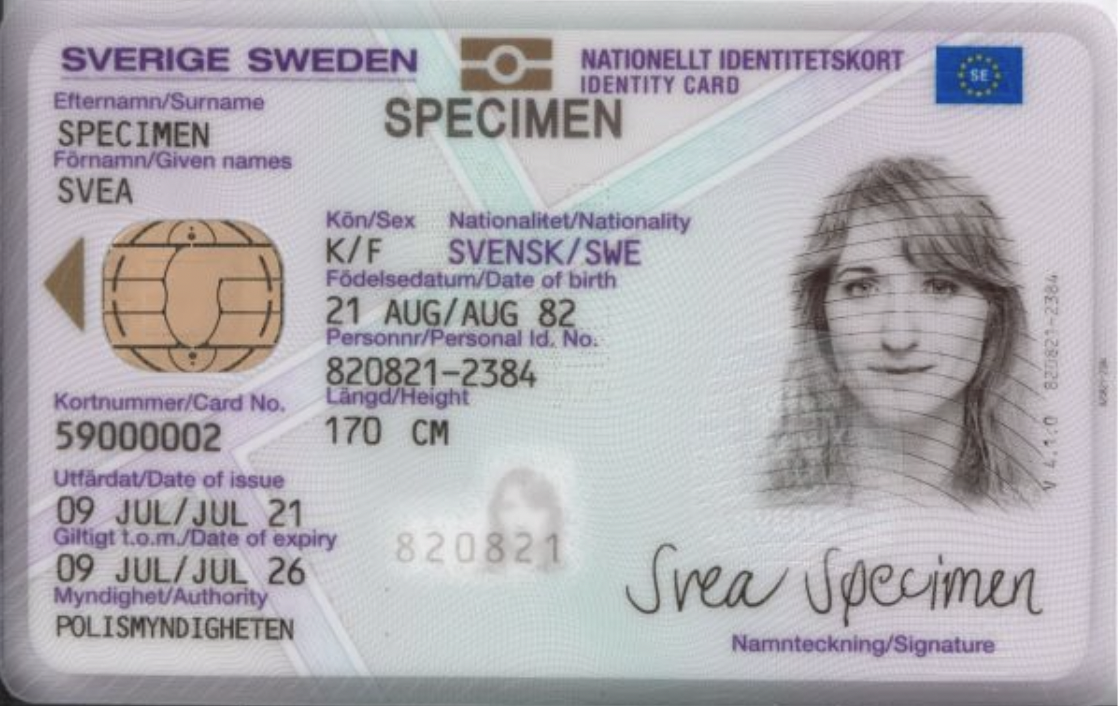
Swedish identity card (2021 version)

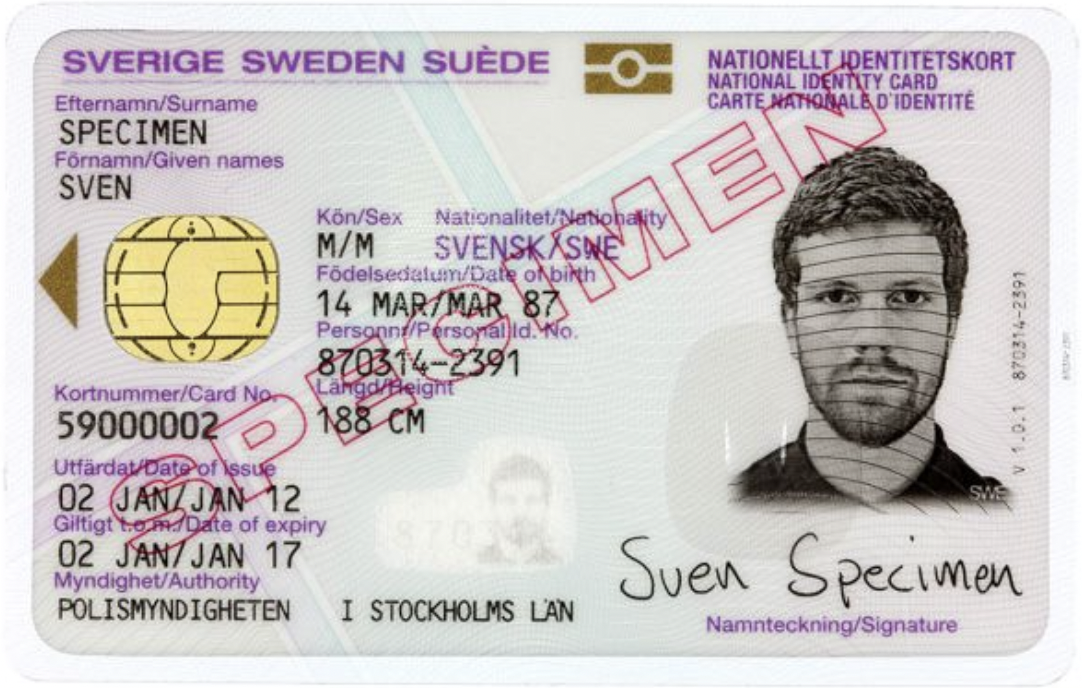
Swedish identity card (2012 version)

The front and reverse of a Swedish identity card (2007 version)

The front and reverse of a Swedish identity card (2005 version)

The Swedish identity card (Swedish: nationellt identitetskort) lit. "National Identity card" is a non-compulsory biometric identity document issued in Sweden. It is one of two official identity documents issued by the Swedish Police, the other being the Swedish passport. It is only issued to Swedish citizens, and indicates the citizenship.

The card can be used for travelling to and staying in European countries (except Belarus, Russia, Ukraine and the United Kingdom). It can also be used instead of a Swedish passport for entering Dominica (de facto), French overseas territories, Georgia, Montserrat (if in transit to a third country for max 14 days) and on package holidays to Tunisia. However, direct outbound travel from Sweden to non-EU/Schengen territories is not permitted by Swedish border police. For travel within the Nordic countries no identity documentation is legally required for Nordic citizens due to the Nordic Passport Union.

The card is often carried by people who often travel internationally, but is also the most used card among Swedish citizens who have not obtained a driver's license.

== Price, validity and application ==
The national identity card is valid for five years and costs 400 SEK. Applications are filed at police stations which have a passport office.

When applying, a valid Swedish identity document is needed in order to check the identity. If the applicant does not have a valid Swedish identity document, then the applicant must be accompanied in person by another that does have such a document. That person must be a near relative or an employer or municipal official who knows the applicant. There is no age limit to get a card, but people below 18 must be accompanied by their guardian (preferably both) at application. These rules are the same as for a Swedish passport (see that article).

== Characteristics ==
The identity card is plastic and rectangular in shape, about 86 × 54 millimetres in size. On the left-hand side is a gold-plated contact chip, and on the right-hand side is the photograph of the bearer. Along the top of the card, the name Sweden is written in three languages, Swedish, English (SVERIGE SWEDEN), below which the name of the card is available in the same three languages (Nationellt identitetskort/identity card), followed on the right by the biometric passport symbol and the nationality of the bearer in Swedish and a country code (SVENSK/SWE).

The national identity card is equipped with a contact chip ready to function as an electronic identity card (eID) at a later date, and also a contactless RFID chip at the bottom right of the rear side containing a digital representation of the printed data along with the photograph of the bearer.

=== Printed data ===
The descriptions of the fields are printed in Swedish and English.

- Card No.
- Personal Id. No.
- Holder's signature
- Height
- Date of birth
- Surname
- Given names
- Authority
- Date of issue
- Date of expiry

A machine readable zone is printed on the bottom of the reverse-side of the card.

=== Data on the RFID chip ===
As of 2007 the data on the RFID chip contained no biometric data. It has the following information:

- The card's printed data in a digital format
- The photograph in a JPEG format
- A digital key to verify that the data is authentic and has not been tampered with
- Beginning August 2021, it contains fingerprint information

The contents of the RFID chip cannot be accessed without using the codes found in the machine-readable area on the back of the card.

== Other identity cards in Sweden ==
Nationals of any country who are legally resident in Sweden can get certified identification cards issued by the Tax Agency or their bank. Driving licences (if approved as a driver) are issued by the Transport Agency and usable as identification cards. However, none of these documents state the holder's citizenship and – whilst valid as travel documentation in the Nordic Union – are not recognised as official immigration documents by most other authorities in the EU. There is a political principle in Sweden that foreign citizens with residence permits shall be treated equally with citizens, and should not be identified more than necessary.

== See also ==
- National identity cards in the European Economic Area
