= Off-road trailer =

Type of vehicle trailer

An off-road trailer is designed to be towed behind a 4x4 or off-road vehicle to remote places not possible with a standard utility trailer. Most off-road trailers are associated with Overlanding, the self-reliant exploration of remote locales where the journey is as important as the destination.

== Types of off-road trailers ==
=== Caravan ===
Hard-sided, all living space, and storage are contained inside the trailer. it can have slide-out space such as an outdoor kitchen or gallery.

=== Pop-Up ===
A small compact trailer is designed as storage with slide-out features for kitchen or additional storage. Living space is packed down for travel and expanded for camping. Living space can be a pop-up or out that extends from the trailer. When packed, exterior height and center of gravity is often lower than traditional caravan, significantly reducing risk of rollover when offroading.

=== Tear Drop ===
While some teardrop trailers are not off-road specific many teardrops are designed with rugged tires, sturdy materials, and suspension flexibility to be taken off the pavement. All storage and living space is contained inside the trailer. Most models have the kitchen outside with a separate door or opening.

=== Military/Utility (M416/M101) ===
Retired military trailers are built to withstand rough terrain and conditions often associated with combat zones, which makes them overbuilt for most off-road travel. The trailer is often used as storage and a rooftop tent is typically placed on the top. Trailer models range from 3/4-2-ton payload and were made in a variety of bed configurations.

== Features ==
An off-road trailer has a very distinct difference from a normal pull-behind trailer. An off-road trailer can be taken on a rough trail or road that is only accessible with a 4x4 or AWD vehicle. The trailer will also have several recovery points. The ground clearance is higher than a standard trailer. Frame and body are made of durable lightweight materials. Tires will be all-terrain, mud or off-road made from a thick durable material that is not easily punctured. Large approach, breakover and departure angles. Strong, straight through steel frame, similar to those under high payload trucks used in the construction industry. Rigid solar panels connected to high capacity 12 V lithium batteries and 12 to 240 V inverter. High capacity fuel and drinking water tanks. Air suspension or dual shocks per wheel. External mount for rooftop tent and/or off-road equipment such as shovel, traction boards, hi-lift jack.

== Additional articles ==
Why Off-Road Trailers Are All The Rage.

Off-Road Trailer Buying Guide.

A Tough Little Offroad Trailer That Looks Ready for Anything.

Off-Road Camper Trailers.

What Type of Off-Road Camper Should I Buy?

What is Overlanding.
