= Snatch strap =

A snatch strap is a length of special webbing used to help in the recovery of vehicles bogged in sand or mud.

== Description ==
Snatch straps are manufactured from webbing that is capable of approximately 20% stretch under load. This stretching property allows the strap to store kinetic energy, which is used to pull vehicles from a bog. Snatch straps are typically between 6 and 15 m (20 and 49 ft) in length, with 9 m (30 ft) being a common size. Snatch straps also have ratings of permissible working load - e.g. 8,000 kg.

== Application ==
A snatch strap is used by attaching one end to a rated recovery point on the bogged vehicle (e.g. a recovery hook or loop on the chassis). A second vehicle is required to do the recovery. The snatch strap is laid out on the ground in the direction the bogged vehicle is to be recovered (either forwards or backwards), with an "S" bend in the middle approximately 1m in length.

The recovery vehicle is backed up so that the snatch strap can be attached to a second rated recovery point on the rear of the recovery vehicle. The recovery vehicle then drives off, and the strap begins to stretch, building up potential energy, until the force keeping the vehicle bogged is overcome, at which point the bogged vehicle is pulled forward (or "snatched", hence the name).
