= Recovery point =

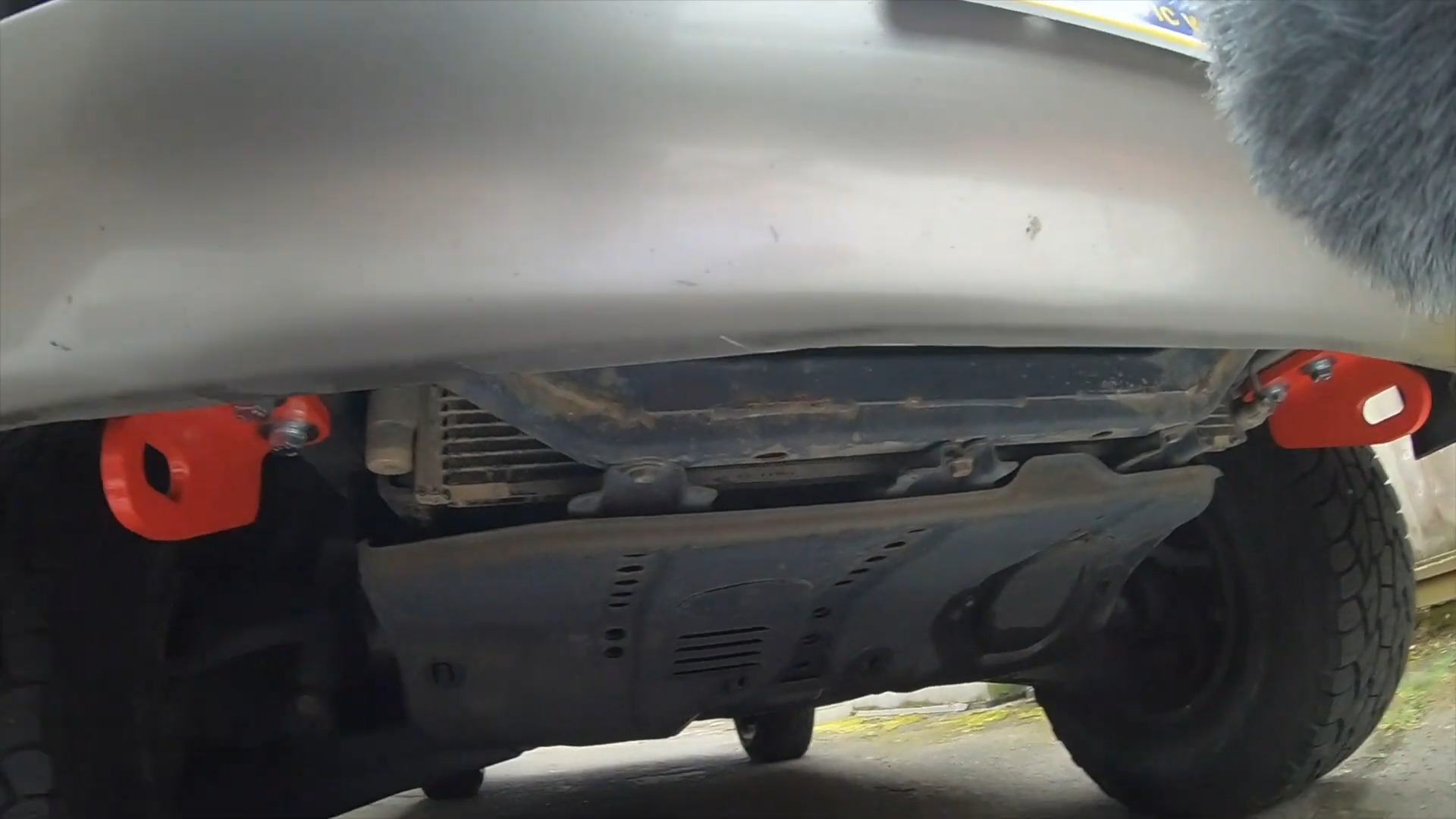
Recovery points installed on a 2001 Lexus LX 470

A recovery point is a part of a car which can be used to recover the vehicle if it becomes stuck (bogged).

Recovering a vehicle using a recovery point involves attaching a winch or a snatch strap to the recovery point.

Recovery points should be rated - that is they should specify what load they are designed to take. Using non-rated parts of a vehicle for recovery may cause property damage, injury or death. Recovery points may be fitted by the manufacturer, or as an after-market modification.

Snatch straps should never be attached to tow hitches, as they are not designed to take the load that snatching places upon them. A broken towball attached to a snatch strap can be lethal.

Off-roaders should be aware of where the recovery points are located on their vehicles before they require their use. Having recovery points on both the front and back of the vehicle is preferable.
