= Swedish nationality law =

Swedish Citizenship Act

Parliament of Sweden
- Long title: An Act relating to Swedish citizenship
- Enacted by: Government of Sweden
- Status: Current legislation

Swedish nationality law determines entitlement to Swedish citizenship. Citizenship of Sweden is based primarily on the principle of jus sanguinis. In other words, citizenship is conferred primarily by birth to a Swedish parent, irrespective of place of birth.

In general, children born in Sweden to foreign parents do not acquire Swedish citizenship at birth, although if they remain resident in Sweden they may become citizens later on.

Swedish law was significantly amended with effect from 1 July 2001 and from that date, dual citizenship is permitted without restriction.

== Birth ==
A child born after 1 April 2015 acquires Swedish citizenship automatically if:

- one of the parents is a Swedish citizen at the time of the child's birth
- a deceased parent of the child was a Swedish citizen upon their death

A child born before 1 April 2015 acquired Swedish citizenship at birth if:

- the child's father was a Swedish citizen and was married to the child's mother; or,
- the child's father was a Swedish citizen, the child was born out of wedlock, and the child was born in Sweden; or,
- the child's mother was a Swedish citizen, and the child was born on or after 1 July 1979.

For example, a child born to a Swedish father and a non-Swedish mother will not be Swedish if either: their parents are not married to each other or if their parents were not married when the child was conceived and they were born outside of Sweden, unless the father sends notification to an embassy or consulate with the child's passport, birth certificate, proof of his own citizenship at the time of the birth, and a certificate of paternity. A child who is born abroad and whose father is a Swedish citizen (not married to the child's mother, and the mother is not Swedish) will acquire Swedish citizenship when their parents get married, provided the child is aged under 18.

=== Older legislation ===
The law that governed the transmission of citizenship before the Citizenship Act of 2001 was the Citizenship Act of 1894 (law number 71, 1 October 1894), with intervening reforms in 1924, 1950, and 1979.

== Adoption ==
A child who is aged under 12 and who has been adopted by a Swedish citizen automatically receives Swedish citizenship upon adoption if

- the child has been adopted as the result of a decision taken in Sweden or in another Nordic Council country
- the child has been adopted as the result of a decision taken abroad and approved in Sweden by the Swedish Intercountry Adoptions Authority
- the adoption is valid under Swedish law.

The adoption must have been officially decided or approved after 30 June 1992.

A child aged 12 or more at the time of adoption may acquire Swedish citizenship by application.

== Naturalization as a Swedish citizen ==
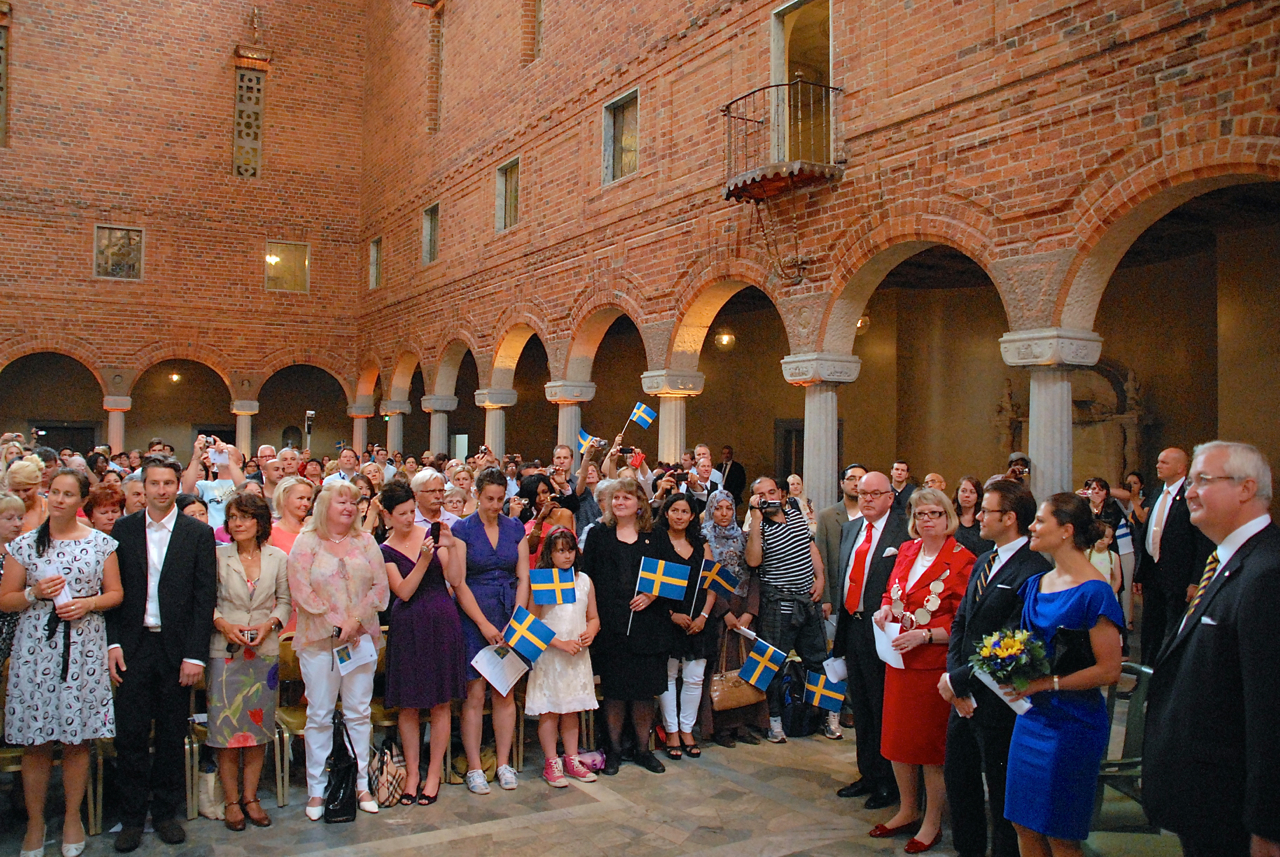
Swedish citizenship ceremony inside Stockholm City Hall on 6 June 2011.

Swedish citizenship can be acquired by naturalization, also known as citizenship by application.

A foreigner may be granted Swedish citizenship upon meeting certain requirements:

- able to prove identity
- 18 years of age or older
- has a permanent residence permit or
- has a right of residence or residence card (applies to EU citizens or close relatives of EU citizens)
- meets the requirements for habitual residence
- has maintained good conduct while in Sweden
- Has Had a work/residence permit for 8 years or more

For EU/EEA citizens and their family members that have been legal residents of Sweden for eight years and have not requested a certificate of permanent right of residence or applied for a permanent residence card, the government shall determine whether a person meets the conditions for right of residence when a person apply for Swedish citizenship.

The duration of stay is calculated from the date on which a person submitted her or his application for a residence permit and were approved. Short trips are not considered in the calculated time but if a person has been abroad for more than six weeks total in a year, the whole period they were outside Sweden is deducted from the period of habitual residence. If they move to another country and settle there their habitual residence is interrupted and will start to count once again from the day they move back to Sweden again.

A number of exemptions apply to the residence period:

- the residence period is reduced to five years for recognised refugees and stateless persons.
- citizens of other Nordic Council countries are only required to have two years' residence in Sweden.
- former Swedish citizens
- those employed on Swedish ships
- persons employed abroad by Swedish corporations
- a person with previous long residence in Sweden

For those married to, living in a registered partnership with or cohabiting with a Swedish citizen, they can apply for Swedish citizenship after seven years. In these cases, they must have been living together for the past five years. It is not enough to be married to one another, they must also live together.

Sweden requires language and civics tests for citizenship.

== Citizenship by notification ==
Notification is a simpler method of acquiring Swedish citizenship (i.e. simplified naturalisation). Those not eligible for notification may still be eligible for naturalisation by application.

Categories of persons eligible for citizenship by notification include:

=== Stateless persons ===
A stateless person may acquire Swedish citizenship by notification if that person has a permanent resident permit and falls into one of the following categories:

- born in Sweden and aged less than five;
- aged under 18 and in the custody of a Swedish citizen;
- have turned 18 but are under 21 and resident in Sweden since age 15.

=== Young persons resident in Sweden ===
Swedish citizenship may be acquired by notification by young persons who hold a permanent resident permit in the following cases:

- aged under 18 and resident in Sweden for three years
- have a permanent residence permit in Sweden, have turned 18 but are under 21, and have been resident in Sweden since turning 13.

=== Former Swedish citizens ===
Former Swedish citizens who hold permanent resident permits may acquire Swedish citizenship by notification if the following conditions are fulfilled:

- aged 18 or over
- resident in Sweden for 10 years preceding age 18.
- resident in Sweden for the 2 years preceding the application

Those former Swedish citizens who are citizens of other Nordic countries may acquire Swedish citizenship by notification immediately upon resuming residence in Sweden.

=== Citizens of Nordic countries ===
Adult citizens of other Nordic Council countries (Denmark, Norway, Iceland and Finland) are eligible for citizenship by notification, provided they have resided in Sweden for five years, without being sentenced to incarceration.

== Loss of Swedish citizenship ==
Although dual citizenship is permitted, a Swedish citizen who was born outside Sweden and is a citizen of another country will lose Swedish citizenship at age 22 unless he or she is granted approval to retain Swedish citizenship between ages 18–21. However, approval is not required if:

- the person has ever been domiciled in Sweden; or
- the person has ever been in Sweden under circumstances that indicate a link with Sweden.
- The person has domiciled for 7 years in a country participating in the Nordic Council.

In such cases the Swedish citizenship is retained.

== Dual citizenship ==
With effect from 1 July 2001, a Swedish citizen acquiring a foreign citizenship does not lose Swedish citizenship.

Former Swedish citizens who lost Swedish citizenship prior to this date (upon naturalisation in another country) were given a two-year period to re-acquire Swedish citizenship by declaration. Children of former Swedish citizens were also eligible to acquire Swedish citizenship by declaration. The deadline for submission of applications was 30 June 2003.

The changes to the law also mean that foreigners seeking naturalisation as a Swedish citizen do not need to renounce their former citizenship. They may retain it if the law of the other country permits them to do so. Swedish citizens who nonetheless hold Japanese citizenship must normally, under Japan's nationality law, notify Japan's Ministry of Justice, before turning 22, whether to keep their Swedish or Japanese citizenship.

Prior to 1 July 2001, Swedish citizens were still able to legally hold dual citizenship in certain circumstances, for example, if the other citizenship was acquired automatically at birth.

== Citizenship of the European Union ==
Because Sweden forms part of the European Union, Swedish citizens are also citizens of the European Union under European Union law and thus enjoy rights of free movement and have the right to vote in elections for the European Parliament. When in a non-EU country where there is no Swedish embassy, Swedish citizens have the right to get consular protection from the embassy of any other EU country present in that country. Swedish citizens can live and work in any country within the EU as a result of the right of free movement and residence granted in Article 21 of the EU Treaty.

== Travel freedom of Swedish citizens ==
Visa requirements for Swedish citizens

Visa requirements for Swedish citizens are administrative entry restrictions by the authorities of other states placed on citizens of Sweden. As of May 2018, Swedish citizens had visa-free or visa on arrival access to 187 countries and territories, ranking the Swedish passport third in the world according to the Visa Restrictions Index.

The Swedish nationality is ranked seventh in The Quality of Nationality Index (QNI). This index differs from the Visa Restrictions Index, which focuses on external factors including travel freedom. The QNI considers, in addition, to travel freedom on internal factors such as peace & stability, economic strength, and human development as well.
