= Visa policy of Greenland =

Policy on permits required to enter Greenland

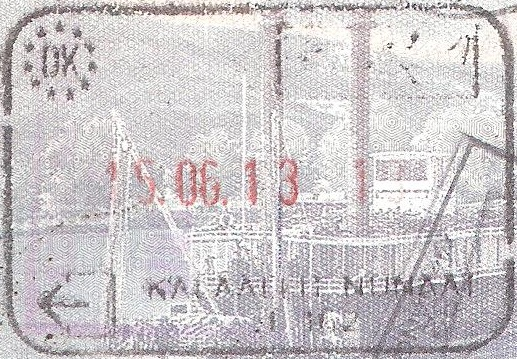
Exit stamp from Greenland on a United States passport

The visa policy of Greenland consists of the requirements for foreign nationals to enter and remain in Greenland.

Greenland (Greenlandic: Kalaallit Nunaat) is an autonomous country (Danish: land) of the Kingdom of Denmark. Nationals of Nordic countries are free to enter, reside and work in Greenland, and nationals of other countries exempt from visas for short stays in the Schengen Area may also visit Greenland without a visa. In addition, travel between Greenland and the Schengen Area is not subject to document checks.

However, Greenland is not part of the European Union or the Schengen Area, so nationals of EU or Schengen countries, except for Nordic countries, do not have the right to reside in Greenland freely, and visas or resident permits issued for entering Schengen countries are not valid for travel to Greenland. Specific visas for Greenland can be obtained in consular establishments of the Kingdom of Denmark, and their conditions are similar to those for Schengen visas.

Visas for Greenland are not valid for travel to the Schengen Area. Most people travelling to Greenland would transfer in Denmark or Iceland, for which they need a Schengen transit visa if they are not visa-free, because the flights to Greenland count as inside Schengen.

== Visa exemption ==
Greenland Freedom of movement Visa not required (90 days) Visa required

=== Freedom of movement ===
Nationals of Nordic countries (Denmark, Finland, Iceland, Norway and Sweden) are free to enter, reside and work in Greenland.

=== Short stays ===
Nationals of countries exempt from visas for short stays in the Schengen Area (EU, Schengen and Annex II countries) may visit Greenland without a visa for up to 90 days. Since March 2026, this also applies to residence permit holders in those countries.

Visas issued for entering Schengen countries are not valid for travel to Greenland, so nationals of countries that are not exempt must have a specific visa for Greenland. This visa may be requested from a Danish diplomatic mission or the Danish Immigration Service. The application procedure for this visa is the same as for a Schengen visa, and it is possible to request both visas with a single application.

== Travel documents ==
Nationals of Nordic countries may travel to Greenland with a passport or identity card. Nationals of other countries, including other EU and Schengen countries, must hold a passport to travel to Greenland.

Travel documents are not checked when travelling directly between Greenland and the Schengen Area, but travellers are still advised to carry acceptable identification.

== See also ==
- Visa policy of the Schengen Area
- Visa policy of the Faroe Islands
