= Visa policy of the Faroe Islands =

Policy on permits required to enter the Faroe Islands

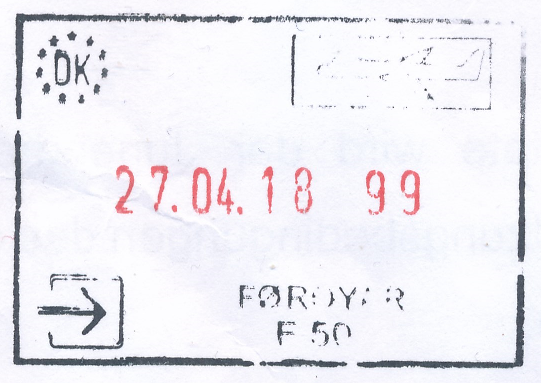
Entry stamp from Vágar Airport on a blank sheet

The Faroe Islands are an autonomous territory of the Kingdom of Denmark. Nationals of Nordic countries are free to enter, reside and work in the Faroe Islands, and nationals of other countries exempt from visas for short stays in the Schengen Area may also visit the Faroe Islands without a visa. In addition, travel between the Faroe Islands and the Schengen Area is not subject to document checks.

However, the Faroe Islands are not part of the European Union or the Schengen Area, so nationals of EU or Schengen countries, except for Nordic countries, do not have the right to reside in the Faroe Islands freely, and visas or resident permits issued for entering Schengen countries are not valid for travel to the Faroe Islands. Specific visas for the Faroe Islands can be obtained in consular establishments of the Kingdom of Denmark, and their conditions are similar to those for Schengen visas. Visas for the Faroe Islands are not valid for travel to the Schengen Area. Most people travelling to the Faroe Islands would transfer in Denmark or another Schengen country, for which they need a Schengen transit visa, because the flights or boat to the Faroe Islands count as inside Schengen.

== Visa exemptions ==
Faroe Islands Freedom of movement Visa not required (90 days), identity card accepted Visa not required (90 days) Visa required

=== Freedom of movement ===
Nationals of Nordic countries (Denmark, Finland, Iceland, Norway and Sweden) are free to enter, reside and work in the Faroe Islands. If flying from outside the Schengen Area, they still need a passport or national id card showing their citizenship.

=== Short stays ===
Nationals of countries exempt from visas for short stays in the Schengen Area (EU, Schengen and Annex II countries) may visit the Faroe Islands without a visa for up to 90 days. Since March 2026, this also applies to residence permit holders in those countries.

Visas issued for entering Schengen countries are not valid for travel to the Faroe Islands, so nationals of countries that are not exempt must have a specific visa for the Faroe Islands. This visa may be requested from a Danish diplomatic mission or the Danish Immigration Service. The application procedure for this visa is the same as for a Schengen visa, and it is possible to request both visas with a single application.

== Travel documents ==
Nationals of EU and Schengen countries may travel to the Faroe Islands with a passport or identity card. Nationals of other countries must hold a passport to travel to the Faroe Islands.

Travel documents are not checked when travelling directly between the Faroe Islands and the Schengen Area, but travellers are still advised to carry acceptable identification.

== See also ==
- Visa policy of Greenland
- Visa policy of the Schengen Area
