= List of diplomatic missions in Norway =

This article lists diplomatic missions resident in Norway. At present, the capital city of Oslo hosts 70 embassies. Several other countries have ambassadors accredited to Norway, with most being resident in Stockholm, Copenhagen and London.

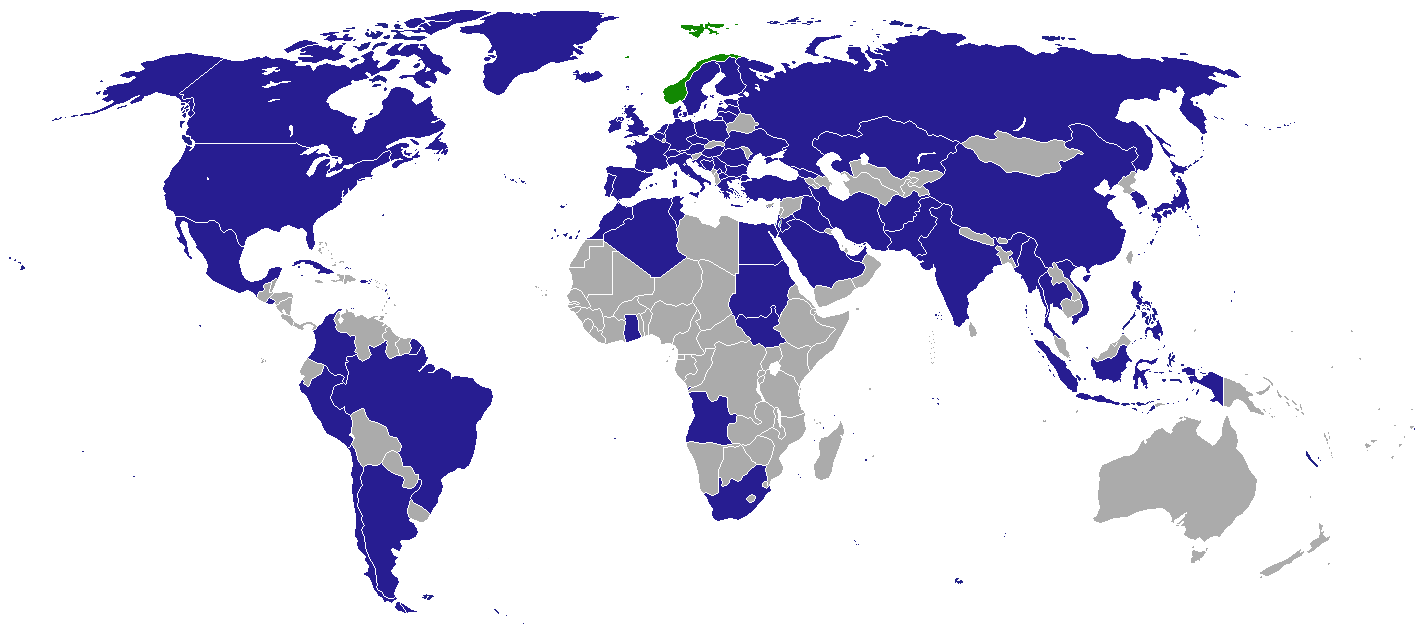
Map of diplomatic missions in Norway

== Diplomatic missions in Oslo ==
Country	Mission type	Photo
Afghanistan	Embassy	
Algeria	Embassy	
Angola	Embassy	
Argentina	Embassy	
Austria	Embassy	
Belgium	Embassy	
Bosnia and Herzegovina	Embassy	
Brazil	Embassy	
Bulgaria	Embassy	
Canada	Embassy	
Chile	Embassy	
China	Embassy	
Colombia	Embassy	
Croatia	Embassy	
Cuba	Embassy	
Czech Republic	Embassy	
Denmark	Embassy	
Egypt	Embassy	
El Salvador	Embassy	
Estonia	Embassy	
Finland	Embassy	
France	Embassy	
Georgia	Embassy	
Germany	Embassy	
Ghana	Embassy	-
Greece	Embassy	
Hungary	Embassy	
Iceland	Embassy	
India	Embassy	
Indonesia	Embassy	
Iran	Embassy	
Iraq	Embassy	
Ireland	Embassy	
Israel	Embassy	
Italy	Embassy	
Japan	Embassy	
Jordan	Embassy	-
Kazakhstan	Embassy	
Kosovo	Embassy	-
Latvia	Embassy	
Lithuania	Embassy	
Mexico	Embassy	
Morocco	Embassy	
Myanmar	Embassy	
Netherlands	Embassy	
North Macedonia	Embassy	
Pakistan	Embassy	
Palestine	Embassy	-
Peru	Embassy	
Philippines	Embassy	
Poland	Embassy	
Portugal	Embassy	
Romania	Embassy	
Russia	Embassy	
Saudi Arabia	Embassy	
Serbia	Embassy	
South Africa	Embassy	
Republic of Korea	Embassy	
South Sudan	Embassy	
Spain	Embassy	
Sudan	Embassy	
Sweden	Embassy	
Switzerland	Embassy	
Thailand	Embassy	
Tunisia	Embassy	
Turkey	Embassy	
Ukraine	Embassy	
United Arab Emirates	Embassy	
United Kingdom	Embassy	
United States	Embassy	
Vietnam	Embassy	

== Consulates in Norway ==
Country	Mission type	City	Photo
Russia	Consulate-General	Barentsburg	-
Russia	Consulate-General	Kirkenes	-

== Representative offices ==
- European Union (Delegation)
- Sahrawi Republic (Representative Office)

== Non-resident embassies ==
=== Resident in Berlin, Germany ===
1. Brunei
2. Burundi
3. Chad
4. Guinea
5. Kyrgyzstan
6. Liberia
7. Maldives
8. Mali
9. Oman
10. Togo

=== Resident in Brussels, Belgium ===
1. Barbados
2. Djibouti
3. Guyana
4. Honduras
5. Mauritania

=== Resident in Copenhagen, Denmark ===
1. Australia
2. Burkina Faso
3. Libya
4. Luxembourg
5. Nepal
6. Niger
7. Slovenia
8. Uganda

=== Resident in The Hague, Netherlands ===
1. Kuwait
2. Senegal
3. Suriname
4. Yemen

=== Resident in London, United Kingdom ===
1. Bahrain
2. Cambodia
3. Cameroon
4. Congo-Kinshasa
5. Gabon
6. Gambia
7. Jamaica
8. Madagascar
9. Malawi
10. Mauritius
11. Paraguay
12. Seychelles
13. Sierra Leone
14. Trinidad and Tobago
15. Turkmenistan
16. Uzbekistan

=== Resident in Stockholm, Sweden ===
1. Albania
2. Armenia
3. Azerbaijan
4. Bangladesh
5. Belarus
6. Botswana
7. Congo-Brazzaville
8. Cyprus
9. Dominican Republic
10. Ecuador
11. Eritrea
12. Ethiopia
13. Holy See
14. Kenya
15. Laos
16. Lebanon
17. Malaysia
18. Moldova
19. Mongolia
20. Mozambique
21. Namibia
22. New Zealand
23. North Korea
24. Nigeria
25. Panama
26. Qatar
27. Rwanda
28. Slovakia
29. Syria
30. Tanzania
31. Uruguay
32. Zambia
33. Zimbabwe

=== Resident in other cities ===
1. Andorra (Andorra la Vella)
2. Benin
3. Bhutan (Geneva)
4. Costa Rica (San José)
5. Lesotho (Dublin)
6. Malta (Valletta)
7. Montenegro (Podgorica)
8. San Marino (City of San Marino)
9. Singapore (Singapore)
10. Tajikistan (Vienna)

=== Unconfirmed ===
- Cape Verde (Berlin)
- Central African Republic (Brussels)
- Ivory Coast (Copenhagen)
- Nicaragua (Paris)
- Timor-Leste (Brussels)

== Closed missions ==
Host city	Sending country	Mission	Year closed	Ref.
Oslo	Burundi	Embassy	2018	
Oslo	Costa Rica	Embassy	2015	
Oslo	Guatemala	Embassy	2016	
Oslo	Venezuela	Embassy	2016	
Bergen	United States	Consulate	1953	
Narvik	Sweden	Consulate	1969	

== Mission to be open ==
=== Oslo ===
- Bangladesh - Embassy

== See also ==
- Foreign relations of Norway
- List of diplomatic missions of Norway
- Visa requirements for Norwegian citizens
