= Embassy of Denmark, Oslo =

Diplomatic mission

Royal Danish Embassy, Oslo Kongelig dansk ambassade, Oslo

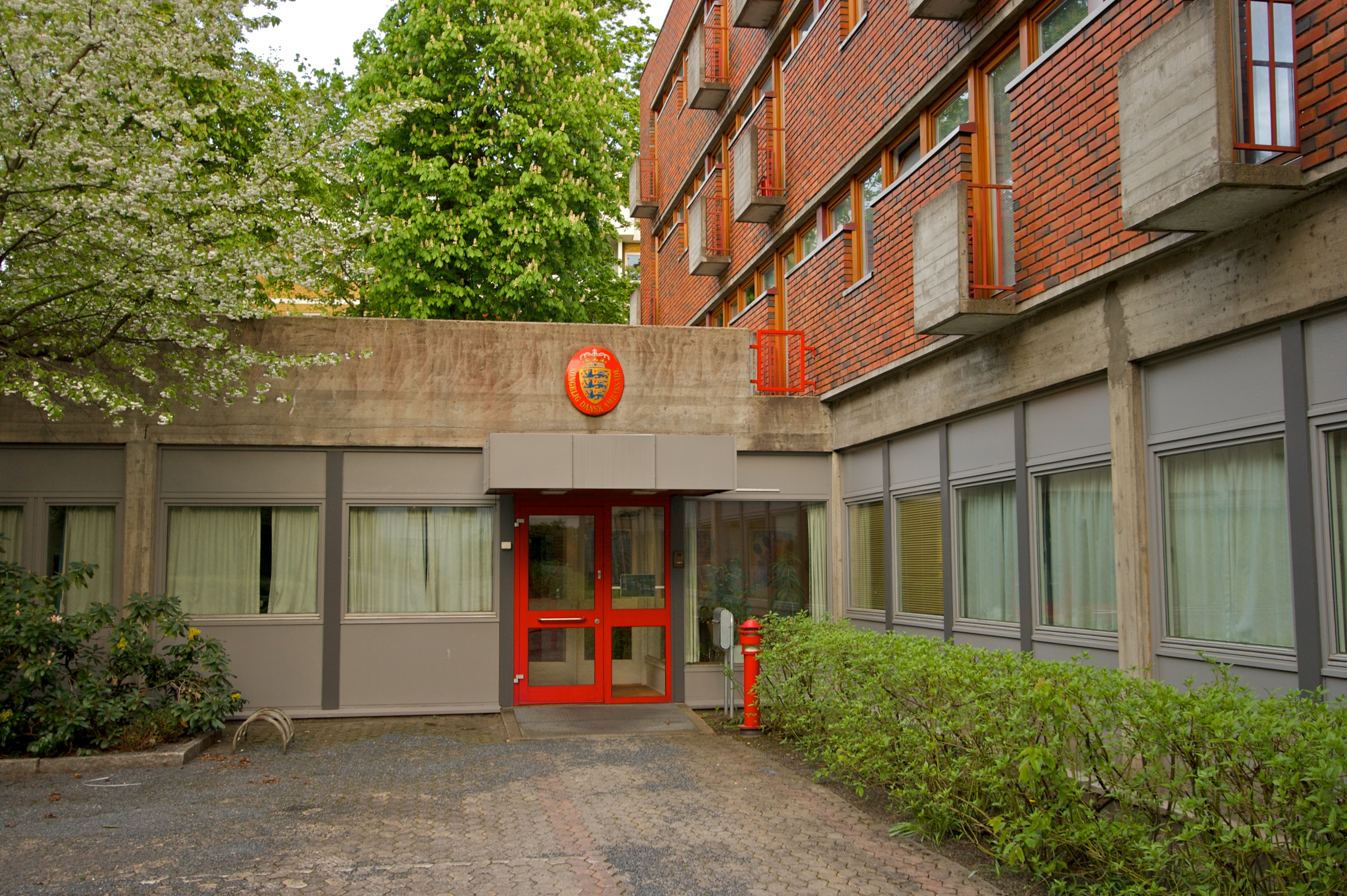
- Address: Olav Kyrres gate 7, 0273 Oslo
- Coordinates: 59.9180°N 10.6936°E

The Royal Danish Embassy (also Embassy of Denmark) is the Danish diplomatic mission to the Kingdom of Norway. As neighbouring countries, Denmark and Norway share a cultural and political history, and the embassy is a key element in maintaining the good relationship between the two countries.

The embassy is a part of the Ministry of Foreign Affairs of Denmark which overseas all official Danish representations abroad.

== History ==
The Denmark-Norway relations date back to the 14th century, but Denmark's first diplomatic mission to Norway was established after the fall of the Kalmar Union. After World War II the mission was upgraded to an embassy.

== The Trade Council ==
The Trade Council is an integrated trade organisation within the Ministry of Foreign Affairs of Denmark working to promote Danish export and investments abroad. The headquarters is in Copenhagen; however, around 3/4 of the staff are working from Danish embassies, consulates, and trade commissions worldwide.

== See also ==
- Diplomatic Missions to Norway
- Danish Diplomatic Missions
