= Danish Immigration Service =

Danish government directorate

The Danish Immigration Service (Danish: Udlændingestyrelsen or Udlændingeservice) is a government agency under Denmark's Ministry of Immigration and Integration. It handles applications for asylum, family reunification, short-stay visas and permanent residence, and is responsible for accommodating asylum seekers. The agency has offices in Næstved, Sandholm and Copenhagen.

There have been disagreements between the Danish Immigration Service and Minister for Integration Søren Pind over the requirements for family reunification for immigrants.

In October 2017 the Danish migration agency Udlændingestyrelsen rejected over 600 asylum applications because the applicants had lied about their national identity in order to achieve preferential treatment.

== History ==
The agency's predecessor was the Directorate for Aliens (Direktoratet for Udlændinge). Responsibility for immigration administration was transferred from the Ministry of Justice to the Ministry of the Interior in 1993. In 2001, the agency became part of the newly established Ministry of Refugees, Immigration and Integration Affairs. Following administrative irregularities that came to light in 2005-2006, it was reorganized and renamed Udlændingeservice. When the ministry was abolished in 2011, responsibility for asylum, family reunification and visas passed to the Ministry of Justice.

== Responsibilities ==
The service examines asylum applications, initially determining whether a claim should be considered in Denmark or another European Union country. For claims considered in Denmark, it decides whether the applicant qualifies for residence. It also processes applications for family reunification and permanent residence and participates in the processing of short-stay visa applications.

Residence permits relating to employment and study, and residence documents for EU/EEA citizens, are handled by the separate Danish Agency for International Recruitment and Integration (SIRI).

The Immigration Service is responsible for the accommodation and support of asylum seekers and certain other foreign nationals, including people on tolerated stay. Its responsibilities include securing accommodation facilities and making decisions about healthcare and other necessary support. The day-to-day operation of asylum centres is carried out by organisations working with the service.

== Country of origin information ==
The service's Centre for Documentation and Counter Extremism includes a country of origin information unit, which gathers information used in immigration and asylum cases. Its research draws on published material, interviews and fact-finding missions, covering subjects such as security, human rights and conditions for returnees. Staff involved in this work do not process applications or decide individual cases.
