= List of diplomatic missions of Denmark =

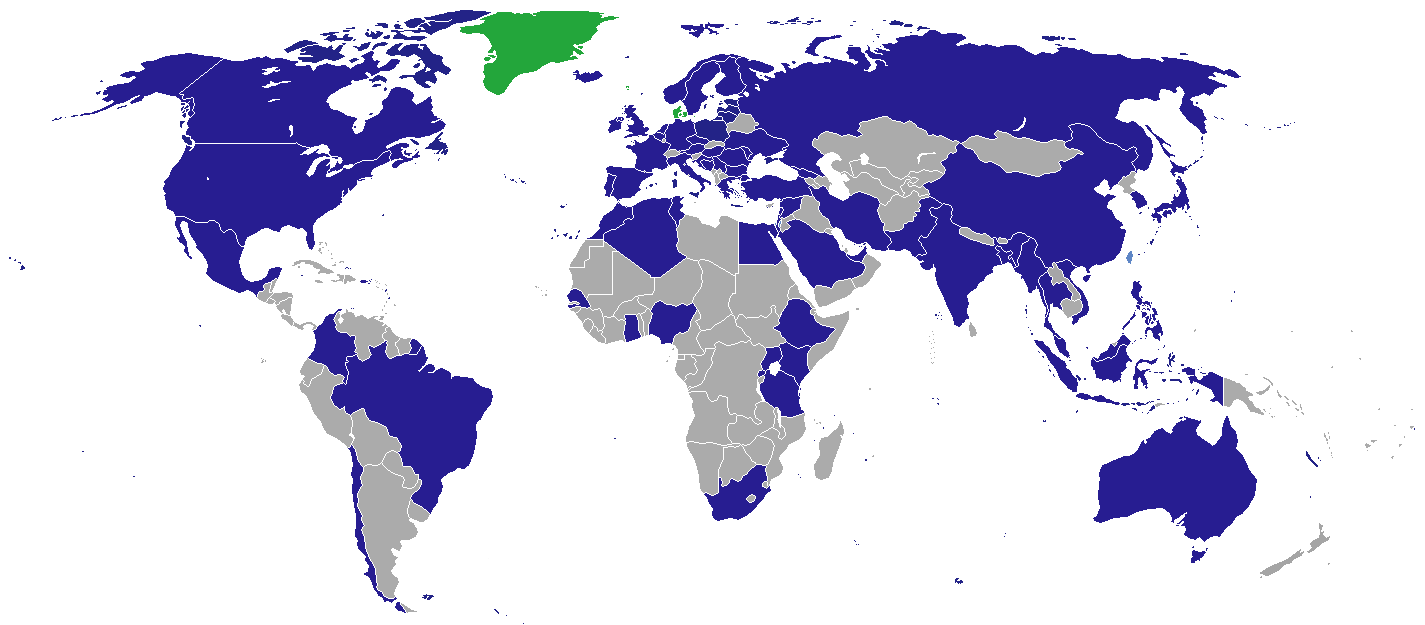
Countries with diplomatic missions from Denmark

This is a list of diplomatic missions of Denmark. The Kingdom of Denmark as a sovereign state consists of three countries incorporated in to the unity of the Realm (Denmark (proper), Greenland, Faroe Islands) and maintains 101 representations abroad.

In countries without Danish representation, Danish citizens can seek assistance from public officials in the foreign services of any of the other Nordic countries, in accordance with the Helsinki Treaty.

This listing omits honorary consulates and overseas offices of Innovation Centre Denmark and the Danish International Development Agency.

== Current missions ==
=== Africa ===
Host country	Host city	Mission	Concurrent accreditation	Ref.
Algeria	Algiers	Embassy		
Egypt	Cairo	Embassy		
Ethiopia	Addis Ababa	Embassy	Countries: Djibouti; South Sudan; Sudan; Multilateral Organizations: African Union; Intergovernmental Authority on Development; United Nations Economic Commission for Africa	
Ghana	Accra	Embassy	Countries: Guinea; Ivory Coast; Liberia; Sierra Leone; Togo	
Kenya	Nairobi	Embassy	Countries: Comoros; Eritrea; Malawi; Mauritius; Seychelles; Somalia; Multilateral Organizations: United Nations; United Nations Environment Programme; United Nations Human Settlements Programme	
Morocco	Rabat	Embassy	Countries: Mauritania	
Nigeria	Abuja	Embassy	Countries: Benin; Cameroon; Central African Republic; Congo-Brazzaville; Equatorial Guinea; Gabon	
Nigeria	Lagos	Consulate-General	Countries: Benin; Cameroon; Central African Republic; Congo-Brazzaville; Equatorial Guinea; Gabon	
Rwanda	Kigali	Embassy		
Senegal	Dakar	Embassy	Countries: Chad; Gambia; Mali; Niger	
South Africa	Pretoria	Embassy	Countries: Angola; Botswana; Eswatini; Lesotho; Mozambique; Namibia; Zambia; Zimbabwe; Multilateral Organizations: Southern African Development Community	
Tanzania	Dar es Salaam	Embassy		
Tunisia	Tunis	Embassy		
Uganda	Kampala	Embassy	Countries: Burundi; Congo-Kinshasa; Madagascar	

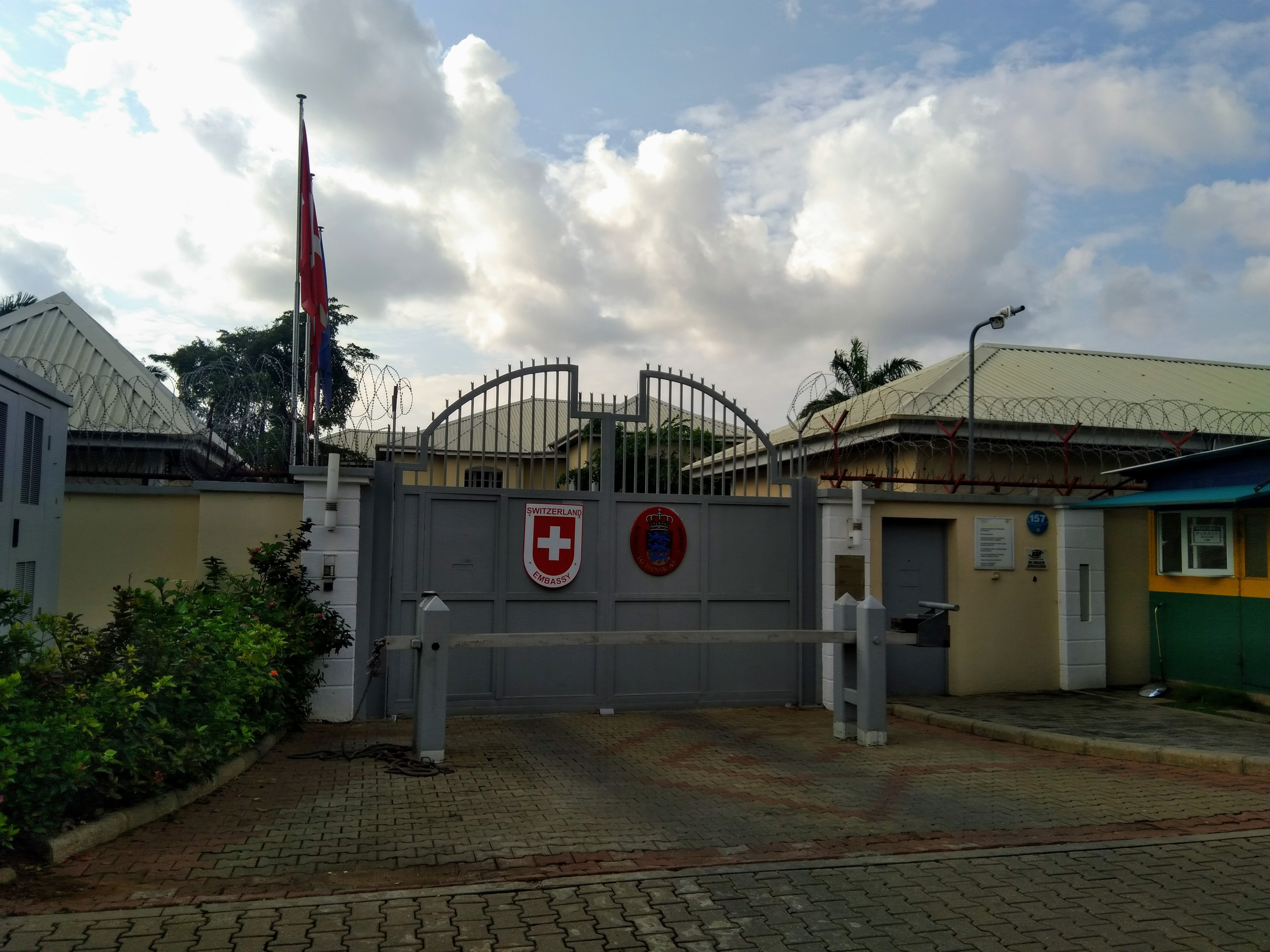
Embassy in Abuja

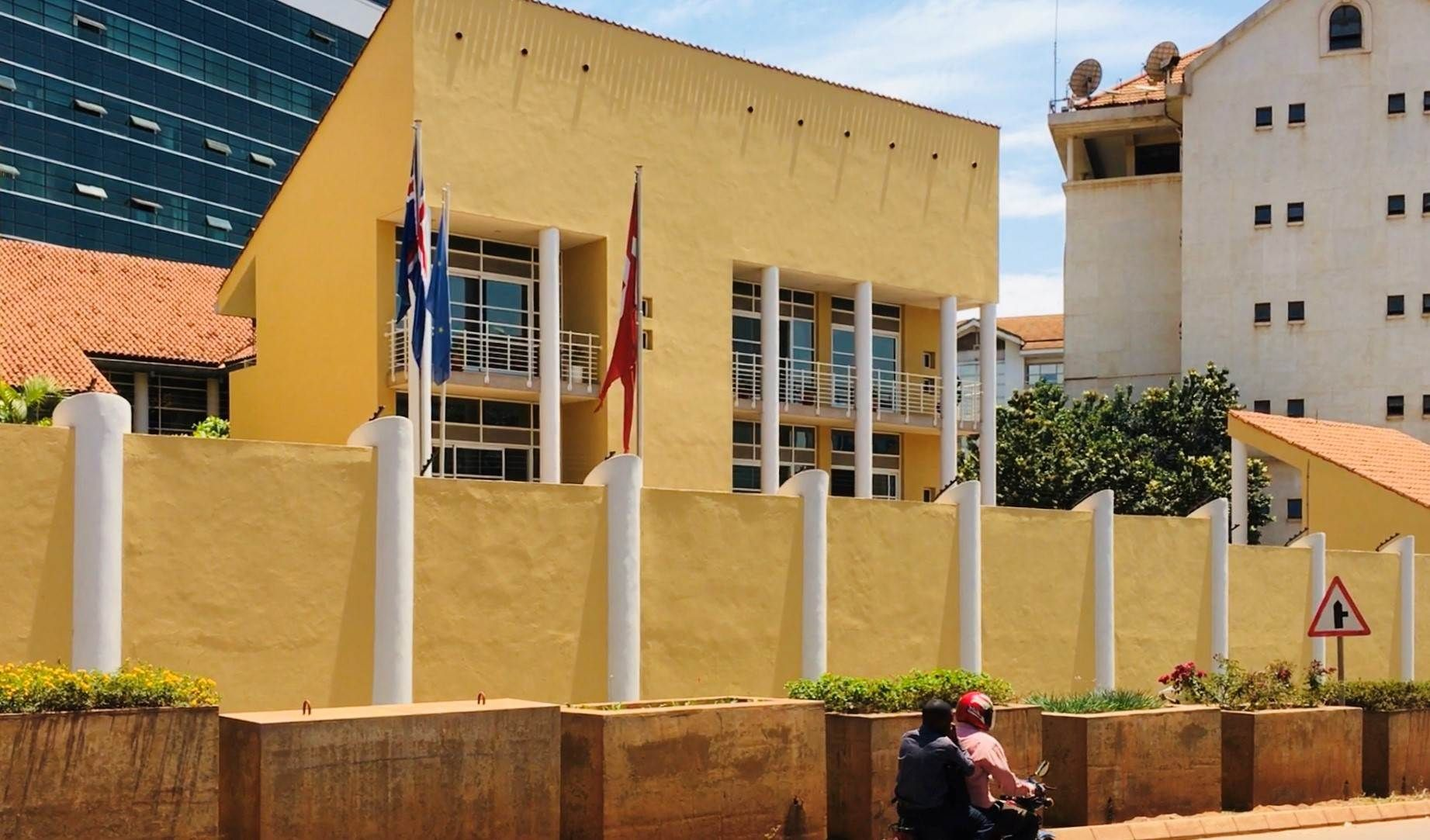
Embassy in Kampala

=== Americas ===
Host country	Host city	Mission	Concurrent accreditation	Ref.
Argentina	Buenos Aires	Embassy		
Brazil	Brasília	Embassy	Countries: Guyana; Paraguay; Suriname; Uruguay	
Brazil	São Paulo	Consulate-General	Countries: Guyana; Paraguay; Suriname; Uruguay	
Canada	Ottawa	Embassy		
Canada	Toronto	Consulate-General		
Chile	Santiago de Chile	Embassy	Countries: Ecuador; Peru	
Colombia	Bogotá	Embassy	Countries: Bolivia; Costa Rica; Panama; Venezuela	
Mexico	Mexico City	Embassy	Countries: Bahamas; Barbados; Belize; Cuba; Dominica; Dominican Republic; El Salvador; Grenada; Guatemala; Haiti; Honduras; Jamaica; Nicaragua; Saint Kitts and Nevis; Saint Lucia; Saint Vincent and the Grenadines; Trinidad & Tobago	
United States	Washington, D.C.	Embassy (Note: Attached with a representation of Greenland.)	Multilateral Organizations: Organization of American States (Note: Accredited as an observer mission.)	
United States	Chicago	Consulate-General	Multilateral Organizations: Organization of American States	
United States	Houston	Consulate-General	Multilateral Organizations: Organization of American States	
United States	New York City	Consulate-General	Multilateral Organizations: Organization of American States	
United States	Palo Alto	Consulate-General	Multilateral Organizations: Organization of American States	

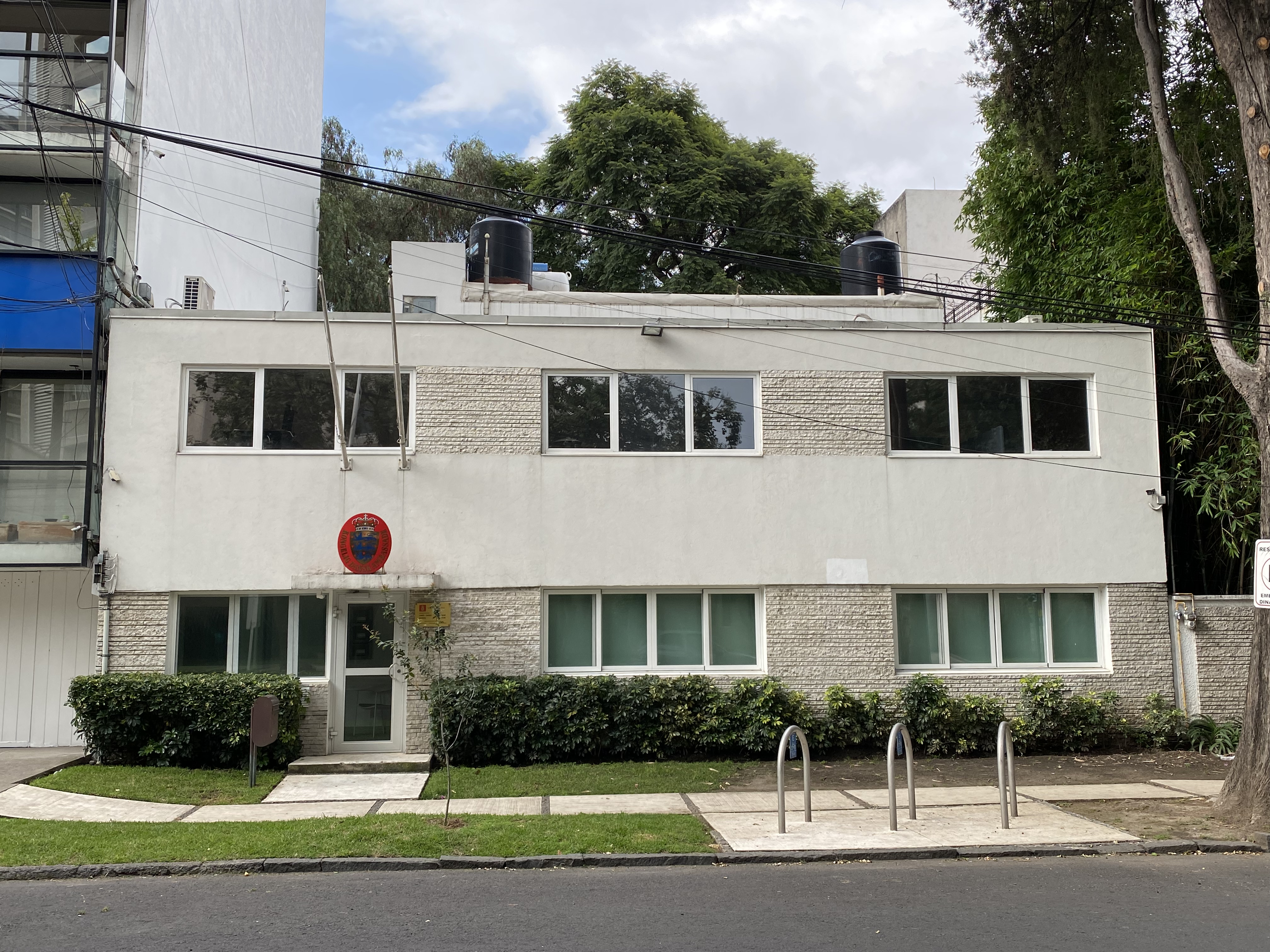
Embassy in Mexico City

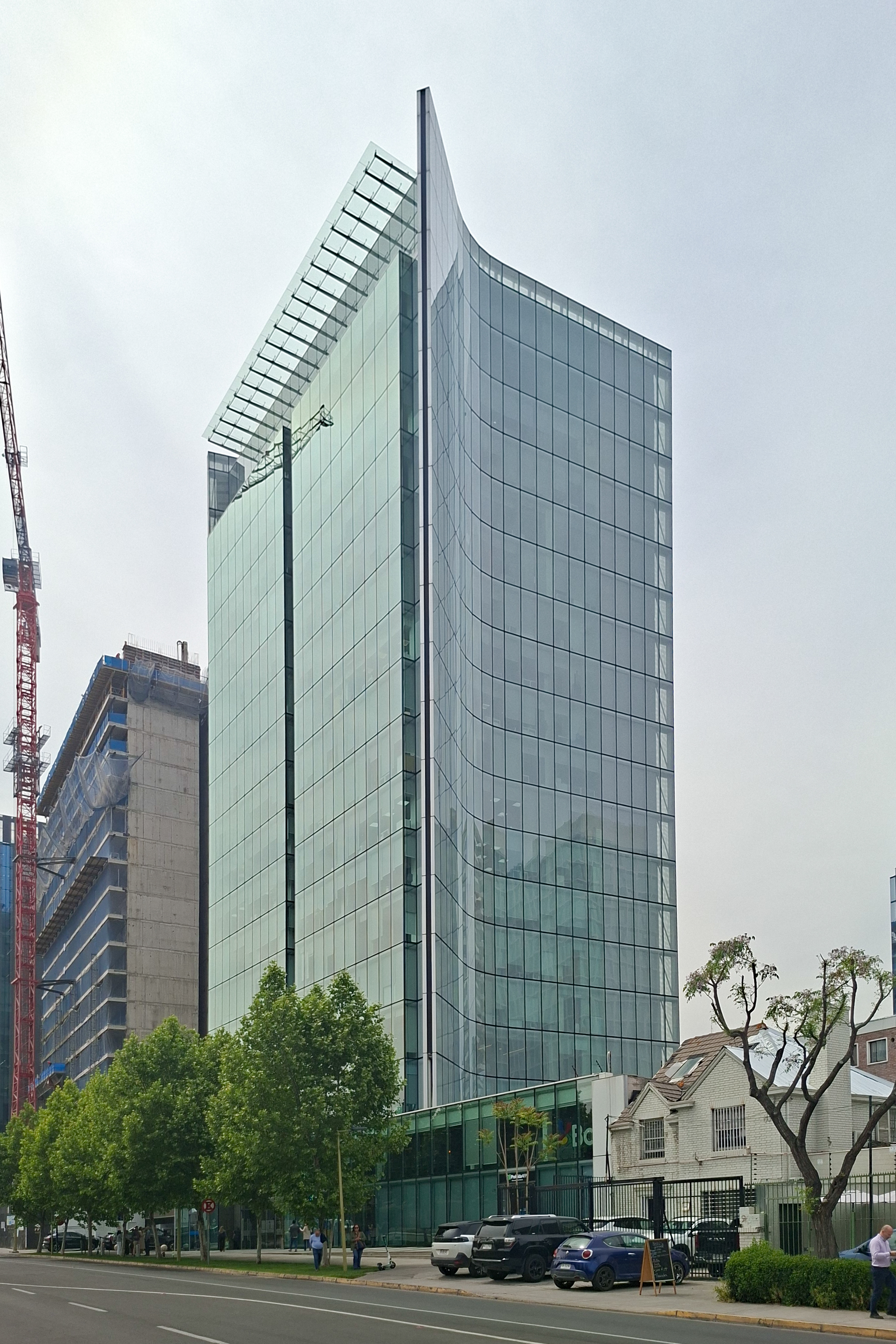
Building hosting the Embassy in Santiago

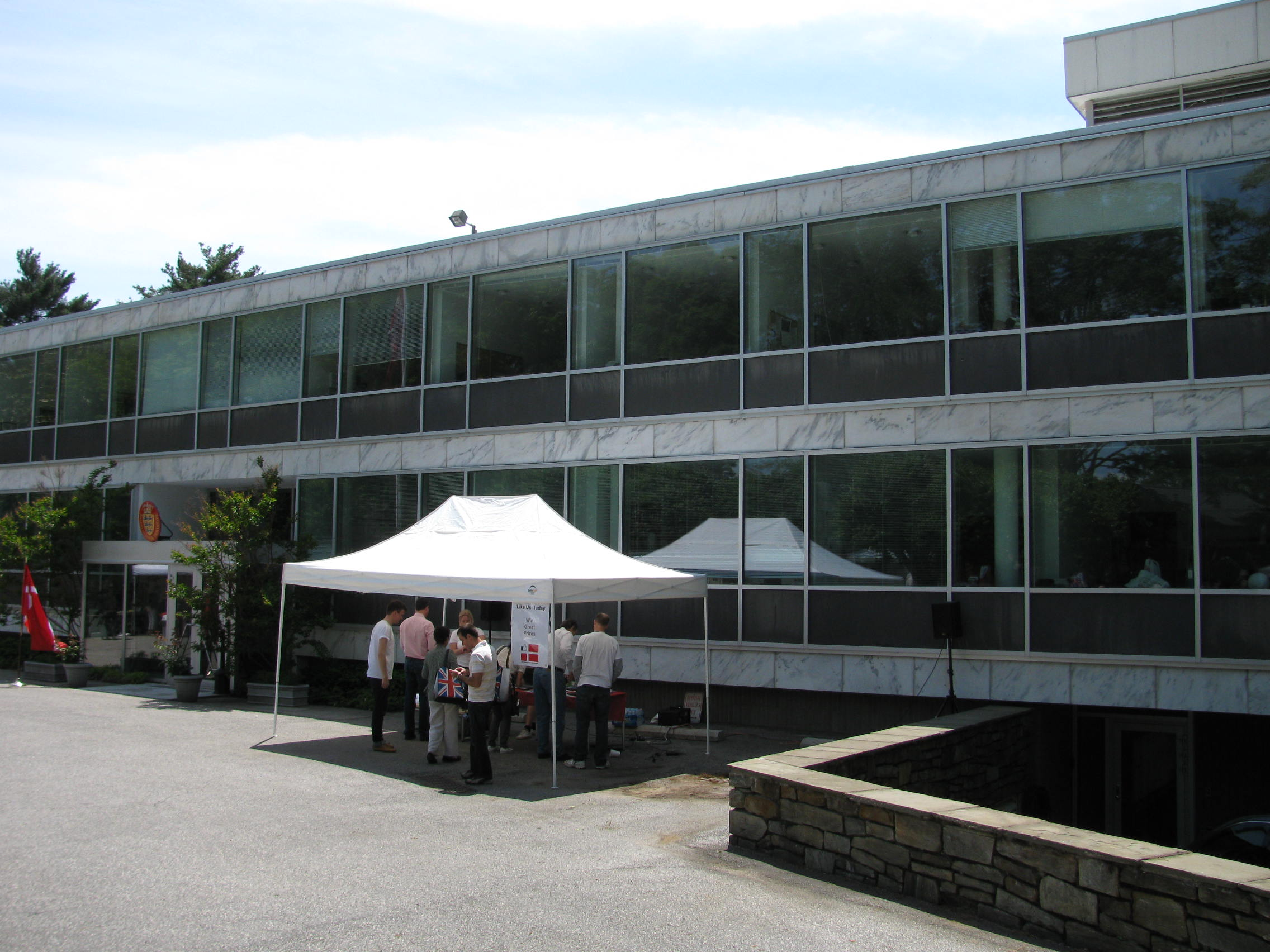
Embassy in Washington, D.C.

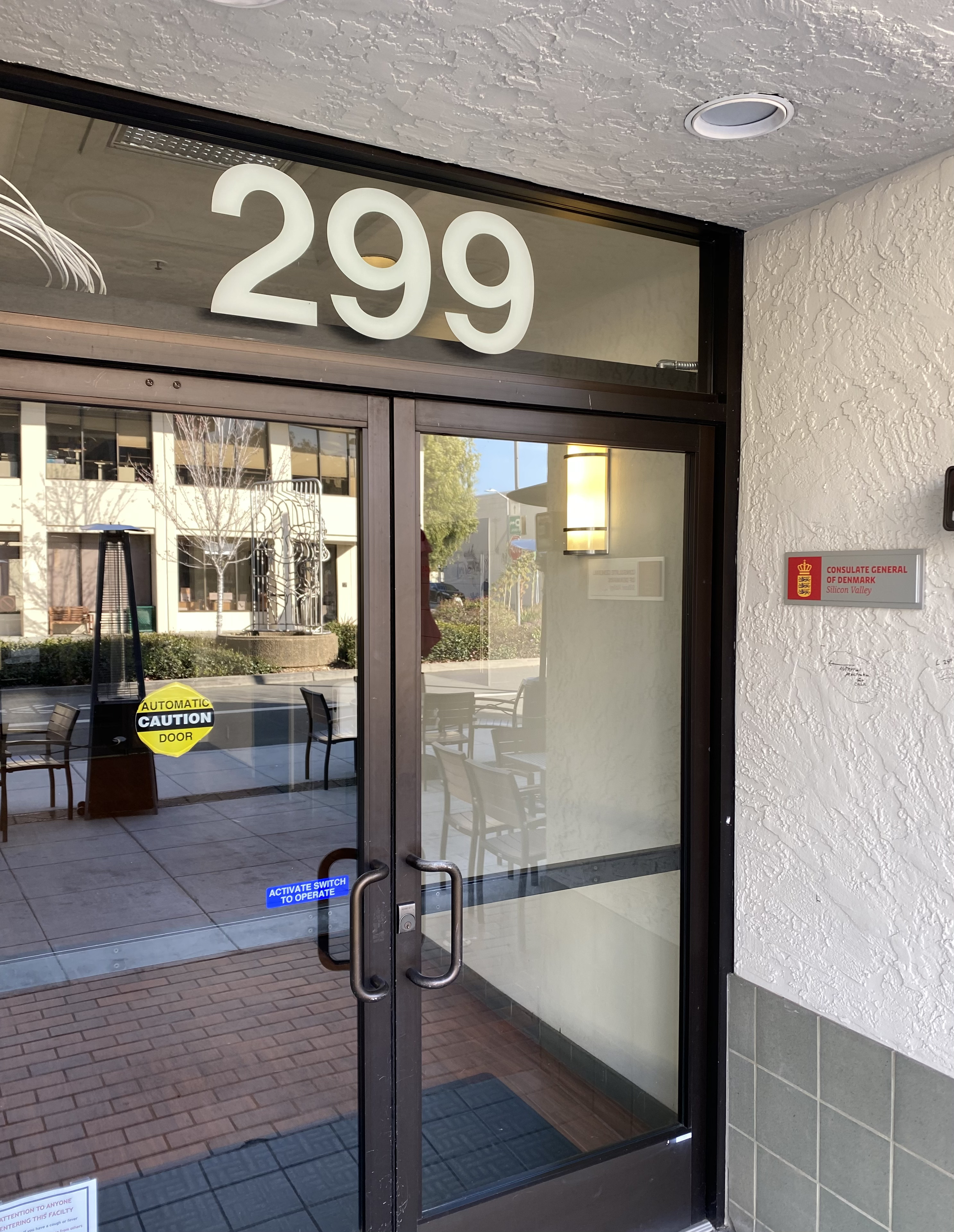
Consulate-General in Palo Alto

=== Asia ===
Host country	Host city	Mission	Concurrent accreditation	Ref.
Bangladesh	Dhaka	Embassy		
China	Beijing	Embassy (Note: Attached with a representation of the Faroe Islands.)	Countries: Mongolia	
China	Guangzhou	Consulate-General	Countries: Mongolia	
China	Shanghai	Consulate-General	Countries: Mongolia	
Georgia	Tbilisi	Embassy	Countries: Armenia	
India	New Delhi	Embassy	Countries: Bhutan; Maldives; Nepal; Sri Lanka	
India	Bengaluru	Consulate-General	Countries: Bhutan; Maldives; Nepal; Sri Lanka	
Indonesia	Jakarta	Embassy	Countries: Papua New Guinea; Timor-Leste; Multilateral Organizations: ASEAN	
Iran	Tehran	Embassy		
Israel	Tel Aviv	Embassy		
Japan	Tokyo	Embassy		
Lebanon	Beirut	Embassy	Countries: Jordan	
Malaysia	Kuala Lumpur	Embassy		
Myanmar	Yangon	Embassy (Note: Slated for closure in 2026.)		
Pakistan	Islamabad	Embassy		
Palestine	Ramallah	Representative office		
Philippines	Manila	Embassy	Countries: Palau	
Republic of China (Taiwan)	Taipei	Trade council		
Saudi Arabia	Riyadh	Embassy	Countries: Bahrain; Kuwait; Oman; Yemen	
Singapore	Singapore	Embassy	Countries: Brunei; Kiribati; Marshall Islands; Micronesia; Papua New Guinea	
South Korea	Seoul	Embassy		
Syria	Damascus	Embassy		
Thailand	Bangkok	Embassy	Countries: Cambodia	
Turkey	Ankara	Embassy	Countries: Azerbaijan	
Turkey	Istanbul	Consulate-General	Countries: Azerbaijan	
United Arab Emirates	Abu Dhabi	Embassy	Countries: Qatar	
United Arab Emirates	Dubai	Consulate-General	Countries: Qatar	
Vietnam	Hanoi	Embassy	Countries: Laos	

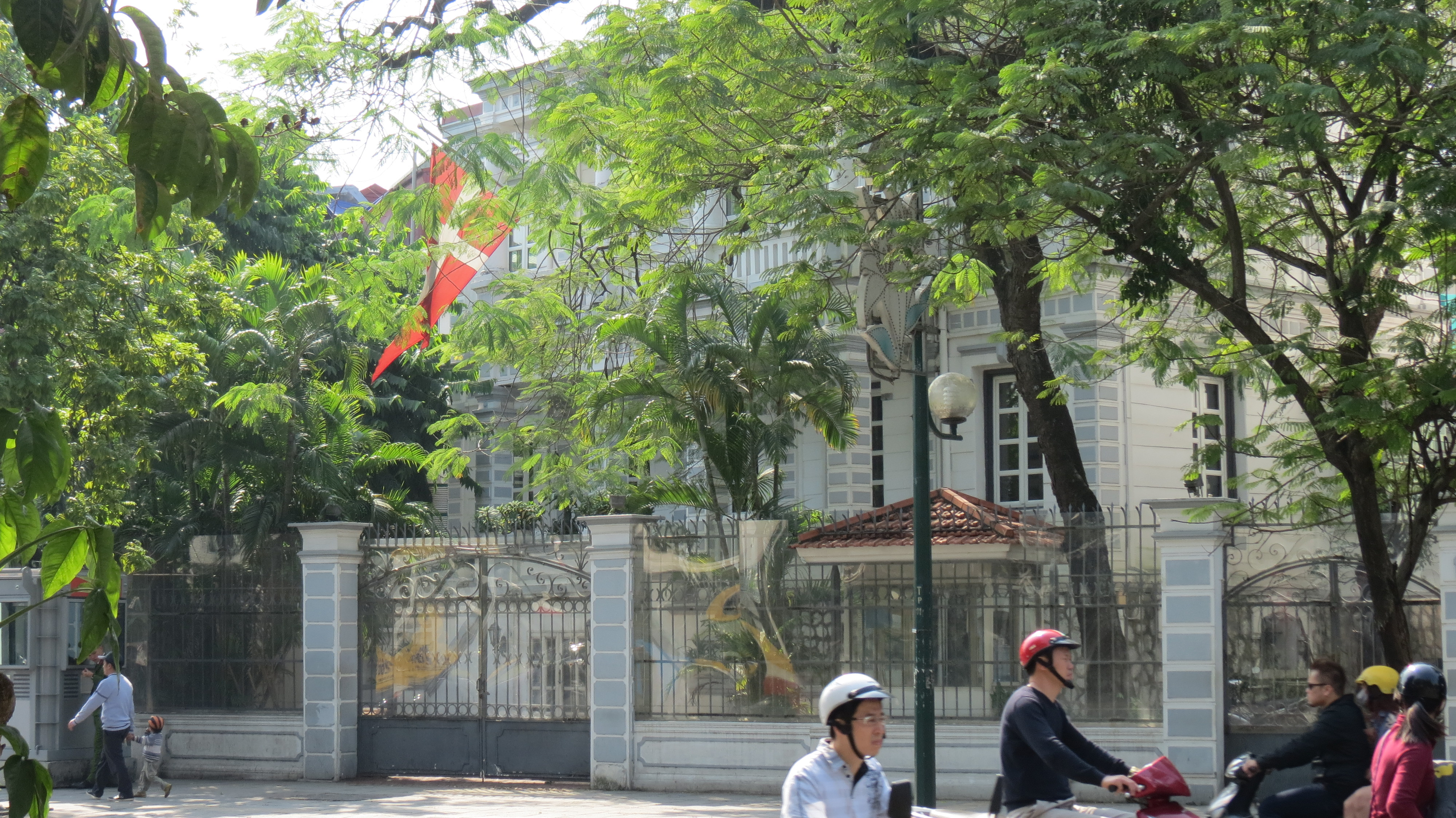
Embassy in Hanoi

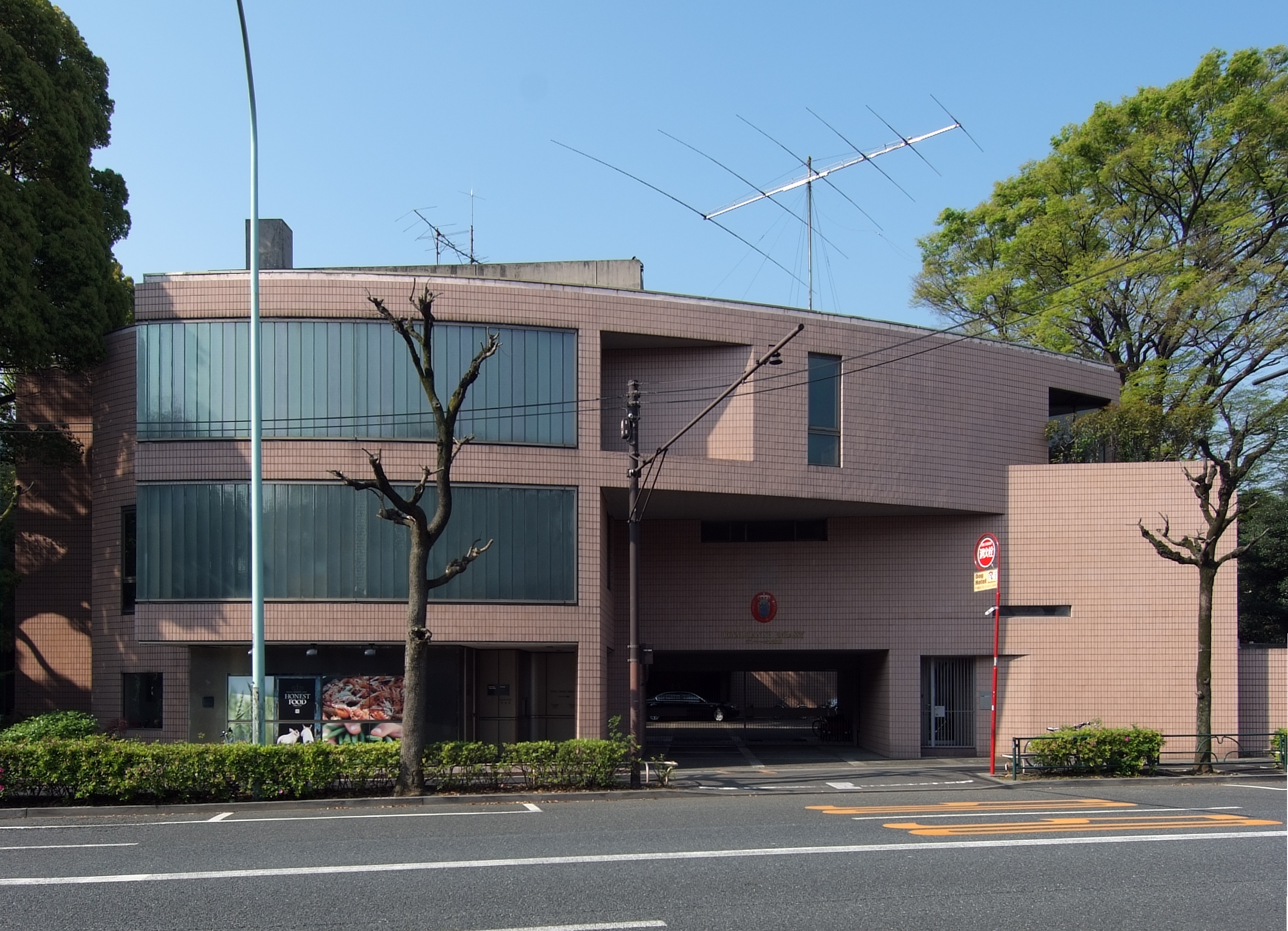
Embassy in Tokyo

=== Europe ===
Host country	Host city	Mission	Concurrent accreditation	Ref.
Albania	Tirana	Embassy		
Austria	Vienna	Embassy	Countries: Kosovo; Slovakia; Multilateral Organizations: OSCE; United Nations; International Atomic Energy Agency; CTBTO Preparatory Commission; UNIDO; UNODC	
Belgium	Brussels	Embassy	Countries: Holy See; Luxembourg	
Bosnia and Herzegovina	Sarajevo	Embassy		
Bulgaria	Sofia	Embassy		
Croatia	Zagreb	Embassy		
Czechia	Prague	Embassy		
Estonia	Tallinn	Embassy		
Finland	Helsinki	Embassy		
France	Paris	Embassy	Countries: Monaco	
Germany	Berlin	Embassy	Countries: Liechtenstein; Switzerland	
Germany	Flensburg	Consulate-General	Countries: Liechtenstein; Switzerland	
Germany	Hamburg	Consulate-General	Countries: Liechtenstein; Switzerland	
Germany	Munich	Consulate-General	Countries: Liechtenstein; Switzerland	
Greece	Athens	Embassy	Countries: Cyprus	
Hungary	Budapest	Embassy	Countries: Slovenia	
Iceland	Reykjavík	Embassy		
Ireland	Dublin	Embassy		
Italy	Rome	Embassy	Countries: Malta; San Marino; Multilateral Organizations: Food and Agriculture Organization; International Fund for Agricultural Development; World Food Programme	
Latvia	Riga	Embassy		
Lithuania	Vilnius	Embassy		
Moldova	Chișinău	Embassy		
Netherlands	The Hague	Embassy	Multilateral Organizations: International Criminal Court; International Court of Justice; Organisation for the Prohibition of Chemical Weapons	
Norway	Oslo	Embassy		
Poland	Warsaw	Embassy		
Portugal	Lisbon	Embassy	Countries: Cape Verde; Guinea-Bissau; São Tomé and Principe	
Romania	Bucharest	Embassy		
Russia	Moscow	Embassy	Countries: Belarus; Kazakhstan; Kyrgyzstan; Tajikistan; Turkmenistan; Uzbekistan	
Serbia	Belgrade	Embassy	Countries: Montenegro; North Macedonia	
Spain	Madrid	Embassy	Countries: Andorra	
Sweden	Stockholm	Embassy		
Ukraine	Kyiv	Embassy		
Ukraine	Mykolaiv	Embassy office		
United Kingdom	London	Embassy		

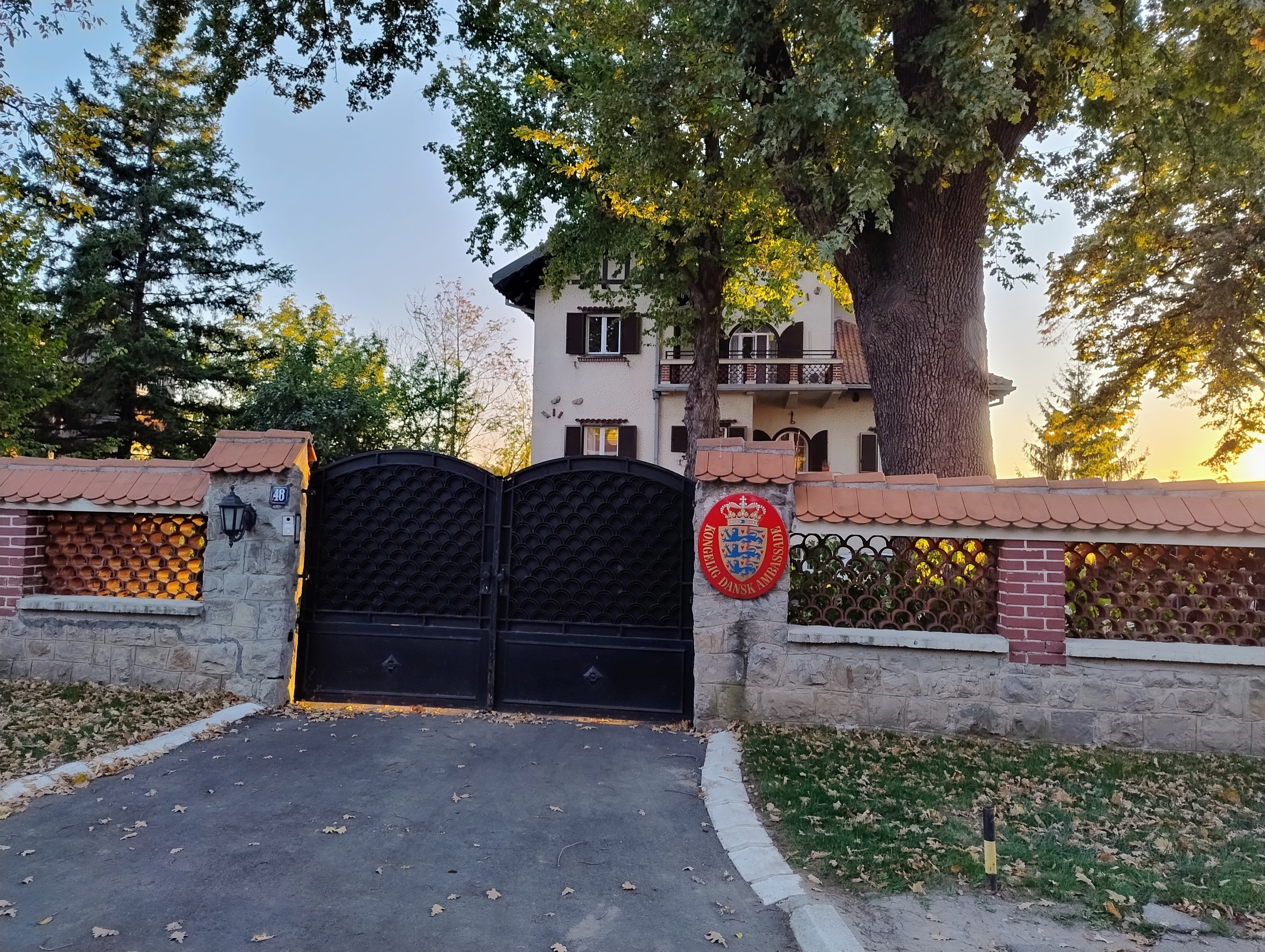
Embassy in Belgrade

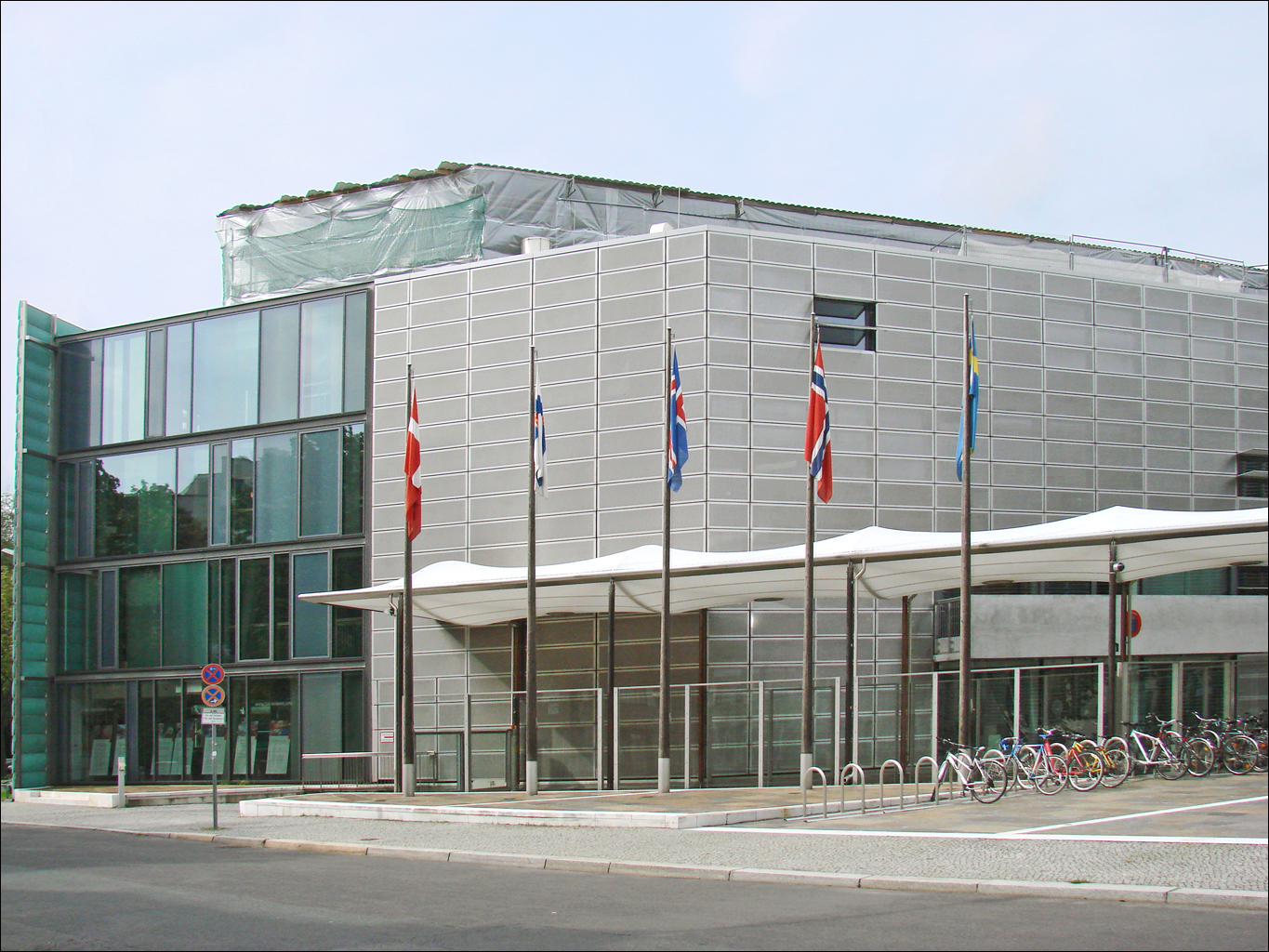
Embassy in Berlin

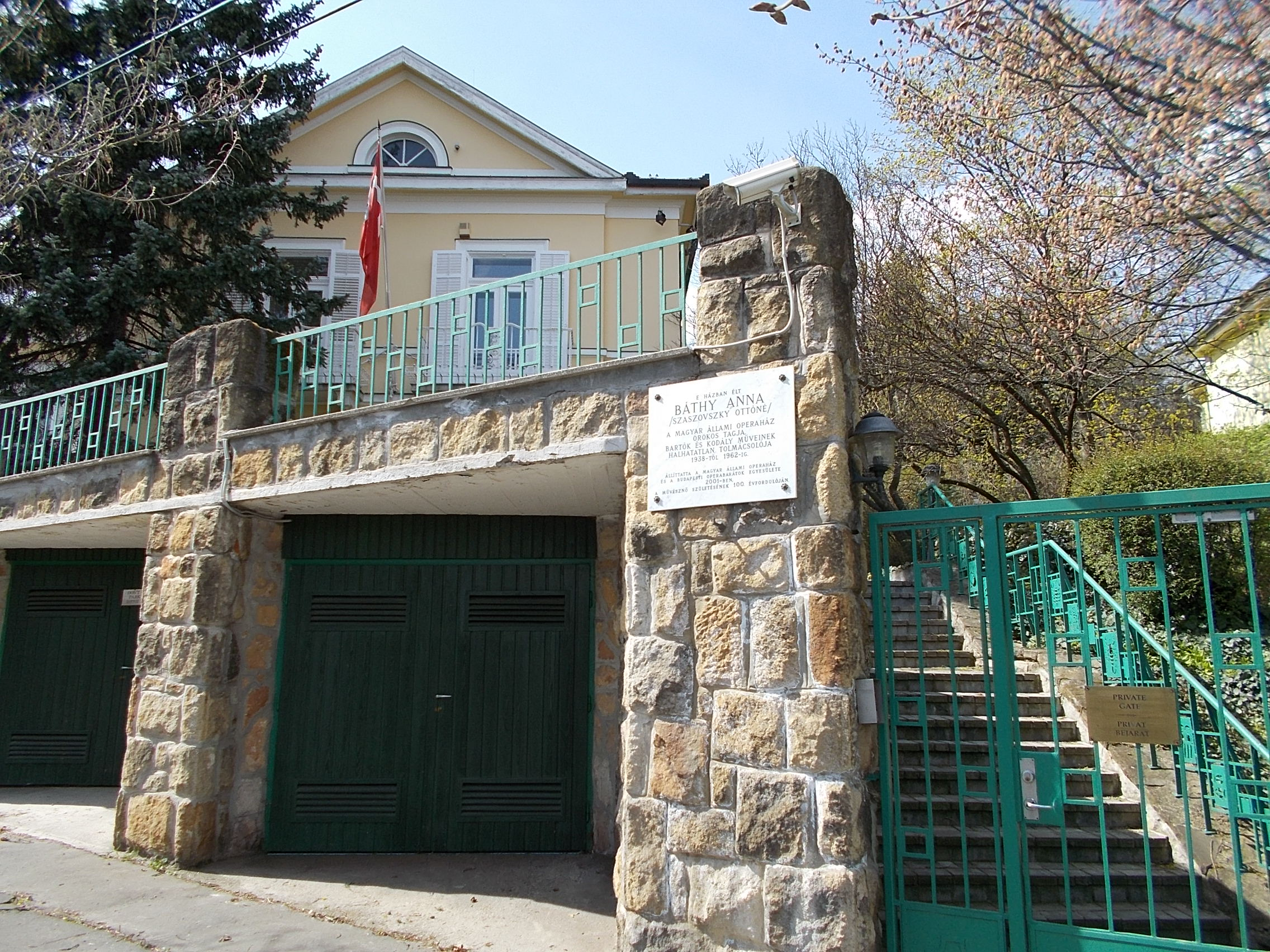
Embassy in Budapest

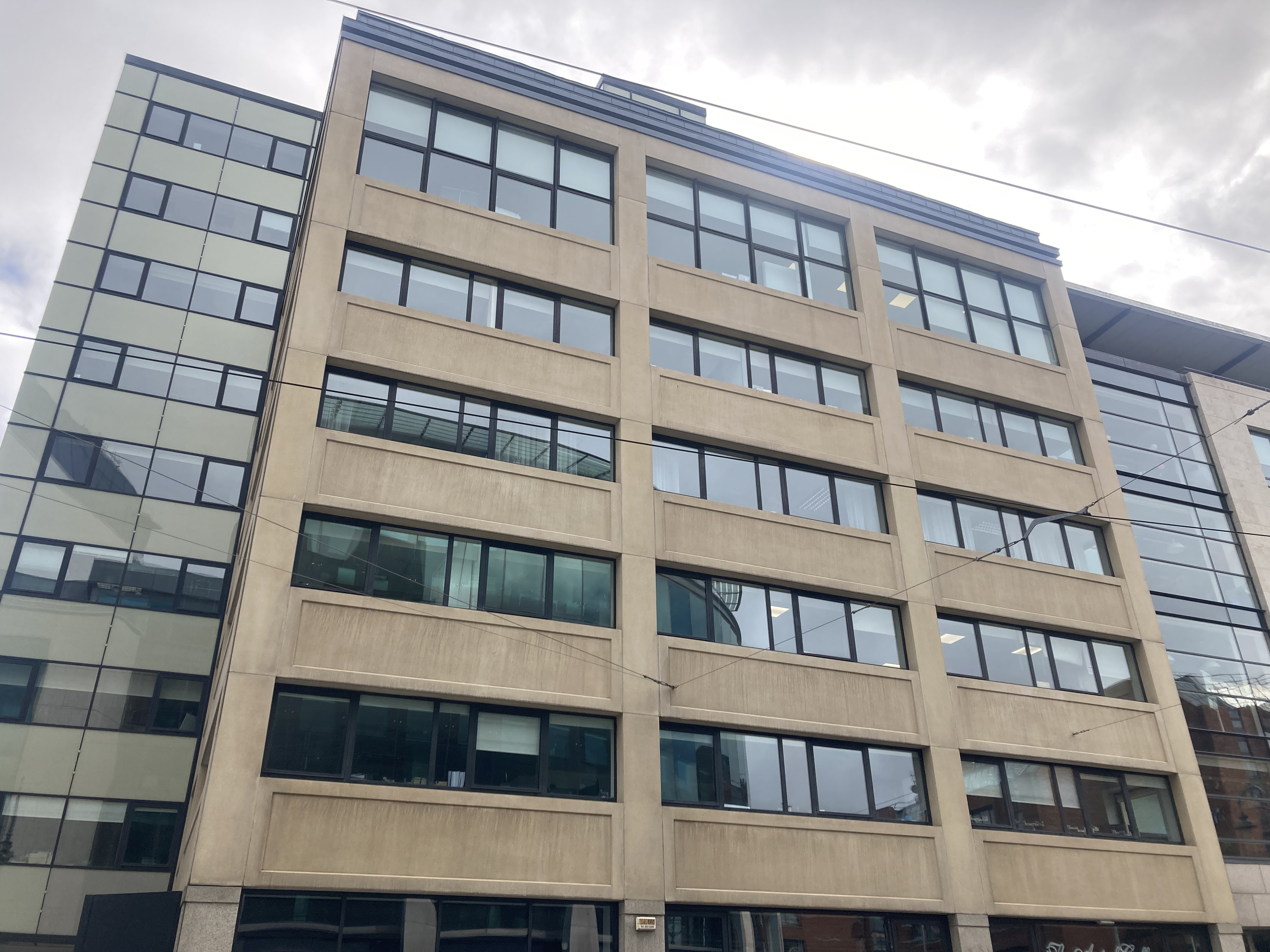
Embassy in Dublin

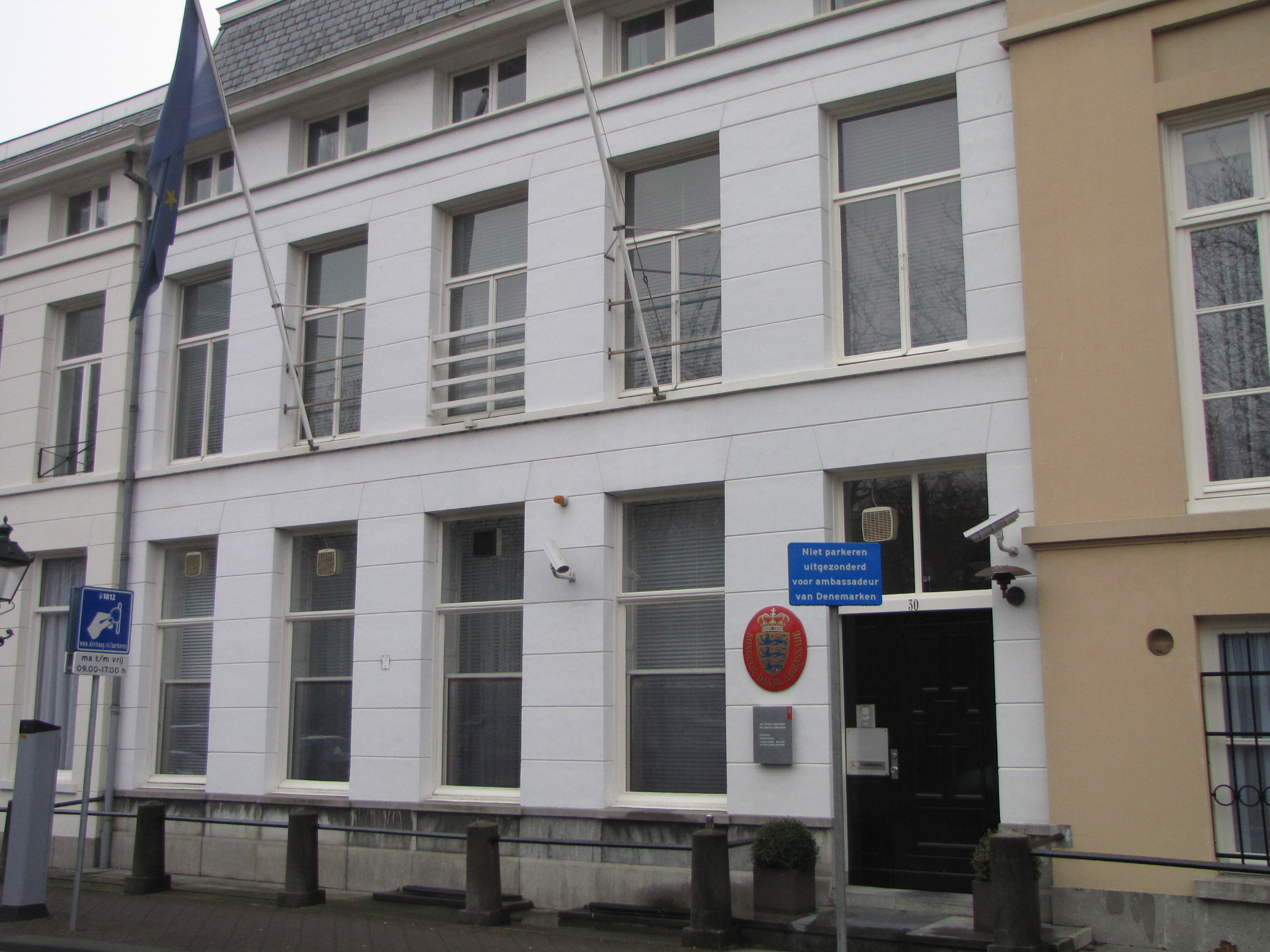
Embassy in The Hague

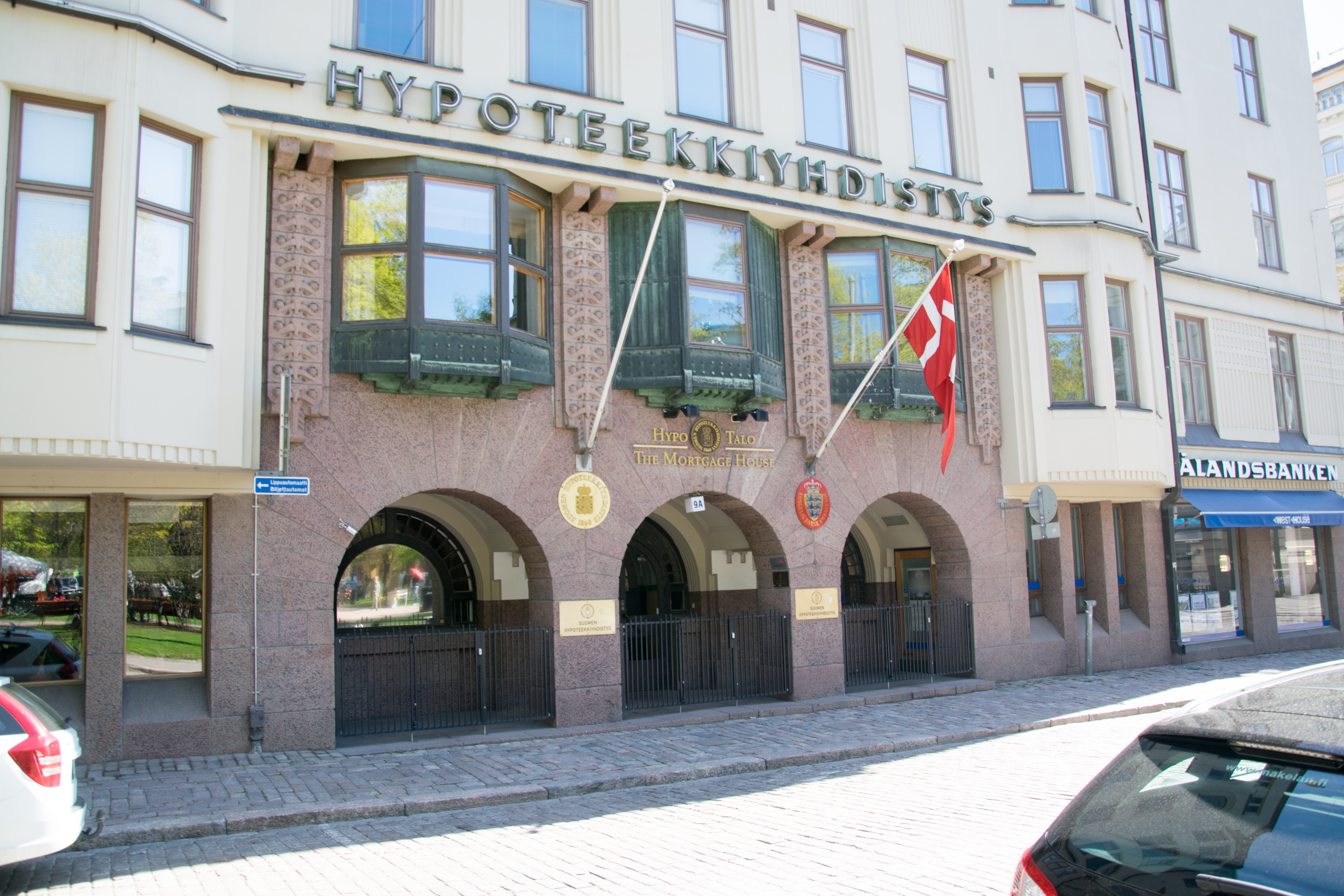
Embassy in Helsinki

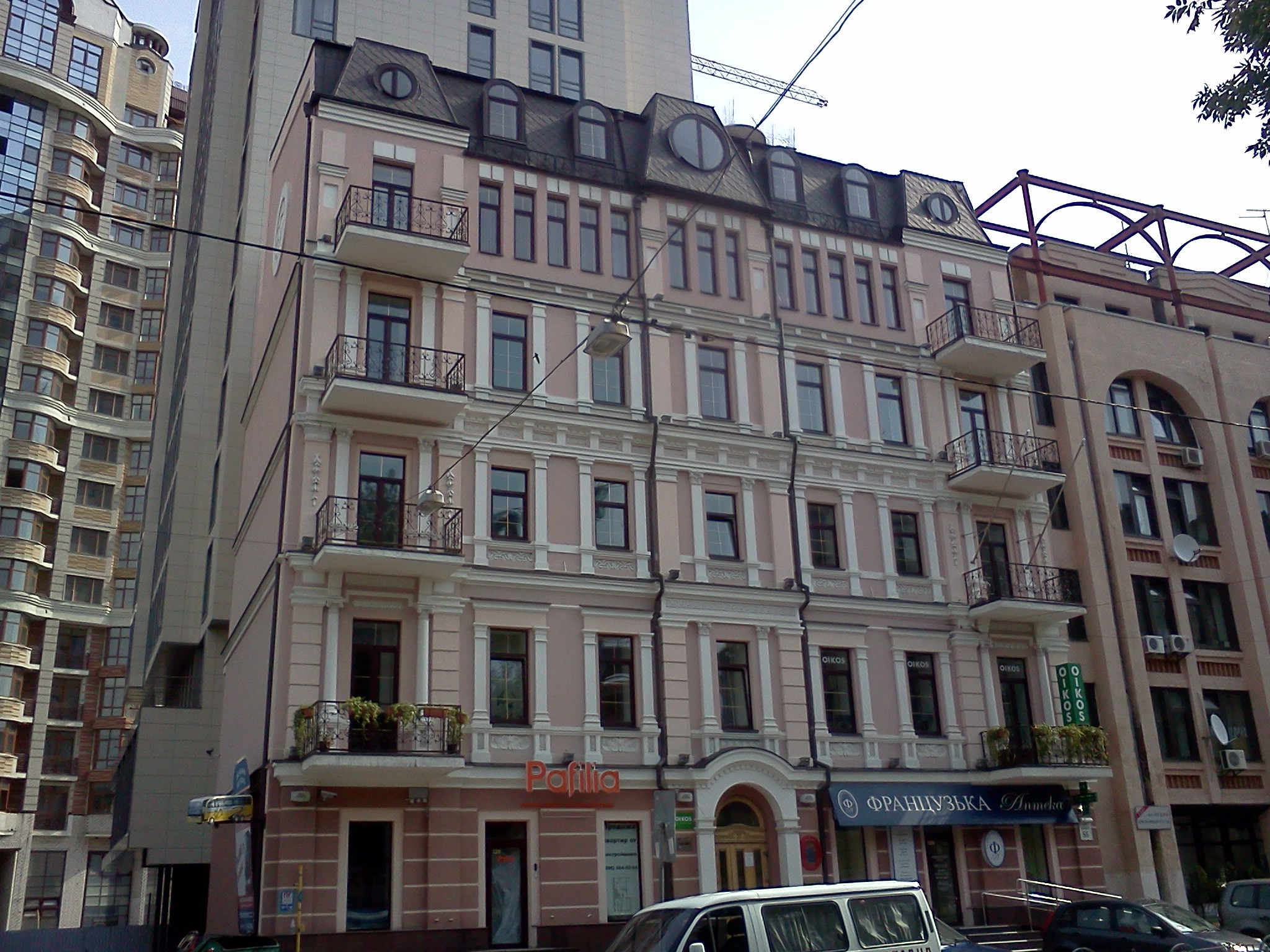
Embassy in Kyiv

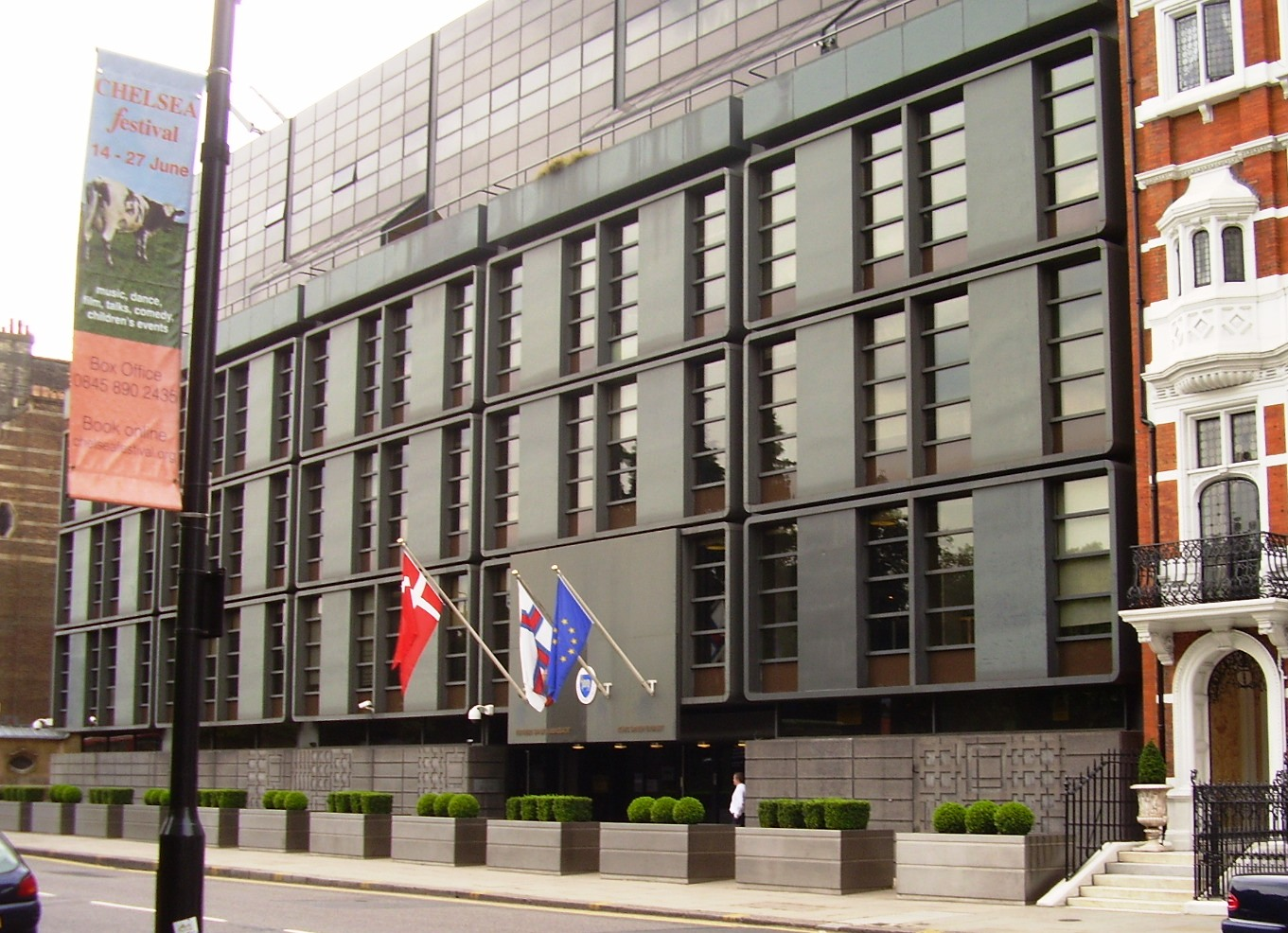
Embassy in London

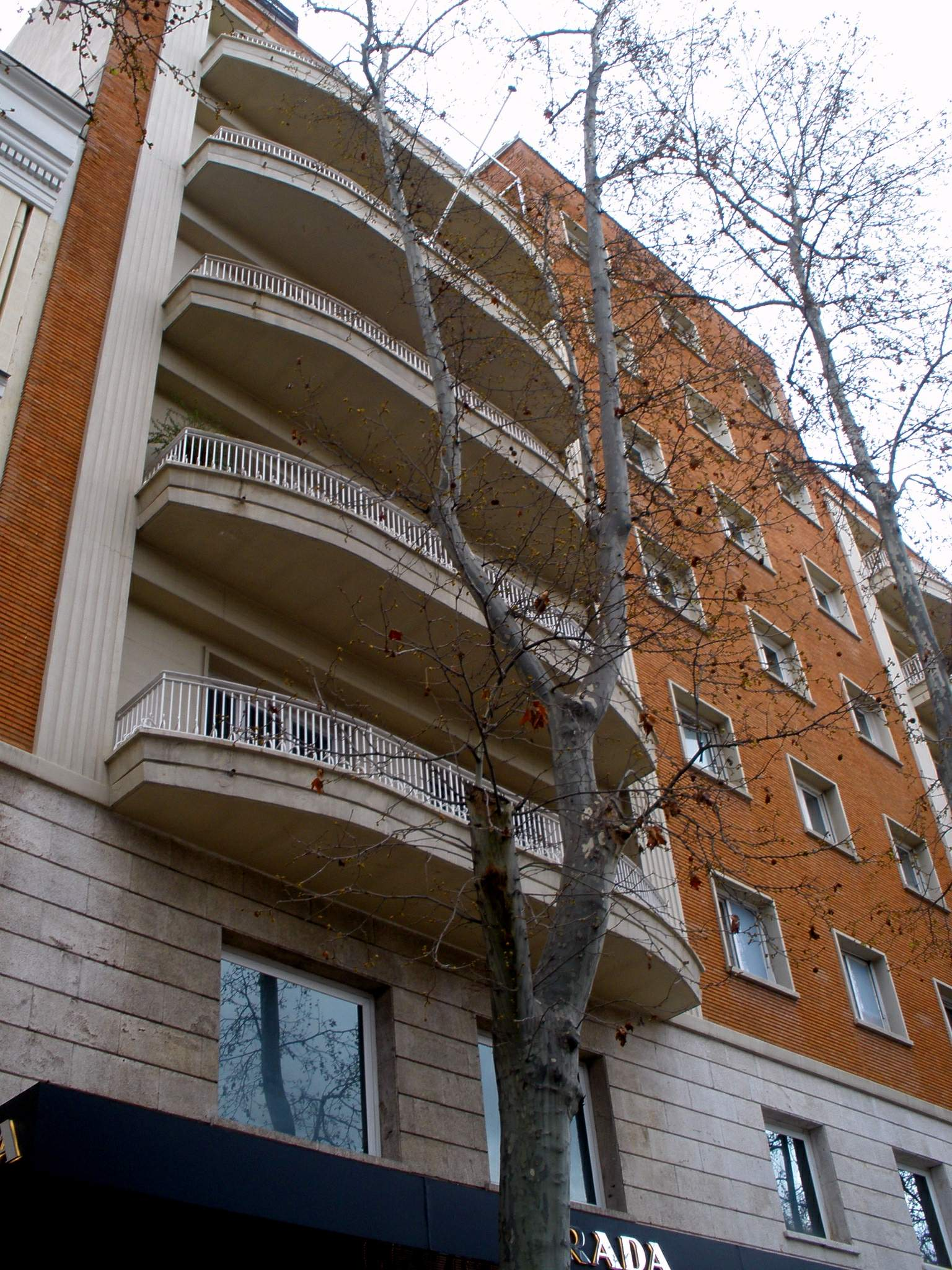
Embassy in Madrid

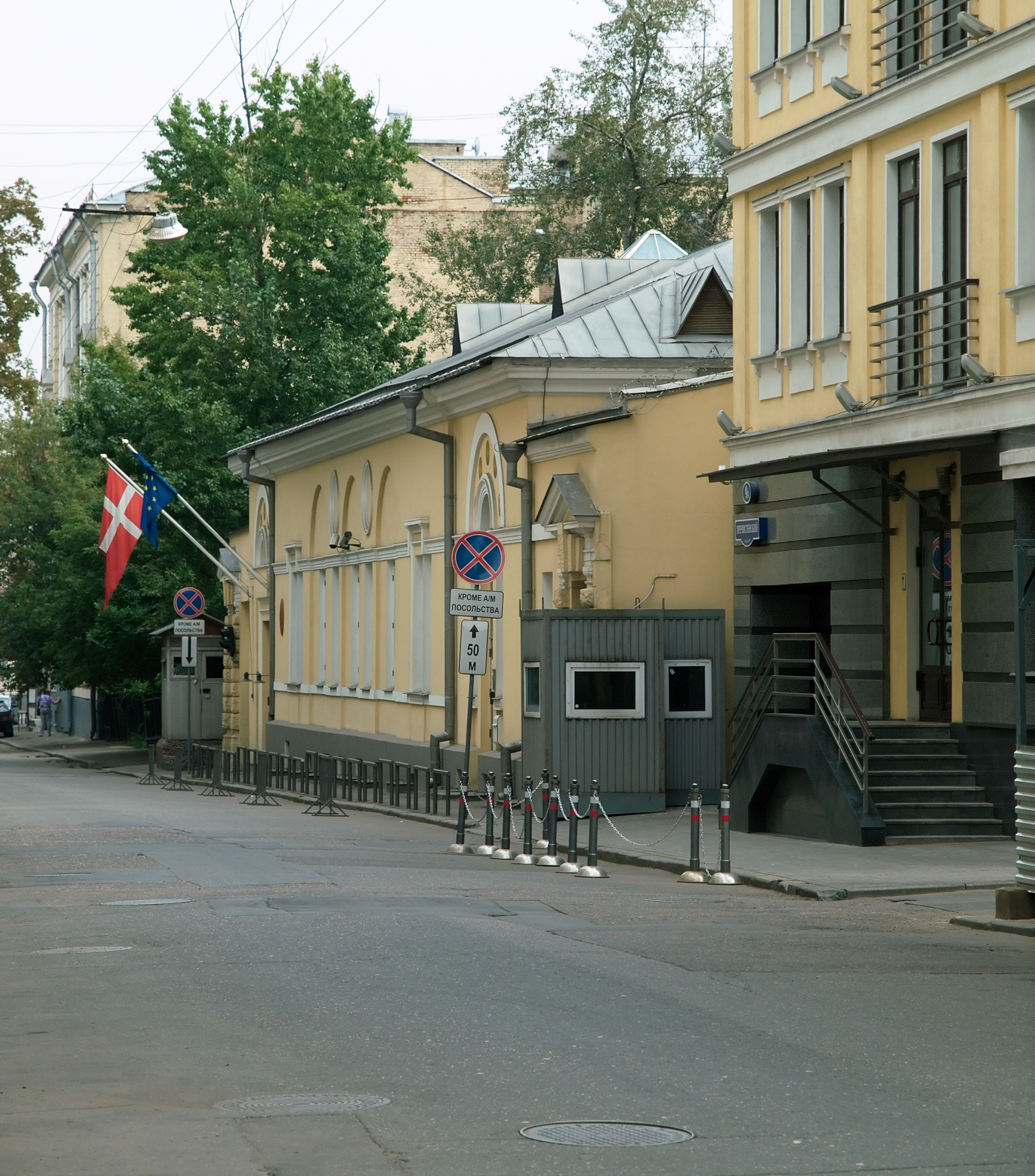
Embassy in Moscow

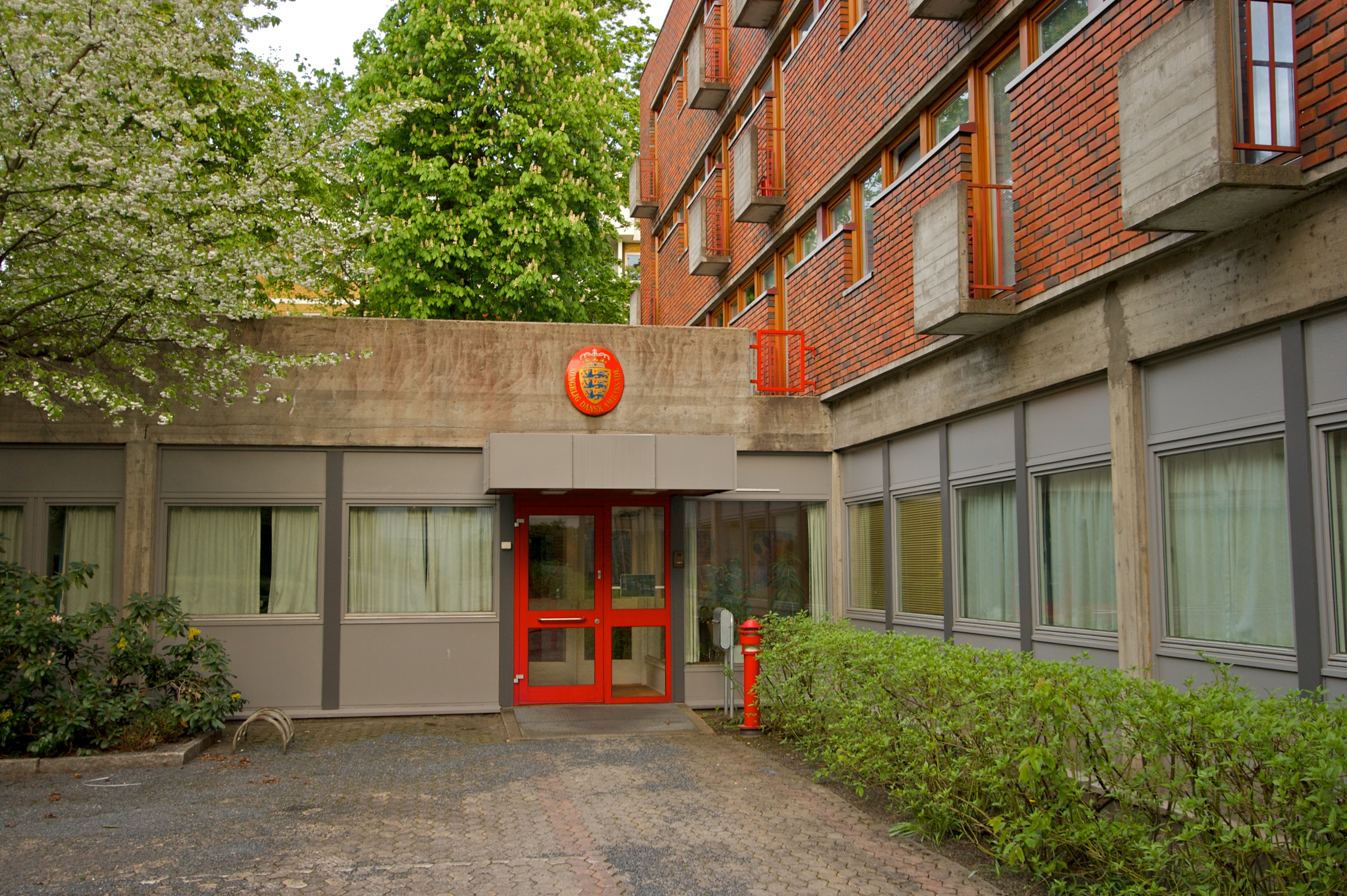
Embassy in Oslo

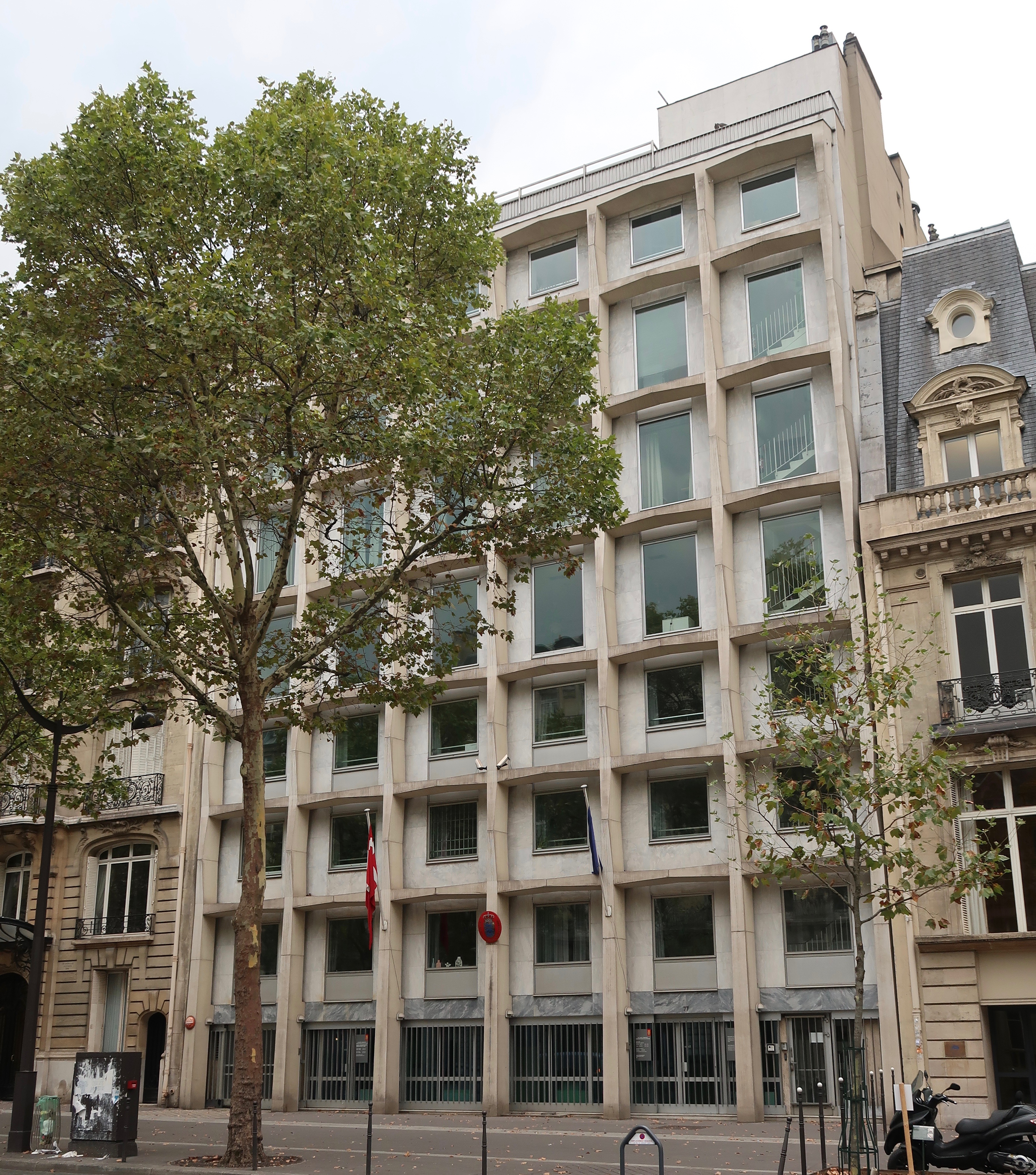
Embassy in Paris

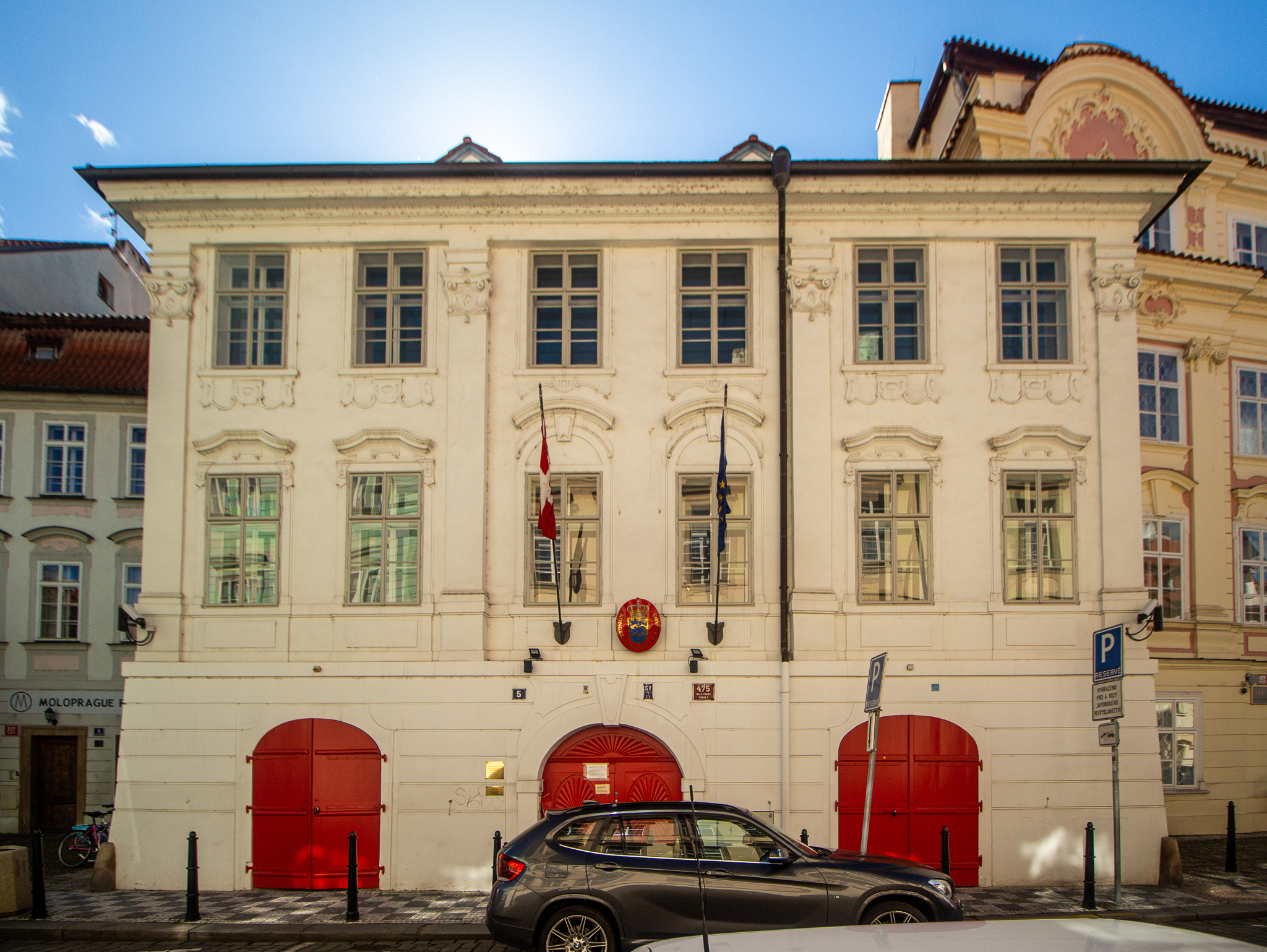
Embassy in Prague

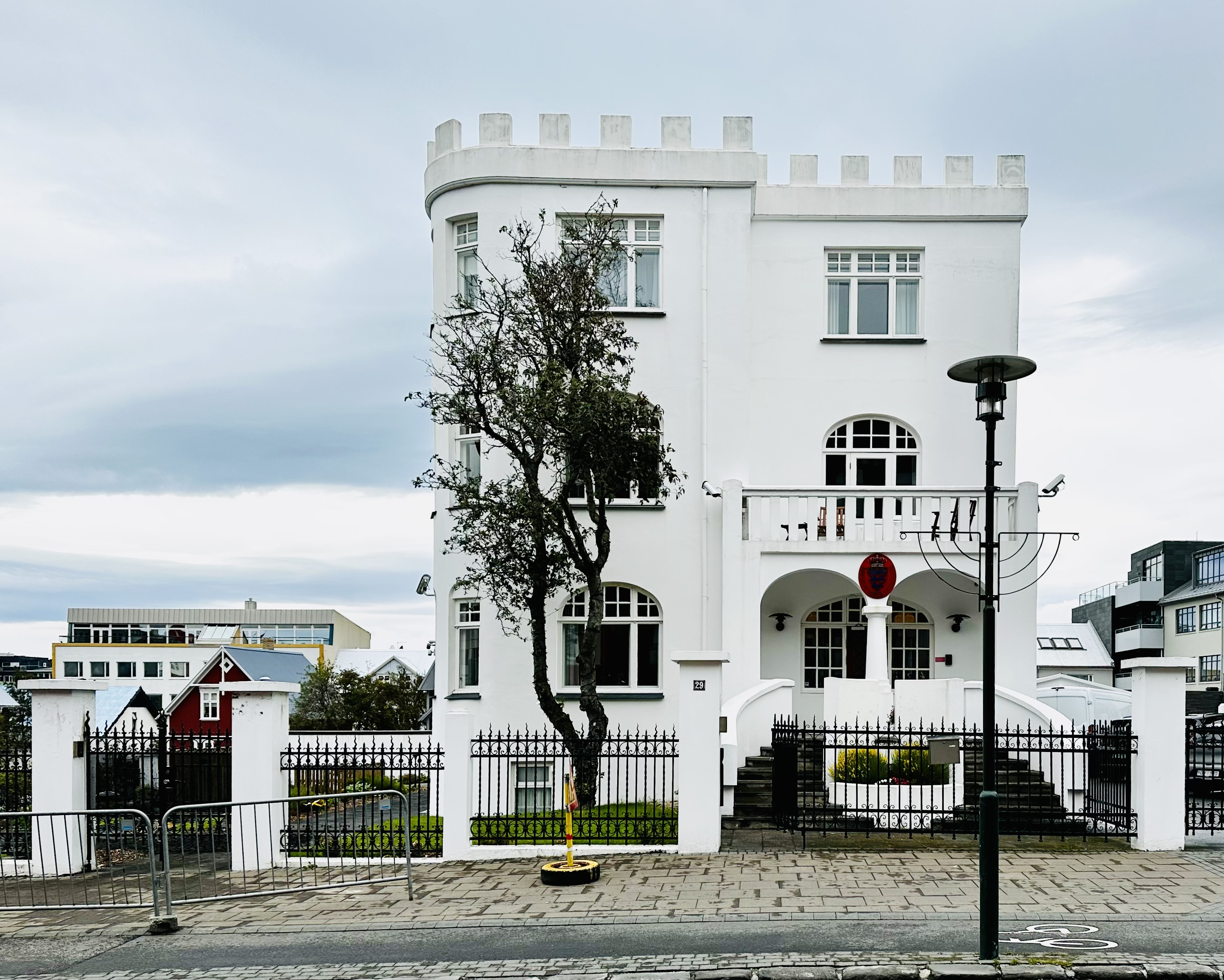
Embassy in Reykjavík

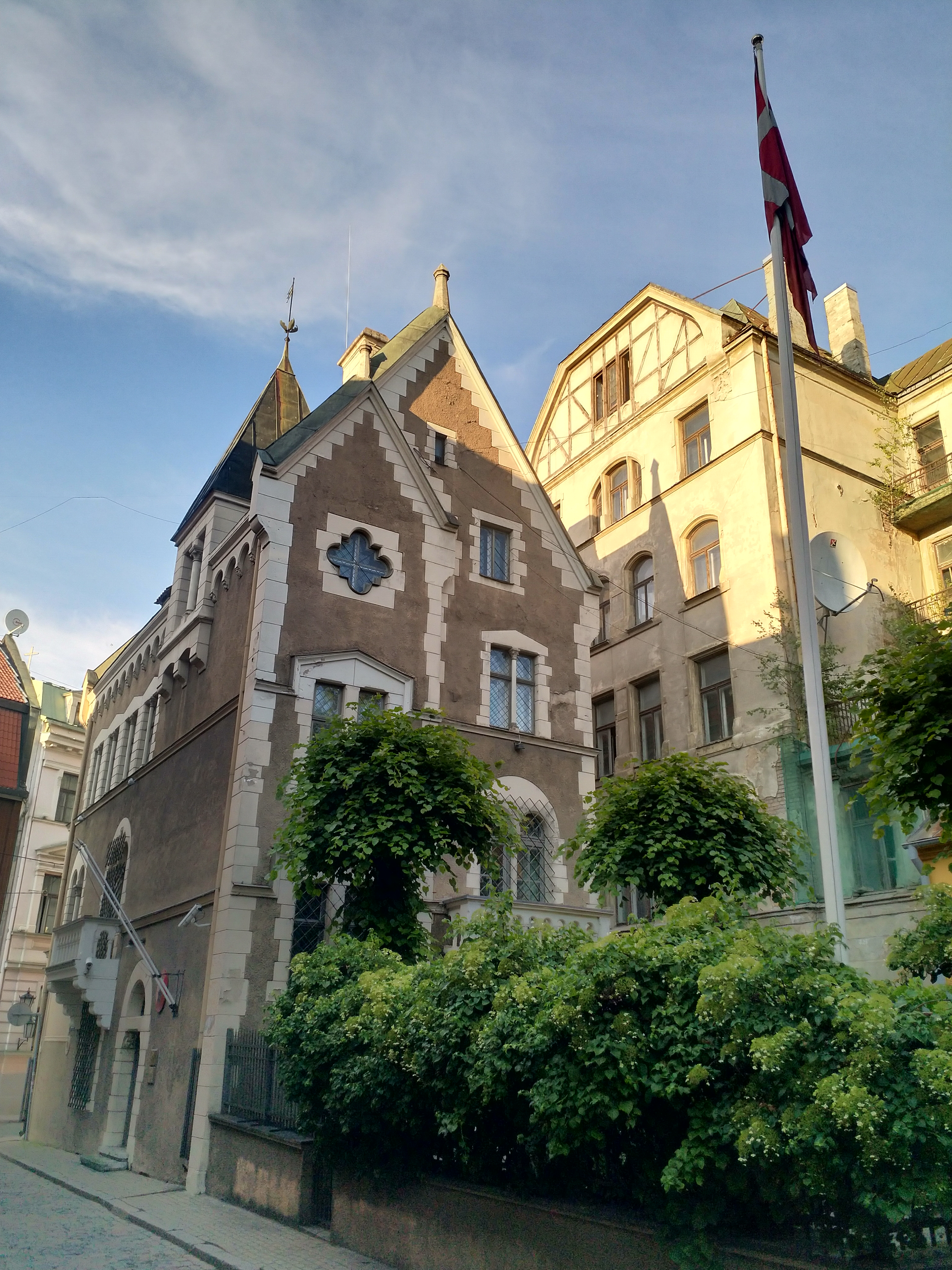
Embassy in Riga

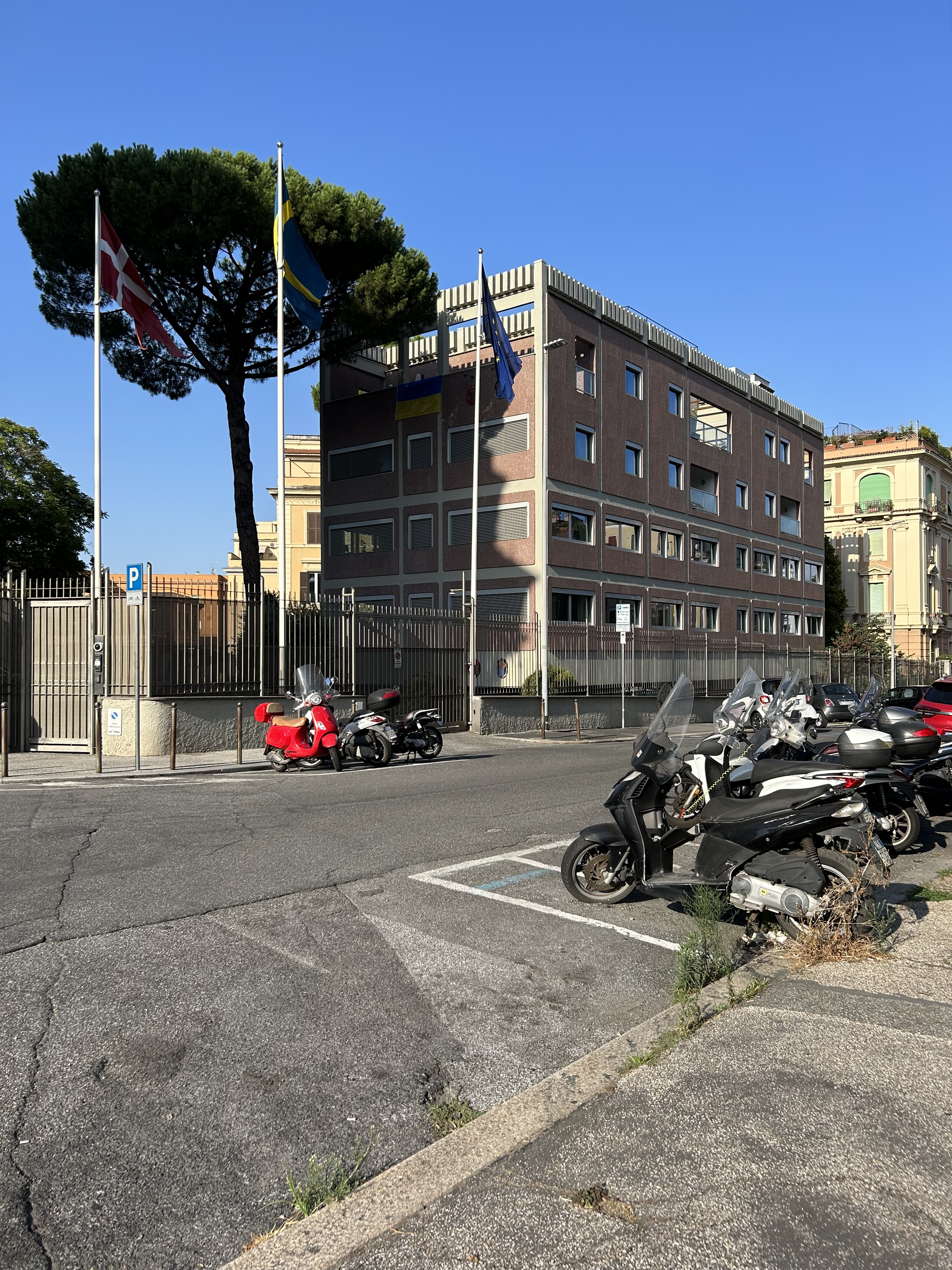
Embassy in Rome

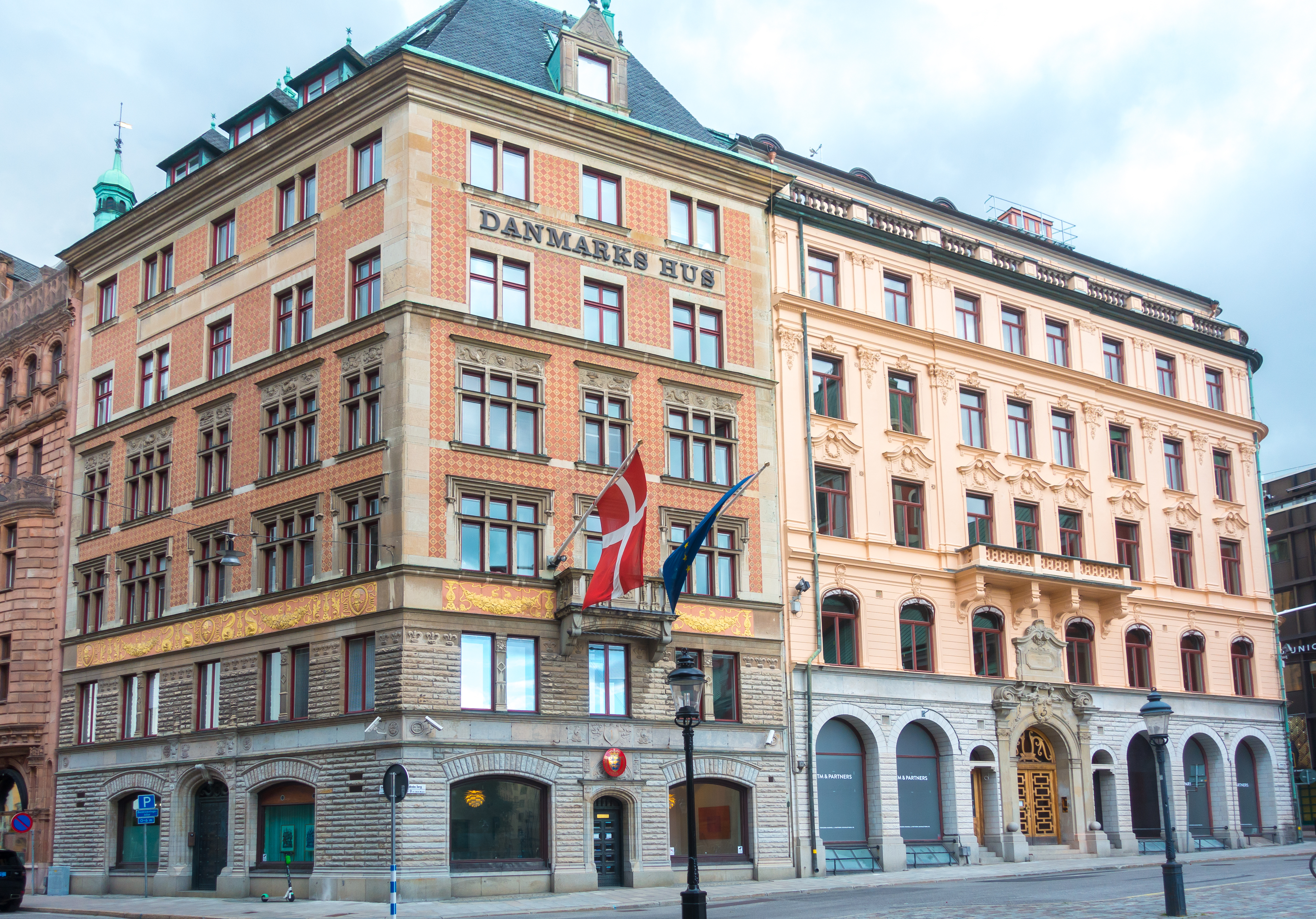
Embassy in Stockholm

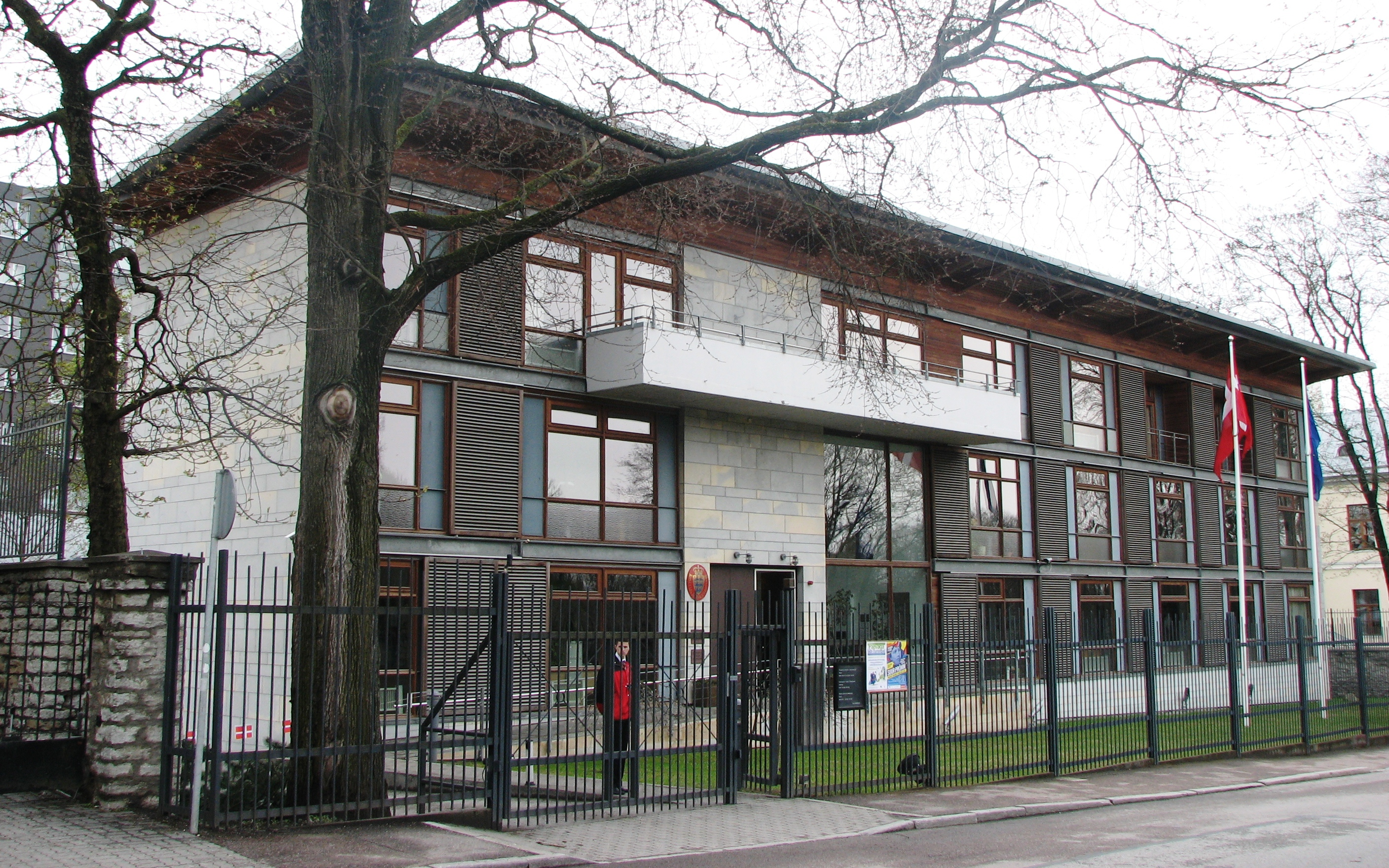
Embassy in Tallinn

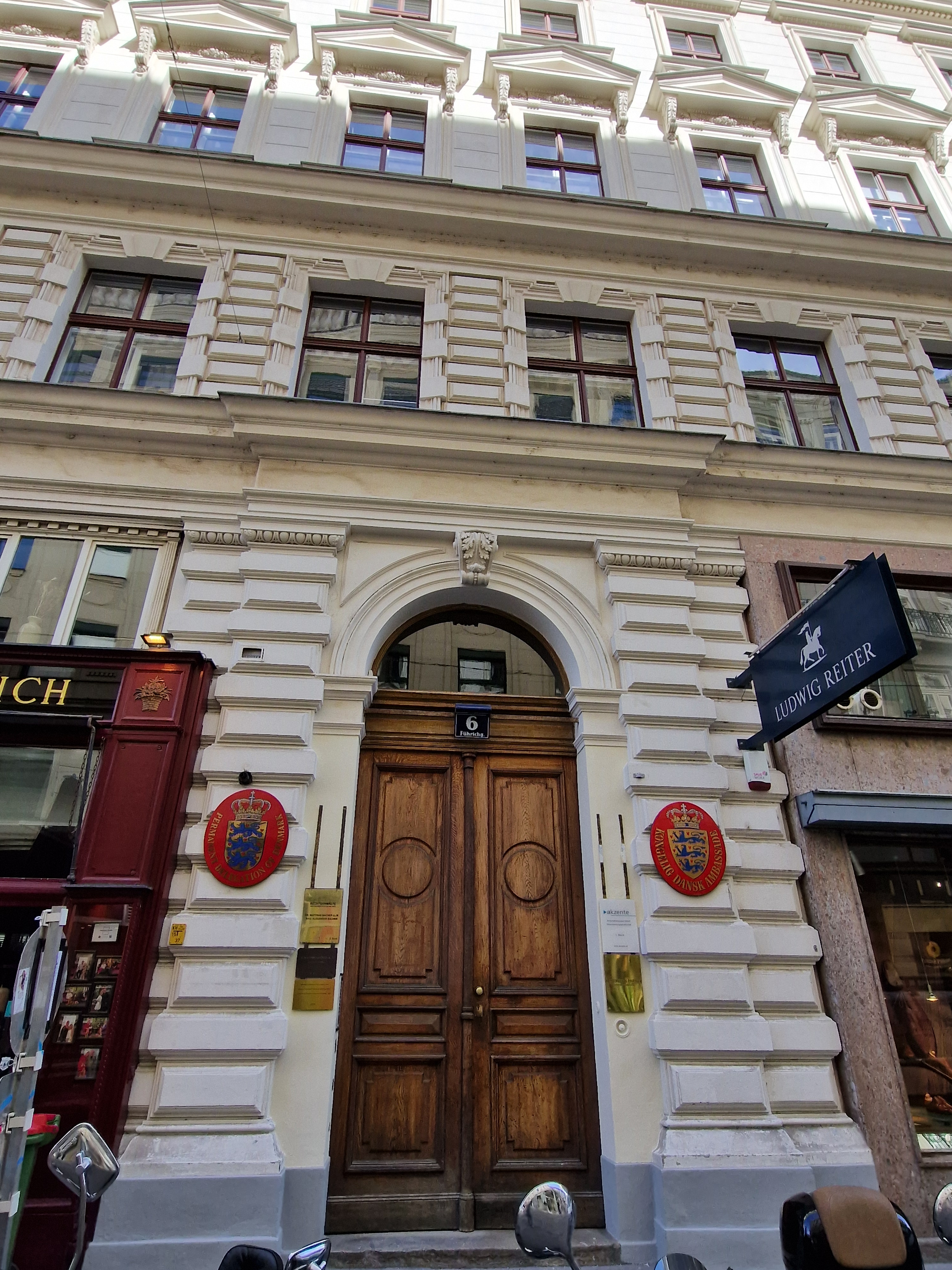
Embassy in Vienna

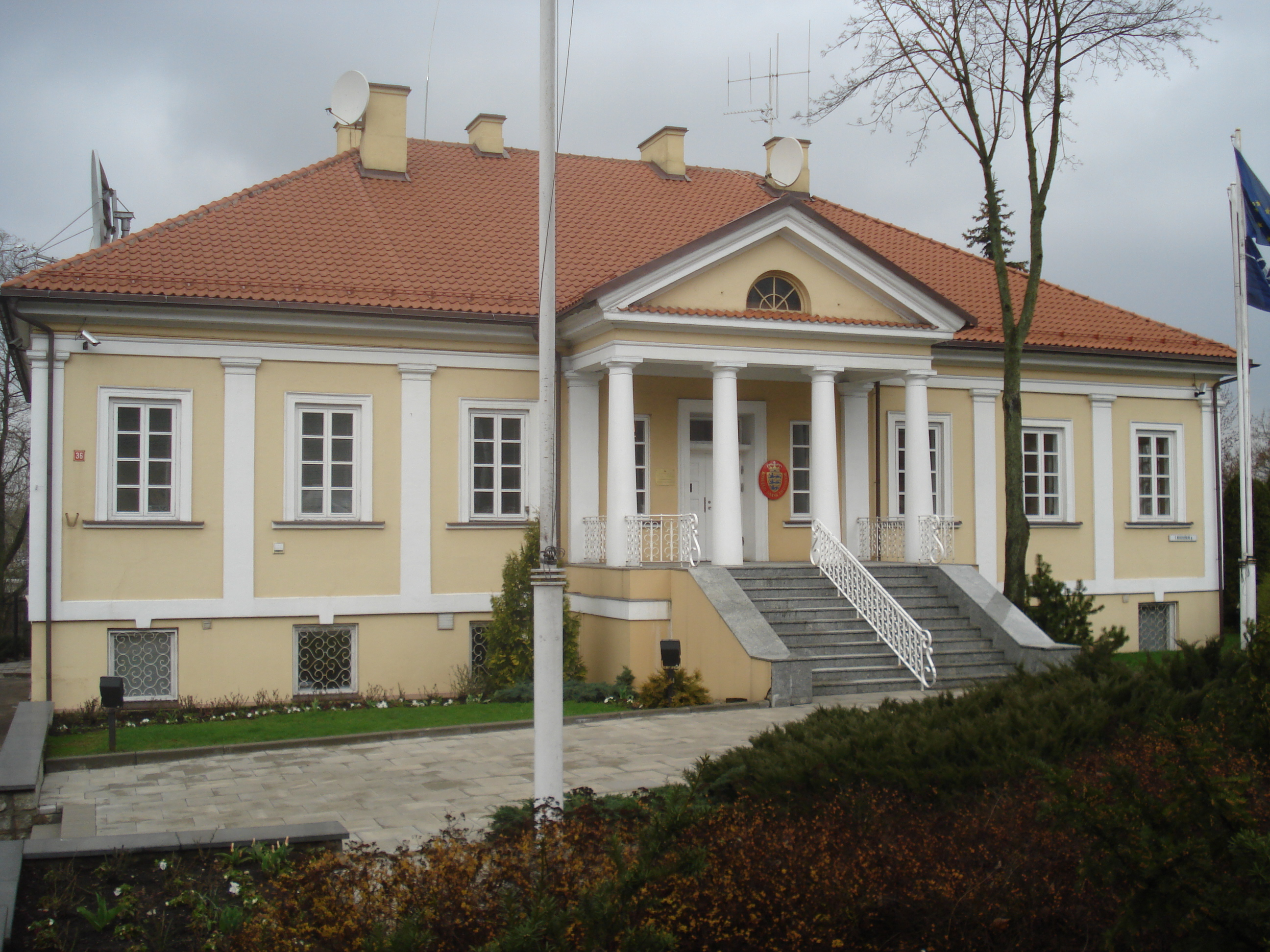
Embassy in Vilnius

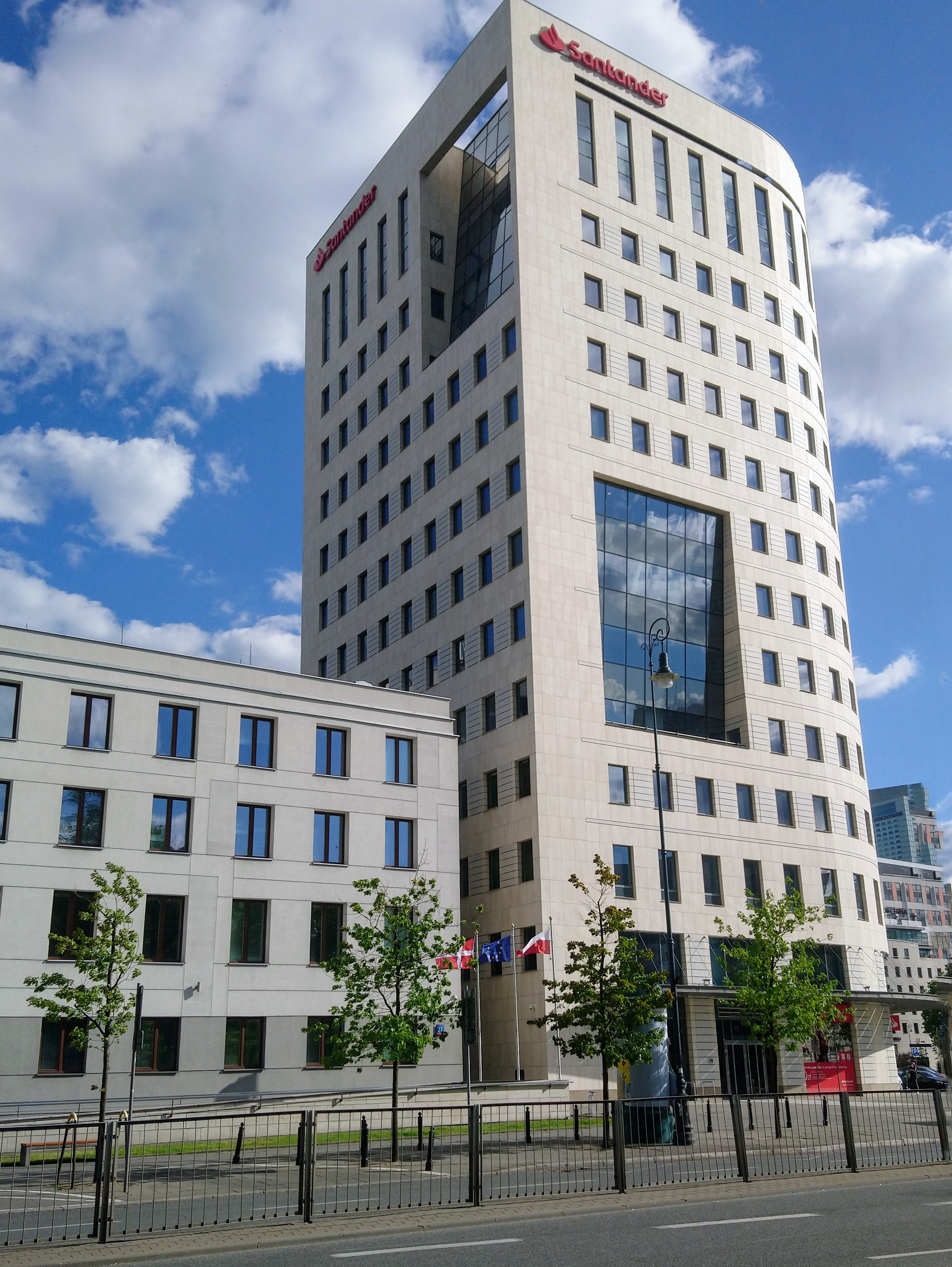
Embassy in Warsaw

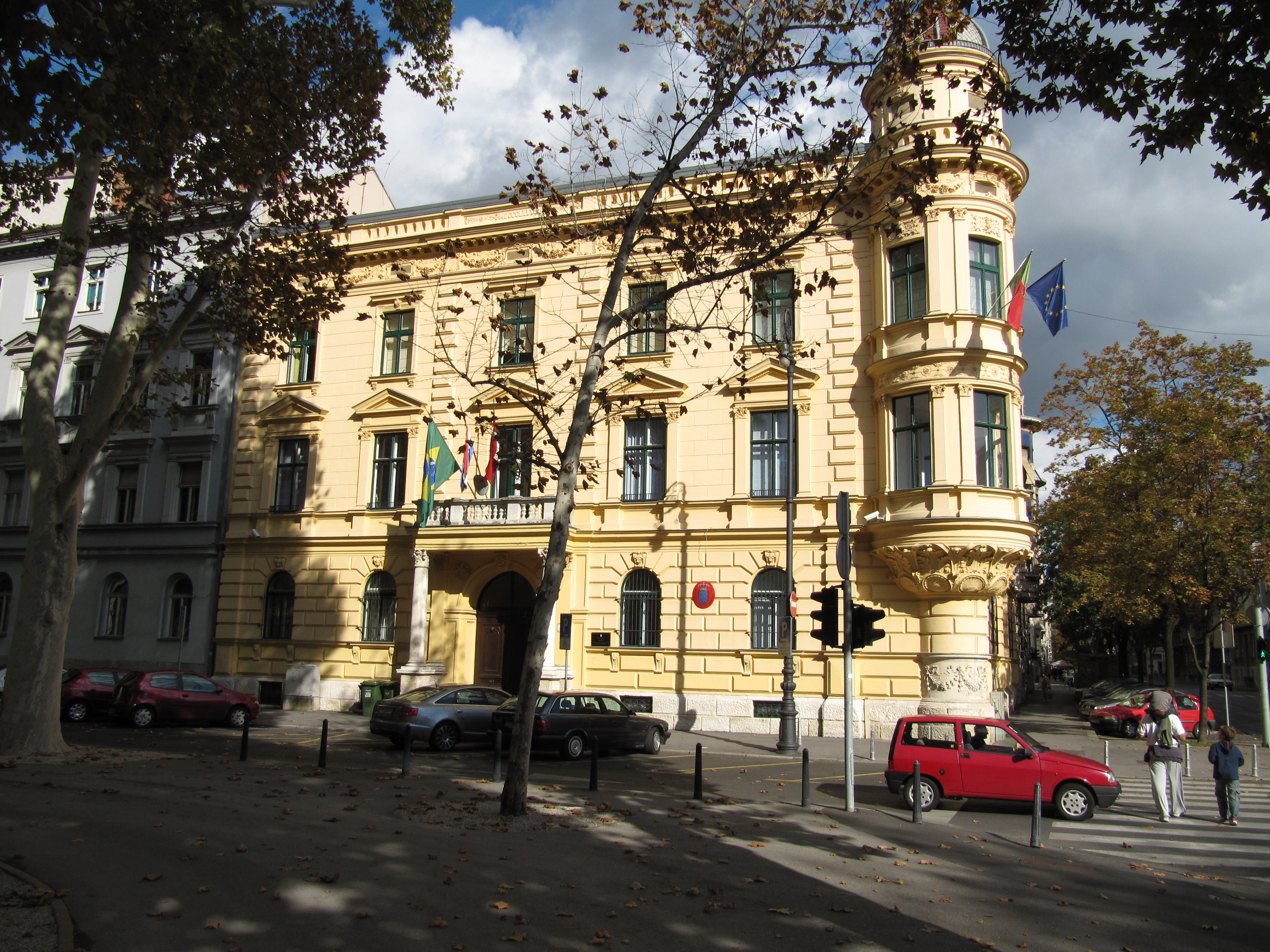
Embassy in Zagreb

=== Oceania ===
Host country	Host city	Mission	Concurrent accreditation	Ref.
Australia	Canberra	Embassy	Countries: Fiji; Nauru; New Zealand	
Australia	Sydney	Consulate-General	Countries: Fiji; Nauru; New Zealand	

=== Multilateral organizations ===
Organization	Host city	Host country	Mission	Concurrent accreditation	Ref.
Council of Europe	Strasbourg	France	Permanent Representation		
European Union	Brussels	Belgium	Permanent Representation (Note: Attached with a mission of the Faroe Islands.) (Note: Attached with a mission of Greenland.)		
NATO	Brussels	Belgium	Permanent Representation		
OECD	Paris	France	Permanent Representation		
United Nations	New York City	United States	Permanent Mission		
United Nations	Geneva	Switzerland	Permanent Mission	Multilateral Organizations: International Labour Organization; World Health Organization; World Trade Organization	
UNESCO	Paris	France	Permanent Delegation		

== Closed missions ==
=== Africa ===
Host country	Host city	Mission	Year closed	Ref.
Benin	Cotonou	Embassy	2014	
Burkina Faso	Ougadougou	Embassy	2026	
Eritrea	Asmara	Embassy	2003	
Libya	Tripoli	Embassy (Note: To be reopened)	2011	
Malawi	Lilongwe	Embassy	2002	
Mali	Bamako	Embassy	2025	
Mozambique	Maputo	Embassy	2017	
Zambia	Lusaka	Embassy	2014	
Zimbabwe	Harare	Embassy	2016	

=== Americas ===
Host country	Host city	Mission	Year closed	Ref.
Bolivia	La Paz	Embassy	2017	
Nicaragua	Managua	Embassy	2012	
Peru	Lima	Embassy	1987	

=== Asia ===
Host country	Host city	Mission	Year closed	Ref.
Afghanistan	Kabul	Embassy	2021	
China	Chongqing	Consulate-General	2021	
China	Hong Kong	Consulate-General	2012	
Jordan	Amman	Embassy	2010	
Iraq	Baghdad	Embassy	2024	
Nepal	Kathmandu	Embassy	2017	

=== Europe ===
Host country	Host city	Mission	Year closed	Ref.
Cyprus	Nicosia	Embassy	2014	
Luxembourg	Luxembourg City	Embassy	2014	
Slovakia	Bratislava	Embassy	2014	
Slovenia	Ljubljana	Embassy	2014	
Switzerland	Bern	Embassy	2014	

== See also ==
- Foreign relations of Denmark
  - Foreign relations of the Faroe Islands
  - Foreign relations of Greenland
- List of diplomatic missions of the Nordic countries
- List of ambassadors of Denmark
