= List of diplomatic missions of Iceland =

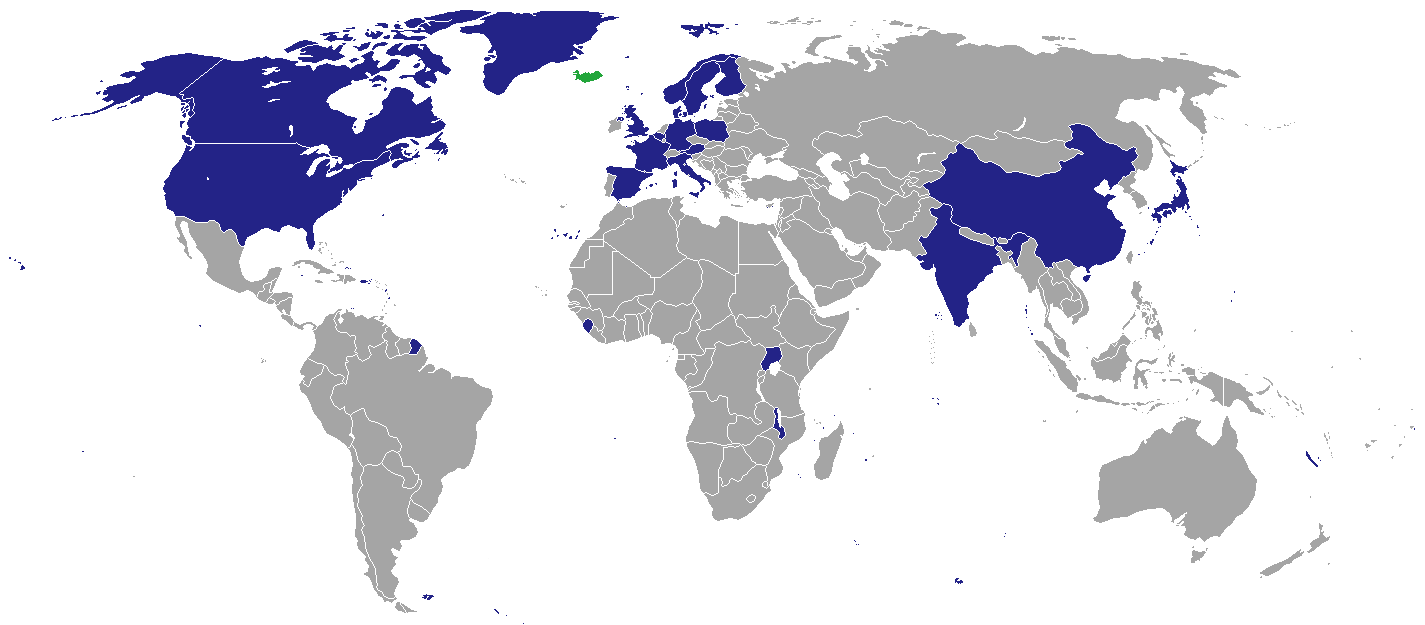
Countries with Icelandic diplomatic missions

This is a list of diplomatic missions of Iceland. In countries without Icelandic representation, Icelandic citizens can seek assistance from public officials in the foreign services of any of the other Nordic countries, in accordance with the Helsinki Treaty.

== Current missions ==
=== Africa ===
Host country	Host city	Mission	Concurrent accreditation	Ref.
Malawi	Lilongwe	Embassy		
Sierra Leone	Freetown	Embassy		
Uganda	Kampala	Embassy	Countries: Kenya	

=== Americas ===
Host country	Host city	Mission	Concurrent accreditation	Ref.
Canada	Ottawa	Embassy		
Canada	Winnipeg	Consulate-General		
United States	Washington, D.C.	Embassy	Countries: Brazil; Mexico; International Organizations: Organization of American States (Note: Accredited as an observer mission.)	

=== Asia ===
Host country	Host city	Mission	Concurrent accreditation	Ref.
China	Beijing	Embassy	Countries: Cambodia; Mongolia; Vietnam	
India	New Delhi	Embassy	Countries: Australia; Malaysia; Nepal; New Zealand; Sri Lanka	
Japan	Tokyo	Embassy	Countries: Brunei; Indonesia; Philippines; Singapore; South Korea; Thailand; International Organizations: Association of Southeast Asian Nations	

=== Europe ===
Host country	Host city	Mission	Concurrent accreditation	Ref.
Austria	Vienna	Embassy	Countries: Croatia; Hungary; Slovakia; Slovenia; International Organizations: Comprehensive Nuclear-Test-Ban Treaty Organization; International Atomic Energy Agency; Organization for Security and Co-operation in Europe; United Nations Office at Vienna	
Belgium	Brussels	Embassy	Countries: Luxembourg; Netherlands; International Organizations: European Union	
Denmark	Copenhagen	Embassy	Countries: Greece	
Denmark	Nuuk, Greenland	Consulate-General	Countries: Greece	
Denmark	Tórshavn, Faroe Islands	Consulate-General	Countries: Greece	
Finland	Helsinki	Embassy	Countries: Estonia; Latvia; Lithuania	
France	Paris	Embassy	Countries: Algeria; Lebanon; Monaco; Morocco; Portugal; Tunisia; International Organizations: OECD; UNESCO	
Germany	Berlin	Embassy	Countries: Czechia	
Italy	Rome	Embassy	Countries: San Marino; International Organizations: Food and Agriculture Organization; International Fund for Agricultural Development; World Food Programme	
Norway	Oslo	Embassy	Countries: Egypt; Pakistan; Turkey	
Poland	Warsaw	Embassy	Countries: Bulgaria; Georgia; Romania; Ukraine	
Spain	Madrid	Embassy	Countries: Andorra; Argentina; Chile; Colombia; Peru; Venezuela	
Sweden	Stockholm	Embassy	Countries: Cyprus	
United Kingdom	London	Embassy	Countries: Ireland; Malta; International Organizations: International Maritime Organization	

=== Multilateral organizations ===
Organization	Host city	Host country	Mission	Concurrent accreditation	Ref.
Council of Europe	Strasbourg	France	Permanent Representation		
NATO	Brussels	Belgium	Permanent Delegation		
United Nations	New York City	United States	Permanent Mission	Countries: Cuba; Dominican Republic	
United Nations	Geneva	Switzerland	Permanent Mission	Countries: Holy See; Liechtenstein; Switzerland; International Organizations: European Free Trade Association; International Labour Organization; World Health Organization; World Meteorological Organization; World Trade Organization	

== Gallery ==
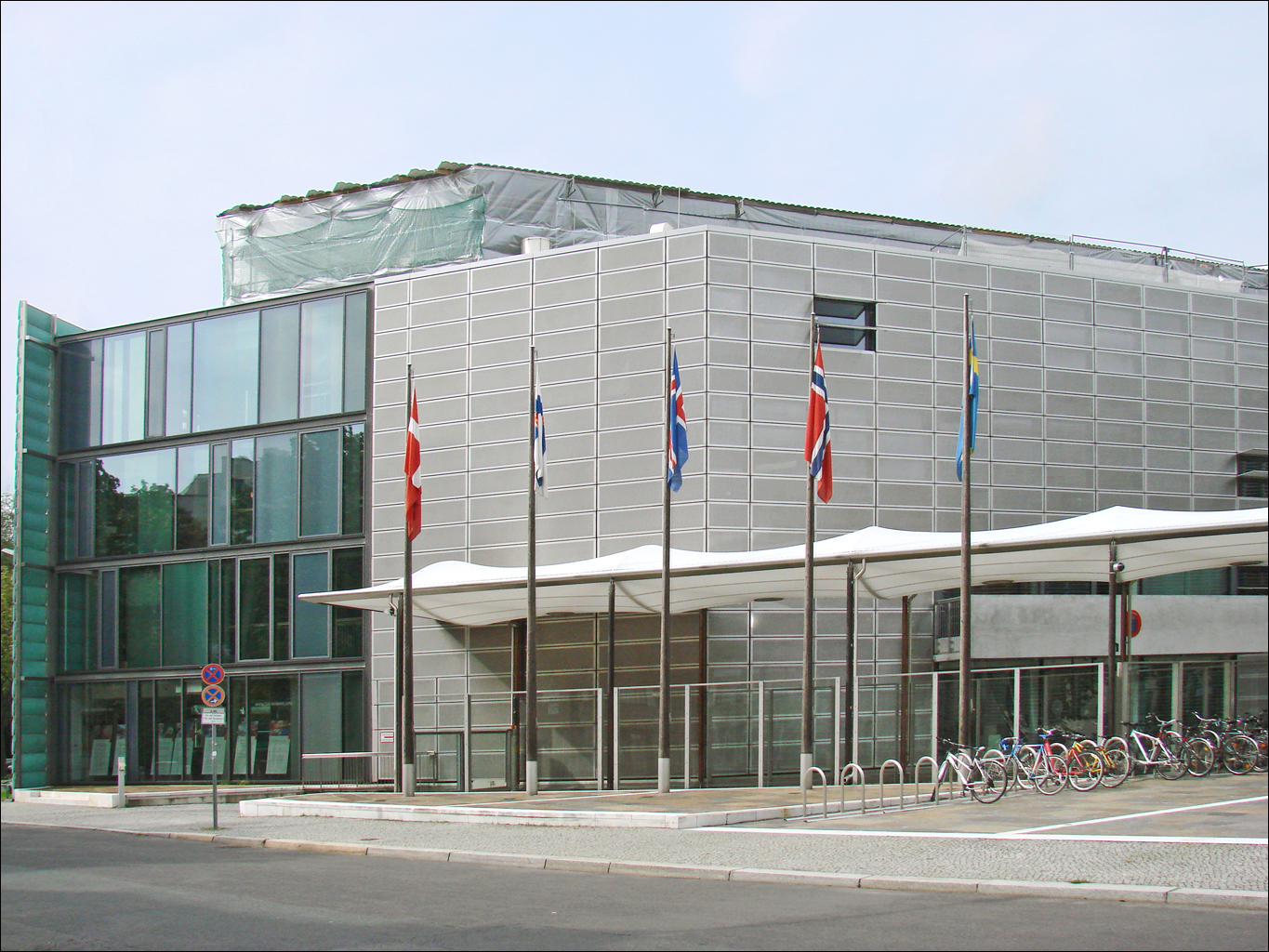
Embassy in Berlin

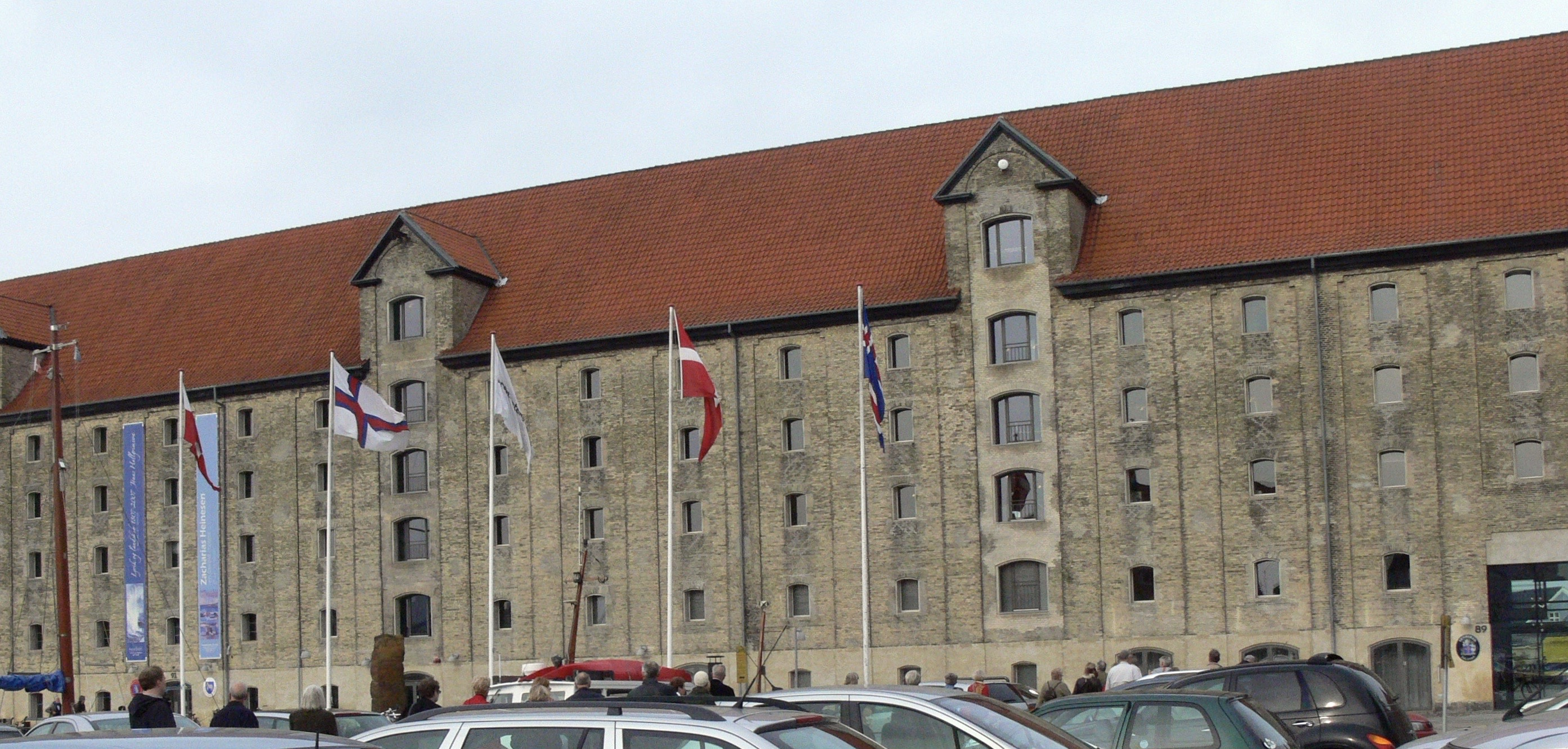
Building hosting the embassy in Copenhagen

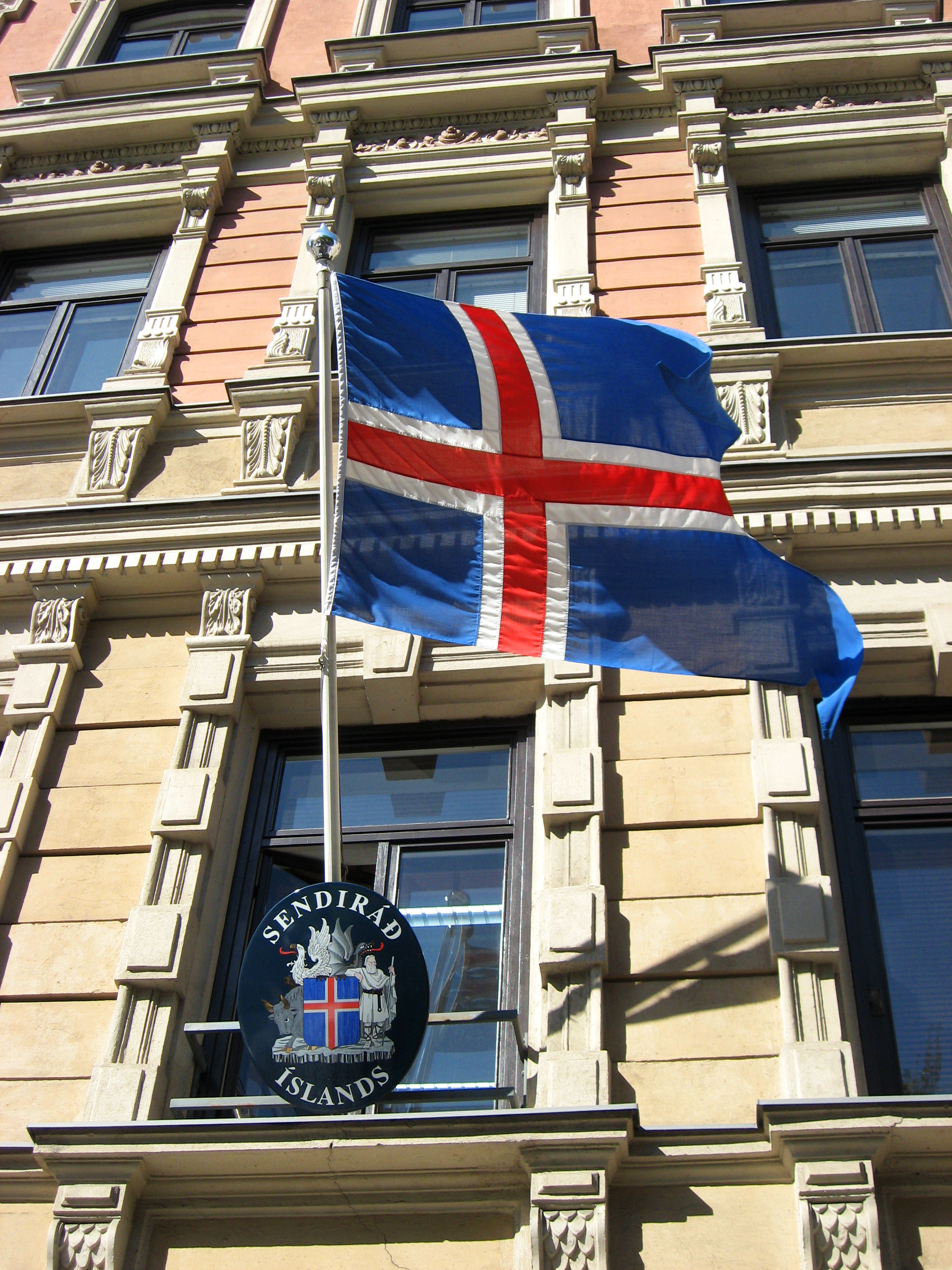
Building hosting the embassy in Helsinki

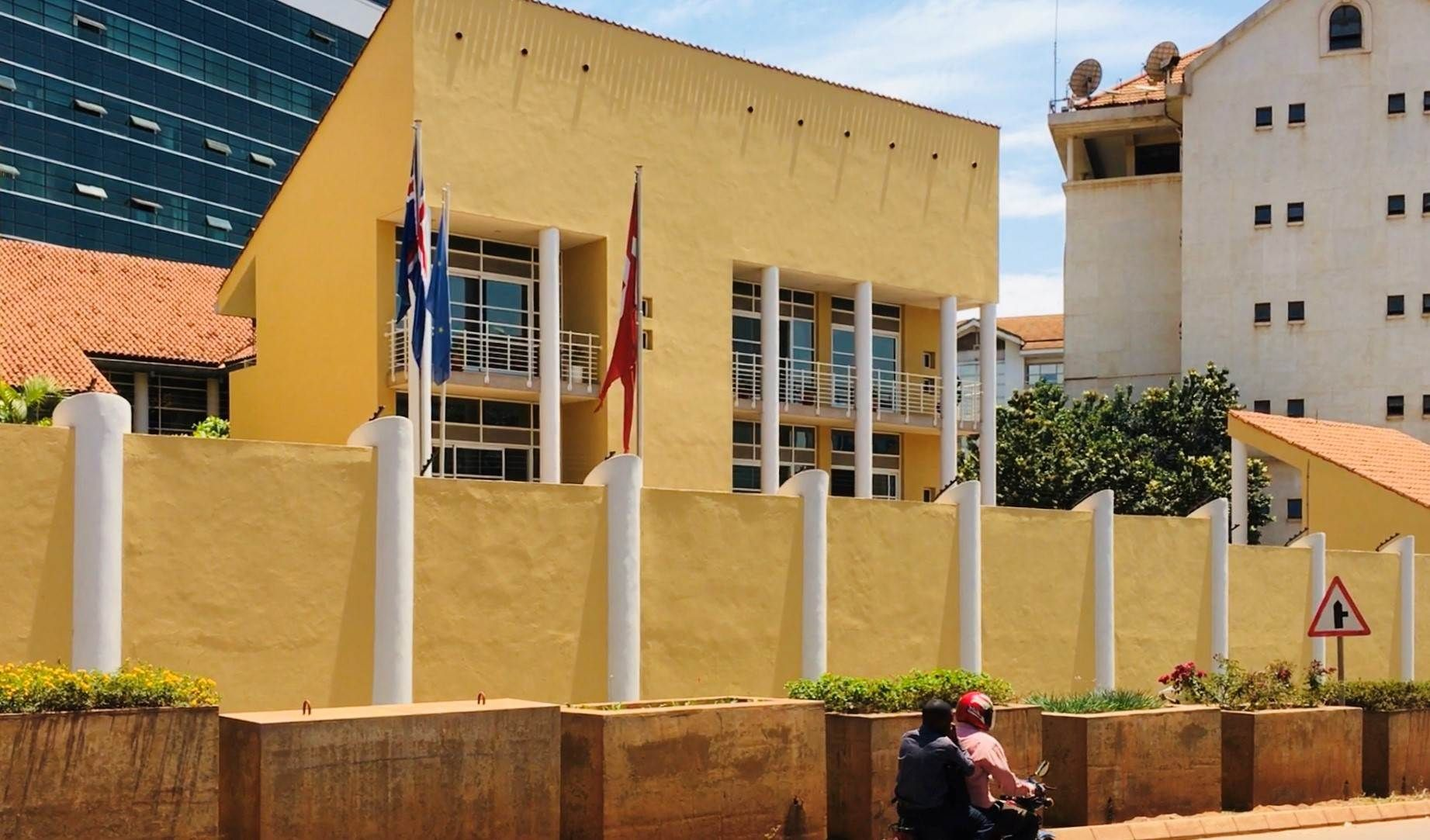
Embassy in Kampala

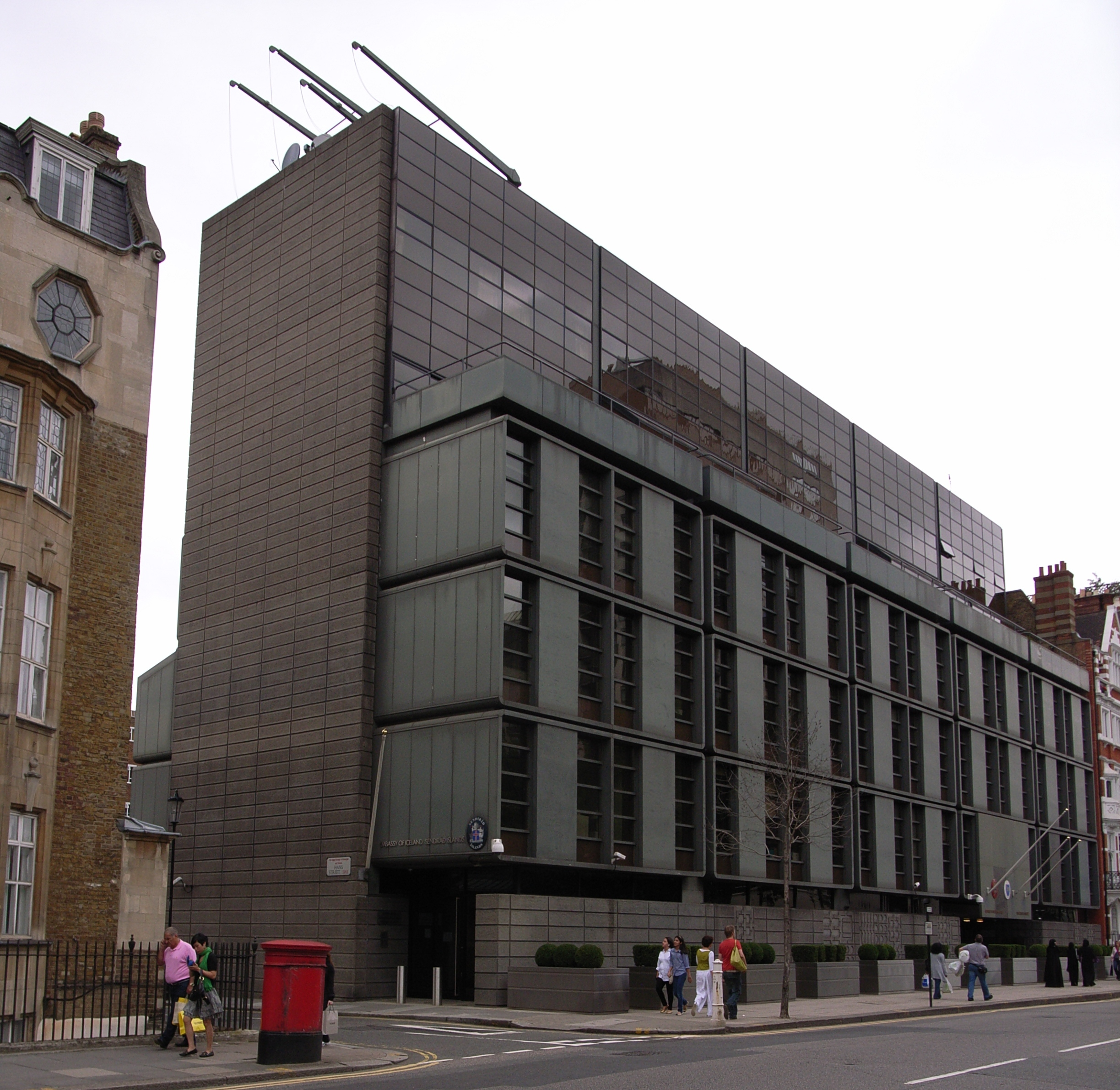
Building hosting the embassy in London

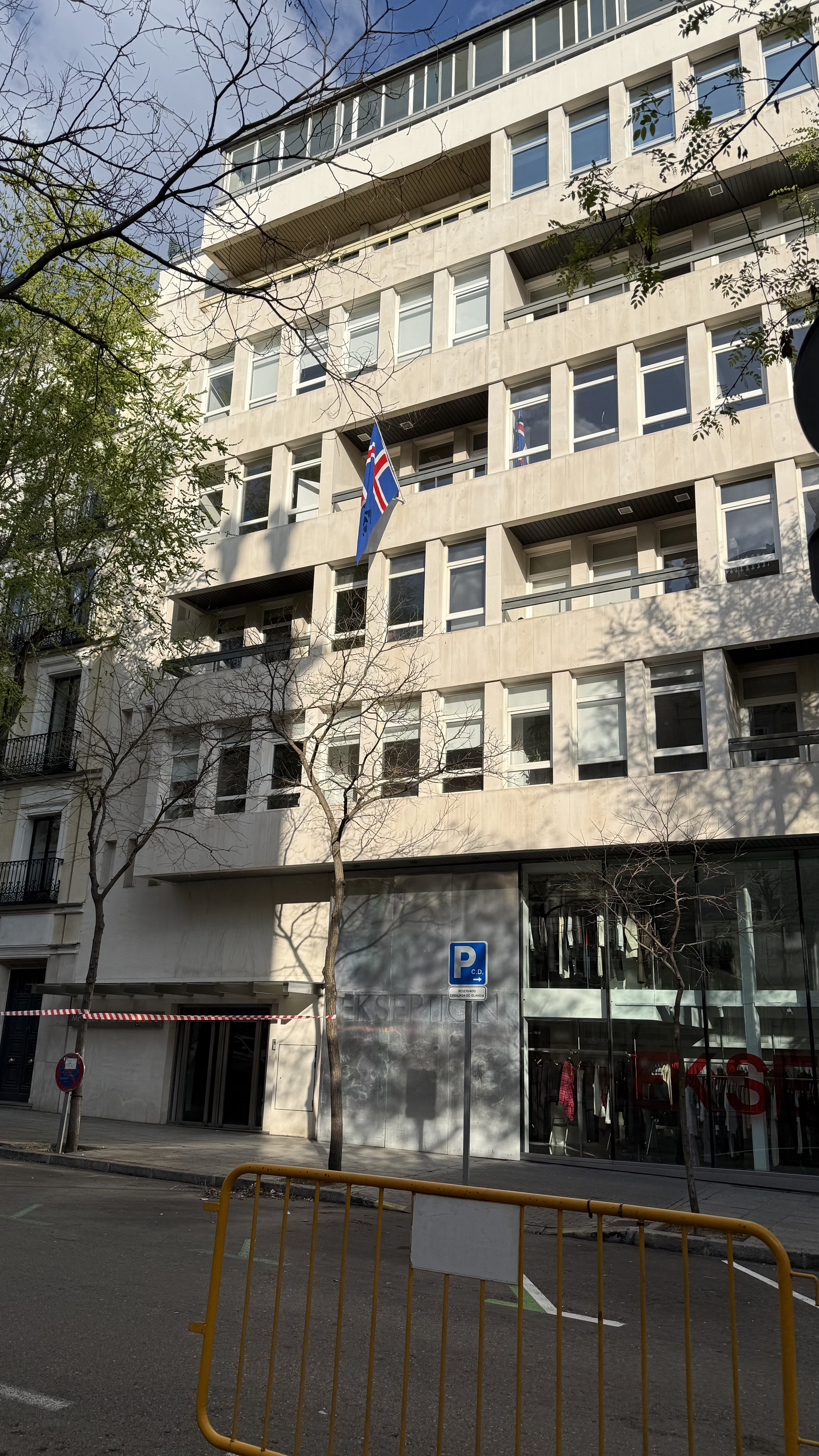
Embassy in Madrid

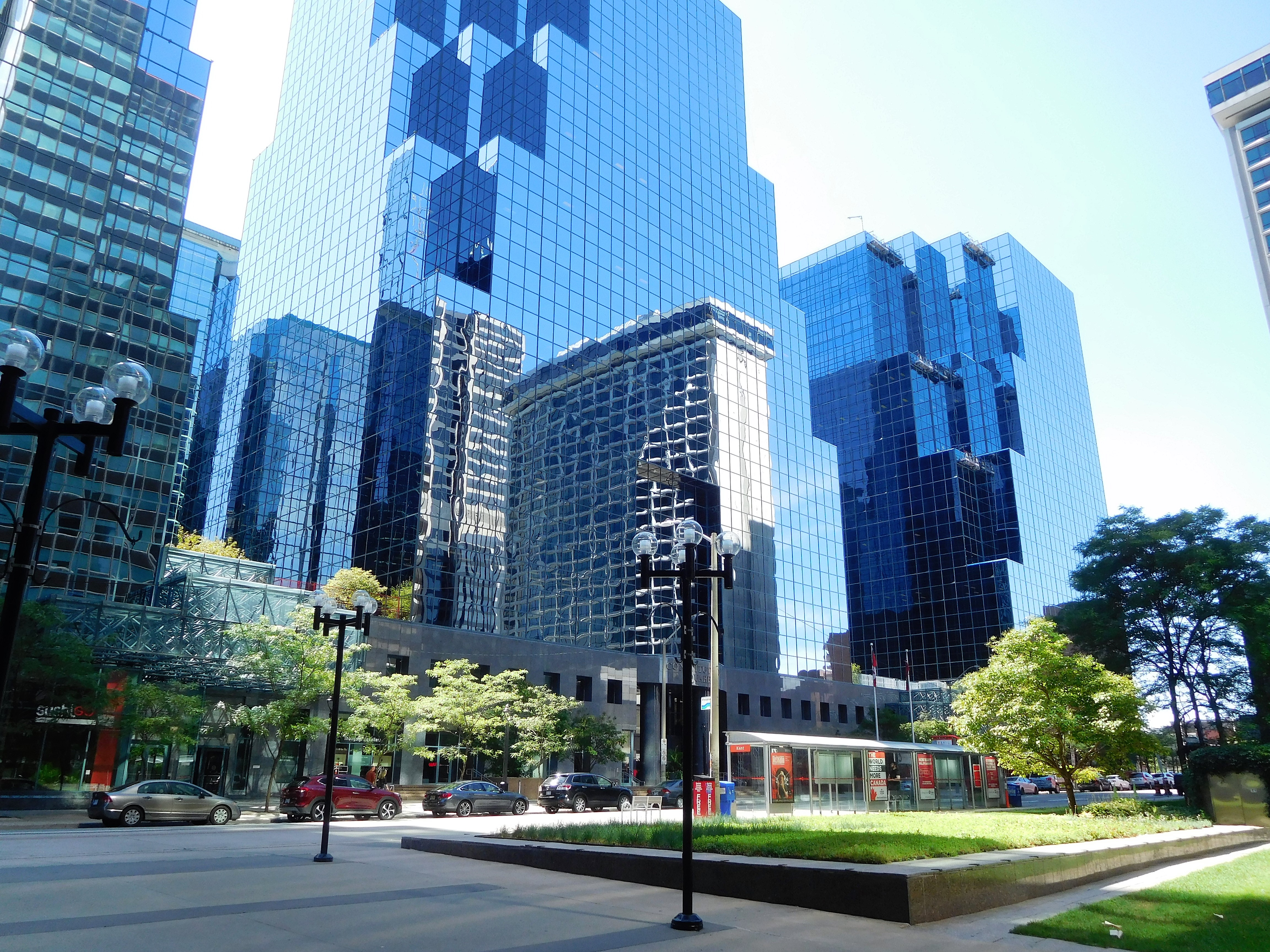
Building hosting the Embassy in Ottawa

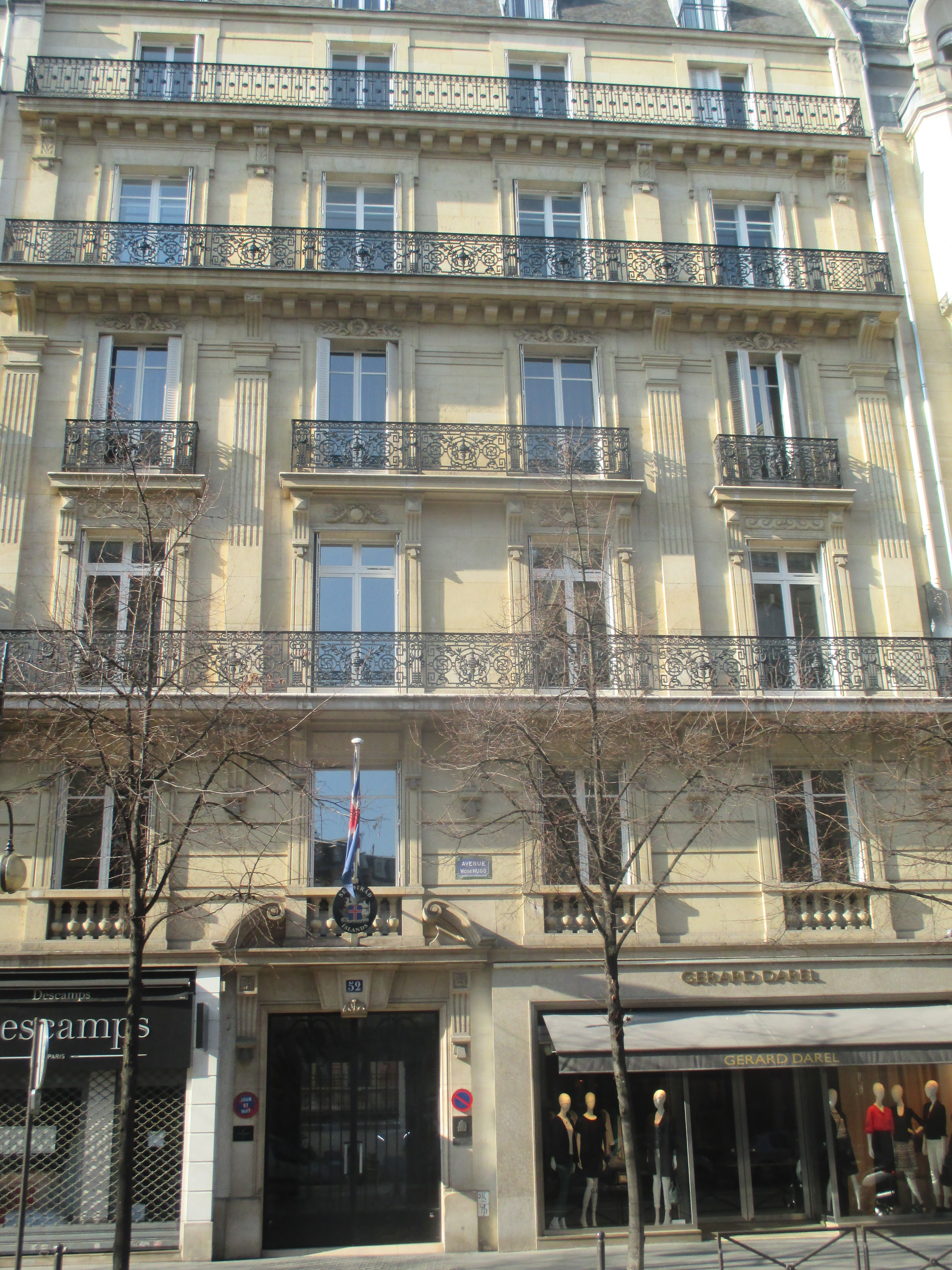
Embassy in Paris

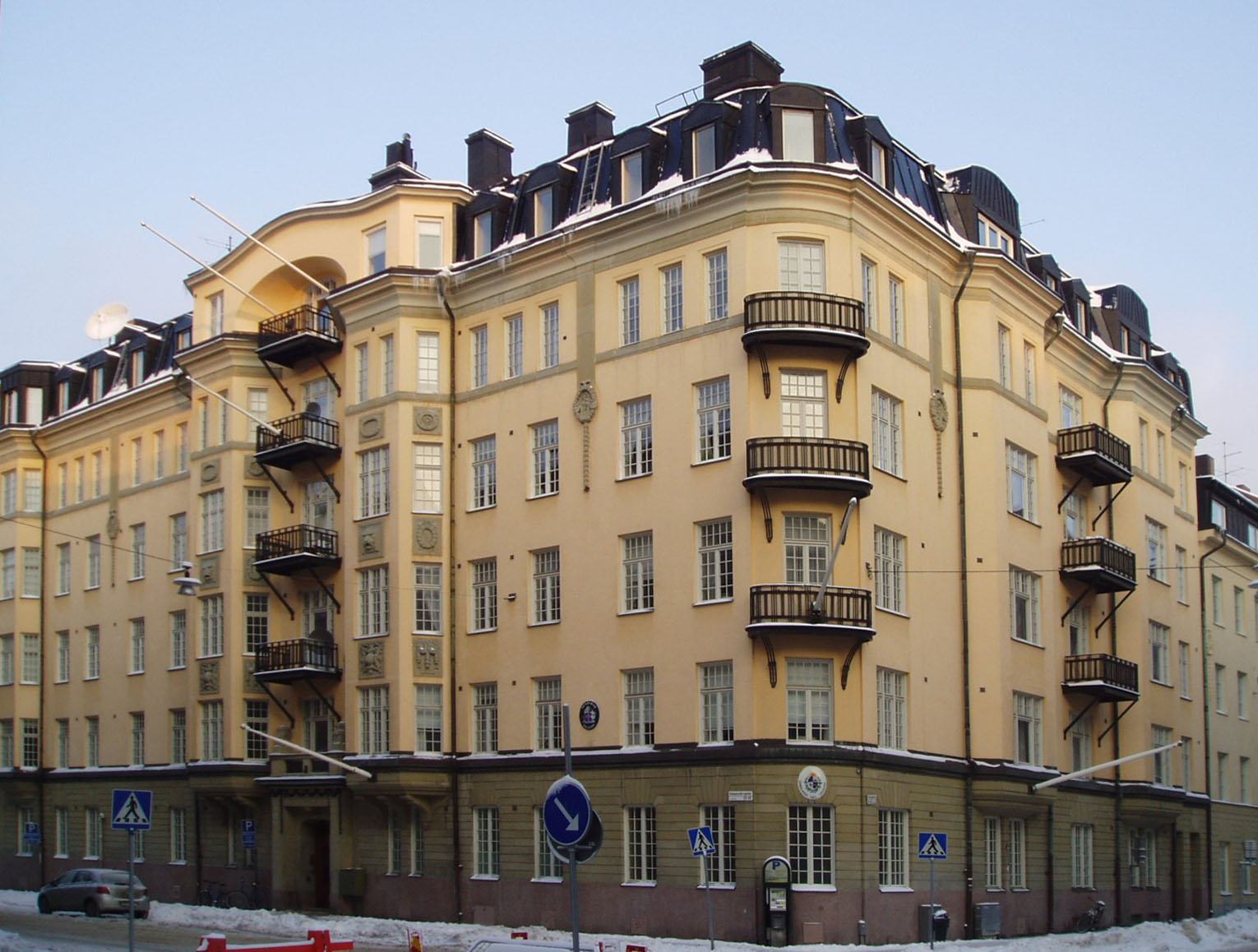
Building hosting the embassy in Stockholm

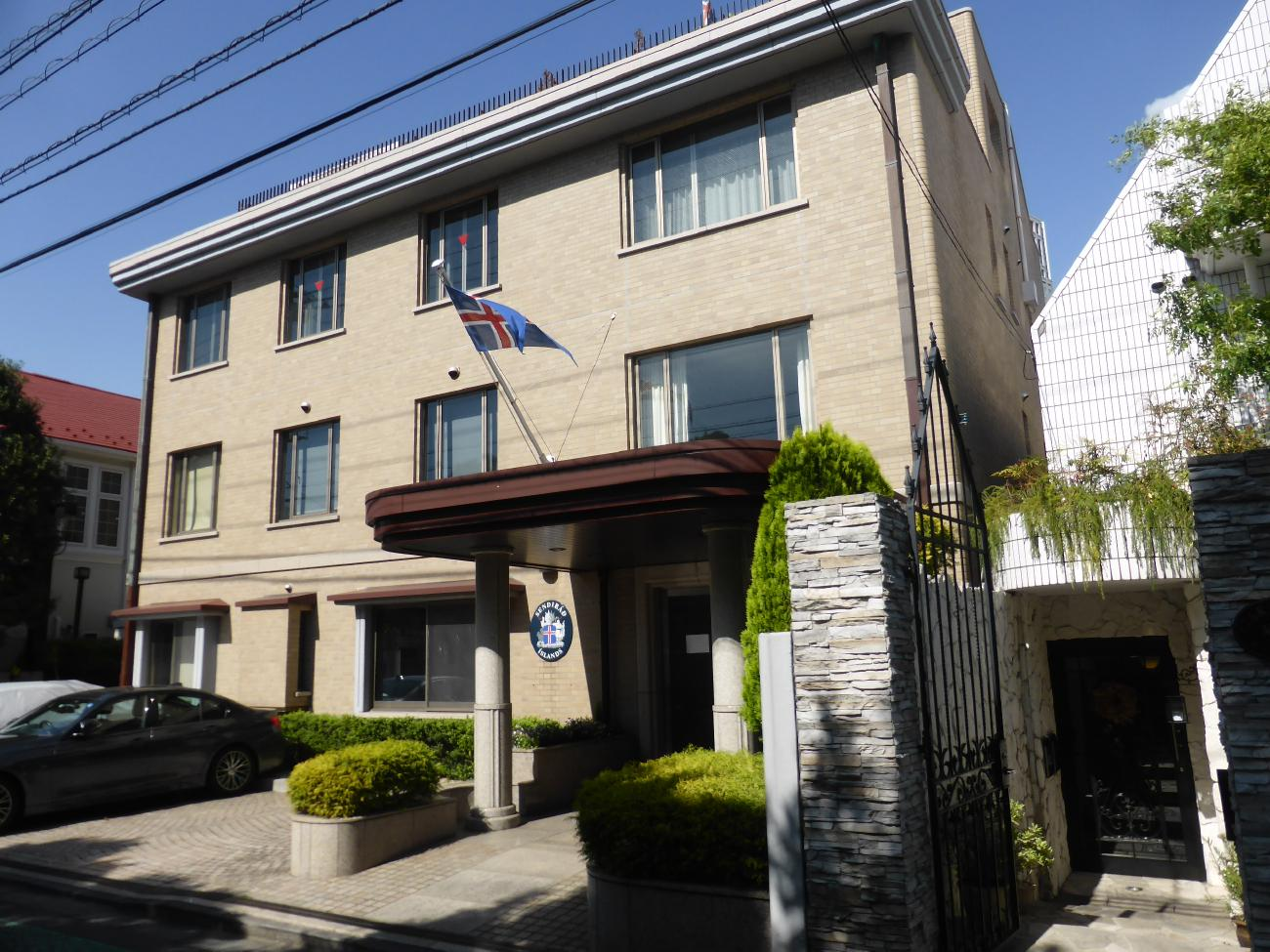
Embassy in Tokyo

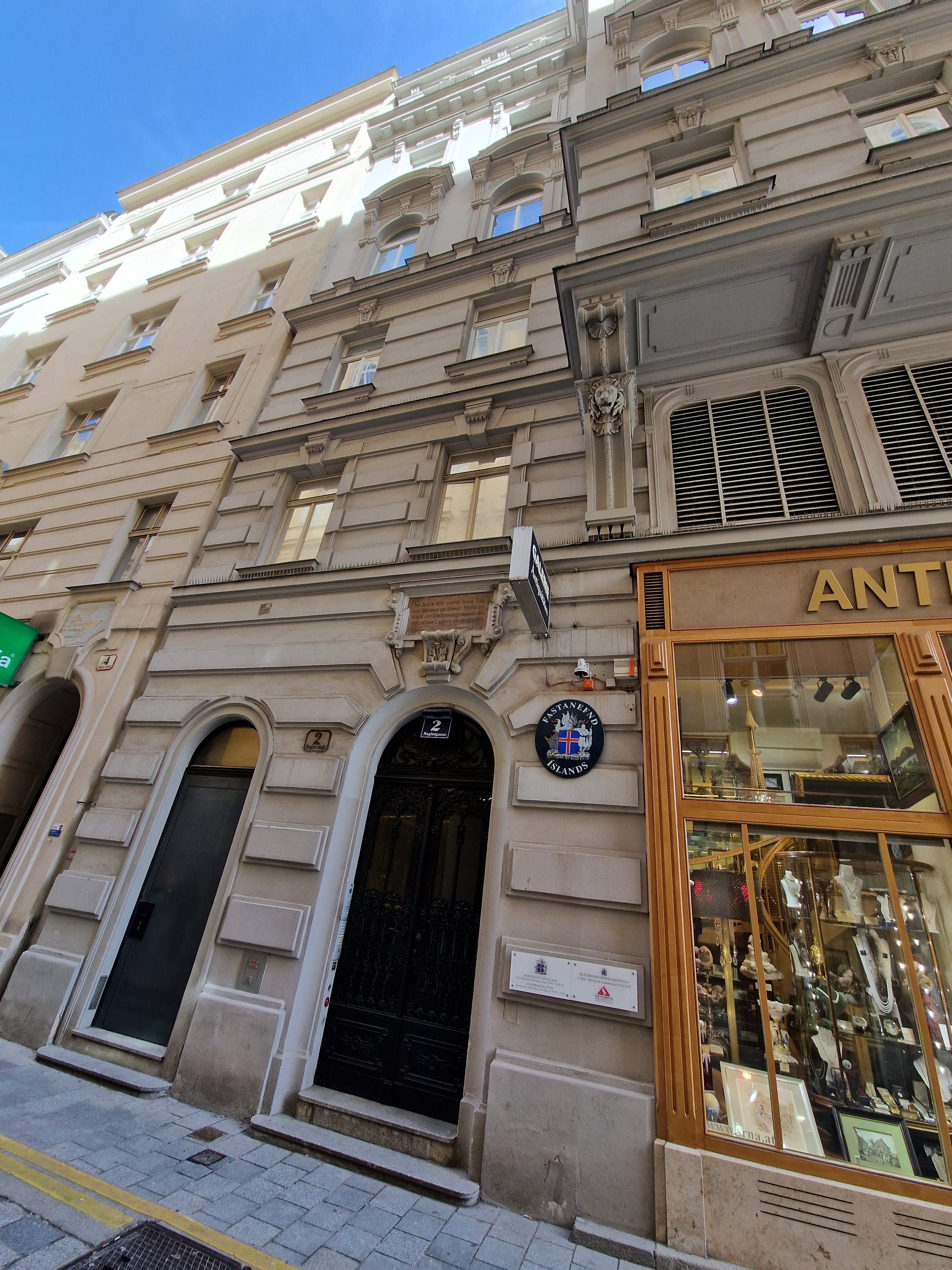
Embassy in Vienna

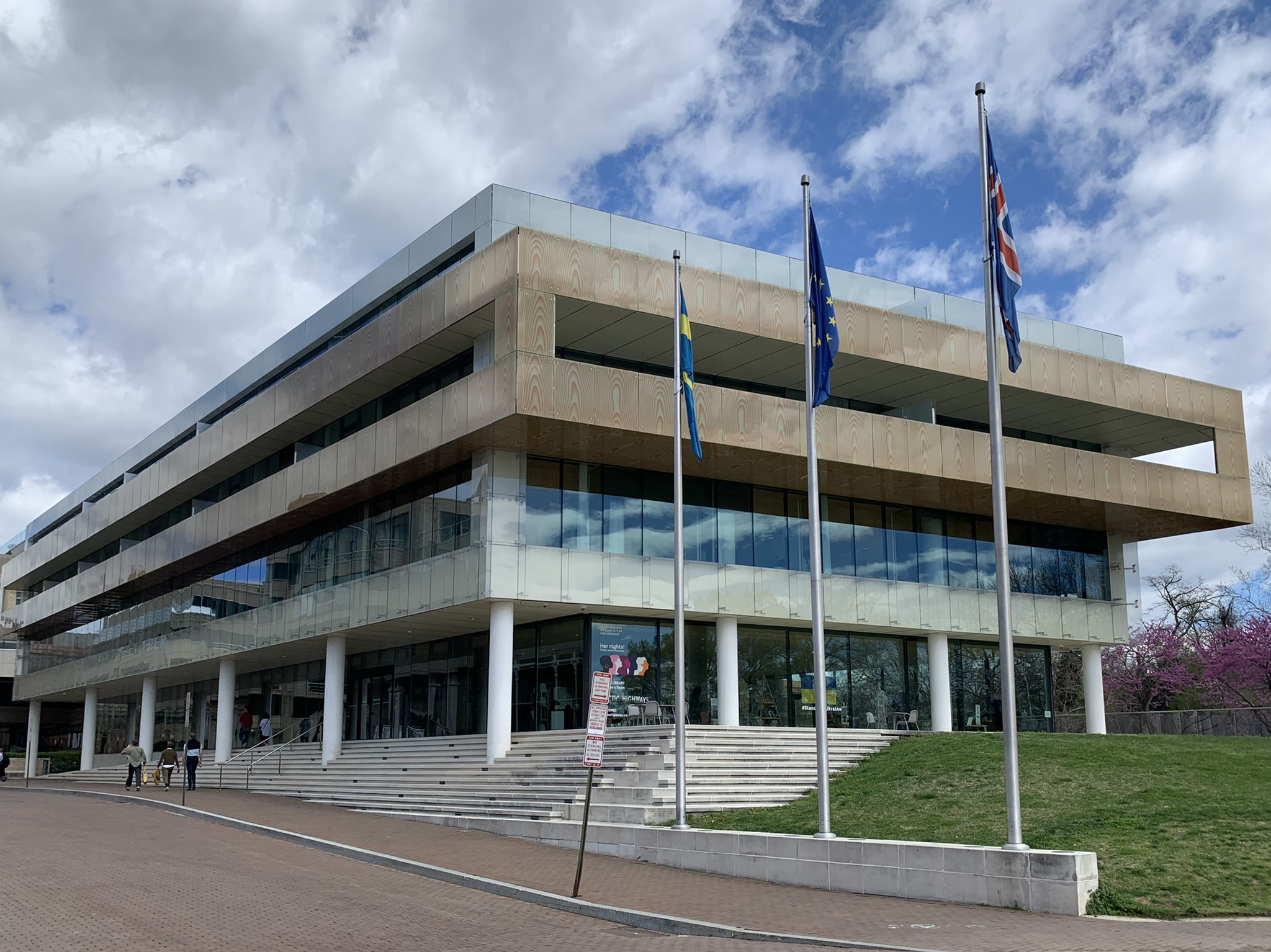
Building hosting the embassy in Washington, D.C.

== Closed missions ==
=== Africa ===
Host country	Host city	Mission	Year closed	Ref.
Mozambique	Maputo	Embassy	2018	
Namibia	Windhoek	Embassy	2018	
South Africa	Pretoria	Embassy	2009	

=== Americas ===
Host country	Host city	Mission	Year closed	Ref.
Nicaragua	Managua	Embassy	2009	
United States	New York City	Consulate-General	2024	

=== Asia ===
Host country	Host city	Mission	Year closed	Ref.
China	Shanghai	Consulate-General	Unknown	

=== Europe ===
Host country	Host city	Mission	Year closed	Ref.
Russia	Moscow	Embassy	2023	

== See also ==
- List of diplomatic missions of the Nordic countries
- List of diplomatic missions in Iceland
- Visa policy of the Schengen Area
