= List of diplomatic missions of the Nordic countries =

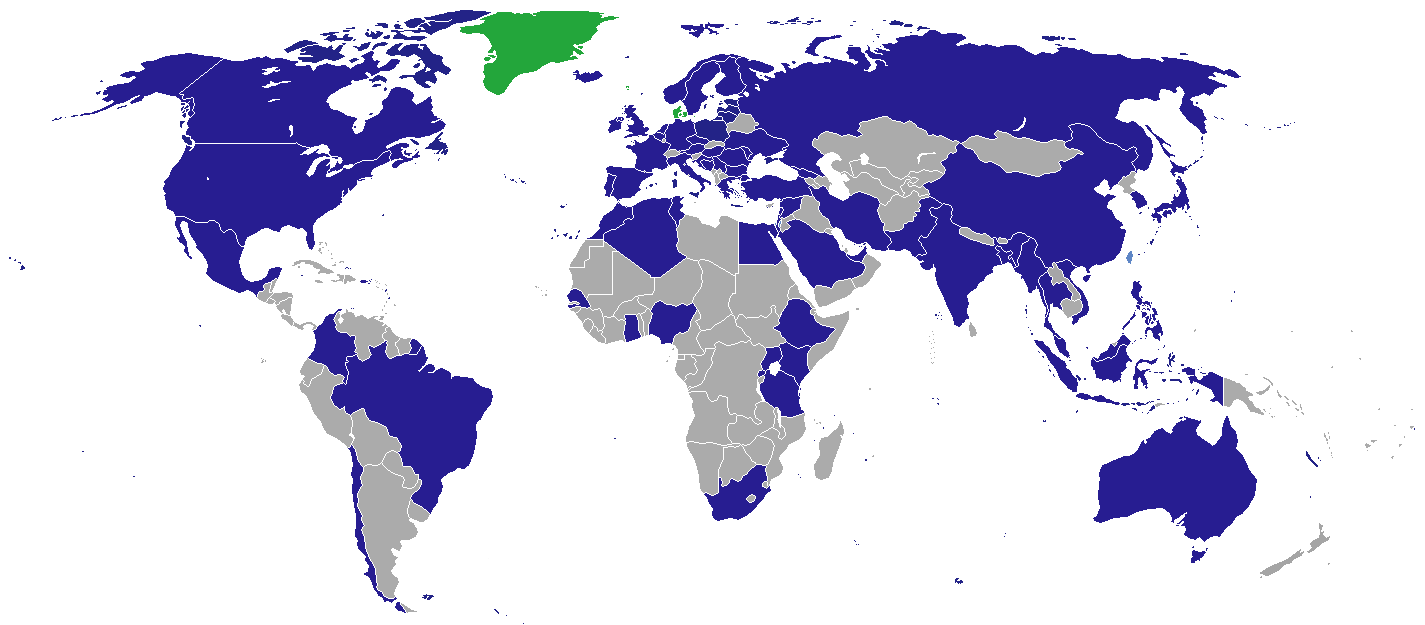
Diplomatic missions of Denmark

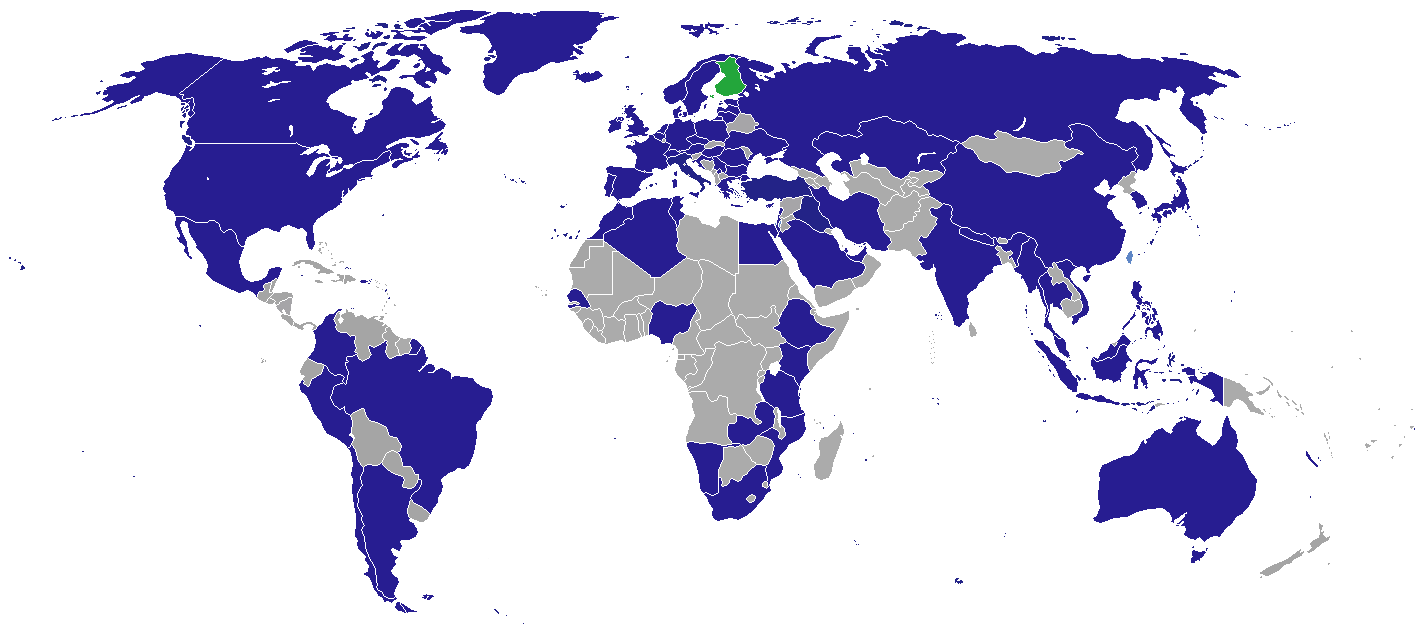
Diplomatic missions of Finland

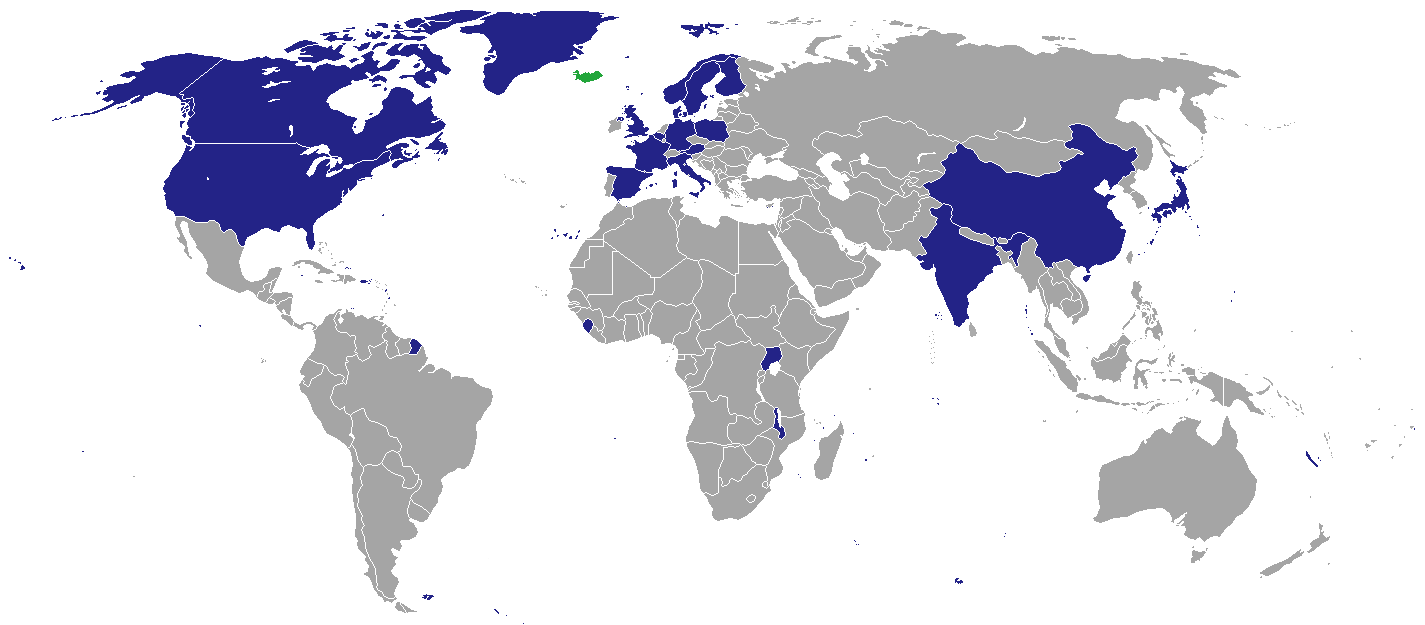
Diplomatic missions of Iceland

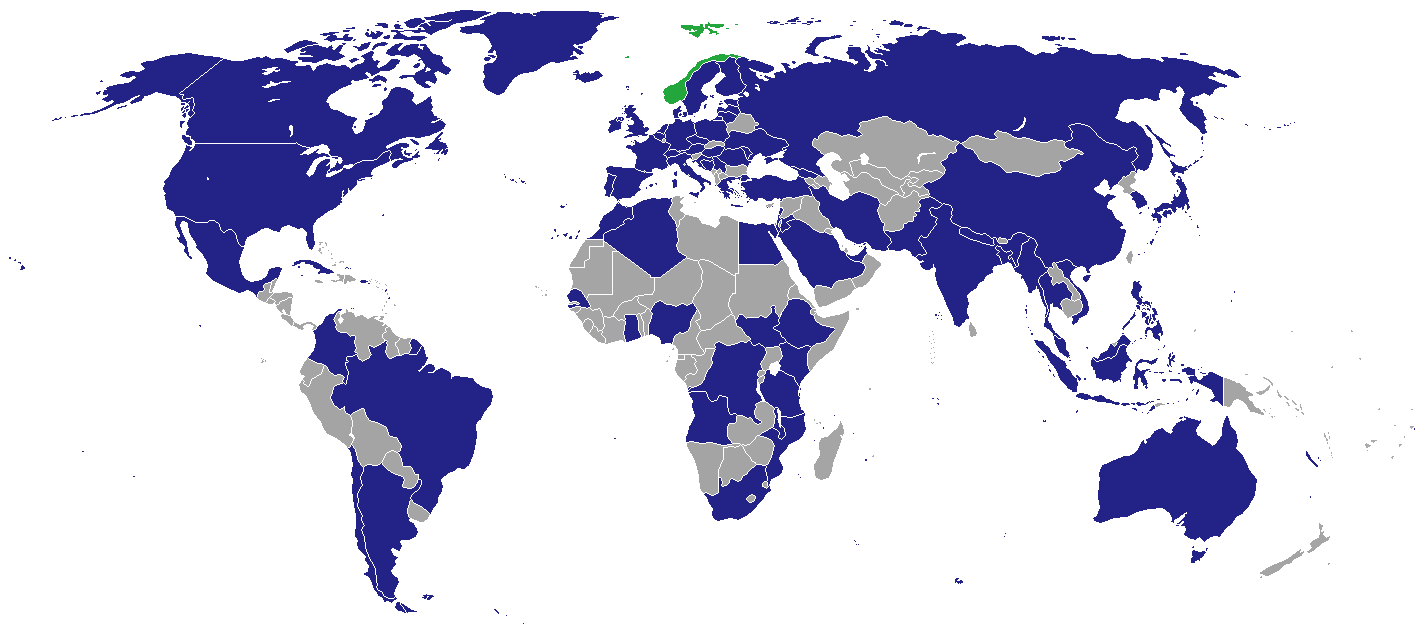
Diplomatic missions of Norway

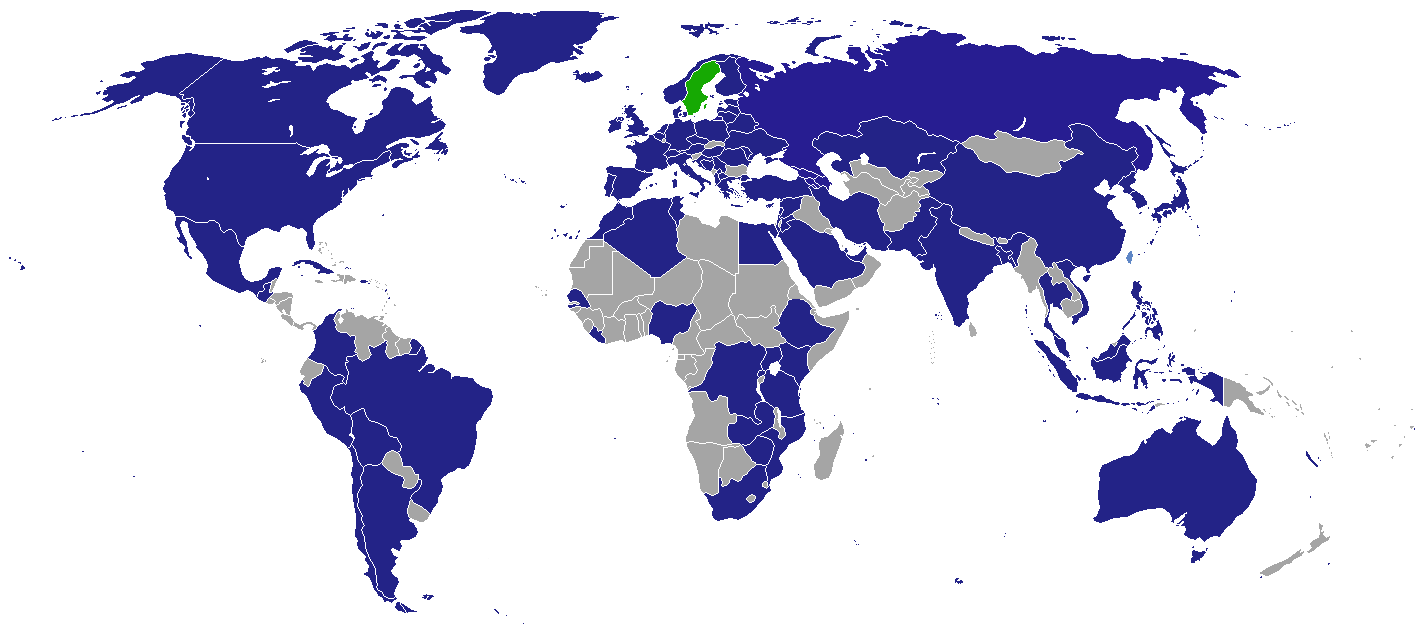
Diplomatic missions of Sweden

This is a list of diplomatic missions of the Nordic countries, which consists of Denmark, Finland, Iceland, Norway, and Sweden. In some countries, all or some of the Nordic countries have joint embassies. Examples includes the Nordic Embassies in Berlin (all the Nordic countries), the Nordic House in Yangon (Denmark, Finland, Norway and Sweden) and the Nordic Embassy in Dhaka (Denmark, Norway and Sweden).

The countries cooperate closely, and the Helsinki Treaty sets the framework for the Nordic cooperation in the Nordic Council and the Nordic Council of Ministers. According to the Helsinki Treaty, public officials in the foreign services of any of the Nordic countries are to assist citizens of another Nordic country if that country is not represented in the territory concerned. There are also common Nordic instructions on consular co-operation, and on strengthening of the consular contingency co-operation.

Co-operation in the foreign service is one of the proposals in the so-called Stoltenberg report, prepared on behalf of the Nordic foreign ministers. In 2019, a group of researchers from the Nordic foreign policy institutes evaluated whether the report's proposals had been followed up in practice. They judged that there had been significant progress in co-operation between the foreign services. A 2020 report by Björn Bjarnason, appointed by the Nordic foreign ministers, reports on ways the Nordic countries can work more closely together on foreign and defence policy. Some proposed measures are a common Nordic diplomacy and an enhanced role of diplomatic missions.

The Nordic countries have also signed a memorandum of understanding with the Baltic states on the posting of diplomats at each other's missions abroad, under the auspices of Nordic-Baltic Eight.

== Africa ==
	Denmark	Finland	Iceland	Norway	Sweden
Algeria	Algiers (Embassy)	Algiers (Embassy)		Algiers (Embassy)	Algiers (Embassy)
Angola				Luanda (Embassy)	
Burkina Faso	Ouagadougou (Embassy)				
Congo-Kinshasa				Kinshasa (Embassy)	Kinshasa (Embassy)
Egypt	Cairo (Embassy)	Cairo (Embassy)		Cairo (Embassy)	Cairo (Embassy)
Ethiopia	Addis Ababa (Embassy)	Addis Ababa (Embassy)		Addis Ababa (Embassy)	Addis Ababa (Embassy)
Ghana	Accra (Embassy)			Accra (Embassy)	
Kenya	Nairobi (Embassy)	Nairobi (Embassy)		Nairobi (Embassy)	Nairobi (Embassy)
Liberia					
Malawi			Lilongwe (Embassy)	Lilongwe (Embassy)	
Morocco	Rabat (Embassy)	Rabat (Embassy)		Rabat (Embassy)	Rabat (Embassy)
Mozambique		Maputo (Embassy)		Maputo (Embassy)	Maputo (Embassy)
Namibia		Windhoek (Embassy)			
Nigeria	Abuja (Embassy); Lagos (Consulate-General)	Abuja (Embassy)		Abuja (Embassy)	Abuja (Embassy)
Rwanda	Kigali (Embassy)				Kigali (Embassy)
Senegal	Dakar (Embassy)	Dakar (Embassy)		Dakar (Embassy)	Dakar (Embassy)
Sierra Leone			Freetown (Embassy)		
Somaliland	Hargeisa (Representative office)				
South Africa	Pretoria (Embassy)	Pretoria (Embassy)		Pretoria (Embassy)	Pretoria (Embassy)
South Sudan				Juba (Embassy)	
Sudan				Khartoum (Embassy)	Khartoum (Embassy)
Tanzania	Dar es Salaam (Embassy)	Dar es Salaam (Embassy)		Dar es Salaam (Embassy)	Dar es Salaam (Embassy)
Tunisia	Tunis (Embassy)	Tunis (Embassy)			Tunis (Embassy)
Uganda	Kampala (Embassy)		Kampala (Embassy)		Kampala (Embassy)
Zambia		Lusaka (Embassy)			Lusaka (Embassy)
Zimbabwe					

== Americas ==
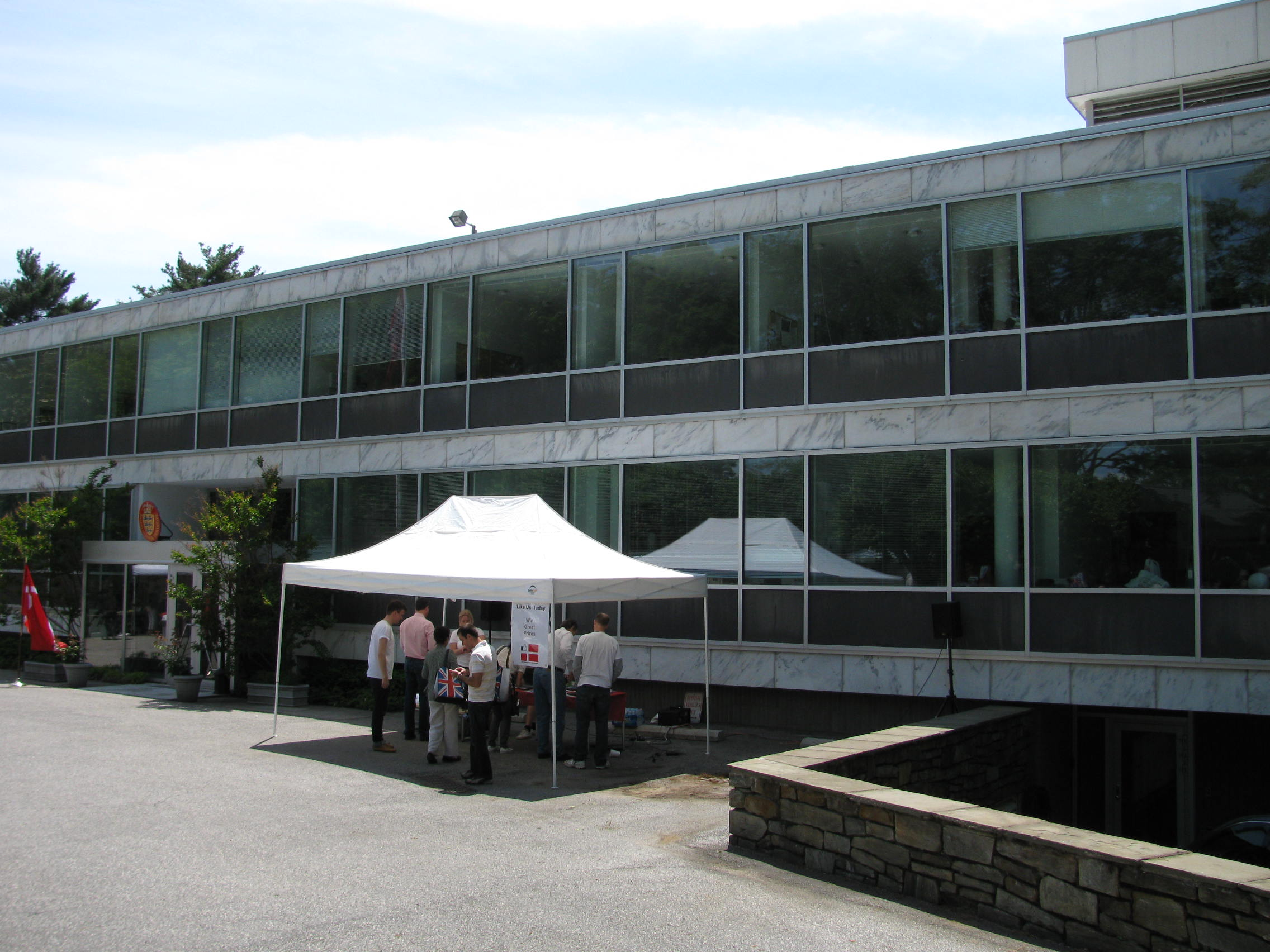
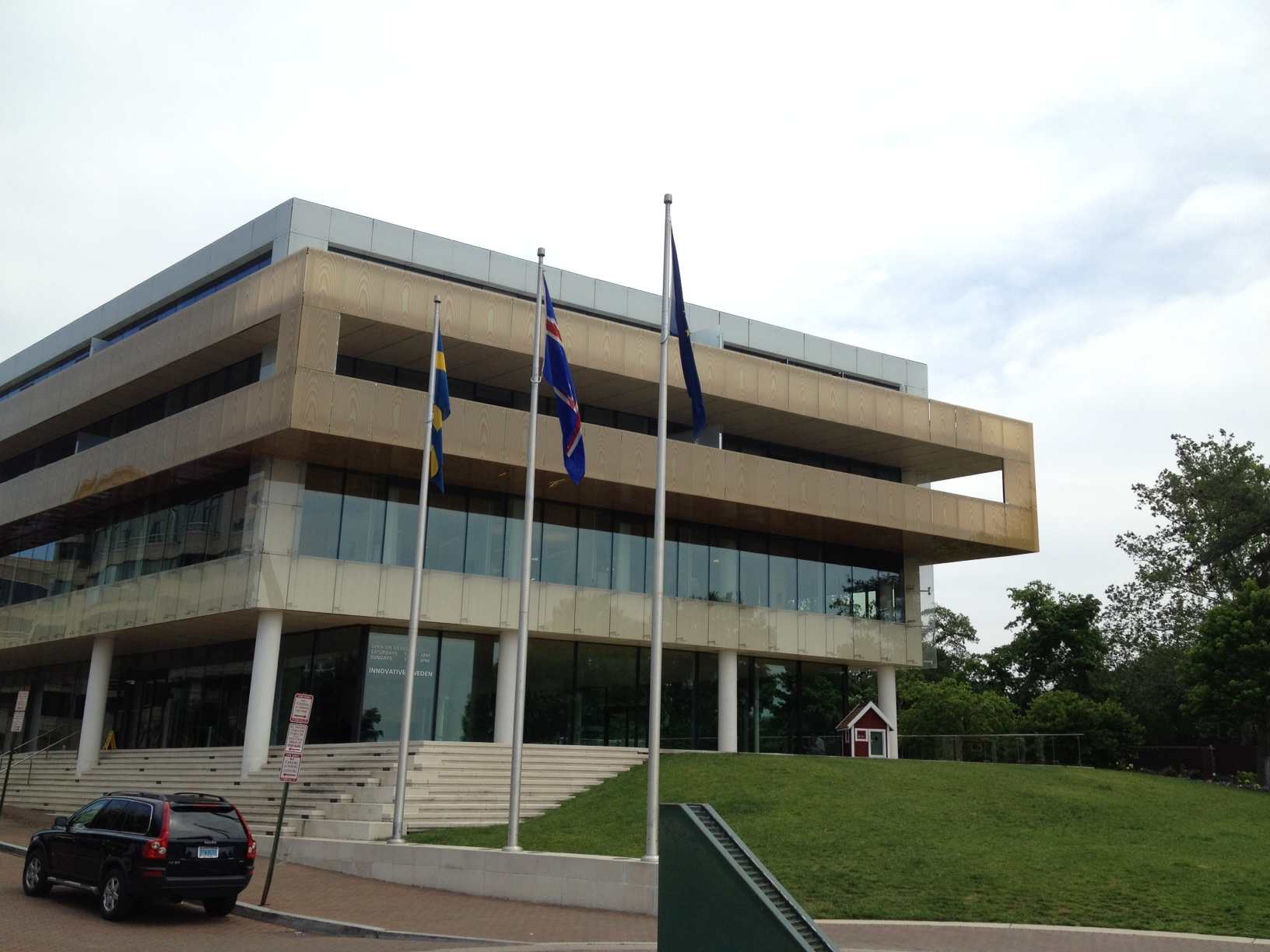
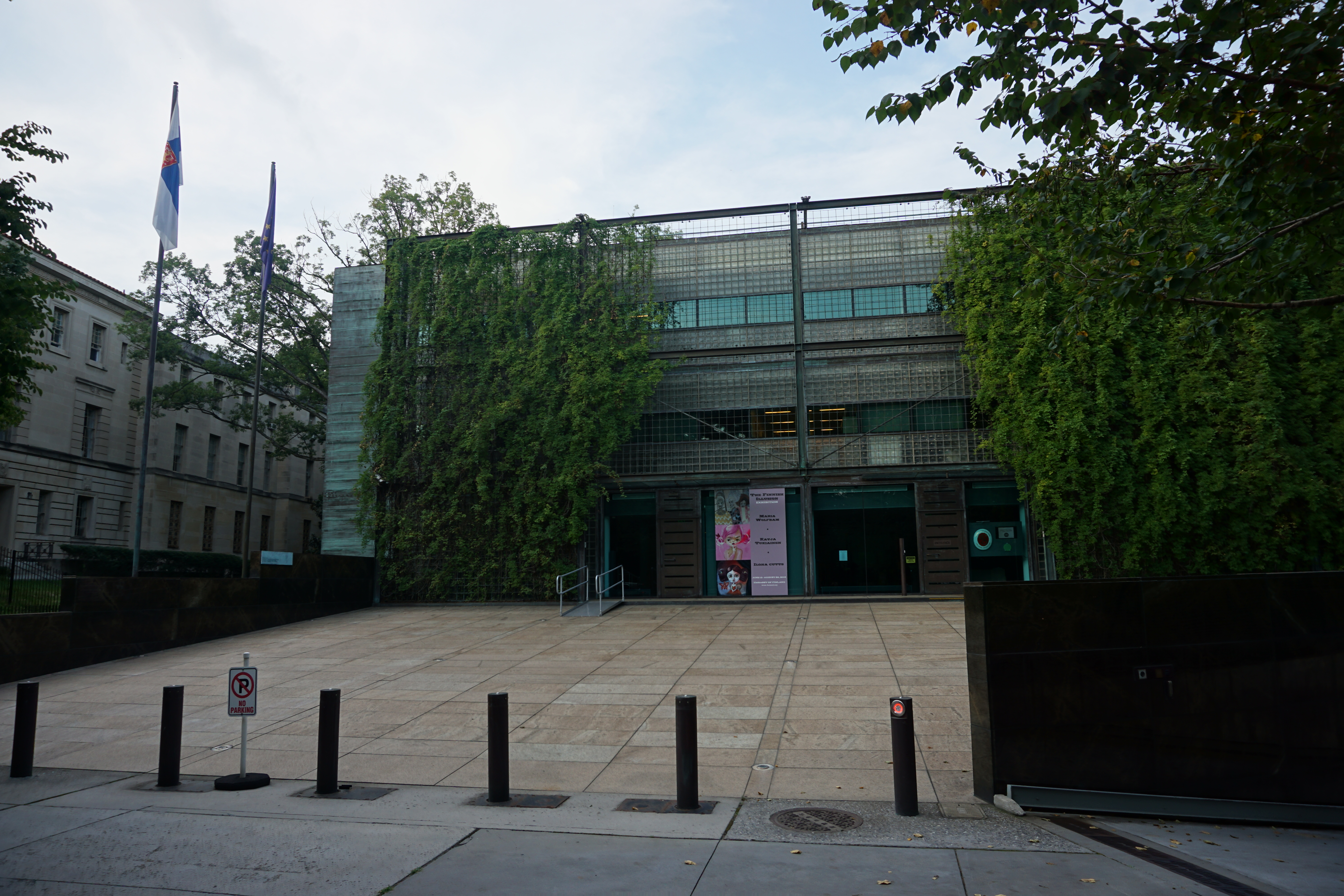
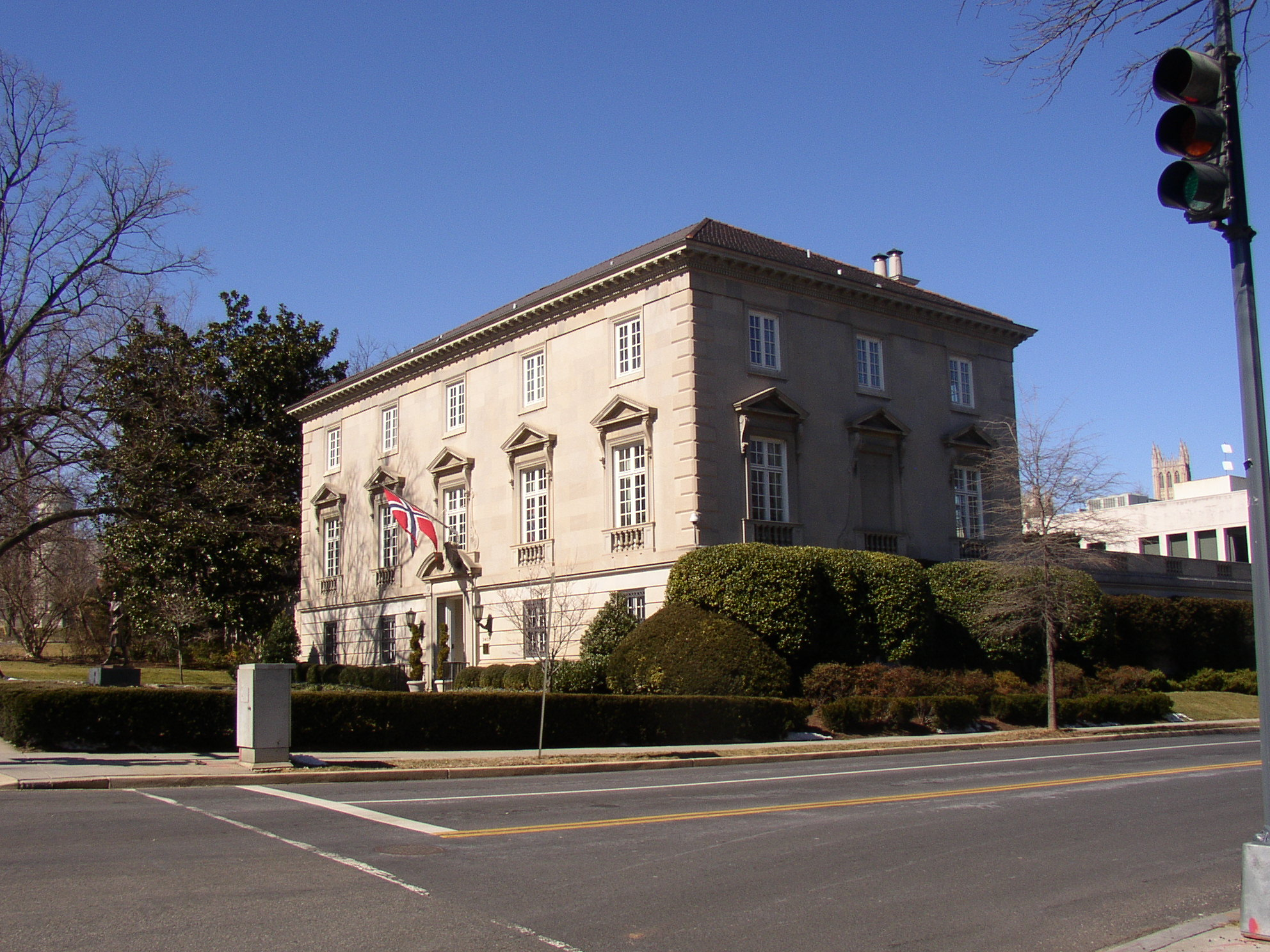
The Nordic Embassies in Washington, D.C.

	Denmark	Finland	Iceland	Norway	Sweden	Greenland
Argentina	Buenos Aires (Embassy)	Buenos Aires (Embassy)		Buenos Aires (Embassy)	Buenos Aires (Embassy)	
Bolivia						
Brazil	Brasília (Embassy); São Paulo (Consulate-General)	Brasília (Embassy); São Paulo (Consulate)		Brasília (Embassy); Rio de Janeiro (Consulate-General)	Brasília (Embassy)	
Canada	Ottawa (Embassy); Toronto (Consulate-General)	Ottawa (Embassy)	Ottawa (Embassy); Winnipeg (Consulate-General)	Ottawa (Embassy)	Ottawa (Embassy)	
Chile	Santiago de Chile (Embassy)	Santiago de Chile (Embassy)		Santiago de Chile (Embassy)	Santiago de Chile (Embassy)	
Colombia	Bogotá (Embassy)	Bogotá (Embassy)		Bogotá (Embassy)	Bogotá (Embassy)	
Cuba				Havana (Embassy)	Havana (Embassy)	
Guatemala					Guatemala City (Embassy)	
Mexico	Mexico City (Embassy)	Mexico City (Embassy)		Mexico City (Embassy)	Mexico City (Embassy)	
Peru		Lima (Embassy)			Lima (Embassy)	
United States	Washington, D.C. (Embassy); Chicago (Consulate-General); Houston (Consulate-General); New York City (Consulate-General); Palo Alto (Consulate-General & Silicon Valley Innovation Centre)	Washington, D.C. (Embassy); Houston (Consulate-General); Los Angeles (Consulate-General); New York City (Consulate-General)	Washington, D.C. (Embassy)	Washington, D.C. (Embassy); New York City (Consulate-General); San Francisco (Consulate-General)	Washington, D.C. (Embassy); Houston (Consulate-General); New York City (Consulate-General); San Francisco (Consulate-General)	Washington, D.C. (Representative Office)
Greenland	Nuuk (High Commission)		Nuuk (Consulate-General)			

= Part of the Nordics

== Asia ==
	Denmark	Finland	Iceland	Norway	Sweden
Afghanistan	Kabul (Embassy)				
Armenia					Yerevan (Embassy)
Azerbaijan					Baku (Embassy)
Bangladesh	Dhaka (Embassy)			Dhaka (Embassy)	Dhaka (Embassy)
Bhutan	Thimphu (Representative office)				
Cambodia	Phnom Penh (Representative Office)				
China	Beijing (Embassy); Guangzhou (Consulate General); Shanghai (Consulate General)	Beijing (Embassy); Hong Kong (Consulate General); Shanghai (Consulate General)	Beijing (Embassy)	Beijing (Embassy); Guangzhou (Consulate General); Shanghai (Consulate General)	Beijing (Embassy); Hong Kong (Consulate General); Shanghai (Consulate General)
Georgia	Tbilisi (Embassy)			Tbilisi (Embassy)	Tbilisi (Embassy)
India	New Delhi (Embassy)	New Delhi (Embassy): Mumbai (Consulate General)	New Delhi (Embassy)	New Delhi (Embassy): Mumbai (Consulate General)	New Delhi (Embassy): Mumbai (Consulate General)
Indonesia	Jakarta (Embassy)	Jakarta (Embassy)		Jakarta (Embassy)	Jakarta (Embassy)
Iran	Tehran (Embassy)	Tehran (Embassy)		Tehran (Embassy)	Tehran (Embassy)
Iraq		Baghdad (Embassy)			Baghdad (Embassy)
Israel	Tel Aviv (Embassy)	Tel Aviv (Embassy)		Tel Aviv (Embassy)	Tel Aviv (Embassy); Jerusalem (Consulate General)
Japan	Tokyo (Embassy)	Tokyo (Embassy)	Tokyo (Embassy)	Tokyo (Embassy)	Tokyo (Embassy)
Jordan				Amman (Embassy)	Amman (Embassy)
Kazakhstan		Astana (Embassy)			Astana (Embassy)
Lebanon	Beirut (Embassy)	Beirut (Embassy)		Beirut (Embassy)	Beirut (Embassy)
Malaysia		Kuala Lumpur (Embassy)		Kuala Lumpur (Embassy)	Kuala Lumpur (Embassy)
Myanmar	Yangon (Embassy)	Yangon (Embassy)		Yangon (Embassy)	
Nepal		Kathmandu (Embassy)		Kathmandu (Embassy)	
North Korea					Pyongyang (Embassy)
Pakistan	Islamabad (Embassy)	Islamabad (Embassy)		Islamabad (Embassy)	Islamabad (Embassy)
Palestine	Ramallah (Representative Office)	Ramallah (Representative Office)		Ramallah (Representative Office)	
Philippines	Manila (Embassy)	Manila (Embassy)		Manila (Embassy)	Manila (Embassy)
Qatar		Doha (Embassy)		Doha (Embassy)	Doha (Embassy)
Saudi Arabia	Riyadh (Embassy)	Riyadh (Embassy)		Riyadh (Embassy); Jeddah (Consulate General)	Riyadh (Embassy)
Singapore	Singapore (Embassy)	Singapore (Embassy)		Singapore (Embassy)	Singapore (Embassy)
South Korea	Seoul (Embassy)	Seoul (Embassy)		Seoul (Embassy)	Seoul (Embassy)
Sri Lanka				Colombo (Embassy)	
Syria					Damascus (Embassy)
Taiwan	Taipei (Trade Council of Denmark, Taipei)	Taipei (Finland Trade Centre)			Taipei (Swedish Trade and Invest Council)
Thailand	Bangkok (Embassy)	Bangkok (Embassy)		Bangkok (Embassy)	Bangkok (Embassy)
Turkey	Ankara (Embassy); Istanbul (Consulate General)	Ankara (Embassy)		Ankara (Embassy); Istanbul (Consulate General)	Ankara (Embassy); Istanbul (Consulate General)
United Arab Emirates	Abu Dhabi (Embassy)	Abu Dhabi (Embassy)		Abu Dhabi (Embassy)	Abu Dhabi (Embassy)
Vietnam	Hanoi (Embassy)	Hanoi (Embassy)		Hanoi (Embassy)	Hanoi (Embassy)
Hong Kong		Hong Kong (Consulate-General)			Hong Kong (Consulate General)

== Europe ==
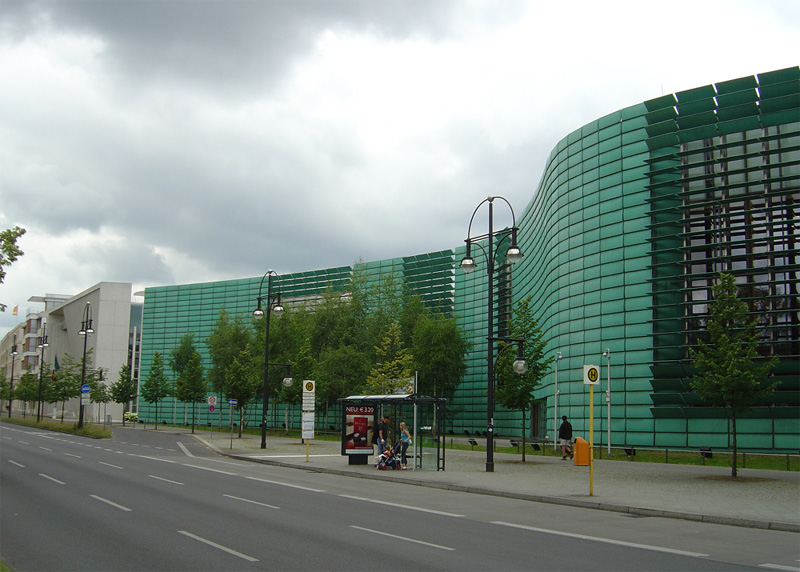
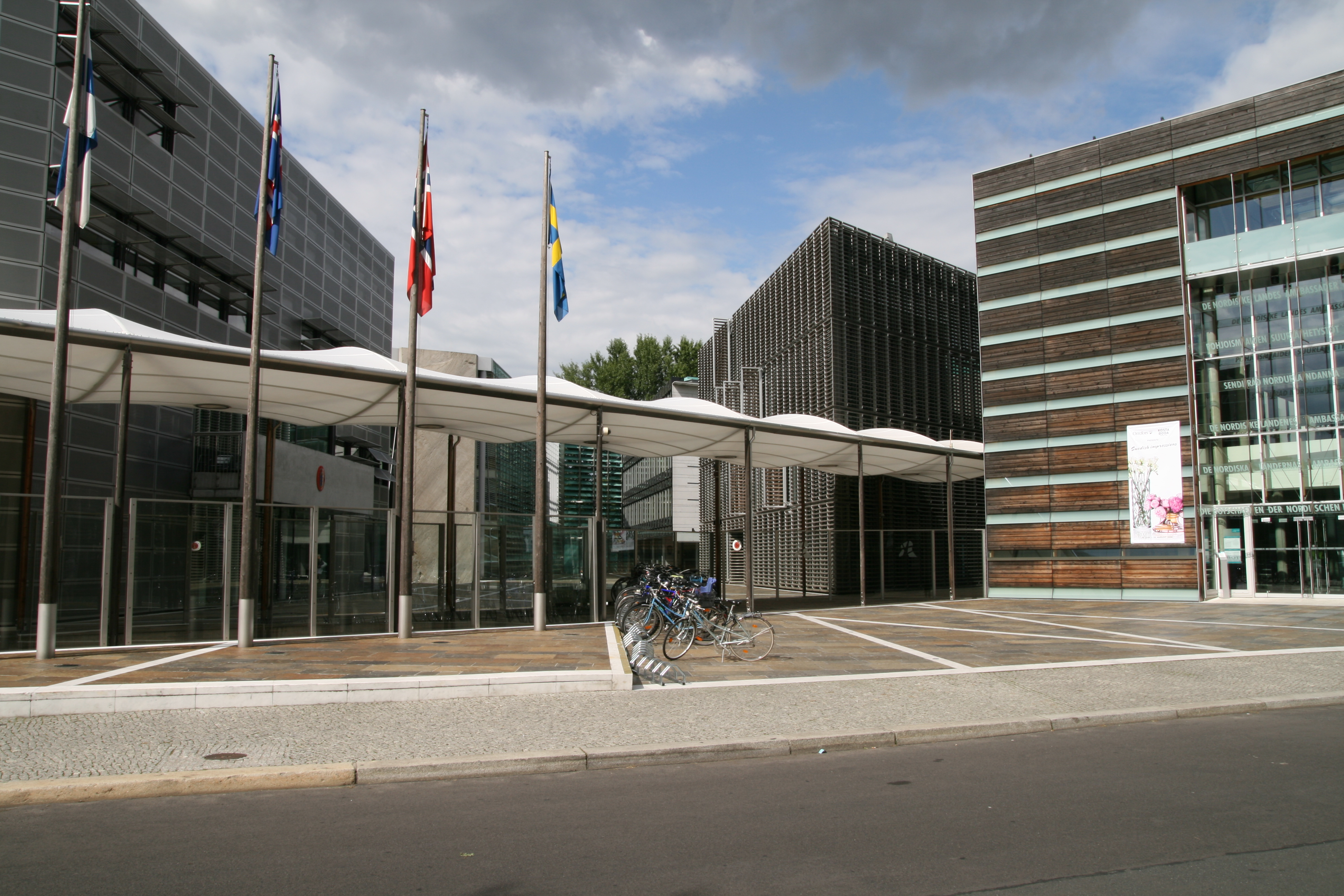
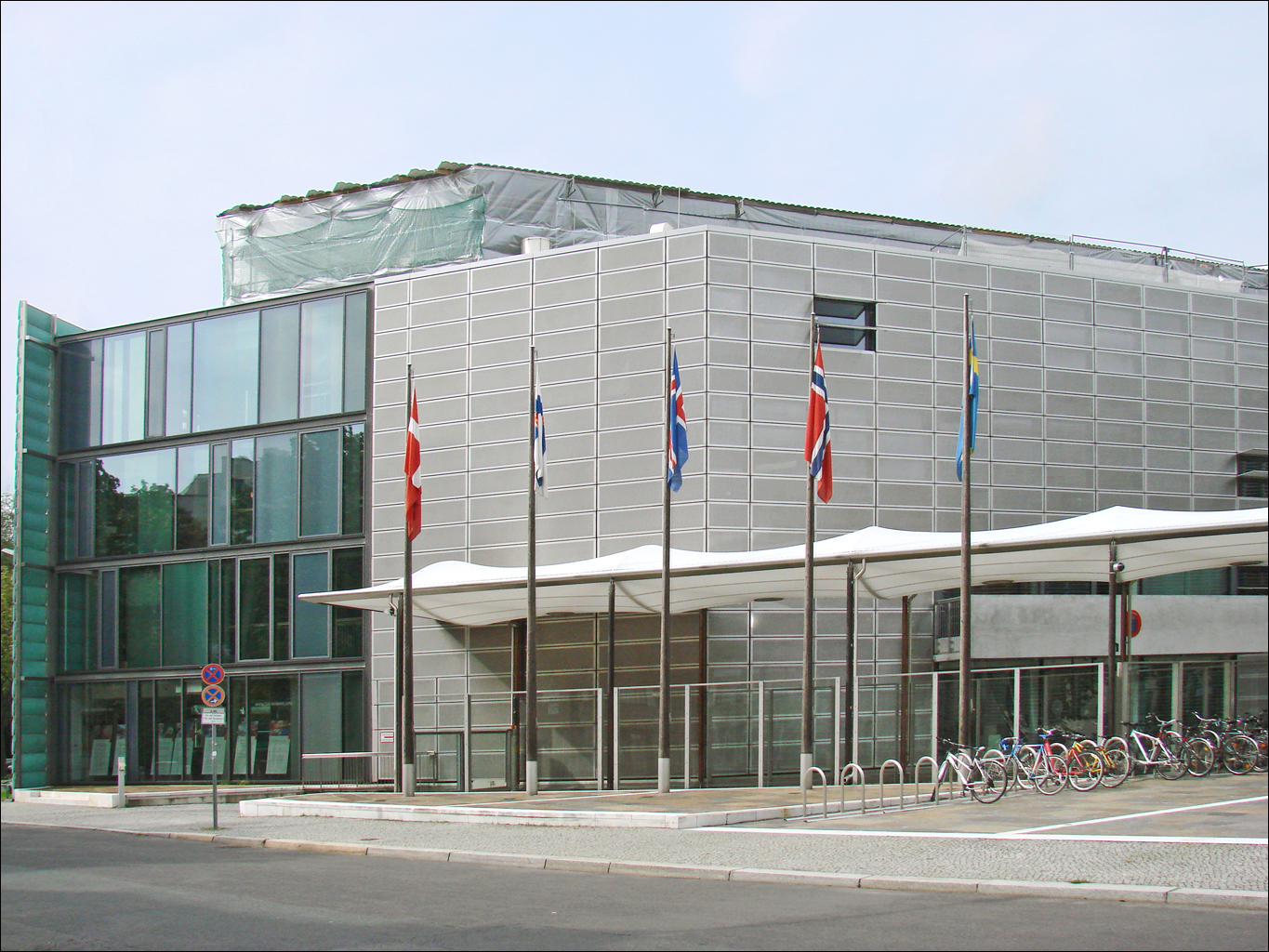
The Nordic Embassies in Berlin
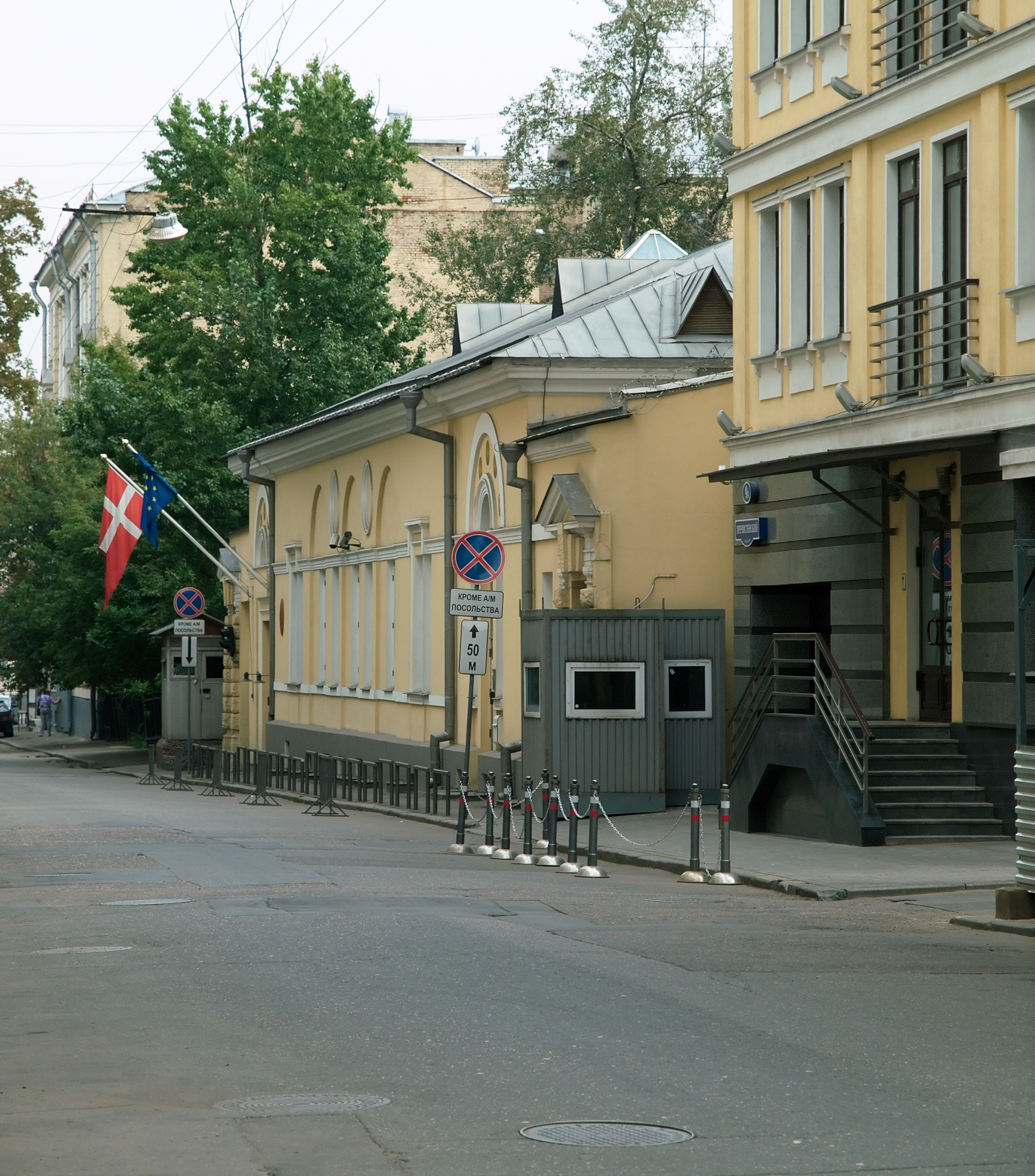
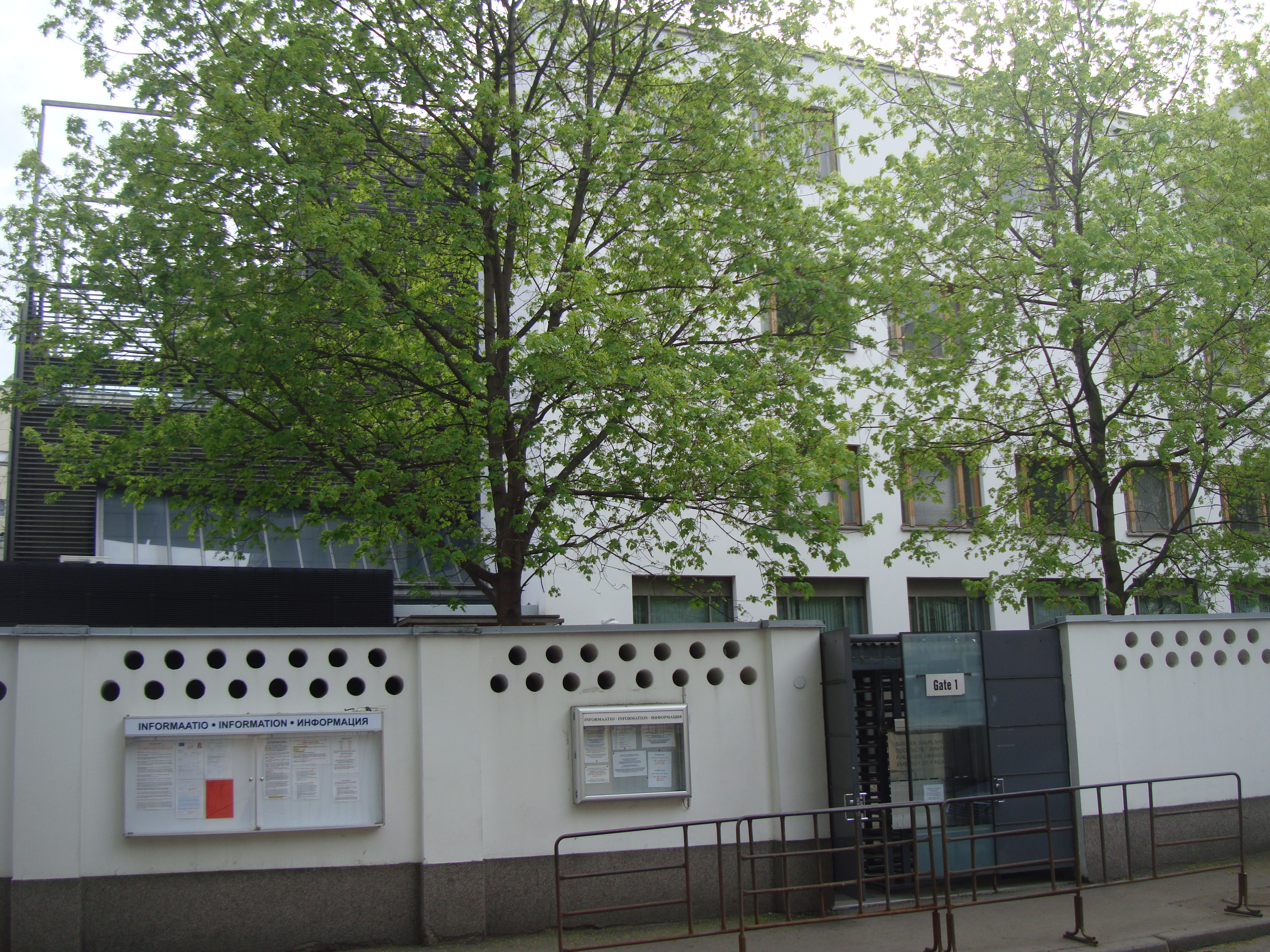
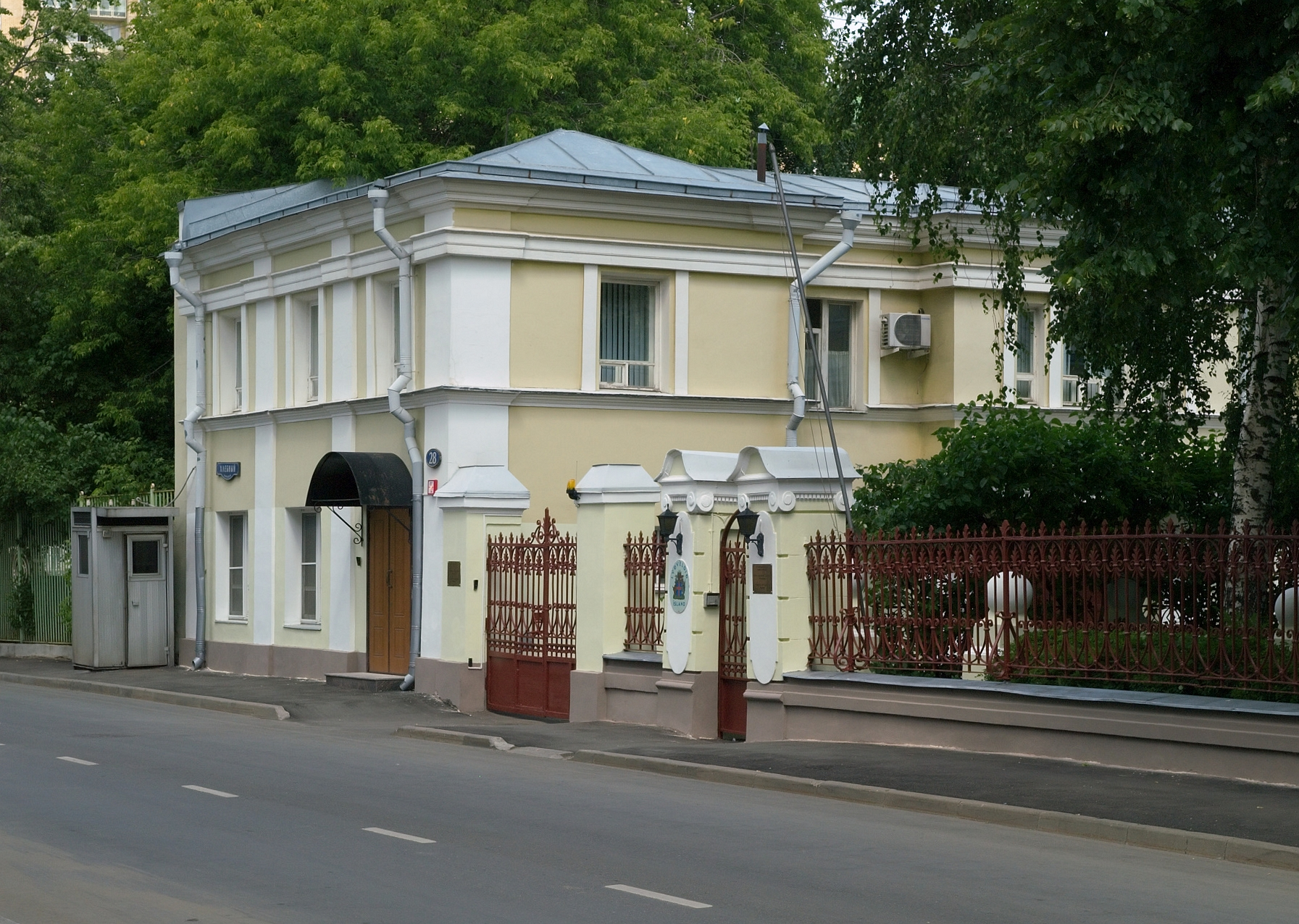
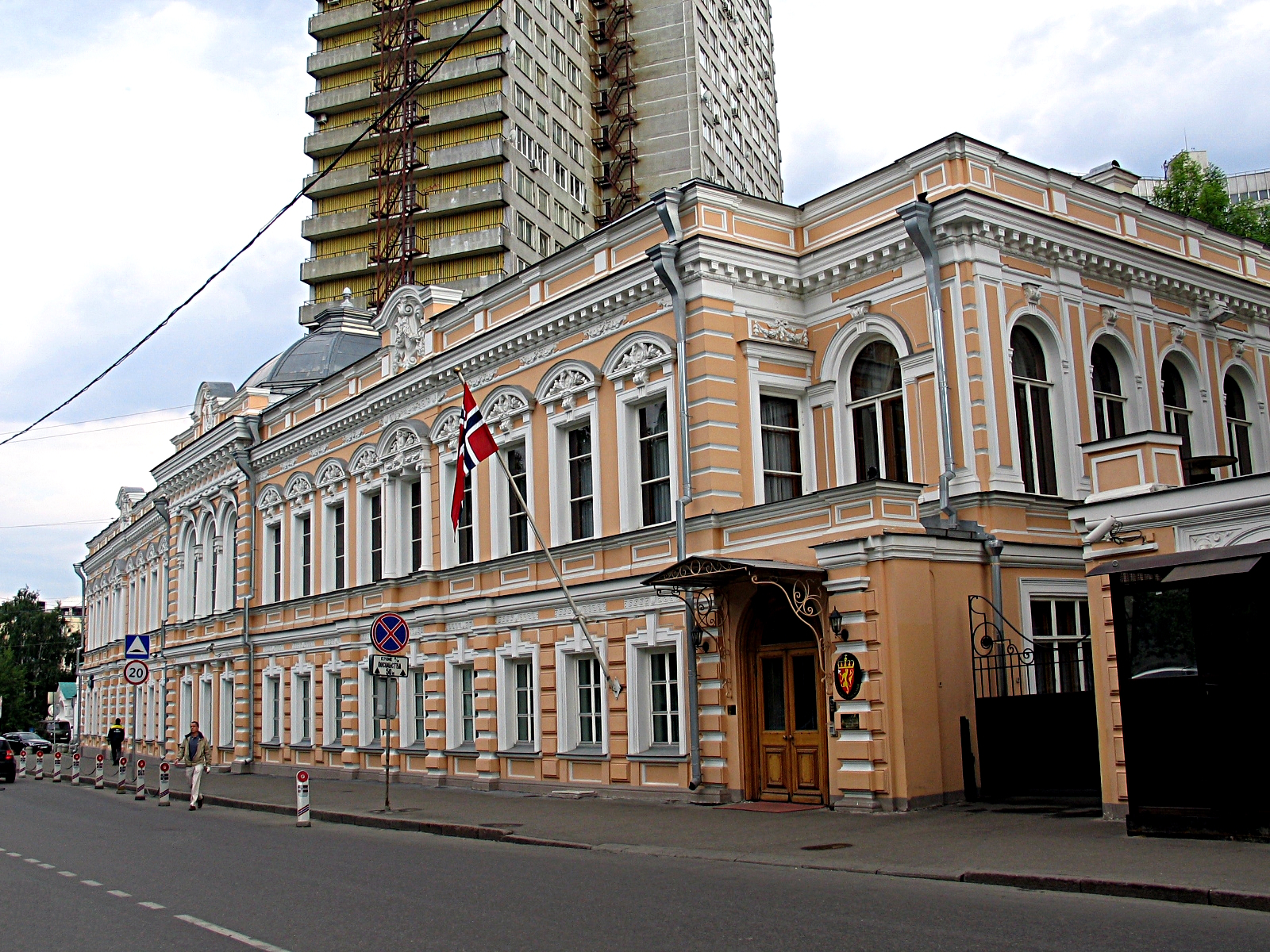
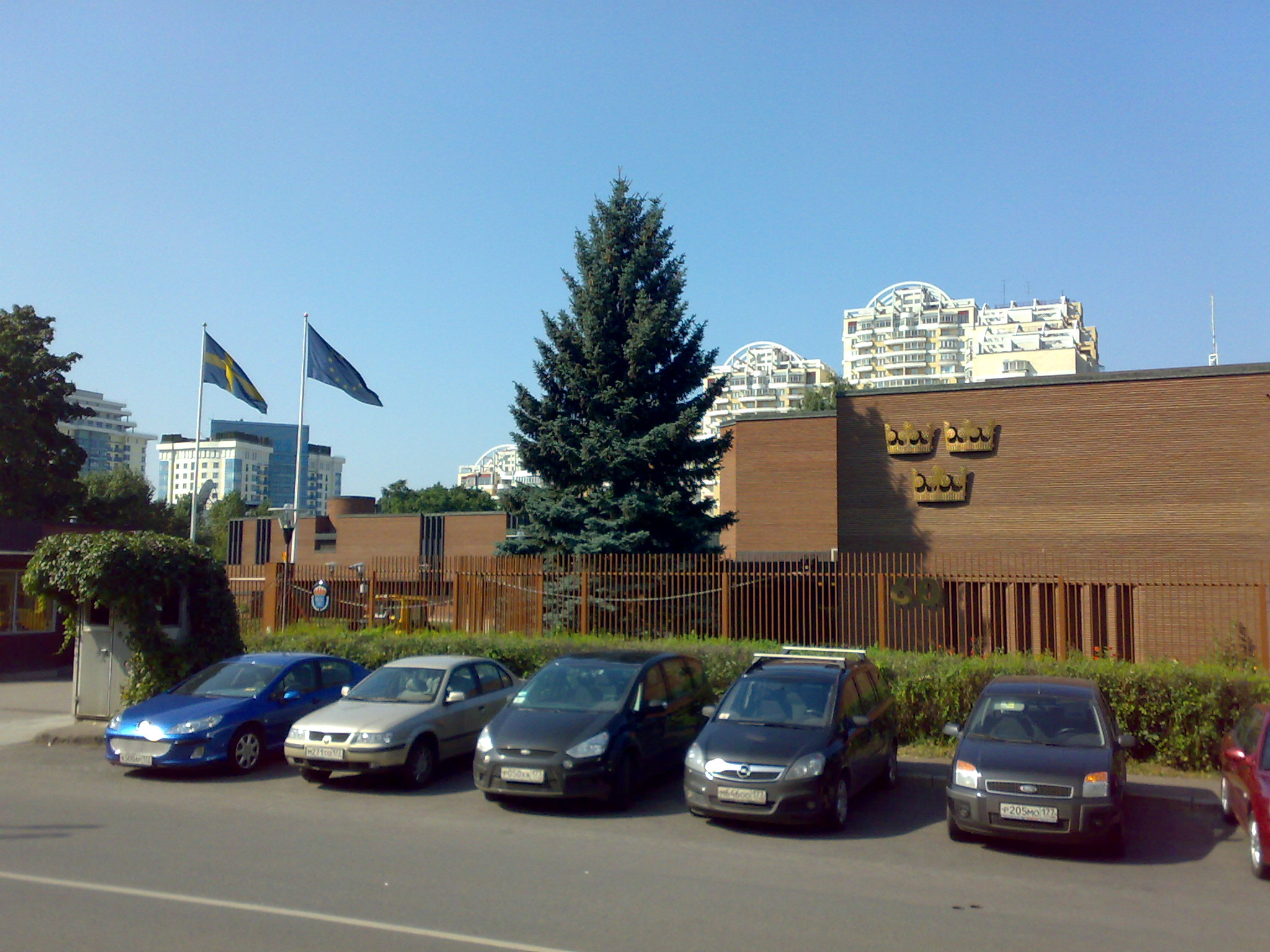
The Nordic Embassies in Moscow

	Denmark	Finland	Iceland	Norway	Sweden	Faroe Islands	Greenland
Albania					Tirana (Embassy)		
Austria	Vienna (Embassy)	Vienna (Embassy)	Vienna (Embassy)	Vienna (Embassy)	Vienna (Embassy)		
Belarus		Minsk (Liaison Office)			Minsk (Embassy)		
Belgium	Brussels (Embassy)	Brussels (Embassy)	Brussels (Embassy)	Brussels (Embassy)	Brussels (Embassy)	Brussels (Representative Office	Brussels (Representative Office)
Bosnia and Herzegovina				Sarajevo (Embassy)	Sarajevo (Embassy)		
Bulgaria	Sofia (Embassy)	Sofia (Embassy)					
Croatia	Zagreb (Embassy)	Zagreb (Embassy)		Zagreb (Embassy)	Zagreb (Embassy)		
Cyprus		Nicosia (Embassy)			Nicosia (Embassy)		
Czech Republic	Prague (Embassy)	Prague (Embassy)		Prague (Embassy)	Prague (Embassy)		
Denmark		Copenhagen (Embassy)	Copenhagen (Embassy)	Copenhagen (Embassy)	Copenhagen (Embassy)	Copenhagen (Representative Office)	Copenhagen (Representative Office)
Estonia	Tallinn (Embassy)	Tallinn (Embassy)		Tallinn (Embassy)	Tallinn (Embassy)		
Finland	Helsinki (Embassy)		Helsinki (Embassy)	Helsinki (Embassy)	Helsinki (Embassy)		
France	Paris (Embassy)	Paris (Embassy)	Paris (Embassy)	Paris (Embassy)	Paris (Embassy)		
Germany	Berlin (Embassy); Flensburg (Consulate General); Hamburg (Consulate General); Munich (Consulate General)	Berlin (Embassy)	Berlin (Embassy)	Berlin (Embassy); Düsseldorf (Consulate)	Berlin (Embassy)		
Greece	Athens (Embassy)	Athens (Embassy)		Athens (Embassy)	Athens (Embassy)		
Holy See					Stockholm (Embassy) (Note: The Swedish Embassy to the Holy See is located in Stockholm, Sweden. There is a Swedish chancery of the Holy See in Rome, outside Vatican territory.); Rome (Chancery)		
Hungary	Budapest (Embassy)	Budapest (Embassy)		Budapest (Embassy)	Budapest (Embassy)		
Iceland	Reykjavík (Embassy)	Reykjavík (Embassy)		Reykjavík (Embassy)	Reykjavík (Embassy)	Reykjavík (Representative Office)	Reykjavík (Representative Office)
Ireland	Dublin (Embassy)	Dublin (Embassy)		Dublin (Embassy)	Dublin (Embassy)		
Italy	Rome (Embassy)	Rome (Embassy)	Rome (Embassy)	Rome (Embassy)	Rome (Embassy)		
Kosovo		Pristina (Embassy)		Pristina (Embassy)	Pristina (Embassy)		
Latvia	Riga (Embassy)	Riga (Embassy)		Riga (Embassy)	Riga (Embassy)		
Lithuania	Vilnius (Embassy)	Vilnius (Embassy)		Vilnius (Embassy)	Vilnius (Embassy)		
Moldova					Chişinău (Embassy)		
Netherlands	The Hague (Embassy)	The Hague (Embassy)		The Hague (Embassy); Rotterdam (Consulate-General)	The Hague (Embassy)		
North Macedonia					Skopje (Embassy)		
Norway	Oslo (Embassy)	Oslo (Embassy)	Oslo (Embassy)		Oslo (Embassy)		
Poland	Warsaw (Embassy)	Warsaw (Embassy)	Warsaw (Embassy)	Warsaw (Embassy)	Warsaw (Embassy)		
Portugal	Lisbon (Embassy)	Lisbon (Embassy)		Lisbon (Embassy)	Lisbon (Embassy)		
Romania	Bucharest (Embassy)	Bucharest (Embassy)		Bucharest (Embassy)	Bucharest (Embassy)		
Russia	Moscow (Embassy)	Moscow (Embassy); Saint Petersburg (Consulate-General)		Moscow (Embassy); Saint Petersburg (Consulate-General)	Moscow (Embassy)	Moscow (Representative Office)	
Serbia	Belgrade (Embassy)	Belgrade (Embassy)		Belgrade (Embassy)	Belgrade (Embassy)		
Slovakia				Bratislava (Embassy)			
Spain	Madrid (Embassy)	Madrid (Embassy)	Madrid (Embassy)	Madrid (Embassy); Barcelona (Consulate General)	Madrid (Embassy)		
Sweden	Stockholm (Embassy)	Stockholm (Embassy)	Stockholm (Embassy)	Stockholm (Embassy)			
Switzerland		Bern (Embassy)		Bern (Embassy); Geneva (Consulate General)	Bern (Embassy)		
Ukraine	Kyiv (Embassy)	Kyiv (Embassy)		Kyiv (Embassy)	Kyiv (Embassy)		
United Kingdom	London (Embassy)	London (Embassy)	London (Embassy)	London (Embassy)	London (Embassy)	London (Representative Office)	
Åland					Mariehamn (Consulate General)		
Faroe Islands	Tórshavn (High Commission)		Tórshavn (Consulate General)				

= Part of the Nordics

== Oceania ==
	Denmark	Finland	Iceland	Norway	Sweden
Australia	Canberra (Embassy); Sydney (Consulate General)	Canberra (Embassy); Sydney (Consulate)		Canberra (Embassy)	Canberra (Embassy)

== Multilateral organizations ==
	Denmark	Finland	Iceland	Norway	Sweden	Faroe Islands	Greenland
African Union				Addis Ababa (Permanent Delegation)			
Comprehensive Nuclear-Test-Ban Treaty Organization	Vienna		Vienna				
Council of Europe	Strasbourg (Permanent Representation)	Strasbourg (Permanent Representation)	Strasbourg (Permanent Representation)	Strasbourg	Strasbourg		
EFTA			Geneva	Geneva (Delegation)			
EU	Brussels (Permanent Representation)	Brussels (Permanent Representation)		Brussels	Brussels (Permanent Representation)	Brussels	Brussels
Food and Agriculture Organization (Note: Sending country's mission to FAO is also accredited to the International Fund for Agricultural Development and World Food Programme)			Rome (Permanent Mission)	Rome (Permanent Mission)			
International Atomic Energy Agency	Vienna		Vienna				
NATO		Brussels	Brussels	Brussels (Permanent Delegation)	Brussels		
Organisation for Economic Co-operation and Development	Paris	Paris		Paris	Paris		
Organization for Security and Co-operation in Europe	Vienna		Vienna	Vienna	Vienna		
UNESCO				Paris	Paris		
United Nations	New York; Geneva; Vienna	New York; Geneva	New York; Geneva; Vienna	New York; Geneva	New York; Geneva		
WTO		Geneva	Geneva				

== Nordic Council of Ministers' Offices ==
The Nordic Council of Ministers is the official body for inter-governmental co-operation. The Council of Ministers has offices in the following countries:

	Nordic Council of Ministers
Denmark	Copenhagen (Secretariat)
Estonia	Tallinn (Head office); Tartu (Branch office); Narva (Branch office)
Latvia	Riga
Lithuania	Vilnius

Closed offices

Russia	St. Petersburg (Office); Kaliningrad (Office); Petrozavodsk (Contact center); Arkhangelsk (Contact center); Murmansk (Information center)

= Part of the Nordics

== See also ==
- List of diplomatic missions of Denmark
- List of diplomatic missions of Finland
- List of diplomatic missions of Iceland
- List of diplomatic missions of Norway
- List of diplomatic missions of Sweden
- Foreign relations of Denmark
- Foreign relations of Finland
- Foreign relations of Iceland
- Foreign relations of Norway
- Foreign relations of Sweden
- Ministry of Foreign Affairs (Denmark)
- Ministry for Foreign Affairs (Finland)
- Ministry for Foreign Affairs (Iceland)
- Ministry of Foreign Affairs (Norway)
- Ministry for Foreign Affairs (Sweden)
