= Nordic Embassies (Berlin) =

Diplomatic missions of the Nordic countries to Germany, located in Berlin

Nordic Embassies, Berlin Denmark Finland Iceland Norway Sweden
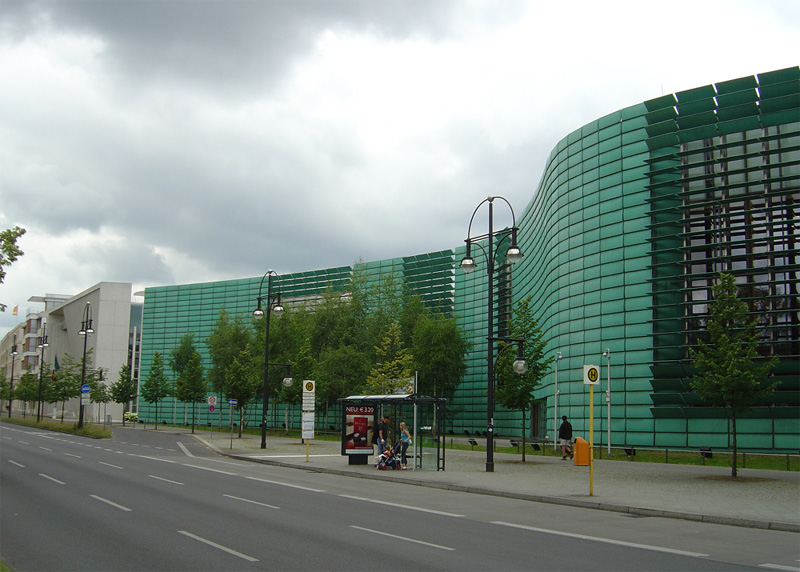
- Location: Berlin
- Address: Rauchstraße 1
- Coordinates: 52°30′31″N 13°21′02″E

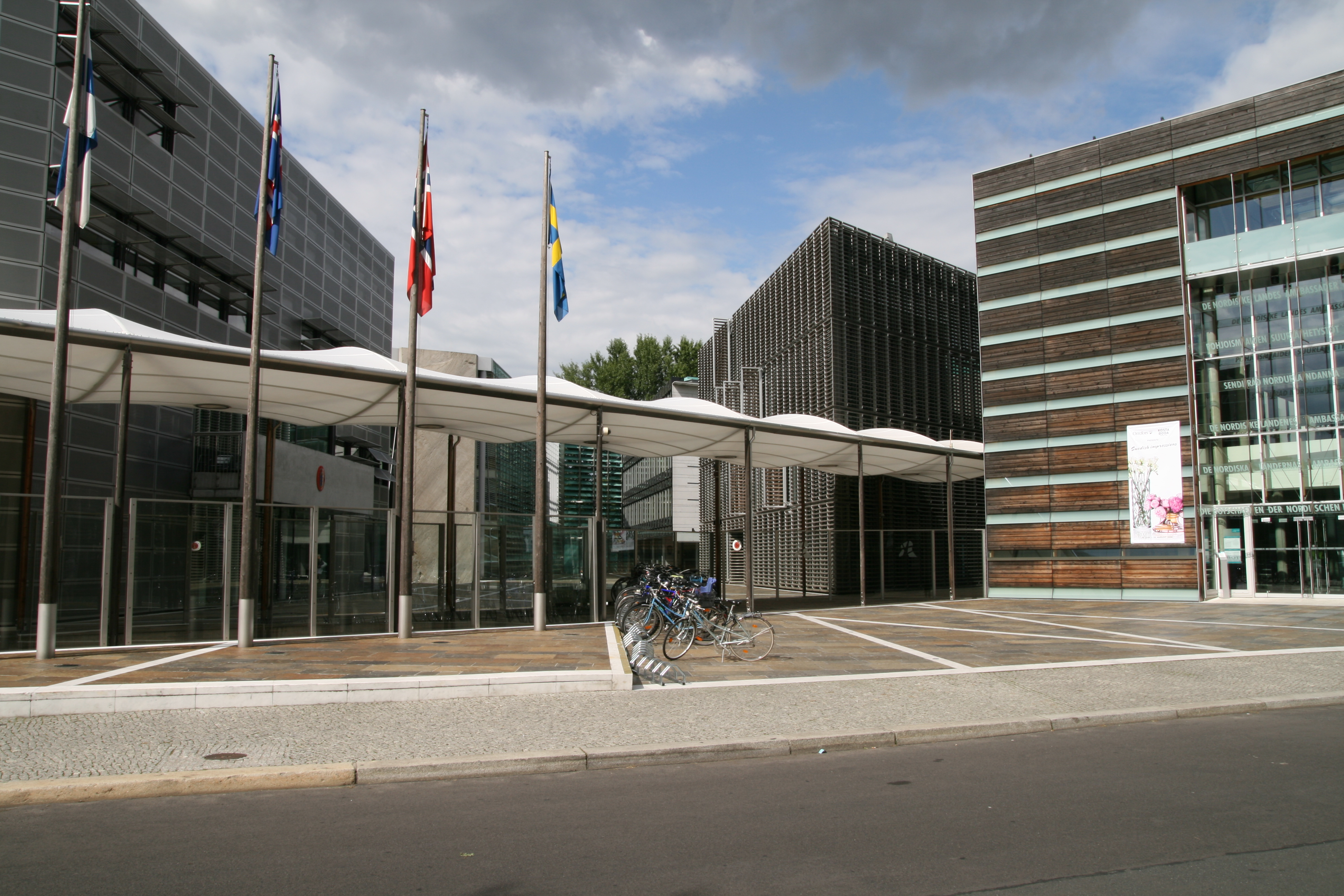
Nordic Embassies behind the copper facade

The Nordic Embassies in Berlin are the diplomatic missions of the Nordic countries to Germany, located in a common building complex, the Pan Nordic Building. The building complex was designed by the architects Alfred Berger and Tiina Parkkinen and completed in 1999.

The building comprises six individual buildings enveloped by a green, copper clad, snaking wall. Of the six buildings five are the embassies of Denmark, Iceland, Norway, Sweden and Finland, arranged geographically. The remaining building is a communal building called the Felleshus, which includes the entrance to the complex, an auditorium and a canteen.

Architects:

- Complex and Felleshus (communal space) - Berger and Parkkinen
- Denmark - 3XN
- Iceland - PK Hönnun
- Norway - Snøhetta
- Sweden - Wingårdh Arkitektkontor
- Finland - Viiva Arkkitehtuuri Oy

== See also ==
- List of diplomatic missions of the Nordic countries
