= Embassy of Iceland, London =

Embassy of Iceland in London
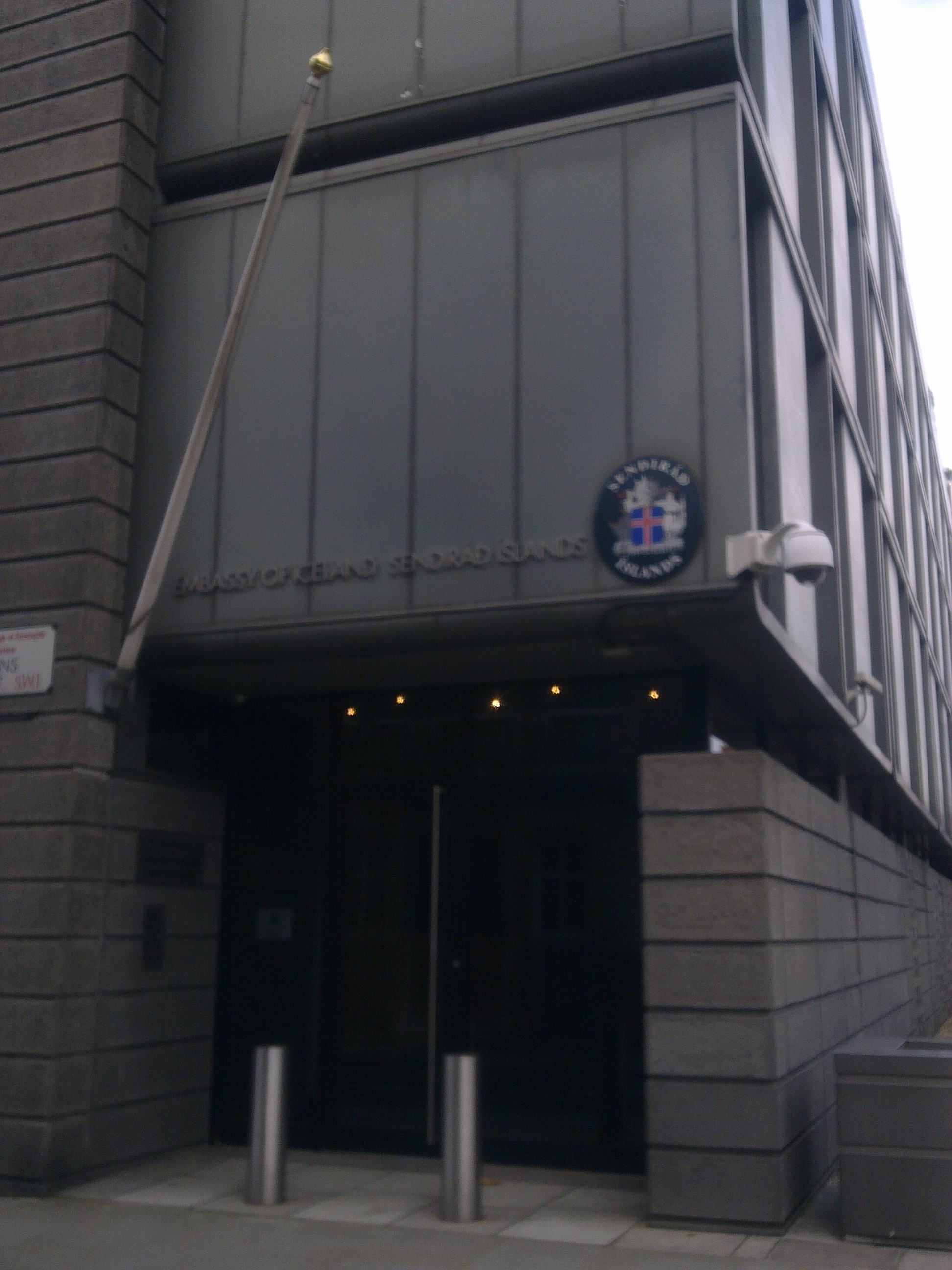
- Location: Knightsbridge, London
- Address: 2A Hans Street, London, SW1X 0JE
- Coordinates: 51.4978°N 0.1594°W
- Ambassador: Sturla Sigurjónsson

The Embassy of Iceland in London is the diplomatic mission of Iceland in the United Kingdom. It occupies a large, modern building designed by Danish architect Arne Jacobsen which it shares with the Embassy of Denmark, completed in 1977. There has been an Icelandic embassy in the UK since 1940.

== Gallery ==
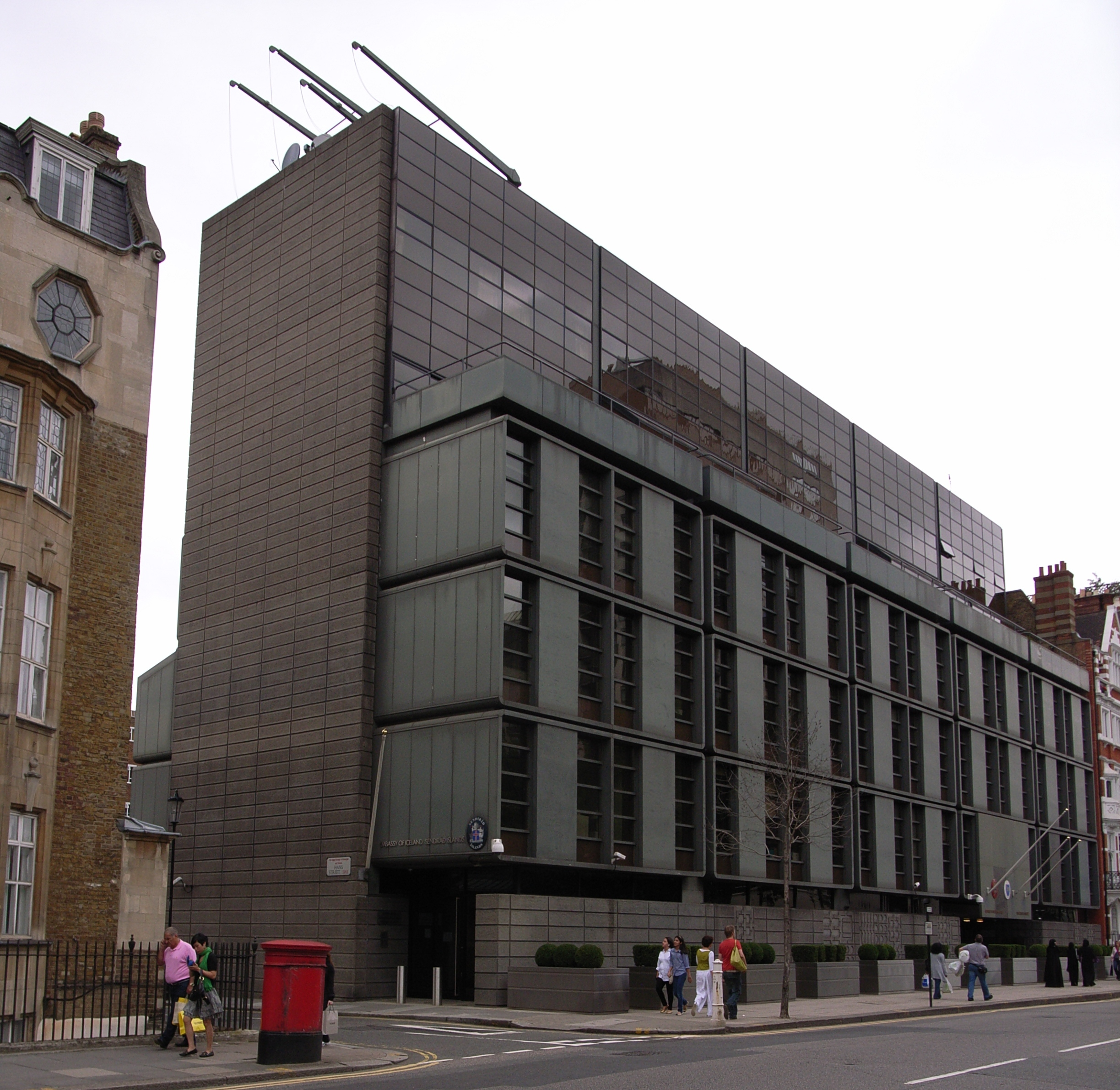
The embassy

== See also ==
- Ambassador of Iceland to the United Kingdom
