= List of ambassadors of Sweden to Hungary =

Ambassador of Sweden to Hungary
- Lesser coat of arms of the Kingdom of Sweden
- Incumbent; Diana Madunic since August 2023
- Ministry for Foreign Affairs; Swedish Embassy, Budapest
- Style: His or Her Excellency (formal); Mr. or Madam Ambassador (informal)
- Reports to: Minister for Foreign Affairs
- Residence: Diana utca 16/c, Istenhegy
- Seat: Budapest, Hungary
- Appointer: Government of Sweden
- Term length: No fixed term
- Formation: 1920
- First holder: Oskar Ewerlöf
- Website: Swedish Embassy, Budapest

The Ambassador of Sweden to Hungary (known formally as the Ambassador of the Kingdom of Sweden to Hungary) is the official representative of the government of Sweden to the president of Hungary and government of Hungary.

== History ==
Sweden and Hungary established diplomatic relations on 12 November 1920. On 16 February 1921, Envoy Oskar Ewerlöf presented his credentials to Miklós Horthy, the Regent of Hungary. The Swedish envoy in Vienna was accredited in Budapest from 1920 to 1924, the Swedish envoy in Bern from 1924 to 1928, and again the Swedish envoy in Vienna from 1928 to 1938.

On 29 April 1938, changes in the Swedish foreign representation were announced. Envoy Torsten Undén, who had previously served as the Swedish envoy in Vienna with accreditation also in Budapest, would now move his residence and the chancery to Budapest. After the end of World War II, a Swedish chargé d'affaires was stationed in Budapest until 1949, when the Swedish envoy in Bucharest was accredited to Budapest.

In January 1951, it was reported that the position of head of mission in Bucharest would be discontinued, which was also accredited to Budapest. The responsibility for Sweden's representation in Hungary, Romania, and Bulgaria, would thereafter be divided between Belgrade, Moscow, and Prague, with Sweden being represented in those countries by lower-ranking personnel for the time being. The Swedish envoy in Prague was subsequently accredited to Budapest.

In January 1964, it was proposed that the mission in Budapest should be granted independent status. The same month, the Swedish Ministry for Foreign Affairs announced that an agreement had been reached to elevate both the Swedish legation in Budapest and the Hungarian legation in Stockholm to embassies. The decision to grant the mission in Budapest independent status and have it led by an ambassador was made by parliament in March 1964.

== List of representatives ==
Name	Period	Title	Resident / Concurrent accreditation	Notes	Presented credentials	Ref
Kingdom of Hungary (–1946)
Oskar Ewerlöf	1920–1923	Envoy	Resident in Vienna		16 February 1921	
Ivan Danielsson	1923–1924	Envoy	Resident in Vienna			
Patrik Reuterswärd	28 June 1924 – 1928	Chargé d'affaires	Resident in Vienna			
Jonas Alströmer	27 September 1924 – 1925	Envoy	Resident in Bern			
Einar Hennings	1925–1928	Envoy	Resident in Bern			
Torsten Undén	1928–1938	Envoy	Resident in Vienna		12 October 1928	
Torsten Undén	1938–1942	Envoy	Accredited to Belgrade (until 1939)			
Ivan Danielsson	1942–1945	Envoy				
Rolf Arfwedson	1945–1946	Chargé d'affaires				
Second Hungarian Republic (1946–1949)
Rolf Arfwedson	1946–1949	Chargé d'affaires				
Hungarian People's Republic (1949–1989)
Sven Allard	1949–1954	Envoy	Resident in Bucharest (1949–51) and in Prague (1951–54)			
Carl Olof Gisle	1954–1959	Envoy	Resident in Prague			
Per Bertil Kollberg	19 December 1956 – 13 January 1957	Chargé d'affaires ad interim				
Karl Fredrik Almqvist	1959–1962	Envoy	Resident in Prague			
Carl Kjellberg	1962–1964	Chargé d'affaires ad interim (Note: Held the diplomatic rank of legation councillor.)				
Harry Bagge	1963–1964	Envoy	Resident in Prague			
Torsten Brandel	1964–1969	Ambassador				
Sigge Lilliehöök	1969–1973	Ambassador				
Gustaf Bonde	1973 – 21 September 1977	Ambassador		Died in office		
Torsten Hylander	1978–1981	Ambassador				
Vidar Hellners	1981–1985	Ambassador				
Ragnar Dromberg	1985–1989	Ambassador				
Third Hungarian Republic (1989–present)
Sten Strömholm	1989–1993	Ambassador				
Jan Lundvik	1994–1998	Ambassador	Also accredited to Chișinău (from 1992 (Note: The Consulate General in Berlin, under the leadership of Consul General Jan Lundvik, was given responsibility for relations with Moldova in 1992, and that same year he was accredited there. In 1994, the responsibility for Moldova was transferred to the embassy in Budapest when Jan Lundvik became ambassador there.))			
Staffan Carlsson	1998–2003	Ambassador				
Bengt Lundborg	2003–2006	Ambassador				
Cecilia Björner	2006–2011	Ambassador				
Karin Olofsdotter	2011–2014	Ambassador				
Niclas Trouvé	2014–2019	Ambassador				
Dag Hartelius	2019–2023	Ambassador	Also accredited to Ljubljana (from 2020)			
Diana Madunic	August 2023 – present	Ambassador	Also accredited to Ljubljana (from 22 November 2023)			

== See also ==
- Hungary–Sweden relations
