= List of ambassadors of Sweden to Lithuania =

Ambassador of Sweden to Lithuania
- Lesser coat of arms of the Kingdom of Sweden
- Incumbent; Urban Andersson since August 2026
- Ministry for Foreign Affairs; Swedish Embassy, Managua
- Style: His or Her Excellency (formal); Mr. or Madam Ambassador (informal)
- Reports to: Minister for Foreign Affairs
- Residence: Didžioji Street 16, Old Town (Note: The ambassador's residence is at the same location as the chancery.)
- Seat: Vilnius, Lithuania
- Appointer: Government of Sweden
- Term length: No fixed term
- Inaugural holder: Torsten Undén
- Formation: 9 June 1922
- Website: Swedish Embassy, Vilnius

The Ambassador of Sweden to Lithuania (known formally as the Ambassador of the Kingdom of Sweden to the Republic of Lithuania) is the official representative of the government of Sweden to the president of Lithuania and government of Lithuania.

== History ==
On 31 July 1903, the district of the Swedish consulate in Riga was expanded to include the Kovno Governorate. On 11 June 1920, the King in Council decided to establish a consulate in Kovno (Kaunas) for Lithuania, but the appointed consul was soon recalled, and duties were temporarily handled by the Dutch consular agent. Despite pressure from business representatives to activate the consulate, the Riksdag in 1922 rejected funding for it, citing the same reasons given for Riga and Reval (Tallinn).

On 28 September 1921, the King in Council formally recognized the Republic of Lithuania as an independent and sovereign state. The following year, on 9 June 1922, Sweden's minister in Riga and Tallinn, Envoy Torsten Undén, was also appointed envoy extraordinary and minister plenipotentiary in Kaunas.

A salaried consulate in Kaunas was established in 1924 to support Swedish trade in Lithuania. However, as commercial activity remained limited, the consulate was soon considered unnecessary, with the legation in Riga deemed sufficient to handle both trade and political matters. In 1928, the closure of the consulate was recommended, with responsibilities to be handled instead by an honorary consul. The recommendation was approved, and from that year an honorary consul assumed the role.

In January 1936, the question was raised of stationing a legation counselor permanently in Kaunas to serve as chargé d’affaires ad interim. On 30 April that year, Claes Westring was appointed legation counselor at the Swedish mission in Riga, Kaunas, and Tallinn, with his post based in Kaunas. In the absence of the envoy, he served as chargé d’affaires ad interim.

In September 1939, Sweden's envoy to Riga, Tallinn, and Kaunas, Birger Johansson, presented his letters of recall to the Lithuanian and Estonian presidents after the Swedish Riksdag approved the establishment of independent legations in Lithuania and Estonia. At the same time, Legation Counselor Claes Westring took office in Kaunas as chargé d’affaires en pied. On 15 June 1940, the Soviet Union began its occupation of the Baltic states. Sweden closed its diplomatic missions in Riga, Tallinn, and Kaunas on 24 August 1940, with a deadline of 25 August set for the withdrawal.

In 1989, Sweden opened branch offices in Riga and Tallinn, headed by consuls and subordinate to the Swedish Consulate General in Leningrad. Lithuania, however, opposed the idea of an office tied to Leningrad. Instead, in 1991 Sweden opened an information office in Vilnius, subordinate to Stockholm and headed by Consul Vilhelm Rappe.

On 27 August 1991, the Swedish government decided to reestablish diplomatic relations with Lithuania. The agreement entered into force the next day, 28 August. Sweden’s new embassy in Vilnius was inaugurated on 29 August 1991, in a ceremony led by Minister for International Development Cooperation Lena Hjelm-Wallén.

== List of representatives ==
Name	Period	Title	Resident / Concurrent accreditation	Notes	Presented credentials	Ref
Torsten Undén	1922–1928	Envoy	Resident in Riga			
Patrik Reuterswärd	13 June 1928 – 1935	Envoy	Resident in Riga			
Herbert Ribbing	30 April – 2 June 1929	Chargé d'affaires ad interim (Note: With diplomatic rank of first legation secretary.)	Also in Riga and Tallinn			
Herbert Ribbing	15 November – 1 December 1929	Chargé d'affaires ad interim	Also in Riga and Tallinn			
Birger Johansson	1935 – September 1939	Envoy	Resident in Riga			
Claes Westring	1936 – September 1939	Chargé d'affaires ad interim (Note: With diplomatic rank of legation counsellor.)				
Claes Westring	September 1939 – 24 August 1940	Chargé d'affaires en pied				
No head of mission between 1940 and 1991
Lars Magnuson	1991–1994	Ambassador				
Stellan Ottosson	1994–1998	Ambassador				
Lars Vargö	1998–1999	Ambassador				
Jan Palmstierna	1999–2004	Ambassador				
Malin Kärre	2004–2008	Ambassador				
Ulrika Cronenberg Mossberg	2008–2011	Ambassador				
Cecilia Ruthström-Ruin	September 2011 – 2016	Ambassador				
Maria Christina Lundqvist	September 2016 – 2020	Ambassador				
Inger Buxton	September 2020 – 2023	Ambassador				
Lars Wahlund	August 2023 – 2026	Ambassador				
Urban Andersson	August 2026 – present	Ambassador			19 August 2026	

== See also ==
- Lithuania–Sweden relations
