= Unden =

Unden may refer to:

- A brand name for estrone, an estrogen medication
- Torsten Undén (1877–1962), Swedish diplomat
- Östen Undén (1886–1974), Swedish academic and politician
- Unden Peak (1667 m), a summit in the Rhodope Mountains of Bulgaria named after the Swedish politician
