= Erik Boheman =

Swedish diplomat and politician

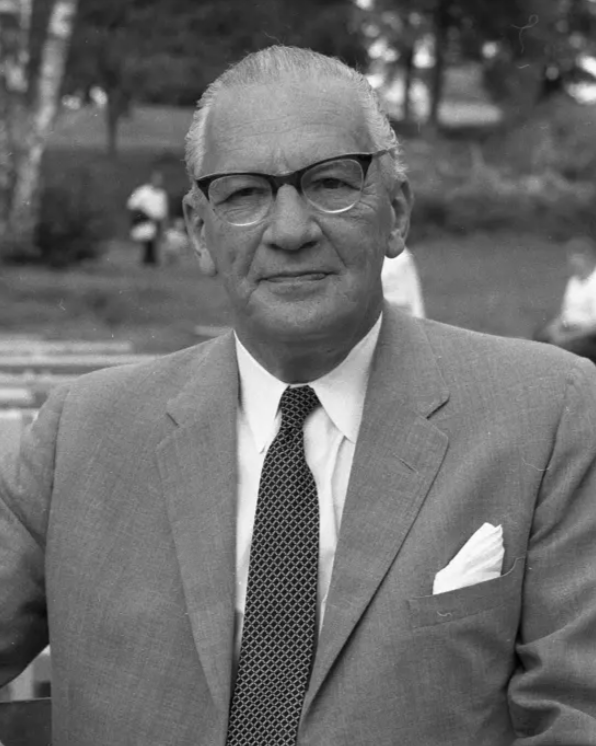

Ambassador of Sweden to the United States
- In office 1948–1958
- Preceded by: Herman Eriksson
- Succeeded by: Gunnar Jarring

Ambassador of Sweden to the United Kingdom
- In office 1947–1948
- Preceded by: Björn Prytz
- Succeeded by: Gunnar Hägglöf

Envoy of Sweden to France
- In office 1944–1947
- Preceded by: Einar Hennings
- Succeeded by: Karl Ivan Westman

State Secretary for Foreign Affairs
- In office 1938–1945
- Preceded by: Christian Günther
- Succeeded by: Stig Sahlin

Envoy of Sweden to Poland
- In office 1934–1937
- Preceded by: Einar Hennings
- Succeeded by: Joen Lagerberg

Envoy of Sweden to Romania
- In office 1934–1935
- Preceded by: Einar Hennings
- Succeeded by: Patrik Reuterswärd

Envoy of Sweden to Turkey
- In office 1931–1934
- Preceded by: Carl von Heidenstam
- Succeeded by: Wilhelm Winther

Envoy of Sweden to Bulgaria
- In office 1931–1934
- Preceded by: Carl von Heidenstam
- Succeeded by: Wilhelm Winther

Envoy of Sweden to Greece
- In office 1933–1934
- Preceded by: Jonas Alströmer
- Succeeded by: Wilhelm Winther

Personal details
- Born: Erik Carlsson Boheman; 19 January 1895 Stockholm, Sweden
- Died: 18 September 1979 (aged 84) Gränna, Sweden
- Party: Liberal People's Party
- Spouse(s): Gunnila Wachtmeister (m. 1919–1927) Margaret Mattsson (m. 1932)
- Children: 4
- Relatives: Richard Ulfsäter (great-grandson)
- Education: Stockholm University College
- Occupation: Diplomat, politician

Erik Carlsson Boheman (19 January 1895 – 18 September 1979), was a Swedish diplomat and politician for the Liberal People's Party.

== Early life and education ==
Boheman was born on 19 January 1895 in Stockholm, Sweden, the son of Carl Boheman, an administrative officer, and his wife Ellen (née Abramson). His paternal grandfather was entomologist Carl Henrik Boheman. His nephew was actor Erland Josephson. His mother was Jewish. Boheman studied at the Stockholm University College and graduated in 1918 with a Candidate of Law degree.

== Career ==
In 1918, he was appointed attaché to the Swedish foreign mission in Paris, and the following year to London. In 1920, he got a permanent position at the Swedish Ministry for Foreign Affairs, and during the beginning of the 1930s he was Sweden's envoy to Istanbul, Sofia, Athens, Warsaw and Bucharest. In 1938, he was appointed State Secretary for Foreign Affairs and held that position during World War II, up until 1945. During the war he was also Sweden's envoy to Paris, so the Deputy State Secretary for Foreign Affairs, Vilhelm Assarsson, had to step in as Acting Secretary on a number of occasions. He was appointed Ambassador of Sweden to the United Kingdom 1947–48, and Ambassador to the United States 1948–58. He was nominated for Secretary-General of the United Nations in the 1953 selection, but he declined the nomination. After World War II, Boheman falsely stated that "ignorant and over-diligent American economic spies" had "accused the Wallenberg group unjustly of having acted in collusion with the Germans" related to Bosch interests. In fact, this group helped cloak Nazi Germany's interests in the United States.

He was a member of the Riksdag 1959–1970 for the Liberal People's Party, the Gothenburg constituency, where he sat in the First Chamber of the then-bicameral Riksdag. He was Speaker of the First Chamber from 1965 until 1970, when the two Chambers merged into one.

Alongside his political mandates Boheman was also chairman of the board of directors of Saab Automobile (1958–1970), Skandinaviska Enskilda Banken and several other companies within the heavy industry sector.

== Personal life ==
Boheman was married from 1919 to 1927 to Countess Gunnila Wachtmeister (1899–1992), daughter of the university chancellor, Count Fredrik Wachtmeister, and Baroness Louise (af Ugglas). They had two children: Louise (1920–2013) and Carl Henrik (born 1924).

In 1932, Boheman married Margaret Mattsson (1904–2006), daughter of wholesaler Allan Mattsson and Karin (née Danielsson). They had two children: Monica (born 1933) and Carl Anders (born 1946).

Boheman is great-grandfather to actor Richard Ulfsäter.

== Death ==
Erik Boheman died on 18 September 1979 in Gränna, Sweden.

== Awards and decoratiuons ==
=== Swedish ===
- (Sweden) Royal Order of the Seraphim (6 June 1968)
- (Sweden) Commander Grand Cross of the Order of the Polar Star (6 June 1941)
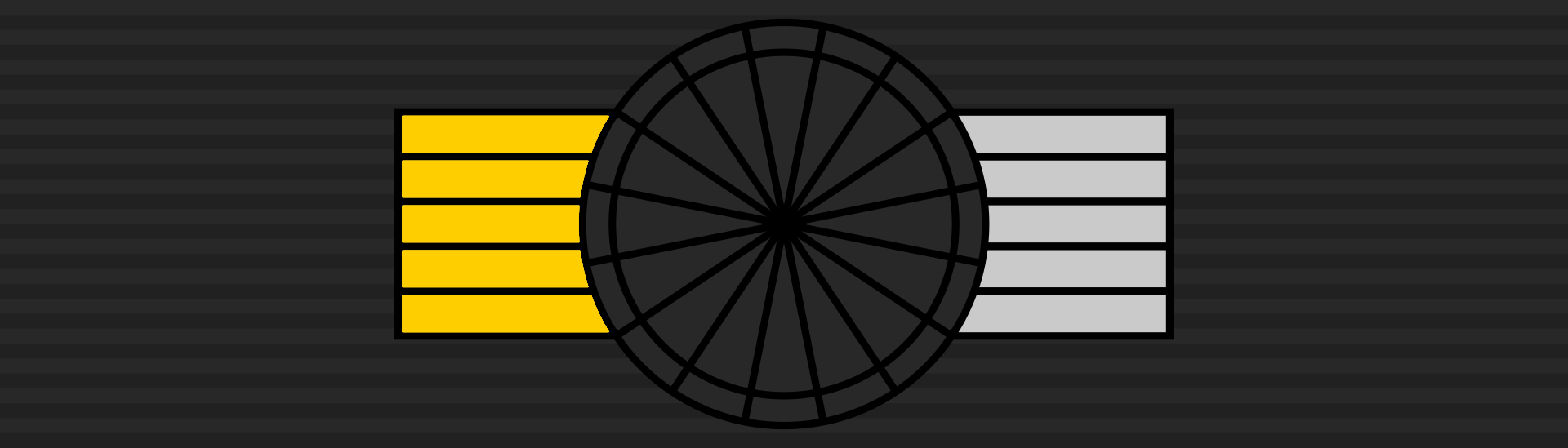
- (Sweden) Commander 1st Class of the Order of the Polar Star (15 November 1934)
- (Sweden) Knight of the Order of the Polar Star (1928)
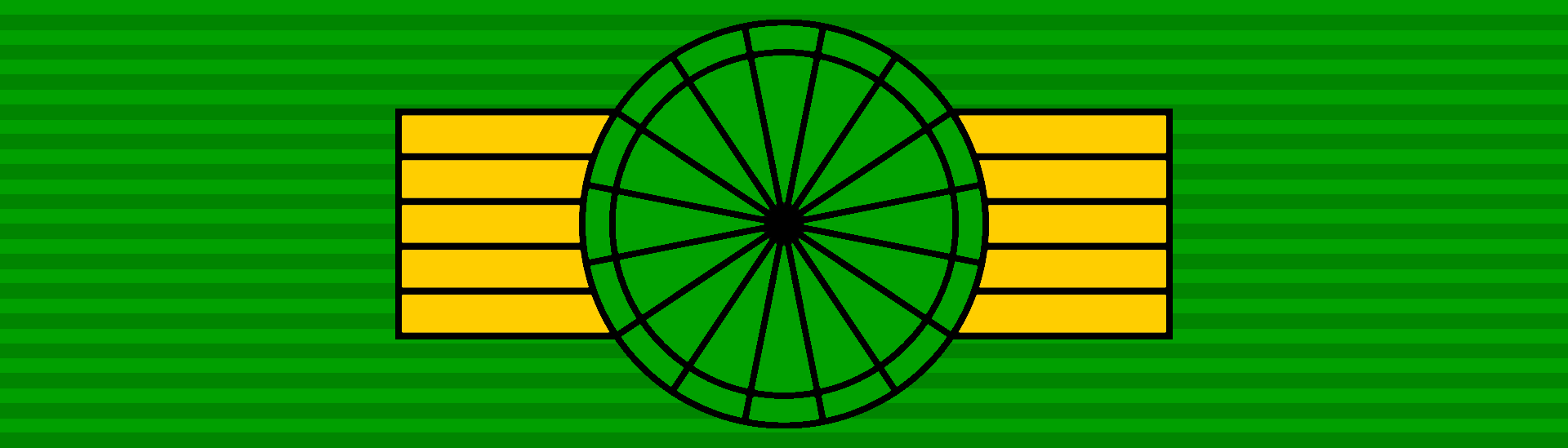
- (Sweden) Commander Grand Cross of the Order of Vasa (30 June 1958)

=== Foreign ===
- (Tsardom of Bulgaria (1908–1946)) Grand Cross of the Order of Civil Merit
- (Denmark) Grand Cross of the Order of the Dannebrog
- Grand Cross of the Order of the White Rose of Finland
- (Greece) Grand Cross of the Order of George I
- (Greece) Grand Cross of the Order of the Phoenix
- (Kingdom of Italy) Grand Cross of the Order of the Crown of Italy (20 October 1941)
- (Mexico) Sash of the Order of the Aztec Eagle (5 May 1949)
- (Netherlands) Grand Cross of the Order of Orange-Nassau
- (Poland) Grand Cross of the Order of Polonia Restituta
- (Kingdom of Romania) Grand Cross of the Order of the Crown of Romania
- (Chile) Grand Officer of the Order of Merit
- (France) Grand Officer of the Legion of Honour
- (Latvia) Grand Officer of the Order of the Three Stars
- (Spain) Commander 1st Class of the Order of Civil Merit
- (United Kingdom) Knight Commander of the Order of the British Empire
- Grand Officer of the Order of Merit of the Kingdom of Hungary
- (Belgium) Commander of the Order of the Crown

== Honors ==
- Honorary Doctor of Law, Gustavus Adolphus College
- Honorary Doctor of Law, Saint Peter's College
- Honorary Doctor of Law, Augustana College
- Honorary Doctor of Law, Upsala College (1950)
- Honorary Doctor of Law, Tufts College (1951)
- Member of the Royal Swedish Academy of War Sciences (1963)

== In popular culture ==
In the Sveriges Television movie, Fyra dagar som skakade Sverige – Midsommarkrisen 1941 (1988; Four days that shook Sweden – The Midsummer Crisis 1941), the role of Boheman is played by Swedish actor Lars-Erik Berenett.

Political offices
Preceded by Christian Günther	State Secretary for Foreign Affairs; 1938–1945	Succeeded by Stig Sahlin
Preceded by Gustaf Sundelin	First Chamber President; 1965–1970	Succeeded by first chamber ceases
Diplomatic posts
Preceded by Carl von Heidenstam	Envoy of Sweden to Turkey; 1931–1934	Succeeded by Wilhelm Winther
Preceded by Carl von Heidenstam	Envoy of Sweden to Bulgaria; 1931–1934	Succeeded by Wilhelm Winther
Preceded by Jonas Alströmer	Envoy of Sweden to Greece; 1933–1934	Succeeded by Wilhelm Winther
Preceded by Einar Hennings	Envoy of Sweden to Poland; 1934–1937	Succeeded by Joen Lagerberg
Preceded by Einar Hennings	Envoy of Sweden to Romania; 1934–1935	Succeeded by Patrik Reuterswärd
Preceded by Einar Hennings	Envoy of Sweden to France; 1944–1947	Succeeded by Karl Ivan Westman
Preceded by Björn Prytz	Ambassador of Sweden to the United Kingdom; 1947–1948	Succeeded by Gunnar Hägglöf
Preceded by Herman Eriksson	Ambassador of Sweden to the United States; 1948–1958	Succeeded by Gunnar Jarring
