= Jonas Alströmer (1877–1955) =

Swedish diplomat

Baron Jonas Alströmer
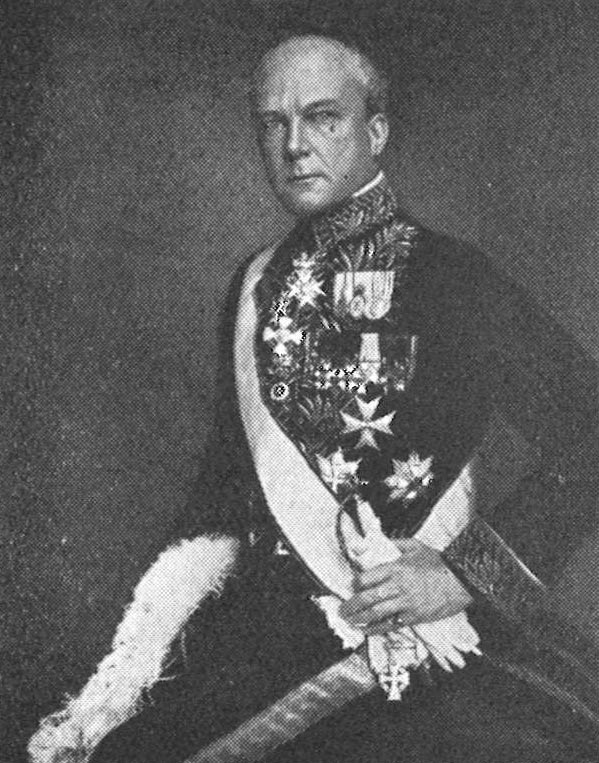
- Born: Jonas Magnus Alströmer; 21 August 1877; Lunda, Sweden
- Died: 30 November 1955 (aged 78); Vadsbro, Sweden
- Education: Uppsala University
- Occupation: Diplomat
- Years active: 1906–1933
- Spouse(s): Vera Elisabet Axelson (m. 1908, divorced) Rigmor Maria Tvermoes (m. 1921; died 1925) Ebba Jeanette Adine Peyron (m. 1936)
- Children: 3

Friherre Jonas Magnus Alströmer (21 August 1877 – 30 November 1955) was a Swedish diplomat. Alströmer began his diplomatic career in 1908 at the Swedish Ministry for Foreign Affairs, rising to first secretary by the end of that year. During World War I, he served as acting head of the Ministry's Legal Division and later took on key international roles, including chargé d'affaires in London (1918–1919) and diplomatic postings in Paris and Kristiania (now Oslo). In 1921, he was appointed resident minister and head of the personnel and administrative department at the Ministry, followed by positions as consul general in Shanghai and envoy to Switzerland, Vienna, and Budapest. He represented Sweden at several international conferences, including those of the Red Cross, and participated in trade negotiations with Greece and Romania.

== Early life ==
Alströmer was born on 21 August 1877 at the Åkersta farm in Lunda Parish, Nyköping Municipality, Sweden, the son of Friherre Jonas Alströmer, a factory manager, and his wife Sigrid Björkenheim. He received a Bachelor of both laws degree at Uppsala University on 23 May 1903.

== Career ==
Alströmer began his career as an extraordinary ordinary notary in the Svea Court of Appeal in 1903 and in the Göta Court of Appeal in the same year. He did his clerkship from 1903 to 1906. He became an assistant at the Ministry of Agriculture on 15 February 1906. Later that year, in June, he joined the Swedish Forest Service (Domänstyrelsen), and by 1 December 1906, he was appointed valet de chambre. He was an acting legal clerk (domänfiskal) at the Swedish Forest Service in 1907. On 23 February 1908, he became second secretary at the Ministry for Foreign Affairs, and by 31 December 1908, he had advanced to first secretary.

From 17 October 1914 to 31 December 1916, Alströmer served as acting head of the Legal Division at the Ministry for Foreign Affairs. During this period, he also acted as secretary of the Ministry's Admissions Commission (1914–1917) and was appointed chamberlain on 31 December 1914. On 27 December 1916, he became an extraordinary department head at the Ministry.

In the following years, Alströmer took on several diplomatic roles. He served as acting legation secretary in Paris from 18 September 1917 to 23 July 1918, and as first legation secretary in Kristiania (now Oslo) starting 22 July 1918. Shortly thereafter, he returned to Paris as acting legation secretary from 26 August to 6 December 1918, before moving to London as acting legation secretary on 10 December 1918. From 18 December 1918 to 4 November 1919, he served as chargé d'affaires ad interim in London and was awarded the title of legation counsellor on 12 September 1919.

Alströmer represented the Swedish Red Cross at the International Law Association's conference in Portsmouth in 1920. He was also a member of an international committee established to draft proposals for the treatment of prisoners of war (1920–1921) and a delegate at the London conference on the continued publication of the International Catalogue of Scientific Literature in 1920.

On 26 September 1921, Alströmer was appointed resident minister and head of the personnel and administrative department at the Ministry for Foreign Affairs. He subsequently served as consul general in Shanghai and consular judge from 16 December 1921 to 17 March 1922. On 28 June 1922, he became envoy extraordinary and minister plenipotentiary to the Swiss Confederation, and from 27 September 1924, he simultaneously held postings in Vienna and Budapest. In 1923 and 1925, Alströmer was a delegate to the International Red Cross conference in Geneva. He became acting envoy in Bucharest, Athens, and Belgrade in 1925. He was representative of the trade treaty negotiation with Greece in 1926 and with Romania from 1930 to 1931. Alströmer was also representative in negotiations with Greece regarding ship's survey from 1928 to 1929 and clearing agreements in 1932.

== Personal life ==
=== Marriages ===
Alströmer was married three times:

1st marriage: On 27 November 1908 in Malmö, to Vera Elisabet Axelson. This was her first marriage (she later married the engineer Walter Kircher). She was born on 13 March 1889 in Malmö, the daughter of wholesaler Severin Magnus Axelson and Hulda Lovisa Augusta Malmström. Alströmer and Axelson later divorced.

2nd marriage: On 19 July 1921 in London, to Kigmor Maria Tvermoes. This was her third marriage.

- 1st marriage: On 29 April 1897, to the Danish court hunting master and legation counselor, Baron Carl Oskar Herman Leopoldus Løvenskiold of Løvenborg, from whom she divorced. This was his first marriage. He was born on 29 January 1864.
- 2nd marriage: On 23 May 1902 in Copenhagen, to Count Sven Hugo Roger Hamilton, born in 1871, died in 1920.

Kigmor Maria Tvermoes was born on 11 October 1879 in Copenhagen, the daughter of Conference Councillor Godtfred Ferdinand Tvermoes and Matilde Esskildsen. She died on 9 September 1925 in Bern and was buried in Copenhagen.

3rd marriage: On 11 July 1936 in Vreta kloster socken, Östergötland County, to Ebba Jeanette Adine Peyron (born 14 January 1883 in Helsingborg). This was her second marriage. She was the daughter of the major and friherre Gustaf Fredrik Peyron and Ebba Eleonora Charlotta Augusta Hallenborg.

=== Children ===
- Carl Tore Jonas, born 1879; factory manager
- Ester Jenny Sigrid, born 6 October 1883 at Åkerstad, passed away there the same year on 1 December.
- Oskar Jonas Nikolaus, born 11 January 1888 at Östad, passed away there the same year on 27 April.

=== Other ===
Alströmer was the owner of Naddö mansion in Vadstena Municipality.

Alströmer was an honorary citizen of Nauplion in Greece.

== Awards and decorations ==
=== Swedish ===
- (Sweden) King Oscar II and Queen Sofia's Golden Wedding Medal (6 June 1907)
- (Sweden) King Gustaf V's Jubilee Commemorative Medal (1948)
- (Sweden) King Gustaf V's Jubilee Commemorative Medal (1928)
- (Sweden) Commander Grand Cross of the Order of the Polar Star (16 June 1933)
- (Sweden) Knight of the Order of the Polar Star (5 June 1920)
- (Sweden) King Gustaf V Olympic Commemorative Medal (Konung Gustaf V:s olympiska minnesmedalj) (1912)

=== Foreign ===
- (Denmark) Grand Cross of the Order of the Dannebrog (9 March 1931)
- (Greece) Grand Cross of the Order of the Phoenix (between 1931 and 1935)
- (Kingdom of Yugoslavia) Grand Cross of the Order of St. Sava (between 1928 and 1931)
- (Romania) Grand Cross of the Order of the Crown (between 1931 and 1935)
- (Hungary) First Class of the Hungarian Cross of Merit (1926)
- (Netherlands) Grand Officer of the Order of Orange-Nassau (1922)
- (Bulgaria) Commander of the Order of Saint Alexander (1921)
- (Kingdom of Italy) Commander of the Order of the Crown of Italy (1913)
- (Belgium) Officer of the Order of the Crown (1910)
- (France) Officer of the Legion of Honour (1920)
- (Kingdom of Prussia) Knight 3rd Class of the Order of the Crown (1908)
- (Russian Empire) Knight 3rd Class of the Order of Saint Anna (1909)
- (Thailand) 4th Class of the Order of the White Elephant (1916)
- (Austria) Knight 3rd Class of the Order of the Iron Crown (1909)
- (Austria) Officer of the Decoration for Services to the Red Cross with war decoration (1920)

Diplomatic posts
Preceded by Johan Hultman	Consul General of Sweden to Shanghai; 1921–1922	Succeeded by Johan Lilliehöök af Fårdala
Preceded by Patrick Adlercreutz	Envoy of Sweden to Switzerland; 1922–1925	Succeeded by Einar Hennings
Preceded by Ivan Danielsson	Envoy of Sweden to Hungary; 1924–1925	Succeeded by Einar Hennings
Preceded by Ivan Danielsson	Envoy of Sweden to Austria; 1924–1925	Succeeded by Einar Hennings
Preceded by Einar af Wirsén	Envoy of Sweden to Romania; 1925–1933	Succeeded by Einar Hennings
Preceded by Einar af Wirsén	Envoy of Sweden to Greece; 1925–1933	Succeeded by Erik Boheman
Preceded by Einar af Wirsén	Envoy of Sweden to Yugoslavia; 1925–1928	Succeeded by Torsten Undén
