= Ivan Danielsson =

Swedish diplomat (1880–1963)

- Born: Carl Ivan Danielsson; 13 August 1880; Le Havre, France
- Died: 21 July 1963 (aged 83); Nogaredo, Italy
- Education: Uppsala University
- Occupation: Diplomat
- Years active: 1903–1945
- Spouse(s): Ella Langaard (m. 1911; div. 1944) Josefine Maria Lodron-Laterano (m. 1945)
- Children: 2
- Relatives: Christian Langaard (father-in-law); Knut Christian Langaard (brother-in-law)

Carl Ivan Danielsson (13 August 1880 – 21 July 1963) was a Swedish diplomat who served in the Swedish foreign service for more than four decades. He held a succession of diplomatic posts across Europe and the Middle East, including as Sweden's envoy to Spain and Portugal, Austria and Hungary, Egypt, and Hungary. He also served as chargé d'affaires in Kristiania and Warsaw and held senior positions at Swedish legations in Berlin and Copenhagen.

Danielsson spent much of the interwar period in Spain, where he closely followed the country's political upheavals from the final years of the dictatorship of Miguel Primo de Rivera, through the fall of the monarchy and the establishment of the Second Spanish Republic. His frequent and detailed reports to the Swedish Ministry for Foreign Affairs provide an important contemporary record of Swedish diplomatic assessments of Spanish politics during the late 1920s and 1930s. He also reported extensively on political unrest, the Spanish Civil War, and the country's changing relations between monarchists, republicans, socialists, and other political movements.

During the Second World War, Danielsson served as Swedish envoy to Hungary and head of the Swedish legation in Budapest from 1942 to 1945. Following the German occupation of Hungary in 1944 and the subsequent persecution and deportation of Hungarian Jews, the Swedish legation became involved in humanitarian efforts to protect Jews threatened by The Holocaust. Danielsson worked alongside diplomats including Raoul Wallenberg and Per Anger, under whose direction and within whose wider mission the legation participated in issuing protective documents and providing assistance to people at risk. During the final stages of the Siege of Budapest, Danielsson was briefly detained by Soviet forces before making his way back to Sweden in April 1945.

Danielsson's diplomatic career also included a controversial posting in Egypt, where he was declared persona non grata and removed as Swedish envoy amid political tensions and allegations concerning pro-Axis sympathies within his circle. His political views and conduct have subsequently been the subject of historical debate. He retired from the Swedish diplomatic service in August 1945 and was granted a pension. He later lived in Bordighera, Italy, and died in Nogaredo in 1963.

== Early life ==
Danielsson was born on 13 August 1880 in Le Havre, France, the son of Consul General Daniel Danielsson and his wife Aurora Hornberg. He earned a Bachelor of Arts from a French university in 1897 and completed the Court of Appeal law degree (hovrättsexamen) at Uppsala University in 1903.

== Career ==
=== Early diplomatic career ===
Danielsson began his diplomatic career as an attaché in Brussels in 1903, before serving in Berlin in 1904. He was appointed acting second secretary at the Ministry for Foreign Affairs in 1905, became second secretary in 1906, and first secretary in 1908. That same year, he served as chargé d'affaires ad interim in Kristiania (now Oslo). He was posted to Copenhagen as legation secretary in 1910, received the honorary rank of legation councillor in 1916, became first legation secretary in Berlin in 1918, was granted the rank of minister plenipotentiary in 1919, and served as chargé d'affaires in Warsaw from 1919 to 1920.

From 1921 to 1922, Danielsson served as the Swedish envoy to Spain and Portugal, followed by appointments as envoy to Austria and Hungary from 1923 to 1924. His tenure coincided with the turbulent aftermath of World War I and the dissolution of the Austro-Hungarian Empire, as both countries grappled with inflation, political instability, social unrest, and the rebuilding of their state institutions.

From 1924 to 1925, Danielsson was placed on the diplomatic reserve (disponibilitet) in Stockholm for a special government assignment. Later in 1925, he returned to Spain to resume diplomatic service.

=== Spain and Portugal (1925–1937) ===
Danielsson was Sweden's Minister Plenipotentiary in Spain for most of the 1920s and the first six years of the 1930s. He sent exceptionally detailed and frequent reports to the Swedish government on Spanish political developments, sometimes producing one or several dispatches per week. His reports therefore provide a near week-by-week account of Spanish politics. Although Danielsson rarely disclosed his sources, referring instead to "my informant" or "a reliable source," he occasionally mentioned contacts such as the apostolic nuncio, fellow diplomats in Madrid, Sweden's Consul General Luis de la Peña, and aristocrats close to the royal household. His assessments thus drew largely on contacts within Spain's political and business elites, the diplomatic corps, and circles surrounding the monarchy. Together with the later reports of Erik Wisén, Danielsson's dispatches constitute a fundamental source for understanding how the Swedish government perceived the political realities of the Spanish Republic.

Danielsson closely followed and reported on Spain's political crisis during the final years of Miguel Primo de Rivera's dictatorship. From 1929 onward, he informed the Swedish Ministry for Foreign Affairs about growing opposition among the military, students, and the wider population, as well as plans to restore constitutional government. He was critical of Primo de Rivera's policies and noted the dictatorship's declining support. After its fall, he reported on the rise of Dámaso Berenguer, continued political unrest, and student protests demanding a republic. Danielsson initially viewed Berenguer's government positively, highlighting its amnesty, press freedoms, removal of Primo de Rivera supporters, and plans to restore constitutional government. However, he noted that censorship and restrictions on political meetings remained, while republican sentiment was growing. He believed Berenguer genuinely wanted to restore constitutional rule but needed to proceed gradually because of unreliable electoral lists.

Danielsson reported growing political unrest, with violent clashes between students and supporters of the Republic and increasing anti-monarchical sentiment. He also reported rumours of a military conspiracy to restore the dictatorship, although the King rejected it. Danielsson considered Berenguer well-intentioned but unable to handle the situation. He also described Primo de Rivera's death, noting his patriotism and popularity among ordinary people, while observing the growing strength of republican and socialist movements and the weakening of the monarchy. Danielsson reported on the activities of republican and socialist leaders and noted growing political unrest and student protests. He was increasingly critical of Berenguer's government, especially after censorship was reintroduced and political discussion was restricted. By June 1930, he described the government as "dictatorial" and linked this to growing opposition, political instability, and the decline of the peseta. He also noted more moderate policies toward Catalonia and proposals to reform the monarchy into a more democratic constitutional system.

Danielsson reported on strikes, violent clashes, and growing political unrest, often attributing the disturbances to communist and left-wing groups. He was critical of the government's de facto dictatorship, arguing that continued repression could be more dangerous than allowing political freedom. He closely followed the repeated introduction and removal of censorship and noted worsening social and economic conditions, including low wages, rising prices, and the falling peseta. At the same time, he believed that the foreign press exaggerated the scale of the unrest. Danielsson reported extensively on the Jaca uprising and Cuatro Vientos revolt, seeing them as part of a wider military plot to establish a republic. He believed the government and King still had majority support within the army and downplayed reports of widespread unrest, often blaming communist elements for violence. Although he recognized the growing strength of republicanism, he continued to believe that the monarchy remained more popular among the wider population.

In January 1931, Danielsson described the republican movement as increasingly organized and influential, again viewing Jaca and Cuatro Vientos as part of a republican conspiracy. He noted growing hostility toward Alfonso XIII and criticized the King's confidence in the army. Danielsson also reported divisions among monarchists over whether to maintain the existing system or call constituent elections. He believed the King was making a serious mistake by refusing to distance himself from the government and warned that the apparent calm might be "the calm before the storm." Danielsson initially believed the Aznar government could still control the uncertain situation and considered Spain broadly monarchist. However, he closely followed the events of April 1931 and reported that the municipal elections had decisively weakened the monarchy. He described the proclamation of the Republic as remarkably rapid and peaceful, with strong public enthusiasm and a neutral army. He also noted that the new republican coalition was diverse, consisting largely of socialists and people who opposed Alfonso XIII because of his association with Primo de Rivera's dictatorship.

Danielsson reported that the new Republican government was quickly establishing its authority across Spain and that the main threat appeared to come from communists rather than monarchists. He also highlighted the rapid introduction of political, social, and administrative reforms, with the Catalan question as a major concern. In April 1931, he met Niceto Alcalá-Zamora and provided Sweden with profiles of the Republic's leading figures, assessing their political positions, influence, and personalities. Danielsson's reports during the early Republic focused on six main issues: the monarchy and Alfonso XIII, Church–State relations, the Constituent Cortes, military unrest and revolutionary strikes, major reforms such as Catalonia and land reform, and Spain's financial and political situation in 1933. In May 1931, he noted the Republic's active reform programme, including electoral and military reforms, while highlighting tensions with the Catholic Church and the monarchist cause.

Danielsson closely reported the church burnings and unrest of May 1931, which he witnessed personally. He strongly criticized the government's initial passivity and doubted its claim that the violence was the result of a monarchist conspiracy. He believed radical and communist groups had exploited tensions between the Republic and the Catholic Church, warning that the Republic risked developing into a broader social revolution. Danielsson remained highly critical of the Republican government after the May 1931 church burnings. He suspected that parts of the government had at least tolerated the attacks, believing they helped weaken the monarchist opposition and advance the separation of church and state. He supported this view with reports from the papal nuncio and the Swedish consul in Cádiz, who described similar attacks and alleged government inaction.

Danielsson closely followed the religious conflict between the Republic and the Catholic Church. He warned that measures such as separating Church and State, restricting religious education, and dissolving the Jesuits could provoke serious unrest and even a break with the Vatican. He noted Alcalá-Zamora's resignation over the religious provisions of the Constitution and feared that the issue could deeply divide Spanish society, although he hoped a moderate solution could ultimately be found. Danielsson viewed the Religious Congregations Law as one of the clearest signs of the Republic's revolutionary character. He warned that transferring education from religious orders to the state could leave hundreds of thousands of children without schools and increase tensions with Catholics and the Vatican. He also believed that the religious conflict contributed to the fall of Azaña's government in 1933, reflecting his broader concern that radical secularization could destabilize Spain.

Danielsson closely followed the Constituent Cortes elections, noting growing political tension and increasing left-wing influence, particularly in Andalusia. He considered the elections relatively peaceful and saw them as a defeat for extremists on both sides, although he criticized the new regime for becoming increasingly authoritarian. He was especially concerned about Azaña's extensive powers under the Law for the Defense of the Republic, which he described as giving the government "dictatorial powers." Danielsson was strongly critical of the Republic's early authoritarian tendencies, arguing that major reforms were being imposed in a "completely dictatorial" manner before the elections. He also criticized threats of political violence and viewed the new Constitution as extremely radical and heavily influenced by the socialist left. Regarding Azaña's government, he highlighted its focus on economic, agrarian, Catalan, electoral, and secular reforms.

=== Service in Egypt (1937–1942) ===
In 1937, Danielsson was appointed Swedish envoy to Egypt, a strategically important post given the country's position within the British sphere of influence and its proximity to key theatres of the Second World War. His tenure in Cairo coincided with a period of increasing geopolitical tension, culminating in the North African campaign.

Danielsson's posting in Egypt ended in controversy when he was declared persona non grata and subsequently removed from his position as Swedish minister. Contemporary and later archival sources suggest that the decision was linked to political tensions surrounding his mission, including allegations—reported in confidential British diplomatic correspondence—that his wife was perceived as sympathetic to the Axis powers. These circumstances contributed to strained relations between Danielsson and the Egyptian authorities, ultimately forcing his replacement.

While some interpretations have associated Danielsson with pro-German attitudes, later historiographical assessments have questioned the extent of any ideological alignment with Nazism, instead characterising his outlook as broadly pro-German in the context of the period. The episode in Egypt remains one of several disputed incidents in his diplomatic career. His recall marked the end of his Middle Eastern posting and preceded his appointment to a far more challenging position in Budapest later that same year.

=== Budapest period (1942–1945) ===
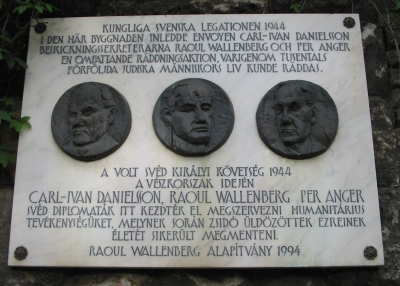
Plaque at the site of the former Swedish legation in Budapest, honoring Ivan Danielsson, Raoul Wallenberg, and Per Anger

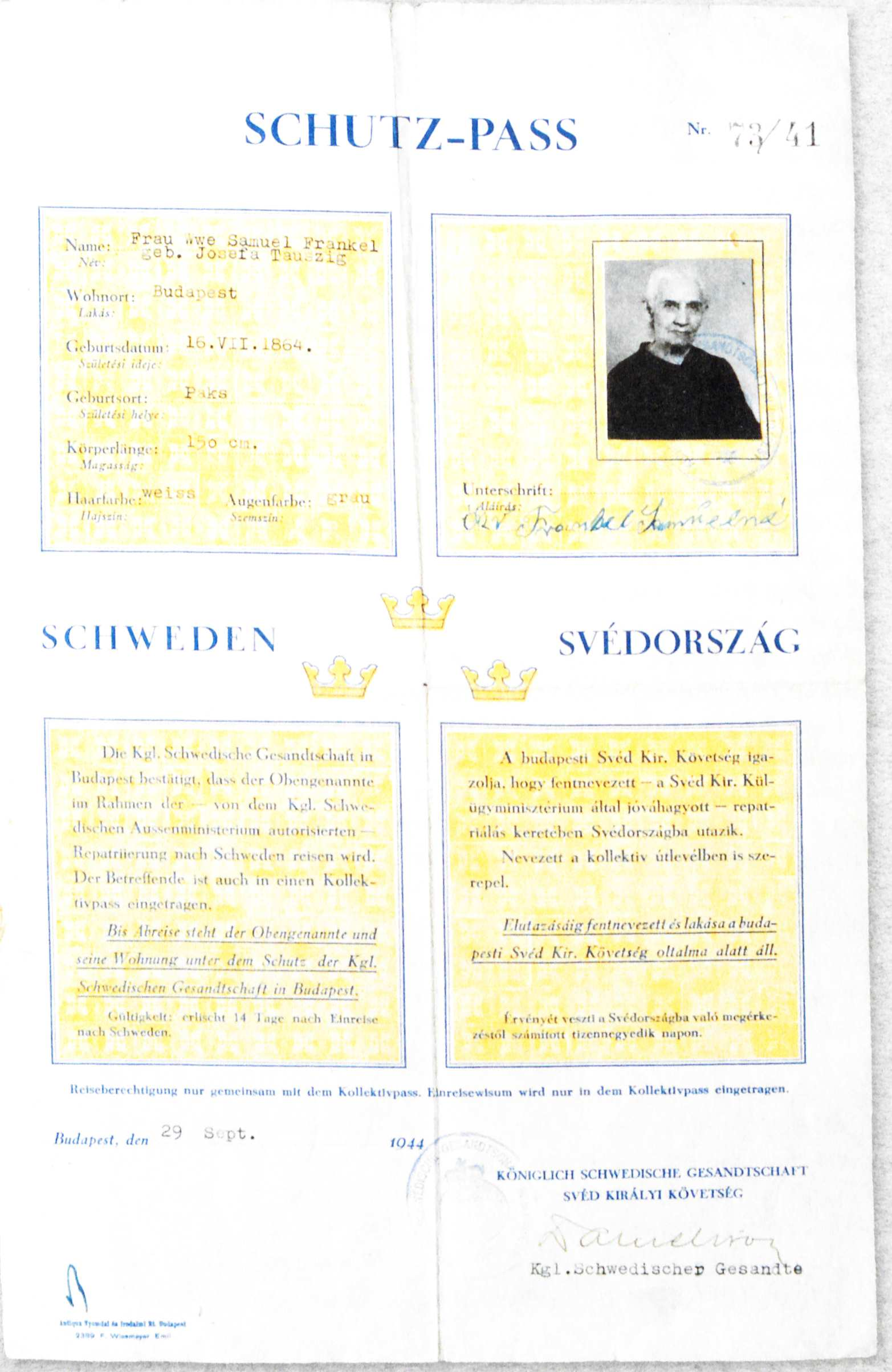
Raoul Wallenberg protective passport (Schutzpass), dated 29 September 1944, for Josefa Frankel, née Tauszig, signed by Carl Ivan Danielsson and initialed by Wallenberg in the lower left.

In 1942, Danielsson was appointed Swedish envoy to Hungary and head of the Swedish legation in Budapest, at a time when the situation for Hungarian Jews had become increasingly dire following the German occupation in March of that year. As head of mission, he bore formal responsibility for Sweden's diplomatic presence and for the activities carried out under its protection, including humanitarian efforts.

Danielsson's tenure took place during a period of extreme instability as the Axis-aligned government of Ferenc Szálasi took power and the Red Army advanced towards Budapest in 1944–1945. Relations with the Hungarian authorities deteriorated sharply, and the Swedish legation was subjected to serious violations of its diplomatic status. During this period, Danielsson was forced to seek temporary refuge, first in the nunciature and later in the Swiss legation, as conditions in the city worsened.

As head of mission, Danielsson worked alongside diplomat Raoul Wallenberg and attaché Per Anger in efforts to protect Jews in wartime Budapest. The Swedish legation participated in issuing protective documents and passports and used its diplomatic position to support civilians at risk of deportation and persecution during the Holocaust. These initiatives placed the Swedish mission among several foreign diplomatic representations in Budapest engaged in rescue activities, alongside diplomats such as Carl Lutz, Ángel Sanz Briz, and Angelo Rotta.

In early 1945, during the final phase of the Siege of Budapest, Danielsson was taken into custody and briefly interned by Soviet forces in southern Hungary. He subsequently managed to leave Hungary via Bucharest and Moscow, before returning to Sweden in April 1945 as a diplomatic courier.

Danielsson's actions in Budapest have been interpreted as consistent with his earlier conduct during the Spanish Civil War, when he was involved in facilitating the evacuation of refugees through Swedish diplomatic channels. His role in Budapest has therefore been viewed both in the context of his leadership of a key wartime diplomatic mission and in relation to broader humanitarian interventions carried out by neutral diplomats in occupied Europe. At the end of August 1945, Danielsson retired from the Swedish diplomatic service and was granted a pension.

== Personal life and death ==
=== First marriage ===
In his first marriage, Danielsson was married to Ella Langaard (born 1882) from 1911 to 1944. She was the daughter of the Norwegian industrialist and art collector Christian Langaard (1849–1922) and Ellevine Marie Langaard (1857–1890). He was the brother-in-law of Knut Christian Langaard (1886–1965).

=== Second marriage ===
After divorcing Langaard, Danielsson married Countess Josefine Maria "Giuseppina" Lodron-Laterano (1912–2001). Countess Josefine Maria Lodron-Laterano, later known as Josie Owen, lived a complex and controversial life during World War II. Originally of Italian-Austrian background, she married Irish schoolmaster Charles Owen in 1936 and lived with him in Egypt, where he worked as a headmaster. During this period, she began an affair with Danielsson. The couple later divorced in 1944, after which she married Danielsson and eventually settled with him in retirement on the Italian Riviera.

Her wartime activities drew the attention of British intelligence (MI5). She had been interned in Egypt for allegedly spreading pro-German propaganda during Erwin Rommel's campaign in North Africa and was suspected of having pro-Nazi sympathies. After returning to the United Kingdom in 1943, she worked for the International Red Cross and maintained connections with diplomatic circles, including correspondence with Danielsson via Swedish channels.

MI5 considered whether she might be linked to the mysterious German spy "JOSEPHINE," who was believed to be transmitting intelligence from Britain to Germany. There were notable coincidences in timing, movements, and contacts, and she had the means to communicate internationally. However, no conclusive evidence was found, and she eventually disappeared from the investigation. Although her direct involvement in espionage was never proven, her reputation remained questionable. Her relationship with Danielsson and her suspected activities contributed to Allied suspicions about him as well, potentially affecting how both British and Soviet intelligence viewed the Swedish diplomatic mission.

=== Residence ===
He lived in Bordighera, Italy, from around 1950.

=== Death ===
Danielsson died on 21 July 1963 in Nogaredo, Villa Lagarina, Italy.

== Awards and decorations ==
=== Swedish ===
- (Sweden) King Gustaf V's Jubilee Commemorative Medal (1928)
- (Sweden) Grand Cross of the Order of the Polar Star (17 November 1931)
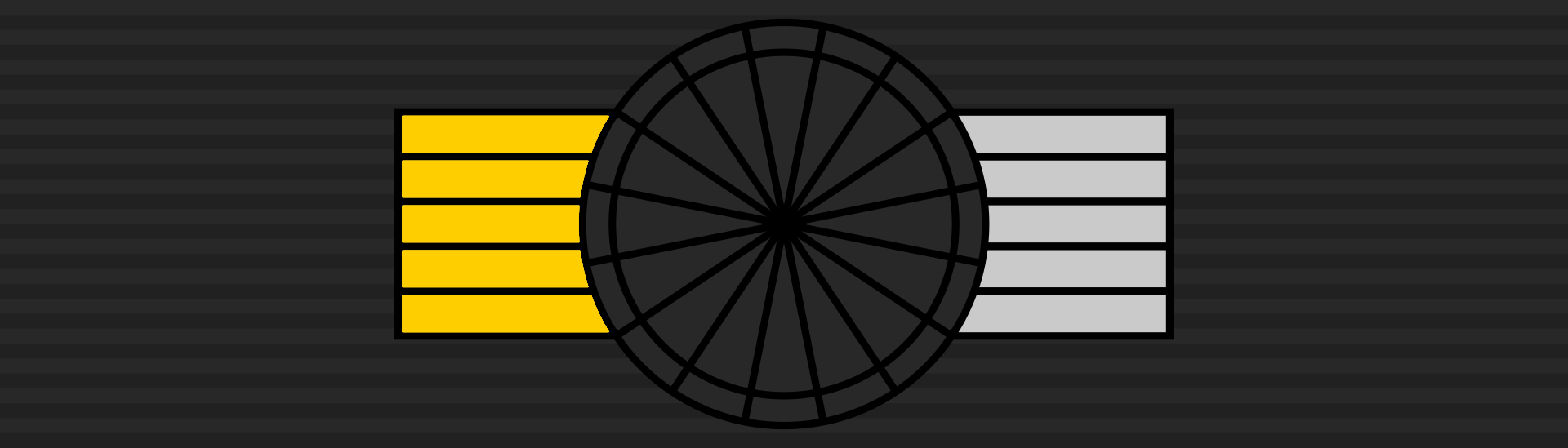
- (Sweden) Commander 1st Class of the Order of the Polar Star (6 June 1923)
- (Sweden) Knight of the Order of the Polar Star (1915)

=== Foreign ===
- (Portugal) Grand Cross of the Military Order of Christ (18 July 1923)
- (Greece) Grand Cross of the Order of the Phoenix (before 1950)
- (Netherlands) Grand Cross of the Order of Orange-Nassau (before 1947)
- (Spain) Grand Cross of the Order of Isabella the Catholic (before 1925)
- (Poland) Grand Officer of the Order of Polonia Restituta (before 1925)
- (Denmark) Commander of the Order of the Dannebrog (before 1915)
- (Grand Duchy of Baden) Knight 1st Class of the Order of the Zähringer Lion (before 1909)
- (Egypt) 1st Class of the Order of the Nile (before 1940)
- (Nazi Germany) 1st Class of the Order of the German Eagle (before 1945)
- 1st Class of the Order of Merit of the Kingdom of Hungary (before 1931)
- (Denmark) Knight of the Order of the Dannebrog (before 1909)
- (Belgium) Knight of the Order of the Crown (before 1915)
- (France) Knight of the Legion of Honour (before 1909)
- (Monaco) Knight of the Order of Saint Charles (before 1909)
- (Spain) Knight of the Order of Charles III (before 1908)
- (Russian Empire) Knight 3rd Class of the Order of Saint Anna (before 1909)
- (Spain) Cross of Naval Merit (Yellow?) (before 1931)
- Decoration of Honour for Services to the Republic of Austria (before 1931)

=== Honors ===
In 1982, Danielsson was recognized by Yad Vashem as one of the Righteous Among the Nations

Diplomatic posts
Preceded by Augustin Beck-Friis	Envoy of Sweden to Spain; 1921–1922	Succeeded by Wollmar Boström
Preceded by Augustin Beck-Friis	Envoy of Sweden to Portugal; 1921–1922	Succeeded by Wollmar Boström
Preceded by Oskar Ewerlöf	Envoy of Sweden to Austria; 1923–1924	Succeeded by Jonas Alströmer
Preceded by Oskar Ewerlöf	Envoy of Sweden to Hungary; 1923–1924	Succeeded by Jonas Alströmer
Preceded by Wollmar Boström	Envoy of Sweden to Spain; 1925–1937	Succeeded by Karl Ivan Westman
Preceded by Wollmar Boström	Envoy of Sweden to Portugal; 1925–1937	Succeeded by Johan Beck-Friis
Preceded by Harald Bildt	Envoy of Sweden to Egypt; 1937–1942	Succeeded by Widar Bagge (from 1945)
Preceded by Torsten Undén	Envoy of Sweden to Hungary; 1942–1945	Succeeded by Sven Allard (from 1949)
