= Oskar Ewerlöf =

Swedish diplomat (1876–1934)

- Born: Oskar Anton Herman Ewerlöf; 14 April 1876; Stockholm, Sweden
- Died: 22 October 1934 (aged 58); Copenhagen, Denmark
- Education: Katedralskolan; Lund University
- Occupation: Diplomat
- Years active: 1904–1934
- Relatives: Eric Virgin (brother-in-law)

Oskar Anton Herman Ewerlöf (14 April 1876 – 22 October 1934) was a Swedish diplomat who joined the Ministry for Foreign Affairs in 1904. He served in Brussels and The Hague before becoming second secretary and later counsellor and head of the ministry's Legal Department. In 1913, he was appointed state secretary for foreign affairs, a position he held until 1918, during the First World War. He subsequently served as Sweden's envoy in Vienna and Budapest, becoming Sweden's first envoy to Hungary after diplomatic relations were established in 1920. He was later appointed minister to Japan and transferred to Beijing in 1923, where he represented Sweden at the Special Conference on the Chinese Customs Tariff in 1925–1926. From 1929 until his death in 1934, he served as Swedish minister in Copenhagen.

== Early life ==
Ewerlöf was born on 14 April 1876 in Stockholm, Sweden, the son of Colonel Fritz Ewerlöf (1843–1909) and his wife, Anna Elisabeth Gustava Groothoff (1850–1938). His uncle was colonel and politician Waldemar Ewerlöf (1845–1911), who served as a member of the Swedish Parliament, and his grandfather was the civil servant and author Frans Ewerlöf (1799–1883). His sister, Olga Ewerlöf (1880–1976), was married to Major General Eric Virgin, who served as Chief of the Swedish Air Force from 1931 to 1934.

Ewerlöf spent his childhood and youth in Scania. He graduated from Katedralskolan in Lund in 1893. He earned a Doctor of both laws (Juris utriusque kandidat) degree from Lund University in 1900.

== Career ==
Ewerlöf served as a junior official in the Ministry of Justice before joining the Ministry for Foreign Affairs as an attaché in March 1904. He was first posted to Brussels and The Hague, and in 1906 became second secretary at the Ministry for Foreign Affairs. In 1907 he was appointed counsellor and head of the ministry's Legal Department. In that capacity, he served on the committee preparing Sweden's participation in the Third Hague Peace Conference in 1911. In 1913, Ewerlöf was sent to Paris as acting legation counsellor and later that year was appointed state secretary for foreign affairs, a position he held until 1918. During the First World War, while occupying this particularly important office, he was also a member of the National Swedish Trade Commission (Statens handelskommission) from 1915 to 1917 and secretary of the Nordic ministerial meeting held in Stockholm in 1917.

Ewerlöf was appointed Swedish envoy to Vienna in 1918 and to Budapest in 1920. Sweden and Hungary established diplomatic relations on 12 November 1920, and on 16 February 1921 he presented his credentials to Regent Miklós Horthy as Sweden's first envoy to Hungary. In the difficult post-war conditions of Austria and Hungary, Ewerlöf played a widely appreciated role in Swedish humanitarian relief efforts. He was awarded the Gold Medal of the Swedish Voluntary Medical Service for his contributions. In Vienna, a commemorative medal bearing his likeness was struck in 1922, and the city presented him with an honorary gift in recognition of his work. On 13 April 1923, a formal ceremony was held in the grand Dome Hall of the Hungarian Parliament to honour Ewerlöf upon his departure. Speaking on behalf of the City of Budapest, Councillor Fock expressed warm gratitude for the assistance Sweden had provided to the suffering Hungarian population.

On 18 December 1922, Ewerlöf was appointed Swedish minister to Japan. He arrived in Tokyo in May 1923, where he experienced the Great Kantō Earthquake in September of that year. Although appointed Swedish minister to Tokyo in 1922, he was transferred in 1923 to Beijing. There, he presented his credentials to President Cao Kun on 8 November 1923 and represented Sweden at the Special Conference on the Chinese Customs Tariff in 1925–1926.

From 1929 until his death, Ewerlöf served as Swedish minister in Copenhagen. Following the tradition of his grandfather, Frans Ewerlöf, who had been Swedish-Norwegian Consul General in Copenhagen, he worked actively to promote Nordic cooperation and mutual understanding.

== Personal life ==
Oscar Ewerlöf was a great lover of art, with a particular knowledge of and passion for copper engravings, and his home was filled with antiques. He was unmarried. Ewerlöf's papers were held by his sister, Olga Virgin, the wife of Major General Eric Virgin.

== Death and funeral ==
Gravestone of Oskar Ewerlöf

Ewerlöf died on 22 October 1934 in Copenhagen, Denmark. The previous week, on 15 October, he had undergone kidney surgery, after which his condition deteriorated. On 24 October, his remains were transferred from Bispebjerg Hospital to the chapel of the Swedish Gustaf's Church, where the lying in state ceremony took place. His funeral was held on 26 October 1934 at the Swedish Gustaf's Church in Copenhagen.

King Christian X was represented by Chamberlain Anthonius Krieger. Among the members of the Danish royal family in attendance were Prince Gustav, Prince Axel, and Princess Margaret. Representing the Swedish Ministry for Foreign Affairs was State Secretary for Foreign Affairs Baron Carl Hamilton. Also present were Danish Prime Minister Thorvald Stauning, Foreign Minister Peter Rochegune Munch and his wife Elna Munch, Speaker of the Folketing Hans Rasmussen, Speaker of the Landsting Jørgen Jensen-Klejs, President of the Supreme Court Cosmus Meyer, Lieutenant General Erik With, Vice Admiral Hjalmar Rechnitzer, the entire diplomatic corps, representatives of the Nordic Association, including its chairman Director-General Michael Koefoed and secretary Lieutenant Colonel H. Bruhn, as well as numerous members of the Swedish Legation led by Chargé d'Affaires Knut Richard Thyberg.

The funeral service opened with a double quartet of students from Lund University singing "Integer vitae," followed by the Swedish hymn No. 492, "Låt gråten och klagan få stillna" ("Let Weeping and Lament Cease"). The Reverend Arvid Boman delivered the funeral oration and officiated the burial rite. After the choir performed Jacob Axel Josephson's "Requiem," the burial mass proceeded from the altar. Following the singing of a Danish hymn, the coffin was carried out by eight members of the Swedish colony in Copenhagen to the strains of Chopin's Funeral March. Interment took place immediately afterward at Assistens Cemetery, while the student quartet sang "Stilla skuggor" ("Silent Shadows").

Numerous wreaths were placed around the bier, including one of white chrysanthemums, white lilies, and white carnations from King Gustaf V of Sweden, adorned with broad silk ribbons in the Swedish national colors bearing the king's name. Other wreaths came from King Christian X, Queen Alexandrine of Denmark, Princess Thyra, and Prince Gustav; the Swedish and Danish Ministries of Foreign Affairs; the Polish minister and his wife; the governing board of the Swedish Red Cross; the Registrar of the Permanent Court of International Justice at The Hague, Envoy Åke Hammarskjöld; the Swedish Guild in Copenhagen; Sweden's consuls in Denmark and the staff of the Swedish Legation in Copenhagen; the board of Norges Hus in Copenhagen; Foreningen Norden in Copenhagen; and many others.

== Awards and decorations ==
=== Swedish ===
- (Sweden) King Gustaf V's Jubilee Commemorative Medal (1928)
- (Sweden) Commander Grand Cross of the Order of the Polar Star (16 June 1928)
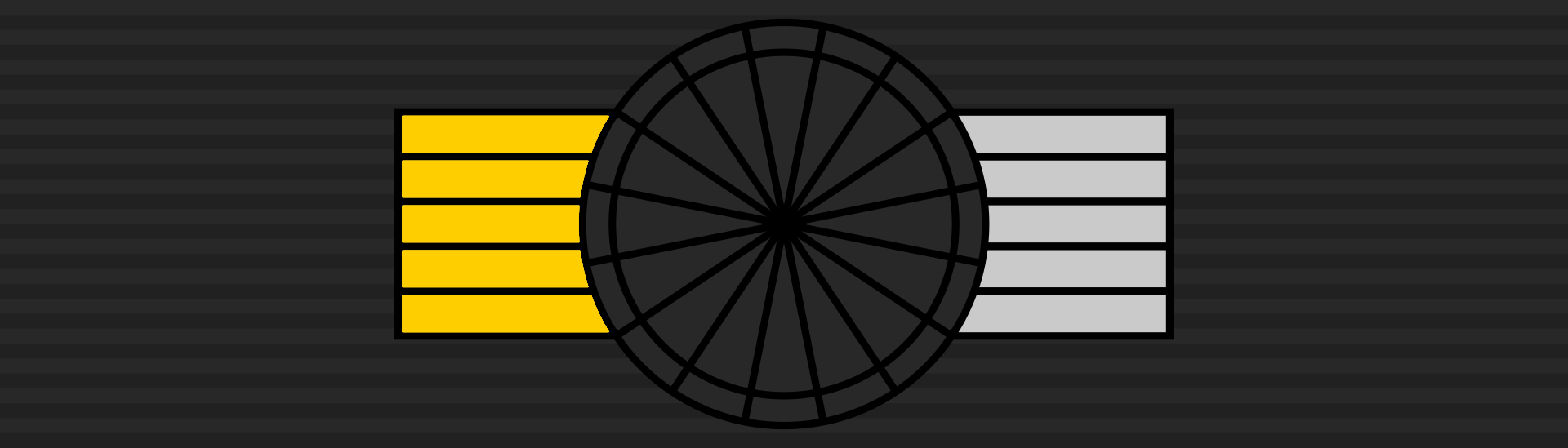
- (Sweden) Commander 1st Class of the Order of the Polar Star (5 June 1920)
- (Sweden) Commander of the Order of the Polar Star (June 1916)
- (Sweden) Knight of the Order of the Polar Star (1910)
- (Sweden) Gold Medal of the Swedish Voluntary Medical Service

=== Foreign ===
- (Iceland) Grand Knight's Cross of the Order of the Falcon (1930)
- (Japan) 1st Class of the Order of the Sacred Treasure (1925 and 1928)
- (Japan) 1st Class of the Order of the Rising Sun (1928 and 1930)
- (Kingdom of Prussia) Knight 1st Class of the Order of the Crown (1918 and 1921)
- (Kingdom of Prussia) Knight 2nd Class of the Order of the Crown (between 1910)
- 1st Class of the Order of the Crown of Thailand (1910 and 1915)
- (Spain) Grand Cross of the Order of Isabella the Catholic (1910 and 1915)
- (Austria) Grand Cross of the Austrian Order of Honor (1928 and 1930)
- (Grand Duchy of Baden) Commander 1st Class of the Order of the Zähringer Lion (between 1910)
- (Denmark) Commander 1st Class of the Order of the Dannebrog (1915 and 1918)
- (Denmark) Commander of the Order of the Dannebrog (1910 and 1915)
- (France) Commander of the Legion of Honour (1910 and 1915)
- (France) Officer of the Legion of Honour (between 1910)
- (Russian Empire) Knight 2nd Class of the Order of Saint Anna (between 1910)
- (Belgium) Knight of the Order of Leopold (between 1910)
- (Portugal) Knight of the Military Order of Christ (between 1910)
- (Chile) Recipient of the Order of Merit (1915 and 1918)

=== Others ===
On 15 June 1921, Ewerlöf was awarded the Decoration of Honor of the University of Vienna "for his aid to students during the war and his donation of books to the university." This was in recognition of the assistance provided to the University of Vienna, its students, and faculty after the First World War to alleviate the humanitarian crisis of the postwar years.

Government offices
Preceded by Fredrik Ramel	State Secretary for Foreign Affairs; 1913–1918	Succeeded by Wollmar Boström
Diplomatic posts
Preceded by Joachim Beck-Friis	Envoy of Sweden to Austria; 1918–1923	Succeeded by Ivan Danielsson
Preceded by None	Envoy of Sweden to Hungary; 1920–1923	Succeeded by Ivan Danielsson
Preceded by David Bergström	Envoy of Sweden to Japan; 1923–1928	Succeeded by Johan Hultman
Preceded by David Bergström	Envoy of Sweden to China; 1923–1928	Succeeded by Johan Hultman
Preceded by Joachim Beck-Friis	Envoy of Sweden to Denmark; 1929–1934	Succeeded by Carl Hamilton af Hageby
