= Birger Johansson (diplomat) =

Swedish diplomat (1887–1975)

- Born: Per Birger Johansson; 3 November 1887; Åby-Klippan, Sweden
- Died: 5 December 1975 (aged 88); Hägersten, Sweden
- Education: Lund University
- Occupation: Diplomat
- Years active: 1911–1953
- Spouse: Signe Thornquist (m. 1917; died 1972)
- Children: 1

Per Birger Johansson (3 November 1887 – 5 December 1975) was a Swedish diplomat who served in the Ministry for Foreign Affairs for over 40 years. After joining the ministry in 1911, he worked in several European cities, including Helsinki, Hamburg, Petrograd, Moscow, Tallinn, and Riga. He advanced from attaché and consul to senior leadership positions, becoming director-general and head of the Personnel and Administrative Department in 1931. In 1935, he was appointed envoy to Riga, Tallinn, and Kaunas, representing Sweden in the Baltic states until the Soviet occupation in 1940 forced the closure of the legations. During World War II, he headed the Foreign Ministry's B Department, which handled the interests of belligerent states after diplomatic relations were broken off. His final post was as envoy to Belgrade from 1948 until his retirement in 1953.

== Early life ==
Johansson was born on 3 November 1887 in Åby-Klippan, Kristianstad County, the son of the freeholder and county council member Per Johansson. He passed studentexamen in Helsingborg in 1907 and went on to earn a degree in administrative studies (kansliexamen) at Lund University in 1910.

== Career ==
After a short period of service at the Swedish Board of Customs (Generaltullstyrelsen) in Stockholm, Johansson entered the Ministry for Foreign Affairs in 1911. He began his diplomatic career as attaché in Helsinki in 1912 and in Hamburg in 1913, before serving as acting second secretary from 1914 to 1916. In 1916 he was posted to Petrograd, and in 1917 he completed his consular examination. That same year he served as acting vice consul in Narvik, followed by assignments as acting consul in Vaasa and Rouen in 1918, and in Mariehamn in 1919.

In 1923 he became consul and head of the Inheritance and Compensation Office (Arvs- och ersättningsbyrån) within the Legal Department of the Foreign Ministry. His career continued to advance with postings as consul in Tallinn in 1925, legation counsellor in Moscow in 1927, and head of department at the Foreign Ministry in 1929. In 1931 he was appointed director-general (utrikesråd) and head of the Personnel and Administrative Department. Four years later, in 1935, he became envoy to Riga, Tallinn, and Kaunas.

In September 1939, following a decision by the Swedish Parliament to establish independent legations in Estonia and Lithuania, Johansson formally presented his letters of recall to the presidents of both countries. The following year, after the Soviet occupation of the Baltic states began on 15 June 1940, Johansson and his wife were evacuated to Stockholm on 23 August aboard the Sveabolaget vessel SS Konung Oscar, along with nearly the entire Swedish community in Riga. Shortly afterwards, on 24 August, Sweden closed its diplomatic missions in Riga, Tallinn, and Kaunas, completing the withdrawal within the set deadline.

Johansson then served as head of the Foreign Ministry's B Department from 1941 to 1948, a wartime unit created to protect the interests of various belligerent states in enemy territories after diplomatic relations had been severed. He later served as envoy in Belgrade from 1948 until January 1953.

== Personal life ==
In 1917, Johansson married Signe Thornquist (1888–1972), daughter of J. A. Thornquist of Halmstad and his wife. The couple had one son, Göran Thornquist (1922–1984).

== Death ==
Johansson died on 5 December 1975. He was registered (kyrkobokförd) in Hägersten, Stockholm Municipality at the time of death.

== Awards and decorations ==
=== Swedish ===
- (Sweden) Commander Grand Cross of the Order of the Polar Star (11 November 1952)
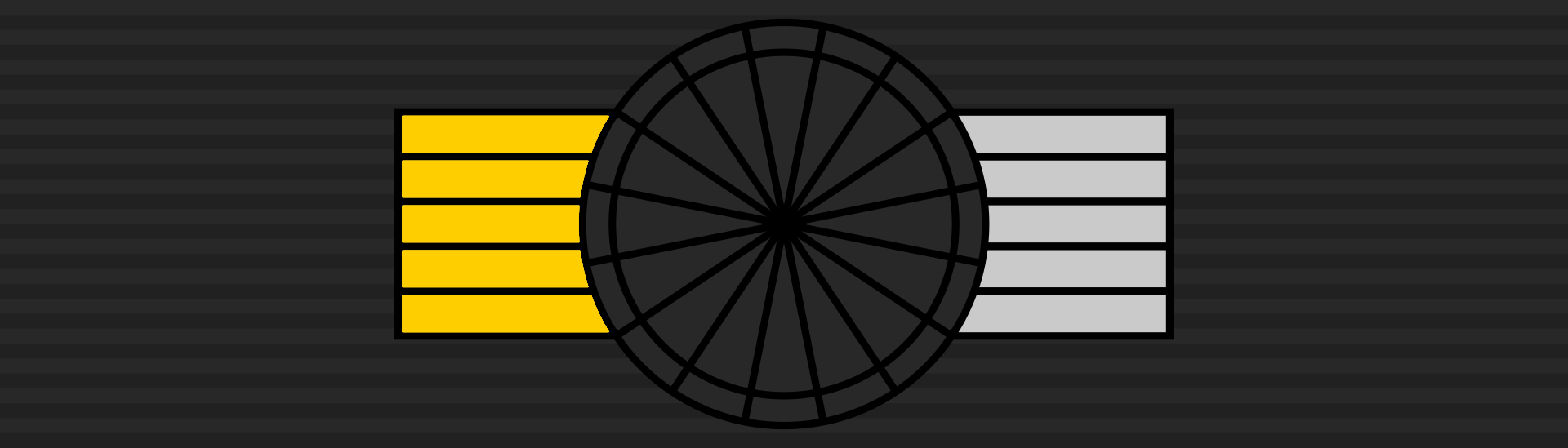
- (Sweden) Commander 1st Class of the Order of the Polar Star (15 November 1937)
- (Sweden) Commander of the Order of the Polar Star (24 November 1934)
- (Sweden) Knight of the Order of the Polar Star (1925)

=== Foreign ===
- (Estonia) 1st Class of the Order of the White Star (between 1940 and 1942)
- Grand Cross of the Order of the Lion of Finland (between 1945 and 1947)
- (Iceland) Grand Cross of the Order of the Falcon (20 December 1947)
- (Socialist Federal Republic of Yugoslavia) 1st Class of the Order of the Yugoslav Flag (15 December 1952)
- (Latvia) Grand Cross of the Order of the Three Stars (between 1935 and 1940)
- (Lithuania) Grand Cross of the Order of the Lithuanian Grand Duke Gediminas (between 1940 and 1942)
- (Netherlands) Knight of the Grand Cross of the Order of Orange-Nassau (14 March 1946)
- (Norway) Grand Cross of the Order of St. Olav (between 1945 and 1947)
- (Hungary) Grand Cross of the Hungarian Order of Merit (1947)
- (Mexico) Grand Cross with Sash, 2nd Class, of the Order of the Aztec Eagle (21 March 1950)
- (Belgium) Grand Officer of the Order of the Crown (February 1947)
- (Bulgaria) Grand Officer of the Order of Civil Merit (between 1948 and 1950)
- Commander 1st Class of the Order of the White Rose of Finland (December 1932)
- (Italy) Grand Officer of the Order of Merit of the Italian Republic (between 1955 and 1962)
- (Kingdom of Romania) Grand Officer of the Order of the Crown of Romania (between 1931 and 1935)
- (France) Commander of the Legion of Honour (between 1948 and 1950)
- (France) Officer of the Legion of Honour (between 1945 and 1947)
- (Finland) 3rd Class of the Order of the Cross of Liberty (between 1921 and 1925)
- (Czechoslovakia) Officer of the Order of the White Lion (between 1925 and 1928)

Diplomatic posts
Preceded by Olof Andreas Hedman	Consul of Sweden in Tallinn; 1925–1927	Succeeded by Gunnar Reuterskiöld
Preceded by Patrik Reuterswärd	Envoy of Sweden to Latvia; 1935–1939	Succeeded by None¹
Preceded by Patrik Reuterswärd	Envoy of Sweden to Estonia; 1935–1939	Succeeded by None¹
Preceded by Patrik Reuterswärd	Envoy of Sweden to Lithuania; 1935–1939	Succeeded by None¹
Preceded by Gunnar Reuterskiöld	Envoy of Sweden to Yugoslavia; 1948–1953	Succeeded by Ole Jödahl
Notes and references
1. None until 1991.
