= List of ambassadors of Sweden to Romania =

Ambassador of Sweden to Romania
- Lesser coat of arms of the Kingdom of Sweden
- Incumbent; Anna Hällerman since 2024
- Ministry for Foreign Affairs; Swedish Embassy, Bucharest
- Style: His or Her Excellency (formal); Mr. or Madam Ambassador (informal)
- Reports to: Minister for Foreign Affairs
- Residence: Șoseaua Kiseleff 43 (Note: The ambassador's residence is at the same location as the chancery.)
- Seat: Bucharest, Romania
- Appointer: Government of Sweden
- Term length: No fixed term
- Formation: 8 April 1914
- First holder: Joachim Beck-Friis
- Website: Swedish Embassy, Bucharest

The Ambassador of Sweden to Romania (known formally as the Ambassador of the Kingdom of Sweden to Romania) is the official representative of the government of Sweden to the president of Romania and government of Romania.

== History ==
On 8 April 1914, Sweden's minister in Vienna, Baron Joachim Beck-Friis, was also appointed as minister to the Romanian court in Bucharest. On 6 May 1914, he was further appointed as minister to the Serbian court. However, Beck-Friis never had the chance to present his credentials before World War I broke out. In March 1916, he traveled to Bucharest to present his credentials to King Ferdinand I of Romania. Beck-Friis and the military attaché, Major af Ström, were received in Bucharest by Foreign Minister Emanoil Porumbaru. On 18 March, Beck-Friis presented his credentials to the King of Romania in a formal audience. From that date, Sweden and Romania officially established diplomatic relations.

The ministerial post in Bucharest was established in 1921, with responsibilities covering not only Romania but also Greece and Yugoslavia. This post was abolished in connection with the cuts to certain positions within the foreign service, as decided by the 1933 parliament. Sweden's minister in Warsaw was subsequently accredited to Bucharest. Two years later, the position of Swedish minister in Bucharest was reinstated when Envoy Patrik Reuterswärd assumed the role of minister to Bucharest (and Sofia) on 1 July of that year.

In January 1951, it was reported that the position of head of mission in Bucharest would be discontinued. The responsibility for Sweden's representation in Romania, Bulgaria, and Hungary would thereafter be divided between Belgrade, Moscow, and Prague, with Sweden being represented in those countries by lower-ranking personnel for the time being. Sweden's minister in Moscow was subsequently accredited to Bucharest.

In February 1962, an agreement was reached between the Swedish and Romanian governments to elevate their respective legations to embassies. As a result, the diplomatic rank was changed from envoy extraordinary and minister plenipotentiary to ambassador. In January 1964, it was proposed that the mission in Bucharest should be granted independent status. The decision to grant the mission in Bucharest independent status and have it led by an ambassador was made by parliament in March 1964.

From 2000 until 2010, when Sweden opened its embassy in Chișinău, Moldova, the Swedish ambassador in Bucharest was also accredited there.

== List of representatives ==
Name	Period	Resident / Non-resident	Title	Resident / Concurrent accreditation	Notes	Presented credentials	Ref
Kingdom of Romania (1881–1947)
Joachim Beck-Friis	8 April 1914 (Note: Jacobson (1922) states the date as 17 August 1915.) – 1918	Non-resident	Envoy extraordinary and minister plenipotentiary	Reisdent in Vienna			
Einar af Wirsén	26 September 1921 – 1924 (Note: On leave from 5 November 1924.)	Resident	Envoy	Also accredited to Athens and Belgrade		March 1922	
Jonas Alströmer	1925–1933	Resident	Acting envoy	Also accredited to Athens and Belgrade (until 1928)			
Einar Hennings	1933–1933	Non-resident	Envoy	Resident in Warsaw		29 November 1933	
Erik Boheman	1934–1935	Non-resident	Envoy	Resident in Warsaw			
Patrik Reuterswärd	1 July 1935 – 1947	Resident	Envoy	Also accredited to Sofia			
Romanian People's Republic (1947–1965) and Socialist Republic of Romania (1965–1989)
Patrik Reuterswärd	1947–1948	Resident	Envoy	Also accredited to Sofia			
Sven Allard	1949–1951	Resident	Envoy	Also accredited to Budapest and Sofia			
Rolf Sohlman	1 September 1951 – 1963	Non-resident	Envoy	Resident in Moscow	Assumed office on 6 October		
Olof Bjurström	1964–1967	Resident	Ambassador				
Carl Johan Rappe	1967–1970	Resident	Ambassador				
Otto Rathsman	1970–1973	Resident	Ambassador				
Lars Hedström	1976–1979	Resident	Ambassador				
Hans Sköld	1979–1982	Resident	Ambassador				
Per Bertil Kollberg	1982–1987	Resident	Ambassador				
Sven Linder	1987–1989	Resident	Ambassador				
Nils Rosenberg	1989 – 28 December 1989	Resident	Ambassador			15 December 1989 (Note: The day before the Romanian revolution started.)	
Romania (1989–present)
Nils Rosenberg	28 December 1989 – 1994	Resident	Ambassador				
Ragnar Ängeby	1994–1997	Resident	Ambassador				
Nils Gunnar Revelius	1997–2001	Resident	Ambassador	Also accredited to Chișinău (from 2000)			
Svante Kilander	2001–2006	Resident	Ambassador	Also accredited to Chișinău			
Mats Åberg	2006–2010	Resident	Ambassador	Also accredited to Chișinău			
Anders Bengtcén	2010–2014	Resident	Ambassador				
Anneli Lindahl Kenny	2014–2019	Resident	Ambassador				
Therese Hydén	1 September 2019 – 2024	Resident	Ambassador				
Anna Hällerman	2024–present	Resident	Ambassador				
