= Einar Hennings =

Swedish diplomat (1884–1965)

Envoy of Sweden to France
- In office 1934–1944
- Preceded by: Albert Ehrensvärd
- Succeeded by: Erik Boheman

Envoy of Sweden to Poland
- In office 1931–1933
- Preceded by: Cossva Anckarsvärd
- Succeeded by: Erik Boheman

Envoy of Sweden to Romania
- In office 1933–1933
- Preceded by: Jonas Alströmer
- Succeeded by: Erik Boheman

State Secretary for Foreign Affairs
- In office 1928–1931
- Preceded by: Erik Sjöborg
- Succeeded by: Carl Hamilton

Envoy of Sweden to Switzerland
- In office 1925–1928
- Preceded by: Jonas Alströmer
- Succeeded by: Karl Ivan Westman

Envoy of Sweden to Hungary
- In office 1925–1928
- Preceded by: Jonas Alströmer
- Succeeded by: Torsten Undén

Envoy of Sweden to Austria
- In office 1925–1928
- Preceded by: Jonas Alströmer
- Succeeded by: Torsten Undén

Personal details
- Born: 2 December 1884 Eskilstuna, Sweden
- Died: 10 December 1965 (aged 81) Stockholm, Sweden
- Resting place: Norra begravningsplatsen
- Spouse: Gudrun Fosterud (m. 1915; died 1953)
- Children: 1
- Education: Norra Latin; Uppsala University
- Occupation: Diplomat

Einar Hennings (2 December 1884 – 10 December 1965) was a Swedish diplomat who began his career in the legal and civil service before moving into senior government positions. After studying law at Uppsala University, he served in various judicial districts and at the Stockholm City Court before joining the Ministry of Finance in 1912. His work preparing for the introduction of the tobacco monopoly brought him recognition and contributed to his appointment in 1920 as state secretary and directors-general for administrative affairs at the newly established Ministry of Commerce and Industry.

From 1923 to 1925, Hennings participated in negotiations for trade and maritime agreements with the Soviet Union, Poland, Czechoslovakia and Thailand. In 1925, he was appointed Swedish envoy to Switzerland, Austria and Hungary, representing Sweden at several international conferences in Geneva, including discussions on arms trade, social policy and disarmament. He returned to Stockholm in 1928 to serve as state secretary for foreign affairs until 1931.

Hennings subsequently served as Swedish envoy to Poland from 1931 and Romania from 1933, before being appointed minister in Paris in 1934. During his tenure in France, he followed the French government from Bordeaux to Vichy during the Second World War. There, he protested against the deportation of Russian citizens to Germany and the persecution and deportation of Jews, while reporting these actions to the Swedish Ministry for Foreign Affairs. He left Vichy in 1943, returned to Sweden, and resigned from his diplomatic post in 1944.

== Early life ==
Hennings was born on 2 December 1884 in Eskilstuna City Parish, in Eskilstuna, Sweden, the son of Mayor William Hennings and his wife, Valborg (née Dahlström). His paternal uncle was the agronomist Rudolph Hennings (1841–1921), and his cousin was the politician and historian Beth Hennings (1889–1971).

Hennings graduated from Norra Latin in Stockholm in 1903 and obtained a Candidate of Laws degree from Uppsala University in 1907.

== Career ==
Hennings began his legal career by undertaking court service in various judicial districts from 1908 to 1910, followed by an appointment as a clerk at the Stockholm City Court in 1911. In 1912, he joined the Ministry of Finance as an assistant official, becoming its first administrative officer (kanslisekreterare) in 1917 and state secretary in 1920. Hennings's career advanced significantly through his work in preparing for the introduction of the tobacco monopoly. Serving as an assistant to Justice Axel Borgström, he gained valuable experience in commercial affairs, which helped qualify him for senior government office. In 1920, following a period as state secretary at the Ministry of Finance, he was appointed state secretary and directors-general for administrative affairs (expeditionschef) at the newly established Ministry of Commerce and Industry.

During the following years, Hennings represented the Swedish government on several commissions tasked with negotiating trade and maritime agreements with foreign powers. Between 1923 and 1924, he participated in negotiations concerning a trade treaty with the Soviet Union, followed by negotiations with Poland in 1924 and Czechoslovakia and Thailand in 1925. He also served as an expert on various government committees, including an inquiry into the retention of the trade division within the Ministry for Foreign Affairs. He advocated reorganising the division, provisionally, into an office primarily responsible for commercial information.

In 1925, Hennings was appointed envoy to Switzerland, Austria and Hungary, with his headquarters in Bern. He presented his credentials in Bern in November 1925 and to Austrian President Michael Hainisch in January 1926. In his diplomatic capacity, he represented Sweden in Geneva at the 1925 Arms Trade Conference, the Eighth and Ninth International Conferences on Social Policy in 1926, and the League of Nations' Preparatory Commission for Disarmament.

In 1928, Hennings was recalled to Stockholm and appointed state secretary for foreign affairs, a position he held until 1931. That year, he was appointed envoy to Warsaw, presenting his credentials to Polish President Ignacy Mościcki on 2 December 1931. From 1933 to 1934, he also served as envoy to Bucharest, presenting his credentials to King Carol II on 29 November 1933. In 1934, Hennings was appointed Swedish minister in Paris. In 1935, he was appointed honorary chairman of the Swedish Chamber of Commerce in France.

During his diplomatic service in France, Hennings followed the French government, along with other members of the diplomatic corps in Paris, first to Bordeaux and subsequently to Vichy. During his time in Vichy, he met with French leader Pierre Laval and delivered a personal protest against the deportation of Russian citizens to Germany. He also protested against the ongoing deportations of Jews and sent reports to the Swedish Ministry for Foreign Affairs documenting measures taken against Jewish people.

Following the Allied landings in North Africa in November 1942 and the subsequent German occupation of southern France, Hennings left Vichy. From the spring of 1943, he was staying in Sweden. He resigned from his diplomatic post in the autumn of 1944, following a decade marked by considerable upheaval in France. In 1945, he was placed at the government's disposal.

== Personal life ==
Hennings married Gudrun Fosterud (1891–1953) on 17 December 1915 at Hotel Kronprinsen in Stockholm. She was the daughter of estate owner Pehr Fosterud and Ellen Broocman. They had one child, Lennart Hennings (1919–1993), who served as a consul general in Rio de Janeiro and minister at the Swedish embassy in Rome.

== Death ==
Hennings died on 10 December 1965 in Gustaf Vasa Parish in Stockholm, Sweden. He was interred on 21 December 1965 at Norra begravningsplatsen in Stockholm.

== Awards and decorations ==
=== Swedish ===
- (Sweden) King Gustaf V's Jubilee Commemorative Medal (1928)
- (Sweden) Commander Grand Cross of the Order of the Polar Star (6 June 1935)
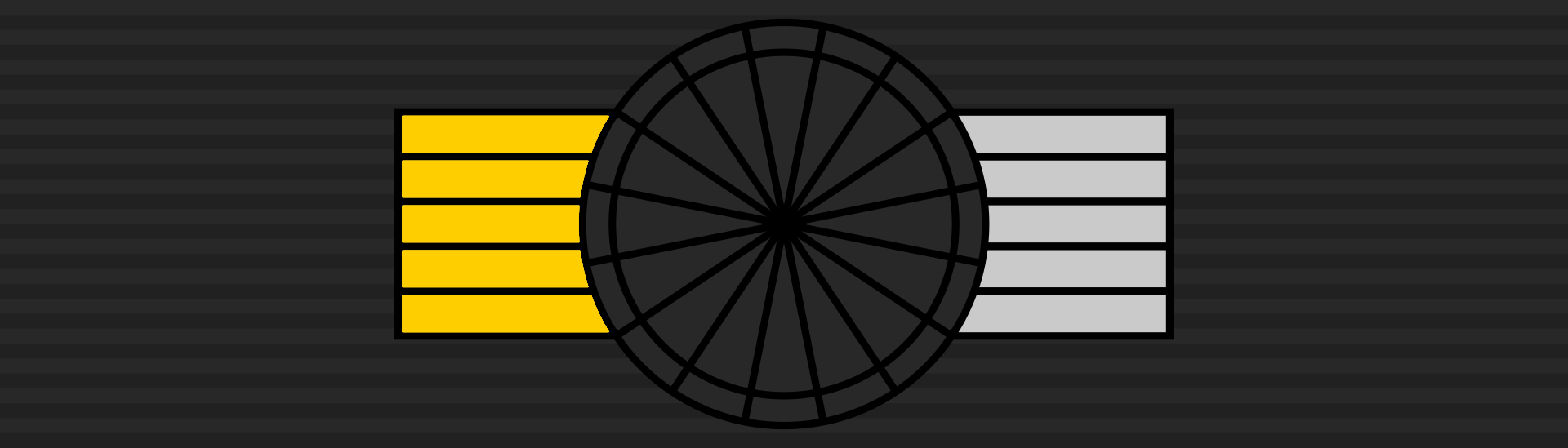
- (Sweden) Commander 1st Class of the Order of the Polar Star (6 June 1927)
- (Sweden) Commander of the Order of the Polar Star (6 June 1923)
- (Sweden) Knight of the Order of the Polar Star (1920)

=== Foreign ===
- (Latvia) Grand Cross of the Order of the Three Stars (between 1928 and 1930)
- (Poland) Grand Cross of the Order of Polonia Restituta (between 1931 and 1935)
- (Poland) Commander 1st Class of the Order of Polonia Restituta (between 1925 and 1928)
- (Kingdom of Romania) Grand Cross of the Order of the Crown of Romania (between 1931 and 1935)
- (Spain) Grand Cross of the Order of Civil Merit (between 1928 and 1930)
- (Kingdom of Hungary) 1st Class of the Hungarian Cross of Merit (between 1928 and 1930)
- Grand Cross of the Decoration of Honour for Services to the Republic of Austria (September 1928)
- (France) Grand Officer of the Legion of Honour (between 1935 and 1940)

Government offices
| Preceded by Erik Sjöborg | State Secretary for Foreign Affairs; 1928–1931 | Succeeded by Carl Hamilton |
Diplomatic posts
| Preceded by Jonas Alströmer | Envoy of Sweden to Switzerland; 1925–1928 | Succeeded by Karl Ivan Westman |
| Preceded by Jonas Alströmer | Envoy of Sweden to Hungary; 1925–1928 | Succeeded by Torsten Undén |
| Preceded by Jonas Alströmer | Envoy of Sweden to Austria; 1925–1928 | Succeeded by Torsten Undén |
| Preceded by Cossva Anckarsvärd | Envoy of Sweden to Poland; 1931–1933 | Succeeded by Erik Boheman |
| Preceded by Jonas Alströmer | Envoy of Sweden to Romania; 1933–1933 | Succeeded by Erik Boheman |
| Preceded by Albert Ehrensvärd | Envoy of Sweden to France; 1934–1944 | Succeeded by Erik Boheman |
