= Torsten Undén =

Swedish diplomat (1877–1962)

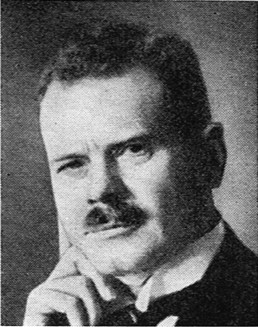
- Born: Ulf Torsten Undén; 14 April 1877; Vetlanda, Sweden
- Died: 5 June 1962 (aged 85); Stockholm, Sweden
- Education: Lund University; Uppsala University
- Occupation: Diplomat
- Years active: 1902–1942
- Spouse: Gerda von Paraski (m. 1918)
- Relatives: Östen Undén (brother); Olof Kaijser (cousin)

Ulf Torsten Undén (14 April 1877 – 5 June 1962) was a Swedish diplomat who served in key posts across Europe and the United States. Beginning his career in Hamburg, he held positions in New York City, Washington, D.C., and Berlin before becoming Consul General in Hamburg in 1913. He played an important role in reorganizing Sweden's diplomatic and consular service and held senior administrative posts at the Ministry for Foreign Affairs. Undén was appointed envoy to Riga and Tallinn in 1921, with accreditation extended to Kaunas in 1922, and later served as envoy to Vienna, Budapest, and Belgrade, remaining in Budapest until his retirement in 1942.

== Early life ==
Undén was born on 14 April 1877 in Vetlanda, Sweden, the son of the pharmacist Viktor Undén (1844–1923) and his wife Beate Kaijser (1854–1944). He had many siblings, including Foreign Minister Östen Undén (1886–1974), chief engineer Hans Undén (1888–1953), bank director Göran Undén (1884–1955), and the artist Margaretha ("Greta") Gullström (1879–1980).

After completing his secondary education in Karlstad in 1897, Undén studied at Uppsala University, where he was a member of the Värmland student nation. He received a Bachelor of Arts degree from the university in 1902. After serving as an attaché at the Consulate General in Hamburg from 1902 to 1904, he pursued legal studies at Lund University, where he obtained an administrative degree (kansliexamen) in 1904 and a civil service degree in law (hovrättsexamen) in 1905.

== Career ==
Undén served as acting vice consul in Hamburg in 1905, acting first secretary at the Ministry for Foreign Affairs in 1906, vice consul in New York City in 1908, and acting legation secretary in Washington, D.C., later that same year. In 1909 he became counsellor at the legation in Berlin. From 1912 to 1913, he served as an expert in the reorganization of the diplomatic and consular service, and in 1913 he was appointed consul general in Hamburg. He was a member of the State Trade Commission (Statens handelskommission) from 1917 to 1918 and served on the committee for the reorganization of the Ministry for Foreign Affairs and Sweden's representation abroad from 1918 to 1921. During this period, he was also acting head of the ministry's Personnel and Administrative Department (1919–1921) and briefly acting head of its Legal Department in 1921.

In 1921, he was appointed envoy to Riga and Tallinn, with accreditation extended to Kaunas in 1922. At the first meeting of the Swedish–Lithuanian Association on 8 May 1925, Undén was elected an honorary member.

In 1928, he was appointed envoy to Vienna, Budapest, and Belgrade. Following the German occupation of Austria in 1938, he served as envoy in Budapest and Belgrade, and from 1939 to 1942 solely in Budapest, before retiring in the latter year.

== Personal life ==
In 1918, Undén married Gerda von Paraski (1888–1987), daughter of Prussian Army Captain Albert von Paraski and Gerda von Manteuffel-Hohenwardin.

He resided at Love Manor in Flen.

Undén was described by Elsa Björkman-Goldschmidt as a cultured, intellectually broad, and principled man with a deep interest in literature, especially Swedish poetry. He was devoted to his homeland and traditions, valuing culture and language, and maintaining strong moral integrity. Despite challenges, he remained dignified, thoughtful, and hospitable.

== Death ==
Undén died on 5 June 1962. He was given a funeral service on 12 June 1962 at the Northern Crematorium at Norra begravningsplatsen in Stockholm, officiated by Assistant Pastor Alvar Cedermark. He was interred on 16 June 1962 in the family grave at the Western Cemetery in Karlstad.

== Awards and decorations ==
=== Swedish ===
- (Sweden) King Gustaf V's Jubilee Commemorative Medal (1928)
- (Sweden) Commander Grand Cross of the Order of the Polar Star (22 November 1932)
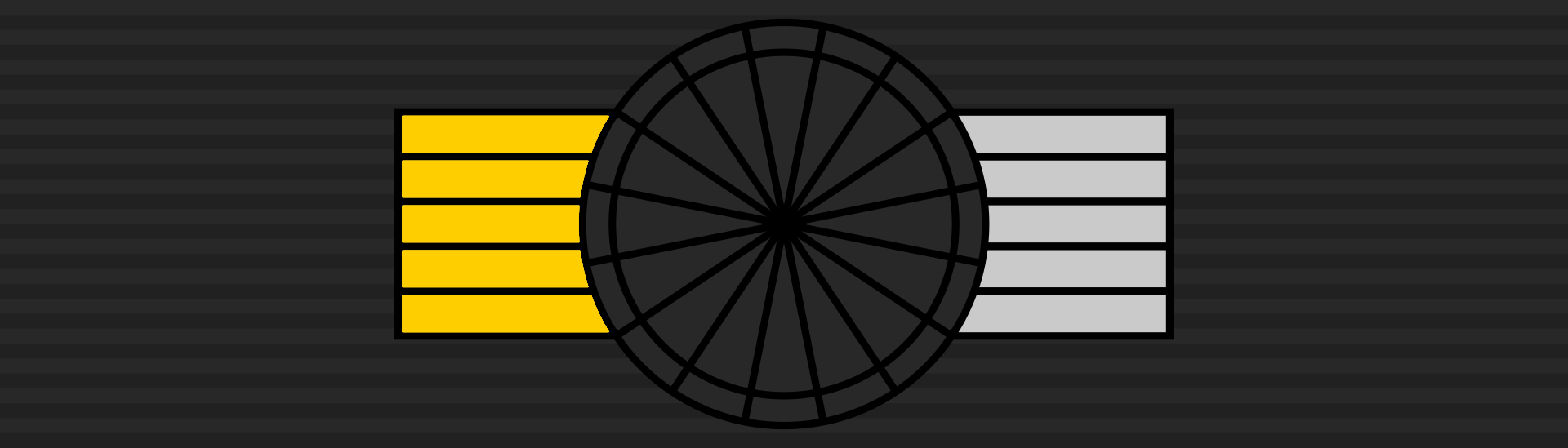
- (Sweden) Commander 1st Class of the Order of the Polar Star (23 September 1924)
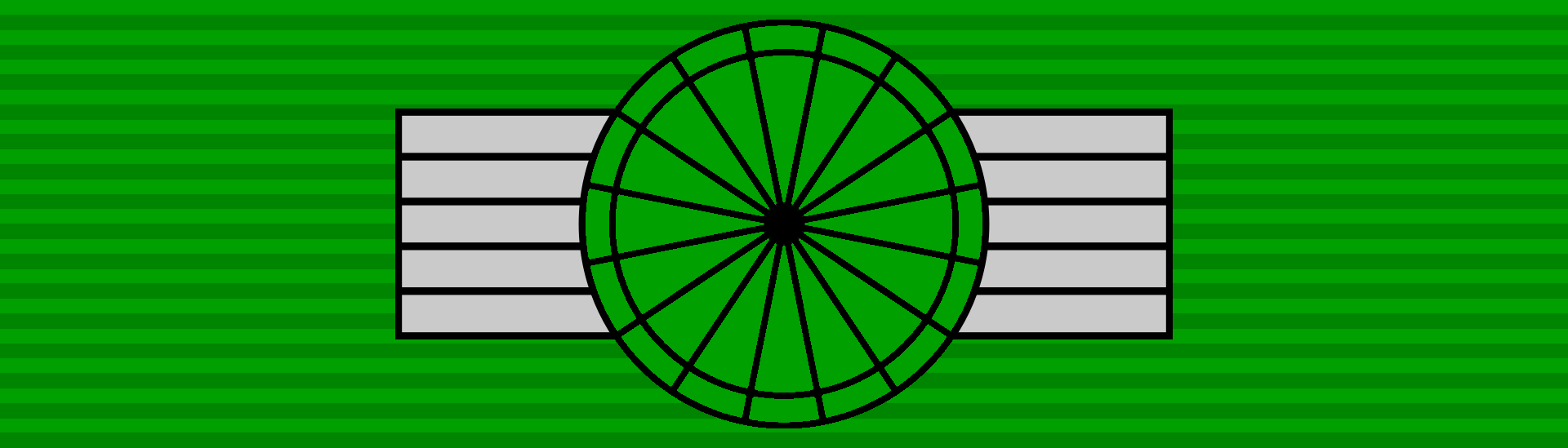
- (Sweden) Commander of the Order of Vasa (6 June 1919)

=== Foreign ===
- (Socialist Federal Republic of Yugoslavia) Grand Cross of the Order of St. Sava
- (Latvia) Grand Cross of the Order of the Three Stars
- (Lithuania) Grand Cross of the Order of the Lithuanian Grand Duke Gediminas
- (Kingdom of Romania) Grand Officer of the Order of the Crown of Romania
- (Estonia) 1st Class of the Cross of Liberty (June 1925)
- (Russia) Knight 2nd Class of the Order of Saint Stanislaus
- (Kingdom of Prussia) Knight 3rd Class of the Order of the Red Eagle
- (Spain) Knight of the Order of Charles III
- Decoration of Honour for Services to the Republic of Austria

== Bibliography ==
- Undén, Torsten (1961). Öden: sex fragmentariska berättelser [Destinies: six fragmentary stories] (in Swedish). Stockholm: Norstedt (distr.). SELIBR 1238748.
- Undén, Torsten (1935). Vid vägranden: dikter [At the edge of the road: poems] (in Swedish). Stockholm: Bonnier. SELIBR 1803482.
- Undén, Torsten (1900). Maj: en Uppsalabagatell [May: an Uppsala trifle] (in Swedish). Stockholm: Bonnier. SELIBR 1645716.

Diplomatic posts
Preceded by Malte Ameen	Consul General of Sweden to Hamburg; 1913–1919	Succeeded by Axel Stridbeck as Acting Consul General
Preceded by None	Envoy of Sweden to Latvia; 1921–1928	Succeeded by Patrik Reuterswärd
Preceded by None	Envoy of Sweden to Estonia; 1921–1928	Succeeded by Patrik Reuterswärd
Preceded by None	Envoy of Sweden to Lithuania; 1922–1928	Succeeded by Patrik Reuterswärd
Preceded by Jonas Alströmer	Envoy of Sweden to Hungary; 1928–1942	Succeeded by Ivan Danielsson
Preceded by Jonas Alströmer	Envoy of Sweden to Yugoslavia; 1928–1939	Succeeded by Folke Malmar
Preceded by Einar Hennings	Envoy of Sweden to Austria; 1928–1938	Succeeded by None
