= List of ambassadors of Sweden to Latvia =

Ambassador of Sweden to Latvia
- Lesser coat of arms of the Kingdom of Sweden

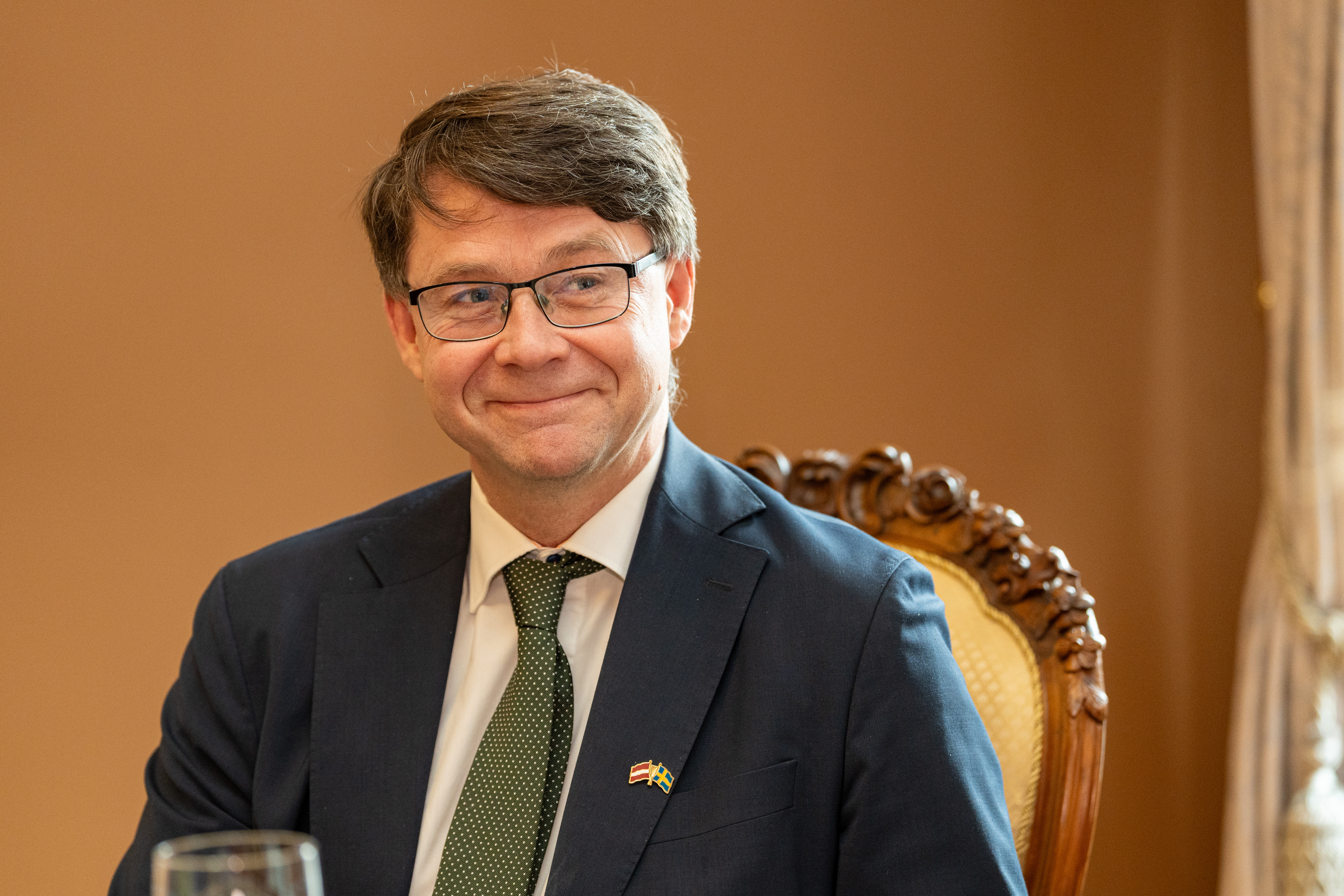
- Incumbent; Daniel Olsson since 2025
- Ministry for Foreign Affairs; Swedish Embassy, Riga
- Style: His or Her Excellency (formal); Mr. or Madam Ambassador (informal)
- Reports to: Minister for Foreign Affairs
- Seat: Riga, Latvia
- Appointer: Government of Sweden
- Term length: No fixed term
- Inaugural holder: Torsten Undén
- Formation: 1921
- Website: Swedish Embassy, Riga

The Ambassador of Sweden to Latvia (known formally as the Ambassador of the Kingdom of Sweden to the Republic of Latvia) is the official representative of the government of Sweden to the president of Latvia and government of Latvia.

== History ==
A Swedish consulate was established in Riga in 1776, and its jurisdiction was expanded several times during the 19th century. It became a paid consulate in 1881, had its district extended in 1903, and was converted into a vice-consulate in 1906. In 1913, the Swedish Parliament approved the reestablishment of the consulate. The consulate was closed in 1924. Three years earlier, in 1921, Sweden opened a legation in Riga.

On 4 February 1921, it was announced that the King in Council had recognized the Republic of Latvia as an independent and sovereign state. Later that summer, a chargé d'affaires ad interim was appointed to head the consulate in Tallinn, which functioned as a legation during the interwar period. On 30 September 1921, Torsten Undén was appointed Sweden's first minister in Riga and Tallinn. After just one year, the legation was relocated to Riga, and the mission in Tallinn was downgraded to a consulate under the Riga embassy. The head of mission in Riga thus became accredited in Tallinn as well.

In September 1939, Sweden's envoy to Riga, Tallinn, and Kaunas, Birger Johansson, presented his letters of recall to the Estonian and Lithuanian presidents after that year's regular session of the Swedish Parliament approved the proposal for independent legations in Estonia and Lithuania. On 15 June 1940, the Soviet Union began its occupation of the Baltic states. On 24 August 1940, Sweden closed its diplomatic missions in Riga, Tallinn, and Kaunas, with a deadline of 25 August to complete the withdrawal.

In 1989, Sweden opened a branch office in Riga under the Consulate General in Leningrad, managed by a consul. On 27 August 1991, the Swedish government decided to reestablish diplomatic relations with Latvia. The agreement took effect the following day, 28 August.

The new Swedish embassy in Riga was inaugurated on 29 August 1991, in a ceremony officiated by Minister of Justice Laila Freivalds.

== List of representatives ==
Name	Period	Title	Notes	Presented credentials	Ref
Einar af Wirsén	24 June 1921 – December 1921	Chargé d'affaires ad interim	Also in Tallinn.		
Torsten Undén	1921–1928	Envoy	Also accredited to Tallinn and Kaunas (from 1922).		
Patrik Reuterswärd	13 June 1928 – 1935	Envoy	Also accredited to Tallinn and Kaunas.		
Herbert Ribbing	30 April – 2 June 1929	Chargé d'affaires ad interim (Note: With diplomatic rank of first legation secretary.)	Also in Tallinn and Kovno.		
Herbert Ribbing	15 November – 1 December 1929	Chargé d'affaires ad interim	Also in Tallinn and Kovno.		
Birger Johansson	1935 – September 1939	Envoy	Also accredited to Tallinn and Kaunas.	12 July 1935	
No head of mission between 1940 and 1991
Lars Fredén	1991–1991	Chargé d'affaires	Consul 1989–1991.		
Vidar Hellners	1991–1992	Ambassador			
Andreas Ådahl	1992–1996	Ambassador			
Hans Magnusson	1996–2000	Ambassador			
Tomas Bertelman	2000–2003	Ambassador			
Göran Håkansson	2003–2008	Ambassador			
Mats Staffanson	2008–2013	Ambassador			
Henrik Landerholm	2013–2017	Ambassador			
Annika Jagander	1 September 2017 – 2020	Ambassador			
Karin Höglund	September 2020 – 2025	Ambassador		22 September 2020	
Daniel Olsson	2025–present	Ambassador		18 August 2025	

== Gallery ==
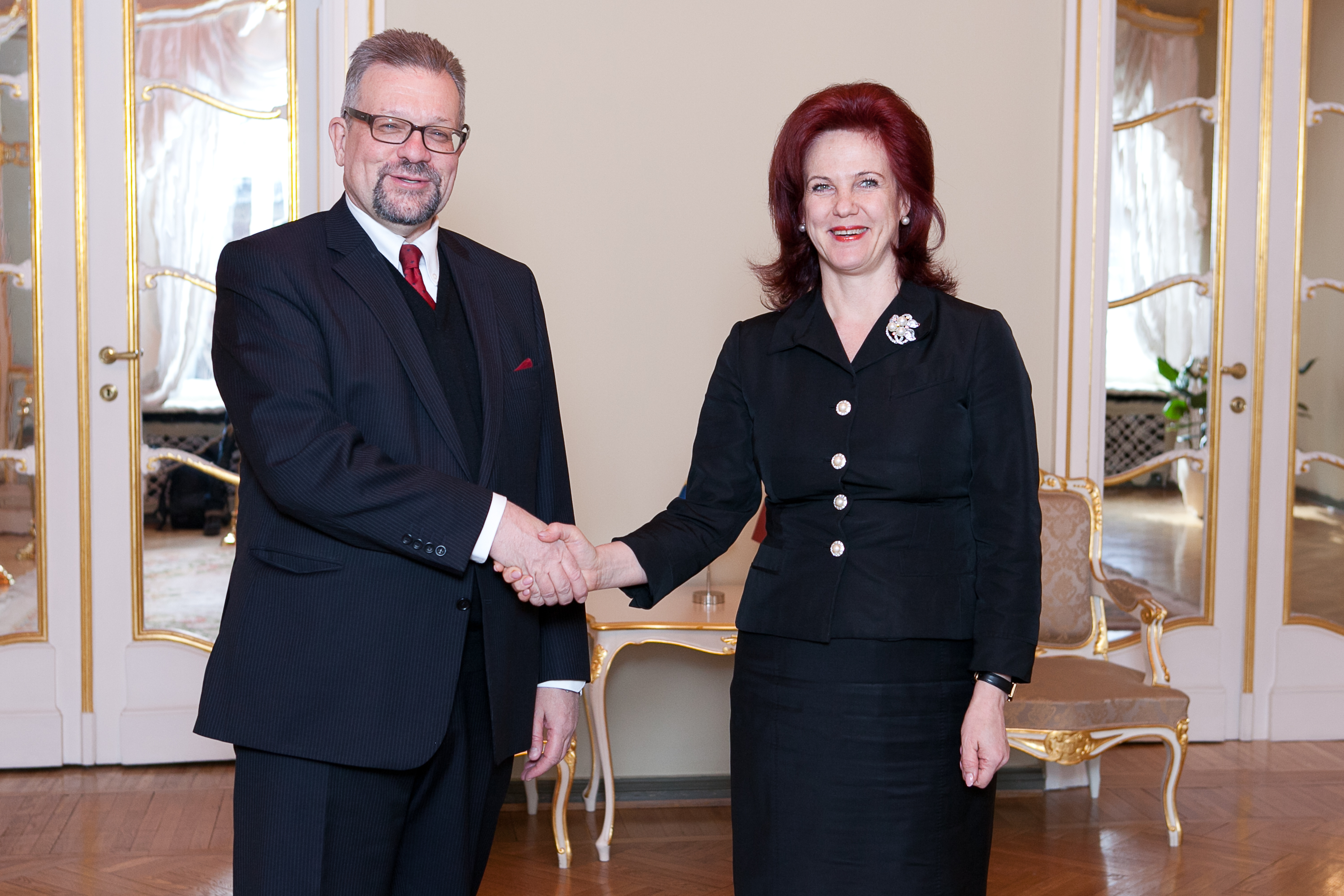
Ambassador Mats Staffanson (2008–2013) with the Speaker of the Saeima Solvita Āboltiņa.

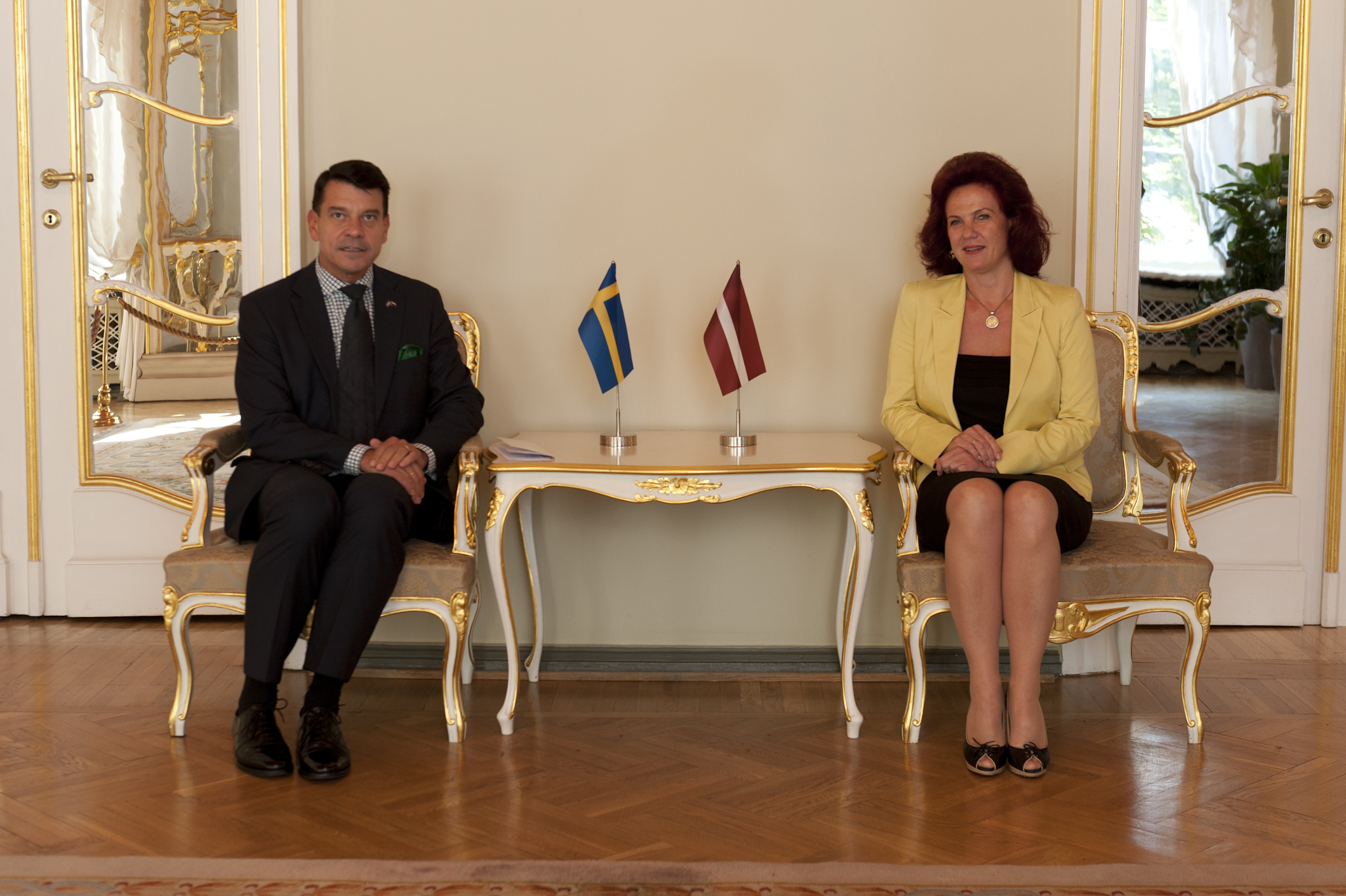
Ambassador Henrik Landerholm (2013–2017) with the Speaker of the Saeima Solvita Āboltiņa.

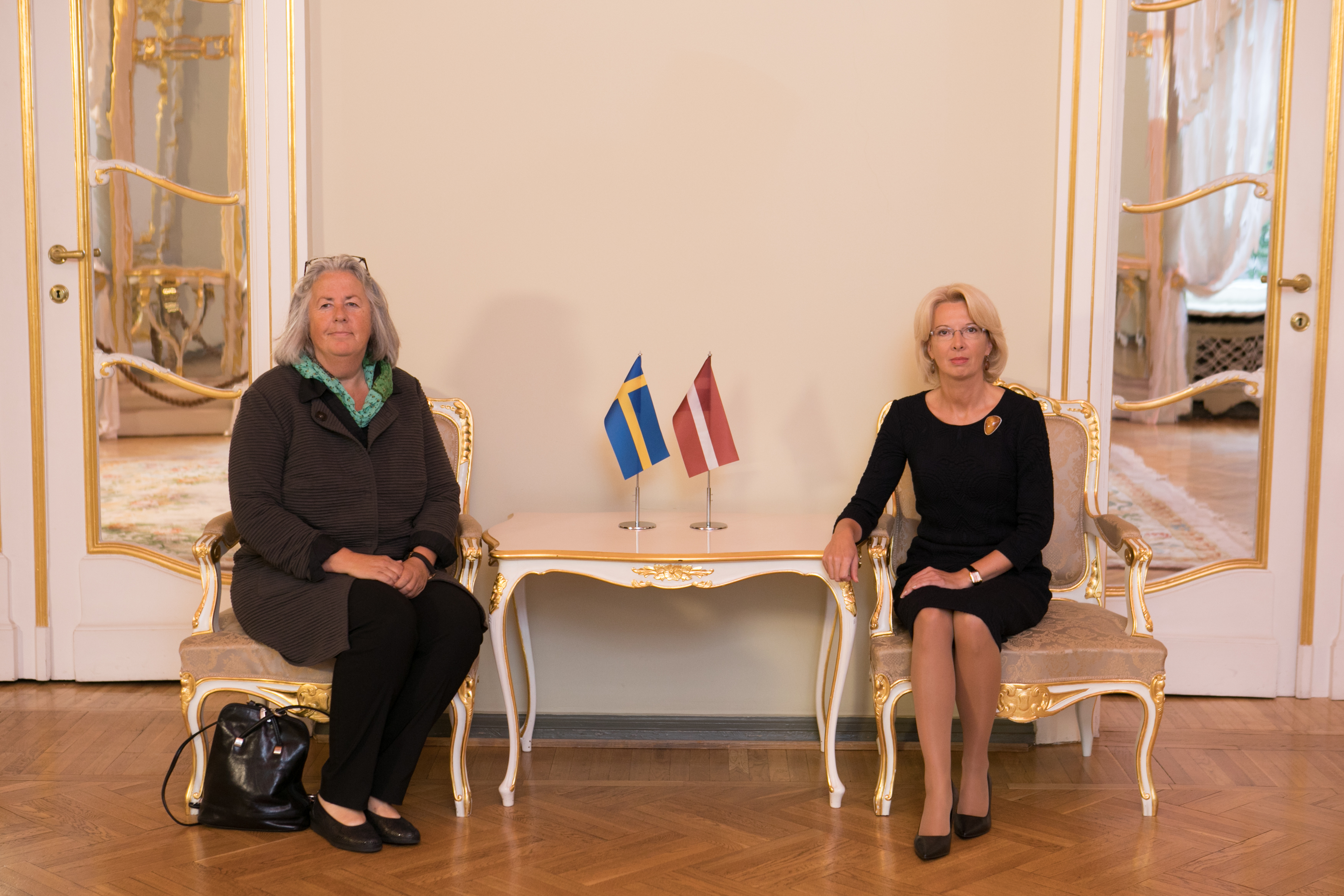
Ambassador Annika Jagander (2017–2020) with the Speaker of the Saeima Ināra Mūrniece.

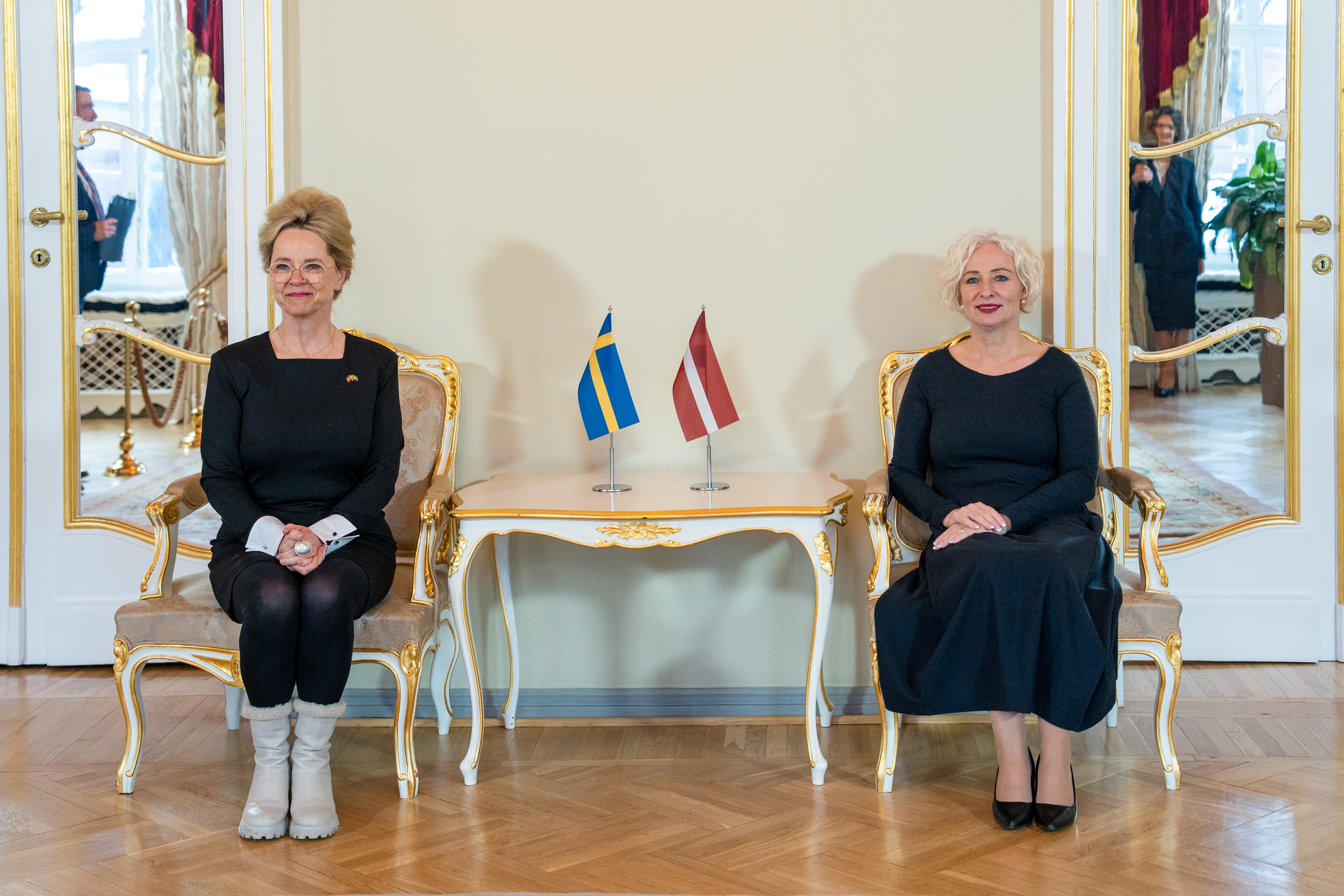
Ambassador Karin Höglund (2020–2025) with the Speaker of the Saeima Daiga Mieriņa.

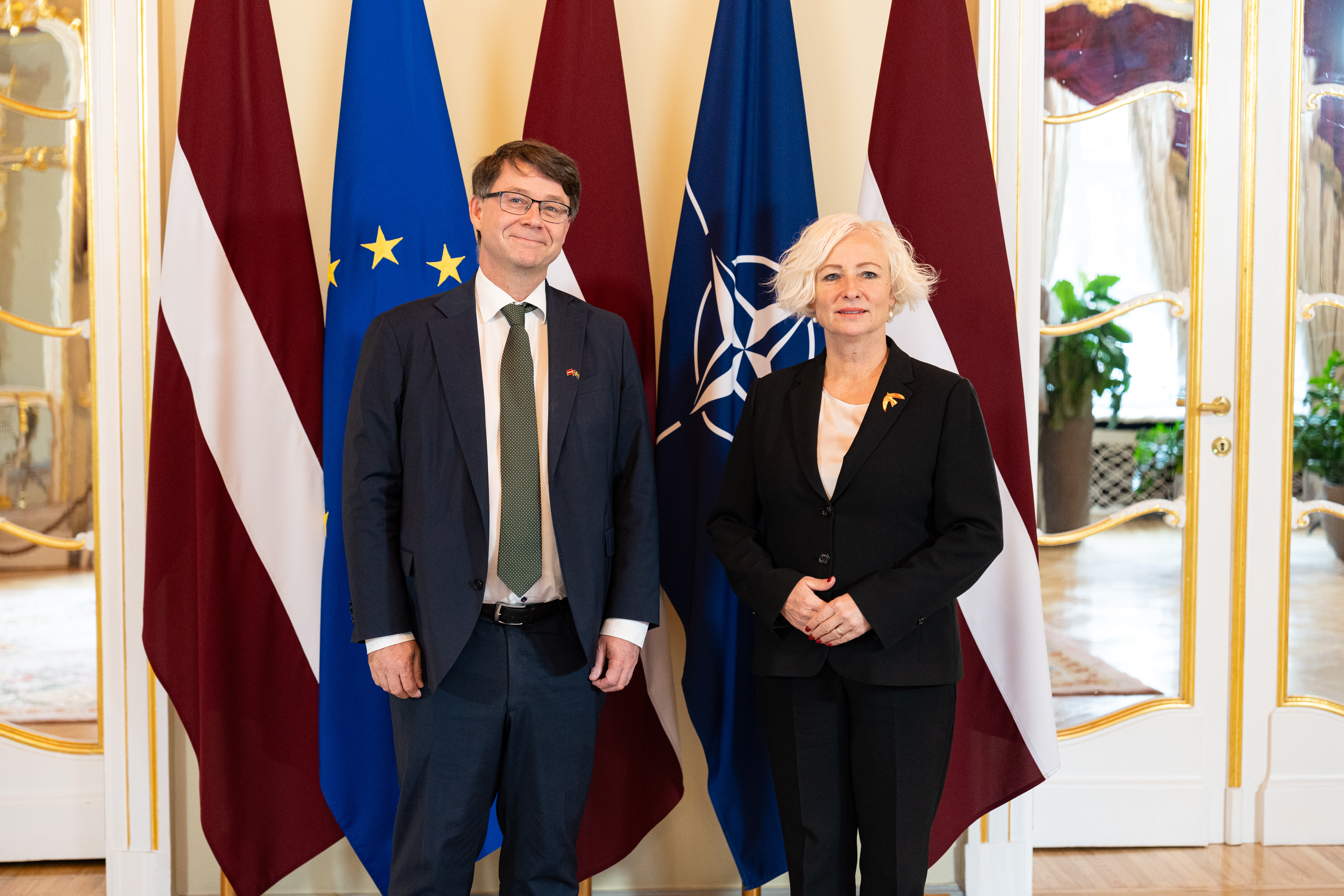
Ambassador Daniel Olsson (2025–present) with the Speaker of the Saeima Daiga Mieriņa.

== See also ==
- Latvia–Sweden relations
