= List of ambassadors of Sweden to Austria =

Ambassador of Sweden to Austria
- Lesser coat of arms of the Kingdom of Sweden
- Incumbent; Annika Ben David since 2025
- Ministry for Foreign Affairs; Swedish Embassy, Vienna
- Style: His or Her Excellency (formal); Mr. or Madam Ambassador (informal)
- Reports to: Minister for Foreign Affairs
- Residence: Palais Szeps, Liechtensteinstraße 51 (Note: The ambassador's residence is located at the same place as the chancery.)
- Seat: Vienna, Austria
- Appointer: Government of Sweden
- Term length: No fixed term
- Formation: 1651
- Website: Swedish Embassy, Vienna

The Ambassador of Sweden to Austria (known formally as the Ambassador of the Kingdom of Sweden to the Republic of Austria) is the official representative of the government of Sweden to the president of Austria and government of Austria.

== History ==
Swedish representation in various forms has existed in Vienna since the 17th century. In 1651, three years after the end of the Thirty Years' War, the first Swedish legation in Vienna was opened.

In April 1938, the King in Council decreed that the Swedish minister in Vienna should, for the time being, relocate his residence and the legation's chancery to Budapest, Hungary. During the war, a Swedish consul was based in Vienna. It wasn't until 1946, when Jens Malling was appointed chargé d'affaires, that the Swedish legation was reopened. From 1951, a Swedish envoy was once again based in Vienna.

In August 1956, an agreement was reached between the Swedish and Austrian governments on the mutual elevation of the respective countries' legations to embassies. The diplomatic rank was thereafter changed to ambassador instead of envoy extraordinary and minister plenipotentiary. Sven Allard, the envoy there, was appointed as Sweden's ambassador to Vienna.

== List of representatives ==
Name	Period	Title	Resident / Concurrent accreditation	Notes	Presented credentials	Ref
Holy Roman Empire (–1806)
Carl Gustaf Oxenstierna af Södermöre	1684 – 13 March 1686	Envoy extraordinary and minister plenipotentiary		Died in office		
Ture Gabriel Bielke	10 May 1719 – 27 February 1721	Minister				
Georg Vilhelm von Höpken	23 May 1719 – 1725	Resident				
Charles Emil Lewenhaupt	1720–1722	Envoy en mission spéciale				
Carl Gustaf Tessin	1725–?	Envoy				
Carl Vilhelm von Krassow	1728–1733	Envoy		Partly in Vienna, partly in Dresden.		
Carl Gustaf Tessin	1735–1736	Envoy				
Caspar Joachim Ringwicht	1738–1742	Minister				
Nils von Röök	1742–1747	Chargé d'affaires				
Nils Bark	22 July 1747 – 21 September 1781	Envoy				
Lars von Engeström	7 November 1782 – 1787	Chargé d'affaires				
Ulric Celsing	19 April 1787 – 2 June 1789	Envoy				
Knut Reinhold Bildt	1789–1791	Chargé d'affaires				
Johan Fredrik von Nolcken	15 February 1791 – 16 June 1794	Envoy extraordinary				
Knut Reinhold Bildt	1794–1796	Chargé d'affaires				
Lars von Engeström	17 July 1795	Envoy		Never took office. (Note: Lars von Engeström did not assume his post in Vienna in 1795 because the Austrian emperor refused to accept him as the new envoy. This rejection was influenced by accusations of "Jacobism" against Engeström, largely fueled by the envoys of Russia and England, who used their influence in Vienna to discredit him. Although these accusations were largely unfounded, they stemmed from Engeström's long-standing sympathies for French culture and his perceived opposition to England's policies. The incident highlights the geopolitical tensions and influence struggles of the time.)		
Fredrik Samuel Silverstolpe	1796–1802	Chargé d'affaires				
Jacob Gustaf De la Gardie	24 August 1799 – 7 August 1801	Envoy extraordinary and minister plenipotentiary				
Gustaf Mauritz Armfelt	17 September 1802 – 30 October 1804	Envoy				
Austrian Empire (1804–1867)
Gustaf von Düben	1805–1810	Envoy				
Carl Bunge	1810 – 21 August 1812	Minister		Died in office		
Christian Bernhard Hegardt	1812–1816	Chargé d'affaires				
Gustaf Löwenhielm	1815–1818	Minister				
Nils Fredric Palmstjerna	23 September 1818 – 1820	Envoy extraordinary and minister plenipotentiary				
Olof Nordenfeldt	1820–1821	Chargé d'affaires				
Elias Lagerheim	30 April 1821 – 1824	Chargé d'affaires		In Dresden and Vienna.		
Carl Johan Didrik Ulrik Croneborg	1824–1827	Chargé d'affaires				
Carl Gustaf Löwenhielm	4 July 1827 – 1843	Envoy extraordinary and minister plenipotentiary	Also accredited to Munich on 28 August			
Carl August (Järla) Hierta	1842–?	Chargé d'affaires ad interim				
Carl Hochschild	19 June 1845 – 1850	Envoy				
Carl August (Järla) Hierta	22 April 1850 – 4 March 1852	Chargé d'affaires	Also accredited to Munich			
Carl von und zu Mansbach	1851–1855	Envoy				
Ludvig Manderström	30 May 1855 – 1856	Envoy ad interim				
Wilhelm af Wetterstedt	8 February 1856 – 1856	Chargé d'affaires ad interim				
Frederik Anton Ferdinand Hartwig Wedel-Jarlsberg	1856–1858	Envoy				
Frederik Due	1858–1871	Envoy				
Austria-Hungary (1867–1918)
Carl Edward Vilhelm Piper	25 October 1872 – 1877	Envoy	Also accredited to Munich			
Hans Henric von Essen	26 June 1877 – 16 November 1883	Envoy extraordinary and minister plenipotentiary				
Henrik Åkerman	1884–1890	Envoy				
Gustaf Adolf Sixten Axel August Lewenhaupt	22 November 1890 – 11 July 1895	Chargé d'affaires				
Gustaf Adolf Sixten Axel August Lewenhaupt	12 July 1895 – 15 October 1895	Acting envoy				
Gustaf Adolf Sixten Axel August Lewenhaupt	16 October July 1895 – 27 December 1904	Envoy extraordinary and minister plenipotentiary		Died in office (in Tamaris-sur-Mer, France)		
Gustaf Falkenberg	15 November 1904 – ?	Chargé d'affaires ad interim				
Joachim Beck-Friis	9 June 1905 – 1918	Envoy	Also accredited to Bucharest and Belgrade (Note: From 8 April and 6 May 1914 respectively.)	Also consul general. (Note: The position was combined with the role of Consul General there on 28 September 1906.)		
Republic of German-Austria (1918–1919)
Oskar Ewerlöf	1918–1919	Envoy				
First Austrian Republic (1919–1934)
Oskar Ewerlöf	1919–1923	Envoy	Also accredited to Budapest (from 1920)			
Ivan Danielsson	1923–1924	Envoy	Also accredited to Budapest			
Jonas Alströmer	24 September 1924 – 1925	Envoy	Resident in Bern			
Patrik Reuterswärd	28 June 1924 – 1928	Chargé d'affaires	Also accredited to Budapest			
Einar Hennings	1925–1928	Envoy	Resident in Bern		January 1926	
Federal State of Austria (1934–1938)
Torsten Undén	1928–1938	Envoy	Also accredited to Budapest and Belgrade			
Austria within Nazi Germany (1938–1945)
–	1938–1946	Envoy		No representation due to Anschluss and World War II		
Republic of Austria (1945–present)
Jens Malling	1946–1948	Chargé d'affaires ad interim (Note: Held the diplomatic rank of first legation secretary.)				
Gösta Hedengren	1948–1951	Chargé d'affaires (Note: Held the diplomatic rank of legation counsellor.)				
Kurt-Allan Belfrage	1951–1954	Envoy				
Sven Allard	1954 – August 1956	Envoy				
Sven Allard	August 1956 – 1964	Ambassador				
Karl-Gustav Lagerfelt	1964–1969	Ambassador				
Lennart Petri	1969–1976	Ambassador				
Claës Ivar Wollin	1976–1981	Ambassador				
Dag Malm	1981–1988	Ambassador				
Curt Lidgard	1988–1992	Ambassador				
Anita Gradin	1992–1994	Ambassador	Also accredited to Ljubljana and the United Nations Office at Vienna	Political appointee (non-career diplomat)		
Björn Skala	1995–2000	Ambassador	Also accredited to Ljubljana (until 1999)			
Gabriella Lindholm	2000–2005	Ambassador				
Hans Lundborg	2005–2011	Ambassador				
Nils Daag	2011–2015	Ambassador	Also accredited to Bratislava and Ljubljana			
Helen Eduards	2015–2018	Ambassador	Also accredited to Bratislava and Ljubljana (from 2016)			
Mikaela Kumlin Granit	September 2018 – 2021	Ambassador	Also accredited to Bratislava and Ljubljana			
Annika Markovic	2021–2025	Ambassador	Also accredited to Bratislava		16 September 2021	
Annika Ben David	2025–present	Ambassador				
