= Patrik Reuterswärd =

Swedish diplomat (1885–1963)

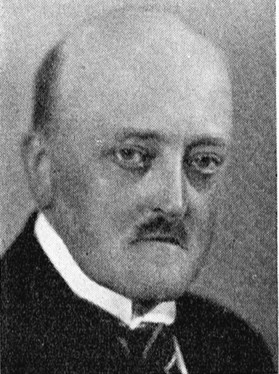
- Born: Carl Reinhold Patrik Reuterswärd; 27 February 1885; Lännäs, Sweden
- Died: 3 August 1963 (aged 78); Täby, Sweden
- Education: Uppsala University
- Occupation: Diplomat
- Years active: 1907–1950
- Spouse: Karin Herdin (m. 1913)
- Children: 6

Carl Reinhold Patrik Reuterswärd (27 February 1885 – 3 August 1963) was a Swedish diplomat. Reuterswärd began his diplomatic career in 1907, serving in various roles at the Swedish Ministry for Foreign Affairs. He was posted as an attaché in New York City and Paris before taking on assignments in Tokyo and Beijing, where he acted as chargé d'affaires ad interim in 1912. Over the years, he held key diplomatic positions in Shanghai, Washington, D.C., Copenhagen, Berlin, and London, often serving as chargé d'affaires ad interim. In 1928, he was appointed envoy extraordinary and minister plenipotentiary to the Baltic states and later to Bucharest and Sofia. During World War II, he remained in Romania, safeguarding the interests of multiple nations despite limited communication with Sweden. After the war, he continued his diplomatic service until his retirement in 1950.

== Early life ==
Reuterswärd was born into the noble family Reuterswärd on 25 February 1885, at Äspenäs in Lännäs Parish, Örebro Municipality. He was the son of Carl Reuterswärd (1853–1932) and his wife, Baroness Rosa Elisabet Fransiska von Ungern-Sternberg (1856–1938). His father was a lieutenant colonel in the Life Regiment Hussar Corps, while his mother, a member of the Ungern-Sternberg noble family and born in Heidelberg, Germany, became a lady-in-waiting to Queen Victoria of Baden in 1908. His grandfather was the politician, court marshal, and member of parliament Patric Reuterswärd.

After passing his matriculation examination in Örebro in 1902, he became a underlöjtnant in the reserve of the Second Svea Artillery Regiment on 8 December 1904. He earned a Juris Utriusque Kandidat (jur. utr. kand.) degree from Uppsala University on 30 May 1907.

== Career ==
Reuterswärd began his diplomatic career as an attaché on 7 August 1907 and was assigned to the Ministry for Foreign Affairs on 30 September 1907. He served as an attaché in New York City from 3 February 1908 and in Paris from 13 February 1909. He resigned from his commission as a reserve underlöjtnant on 8 April 1910. On 27 January 1911, he was appointed acting second secretary and later became acting legation secretary in Tokyo and Beijing on 30 December 1911. From 18 February to 14 June 1912, he served as chargé d'affaires ad interim in Tokyo. Returning to Sweden, he was appointed second secretary at the Ministry for Foreign Affairs on 31 December 1912, and later served as chargé d'affaires ad interim from 11 October 1913 to 5 February 1914. He was promoted to first secretary at the ministry on 18 December 1913.

From 14 February to 23 November 1914, he served as acting consul general and consular judge in Shanghai. In 1917, he worked as an assistant secretary at the Nordic ministerial meeting in Stockholm and undertook a special assignment in Washington, D.C. On 31 December 1917, he was appointed extraordinary first secretary, and on 26 March 1918, he became acting head of a department at the Ministry for Foreign Affairs. His international postings continued with his appointment as first legation secretary in Copenhagen on 22 July 1918, where he also served as chargé d'affaires ad interim at various times in 1918 and 1919. On 12 September 1919, he was posted as first legation secretary in Berlin, once again serving as chargé d'affaires ad interim at different times in 1920 and 1921. In 1921, he represented Sweden at the Oder Commission meeting in Breslau. Later that year, on 23 September 1921, he was posted as first legation secretary in London and was promoted to legation counselor on 16 December 1921. Between 1922 and 1924, he served as chargé d'affaires ad interim at various times.

On 28 June 1924, he was appointed legation counselor in Bern, Vienna, and Budapest, while also serving as chargé d'affaires in Vienna and Budapest. His career continued to rise, and on 13 June 1928, he was appointed envoy extraordinary and minister plenipotentiary in Reval (Tallinn), Riga, and Kovno (Kaunas). On 26 April 1935, he became envoy to Bucharest and Sofia. During World War II, he spent more than two years in this role, almost entirely cut off from communication with Sweden. Despite changing political regimes, he was responsible for safeguarding the interests of approximately ten different nations.

In 1949, he was placed on availability, and in 1950, he retired with a pension. In November 1949, he was elected to the board of the Reuterswärd Family Association (Reuterswärdska släktföreningen).

== Personal life ==
On 6 September 1913, Reuterswärd married Karin Herdin (1889–1981) at Uppsala Cathedral. She was the daughter of magistrate and court secretary Karl Wilhelm Herdin, who also served as vice district judge (vice häradshövding), and Augusta Carolina Bexelius. They had six sons: Carl Wilhelm Patrik (1914–1989), Reinhold Patrik Oskar (1916–1984); Erik August Patrik (1917–2002), Göran Edgar Patrik (1919–1994), Gösta Fredrik Patrik (1922–1989), and Patrik Anders Adolf (1922–2000).

== Death ==
Reuterswärd died on 3 August 1963 in Näsbypark, Täby Municipality. He was laid to rest on 13 October 1963 at Täby Cemetery.

== Awards and decorations ==
=== Swedish ===
- (Sweden) King Gustaf V's Jubilee Commemorative Medal (16 June 1928)
- (Sweden) Commander Grand Cross of the Order of the Polar Star (6 June 1938)
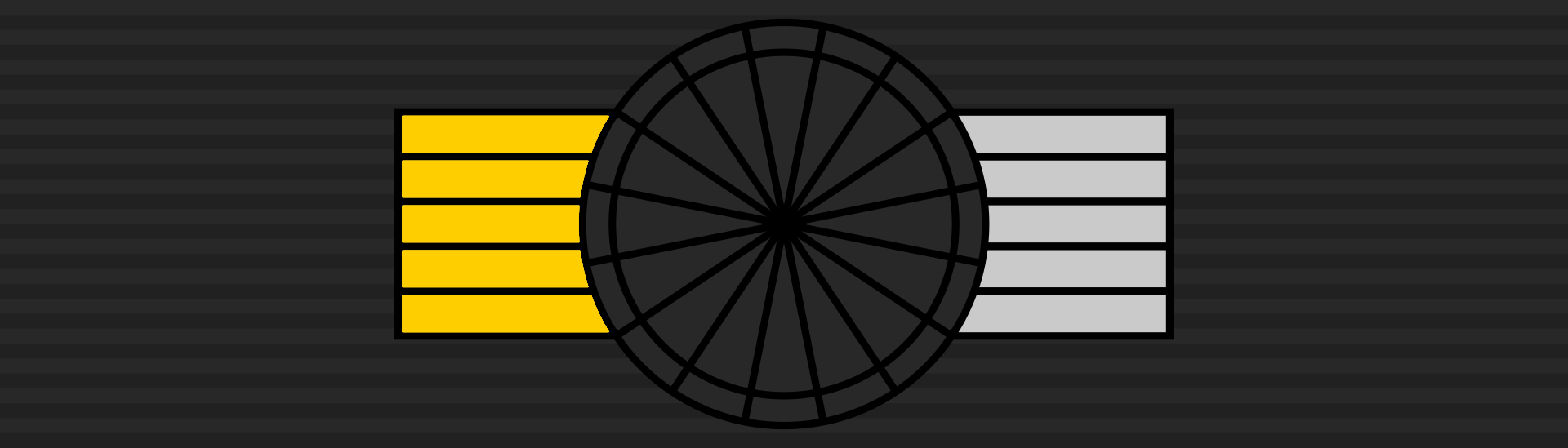
- (Sweden) Commander 1st Class of the Order of the Polar Star (28 November 1930)
- (Sweden) Knight of the Order of the Polar Star (28 October 1920)

=== Foreign ===
- (Estonia) Grand Cross of the Order of the Cross of the Eagle
- Grand Cross of the Order of the Lion of Finland
- (Latvia) Grand Cross of the Order of the Three Stars (1929)
- (Lithuania) Grand Cross of the Order of the Lithuanian Grand Duke Gediminas
- (Netherlands) Grand Cross of the Order of Orange-Nassau
- (Norway) Grand Cross of the Order of St. Olav (1948)
- (Kingdom of Romania) Grand Cross of the Order of the Crown of Romania
- Grand Cross of the Order of Merit of the Republic of Hungary
- (Kingdom of Hungary) 2nd Class of the Cross of Merit of Hungary with star (1928)
- Commander 1st Class of the Decoration of Honour for Services to the Republic of Austria (1928)
- (United Kingdom) Commander 2nd Class of the Royal Victorian Order (1923)
- (Denmark) Knight of the Order of the Dannebrog (14 May 1917)
- (Empire of Japan) 4th Class of the Order of the Rising Sun (1919)
- (Empire of Japan) 4th Class of the Order of the Sacred Treasure (1913)
- (Kingdom of Prussia) 2nd and 3rd Class of the Red Cross Medal (1921)

Diplomatic posts
Preceded by Torsten Undén	Envoy of Sweden to Latvia; 1928–1935	Succeeded by Birger Johansson
Preceded by Torsten Undén	Envoy of Sweden to Estonia; 1928–1935	Succeeded by Birger Johansson
Preceded by Torsten Undén	Envoy of Sweden to Lithuania; 1928–1935	Succeeded by Birger Johansson
Preceded by Erik Boheman	Envoy of Sweden to Romania; 1935–1948	Succeeded by Sven Allard
Preceded by Wilhelm Winther	Envoy of Sweden to Bulgaria; 1935–1948	Succeeded by Sven Allard
