= Kosovo–Sweden relations =

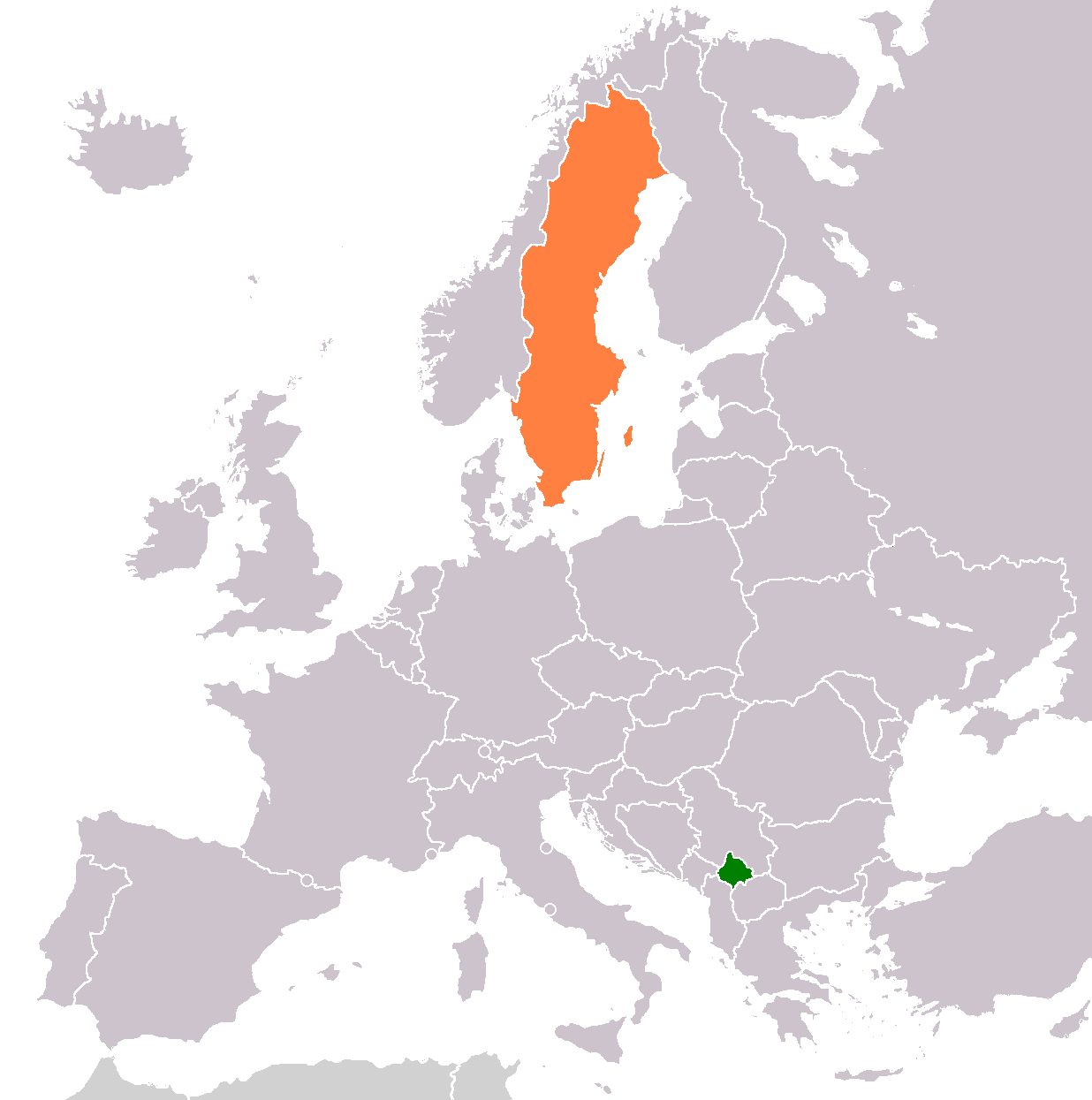
- Kosovo: Sweden

Diplomatic mission
- Embassy of Kosovo, Stockholm: Embassy of Sweden, Pristina

Envoy
- Ambassador Shkendije Geci-Sherifi: Ambassador Karin Hernmarck Ahliny

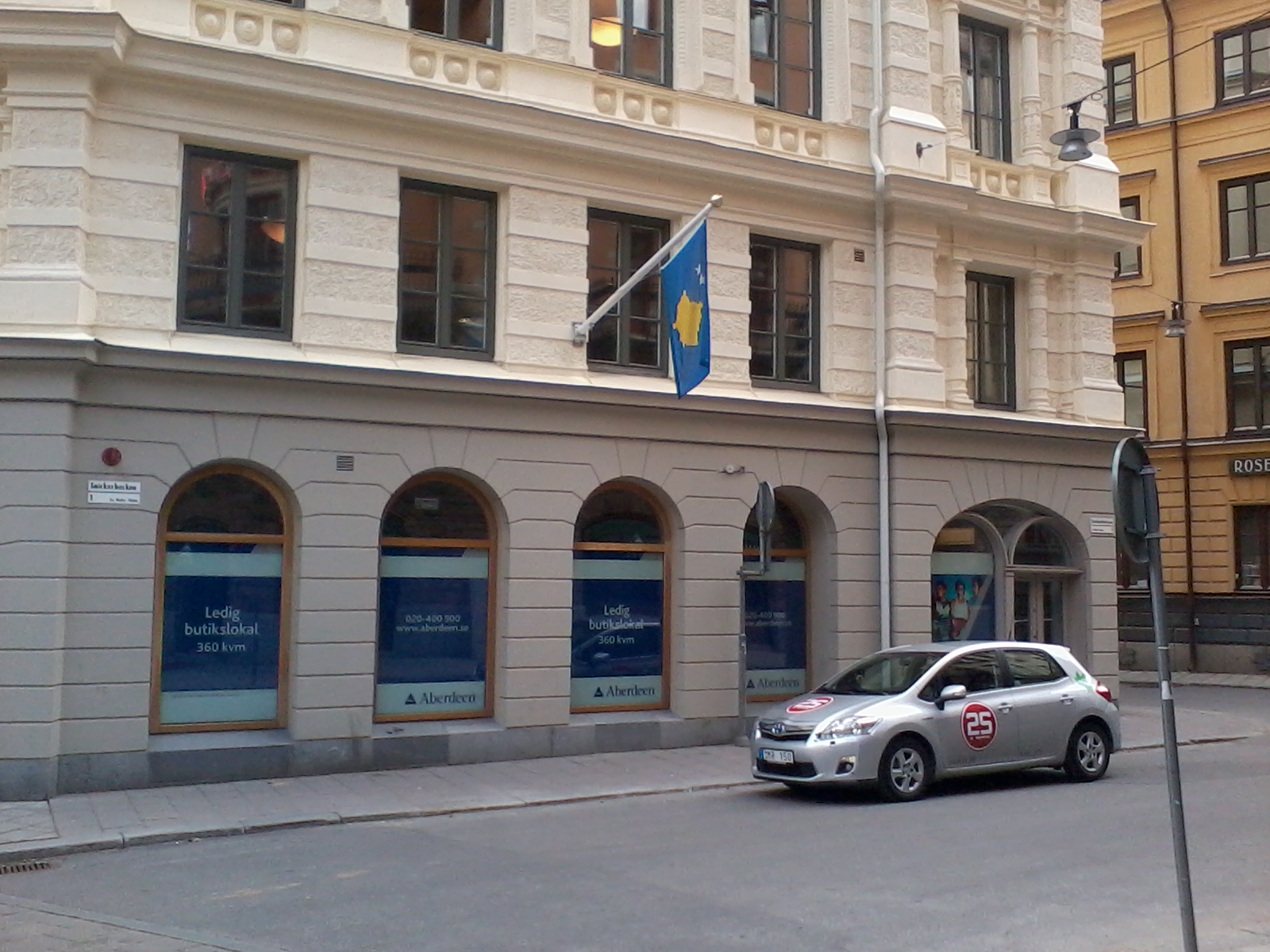
Kosovan embassy in Stockholm, Sweden.

Kosovo–Sweden relations are foreign relations between the Republic of Kosovo and the Kingdom of Sweden. Kosovo declared its independence from Serbia on 17 February 2008 and Sweden recognised it on 4 March 2008. Kosovo opened an embassy in Stockholm on 15 December 2009. The Swedish Liaison Office in Pristina, which was later upgraded to embassy status, represents Sweden's interests in the Republic of Kosovo. On 8 March 2008, the Swedish Minister for Foreign Affairs Carl Bildt became the first foreign minister to officially visit Kosovo since it declared its independence. The two countries enjoy very good and friendly relations.

Kosovo’s bilateral relationship with Sweden is new and evolving, with the Kosovo Albanian diaspora in Sweden acting as a bridge between the two countries. Sweden has a record of condemning Serbia for its actions in former Yugoslavia and supported NATO’s campaign to stop the ethnic cleansing in Kosovo. After the war, Sweden became one of the biggest humanitarian aid donors in Kosovo, supporting various projects within state institutions and civil society.

== Military ==
Sweden currently has 243 troops serving in Kosovo as peacekeepers in the NATO led Kosovo Force.

== See also ==
- Foreign relations of Kosovo
- Foreign relations of Sweden
- Serbia–Sweden relations
- Sweden–Yugoslavia relations
