= List of ambassadors of Sweden to Yugoslavia =

Ambassador of Sweden to Yugoslavia
- Lesser coat of arms of the Kingdom of Sweden
- Ministry for Foreign Affairs; Swedish Embassy, Belgrade
- Style: His or Her Excellency (formal); Mr. or Madam Ambassador (informal)
- Reports to: Minister for Foreign Affairs
- Residence: Užička 45, Dedinje (Note: The residence has been located at Užička 45 since 1969. The street and address were previously known as Rumunska No. 53)
- Seat: Belgrade, Yugoslavia
- Appointer: Government of Sweden
- Term length: No fixed term
- Formation: 1 January 1922
- First holder: Einar af Wirsén
- Final holder: Jan af Sillén
- Abolished: 1992
- Superseded by: Ambassador of Sweden to Serbia
- Website: Swedish Embassy, Belgrade

The Ambassador of Sweden to Yugoslavia (known formally as the Ambassador of the Kingdom of Sweden to Yugoslavia) was the official representative of the government of Sweden to the president of Yugoslavia and government of Yugoslavia. The post ceased in 1992 in connection with the dissolution of Yugoslavia.

== History ==
In a report on the reorganization of the Ministry for Foreign Affairs in early January 1921, it was proposed that the head of mission in Constantinople also be accredited in Belgrade, Sofia, Athens, Tiflis, Baku, and eventually in Armenia. However, the experts recommended that the minister, for the time being, be accredited only in Sofia. In October of the same year, Einar af Wirsén was appointed as Sweden's first envoy to Yugoslavia, with residency in Bucharest, Romania, to serve as envoy starting 1 January 1922.

On 29 April 1938, changes in Swedish foreign representation were announced. Envoy Torsten Undén, who had previously served as Swedish envoy in Vienna with accreditation in Belgrade, was to relocate his residence and chancery to Budapest.

In 1939, Folke Malmar was appointed as Sweden's first resident envoy in Belgrade. On 15 June, he was received in an audience by Prince Paul of Yugoslavia, to whom he presented his credentials.

On 27 March 1941, the same day as the Yugoslav coup d'état, Envoy Malmar was assaulted by demonstrators in Belgrade after being pulled from his car at a street barricade. The Yugoslav government later expressed deep regret over the incident. His injuries were evidently more serious than he initially realized. He was recalled later in 1941 and, upon returning home, required extended hospitalization and was subsequently retired. For the remainder of the war, Sweden did not have a minister stationed in Belgrade.

In September 1956, an agreement was reached between the Swedish and Yugoslavian governments on the mutual elevation of the respective countries' legations to embassies. The diplomatic rank was thereafter changed to ambassador instead of envoy extraordinary and minister plenipotentiary.

In June 1969, Sweden and Albania established diplomatic relations. That same month, Sweden's ambassador in Belgrade, Lennart Finnmark, was appointed ambassador to Tirana, Albania, as well.

The ambassador served in Belgrade until the spring of 1992, when Yugoslavia dissolved.

== List of representatives ==
Name	Period	Title	Resident / Concurrent accreditation	Notes	Presented credentials	Ref
Kingdom of Yugoslavia (1918–1941)
Einar af Wirsén	1 January 1922 – 1924 (Note: Elgenstierna (1934), p. 825, states the date as 26 September 1921, and notes that he was on leave from 5 November 1924. On 25 October 1921, Svenska Dagbladet reported that the King in Council had appointed af Wirsén to establish, starting 1 January 1922, the position of envoy extraordinary and minister plenipotentiary to serve as ambassador in Bucharest, Athens, and Belgrade.)	Envoy	Resident in Bucharest			
Jonas Alströmer	1925–1928	Acting envoy	Resident in Bucharest			
Torsten Undén	1928–1938	Envoy	Resident in Vienna			
Torsten Undén	1938–1939	Envoy	Resident in Budapest			
Knut Richard Thyberg	1938–1939	Chargé d'affaires ad interim				
Folke Malmar	2 June 1939 – 31 July 1941	Envoy			15 June 1939	
–	1941–1945	–		No representation after the invasion of Yugoslavia	–	
Federal People's Republic of Yugoslavia (1945–1963)
Gunnar Reuterskiöld	1945–1948	Envoy				
Birger Johansson	1948–1953	Envoy				
Ole Jödahl	1953–1956	Envoy				
Stig Unger	1954–1956	Chargé d'affaires ad interim				
Stig Unger	1 April 1956 – September 1956	Envoy				
Stig Unger	September 1956 – 1961	Ambassador				
Sven Backlund	1961–1963	Ambassador				
Socialist Federal Republic of Yugoslavia (1963–1992)
Agda Rössel	1964–1969	Ambassador				
Lennart Finnmark	1969–1975	Ambassador	Also accredited to Tirana			
Axel Lewenhaupt	1975–1978	Ambassador	Also accredited to Tirana			
Bertil Arvidson	1978–1982	Ambassador	Also accredited to Tirana			
Lennart Myrsten	1982–1987	Ambassador	Also accredited to Tirana			
Jan af Sillén	1987–1992	Ambassador	Also accredited to Tirana			

== See also ==
- Sweden–Yugoslavia relations
- List of ambassadors of Sweden to Serbia
