= List of ambassadors of Sweden to Serbia =

Ambassador of Sweden to Serbia
- Lesser coat of arms of the Kingdom of Sweden
- Incumbent; Charlotte Sammelin since 15 August 2024
- Ministry for Foreign Affairs; Swedish Embassy, Belgrade
- Style: His or Her Excellency (formal); Mr. or Madam Ambassador (informal)
- Reports to: Minister for Foreign Affairs
- Residence: Užička 45, Dedinje (Note: The street and address were previously known as Rumunska No. 53)
- Seat: Belgrade, Serbia
- Appointer: Government of Sweden
- Term length: No fixed term
- Precursor: Ambassador of Sweden to Yugoslavia
- Inaugural holder: Mats Staffansson (Note: Mats Staffansson was the first Swedish ambassador to the then Serbia and Montenegro from 3 July 1996. However, Baron Joachim Beck-Friis had been accredited to the Serbian court in the Kingdom of Serbia from 6 May 1914.)
- Formation: 3 July 1996
- Website: Swedish Embassy, Belgrade

The Ambassador of Sweden to Serbia (known formally as the Ambassador of the Kingdom of Sweden to the Republic of Serbia) is the official representative of the government of Sweden to the president of Serbia and government of Serbia. Sweden's ambassador is also accredited to Montenegro.

== History ==
Sweden had an envoy stationed in Belgrade, in what was then Yugoslavia, from 1 January 1922. The envoy, later elevated to ambassador, served in Belgrade until the spring of 1992, when Yugoslavia dissolved.

The position of ambassador remained vacant from 1992 to 1996 following the outbreak of the Yugoslav Wars. On 11 April 1996, Sweden recognized the Federal Republic of Yugoslavia as one of the successor states to the Socialist Federal Republic of Yugoslavia. On 24 April of the same year, Mats Staffansson was appointed as the new Swedish ambassador to Belgrade, assuming the position on 3 July. In September of the same year, he was also accredited as ambassador to Skopje, Macedonia. The Swedish ambassador remained accredited to Skopje until 2005, when Sweden opened an embassy there.

Sweden recognized the independence of Montenegro on 14 June 2006 and diplomatic relations were established on 26 June 2006. Sweden's ambassador to Belgrade has been concurrently accredited to Podgorica since 2006.

== List of representatives ==
Name	Period	Title	Notes	Presented credentials	Ref
Kingdom of Serbia (1882–1918)
Joachim Beck-Friis	6 May 1914 – 1918	Envoy	Resident in Vienna.		
For Swedish ambassadors between 1918 and 1992, please see Swedish Ambassador to Yugoslavia
Federal Republic of Yugoslavia (1992–2003) and State Union of Serbia and Montenegro (2003–2006)
Lars-Gunnar Wigemark	1992–1993	Chargé d'affaires			
Göran Jacobsson	1993–1996	Chargé d'affaires (Note: Held the diplomatic rank of minister.)			
Mats Staffansson	3 July 1996 – 2000	Ambassador	Also accredited to Skopje.		
Michael Sahlin	2000–2002	Ambassador	Also accredited to Skopje.		
Lars-Göran Engfeldt	2002–2006	Ambassador	Also accredited to Skopje (until 2005) and Podgorica (from 2006).		
Republic of Serbia (2006–present)
Krister Bringéus	2007–2010	Ambassador	Also accredited to Podgorica.		
Christer Asp	2010–2016	Ambassador	Also accredited to Podgorica.		
Jan Lundin	15 June 2016 – 2021	Ambassador	Also accredited to Podgorica.		
Annika Ben David	2021–2024	Ambassador	Also accredited to Podgorica.		
Charlotte Sammelin	15 August 2024 – present	Ambassador	Also accredited to Podgorica.		

== See also ==
- Serbia–Sweden relations
- List of ambassadors of Sweden to Yugoslavia
