= Rolf Ekéus =

Swedish diplomat (born 1935)

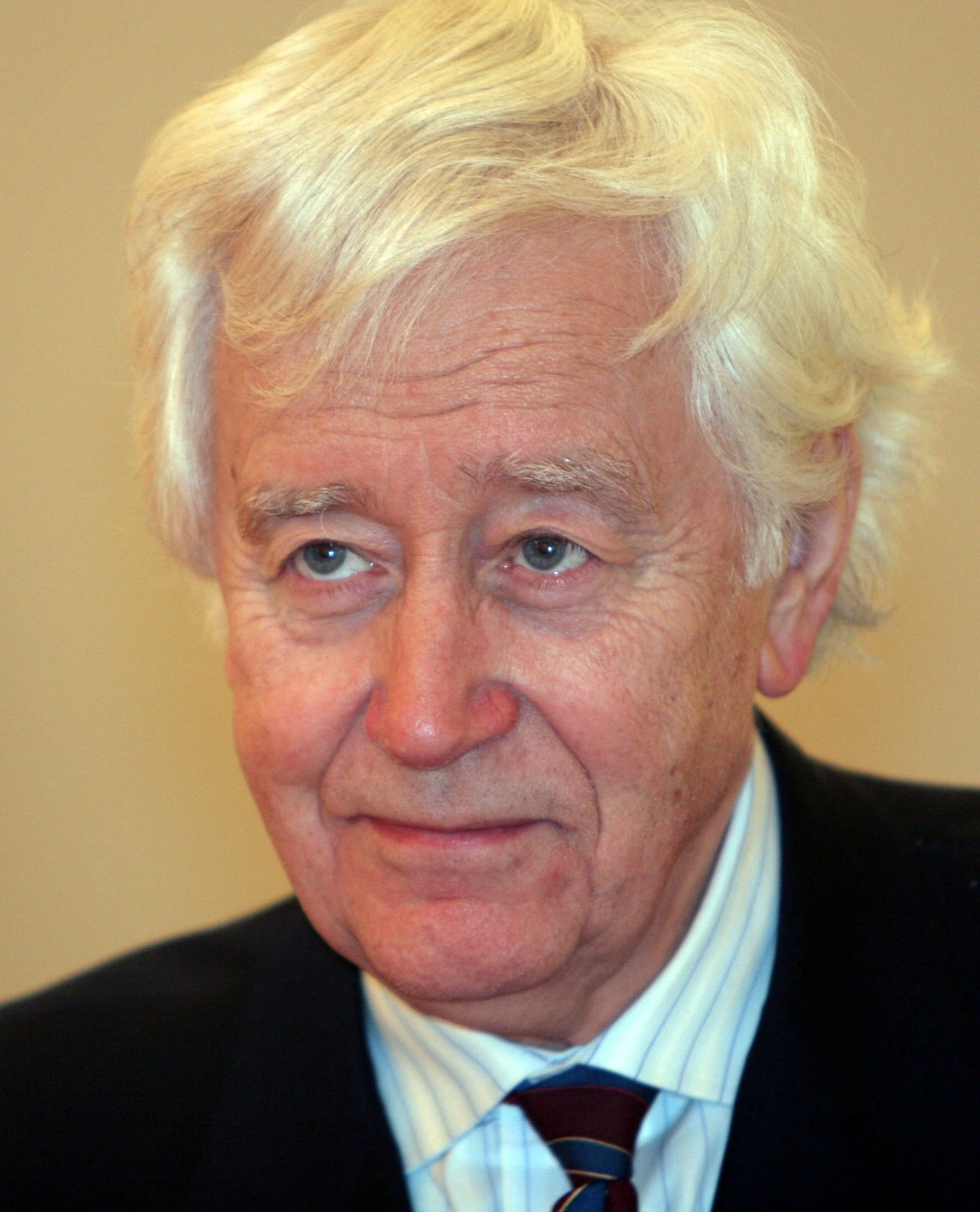
- Ekéus in 2006
- Born: Carl Rolf Ekéus; 7 July 1935 (age 91); Kristinehamn, Sweden
- Education: Stockholm University College
- Occupation: Diplomat
- Years active: 1959–2015
- Spouse: Christina Oldfelt (m. 1970)
- Children: 6

Carl Rolf Ekéus (born 7 July 1935) is a Swedish diplomat. Ekéus had a long career in diplomacy and international security. He began as a district court clerk before joining the Swedish Ministry for Foreign Affairs in 1962, with postings in Bonn, Nairobi, and The Hague. He played a key role in Sweden's UN delegation, serving as deputy representative on the Security Council and later as ambassador to the Disarmament Delegation in Geneva. From 1991 to 1997, he led the United Nations Special Commission on Iraq, overseeing disarmament efforts after the Gulf War.

Ekéus later served as Sweden's ambassador to the United States (1997–2000) and held influential positions in arms control, including membership in the Canberra Commission and the UN Advisory Board on Disarmament Matters. From 2001 to 2007, he served as OSCE High Commissioner on National Minorities. He has since remained active in international security, including roles with SIPRI, the Nuclear Threat Initiative, and the International Commission on Missing Persons.

== Early life ==
Ekéus was born on 7 July 1935 in Kristinehamn, Sweden, the son of Axel Eriksson, a teaching assistant, and his wife Margit (née Johansson). He earned a Candidate of Law degree from Stockholm University College in 1959.

== Career ==
Ekéus served as a district court clerk from 1959 to 1962 before joining the Ministry for Foreign Affairs as an attaché in 1962. He was posted in Bonn from 1963 to 1965 and then served as embassy secretary in Nairobi from 1965 to 1967. In 1967, he became an administrative officer (kanslisekreterare) at the Ministry for Foreign Affairs and was appointed desk officer (departementssekreterare) in 1970. From 1970 to 1974, he worked as secretary to the minister for foreign affairs.

Ekéus then served as first secretary at Sweden's UN delegation in New York City from 1974 to 1978 and was deputy representative for Sweden on the United Nations Security Council from 1975 to 1976. In 1978, he was appointed counselor at the Swedish Embassy in The Hague. He later became Sweden's ambassador to the Disarmament Delegation in Geneva in 1983 and Permanent Representative of Sweden to Military Negotiations in Vienna from 1989 to 1994.

Between 1991 and 1997 he was director of the United Nations Special Commission on Iraq, the United Nations disarmament observers in Iraq after the Gulf War. In late July 2002 he reportedly said in the Svenska Dagbladet newspaper that during his time in this position he attempted to resist attempts by the United States to use the commission to perform espionage. His successor as director was Richard Butler. The journalist Andrew Cockburn reported in The First Post that Ekéus told him how the former US President Bill Clinton attempted to prevent Saddam Hussein's Iraq from being certified as free of weapons of mass destruction. Despite Ekéus' belief that Iraq was nearly certifiable as being free of such weapons, US Secretary of State Madeleine Albright announced that United Nations sanctions would not be lifted until such time as Hussein was no longer in power.

According to the journalist Christopher Hitchens, Ekéus "told me that he'd been offered by Tariq Aziz in person, to his face, a bribe of a million and a half dollars to change his inspection report. That was going on throughout the entire process. Rolf wouldn't, of course, agree to take it, but if they were asking him, it means they were asking everybody." The story has also been covered by The Telegraph.

Ekéus was a member of the Canberra Commission on the Elimination of Nuclear Weapons in 1996. He served as Sweden's ambassador to the United States from 1997 to 2000. In 1999, he became a member of the UN Advisory Board on Disarmament Matters, and in 2000, he joined the board of the Stockholm International Peace Research Institute (SIPRI).

In January 2000, Ekéus was nominated to head the United Nations Monitoring, Verification and Inspection Commission (UNMOVIC), charged with investigating allegations that Iraq possessed weapons of mass destruction. But Ekéus' name failed to receive the approval of the United Nations Security Council, due to the opposition of France, Russia and China, and so Hans Blix was appointed instead.

Ekéus was High Commissioner on National Minorities at the OSCE from 2001 till 2007, as well as on the board of directors for the Nuclear Threat Initiative (NTI). Since 2005, Ekéus has been a Commissioner of the International Commission on Missing Persons (ICMP). He is also Member of the Supervisory Council of the International Luxembourg Forum on Preventing Nuclear Catastrophe, a not-for-profit organisation uniting leading experts on non-proliferation of nuclear weapons, materials and delivery vehicles.

== Personal life ==
In 1979, Ekéus married Christina Kerstin Oldfelt (born 1938), the daughter of Professor Carl Olof Oldfelt and Vera (née Svenonius). They have three daughters and three sons.

== Awards ==
- (Sweden) H. M. The King's Medal, 12th size gold (silver-gilt) medal worn around the neck on the Order of the Seraphim ribbon (2019) for "outstanding contributions to international disarmament work and Swedish foreign affairs"

== Honours ==
- Honorary Doctor of Laws, California Lutheran University (1999)
- Member of the Royal Swedish Academy of War Sciences (2000)

== Bibliography ==
- Ekéus, Rolf (2018). Mellan två krig: Saddams fall och IS födelse [Between Two Wars: The Fall of Saddam and the Birth of ISIS] (in Swedish). Stockholm: Albert Bonniers förlag. ISBN 9789100158897. SELIBR 21765856.

Political offices
Preceded by None	Director of the United Nations Special Commission; 1991–1997	Succeeded by Richard Butler
Diplomatic posts
Preceded by Curt Lidgard	Permanent Delegate of Sweden at the Military Negotiations within the CSCE; 1989–1994	Succeeded by Björn Elmér
Preceded by Henrik Liljegren	Ambassador of Sweden to the United States; 1997–2000	Succeeded by Jan Eliasson
