= Dennis Bozic =

Swedish ice hockey player

- Born: 2 August 1990 (age 36) Södertälje, Sweden
- Height: 5 ft 10 in (178 cm)
- Weight: 196 lb (89 kg; 14 st 0 lb)
- Position: Defence
- Shot: Right
- Played for: Linköping HC; Nybro Vikings IF; Malmö Redhawks; IK Oskarshamn; VIK Västerås HK; HC Vita Hästen; IF Sundsvall Hockey; Modo Hockey; KHL Medveščak Zagreb; Beibarys Atyrau; Herlev Eagles
- Playing career: 2008–2015

Dennis Bozic (born 2 August 1990 in Södertälje) is a Swedish ice hockey player of Croatian ancestry. He is currently playing with the KHL Medveščak in the Austrian Hockey League.

== Career statistics ==
			Regular season					Playoffs
Season	Team	League	GP	G	A	Pts	PIM	GP	G	A	Pts	PIM
2005–06	Södertälje SK U16	U16 SM	3	0	1	1	2	—	—	—	—	—
2006–07	Södertälje SK J18	J18 Allsvenskan	13	1	1	2	10	—	—	—	—	—
2006–07	Södertälje SK J20	J20 SuperElit	4	1	0	1	2	—	—	—	—	—
2007–08	Linköping HC J18	J18 Elit	4	1	1	2	31	—	—	—	—	—
2007–08	Linköping HC J20	J20 SuperElit	38	4	8	12	65	5	0	0	0	4
2007–08	Linköping HC	Elitserien	2	0	0	0	0	—	—	—	—	—
2008–09	Linköping HC J20	J20 SuperElit	22	1	12	13	26	5	1	4	5	2
2008–09	Linköping HC	Elitserien	21	0	1	1	2	—	—	—	—	—
2008–09	Nybro Vikings IF	HockeyAllsvenskan	2	0	0	0	0	—	—	—	—	—
2008–09	Malmö Redhawks	HockeyAllsvenskan	3	0	0	0	0	—	—	—	—	—
2009–10	Linköping HC J20	J20 SuperElit	1	0	0	0	2	5	0	2	2	4
2009–10	Linköping HC	Elitserien	5	0	0	0	2	8	0	0	0	0
2009–10	IK Oskarshamn	HockeyAllsvenskan	42	2	8	10	43	—	—	—	—	—
2010–11	Linköping HC J20	J20 SuperElit	5	1	1	2	6	—	—	—	—	—
2010–11	Linköping HC	Elitserien	6	0	0	0	0	—	—	—	—	—
2010–11	VIK Västerås HK	HockeyAllsvenskan	9	0	1	1	4	—	—	—	—	—
2010–11	HC Vita Hästen	Division 1	1	0	0	0	0	—	—	—	—	—
2010–11	IF Sundsvall Hockey	HockeyAllsvenskan	18	4	0	4	6	—	—	—	—	—
2011–12	IF Sundsvall Hockey	HockeyAllsvenskan	43	3	4	7	18	4	0	0	0	0
2011–12	MODO Hockey	Elitserien	2	0	0	0	0	—	—	—	—	—
2012–13	Medvescak Zagreb	EBEL	53	1	7	8	23	6	0	1	1	2
2012–13	Medvescak Zagreb II	Croatia	—	—	—	—	—	1	0	0	0	2
2013–14	Beibarys Atyrau	Kazakhstan	2	0	1	1	0	—	—	—	—	—
2014–15	Herlev Eagles	Denmark	27	3	14	17	16	—	—	—	—	—
Elitserien totals			36	0	1	1	4	8	0	0	0	0
HockeyAllsvenskan totals			117	9	13	22	71	4	0	0	0	0
