= Joachim Beck-Friis (1861–1939) =

Swedish diplomat (1861–1939)

Baron Joachim Beck-Friis
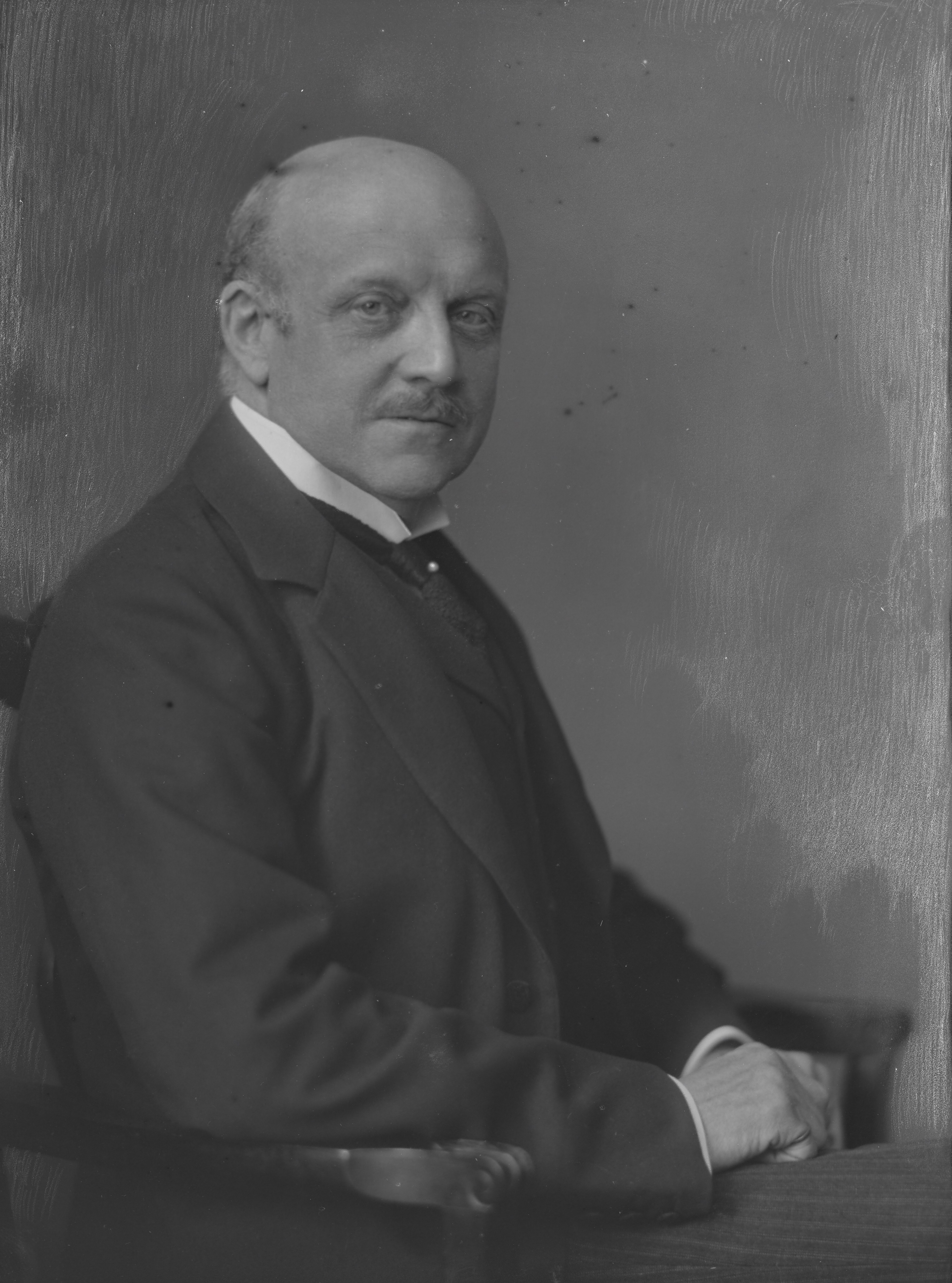
- Beck-Friis in 1918
- Born: Hans Joachim Beck-Friis; 27 September 1861; Börringe Priory, Sweden
- Died: 6 May 1939 (aged 77); Julita, Sweden
- Education: Lund University
- Occupation: Diplomat
- Years active: 1884–1928

Baron Hans Joachim Beck-Friis (27 September 1861 – 6 May 1939) was a Swedish diplomat from the noble Beck-Friis family. He studied law at Lund University, graduating in 1884, and entered the Swedish foreign service the same year. He served in a series of diplomatic posts in major capitals, including Paris, Berlin, Vienna, Washington, D.C., and Saint Petersburg. He later held senior positions at Sweden's Ministry for Foreign Affairs, including head of the Political Department and acting state secretary for Foreign affairs.

From 1903, he served as envoy extraordinary and minister plenipotentiary in Constantinople, and from 1905 in Vienna, where he also served as consul-general. He undertook special diplomatic assignments in Belgrade and Bucharest. During World War I, he was involved in establishing formal diplomatic relations between Sweden and Romania in 1916. He later served as Swedish envoy in Copenhagen from 1918 to 1928, where he worked to strengthen bilateral relations.

== Early life and education ==
Joachim Beck-Friis was born into the noble Beck-Friis family on 27 September 1861 at Börringe Priory in Börringe Parish, Skåne County. He was the son of Count Corfitz Beck-Friis (1824–1897) and his wife Kristina Nordenfeldt (1829–1914).

His grandfather was Count and court official Corfitz Beck-Friis (1801–1870), while his great-grandfather was the military officer, count, and court official Corfitz Ludvig Beck-Friis (1767–1834). His great-great-grandfather was the military officer and baron Corfitz Ludvig Beck-Friis (1724–1798), and his great-great-great-grandfather was the military officer Corfitz Ludvig Beck-Friis (1685–1761), who took part in the Battle of Poltava.

His uncles included the diplomat Lave Beck-Friis (1834–1904) and the Lord Chamberlain and member of parliament Joachim Tawast Beck-Friis (1827–1888). On his mother's side, his grandfather was the chamberlain Olof Nordenfeldt (1790–1843), and his great-uncle was the chamberlain, industrialist, and politician Olof Nordenfeldt (1826–1893).

Joachim Beck-Friis had 13 siblings, including the member of parliament Corfitz Beck-Friis (1853–1911), the cabinet chamberlain Sigvard Beck-Friis (1855–1937), the district court judge Lave Beck-Friis (1857–1931), the artist Stina Beck-Friis (1865–1954), and the diplomat Augustin Beck-Friis (1869–1927).

He passed his matriculation examination in Lund on 30 May 1879, completed his preliminary examination on 29 May 1880, and earned his law degree on 28 May 1884 at Lund University.

== Career ==
Joachim Beck-Friis began his career as a trainee clerk at the Scania and Blekinge Court of Appeal on 10 June 1884. He entered the diplomatic service later that year, serving as an attaché from 30 September 1884, first in Paris from 22 May 1885, then in Berlin from 7 December 1885, and in Vienna from 21 January 1886. He was appointed acting second secretary to the Cabinet on 18 June 1886 and became second secretary on 29 October the same year.

On 13 November 1889, he was appointed acting legation secretary in Washington, D.C., receiving the permanent post on 18 April 1890. He later served in Saint Petersburg from 22 October 1892 and again in Berlin from 16 June 1894. On 7 November 1894, he became acting head of the Political Department of the Swedish Ministry for Foreign Affairs, and on 16 October 1896 he was appointed counsellor and head of department there. Between 16 December 1896 and 16 September 1900, he served as chargé d'affaires ad interim in Brussels and The Hague. During 1898 and 1899, he also served as acting state secretary for Foreign affairs.

On 29 June 1900, Beck-Friis became legation counsellor at the Swedish legation in Paris. He was appointed envoy extraordinary and minister plenipotentiary in Constantinople on 22 May 1903 and in Vienna on 9 June 1905, a post that from 28 September 1906 also included the office of consul-general. He later undertook special diplomatic missions in Belgrade in 1907 and Bucharest in 1912. On 17 August 1915, he was appointed envoy extraordinary and minister plenipotentiary in Bucharest.

On 8 April 1914, Beck-Friis was also appointed envoy to the Romanian court in Bucharest, and on 6 May 1914 he was additionally named minister to the Serbian court. However, the outbreak of World War I prevented him from presenting his credentials at the time. In March 1916, he traveled to Bucharest to formally present his credentials to Ferdinand I of Romania. Beck-Friis and the military attaché, Major af Ström, were received by Romanian Foreign Minister Emanoil Porumbaru, and on 18 March he was granted a formal audience with the king. From that date, Sweden and Romania officially established diplomatic relations.

A few months before the dissolution of Austria-Hungary in 1918, Beck-Friis left Vienna to succeed Ernst Günther as envoy extraordinary and minister plenipotentiary in Copenhagen, serving there from 11 June 1918 until 1928. In Denmark, memories were still strong of the long service of his uncle, Baron Lave Beck-Friis, who had represented Sweden–Norway at the Danish court for nearly 32 years. During his own decade as Swedish envoy in Copenhagen, Beck-Friis likewise made a lasting contribution to relations between the two countries.

== Personal life ==
Beck-Friis remained unmarried.

He owned a one-quarter share of the Kulleberga estate in Bosjökloster socken, which he inherited in 1914 together with three of his siblings following the death of his mother.

== Death ==
Beck-Friis died on 6 May 1939 while on a temporary visit to Gimmersta Manor in Julita Parish, Södermanland County, Sweden. His funeral service was held on 15 May 1939 at Börringe Church in Börringe, Svedala Municipality.

== Awards and decorations ==
=== Swedish ===
- (Sweden) Commander Grand Cross of the Order of the Polar Star (6 June 1913)
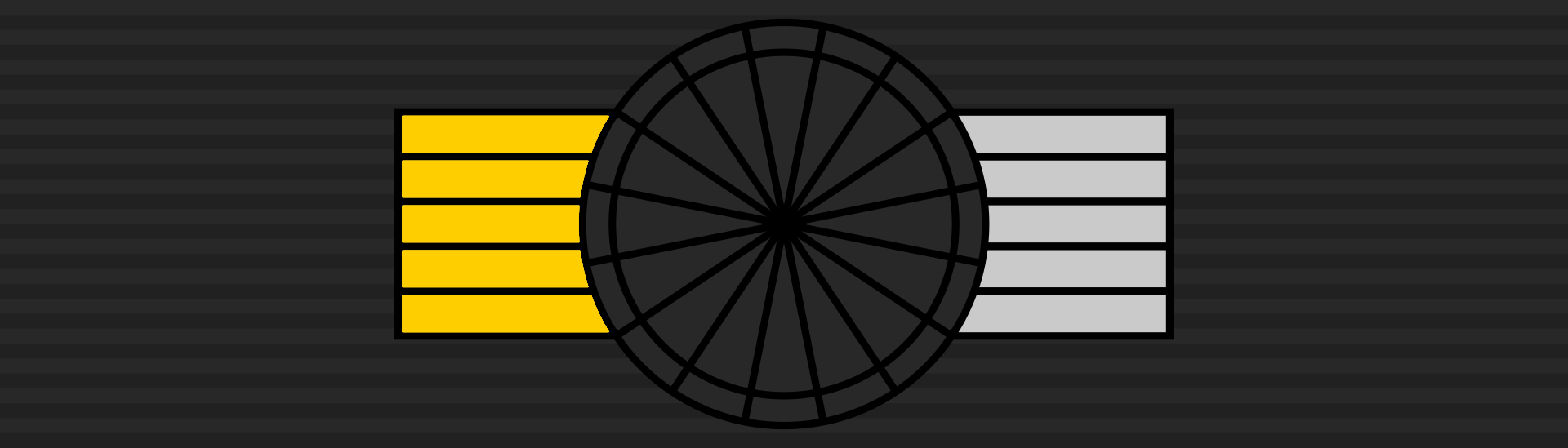
- (Sweden) Commander 1st Class of the Order of the Polar Star (1 December 1903)
- (Sweden) Knight of the Order of the Polar Star (1 December 1895)
- (Sweden) King Gustaf V's Olympic Commemorative Medal (Konung Gustaf V:s olympiska minnesmedalj) (1912)

=== Foreign ===
- (Grand Duchy of Baden) Knight 1st Class of the Order of the Zähringer Lion (1889)
- (Belgium) Commander of the Order of Leopold (1900)
- (Denmark) Grand Cross of the Order of the Dannebrog (1903)
- (Denmark) Commander 2nd Class of the Order of the Dannebrog (1897)
- (France) Commander of the Legion of Honour (1903)
- (France) Officer of the Legion of Honour (1902)
- (Iceland) Knight Grand Cross of the Order of the Falcon (1918)
- Knight of the Order of the Crown of Italy (1889)
- (Netherlands) Commander of the Order of Orange-Nassau (1900)
- (Norway) Knight of the Order of St. Olav (21 January 1899)
- (Iran) Commander 2nd Class of the Order of the Lion and the Sun (1900)
- (Portugal) Commander of the Military Order of Christ (1897)
- (Kingdom of Prussia) Knight 3rd Class of the Order of the Crown (1895)
- (Russian Empire) Knight 2nd Class of the Order of Saint Stanislaus (1894)
- (Kingdom of Serbia) Grand Cross of the Order of St. Sava (1908)
- (Spain) Knight of the Order of Charles III (1889)
- (Thailand) 4th Class of the Order of the Crown of Siam (1887)
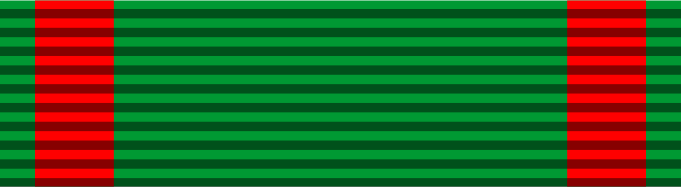
- (Ottoman Empire) 1st Class of the Order of Osmanieh (1903)
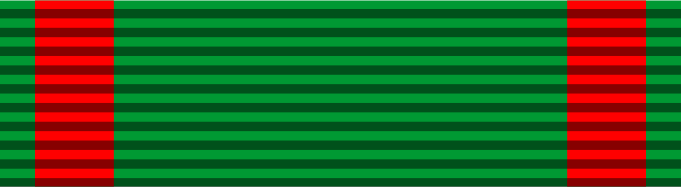
- (Ottoman Empire) 2nd Class of the Order of Osmanieh (1898)
- (Austria-Hungary) Knight 1st Class of the Order of the Iron Crown (1908)
- (Austria-Hungary) Grand Cross of the Order of Leopold (1918)
- (Austria-Hungary) Decoration for Services to the Red Cross, 1st Class with war decoration (20 December 1917)

Diplomatic posts
Preceded by Otto Stenbock	Envoy of Sweden to the Ottoman Empire; 1903–1905	Succeeded by Charles Emil Ramel
Preceded by Gustaf Adolf Sixten Axel August Lewenhaupt	Envoy of Sweden to Austria-Hungary; 1905–1918	Succeeded by Oskar Ewerlöf
Preceded by None	Envoy of Sweden to Romania; 1914–1918	Succeeded by Einar af Wirsén
Preceded by None	Envoy of Sweden to Serbia; 1914–1918	Succeeded by None¹
Preceded by Ernst Axel Günther	Envoy of Sweden to Denmark; 1918–1928	Succeeded by Oskar Ewerlöf
Notes and references
1. The Kingdom of Serbia merged into the Kingdom of Yugoslavia in 1918.
