= Axel Wernhoff =

Swedish politician and diplomat

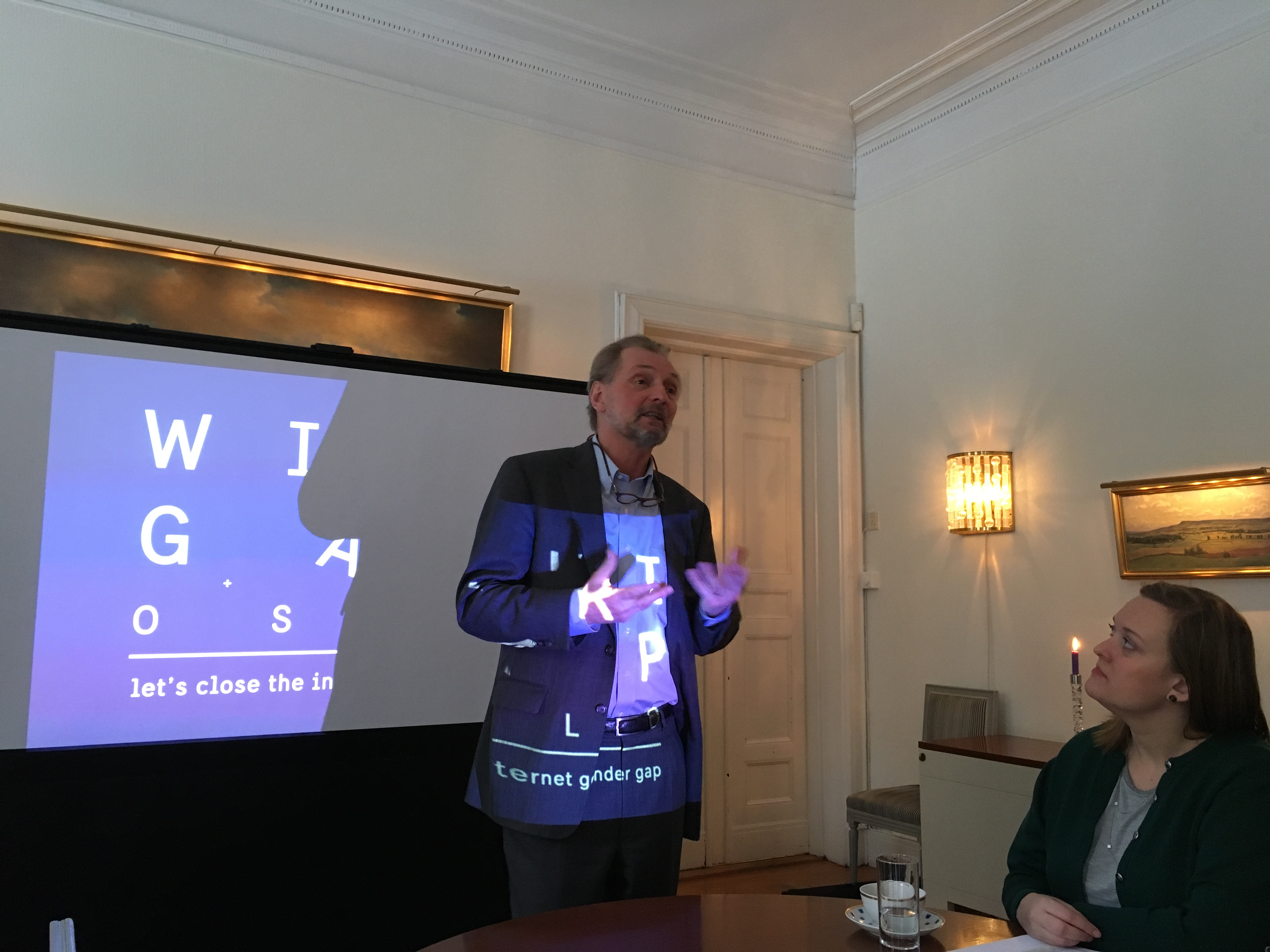
- Wernholff in March 2018

Permanent Representative of Sweden to NATO
- In office 7 March 2024 – 2024
- Preceded by: Himself (as delegate)
- Succeeded by: Jan Knutsson

Permanent Delegate of Sweden to NATO
- In office 1 October 2018 – 6 March 2024
- Preceded by: Håkan Malmqvist
- Succeeded by: Himself (as permanent representatives)

Ambassador of Sweden to Norway
- In office 23 June 2014 – 1 October 2018
- Preceded by: Ingrid Hjelt af Trolle
- Succeeded by: Krister Bringéus

Personal details
- Born: Sture Axel Wernhoff; 23 June 1958 (age 67) Sweden

Sture Axel Wernhoff (born 23 June 1958) is a Swedish diplomat who served as the inaugural Permanent Representative of Sweden to NATO from 7 March 2024.

He was previously the ambassador to Norway from 2014 to 2018, when he was appointed the Permanent Delegate of Sweden to NATO at that time.

== Biography ==
Sture Axel Wernhoff was born on 23 June 1958.

Wernhoff has served at the embassies in Kuala Lumpur and Vienna as well as at the Cabinet Committee and the Ministry of Foreign Affairs' (MFA) ministerial office. He has also been deputy head of the Ministry of Foreign Affairs' unit for the European Union.

On 30 March 2010, Wernhoff was appointed consul general in Jerusalem.

On 26 June 2014, Wernhoff became the ambassador to Norway, taking office in autumn of that same year.

On 1 October 2018, Werhnoff was appointed as head of the Swedish delegation at NATO.

As head of the Swedish delegation, as Sweden made the request to join NATO, Wernhoff delivered Sweden's membership application to NATO Secretary General Jens Stoltenberg on 18 May 2022.

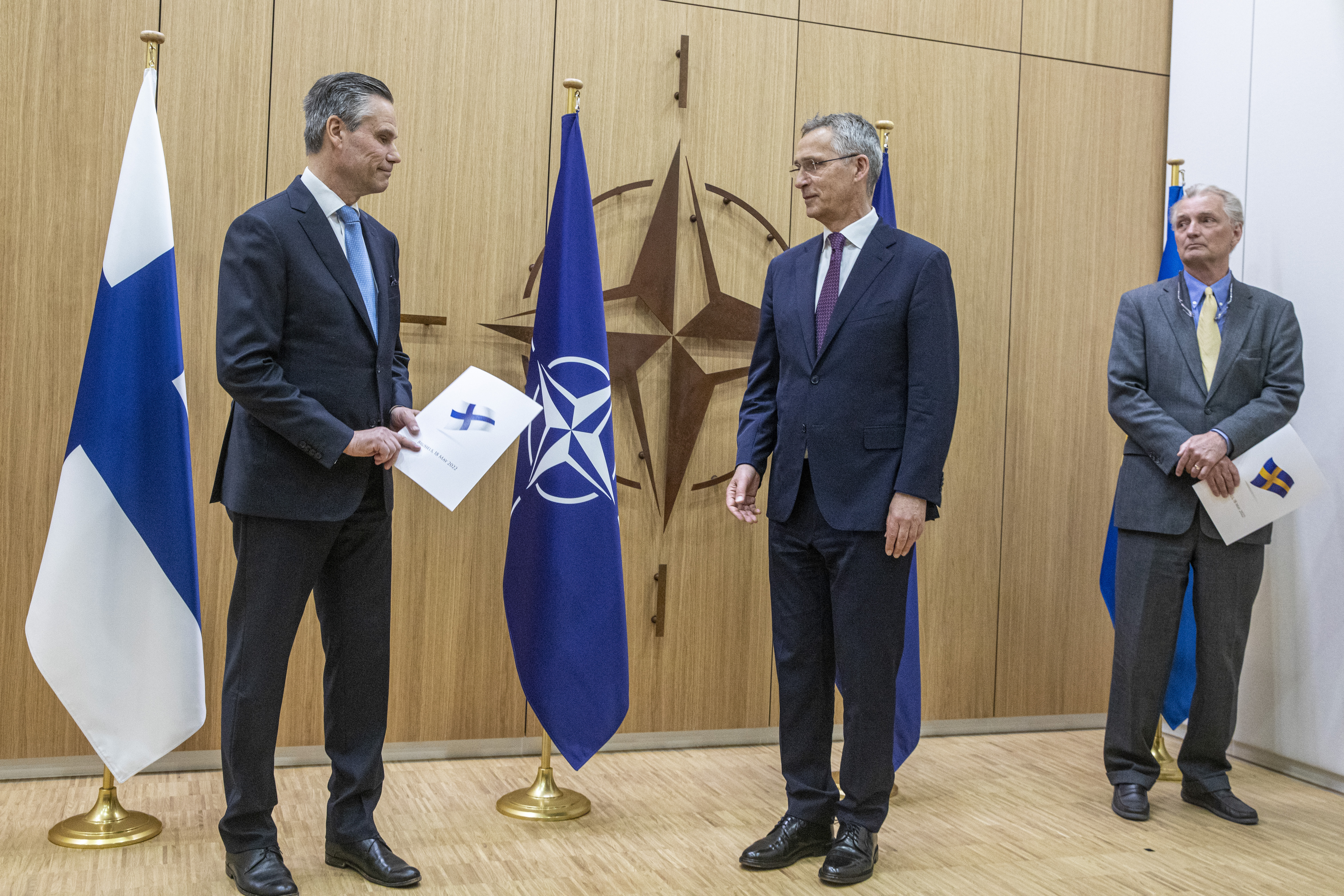
Wernhoff (right) with his Finnish counterpart, Klaus Korhonen, submit their applications to join NATO to secretary general Jens Stoltenberg

On 7 March 2024, he became a member of the North Atlantic Council, as Sweden officially joined NATO.

Diplomatic posts
Preceded by Ingrid Hjelt af Trolle	Ambassador of Sweden to Norway; 2014–2018	Succeeded by Krister Bringéus
Preceded by Håkan Malmqvist	Permanent Delegate/Representative of Sweden to NATO; 2018–2024	Succeeded by Jan Knutsson
