= Permanent Representative of Sweden to the Organization for Security and Co-operation in Europe =

- Lesser coat of arms of the Kingdom of Sweden

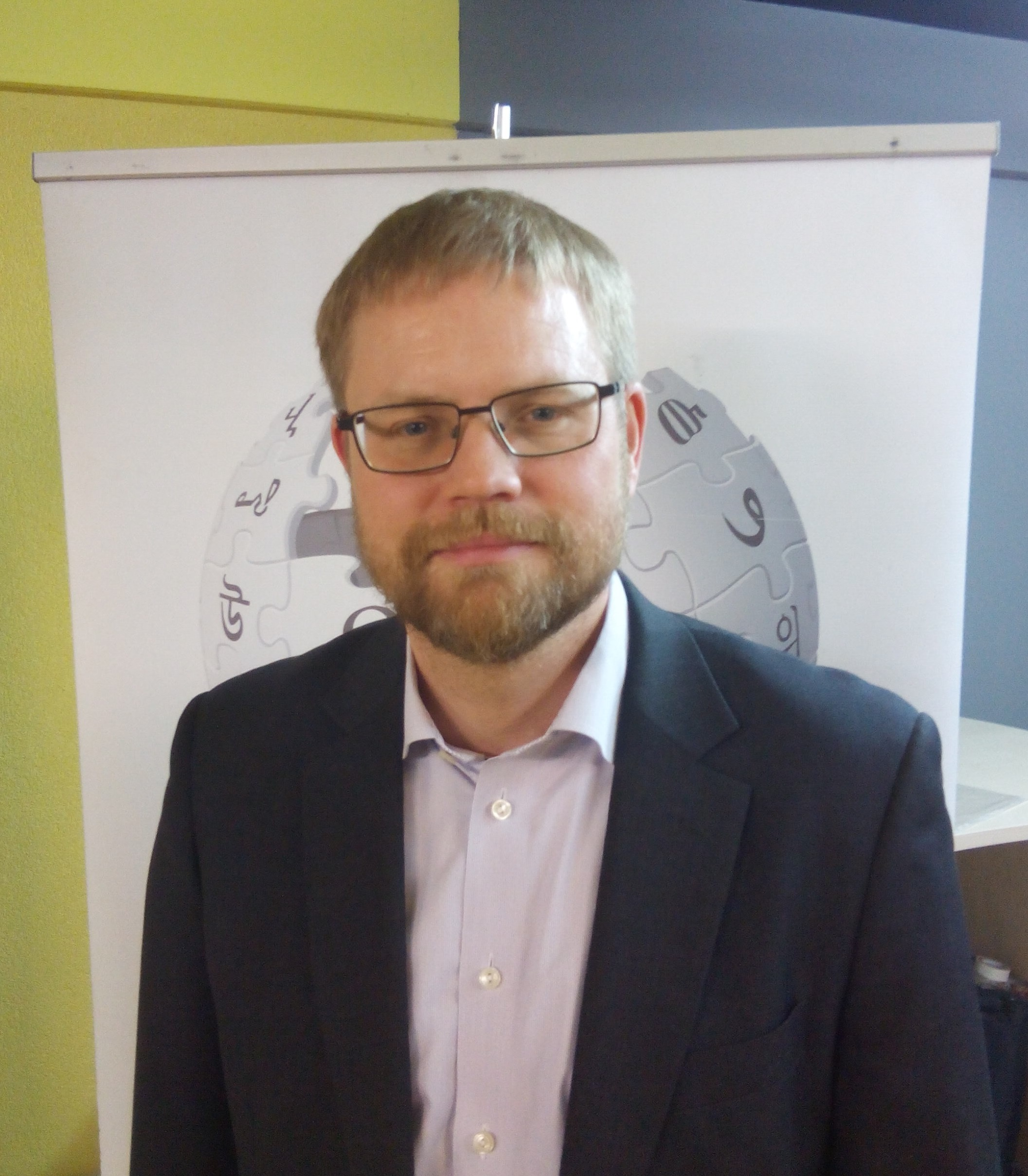
- Incumbent; Martin Hagström since August 2026
- Ministry for Foreign Affairs; Permanent Delegation of Sweden to the OSCE
- Style: His or Her Excellency (formal); Mr. or Madam Ambassador (informal)
- Member of: Organization for Security and Co-operation in Europe
- Reports to: Minister for Foreign Affairs
- Seat: Liechtensteinstraße 51; 1090 Wien; Austria
- Appointer: Government of Sweden
- Term length: No fixed term
- Formation: 1 January 1995
- First holder: Björn Elmér
- Website: www.swedenabroad.se/en/embassies/osce/

The Permanent Representative of Sweden to the Organization for Security and Co-operation in Europe (OSCE) is the head of the Permanent Delegation of Sweden to the OSCE (Swedish: Sveriges ständiga delegation vid organisationen för säkerhet och samarbete i Europa, OSSE) in Vienna, Austria. The permanent representative leads Sweden's delegation in Vienna and represents the country in the Permanent Council, the OSCE's main decision-making body. Their responsibilities include negotiating, advocating for Sweden's priorities, and ensuring Sweden's positions are reflected in OSCE policies. They engage in discussions on security, democracy, human rights, and conflict resolution, contributing to OSCE initiatives such as election observation, media freedom, and confidence-building measures. The permanent representative also plays a role in supporting Sweden's involvement in conflict mediation, including the Minsk Group for Nagorno-Karabakh. Additionally, they coordinate with EU partners and other OSCE members to uphold the organization's principles and commitments.

== History ==
The Organization for Security and Co-operation in Europe (OSCE) traces its origins to the Conference on Security and Co-operation in Europe (CSCE), a platform for dialogue between East and West established in the early 1970s. The concepts of improving relations and implementing the Helsinki Accords were developed over a series of follow-up meetings.

Ambassador Carl Johan Rappe was the head of the Swedish delegation at the Madrid Follow-up Meeting in 1980–81, followed by Ambassador Björn Skala in 1982. From 1983 to 1986, Ambassador Curt Lidgard served as the permanent representative of the Swedish delegation to the Conference on Confidence- and Security-Building Measures and Disarmament in Europe (the Stockholm Conference). He later became the head of the Swedish Delegation to the CSCE Vienna Follow-up Meeting from 1986 to 1988. In 1989, the delegation was renamed the Delegation of Sweden at the Military Negotiations within the CSCE.

In 1993, the United Nations recognized the CSCE as a regional arrangement under Chapter VIII of the United Nations Charter. Two years later, in 1995, the CSCE was renamed the OSCE and established its headquarters in Vienna, Austria. In 1995, it became the Permanent Delegation of Sweden to the Organization for Security and Co-operation in Europe. Ambassador Björn Elmér, who had been Sweden's permanent representative to the CSCE since 1993, became Sweden’s first representative after the name change to OSCE.

== Tasks ==
=== Sweden's role and leadership in the OSCE ===
Sweden has played an active role in the OSCE, with its ambassadors serving as permanent representatives to the organization. The Swedish delegation participates in the Permanent Council in Vienna, which meets weekly and is responsible for the OSCE's ongoing work. The delegation is led by Sweden's Permanent Representative to the OSCE, who represents Swedish interests and contributes to key discussions and decisions.

In 2021, Sweden held the OSCE Chairpersonship, leading the organization's work for a year. In 2025, when Finland assumes the OSCE Chairpersonship, Sweden will chair the Committee on the Human Dimension, a key area focused on human rights, democracy, and the rule of law.

=== Sweden's key priorities in the OSCE ===
- Accountability for Russia's aggression against Ukraine, emphasizing OSCE commitments and principles.
- Support for democracy and human rights, with a focus on election observation, media freedom, and fundamental rights.
- Strengthening OSCE's role in conflict resolution, including Sweden's participation in the Minsk Group for the Nagorno-Karabakh conflict.
- Gender equality as an integrated part of OSCE's security framework.

Sweden also provides financial support to OSCE institutions, election observation missions, and project initiatives. The Swedish membership fee amounts to approximately 48 million SEK annually, with additional contributions to OSCE projects.

== Seat ==
The permanent representative together with the permanent delegation are housed in the same building as the Swedish embassy in Vienna, at Liechtensteinstraße 51 in Alsergrund.

== List of permanent representatives ==
Name	Period	Title	Notes	Presented credentials	Ref
Conference on Security and Co-operation in Europe (CSCE): 1973–1994
Carl Johan Rappe	1980–1981	Ambassador	Madrid Follow-up Meeting (1980–81).		
Björn Skala	1982–1982	Ambassador	Madrid Follow-up Meeting (1982).		
Curt Lidgard	1983–1988	Ambassador	Stockholm Conference (1983–86), Vienna Follow-up Meeting (1986–88).		
Rolf Ekéus	1989–1993	Ambassador			
Björn Elmér	1993 – 31 December 1994	Ambassador			
Organization for Security and Co-operation in Europe (OSCE): 1995–present
Björn Elmér	1 January 1995 – 1997	Ambassador			
Nils Daag	1997–2002	Ambassador			
Krister Bringéus	2002–2006	Ambassador			
Veronika Bard Bringéus	2007–2012	Ambassador			
Fredrik Löjdquist	2012–2017	Ambassador			
Ulrika Funered	1 September 2017 – 2022	Ambassador			
Anna Olsson Vrang	15 August 2022 – 2026	Ambassador	Appointed on 3 March 2022	31 August 2022.	
Martin Hagström	August 2026 – present	Ambassador			
