= Jan Knutsson =

Swedish politician and diplomat

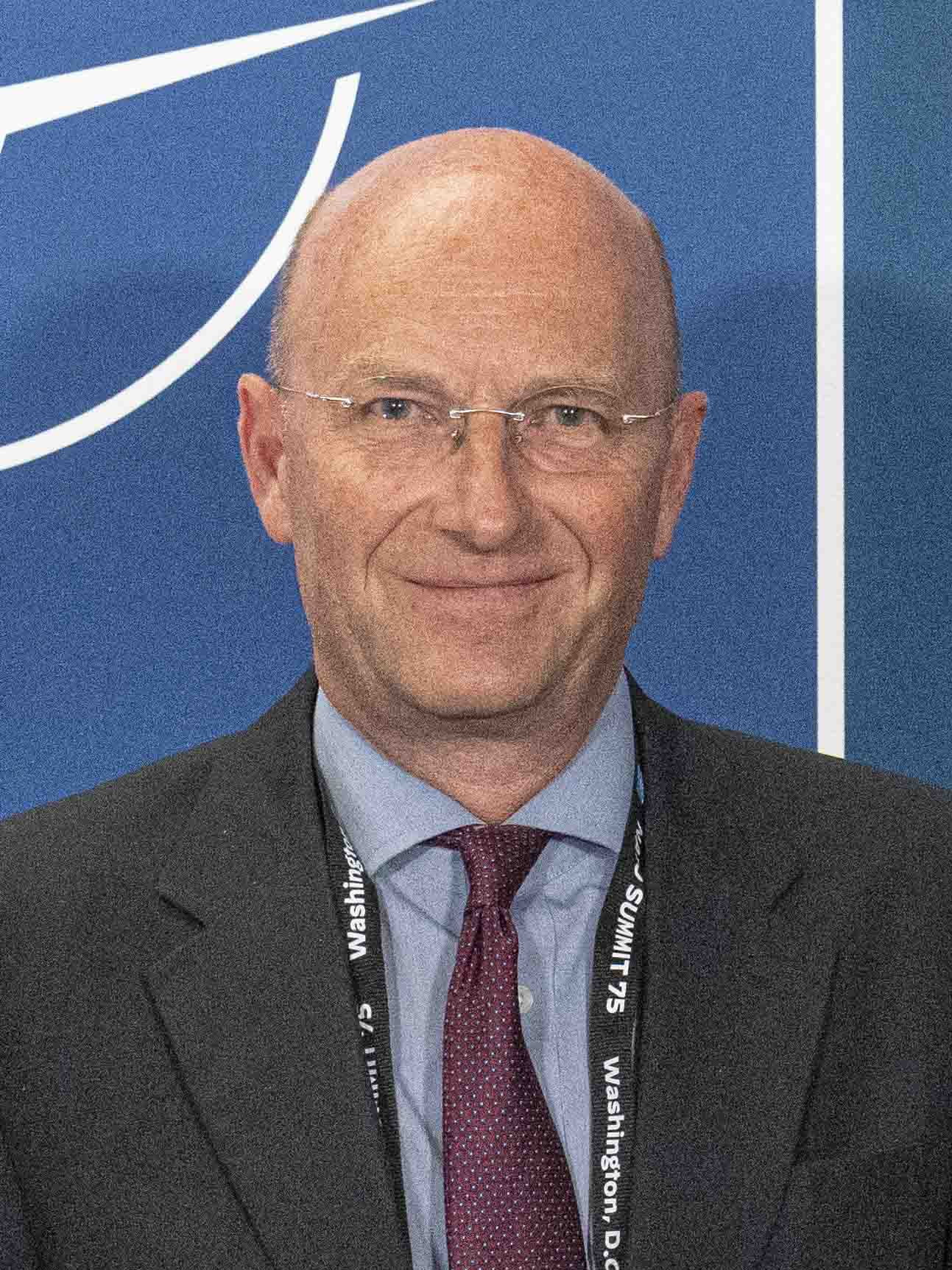
- Knutsson in July 2024

Permanent Representative of Sweden to NATO
- Incumbent
- Assumed office 25 August 2024
- Preceded by: Axel Wernhoff

State Secretary for Foreign Affairs
- In office 2022–2024
- Preceded by: Robert Rydberg
- Succeeded by: Dag Hartelius

Personal details
- Born: Jan Ingemar Knutsson; 21 April 1958 (age 68) Skurup, Sweden

Jan Ingemar Knutsson (born 21 April 1958), is a Swedish politician and diplomat who has been the Permanent Representative of Sweden to NATO since 25 August 2024.

== Biography ==
Jan Knutsson was born on 21 April 1958.

He has been head of Sweden's representation at the international organizations in Geneva, Foreign Council for international development cooperation and head of the Global Security Unit. He has also been Sweden's ambassador to Saudi Arabia until 2019, where became the Ambassador to Switzerland.

Between 2022 and 2024 he served as the state secretary for foreign affairs at the Ministry for Foreign Affairs in the Kristersson cabinet.

On 20 June 2024, he was appointed as the Permanent Representative of Sweden to NATO, succeeding Axel Wernhoff on the post. He officially took office on 25 August.

Diplomatic posts
Preceded by Hans Dahlgren	Permanent Representative of Sweden to the United Nations in Geneva; 2010–2015	Succeeded by Veronika Bard Bringéus
Preceded by Dag Juhlin-Dannfelt	Ambassador of Sweden to Saudi Arabia; 2016–2019	Succeeded by Niclas Trouvé
Preceded by Magnus Hartog-Holm	Ambassador of Sweden to Switzerland; 2019–2022	Succeeded by Carl Magnus Nesser
Preceded by Robert Rydberg	State Secretary for Foreign Affairs; 2022–2024	Succeeded by Dag Hartelius
Preceded by Axel Wernhoff	Permanent Representative of Sweden to NATO; 2024–present	Succeeded by Incumbent
