= Klaus Korhonen =

Finnish diplomat

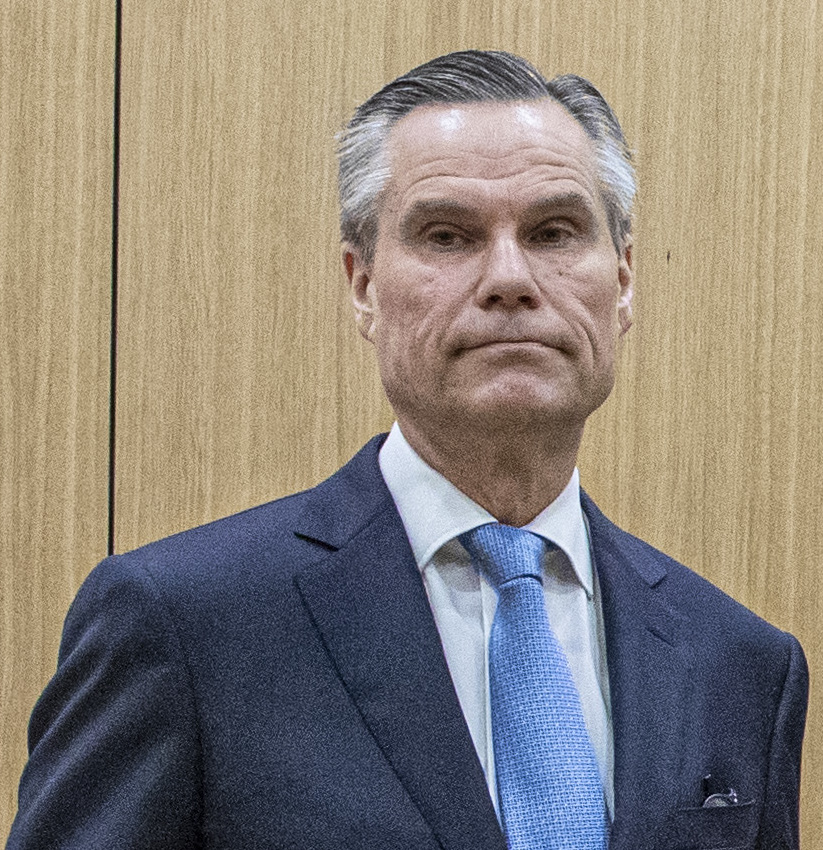
- Korhonen in May 2022

Finnish Ambassador to NATO
- In office 2023 – November 2023

Personal details
- Born: 1961 (age 63–64); Finland

Klaus Korhonen (born in 1961), is a Finnish diplomat.

He was Ambassador and Head of Mission of Finland to NATO 2019-2023 and, after Finland’s accession to the Alliance 4 April 2024, the first Finnish Permanent Representative to the Alliance.

Ambassador Korhonen works currently at the Ministry for Foreign Affairs of Finland in Helsinki.

In February 2024 Korhonen was elected as the Chairman of the Board of Finnish Institute of International Affairs (FIIA).

== Biography ==
Klaus Korhonen was born in 1961.

He graduated from the University of Helsinki in 1986, with a Masters of Social Sciences.

Korhonen joined the Ministry of Foreign Affairs of Finland in 1987.

From 2009 to 2013, he was Ambassador of Finland to the Netherlands and Permanent Representative to the Organisation for the Prohibition of Chemical Weapons (OPCW).

He served as Ambassador for Arms Control at the Ministry for Foreign Affairs 2013-2017.

Korhonen was President of the international Arms Trade Treaty 2016-2017 (ATT Third Conference of States Parties).

Korhonen delivered Finland's membership application to NATO to Secretary General Jens Stoltenberg on 18 May 2022.

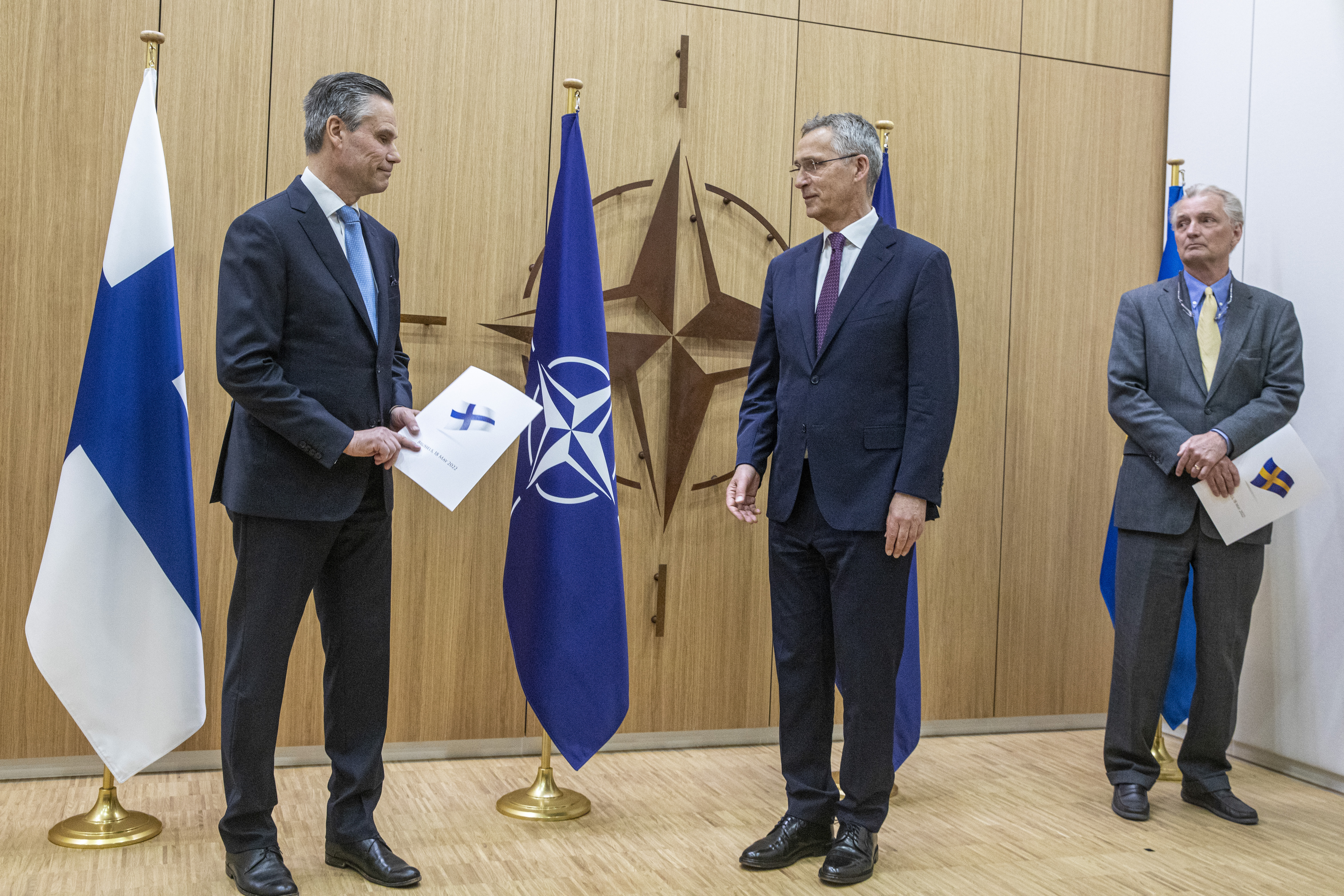
Korhonen (left) with his Swedish counterpart, Axel Wernhoff, submit their applications to join NATO to secretary general Jens Stoltenberg

In 2023, he is part of the North Atlantic Council, as Finland officially joined NATO.

In August 2023, he left the North Atlantic Council, and was succeeded by Piritta Asunmaa.

In February 2024, Korhonen was named chairman of the board of the Finnish Institute of International Affairs.
