= Permanent Representative of Sweden to NATO =

- Lesser coat of arms of the Kingdom of Sweden

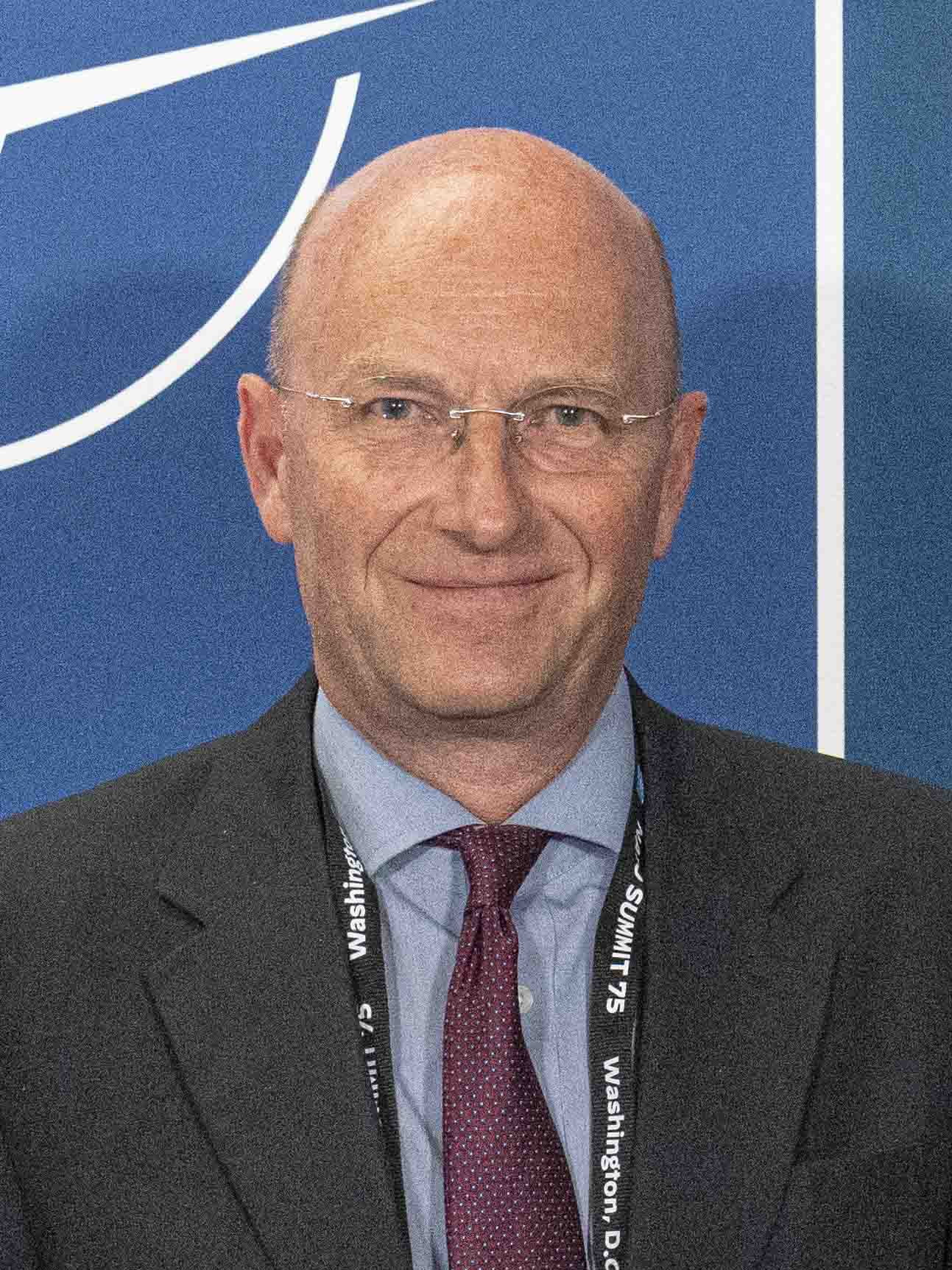
- Incumbent; Jan Knutsson since 25 August 2024
- Ministry for Foreign Affairs; Permanent Mission of Sweden to NATO
- Style: His or Her Excellency (formal); Mr. or Madam Ambassador (informal)
- Reports to: Minister for Foreign Affairs
- Seat: Manfred Wörner Building; Boulevard Leopold III; 1110 Brussels, Belgium
- Appointer: Government of Sweden
- Term length: No fixed term
- Formation: 1997
- First holder: Göran Berg
- Website: www.swedenabroad.se/en/embassies/brussels-nato/

The Permanent Representative of Sweden to NATO heads the Permanent Mission of Sweden to NATO in Brussels, Belgium. Sweden's relationship with NATO began in 1994 when it joined the Partnership for Peace, followed by membership in the Euro-Atlantic Partnership Council in 1997. That same year, Sweden appointed its ambassador in Brussels as its representative to NATO, signaling deeper cooperation while maintaining military non-alignment. The country strengthened its military and political presence in Brussels and emphasized transparency, interoperability, and effective crisis management in NATO-led operations.

In 1998, Sweden established a dedicated NATO delegation in Brussels, which evolved over time into a distinct diplomatic mission. After formally applying in May 2022, Sweden became a full NATO member in March 2024. The delegation was then renamed the Permanent Mission of Sweden to NATO. Today, Sweden's NATO ambassador represents national interests in key NATO bodies and maintains active diplomatic engagement to shape alliance decisions in line with Swedish security policy.

== History ==
=== Background ===
Sweden's relationship with NATO dates back to 1994, when it joined the Partnership for Peace (PfP), a program aimed at building trust and facilitating cooperation between NATO and non-member countries in the Euro-Atlantic area. In 1997, Sweden also became a member of the Euro-Atlantic Partnership Council (EAPC), a forum for political dialogue among all NATO member states and partner countries in the Euro-Atlantic region.

Following NATO's 1997 Madrid summit invitation for partner countries to establish delegations and appoint ambassadors, Sweden designated its ambassador in Brussels as its representative to NATO. This reflected Sweden's deepening engagement in the Partnership for Peace (PFP) and the Euro-Atlantic Partnership Council (EAPC). To enhance its influence and insight, Sweden also strengthened its military presence at its Brussels embassy and planned for broader participation in NATO's military committees. Sweden emphasized the importance of transparency and influence for troop-contributing nations in NATO-led crisis management operations. It supported creating a permanent political-military framework for such missions and aimed to improve interoperability and coordination, particularly based on experiences from operations in Bosnia (IFOR/SFOR). The Swedish government sought to develop planning and review processes, introduce non-binding partnership goals, and enhance Sweden's international operational capacity while maintaining national decision-making freedom. Cooperation with Nordic countries and civil-military coordination (including within the UN) were also prioritized.

Parliamentary motions showed varying political perspectives:

- Moderate Party supported deeper NATO cooperation and regional military collaboration, especially with the Baltic states.
- Liberal People's Party favored EU and NATO openness, criticized Sweden's hesitation to back Baltic NATO membership.
- Christian Democrats called for a civil defense delegation at NATO and annual government updates on cooperation.
- Green Party and Left Party opposed deepened NATO integration, citing threats to military non-alignment and preference for UN/OSCE-led peace efforts.

In summary, Sweden was taking active steps toward greater NATO partnership without formally abandoning military non-alignment, balancing national sovereignty with increased international cooperation.

=== 1998–present ===
Sweden's first NATO ambassador, who also served as Sweden's ambassador in Brussels, Göran Berg, took office in 1998. His formal title was Representative of Sweden Within the Framework of EAPC and Cooperation Within PfP at NATO (Note: Swedish: Sveriges ombud inom ramen för EAPR och samarbetet inom PFF vid NATO). That same year, Anders Oljelund was appointed the new ambassador to Brussels and thus also became Sweden's new NATO ambassador. Officially, this was a delegation under the Swedish embassy in Brussels, but it had four times as many staff as the embassy itself. In practice, it functioned as two separate embassies.

In 2000, the delegation was renamed Embassy of Sweden – Mission to NATO and Delegation to WEU (Note: Swedish: Sveriges ambassad – Delegationen vid NATO och Västeuropeiska unionen) after the ambassador also became Sweden's delegate to the Western European Union (WEU). In 2003, the name changed again to Delegation of Sweden to NATO (Note: Swedish: Sveriges delegation vid NATO), and from that year onward, the Swedish ambassador in Brussels no longer held the dual role of ambassador to both Belgium and NATO.

On 18 May 2022, Sweden submitted its application for NATO membership, and on 7 March 2024, it became a full member of the alliance. In conjunction with Sweden's accession in March 2024, the delegation was renamed Permanent Mission of Sweden to NATO. (Note: Swedish: Sveriges ständiga representation vid Nato)

== Tasks ==
Since becoming a full member of NATO in March 2024, Sweden is represented at NATO Headquarters in Brussels through its Permanent Representation. The Swedish NATO Ambassador leads this mission and is responsible for advancing Sweden's interests within NATO. This includes representing and promoting Sweden's security, defence, and military policies across NATO's decision-making bodies—primarily the North Atlantic Council (NAC), which is NATO's highest political authority, and the Military Committee, which advises on military policy and strategy.

The ambassador's role extends beyond formal participation in these committees. A key part of the work involves maintaining active dialogue with other NATO member states and engaging with the NATO Secretariat through ongoing informal meetings and diplomatic contacts. This ensures Sweden stays well-integrated in discussions, builds consensus, and influences NATO's direction in line with Swedish priorities.

== List of delegates and representatives ==
Name	Period	Title	Notes	Ref
Representative of Sweden Within the Framework of EAPC and Cooperation Within PfP at NATO
Göran Berg	1997–1998	Ambassador	Also ambassador of Sweden to Belgium.	(Note: Sweden designated its ambassador in Brussels (Göran Berg) as its representative to NATO in 1997. He took office in 1998.)
Anders Oljelund	1998–1999	Ambassador	Also ambassador of Sweden to Belgium.	
Permanent Delegate of Sweden to NATO and the Western European Union
Anders Oljelund	2000–2003	Ambassador	Also ambassador of Sweden to Belgium.	
Permanent Delegate of Sweden to NATO
Per Anderman	2003–2007	Ambassador	Minister 2001–2002.	
Veronika Wand-Danielsson	2007–2014	Ambassador		
Håkan Malmqvist	2014–2018	Ambassador		
Axel Wernhoff	1 October 2018 – 6 March 2024	Ambassador		
Permanent Representative of Sweden to NATO
Axel Wernhoff	7 March 2024 – Autumn 2024	Ambassador		
Jan Knutsson	Autumn 2024–present	Ambassador		

== Gallery ==
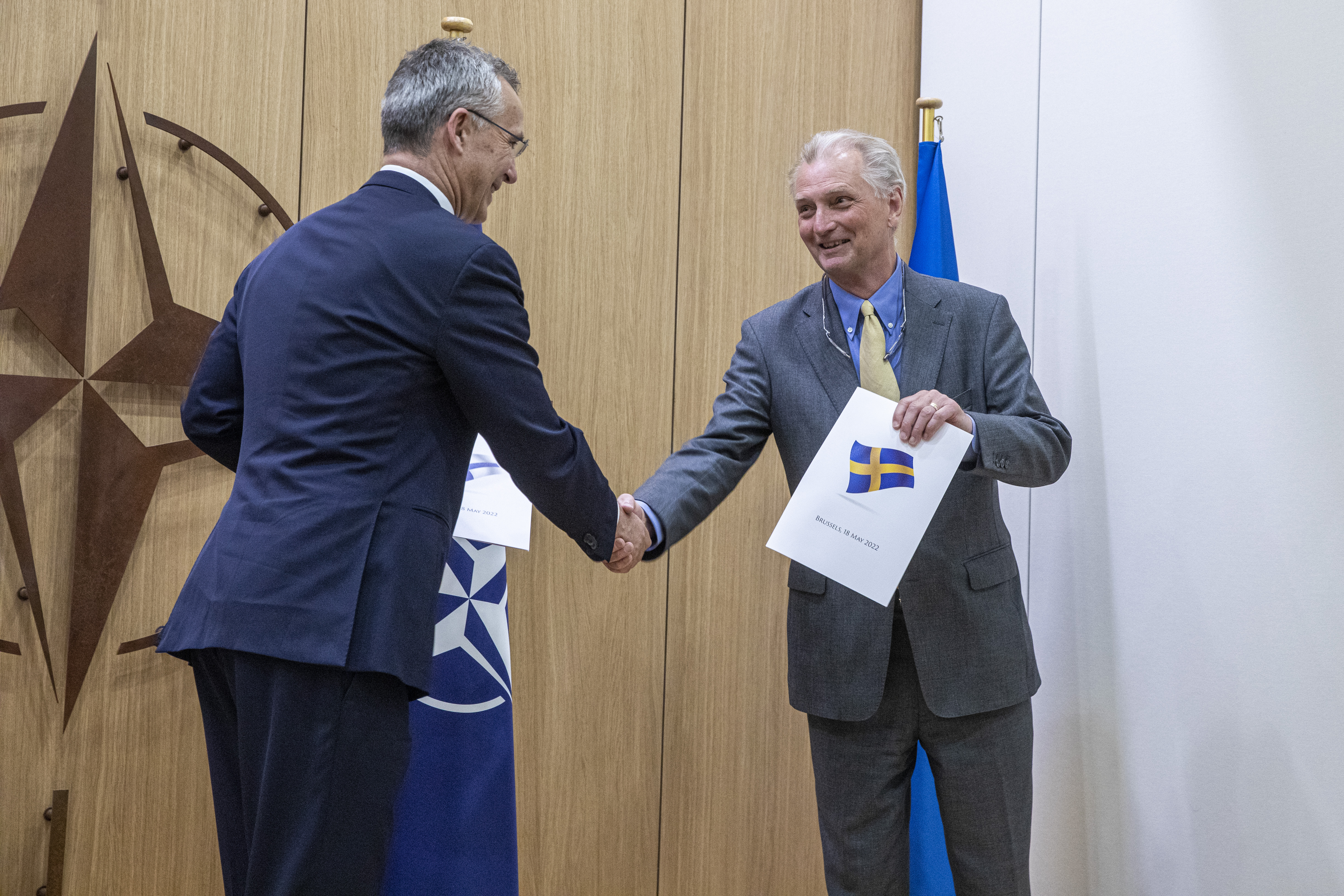
Ambassador Axel Wernhoff (right) and Jens Stoltenberg

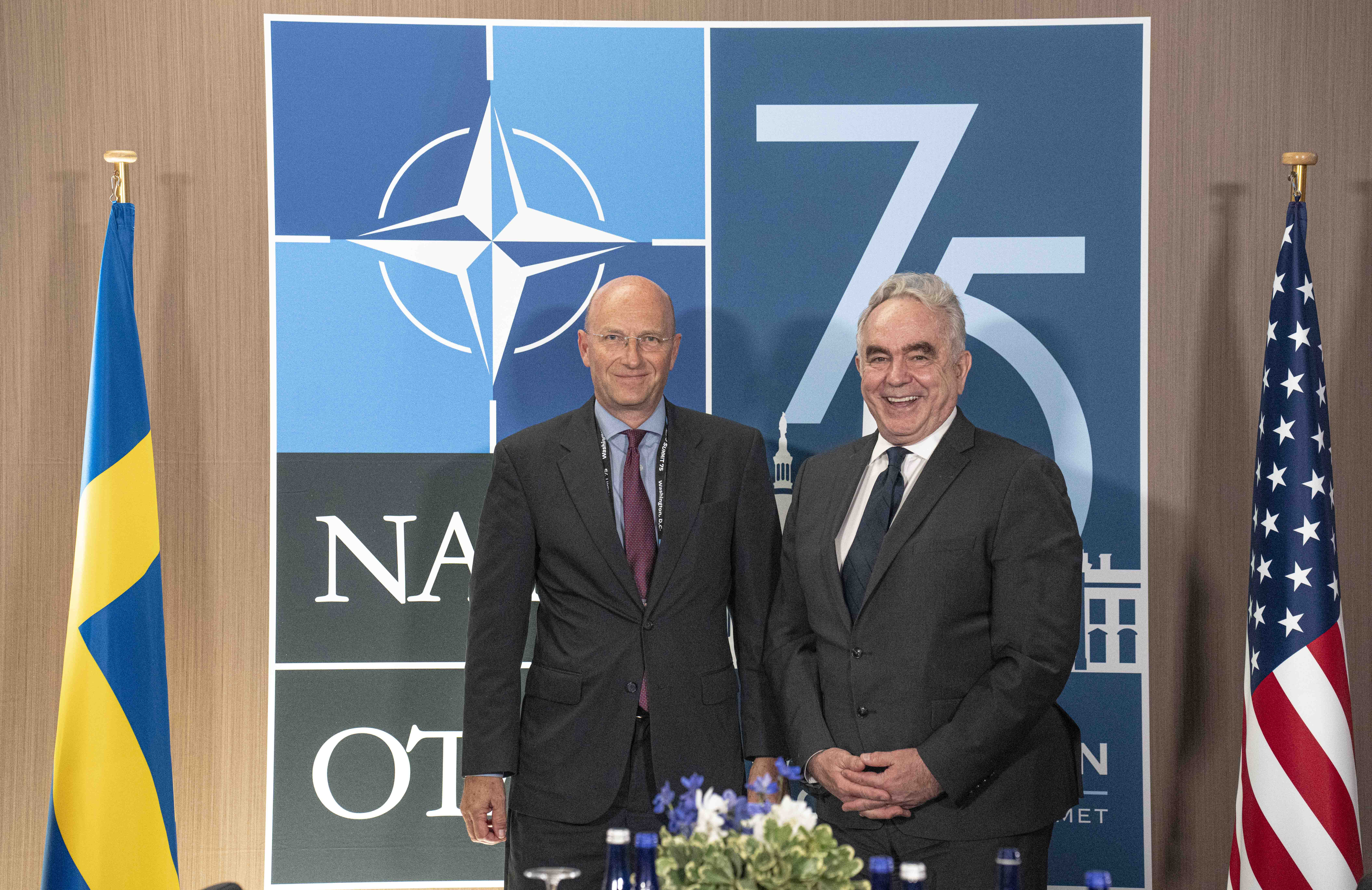
Ambassador Jan Knutsson (left) and Kurt M. Campbell

== See also ==
- Sweden–NATO relations
