= Einar af Wirsén =

Swedish Army officer, diplomat and writer

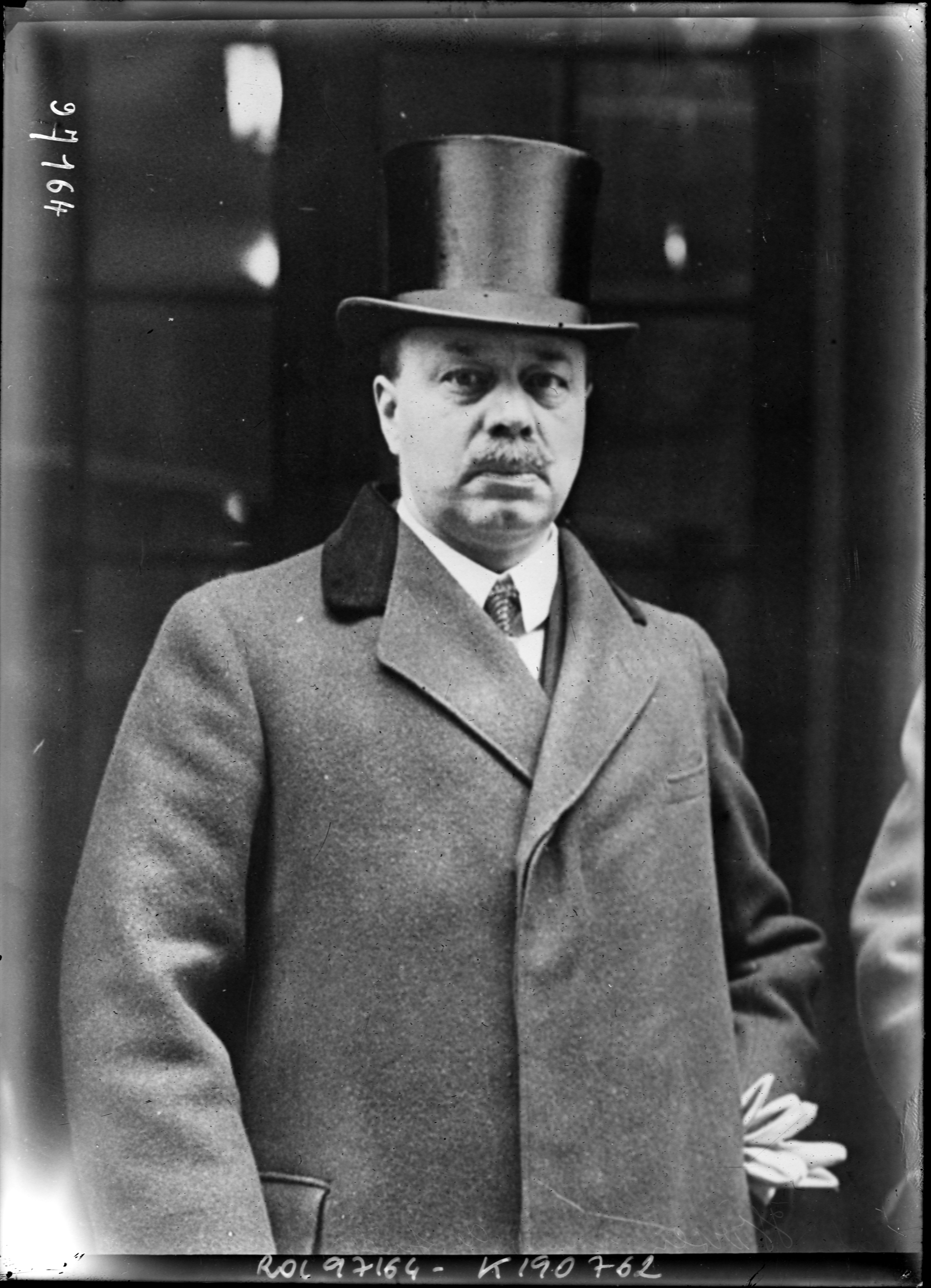
- af Wirsén in 1924

Envoy of Sweden to Romania
- In office 26 September 1921 – 5 November 1924
- Preceded by: Joachim Beck-Friis
- Succeeded by: Jonas Alströmer

Envoy of Sweden to Greece
- In office 26 September 1921 – 5 November 1924
- Preceded by: None
- Succeeded by: Jonas Alströmer

Envoy of Sweden to Yugoslavia
- In office 1 January 1922 – 5 November 1924
- Preceded by: None
- Succeeded by: Jonas Alströmer

Envoy of Sweden to the German Reich
- In office 26 September 1925 – 1937
- Preceded by: Fredrik Ramel
- Succeeded by: Arvid Richert

Envoy of Sweden to Italy
- In office 1937–1940
- Preceded by: Erik Sjöborg
- Succeeded by: Hans Gustaf Beck-Friis

Personal details
- Born: Carl Einar Thure af Wirsén; 20 April 1875 Uppsala, Sweden
- Died: 5 January 1946 (aged 70)
- Resting place: Uppsala old cemetery
- Occupation: Diplomat, writer, soldier

Military service
- Allegiance: Sweden
- Branch/service: Swedish Army
- Years of service: 1895–1914, 1917–1920
- Rank: Major
- Unit: Svea Life Guards

Carl Einar Thure af Wirsén (20 April 1875 – 5 January 1946) was a Swedish Army officer, diplomat and writer. Originally an officer, he was sent into the diplomatic service after World War I and served as a military attaché in Constantinople and Sofia where he witnessed the Armenian genocide. From the Ottoman Empire and the Balkans, af Wirsén came to Poland and witnessed the country's resurrection. After serving in London, Reval and Riga, he was sent as envoy to Bucharest, Athens and Belgrade in 1921. After working in the Mosul Commission, af Wirsén was sent to Berlin, where he would stay for the next 12 years as envoy. Finally he was envoy in Rome for three years before retiring in 1940.

== Early life ==
Einar af Wirsén was born on 20 April 1875 in Uppsala, Sweden, the son of poet and literary critic Carl David af Wirsén and Cecilia Emerentia Leontina (née Adlöf). He became a volunteer in the Svea Life Guards in 1891, passed mogenhetsexamen in 1893 and was promoted to sergeant in 1894. af Wirsén enrolled at the Royal Military Academy on 16 August 1894, was promoted to fanjunkare in 1895 and graduated from the Royal Military Academy on 20 November the same year.

== Career ==
af Wirsén became a second lieutenant in the Svea Life Guards in 1895, was promoted to lieutenant in 1897 and attended the Royal Swedish Army Staff College from 1900 to 1902. He was appointed attaché in 1903 and was an aspirant at the General Staff from 1904 to 1906. He was promoted to captain in the Svea Life Guards in 1909. af Wirsén served on the General Staff from 1910 to 1914. He became a teacher at the Royal Swedish Army Staff College in 1911 and was then military attaché in Constantinople and Sofia from 1915 to 1920. Whilst in Constantinople and Sofia, he witnessed the Armenian genocide along with the military operations in the Dardanelles in 1915–16 and the military operations in Macedonia in 1918. af Wirsén was promoted to major in the Swedish Army in 1917 and major in the Göta Life Guards in 1920.

He was acting extra second legation secretary in Warsaw from 15 January to 31 March 1921 and was appointed acting extra first legation secretary at the Ministry for Foreign Affairs on 8 April the same year. af Wirsén was acting first legation secretary in London from 28 April to 2 July 1921 and was appointed chargé d'affaires ad interim in Reval and Riga on 24 June 1921. He was appointed envoy in Bucharest, Athens and Belgrade (accredited from Bucharest) on 26 September 1921, staying in this position until the 5 November 1924 when he took a leave of absence.

af Wirsén was, from 1924 to 1925, the president of the League of Nations Council-appointed investigation commission for the submission of proposals for the border between Turkey and Iraq (the Mosul Commission) and had a significant share in its thorough report, which formed the basis for the Council decision. af Wirsén served his mission in a very satisfactory manner, and skilfully preserved the integrity of the commission, including in relation to quite tangible British pressure. He was then appointed an envoy in Berlin on 26 September 1925 and became major in the Svea Life Guards reserve on 8 January 1926. He stayed at his post in Berlin until 1937 and then became an envoy in Rome from 1937 to 1940.

== Personal life ==
On 26 January 1910 he married Jeanne Maria Käthie Ingeldi (25 July 1881 in Kristinehamn – 21 December 1920 in Montreux). On 1 February 1922 in Engelbrekt Church, Stockholm he married his cousin's daughter Ebba Elsa Cecilia Hildebrand (5 April 1903 – 26 September 1991; both in Stockholm), the daughter of chairman of the board of the Swedish National Debt Office, Karl Emil Hildebrand and Elisabet af Geijerstam. af Wirsén had three daughters;

- Käthie Madeleine Carola Cecilia (married Landenius) (18 May 1912 in Stockholm – 26 September 1996)
- Ulla Elisabet (born 11 October 1922 in Sinaia, Romania – 9 September 1976)
- Diane Augusta (born 21 April 1935 in Berlin)

Einar af Wirsén died on 5 January 1946 and was buried 15 days later in Uppsala old cemetery in his hometown.

== Awards and decorations ==
af Wirsén's awards:

- King Gustaf V's Jubilee Commemorative Medal (1928)
- Commander Grand Cross of the Order of the Polar Star (1932)
- Knight of the Order of the Sword (1916)
- Knight of the Order of Vasa (1914)
- Grand Cross of the Order of the Crown of Italy
- Grand Cross of the Order of the Three Stars (1930)
- Grand Cross of the Order of the Star of Romania (1925)
- Grand Cross of the Order of the Crown (1922)
- Grand Cross of the Saxe-Ernestine House Order
- Grand Cross of the Order of St. Sava (1922)
- Commander of the Order of Military Merit (1922)
- Third Class of the Order of the Medjidie (1916)
- Officer of the Order of Saint Alexander with swords (1919)
- Knight of the Order of the Dannebrog (1912)
- Knight of the Order of Saints Maurice and Lazarus (1913)
- Knight Third Class of the Order of Saint Anna (1909)
- Member of the Royal Swedish Academy of War Sciences (1915)

== Bibliography ==
- Wirsén, Einar af (1943). Från Balkan till Berlin [From the Balkans to Berlin] (in Swedish). Stockholm: Bonnier. SELIBR 1456246.
- Wirsén, Einar af (1943). Finlands framtid [Finland's future] (in Swedish). Stockholm: Inapress. SELIBR 1239741.
- Wirsén, Einar af (1942). Minnen från fred och krig [Memories of peace and war] (in Swedish). Stockholm: Bonnier. SELIBR 603577.
- Wirsén, Einar af (1942). Ryska problem [Russian problems] (in Swedish). Stockholm: Bonnier. SELIBR 1456247.
- Wirsén, Einar af (1942). Funderingar om Ryssland [Reflection on Russia] (in Swedish). Gothenburg. SELIBR 3181839.
- Wirsén, Einar af; Teleki von Szék, Pàl; Paulis, A. (1925). Question de la frontière entre la Turquie et l'Irak: rapport présenté au Conseil par la Commission constituée en vertu de la résolution du 30 septembre 1924 [Question of the border between Turkey and Iraq: report presented to the Council by the Commission acting under the resolution of September 30, 1924] (in French). [Geneva]. SELIBR 3181841.
- Wirsén, Einar af (1915). Första världskrigsåret: en återblick [The first year of World War I: in retrospect] (in Swedish). Stockholm: Norstedt. SELIBR 1641651.
- Wirsén, Einar af (1914). Härordningsfrågans hufvudpunkt: ett inlägg i diskussionen om infanteriets utbildningstid [The main point of the question of the army divisions: a contribution to the discussion of infantry training time] (in Swedish). Stockholm: Komiterade för Sveriges försvarsföreningar. SELIBR 1641652.
- Wirsén, Einar af (1914). Slaget vid Amiens den 27 november 1870 och händelserna omedelbart efter slaget [Battle of Amiens November 27, 1870 and the events immediately after the battle] (in Swedish). Stockholm. SELIBR 3181840.
- Wirsén, Einar af (1914). Mål och medel för infanteriets utbildning [Objectives and means for infantry training] (in Swedish). Gothenburg. SELIBR 1641653.
- Keith (pseudonym) (1914). Kan frågan om infanteriets utbildningstid utbrytas ur härordningsfrågan i öfrigt? [Can the question of infantry training time be taken out of the question of the army divisions in general?] (in Swedish). Stockholm. SELIBR 3125863.
- Wirsén, Einar af (1911). Cavour: med 5 bilder [Cavour: with 5 images] (in Swedish). Stockholm. SELIBR 3181838.
- Keith (pseudonym) (1911). Den svenska folkhären [The Swedish People's Army] (in Swedish) (1st ed.). Stockholm: Norstedt. SELIBR 1635468.
- Wirsén, Einar af (1909). Balkanfolken och stormakterna: historiskt politiska orientstudier [Balkan people and the great powers: historical policy orient studies] (in Swedish). Uppsala: Akademiska bokförl. SELIBR 1619072.
- Wirsén, Einar af (1908). Sjötransporter, landstigningar och kustförsvar: några erfarenheter från en samöfning mellan fälttrupper, flotta och landstorm i Italien : Föredrag [Maritime transport, landings and coastal defense: some experiences from a joint exercise between the field troops, navy and landsturm in Italy: Lecture] (in Swedish). Stockholm: Norstedt. SELIBR 1619073.

Diplomatic posts
Preceded by Joachim Beck-Friis	Envoy of Sweden to Romania; 1921–1924	Succeeded by Jonas Alströmer
Preceded by None	Envoy of Sweden to Greece; 1921–1924	Succeeded by Jonas Alströmer
Preceded by None	Envoy of Sweden to Yugoslavia; 1922–1924	Succeeded by Jonas Alströmer
Preceded by Fredrik Ramel	Envoy of Sweden to the German Reich; 1925–1937	Succeeded by Arvid Richert
Preceded by Erik Sjöborg	Envoy of Sweden to Italy; 1937–1940	Succeeded by Hans Gustaf Beck-Friis
