= List of ambassadors of Sweden to Montenegro =

Ambassador of Sweden to Montenegro
- Lesser coat of arms of the Kingdom of Sweden
- Incumbent; Charlotte Sammelin since 15 August 2024
- Ministry for Foreign Affairs; Swedish Embassy, Belgrade
- Style: His or Her Excellency (formal); Mr. or Madam Ambassador (informal)
- Reports to: Minister for Foreign Affairs
- Seat: Belgrade, Serbia (Note: Since 2006, the Swedish ambassador to Montenegro is based in Belgrade, Serbia.)
- Appointer: Government of Sweden
- Term length: No fixed term
- Inaugural holder: Lars-Göran Engfeldt
- Formation: 2006

The Ambassador of Sweden to Montenegro (known formally as the Ambassador of the Kingdom of Sweden to Montenegro) is the official representative of the government of Sweden to the president of Montenegro and government of Montenegro. Since Sweden does not have an embassy in Podgorica, Sweden's ambassador to Montenegro is based in Belgrade, Serbia.

== History ==
Sweden recognized Montenegro as a sovereign state on 14 June 2006. The Swedish government decided on 21 June 2006 to establish diplomatic relations with Montenegro. The government of Montenegro was notified of the Swedish government's decision on the same day. The agreement entered into force on 26 June 2006.

Sweden's ambassador in Belgrade has been concurrently accredited to Montenegro's capital, Podgorica, since 2006.

== List of representatives ==
Name	Period	Title	Notes	Presented credentials	Ref
Lars-Göran Engfeldt	2006–2006	Ambassador	Resident in Belgrade.		
Krister Bringéus	2007–2010	Ambassador	Resident in Belgrade.		
Christer Asp	2010–2016	Ambassador	Resident in Belgrade.	16 November 2010	
Jan Lundin	2016–2021	Ambassador	Resident in Belgrade.	26 July 2016	
Annika Ben David	2021–2024	Ambassador	Resident in Belgrade.	9 December 2021	
Charlotte Sammelin	15 August 2024 – present	Ambassador	Resident in Belgrade.	25 March 2025	
