= Croatia–Sweden relations =

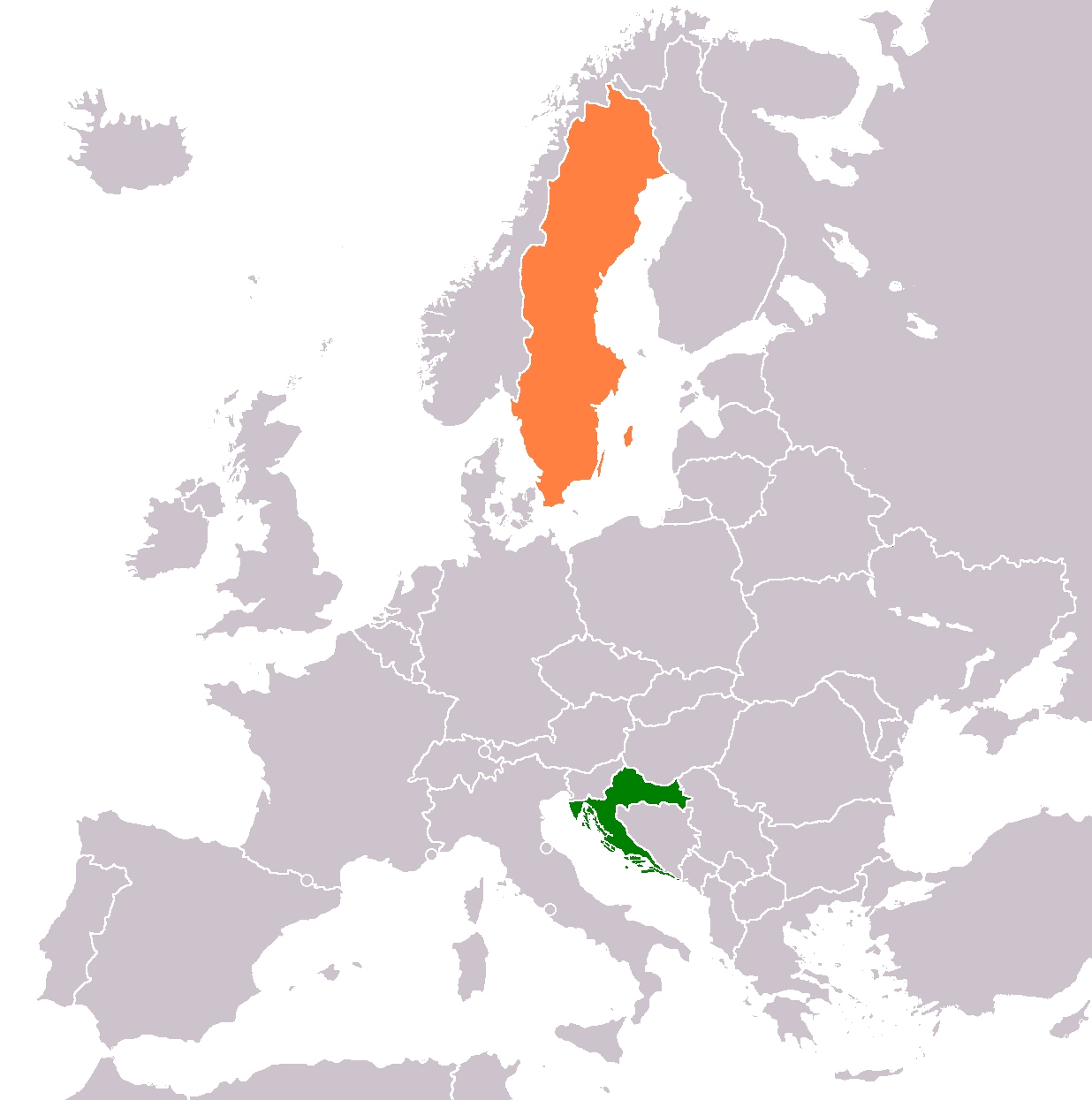

- Croatia: Sweden

Croatia and Sweden maintain foreign relations. Both countries established diplomatic relations on 29 January 1992. Croatia has an embassy in Stockholm. Sweden has an embassy in Zagreb. Both countries are members of the European Union, Council of Europe and NATO. Croatia fully supported Sweden's application to join NATO, which resulted in membership on 7 March 2024.

== History ==
Several terrorist acts carried out by Croatian separatists affiliated with the Ustaše movement were carried out in Sweden during the 1970s. On 10 February 1971, two Croatian men entered the Yugoslav Consulate in Gothenburg. They gathered and restrained all the consulate staff on the premises at knife and gunpoint. After just over one day's siege and fruitless negotiations with the Swedish police, they surrendered and were arrested. On 7 April 1971, at the Yugoslav Embassy in Stockholm, the Croats Miro Barešić and Anđelko Brajković stormed the building and killed ambassador Vladimir Rolović. On 15 September 1972, three Croatian men hijacked the Scandinavian Airlines System Flight 130 and held 86 passengers and 4 crew members hostage.

Sweden recognized Croatia on 16 January 1992, following its independence from the Socialist Federal Republic of Yugoslavia. On 23 January 1992, the Swedish government decided to establish diplomatic relations with Croatia. The agreement came into effect on 29 January 1992. Sweden opened an embassy in Zagreb on 9 March 1992.

Croatian president Zoran Milanović stated that his country should block ratification of Sweden's NATO accession until electoral reform measures are implemented in neighbouring Bosnia and Herzegovina, though the Foreign Minister expressed the government's support for any application. In July 2022, Croatia have fully ratified Sweden's NATO membership application.

== NATO ==
While Croatia became a member of NATO in 2009, Sweden has only initiated accession process in 2022. Croatian parliament voted nearly unanimously in support of Sweden's accession into the alliance.

== Resident diplomatic missions ==
- Croatia has an embassy in Stockholm.
- Sweden has an embassy in Zagreb.
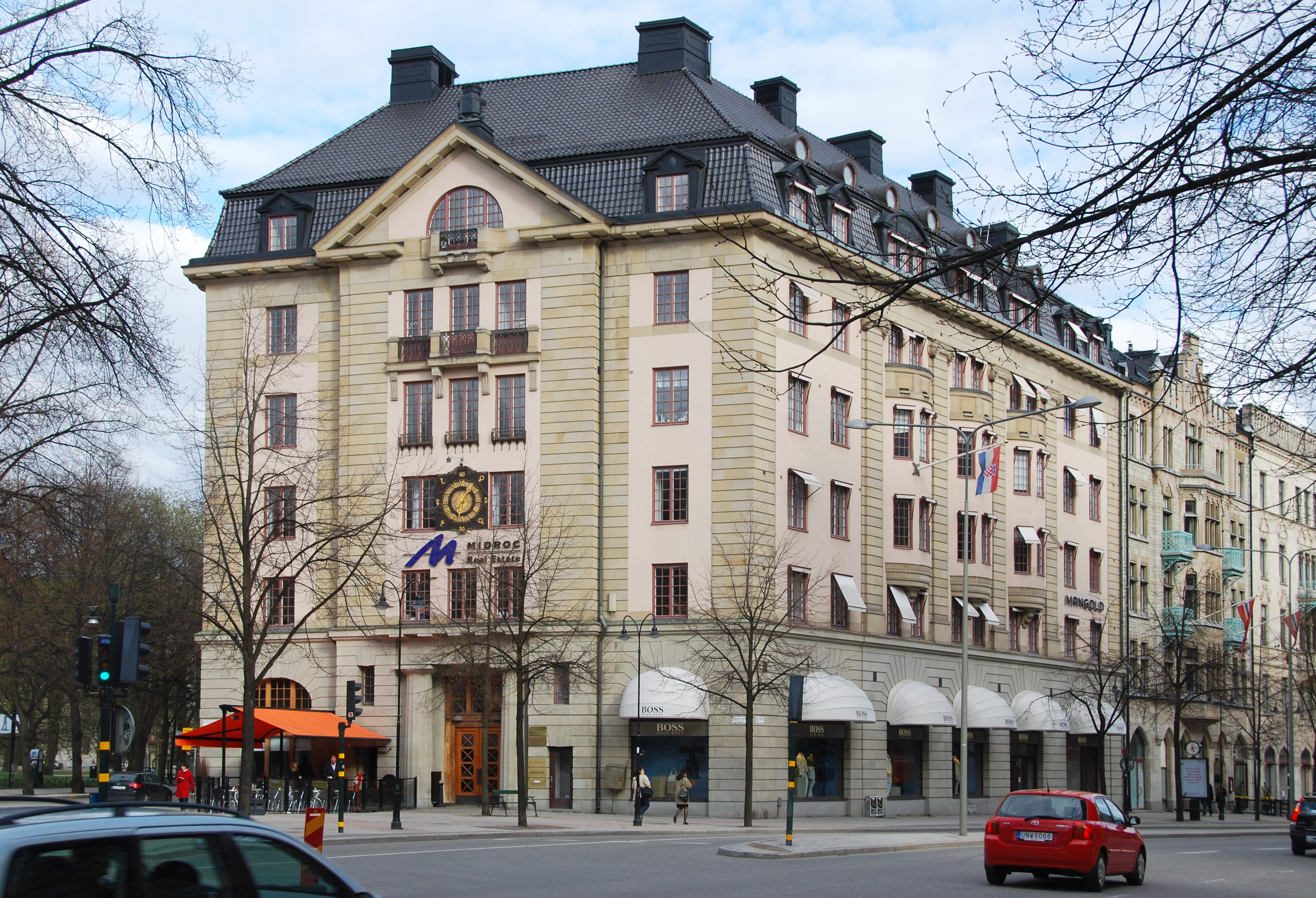
Embassy of Croatia in Stockholm

== See also ==
- Foreign relations of Croatia
- Foreign relations of Sweden
- Sweden–Yugoslavia relations
- Croats in Sweden
