= Krister Bringéus =

Swedish diplomat (born 1954)

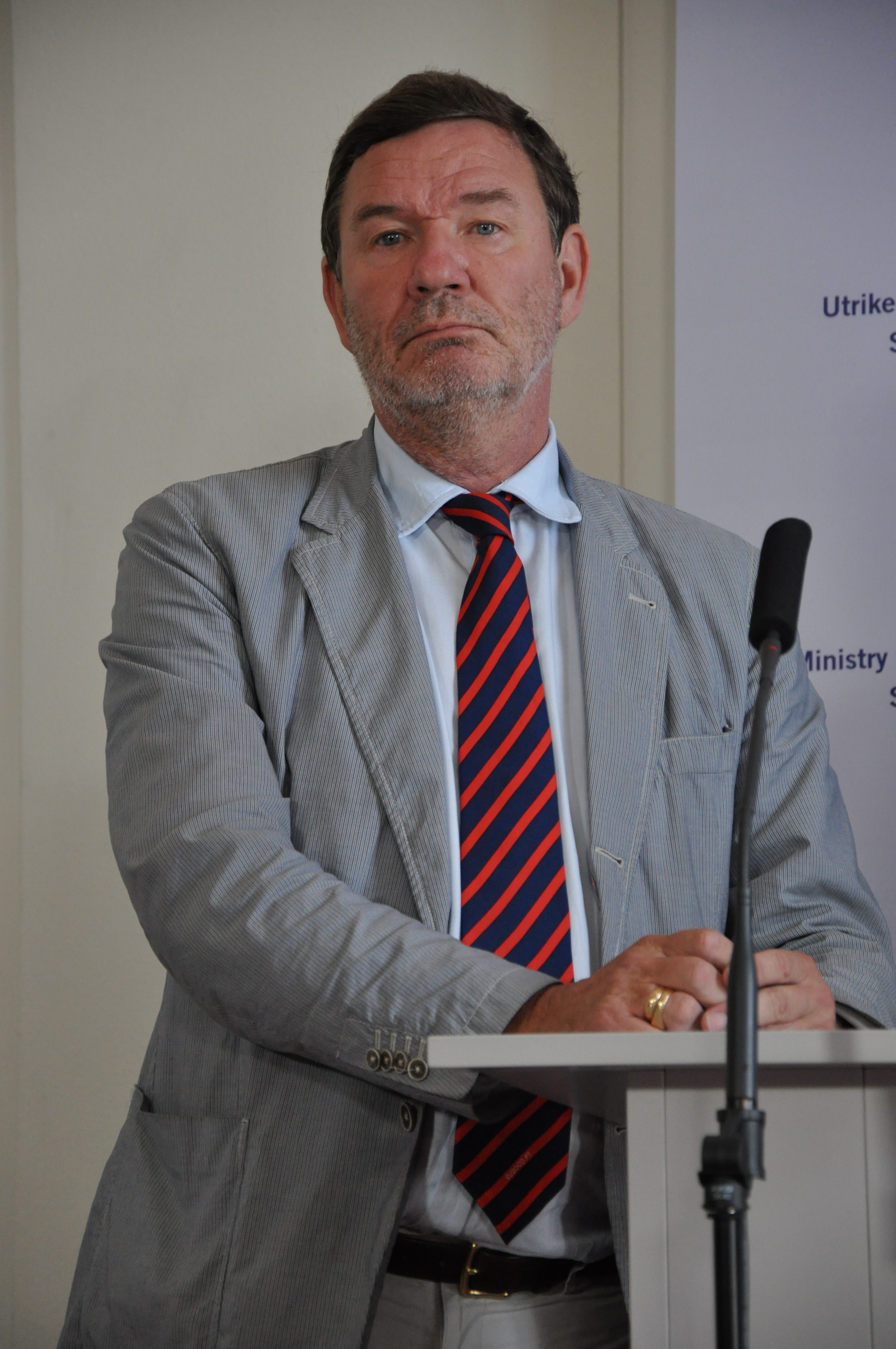
- Bringéus, 20 May 2010

Ambassador of Sweden to Norway
- In office November 2018 – 2020
- Preceded by: Axel Wernhoff
- Succeeded by: Cecilia Björner

Ambassador of Sweden to Serbia and Montenegro
- In office 2007–2010
- Preceded by: Lars-Göran Engfeldt
- Succeeded by: Christer Asp

Permanent Representative of Sweden to the OSCE
- In office 2002–2006
- Preceded by: Nils Daag
- Succeeded by: Veronika Bard Bringéus

Personal details
- Born: 7 September 1954 (age 71) Lund, Sweden
- Parent: Nils-Arvid Bringéus (father)
- Education: Université Paul Cézanne Aix-Marseille III; Stockholm University; Uppsala University

Nils Krister Bringéus (born 7 September 1954) is a Swedish diplomat. He served as a member of diplomatic staff and as Ambassador of Sweden to Serbia and to Norway from the 1970s and into the 2020s.

== Early life and postings ==
Bringéus was born on 7 September 1954 in Lund Cathedral Parish, Malmöhus County, Scania, Sweden. He is the son of ethnologist Nils-Arvid Bringéus and Doctor of Philosophy Gundis Bringéus (née Lindahl). Bringéus did his military service at the Interpreting School and studied at the Université Paul Cézanne Aix-Marseille III between 1973 and 1974, after which he graduated with a bachelor's degree in philosophy from Stockholm University in 1976 and a bachelor's degree in law from Uppsala University in 1979. He served at the Embassy of Sweden, Moscow from 1975 to 1976 and was chancellery secretary of the Foreign Ministry from 1979 to 1980. He was embassy secretary at the Embassy in Pyongyang from 1980 to 1981 and at the Embassy in London from 1981 to 1984, after which he was First Secretary at the Embassy in Moscow from 1984 to 1987. In 1987–1990, he was embassy secretary in the Personnel Department of the Ministry for Foreign Affairs, after which he was First Secretary at the Embassy in Bonn between 1990 and 1992 and Embassy Counselor at the Embassy in Washington between 1992 and 1997. He was Ministerial Adviser at the Department for European Security Policy in the Ministry for Foreign Affairs from 1997 to 2002, first as Deputy Head of department from 1997 to 1998 and then as Head of the department from 1998 to 2002.

== Senior roles and ambassadorships ==
In 2002 Bringéus was appointed Permanent Representative of Sweden to the OSCE in Vienna, holding the post until 2007. In 2007 he was appointed Ambassador of Sweden to Serbia, with dual accreditation to Montenegro. He held this role until 2010, which was followed with a posting that year as Senior Civilian Representative at Mazar-e Sharif with responsibility for the overall political leadership and Swedish civilian activities in the area, until 2011.

From 2011, Bringéus was an ambassador for Arctic issues at the Ministry for Foreign Affairs and from 2015 to 2016 was a special investigator of Sweden's defence and security policy collaborations. After being Ambassador for Nordic Affairs in the department for the European Union at the Ministry for Foreign Affairs from 2017 to 2018, Bringéus was ambassador to Norway from November 2018 until 2020.

== Personal life ==
Bringéus was, until 2012, married to Veronika Bard (formerly Veronika Bard-Bringéus), also a diplomat.

== Awards and decorations ==
- (Norway) Grand Cross of the Royal Norwegian Order of Merit (25 September 2020)

== Honours ==
- Member of the Royal Swedish Academy of War Sciences (2000)

Diplomatic posts
Preceded by Nils Daag	Permanent Representative of Sweden to the OSCE; 2002–2006	Succeeded by Veronika Bard Bringéus
Preceded by Lars-Göran Engfeldt	Ambassador of Sweden to Serbia; 2007–2010	Succeeded by Christer Asp
Preceded by Lars-Göran Engfeldt	Ambassador of Sweden to Montenegro; 2007–2010	Succeeded by Christer Asp
Preceded by Axel Wernhoff	Ambassador of Sweden to Norway; 2018–2020	Succeeded by Cecilia Björner
