= Canberra Commission on the Elimination of Nuclear Weapons =

1995–1996 Australian commission

The Canberra Commission on the Elimination of Nuclear Weapons was initiated by the prime minister of Australia the Honourable Paul Keating in November 1995 to deliberate on issues of nuclear proliferation and how to eliminate the world of nuclear weapons. The result of the commission was published as the Canberra Report in August 1996. The report was presented by Alexander Downer, Australia's Minister of Foreign Affairs, to the United Nations on 30 September 1996 and the Conference on Disarmament on 30 January 1997.

The commission was convened in the Australian Federal capital city of Canberra in the Australian Capital Territory. Subsequent meetings were held in Vienna and New York. The Commission consisted of a number of notable persons including Professor Joseph Rotblat, recipient of the 1995 Nobel Peace Prize; Michel Rocard, former prime minister of France; Robert McNamara, former United States Secretary of Defense and President of the World Bank Group; General George Butler, former Commander of the United States Strategic Air Command; Doctor Maj Britt Theorin, then President of the International Peace Bureau; Field Marshal Michael Carver, former Chief of the General Staff and Defence Staff; Professor Robert O'Neill, Chichele Professor of the History of War at Oxford University and former director of the International Institute for Strategic Studies; and Jacques-Yves Cousteau, oceanographer and environmentalist.

== Summary ==
Commission members came to the following conclusions:

1. Nuclear weapons are immensely destructive and any use would be a catastrophe.
2. If the peoples of the world fully understood the inherent dangers of nuclear weapons and the consequences of their use, they would reject then and not permit their continued possession by or acquisition of by governments, even for an alleged need for self-defense.
3. Nuclear weapons are owned by a handful of states that reserve uniquely to themselves the rights of ownership. This is highly discriminatory and a constant stimulus to non-owner states to acquire them, a situation that is highly unstable.
4. Despite the ownership of nuclear weapons, states have accepted stalemate or even defeat (Vietnam: USA; Afghanistan: Soviet Union; French Indo-china: France). Nuclear weapons are militarily irrelevant.
5. If no states had nuclear weapons, no states would seek them.
6. Transitioning to a status of a nuclear-free world is dependent upon mutual verification.
7. Before states will agree to eliminate their weapons, they will require a high level of confidence that the verification arrangements would detect promptly any attempt to cheat the disarmament process.
8. A political judgement will be needed on whether the assurances possible from verification are sufficient.
9. All existing arms control agreements have required political judgments of this nature because no verification system provides absolute certainty.
10. Cheaters, states or non-state entities, would be dealt with by conventional means of prevention because the peoples of the world would rise up against them.
