= Croats in Sweden =

Total population
- 28,000-40,000

Languages
- Swedish, Croatian

Religion
- Catholic Church

Related ethnic groups
- Croats

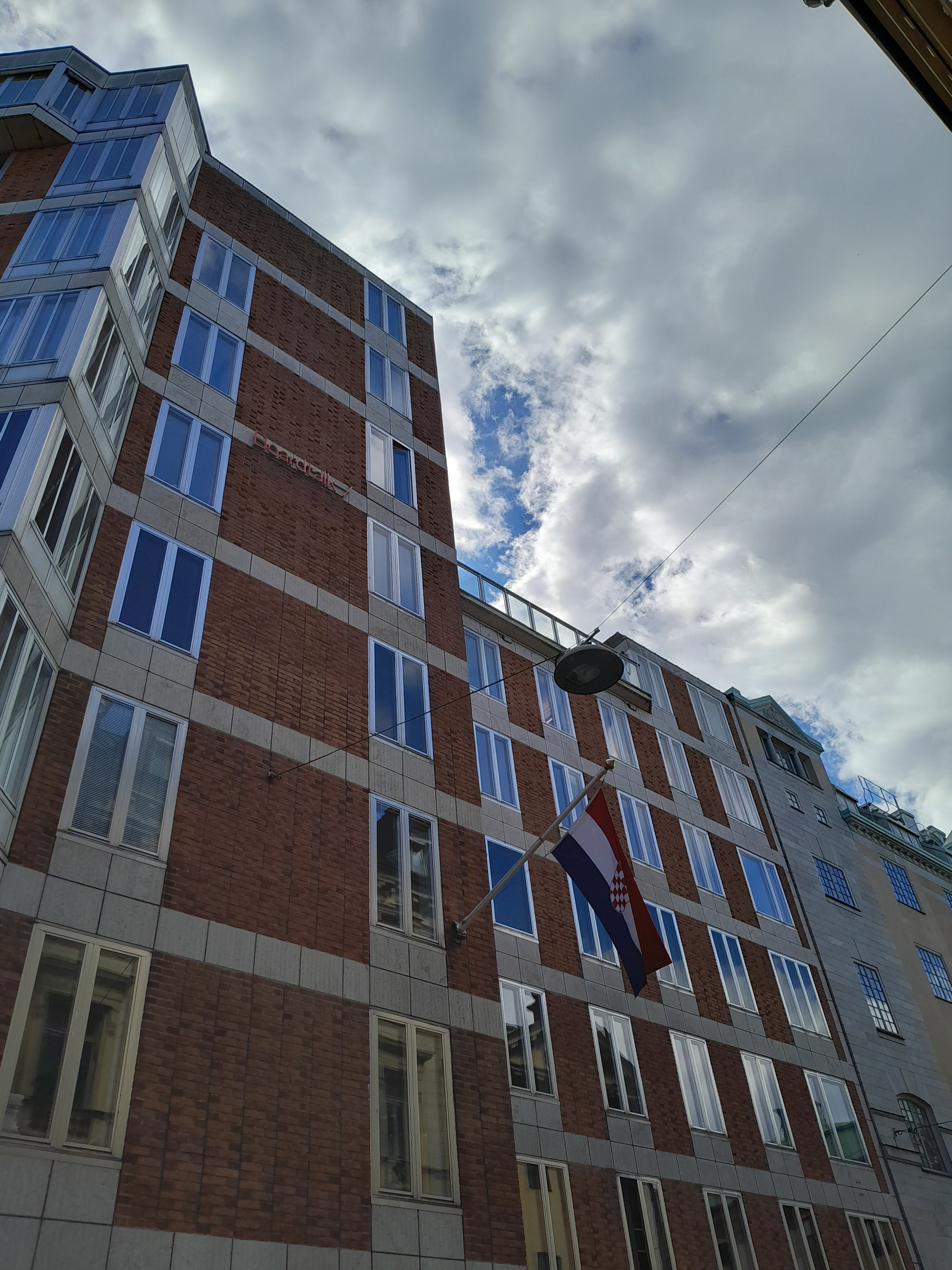
Croatian embassy in Stockholm

Croats in Sweden (Swedish: Sverigekroater; Croatian: Hrvati u Švedskoj) are citizens and residents of Sweden of Croatian descent. As of 2017, they number approximately 28,000 individuals. Croats mostly follow Catholicism, but a small minority that have been living in Sweden for generations have converted to Evangelicalism. They mostly live in Stockholm, the capital city, and in Malmö, in Rosengård district. The most successful football club of Croats of Sweden is NK Croatia Malmö, that played in 1988 the Swedish 2nd League, declared in 1989 with title "Best Immigrant Club of Europe", winner of Malmö Mästerskap four times (1988, 1989, 1991 and 2016).

== History ==
First organised arrivals of groups of Croat guest workers from SFR Yugoslavia for Swedish automotive industry started in mid 1960s. The second major wave happened during the Croatian War of Independence and Bosnian War in early 1990s when numerous refugees from the region moved to Sweden.

== Notable people ==
- Zlatan Ibrahimović, Swedish footballer born in Sweden to a Bosniak father and a Croat mother
- Damir Markota, Croatian basketball player who grew up in Sweden
- Dennis Bozic, Swedish ice hockey player
- Slavenka Drakulić, Croatian novelist who lives in Sweden
- Ivana Gagula, Croatian born Swedish model
- Branimir Hrgota, Swedish footballer
- Christer Lipovac, Swedish footballer
- Teddy Lučić, former Swedish footballer born to a Croatian father and a Finnish mother
- Peter Popovic, former Swedish ice hockey player
- Rade Prica, Swedish footballer
- Mattia Prskalo, Swedish model
- Robin Simović, Swedish footballer
- Teresa Utković, Swedish handball player
- Ivo Vazgeč, Swedish footballer
- Darijan Bojanić, Swedish fotballer

== See also ==
- Croatia–Sweden relations
- Croats
- Croatian diaspora
- List of Croats
- Immigration to Sweden
