= Sweden–Yugoslavia relations =

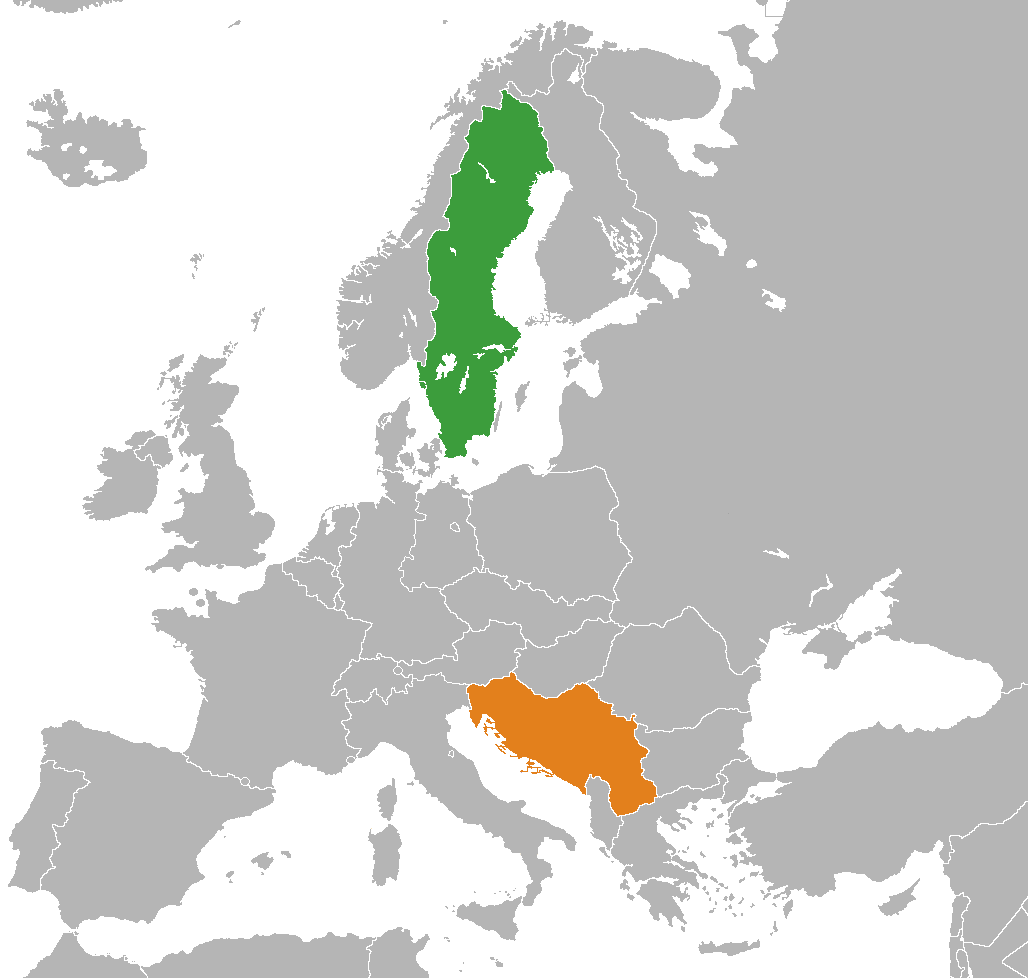

- Sweden: Yugoslavia

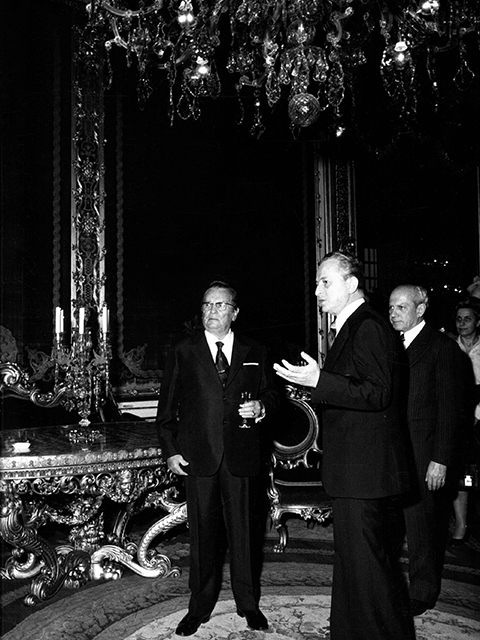
President of Yugoslavia Josip Broz Tito at the Stockholm Palace in 1976

Sweden–Yugoslavia relations (Swedish: Relationerna mellan Sverige och Jugoslavien; Serbo-Croatian: Odnosi Švedske i Jugoslavije, Односи Шведске и Југославије; Slovene: Odnosi med Švedsko in Jugoslavijo; Macedonian: Односите Шведска-Југославија) were historical foreign relations between Sweden and now split-up Yugoslavia (both Kingdom of Yugoslavia or Socialist Federal Republic of Yugoslavia). During the Cold War both Sweden and Yugoslavia refused to formally join either NATO or the Warsaw Pact military alliance. Both countries nevertheless had developed relations with NATO. Sweden preferred formal military neutrality in order to strengthen the neutrality claim of Finland, while post-1948 Tito–Stalin split Yugoslavia indirectly associated itself with NATO via the Balkan Pact during the Informbiro period.

With other neutral and non-aligned countries in Europe Yugoslavia and Sweden perceived development of relations among diverse European states as a way to ease Cold War tensions and promote Détente, especially via CSCE.

Sweden played prominent role in international and European response to the Yugoslav crisis, Yugoslav Wars and the immediate subsequent period. Carl Bildt served as EU Special Envoy to the Former Yugoslavia, High Representative for Bosnia and Herzegovina, UN Special Envoy to the Balkans. Judge Krister Thelin served as ad litem at the International Criminal Tribunal for the former Yugoslavia. Over 100,000 refugees from war in Yugoslavia made Sweden their new home many of which are held up as an example of successful integration.

== See also ==
- Foreign relations of Sweden
- Foreign relations of Yugoslavia
- Croatia–Sweden relations
- Serbia–Sweden relations
  - Views on Enlargement of NATO in Serbia and Sweden
- 1971 Yugoslav Embassy shooting
- Yugoslavia–European Communities relations
- Neutral and Non-Aligned European States
- Group of Nine
- Sweden at the 1984 Winter Olympics
- Yugoslavia in the Eurovision Song Contest 1975
- Sweden in the Eurovision Song Contest 1990
- Yugoslavia in the Eurovision Song Contest 1992
- Swedish Serbs
- Croats in Sweden
- Jasenko Selimović
- Aida Hadžialić
