= Serbia–Sweden relations =

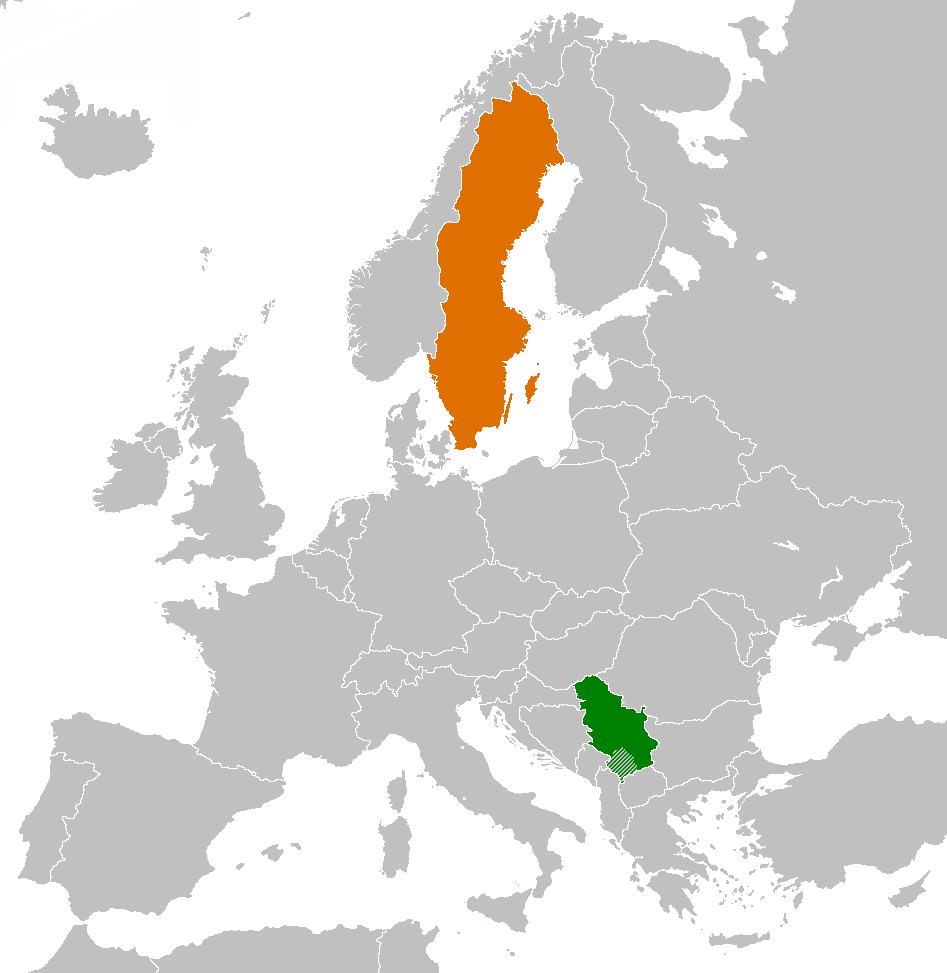
- Serbia: Sweden

Serbia and Sweden maintain diplomatic relations established in 1917. From 1918 to 2006, Sweden maintained relations with the Kingdom of Yugoslavia, the Socialist Federal Republic of Yugoslavia (SFRY), and the Federal Republic of Yugoslavia (FRY) (later Serbia and Montenegro), of which Serbia is considered shared (SFRY) or sole (FRY) legal successor.

== Economic relations ==
Trade between two countries amounted to $749 million in 2023; Serbia's merchandise export to Sweden were about $460 million; Swedish exports were standing at roughly $289 million.

Swedish companies present in Serbia include Tetra Pak (food packaging and processing plant in Gornji Milanovac), Trelleborg (non-tire rubber producing factory in Ruma). In retail sector there are IKEA (with store on the outskirts of Belgrade) and H&M (as one of the biggest fashion retailers in the country).

== Immigration from Serbia ==
There are around 80,000 people of Serbian descent living in Sweden. They are mainly concentrated in Malmö, Stockholm, and Gothenburg.

== Resident diplomatic missions ==
- Serbia has an embassy in Stockholm.
- Sweden has an embassy in Belgrade.
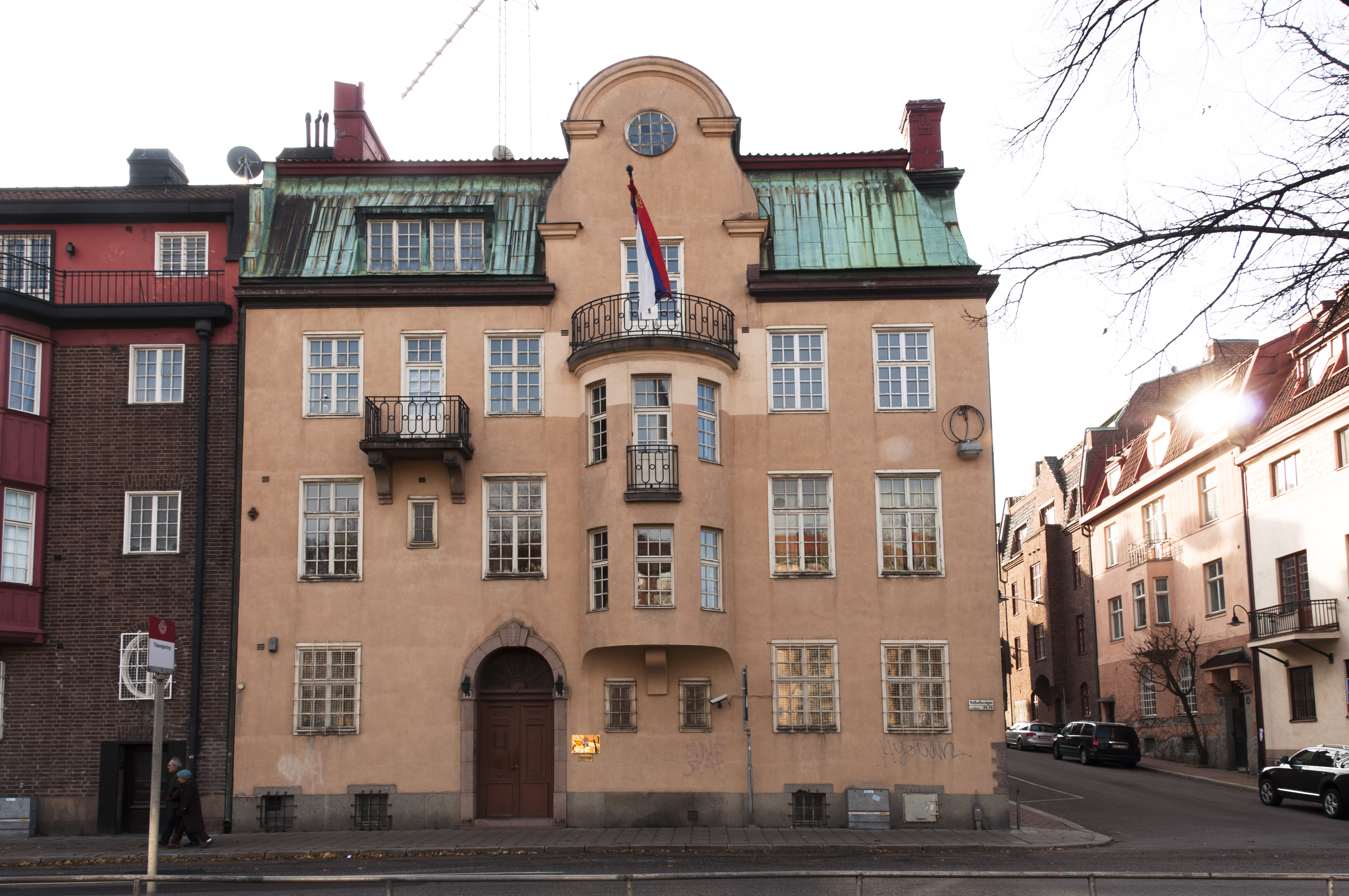
Embassy of Serbia in Stockholm

== See also ==
- Foreign relations of Serbia
- Foreign relations of Sweden
- Sweden–Yugoslavia relations
