= Embassy of Sweden, Beijing =

Diplomatic mission of Sweden in China

- Location: Beijing
- Address: 3, Dongzhimenwai Dajie; Sanlitun, Chaoyang District; Beijing 100600; China
- Coordinates: 39.940885°N 116.453095°E
- Opened: 1937
- Ambassador: Per Augustsson
- Jurisdiction: China; Mongolia
- Website: Official website

The Embassy of Sweden in Beijing is Sweden's diplomatic mission in China. The embassy's task is to represent Sweden, the Swedish government in China and to promote Swedish interests. Trade promotion and development cooperation are other tasks for the embassy, as well as press and culture issues and migration and consular services. The embassy's sphere of responsibility includes Mongolia. The ambassador has a dual accreditation to Ulaanbaatar.

== History ==
Sweden's diplomatic representation in China dates back to the consulate general established in Shanghai in 1863. Sweden established its first legation in the Far East in 1906 when it opened in Tokyo, Japan. The envoy there had a dual accreditation to Beijing starting from 1907. Sweden's first envoy to China was the minister in Tokyo, Gustaf Wallenberg. In April 1907, Wallenberg was in Beijing to have the Treaty of Canton (1847) between Sweden–Norway and China amended and to establish diplomatic relations between Sweden and China.

During the 1920s and 1930s, legation counselors from the Swedish legation in Tokyo where based in Beijing and served as chargés d'affaires ad interim. From 1933, the holder of the consul general position also served as the chargé d'affaires ad interim in the Republic of China.

The Committee of Supply report issued in March 1937 stated that the leadership of Sweden's diplomatic representation in China had been exercised by the minister stationed in Tokyo. In the minister's absence, the consul general in Shanghai served as chargé d'affaires ad interim. However, the minister for foreign affairs considered this provisional arrangement unsuitable given recent developments. Both the Swedish National Board of Trade and industry organizations supported the establishment of an independent diplomatic mission in China. It was therefore proposed that a new legation be created in China starting the next fiscal year, by upgrading the Consulate General in Shanghai to a full ministerial post (envoy). This would maintain the existing base salary (grade A2) but increase the local allowance from SEK 17,400 to SEK 30,000, matching that of the envoy in Tokyo. Office cost reimbursements would be eliminated as the post transitioned to a legation. Initially, the new envoy would remain in Shanghai but could be relocated to Nanjing if deemed appropriate. It was also proposed that the envoy to China be accredited to Siam (Thailand), a responsibility then held by the envoy in Tokyo.

Johan Beck-Friis became Sweden's first envoy to China from 1 July 1937. After Beck-Friis left China in 1939, Sweden had no diplomatic relations with the Chinese nationalist government for several years. In December 1943, Sven Allard was appointed as Sweden's first diplomat in the free China's capital, Chongqing. Only a consular representation remained in Shanghai. The mission was based in Chongqing from 1944 to 1945 before relocating to Nanjing in 1946. Between 1947 and 1948, the mission was located in Shanghai. In 1947–1948, the Swedish ambassador was also accredited in Manila and Bangkok.

In May 1950, Sweden and the People's Republic of China established diplomatic relations. Sweden was the first Western country to establish relations with the newly established People's Republic. Chairman Mao Zedong decided to personally receive the Swedish ambassador, Torsten Hammarström, when presenting his letter of credentials on 13 June 1950, which was unusual and a sign that China attached great importance to this diplomatic breakthrough.

In September 1950, it was reported that the embassy had difficulty resolving its office and housing problems satisfactorily and had now rented a house that accommodated both the chancery and embassy residence for Ambassador Hammarström. From 1951, the mission and its chancery were located in Beijing, but a consulate/mission chancery still existed in Shanghai.

On 9 November 1970, the National Swedish Board of Public Building (Byggnadsstyrelsen) submitted a proposal to the Swedish government that Sweden should build its own embassy in Beijing. The new embassy would cost seven million Swedish krona, and it was expected to be completed by mid-1972. Ambassador Arne Björnberg and the rest of the embassy staff were then housed in a rented building. It was becoming worn out, and a new embassy had been considered for a couple of years. The new embassy would include offices and housing for embassy personnel. It was designed by Swedish architects and, according to an agreement with the Swedish government, construction began with Chinese workers in January 1971.

The embassy, like the rest of Beijing, was shaken by China's deadliest earthquake in history in July 1976. Embassy counsellor Åke Berg and other Swedish embassy officials, like 6 million people in the city, took to the streets and lived in tents, as aftershocks occurred several times a day for at least a week, posing a risk of collapse.

== Staff and tasks ==
=== Staff ===
Approximately 60 people work at the Swedish Embassy in Beijing. The organization is divided into five teams:

- Ambassador's Office
- Peace and Security Team: Focuses on monitoring, analysis, and reporting on China's domestic and foreign policy, security issues, and human rights.
- Migration Team: Handles visa matters and issues related to residence and work permits.
- Transition, Growth, and Trade Team: Manages economic and trade policy, promotes business, and reports on green industries, sustainable business practices, research, innovation, and higher education.
- Sweden Promotion and Culture Team: Handles public diplomacy, press, communication, and cultural cooperation.
- Operations Support and Consular Affairs Team: Provides consular services and manages the embassy's administrative and property issues.

=== Tasks ===
The Embassy of Sweden in Beijing has approximately 60 staff organized into five teams: Team Peace and Security, Team Migration, Team Transition, Team Growth and Trade, and Team Sweden Promotion and Culture, and Team Operations and Consular Affairs. Sweden has an extensive and growing exchange with China in various areas and engages in intense political dialogue on international issues and human rights. The embassy is also involved in trade promotion, development cooperation, press, culture, information matters, as well as consular and migration services. The embassy's scope of operations also includes Mongolia, where the ambassador is accredited in Ulaanbaatar.

== Buildings ==
=== Republic of China (1907–1949) ===
The Swedish envoy in Tokyo had a dual accreditation to Beijing. From at least 1914 until 1921, when the envoy was in Beijing, he resided at the Grand Hôtel des Wagons-Lits in the Peking Legation Quarter. The legation counselors accredited to Beijing from the legation in Tokyo were based at 23 Shih Kia Hutung from 1923 to 1924, then at Legation Street in the Peking Legation Quarter from 1925 to 1926, then at 16 San T'iao Huting from 1927 to 1930, and finally at 44 Fang Chin Hsiang, E. C. from 1931 to 1932.

From 1933, the holder of the consul general position in Shanghai also served the chargé d'affaires ad interim in China which meant that the chancery was colocated with the Swedish Consulate General in Shanghai. The chancery was located at 96 Rue Marcel Tillot from 1933 to 1934 and at 169 Yuen Ming Yuen Road from 1935 to 1939. In August 1937, as preparatory measures in the event of evacuation of Swedes in Shanghai becoming necessary, Ekman Foreign Agency was appointed as the assembly point. Its premises were located in Hamilton House in the Shanghai International Settlement, where the Swedish legation had also temporarily relocated. In 1940, it moved to 9 Quai de France in the Shanghai French Concession, where it remained until 1943. The chancery was then based in Chongqing from 1944 to 1945 before relocating to Nanjing in 1946. Between 1947 and 1948, it was located at 9 Nan-Whangputan, Shanghai. By 1949, it had moved to 9 Chung Shan Lu, Eastern (II), Shanghai 13.

=== People's Republic of China (1950–present) ===
In 1950, the chancery moved to Cathay Mansions, Shanghai 13. In 1951, the embassy was relocated to Beijing. An embassy mission chancery remained in Shanghai, located at 9 Chung Shan Lu (E 2), Shanghai 13 from 1951 to 1955. The chancery was situated at 8 D, Nan Ho Yen, Beijing, from 1951 to 1952, at 17, Ma Chiao Miao, Beijing, from 1953 to 1967 and at 22, Sanlitun, Beijing, from 1968 to 1975. (Note: Until 1971, the address was 22 Sanlitun, Beijing, and from 1972 to 1975, the address was only specified as Sanlitun, Beijing.)

The residence was located at 8 E, Nan Ho Yen, Beijing, from 1951 to 1964, and from 1965 to 1968, it was at 8E, Dong'Anmen Nanjie. Since 1976, the chancery and residence have been located at 3 Dongzhimenwai Dajie in Sanlitun in the Chaoyang District.

==== Current embassy buildings ====
The Embassy of Sweden has been located on a plot in Sanlitun, diplomatic area number 2 in the northeastern part of Beijing, since the 1970s. Nearby properties include chanceries and residences, and in the vicinity, there are a large number of hotels and new office buildings. Sweden is one of the countries, along with Norway, Denmark, and a few others, that owns its properties. The remaining embassies lease their facilities from the Diplomatic Service Bureau (DSB).

The construction of the Swedish embassy buildings took place between September 1971 and October 1972. The architects were Nils Ahrbom and Hando Kask. In 1998, the conference hall Hedinsalen was built, along with a smaller residential building with two small apartments; the architect for these additions was Mats Egelius. In 2003, there was a renovation and expansion of the visa office according to the drawings by architect Gunnar Åsell, but it has since been demolished. In 2011, the National Property Board of Sweden (SFV) made another addition for the visa office, with Ahrbom Arkitekter as the architect. In 2013, former guest rooms and guest apartments were combined into an office for the Center for Environmental Technology (Centec).

The property includes the embassy, the ambassador's residence, staff accommodations, garages, and service buildings. The buildings consist of two-story brick structures with basements. The roofs are covered with stone tiles. The property features a green and lush garden with a pool and garage. The houses are equipped with mechanical supply and exhaust air ventilation, with heating and cooling options.

== See also ==
- China–Sweden relations
- Consulate General of Sweden, Hong Kong
- Consulate General of Sweden, Shanghai
