= Consulate General of Sweden, Shanghai =

Consular representation of the Kingdom of Sweden in China

- Location: Shanghai
- Address: 1521-1541 Central Plaza; 381 Huaihai Road (Middle); Shanghai 200020; China
- Coordinates: 31.22187°N 121.47288°E
- Opened: September 1996 (Note: The Consulate General traces its origins to the one originally established on 8 May 1863. It later became a salaried consulate general and was eventually incorporated into the Swedish legation/embassy, becoming a consular chancery that was closed in 1956. The current Consulate General was opened in September 1996.)
- Inaugurated: 6 November 1996
- Jurisdiction: Shanghai, Jiangsu, Anhui, Zhejiang
- Consul General: Annika Hahn-Englund
- Website: Official website

The Consulate General of Sweden is the diplomatic mission of Sweden in Shanghai. It is located in Huangpu district of Shanghai. The Swedish Consulate General in Shanghai today represents Sweden in East China, with its consular district covering the city of Shanghai and the provinces of Jiangsu, Anhui, and Zhejiang. Officially reopened in September 1996, it reflects Sweden's strategic interest in engaging with one of China's fastest-growing regions. Historically, Sweden has maintained a presence in Shanghai since the 19th century, when the original consulate was established in 1863 during the Sweden–Norway union. The early consular mission focused on supporting trade and shipping, operating within the frameworks of European imperial influence in China. However, due to limited resources and internal conflicts, the consulate struggled to fully leverage East Asia's economic opportunities and was eventually closed in 1956 after a long period of transition.

Today, the consulate employs 17 staff, including diplomats from the Ministry for Foreign Affairs and personnel from the Swedish Migration Agency. Its responsibilities include promoting Swedish foreign policy and increasing awareness of Sweden, particularly in areas such as trade, culture, and education. A dedicated promotion team leads this effort. The consulate also handles civil law and consular services, such as passport issuance, and manages administrative matters like protocol, security, and property. In addition, a major function is migration services, where a seven-person team processes visas, work permits, and residency applications.

== History ==
=== 1863–1920 ===
During the Age of Empire (1800–1914), smaller European nations like Sweden–Norway, unable to compete militarily with larger powers, sought influence through economic means, particularly by expanding their global consular networks. By the late 19th century, Sweden–Norway had developed an extensive network of consulates, including in important cities like Shanghai. Following Britain's victory in the First Opium War and the 1847 Treaty of Canton, Sweden–Norway secured extraterritorial rights and trade access to Chinese treaty ports, including Shanghai, under most favoured nation status. This allowed them to benefit from "legal imperialism" without the costs associated with direct colonial rule. In China, Swedish-Norwegian consuls operated within frameworks set by major imperial powers, focusing on trade and shipping. Initially, the consular position in China was unpaid but regarded as important for future prospects, especially if new ports opened. Despite a decline in Swedish-Norwegian shipping to East Asia in the late 19th century, the consulate remained active, particularly in Shanghai, though challenges related to trade volumes and finding qualified consuls persisted.

Early Swedish-Norwegian representation in China was closely linked to American trading firms like Russell & Company, with figures such as Paul S. Forbes and later Francis Blackwell Forbes serving in key consular roles. This relationship reflected Sweden–Norway's strategy of leveraging existing imperial networks to secure economic advantages with minimal investment. By the late 19th century, Sweden–Norway expanded its global presence through consular services, aiming for both political prestige and economic opportunities. In Shanghai, as elsewhere, Swedish-Norwegian consuls were often foreign nationals integrated into colonial networks, rather than professional diplomats. While some successes were achieved in establishing a political and social presence, the consular service struggled to effectively support Swedish and Norwegian trade due to a lack of economic expertise among consuls. Reforms, including stipend programs like the Johnson stipends (Johnsonska stipendierna), aimed to train better-qualified candidates. The Consulate General for China moved from Canton to Shanghai on 8 May 1863.

After the Forbes family's departure from Shanghai in 1883, Oscar Lagerheim, a Swedish resident with close ties to Sweden's foreign ministry, was appointed consul general in 1884. His appointment, in response to growing regional tensions such as the Sino-French War, marked a shift toward prioritizing Swedish and Norwegian nationals in key positions. This was seen as essential for better aligning consular activities with national interests during an era of increasing European competition in Asia. Throughout the late 19th century, the Swedish-Norwegian consulate in Shanghai underwent several transitions. The American influence ended in 1883 when the last Forbes family member left, leading to instability in the consulate. Austrian diplomat Josef von Haas briefly held the position of consul general before Lagerheim's appointment in 1884, following von Haas's reassignment to Korea. Despite proposals for a more robust consular presence, such as a shared consulate for all of East Asia, the Swedish-Norwegian governments were hesitant to make major investments in the region, citing financial concerns. This hesitance reflected broader challenges in the consular system, which struggled to balance diplomatic priorities with limited resources. The consulate in Shanghai remained under leaders like von Haas and Lagerheim, and by 1893, Carl Bock succeeded von Haas. Bock, known for his explorations in East Asia, criticized the consulate's previous leadership and advocated for reforms, including higher salaries and more authority for the consul general.

Despite these efforts, the Swedish-Norwegian consular service in Shanghai ultimately failed to fully capitalize on East Asia's economic potential. Internal conflicts and a lack of commitment to a broader diplomatic strategy hindered its effectiveness. Carl Bock, the Swedish-Norwegian consul in Shanghai during the late 19th century, played a key role in enhancing commercial ties between Sweden–Norway and China. His responsibilities included supporting shipping and assisting Swedish and Norwegian citizens, missionaries, and seafarers in the region. In 1896, Bock requested a salary increase due to the demanding nature of his role, though his request was only partially granted. Over time, debates over the consulate's jurisdiction and Bock's position led to long-term disputes, ultimately resulting in his replacement by Carl Filip Alexander Hagberg in 1897. Sweden–Norway also sought to establish relations with Japan, a country they had initially shown little interest in. However, as Japan gained importance among European powers, Sweden–Norway worked to align with Japan to maintain favorable trade relations. The complex negotiations involved balancing national interests with European unity in dealings with Japan.

The inefficiency and conflict within the consular system eventually led to Bock's discharge in 1902. Hagberg then took over as the final consul of Sweden–Norway in Shanghai, shortly before the dissolution of the union between Sweden and Norway in 1905. At the end of the 19th century, the Swedish-Norwegian consular service in East Asia faced increasing demands. Diplomat Ove Gude was tasked with exploring how to structure Swedish-Norwegian representation in China and Japan. His report recommended consular posts in key cities like Kobe, Nagasaki, Shanghai, and Hong Kong, aiming to support Swedish and Norwegian exporters facing competition from larger European powers. Despite these recommendations, the Norwegian government largely rejected the expansion plans, citing financial concerns.

In Shanghai, the consulate's role expanded as Swedish and Norwegian shipping interests grew, but challenges remained due to the reliance on foreign merchant consuls instead of professional diplomats. The consular jurisdiction continued to evolve, reflecting changing trade dynamics, such as the downgrading of the Hong Kong consulate and the expansion of the Singapore's consular district. By decision on 22 May 1896, the consulate of the Victoria district (Hong Kong) was placed under the Consulate General in Shanghai. After the dissolution of the Swedish-Norwegian union in 1905, Sweden recognized the strategic importance of East Asia, particularly China and Japan. Shanghai became a key diplomatic hub, and the Swedish consulate there gained prominence with the appointment of highly educated diplomats like Johan Hultman, who focused on protecting commercial interests and negotiating agreements on industrial property rights with other European powers.

=== 1920–1956 ===
The Consulate General in Shanghai was a salaried post and considered essential during repeated reorganizations of Sweden's foreign service over the previous quarter-century. Since the 1926–1927 fiscal year, it was also staffed with a paid vice-consul. The consul general, or the vice-consul in his absence, also served as a consular judge. The consul general in Shanghai was responsible for representing Swedish interests across all of China, particularly in commercial matters. His duties included monitoring China's economic developments and supporting Swedish business interests. A 1923 proposal even suggested that Sweden's interests in China could be managed entirely by the Shanghai consulate, with assistance from the minister in Tokyo, highlighting the central role of the Shanghai post. However, the distance between Shanghai and northern China limited the consul general's ability to support Swedish citizens, particularly missionaries, in those regions. For this reason, it was later proposed that the northern consular responsibilities be transferred to the legation in Beijing rather than remain under the Shanghai consulate.

From 1933, the holder of the consul general position also served as the chargé d'affaires ad interim in the Republic of China.

The Committee of Supply report issued in March 1937 stated that the leadership of Sweden's diplomatic representation in China had been exercised by the minister stationed in Tokyo. In the minister's absence, the consul general in Shanghai served as chargé d'affaires ad interim. However, the minister for foreign affairs considered this provisional arrangement unsuitable given recent developments. Both the Swedish National Board of Trade and industry organizations supported the establishment of an independent diplomatic mission in China. It was therefore proposed that a new legation be created in China starting the next fiscal year, by upgrading the Consulate General in Shanghai to a full ministerial post (envoy). This would maintain the existing base salary (grade A2) but increase the local allowance from SEK 17,400 to SEK 30,000, matching that of the envoy in Tokyo. Office cost reimbursements would be eliminated as the post transitioned to a legation. Initially, the new envoy would remain in Shanghai but could be relocated to Nanjing if deemed appropriate. It was also proposed that the envoy to China be accredited to Siam (Thailand), a responsibility then held by the envoy in Tokyo. Due to difficult climate conditions and based on experience, Shanghai had been granted a more favorable policy for travel allowances, allowing biennial home leave support. Furthermore, existing restrictions on home travel for chancery staff, which were based on outdated assumptions, were recommended to be lifted to ensure equal treatment with other overseas personnel.

On 13 August 1937, the Battle of Shanghai began. At that time, the Swedish colony in Shanghai consisted of around 80 people, mainly businessmen and engineers. On 8 November 1937, during the battle, the residence of the consul general (who had held the rank of envoy for the past four months) on Hungjao Road (Note: Also spelled Hungiao Road.)—located outside the international defense zone—was damaged by Japanese bombing. By then, however, the envoy had already moved a couple of months earlier to a temporary residence on Great Western Road, within the international concession. A few days later, it was reported that the Swedish minister, Johan Beck-Friis, had visited the residence, which had been looted by Japanese soldiers. The soldiers were caught red-handed carrying whiskey bottles from the wine cellar and drinking the minister's rum while amusing themselves by flipping through stolen books from the library. His diplomatic uniforms had been stolen, all cabinets forced open and emptied, letters scattered, and the furnishings smashed to pieces. It was reported that the minister himself wrested whiskey bottles from the hands of threatening Japanese soldiers. The Swedish legation sent a formal protest to the Japanese army on 9 November, the day after the bombing. On 23 November, it was reported that Japanese forces had entered the residence on Hungjao Road for the fifth time, breaking windows and seizing various items, despite Minister Beck-Friis's protests to the Japanese authorities.

At the end of the 1930s, the consulate general had been transformed into a chancery affiliated with the Swedish legation. The remaining chancery was closed in December 1956.

=== 1996–present ===
On 3 July 1996, an agreement was signed in Beijing for Sweden to establish a Consulate General in the city of Shanghai. The consular district would include the city of Shanghai as well as the provinces of Jiangsu, Anhui, and Zhejiang. The Consulate General opened in September of the same year. The Swedish Trade Council described it as a strategic investment in the region expected to experience the highest economic growth during the 1990s. The consulate was located next to the Swedish Trade Council's office in Shanghai. It was officially inaugurated by Prime Minister Göran Persson on 6 November 1996.

== Staff and tasks ==
=== Staff ===
17 people work at the Consulate General, including three posted by the Ministry for Foreign Affairs and two from the Swedish Migration Agency.

=== Tasks ===
The Consulate General represents Sweden and Swedish foreign policy, and promotes Swedish interests in Shanghai and the provinces of Anhui, Jiangsu, and Zhejiang. A key task is to increase awareness of Sweden, strengthen Sweden's image among target audiences in Shanghai, and promote cooperation and long-term relationships between Sweden and eastern China—particularly in the areas of trade, culture, and education. The Consulate General's promotion team consists of four staff members and is led by the consul responsible for promotion.

The Consulate General also provides consular and civil law services, including issuing Swedish passports and ID cards to Swedish citizens. The administrative staff are responsible for protocol matters, archiving, accounting, and property and security management. The consular and administrative team includes five staff members and is led by the consul for administration and consular affairs.

The Consulate General also has a significant migration section, which handles visa applications as well as residence and work permits in cooperation with the Swedish Migration Agency. The migration team consists of seven staff members and is led by the consul responsible for migration.

== Location ==
=== Chancery ===
The Consulate General was located at 5 Weihaiwei Road from at least 1915 to 1919. From 1920 to 1930, it was situated at 75 Avenue Dubail, and in 1931 at 179 Avenue Dubail. The street has since been renamed. (Note: Dubail Avenue was called Chungking Road (Southern) under the Nationalist government and later Ch'ung Ch'ing, Nan under the Communist government.) Between 1932 and 1934, the Consulate General was located at 96 Rue Marcel Tillot. (Note: Rue Marcel Tillot was called Hingan Road under the Nationalist government and later Hsing An under the Communist government.) From 1935 to 1939, it was based at 169 Yuen Ming Yuen Road. (Note: Yuenmingyuen or Yuen Ming Yuen was called Yuanmingyuan Road under the Nationalist government and later Yuan Ming Yuan under the Communist government.) In 1939, after being converted into a chancery under the legation, it moved to 9 Quai de France in the Shanghai French Concession, where it remained until 1944.

In 1947, the Swedish legation was upgraded to embassy moved from Nanjing to Shanghai. From 1947 to 1948, it was located at 9 Nan-Whangputan, Shanghai. By 1949, it had moved to 9 Chung Shan Lu, Eastern (II), Shanghai 13, and in 1950 to Cathay Mansions, Shanghai 13. In 1951, the embassy relocated to Beijing. A consulate chancery remained in Shanghai, located at 9 Chung Shan Lu (E 2), Shanghai 13, from 1951 to 1955. The consulate chancery was closed in December 1956.

The Consulate General was reopened in 1996. From 1998 to 2003, it was located at 6 A Qi Hua Tower, 1375 Huaihai Zhongtu. Between 2004 and 2010, it was located at 1530–1541, 15/E Shanghai Central Plaza, 381 Huaihai Zhong Road. It was later moved to 1521–1541 Central Plaza at the same address.

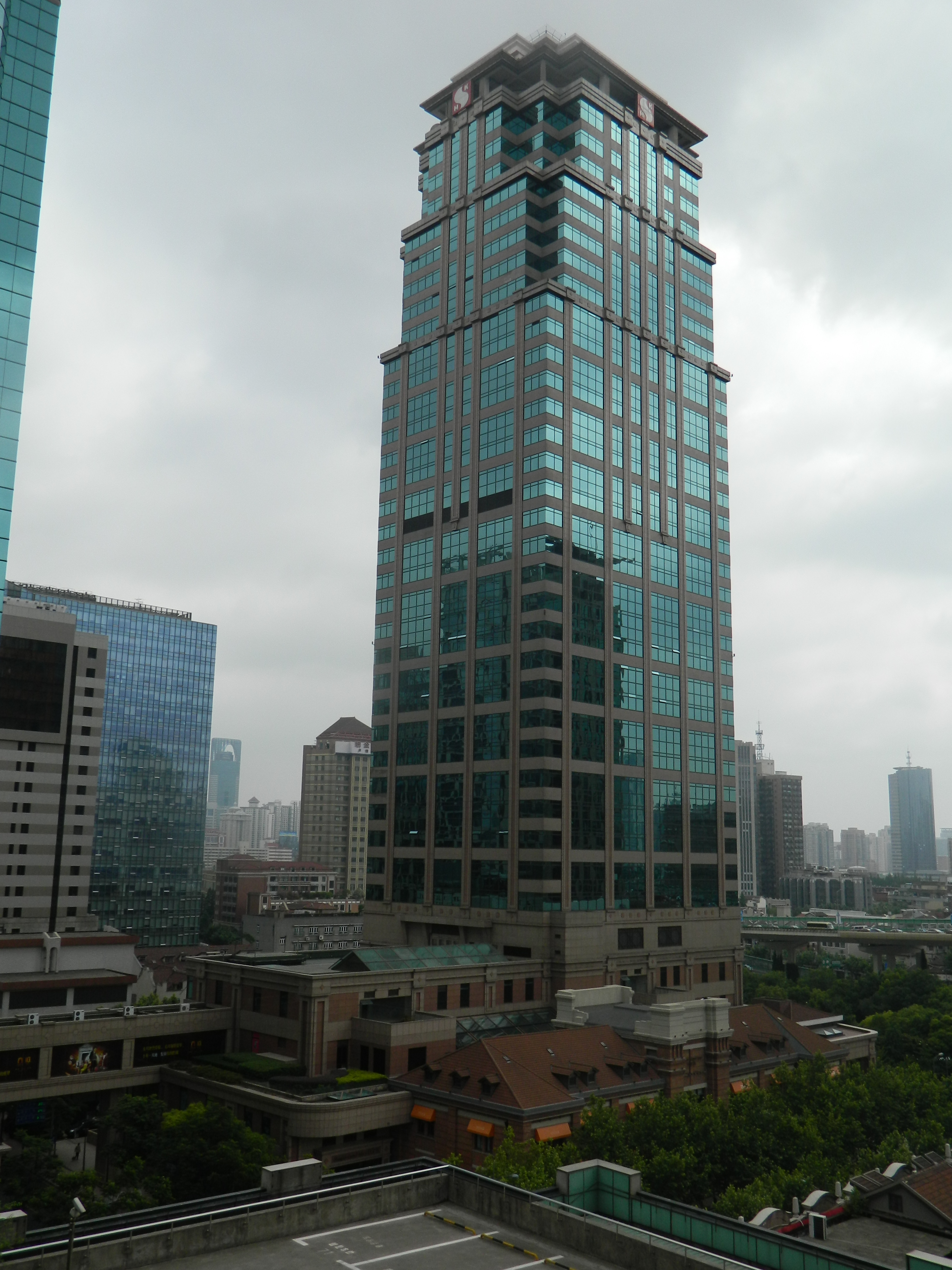
Shanghai Central Plaza
(2004–present)

=== Residence ===
During the 1930s, the residence of the Consul General—later that of the envoy—was located on Hungjao Road. On 8 November 1937, during the Battle of Shanghai, the residence was damaged and looted. At that time, the envoy was living in a temporary residence on Great Western Road, within the international concession.

Today, the residence is located at 33 Xiangshan Road, house 3 in the former French Concession.

== Heads of Mission ==
Name	Period	Title	Notes	Ref
Edvard Cunningham	8 May 1863 – 29 June 1864	Acting consul general	Vice consul in 1853	
Francis Blackwell Forbes	29 June 1864 – 27 February 1882	Consul general		
H. De Courcy Forbes	27 February 1882 – 10 May 1883	Acting consul general		
Joseph Haas	10 May 1883 – 16 May 1884	Acting consul general		
Oscar Lagerheim	16 May 1884 – 24 June 1886	Acting consul general	Died in office.	
Joseph Haas	22 October 1886 – 3 February 1893	Acting consul general		
Carl Bock	3 February 1893	Acting consul general		
Carl Bock	29 January 1897 – 12 December 1902	Consul general		
Carl Filip Alexander Hagberg	18 November 1903 – 28 September 1906	Consul general		
Carl Richard Esaias Bagge	28 September 1906 – 6 July 1910	Consul general	Died in office.	
Axel Torsten Uddén	1910–1911	Acting consul general		
Johan Hultman	28 February 1911 – 1920	Consul general		
Patrik Reuterswärd	14 February 1914 – 23 November 1914	Acting consul general & consular judge		
Evert Åkerhielm	31 December 1919 – 1921	Acting consul general & consular judge		
Jonas Alströmer	16 December 1921 – 17 March 1922	Consul general & consular judge		
Johan Lilliehöök af Fårdala	17 March 1922 – 1932	Consul general & consular judge		
Widar Bagge	1930–1931	Acting consul general		
Einar Lindquist	1932 – 1 February 1936	Consul general and chargé d'affaires ad interim	Also Consul General of Sweden for Hong Kong.	
Johan Beck-Friis	1 February 1936 – 30 June 1937	Consul general and chargé d'affaires ad interim (Note: Consul General in Shanghai and also chargé d'affaires ad interim in China as of 18 January 1936. Appointed with the title of minister on 28 November 1936. Designated to serve as envoy to China on 30 May 1937, effective from 1 July 1937.)	Envoy from 1 July 1937.	
In 1937, the Consulate General was reorganized into a chancery under the authority of the Swedish legation, and from 1947, under the Swedish embassy. The chancery was closed in 1956.
Bengt Johansson	1996–1999	Consul general		
Eskil Lundberg	1999–2003	Consul general		
Lars Andreasson	2003–2008	Consul general		
Bengt Johansson	2008–2012	Consul general		
Viktoria Li	2012–2016	Consul general		
Lisette Lindahl	2016–2020	Consul general		
Marie-Claire Swärd Capra	2020–2025	Consul general		
Annika Hahn-Englund	2025–present	Consul general		

== See also ==
- China–Sweden relations
- Consulate General of Sweden, Hong Kong
