= Consulate General of Sweden, Hong Kong =

Diplomatic mission of Sweden in Hong Kong

- Location: Hong Kong
- Address: Room 2501, 25/F., BEA Harbour View Centre, 56 Gloucester Road, Wanchai, Hong Kong
- Coordinates: 22.27891°N 114.17125°E
- Opening: 3 June 1853 (Note: The consulate general has its origins in the honorary consulate which was opened on 3 June 1853 and which, after both downgrading and upgrading, became a consulate general in 1968.)
- Jurisdiction: Hong Kong; Macau
- Consul General: Louise Bergholm
- Website: Official website

The Consulate General of Sweden, Hong Kong (Swedish: Sveriges generalkonsulat i Hongkong) is Sweden's diplomatic mission in Hong Kong. The consulate general is also responsible for relations with Macau.

Established as an honorary consulate in 1853, it became a career consulate in 1954 and was elevated to the status of consulate general in 1968. Before the transfer of sovereignty in 1997, the consulate operated in British Hong Kong. Since 1997, its consular district has included the Hong Kong and Macau special administrative regions of China.

The consulate represents Sweden in political, economic, and cultural matters and reports on developments in Hong Kong and Macau to Swedish authorities. It also provides consular services and assistance to Swedish citizens in the region.

== History ==
=== Background ===
During the early years of the Age of Empire (1870s to mid-1880s), Sweden–Norway sought to expand its influence by increasing its consular presence in territories where major imperial powers were establishing colonial order. Unlike these powers, Sweden–Norway had few diplomatic missions, relying instead on consuls to represent its interests. The primary goal was to gain political prestige and economic benefits by supporting Swedish and Norwegian merchants and shipowners. However, the consular service faced several challenges. Consuls were often appointed based on reputation and connections rather than qualifications, leading to a lack of necessary skills and knowledge about Sweden–Norway's economic interests. Many consuls were Western merchants who also represented multiple countries and were deeply integrated into colonial networks. Despite some successes in social and political integration, the consular service struggled with economic obstacles and ultimately failed to effectively support trade and shipping. Efforts to reform the consular service, including the appointment of a reform committee in 1875, were insufficient, and by the time of the Berlin Conference almost a decade later, significant issues remained unresolved. This lack of a well-thought-out plan led to an inefficient consular service that did not meet its intended economic goals.

=== 1853–1937 ===
In the late 19th century, Swedish-Norwegian authorities regarded Hong Kong as an important distribution center in East Asia, alongside Singapore. However, trade between Sweden-Norway and Hong Kong remained limited. Swedish-Norwegian vessels arriving in Hong Kong commonly carried coal from England and returned with cargoes such as rice and sugar. The relatively small volume of trade and shipping also limited the scope of consular activity in the region. The British dominions of British Hong Kong and British Singapore were among the locations included in the reorganization of the Swedish-Norwegian consular service in East Asia. Consulates were established in both locations in the early 1850s and were initially operated by foreign merchant consuls. In Hong Kong, German merchant consuls associated with the firms Russell & Company and Schellhass were among those involved in providing consular services. Both firms also had commercial interests in Shanghai.

The consulate was established by letters patent on 3 June 1853, and its consular district included the British colony of Hong Kong. By decision on 15 November 1867, it was determined that a consulate general would be established for China and other East Asian countries with a salary of 8,000 riksdaler banco, and that Victoria in Hong Kong would temporarily serve as the residence of the consul general. However, on 22 November 1867, the salary was used to compensate Premiärlöjtnant Herman Annerstedt for a special mission to study the trade and maritime conditions of Sweden–Norway in East Asia, and the consulate general was temporarily still located in Shanghai. Similar to the situation in Shanghai, the consulate in Hong Kong experienced considerable turbulence in the 1870s and 1880s. In April 1885, the Swedish-Norwegian government appointed Rudolf (Peter) Buschmann as the fifth consul in twelve years. Buschmann was a German merchant and senior partner of Schellhass, who also served as the Dutch consul. However, his tenure was short, lasting only three years before he was replaced by Friedrich Seip, who would become the last consul in Hong Kong.

In the early 1870s, the consular services in Victoria (Hong Kong) and other regions were criticized for their inadequacies. Norwegian dissatisfaction was particularly notable, and despite increasing commercial activities in East Asia, consular development lagged behind. Swedish-Norwegian ships visiting Hong Kong averaged 17 per year from 1870 to 1874, with the number declining to 13 ships by 1879. Consular appointments in Hong Kong faced challenges. In the mid-1870s, the resignation of Vice Consul Rudolf Jensen led to discussions about consular strategy in East Asia. In 1878, Hans Kjær was appointed as consul in Hong Kong, despite opposition from the Norwegians, who had preferred Ludvig Beyer. Kjær's tenure was short-lived due to his economic and social shortcomings, and he was replaced by John Murray Forbes of the Forbes family. Subsequent appointees, such as Charles Vincent Smith, who also worked as representative of Russell & Company, and Rudolf (Peter) Buschmann, also faced challenges, reflecting a persistent disconnect between the Swedish-Norwegian interests and the local commercial environment.

By 1895, the Swedish-Norwegian authorities noted that no Swedish ship had visited Hong Kong in the previous five years. This prompted a reassessment of the need for a full consulate in Hong Kong. Consequently, on 22 May 1896, the consulate was downgraded to a vice consulate, and the district was placed under the jurisdiction of the consulate general in Shanghai. This decision was supported by former Foreign Minister and then Minister to London, Carl Lewenhaupt, and Consul General Carl Bock in Shanghai. In the late 1890s, further efforts to reorganize and improve consular services in East Asia were undertaken. A report by consul Ove Gude highlighted the need for salaried consulates in key locations, including Hong Kong. Gude's report emphasized the importance of having Swedish and Norwegian consuls who could effectively represent their countries' interests, as foreign merchant consuls often prioritized their own national interests. However, Gude's proposals were largely rejected by Norwegian authorities, who deemed the costs too high and the direct trade with East Asia too insignificant to justify such an expansion.

By the early 20th century, the Swedish-Norwegian consular service continued to face challenges in effectively managing their interests in Hong Kong and the broader East Asian region. Despite some improvements and the recognition of increasing Norwegian shipping activities, the overall impact of the consular services remained limited due to economic constraints and the prevailing political and judicial priorities over commercial interests.

=== 1937–present ===
In May 1937, the King in Council decided to establish an honorary consulate in Hong Kong and appointed Vice Consul Geoffrey Miskin as consul there. In November 1947, Vice Consul Cedric Blaker was appointed as the new honorary consul. In May 1954, Blaker was granted dismissal, and the honorary consulate was replaced by a career consulate. Torsten Brandel, the counsellor at the Swedish embassy in Copenhagen, was appointed consul in Hong Kong. Brandel arrived in Hong Kong on 28 June 1954, accompanied by Vice Consul Gösta Rönnhed and Secretary Ingrid Gremmel. Until 1954, the honorary consulate in Hong Kong had been under the jurisdiction of the Swedish embassy in Beijing.

In 1968, the consulate was elevated to a consulate general.

In anticipation of Hong Kong's reunification with China, Sweden entered into a consular agreement with China regarding Hong Kong in 1996.

== District ==
The consulate was opened in 1853 and its consular district covered British Hong Kong. This lasted until 1997. Since 1997, the district consists of the special administrative regions of Hong Kong and Macau.

== Tasks ==
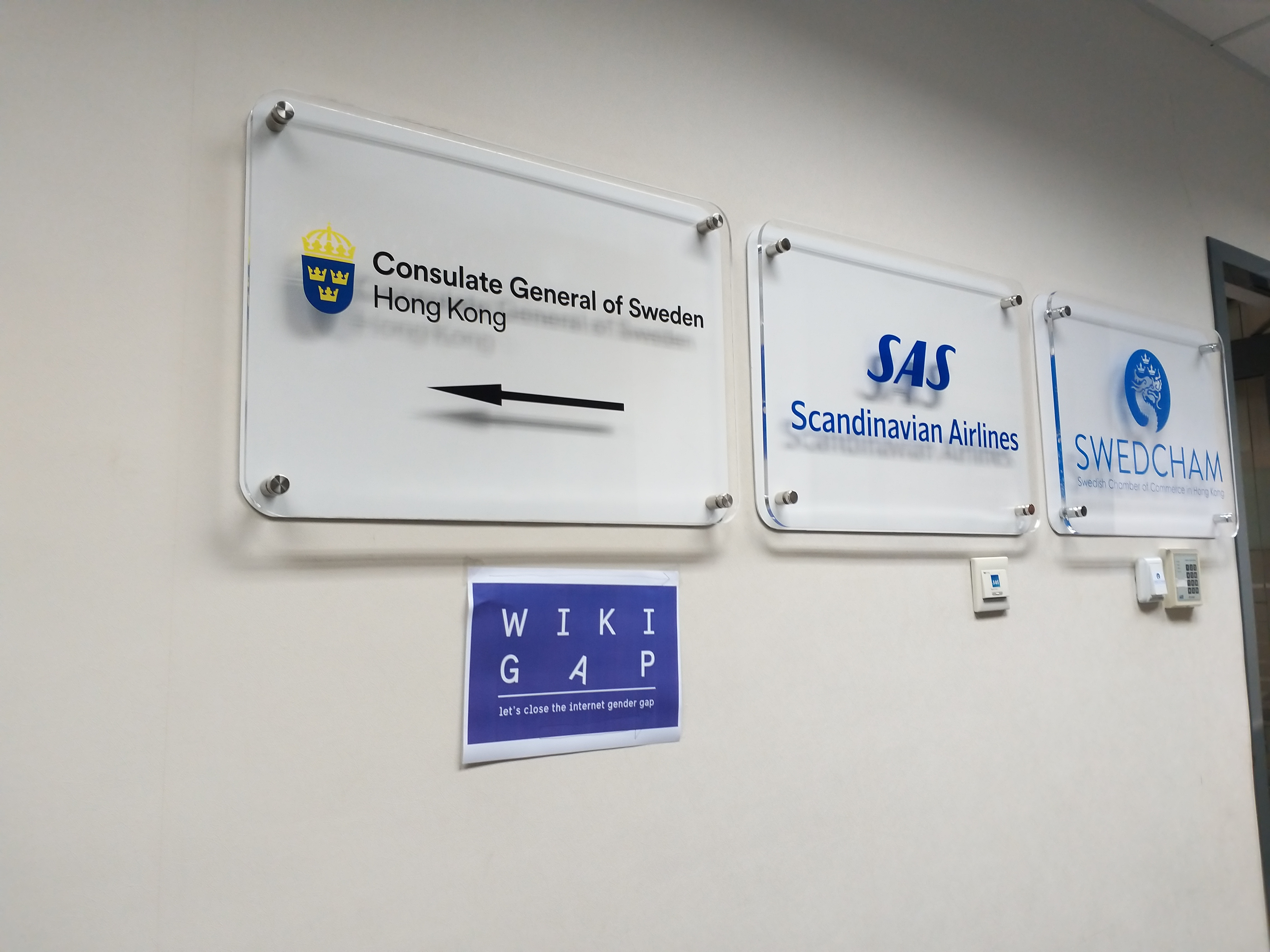
Sign of the consulate general and the Swedish Chamber of Commerce

The Consulate General of Sweden in Hong Kong is Sweden's diplomatic mission in Hong Kong and is also responsible for Macau. Its functions include representing Sweden and maintaining contacts with authorities and organizations in the region on political, economic, and cultural matters. The consulate supports Swedish economic and commercial interests, including trade and investment relations, research and educational exchanges, cultural cooperation, and tourism. It also monitors political and economic developments in Hong Kong and Macau and reports relevant information to Sweden's Ministry for Foreign Affairs and the Government Offices. Another function of the consulate is to provide consular services to Swedish citizens residing in or visiting Hong Kong and Macau. These services include assistance in emergencies and information concerning local conditions.

The consulate works alongside Business Sweden and the Swedish Chamber of Commerce in Hong Kong (SWEDCHAM) on matters relating to Swedish business and economic interests in the region.

== Buildings ==
=== Chancery ===
From 1955 to 1959, the chancery was located at Room 605, 7 Ice House Street in Central on the north shore of Hong Kong Island. From 1960 to 1965, it was located at 15 Connaught Road in Central. In August 1965, the chancery moved to new premises in a modern office building on Hong Kong Island. The new premises were furnished under the direction of the National Swedish Board of Public Building (Byggnadsstyrelsen) with Swedish furniture and textiles, Swedish lighting fixtures, and modern Swedish art on the walls. The address was 1107–08, Hang Seng Bank Building at 77 Des Voeux Road. It remained in these premises until 1981.

From 1982 to 1984, the chancery was located in Rooms 711–712, Wing on Plaza on Salisbury Road/62 Mody Road in the Tsim Sha Tsui East area in southern Kowloon. From 1985 to 2012, it was located in the Hong Kong Club Building at 3A Chater Road in Central. In 2012, the office moved to BEA Harbour View Centre at 56 Gloucester Road in Wan Chai.

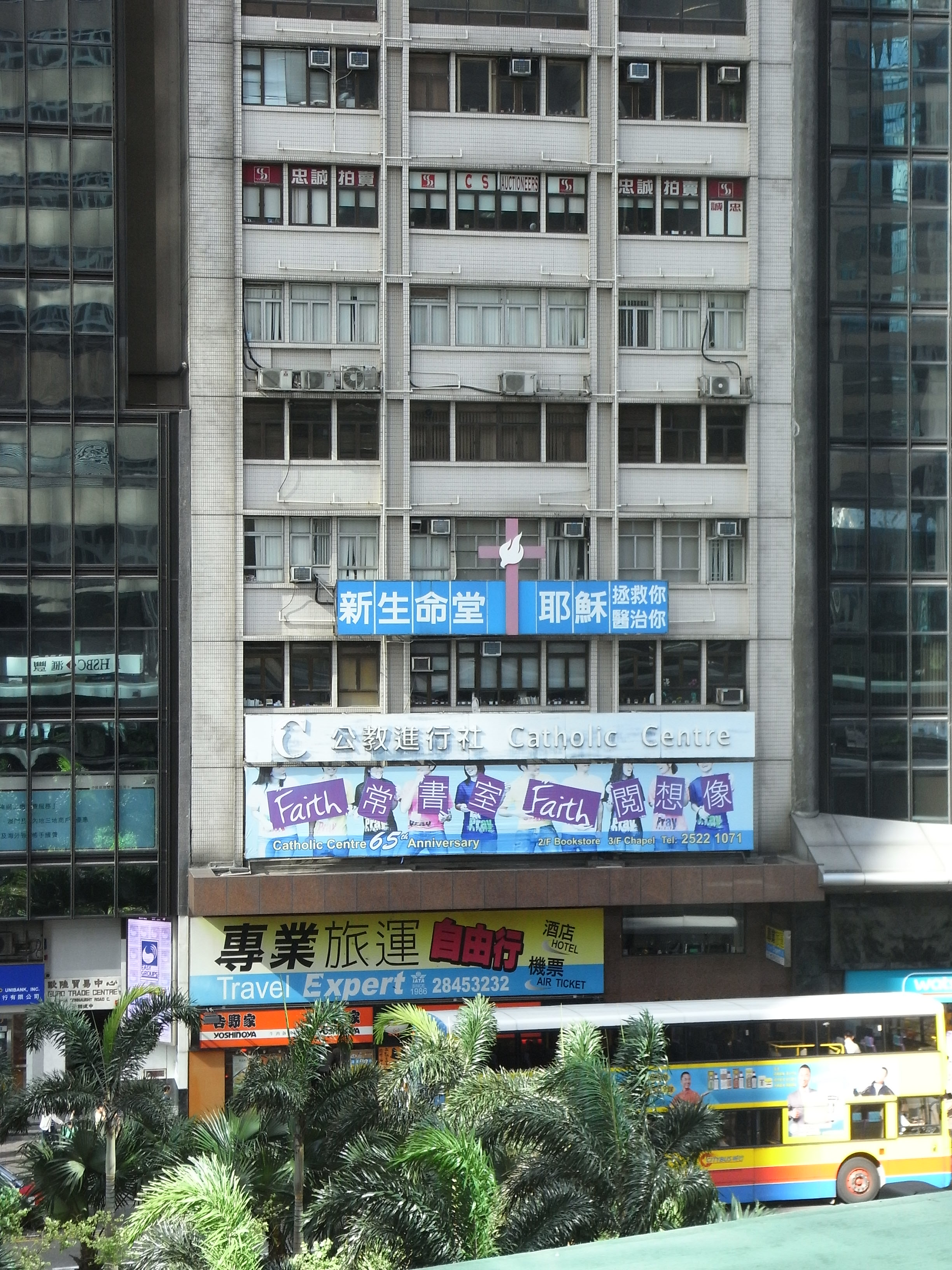
15 Connaught Road
(1960–1965)

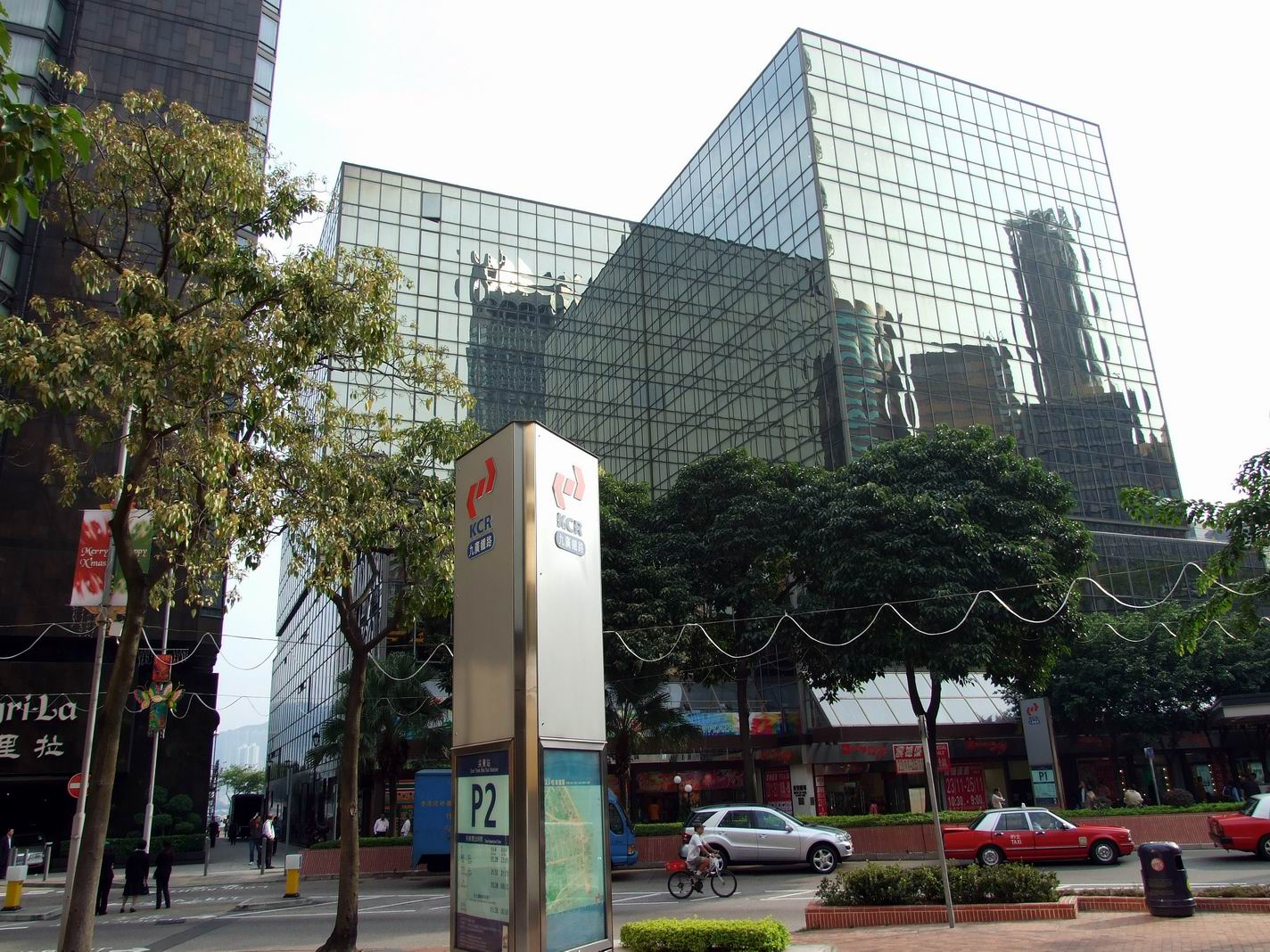
Wing on Plaza, 62 Mody Road
(1982–1984)

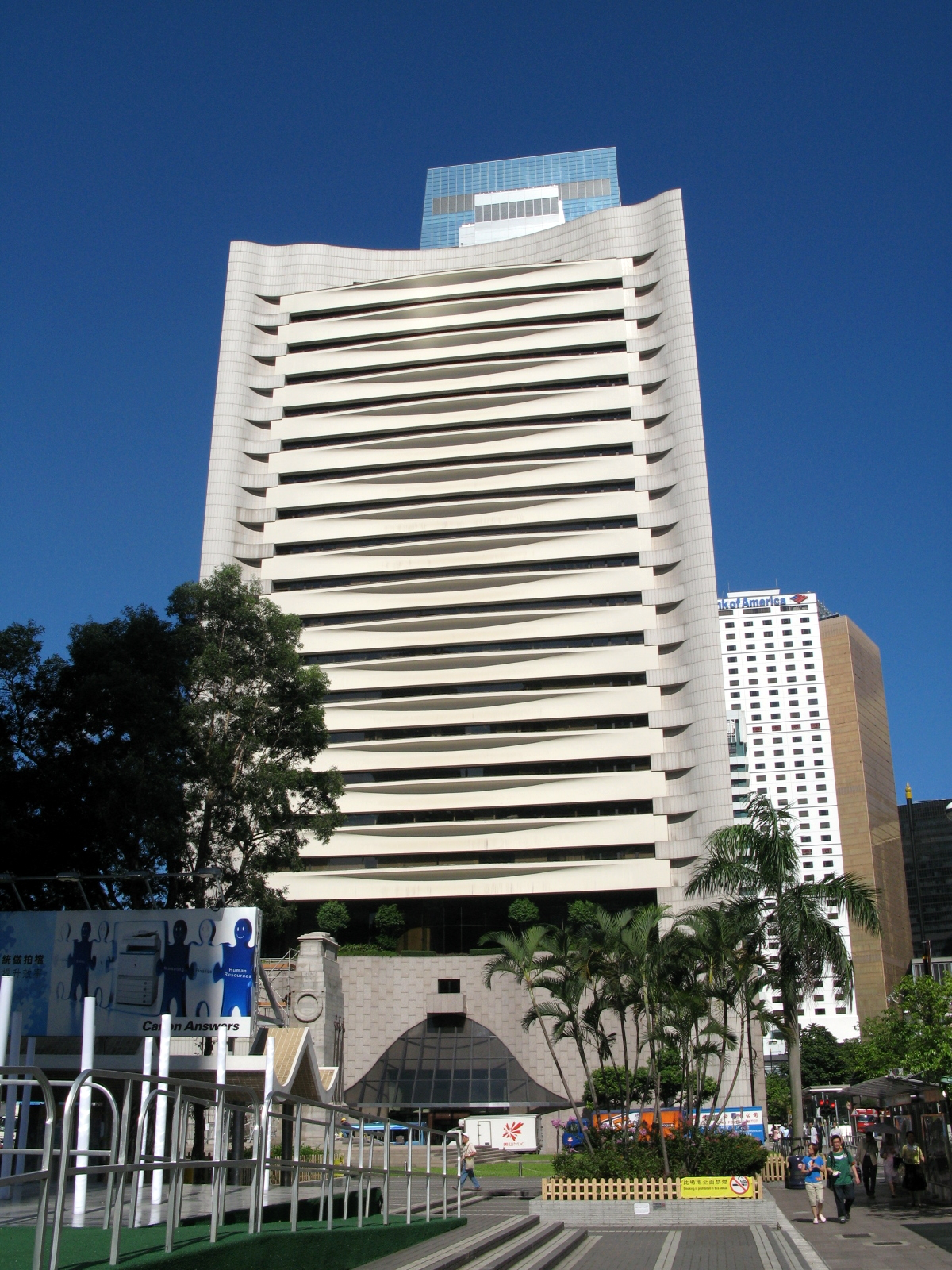
Hong Kong Club Building, 3A Chater Road
(1985–2012)

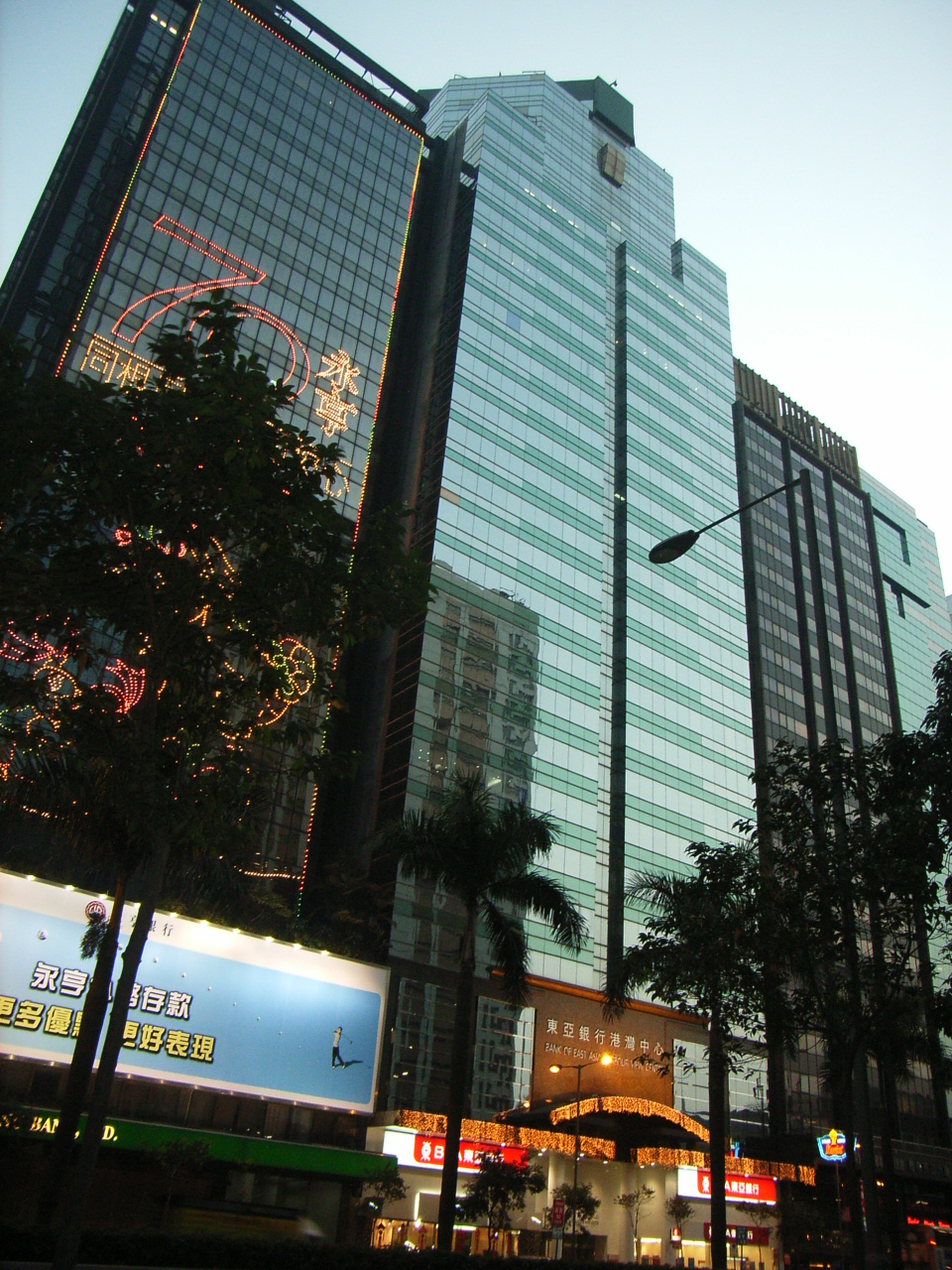
Bank of East Asia Harbour View Centre, 56 Gloucester Road
(2012–present)

=== Residence ===
The residence was located at R. B. L. 594 in Deep Water Bay on the southern shore of Hong Kong Island from 1955 to at least 1957. From at least 1965 to at least 1968, the residence was located at 55 Bisney Road in Pok Fu Lam on Hong Kong Island.

== Heads of Mission ==
Name	Period	Title	Notes	Ref
Honorary consulate (1854–1896)
Nikolaus Duus	21 November 1854 – 5 December 1861	Honorary consul	Died in office.	
Ludvig Wiese	8 May 1863 – 13 September 1865	Honorary consul		
George I. Helland	18 December 1866 – 24 January 1873	Honorary consul		
Rudolf Jensen	26 September 1873 – 12 May 1876	Honorary consul		
Hans Kjaer	15 December 1876 – 20 August 1880	Honorary consul		
John Murray Forbes	22 January 1881 – 16 December 1881	Honorary consul		
Charles Vincent Smith	16 December 1881 – 18 July 1884	Honorary consul		
Peter Julius Rudolf Diedrich Buschmann	24 April 1885 – 28 July 1888 (Note: On leave due to return to Europe in November 1886.)	Honorary consul general		
Friedrich Seip	24 May 1889 – 4 October 1895	Honorary consul general		
Honorary vice consulate (1896–1937)
–	1896–1902	Honorary vice consul	Vacant	
Gustav Harling	1902–1909	Honorary vice consul		
Schelto Swart	1909–1911	Honorary vice consul		
Arthur Nilsson	8 July 1911 – 1916	Honorary vice consul		
–	1917–1918	Honorary vice consul	Vacant	
Gunnar Ludin	1916 – April 1919	Acting honorary vice consul		
Gunnar Ludin	1919–1924	Honorary vice consul		
Geoffrey Miskin	1924–1937	Honorary vice consul		
Honorary consulate (1937–1954)
Geoffrey Miskin	1937–1947	Honorary consul		
Cedric Blaker	1947–1954	Honorary consul	Consul General's exequatur	
Consulate (1954–1968)
Torsten Brandel	1954–1956	Consul	Also in Macau (from 1955).	
Torsten Brandel	1956–1958	Consul	Consul General's exequatur	
Torsten Björck	1958–1962	Consul	Also in Macau.	
–	1963–1964	–	Vacant	
Olov Ternström	1964–1967	Consul	Also in Macau.	
Carl Kjellberg	30 June 1967 – 1968	Consul general		
Consulate general (1968–present)
Carl Kjellberg	1968–1973	Consul general		
Dag Bergman	1973–1980	Consul general	Also in Macau.	
Åke Berg	1980–1985	Consul general	Also in Macau.	
Christer Jacobson	1985–1990	Consul general	Also in Macau (from 1986).	
Ulf Norström	1990–1993	Consul general	Also in Macau.	
Mikael Westerlind	1993–1997	Consul general	Also in Macau (from 1994).	
Ingolf Kiesow	1997–2000	Consul general	Also in Macau.	
Peter Ekelund	2000–2004	Consul general	Also in Macau.	
Boel Evander	2004–2008	Consul general	Also in Macau.	
Lars Danielsson	2008–2011	Consul general	Also in Macau. Political appointee (non-career diplomat)	
Jörgen Halldin	2011–2015	Consul general	Also in Macau.	
Helena Storm	2015–2020	Consul general	Also in Macau.	
Per Augustsson	2020–2023	Consul general	Also in Macau.	
Louise Bergholm	2023–present	Consul general	Also in Macau.	

== See also ==
- China–Sweden relations
- Embassy of Sweden, Beijing
- Consulate General of Sweden, Shanghai
