= Johan Hultman =

Swedish diplomat (1876–1958)

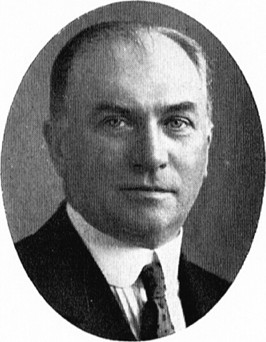
- Born: Johan Erik Evald Hultman; 10 April 1876; Malmö, Sweden
- Died: 9 November 1958 (aged 82); Malmö, Sweden
- Education: Uppsala University
- Occupation: Diplomat
- Years active: 1905–1936
- Spouse: Ella Eklund (m. 1910; died 1952)
- Children: 1

Johan Erik Evald Hultman (10 April 1876 – 9 November 1958) was a Swedish diplomat. Hultman began his diplomatic career in the early 1900s, serving in various roles including attaché and vice consul in cities such as London, Saint Petersburg, and Shanghai. In China, he supported Swedish missionary work and played a key role in diplomatic and legal initiatives, including consular court reforms and industrial agreements. By 1914, he became Sweden's top consular authority in China, reflecting the growing importance of Shanghai in Swedish foreign policy. Later, he served as consul general in Hamburg and held ambassadorial roles in Tokyo, Beijing, and Bangkok during the 1920s and 1930s.

== Early life ==
Hultman was born on 10 April 1876 in Malmö, Sweden, the son of Johan Hultman, a factory owner, and his wife Eveline (née Svensson). He was the brother of Axel Hultman. He passed studentexamen in 1893 and after a few years of employment in a store, Hultman devoted himself to studying abroad for some years. He studied at Lund University but had to discontinue his studies due to illness. After spending several years in a sanatorium in Switzerland, he joined the family business, working at the office in Stockholm. Two years later, he resumed his studies, this time in Uppsala. He received a Doctor of Philosophy degree from Uppsala University in 1903 with a major in language and a Juris utriusque candidate degree in 1905.

== Career ==
Hultman served as an assistant at the Ministry of Finance in 1905 before becoming an attaché at the Ministry for Foreign Affairs in 1906. He served as an attaché in London in 1906 and then in Cape Town. Hultman was then vice consul in Saint Petersburg and Arkhangelsk in 1909 and consul general in Shanghai in 1911.

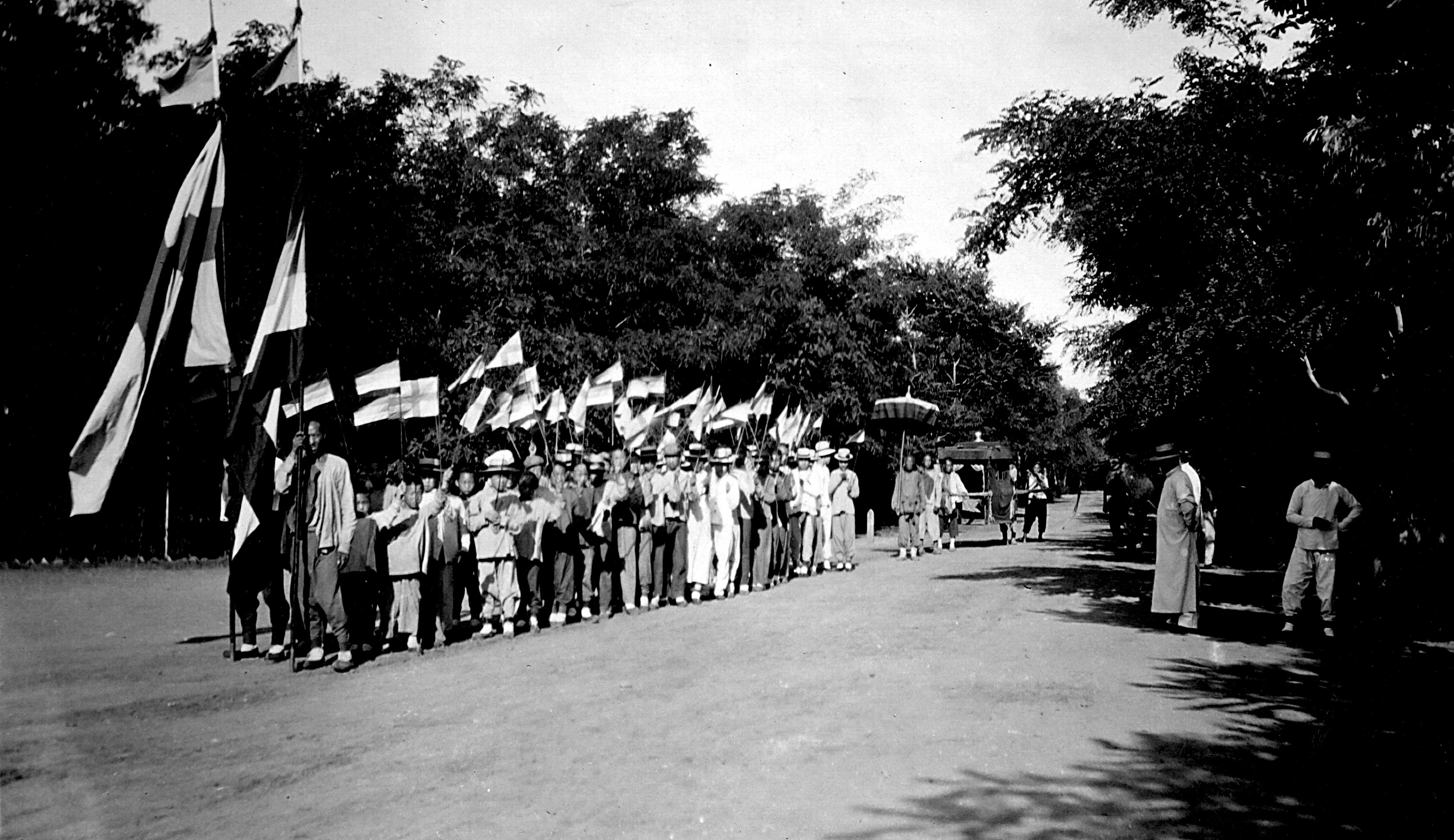
Consul General Johan Hultman carried in sedan chair in honorary procession in Jiaozhou, China, 1912

In 1912 not long after his arrival in Shanghai Hultman traveled to Jiaozhou in Shandong province and took part in the groundbreaking of a new church built under the leadership of Johan Alfred Rinell, a member of the Baptist Union of Sweden. Hultman expressed his appreciation of the Baptist Union of Sweden's church work including the establishment of schools and a medical clinic in Shandong on behalf of the Chinese people. He also participated in initiatives like drafting proposals for an international consular court in Guangzhou and negotiated industrial property rights agreements with other Western nations in China. In 1914, administrative authority over Sweden's consular service in China was transferred from Envoy Gustaf Wallenberg to Hultman, highlighting Shanghai's rising importance for Sweden. Hultman received a substantial salary increase, making Shanghai Sweden's third most costly consular post after New York City and London.

Hultman was chargé d'affaires in Helsinki in 1920 and consul general in Hamburg in 1921. He was then envoy in Tokyo from 1928 to 1936, envoy in Beijing from 1929 to 1936 (accredited from Tokyo) and envoy in Bangkok from 1931 to 1936 (accredited from Tokyo).

== Personal life ==
In 1910 he married Ella Eklund (1881–1952), the daughter of the pharmacist Edward Eklund and Gretchen (née Winge). Hultman was the father of Brita (1912–1975).

== Death ==
Hultman died on 9 November 1958. He was buried on 12 November 1958 at the Old Cemetery in his hometown of Malmö.

== Awards and decorations ==
- (Sweden) Commander 1st Class of the Order of the Polar Star (16 June 1933)
- (Sweden) Knight of the Order of the Polar Star (1915)
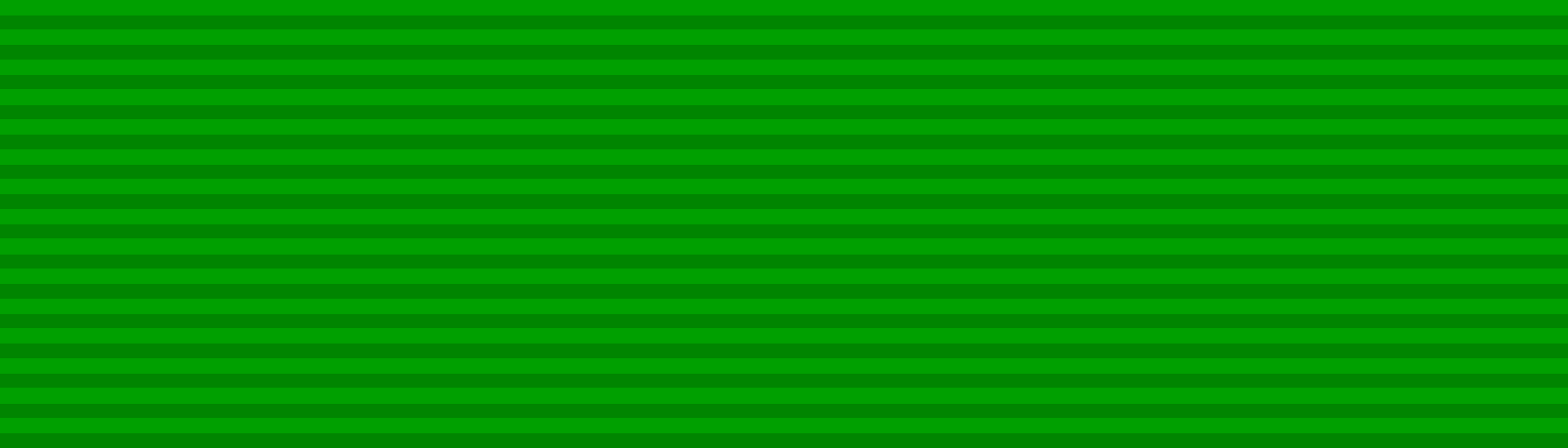
- (Sweden) Commander 1st Class of the Order of Vasa (16 June 1928)
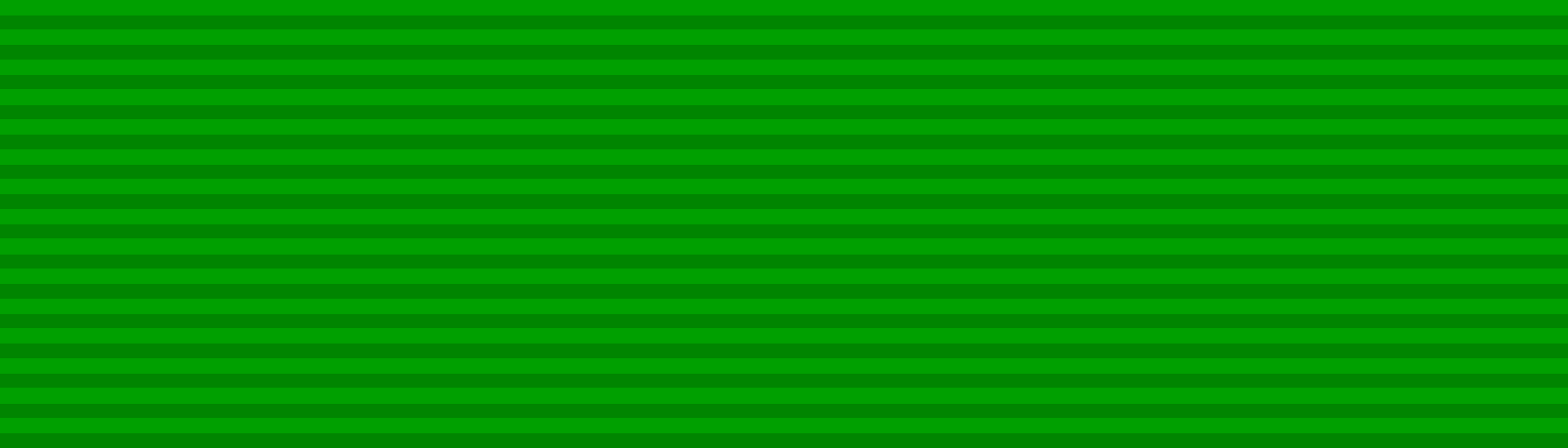
- (Sweden) Commander of the Order of Vasa (6 June 1919)
- (Empire of Japan) 1st Class of the Order of the Sacred Treasure
- (Republic of China (1912–1949)) 1st Class of the Order of Brilliant Jade
- (Thailand) 1st Class of the Order of the Crown of Siam
- (Austria) Grand Cross of the Order of Merit of the Austrian Republic
- (Republic of China (1912–1949)) 2nd Class of the Order of the Precious Brilliant Golden Grain
- (Russian Empire) Knight 3rd Class of the Order of Saint Anna
- (Russian Empire) Knight 3rd Class of the Order of Saint Stanislaus

== Honours ==
- Jubilee Doctor of Philosophy, Uppsala University (1953)

Diplomatic posts
Preceded by Carl Bagge	Consul General of Sweden to Shanghai; 1911–1920	Succeeded by Jonas Alströmer
Preceded by Axel Stridbeck as Acting Consul General	Consul General of Sweden to Hamburg; 1921–1928	Succeeded by Axel Stridbeck
Preceded by Oskar Ewerlöf	Envoy of Sweden to Japan; 1928–1936	Succeeded by Widar Bagge
Preceded by Oskar Ewerlöf	Envoy of Sweden to China; 1929–1936	Succeeded by Johan Beck-Friis
Preceded by None	Envoy of Sweden to Thailand; 1931–1936	Succeeded by Widar Bagge
