= Carl Fredrik Liljevalch Sr. =

Swedish businessman and diplomat

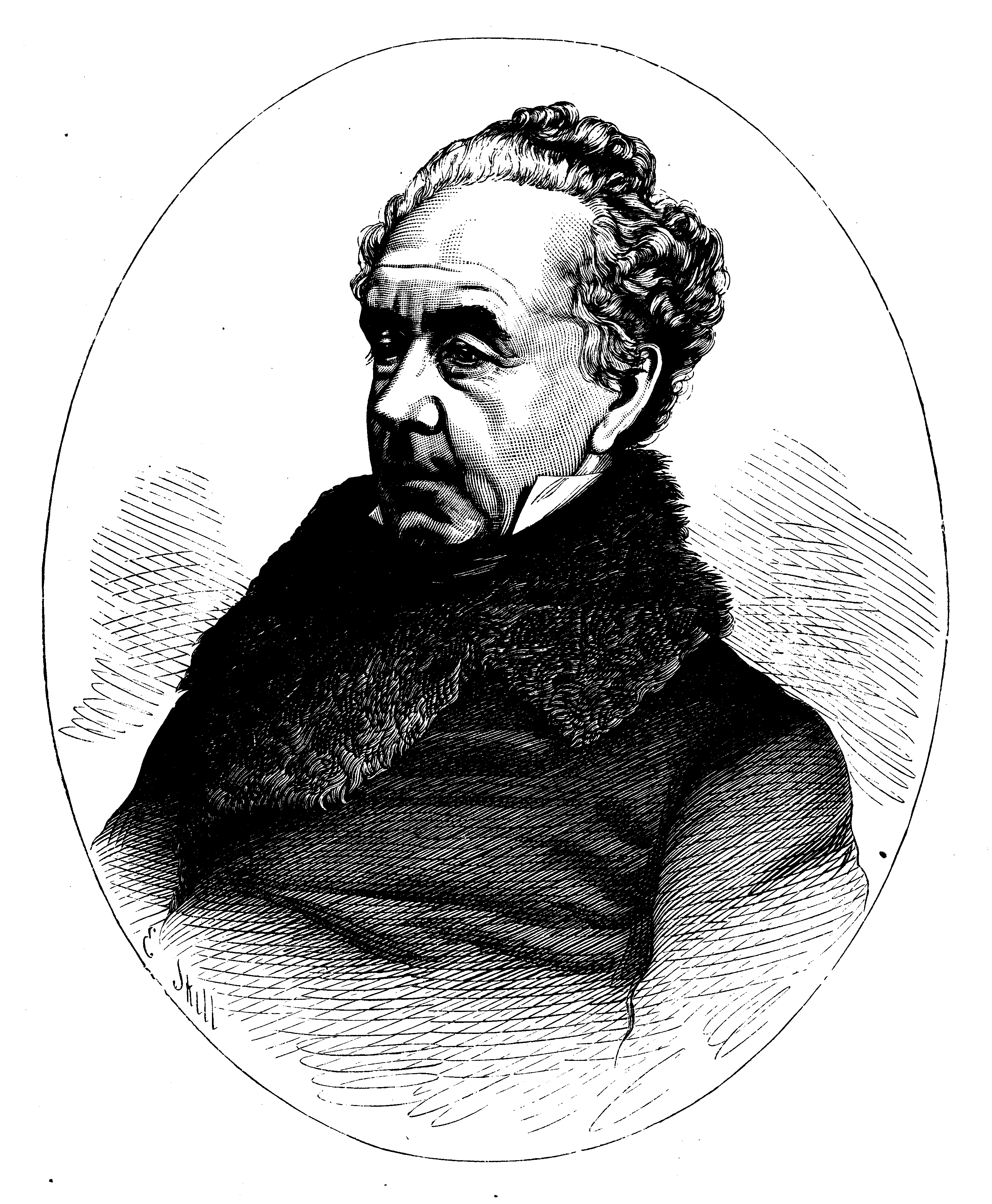
- Drawing of Liljevalch, c. 1880
- Born: 10 July 1796; Lund, Sweden
- Died: 24 June 1870 (aged 73); Stockholm
- Occupations: Businessman, diplomat

Carl Fredrik Liljevalch Sr. (10 July 1796, in Lund – 24 June 1870, in Stockholm) was a Swedish businessman, entrepreneur and diplomat. He was active in the Swedish forest industry, organizing the country's first two circumnavigations. His son, Carl Fredrik Liljevalch Jr., had an estate which laid the foundation of Stockholm's Liljevalchs konsthall.

== Career ==
In the wake of the First Opium War, King Oscar I sent Liljevalch to China to conclude a commercial treaty with China. In March 1847, Liljevalch and Manchu statesman Qiying codified the Treaty of Canton, which was Sweden-Norway and China's first-ever treaty. The Treaty was almost identical to the Treaty of Wanghia which had been written three years earlier, and it gave Sweden-Norway the same privileges as the other treaty powers. The treaty remained in force until well into the twentieth century.

On returning home, Liljevalch published in 1848 an account of his time in China called China's trade industry and government, and accounts of the education of the Chinese people; their customs and habits; and notices of Japan, Siam, and other.
