= Shanghai Communiqué =

1972 US–PRC diplomatic agreement

- Traditional Chinese: 上海公報
- Simplified Chinese: 上海公报
Transcriptions

Alternative Chinese name
- Traditional Chinese: 中華人民共和國和美利堅合眾國聯合公報
- Simplified Chinese: 中华人民共和国和美利坚合众国联合公报
Transcriptions
Standard Mandarin
- Hanyu Pinyin: Zhōnghuá Rénmín Gònghéguó hé Měilìjiān Hézhòngguó liánhé gōngbào

Joint Communiqué of the United States of America and the People's Republic of China
- Location: Shanghai, People's Republic of China
- Signatories: Richard Nixon (for the United States); Zhou Enlai (for the People's Republic of China)
- Purpose: Diplomatic normalization

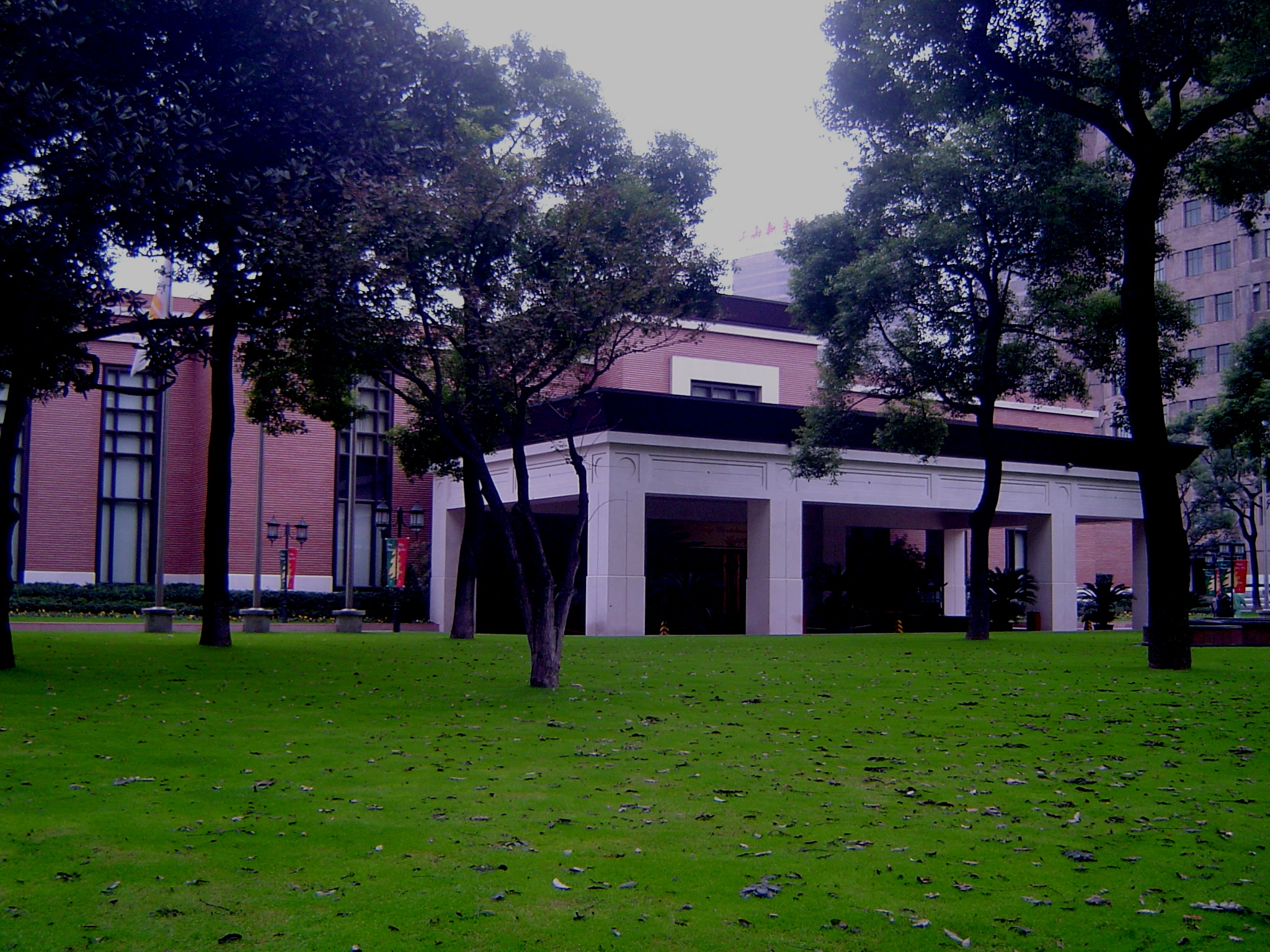
The hall at Jinjiang Hotel, site of the signing of the communiqué.

The Joint Communiqué of the United States of America and the People's Republic of China, also known as the Shanghai Communiqué (1972), was a diplomatic document issued by the United States of America and the People's Republic of China on February 27, 1972, on the last evening of President Richard Nixon's visit to China.

== Background ==
National Security Advisor Henry Kissinger was sent to China for secret diplomatic missions in 1971, which included early deliberations over the communiqué and planning for Richard Nixon to visit the country. Premier Zhou Enlai served as the Chinese liaison in the negotiations, with whom Kissinger had 25 hours of documented meetings. Kissinger did not use translators from the State Department due to concerns of leaking.

Kissinger's secret visits involved seven drafts over the contents of the Shanghai Communiqué. Kissinger was initially interested in drafting a communiqué that only mentioned the mutual interests between the United States and China, but Zhou sought to include disagreements between their respective states in order to create a more meaningful document. This move towards an honest representation of relations impressed Kissinger, who increasingly held a favorable view on Chinese leadership.

Further negotiations over the communiqué took place with White House Chief of Staff General Alexander Haig representing the United States while preparing in China a month prior to Nixon's visit. Informed by the 1969 Sino-Soviet border conflict, Haig emphasized the border threat that the Soviet Union posed to China and argued that there was a significant mutual interest between the United States and China in information sharing and otherwise militarily countering the Soviet Union. Zhou and Mao Zedong both viewed the remarks as disingenuous and ignorant of Chinese defense capabilities. However, they believed that Haig's statements reflected a genuine desire from the United States for détente.

=== Nixon's visit ===
During the February 1972 visit, the narrative of shared Sino-American interests in counteracting the Soviet Union were repeated numerous times by Nixon and Kissinger. Mao, when updated on Zhou Enlai's meetings with the American delegation, continued to be skeptical of the helpfulness of the security proposals. Zhou was somewhat responsive towards specific offers from Kissinger for aid in early warning detection.

On February 25, disagreements over the contents of the communiqué arose within the American delegation. The communiqué at that point had recognized the security treaties the United States had entered with Japan and South Korea. Then Secretary of State William Rogers and diplomat Marshall Green rejected Nixon and Kissinger's intentional lack of mention of the Sino-American Mutual Defense Treaty signed with Taiwan in 1955, claiming that the absence was a betrayal of a close ally. Working with Qiao Guanhua, Kissinger resolved the disagreement on February 26 by removing all language pertaining to treaties.

The finished communiqué was signed on the evening of February 27, 1972 at the Jinjiang Hotel in Shanghai. Nixon left China the following morning.

== Document ==
The document covers three main aspects for the United States and China. The United States formally acknowledged that "all Chinese on either side of the Taiwan Strait maintain there is but one China". The use of the word "acknowledge" rather than "accept" is often cited as an example of the United States' ambiguous position regarding the future of Taiwan. American negotiators used the term "acknowledge" to refer to knowledge and understanding (renshi dao (认识到) in Chinese), but it was translated into Chinese by their Chinese counterparts as cheng ren (承认), which meant recognition and acceptance, a much stronger term. The discrepancy has been cited as an example of how the Chinese government has applied the Maoist doctrine of protracted war. In the communique, there is an excerpt that explains what bilateral trade would mean between the two countries. In the text it states, "Both sides view bilateral trade as another area from which mutual benefit can be derived, and agreed that economic relations based on equality and mutual respect are in the interest of the peoples of the two countries. They agree to facilitate the progressive development of trade between their two countries."

The communiqué also included wishes of a peaceful coexistence and to expand the economic and cultural contacts between the two nations through bilateral trade, although no concrete steps were mentioned. Both nations agreed in the communiqué to increase "people-to-people contacts" and commerce prospects while also working toward the "normalization" of relations. The communiqué stated that the normalization of relations would contribute "to the relaxation of tension in Asia and the world". In the communique it states, "... The two sides agreed that countries, regardless of their social systems, should conduct their relations on the principles of respect for the sovereignty and territorial integrity of all states, non-aggression against other states, non-interference in the internal affairs of other states, equality and mutual benefit, and peaceful coexistence."

Each country had something to gain from the communiqué. For the United States, this represented a geopolitical realignment to counter-balance Soviet influence. This alignment significantly weakened the Soviet Union's strategic position in the Cold War and would become the demise of the Soviet Union and Soviet Bloc. The Communiqué made it possible for the United States to reorient its foreign policy and successfully isolate the Soviet Union. The Soviets now faced enemies on both the eastern and western fronts as a result of the Sino-American collaboration which upset the balance of power. This was especially clear during the arms race when the United States confronted China during negotiations with the Soviet Union on arms control, pushing them to take a defensive stance. Within the Communist bloc, ideological divisions were revealed and widened by the Shanghai Communiqué. Soviet hegemony was challenged by the distinct courses taken by countries like Yugoslavia and Romania. The communique exposed the fact that not all Communist nations adopted Moscow's policies, undermining the legitimacy of Soviet doctrine and its capacity to keep its allies united. Nixon's visit significantly changed the global power dynamics by opening the door to new trade opportunities with China and may have brought an end to the Cold War in East Asia. This would also open up opportunities for greater influence in China through engagement. On the other hand, China saw the end of their diplomatic isolation from the United States and gained international recognition. China also regained the seat in the United Nations from Taiwan.

== Legacy ==
"[W]hat we have said in that communiqué is not nearly as important as what we will do in the years ahead to build a bridge across 16,000 miles and 22 years of hostility which have divided us in the past."

— Richard Nixon, speaking at a Shanghai banquet shortly after the issuing of the communiqué, February 27, 1972

The Shanghai Communiqué represented the United States' first direct public diplomatic negotiations with People's Republic of China since its 1949 founding.

After the signing of the communiqué, political scientist Lucian Pye said that in contrast to American practices, "the Chinese do not treat the signing of a contract as signaling a complete agreement; rather they conceive of the relationship in longer and more continuous terms, and will not hesitate to suggest modifications immediately on the heels of an agreement."

In a March 1972 visit to Taipei, US diplomat Marshall Green argued to Taiwanese Foreign Minister Chow Shu-Kai that the acceptance of the communiqué represented a change in PRC priorities. Namely, Green argued the communiqué demonstrated that the PRC valued peace with the United States above confrontation with Taiwan, and subsequently increased the security of Taiwan.

William F. Buckley Jr., the conservative anti-communist commentator who accompanied Nixon on the trip, was critical, however. He wrote an extensive attack in National Review of March 1972, calling the Communiqué a "staggering capitulation" that represented the loss of "any remaining sense of moral mission in the world."

The aftermath of the Watergate scandal later in 1972 led Nixon to deprioritize further diplomatic efforts with the PRC.

Relations between the two countries were officially normalized with the Joint Communiqué on the Establishment of Diplomatic Relations, issued on January 1, 1979, which is the same day that Taiwan Relations Act retroactively entered into force, and the day after official diplomatic relations with Republic of China ended.

In a February 2017 opinion piece for The Diplomat, National Committee on U.S.-China Relations president Stephen Orlins praised the Shanghai Communiqué for the cross-strait stability it offered for Taiwan. Orlins said the communiqué helps ensure confidence with Western investment in Taiwan because of the wide-ranging impacts of the reform and opening up in China and continued high-level cross-strait dialogue.

== See also ==
- Ping-pong diplomacy
- Three Communiqués
- China-United States relations
