= Carl Bock (explorer) =

Norwegian author and explorer

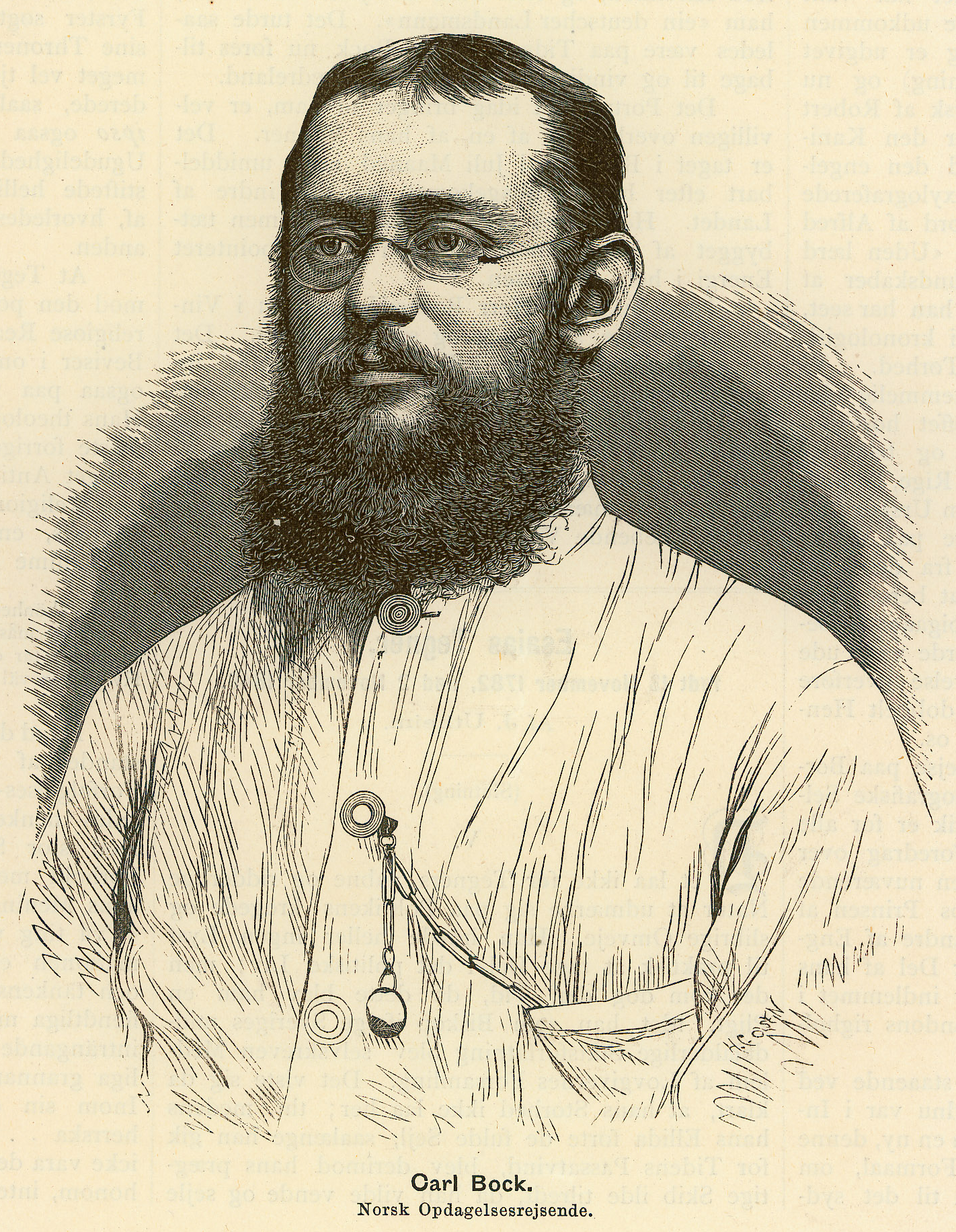
- Carl Bock (1882)
- Born: 17 September 1849; Copenhagen
- Died: 10 August 1932 (aged 82); Brussels
- Education: Kristiansand Cathedral School
- Occupations: Explorer, public servant, naturalist, author
- Known for: Books about Southeast Asia and East Asia
- Awards: Order of St. Olav

Carl Alfred Bock (Norwegian pronunciation: [ˈbuːk]; 17 September 1849 – 10 August 1932) was a Norwegian government official, author, naturalist and explorer.

== Biography ==
Bock was born in Copenhagen, Denmark when his parents were traveling on business. He was the son of merchant and factory owner Carl Henirich Bock (1812–1877) and Regitze Hansen (1826–1900). His parents had a cotton factory in Sweden. He grew up in Kristiansand and attended Kristiansand Cathedral School. He continued his education at Christiansfeld in Sønderjylland, Denmark. Later he studied zoology and natural sciences in London, England.

Bock served for six years at the Norwegian-Swedish Foreign Consulate at the seaport of Grimsby, England before he came to London in 1875. He obtained private funding, especially from Arthur Hay, 9th Marquess of Tweeddale for a journey of discovery to Sumatra and Borneo from 1878 to 1879 under authority of Johan Wilhelm van Lansberge, Governor-general of the Dutch East Indies. With the support of the King Chulalongkorn, he traveled in 1881 around the interior of Siam and Laos.

In 1886, he joined the joint Swedish-Norwegian Foreign Consulate Service. He was Norwegian-Swedish vice-consul at Shanghai in 1886 and in 1893 consul general in Shanghai. From 1899 to 1900, he was consul in Antwerp and 1900–1903 Consul General in Lisbon. He left the Foreign Consulate Service in 1903 and settled in Brussels.

He was a member of the Norwegian Academy of Science and Letters (Videnskapsselskapet i Kristiania) and was a knight, first class of the Order of St. Olav. His large collection of artifacts from Thailand and Indonesia is now kept principally at the British Museum in London.

A species of snake, Atractus bocki, is named in his honor.

== Selected works ==
- Descriptions of two new Species of Shells from China and Japan (1878).
- List of Land and Freshwater Shells collected in Sumatra and Borneo, with Descriptions of new Species (1881).
- The Head-Hunters of Borneo: A Narrative of Travel Up the Mahakkam and Down the Barito; Also, Journeyings in Sumatra (1882).
- Temples and Elephants: Narrative of a Journey of Exploration Through Upper Siam and Lao (1884).

== Other sources ==
- Reece, Bob (1995). "Carl Bock, explorations and travels in Sumatra, Borneo, and Siam". In King, Victor T. (ed.). Explorers of South-East Asia: Six Lives. Oxford, England: Oxford University Press. p. 300. ISBN 9789676530776.

Diplomatic posts
Preceded by Joseph Haas	Consul General of Sweden–Norway to Shanghai; 1893–1902	Succeeded by Carl Filip Alexander Hagberg
