= Johan Beck-Friis =

Swedish diplomat

Baron Johan Beck-Friis
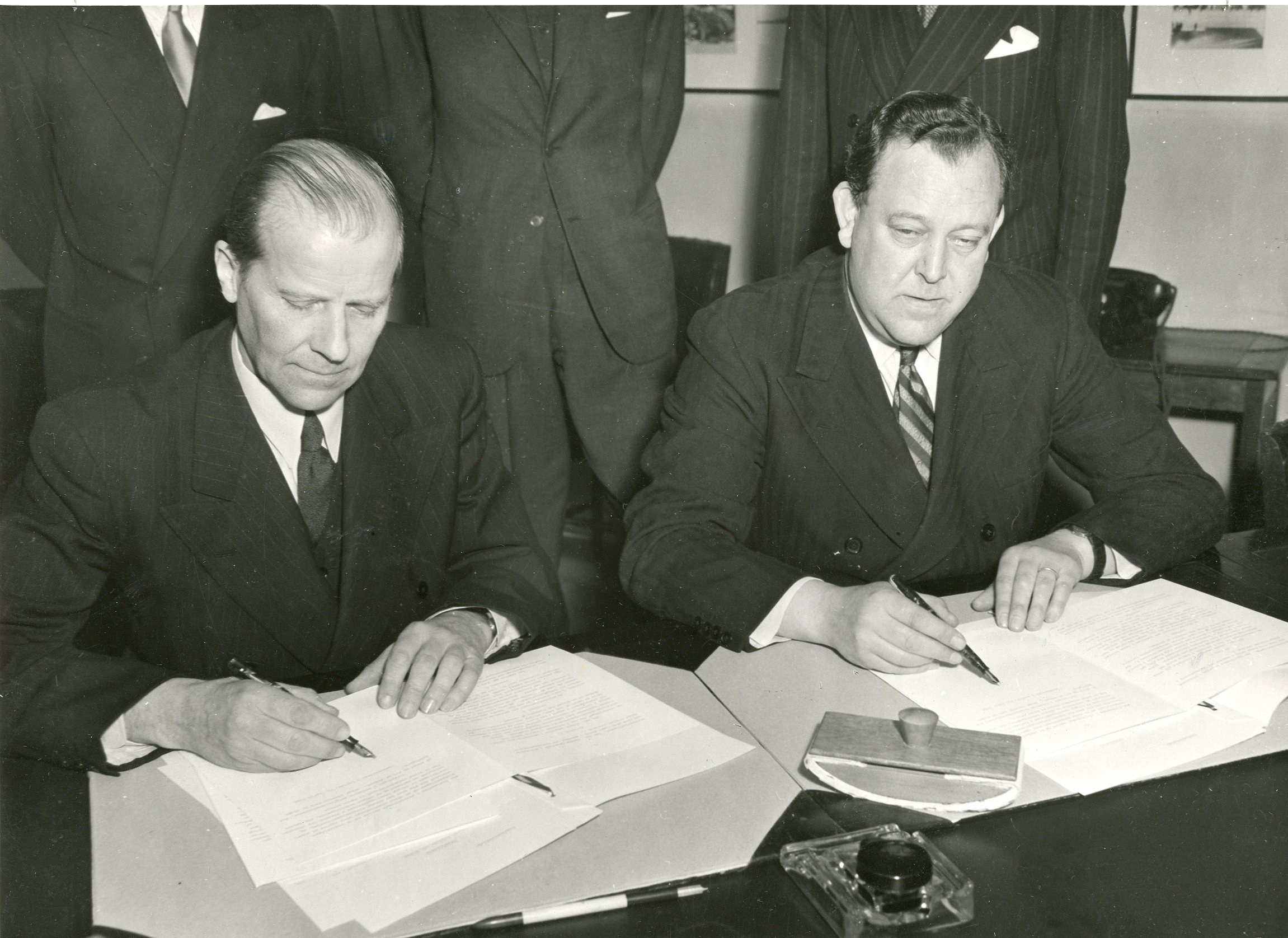
- Beck-Friis (left) with Norwegian foreign minister Trygve Lie in London in 1944.
- Born: Johan Hugo Beck-Friis; 5 June 1890; Stockholm, Sweden
- Died: 30 June 1969 (aged 79); Nacka, Sweden
- Education: Nya Elementar; Stockholm School of Economics
- Occupation: Diplomat
- Years active: 1912–1956
- Spouse: Gunilla Bielke (m. 1913)
- Children: 3

Baron Johan Hugo Beck-Friis (5 June 1890 – 30 June 1969) was a Swedish diplomat. Beck-Friis had a long career in Swedish diplomacy. He began as an attaché in Paris in 1912, later serving in Hamburg, Berlin, and Bern before advancing to legation secretary in various cities, including Paris and Bucharest. His career progressed with appointments in Washington, D.C., and as Consul General in Shanghai. During World War II, he served as envoy to Oslo, where he remained until the German occupation, and later represented Sweden to the Norwegian government-in-exile in London. In 1947, he became Sweden's first modern ambassador when the Swedish legation in Oslo was elevated to embassy status. He later served as envoy and ambassador to Rome before retiring in 1956. In 1959, as Dag Hammarskjöld's personal representative, he successfully mediated the resumption of diplomatic relations between Thailand and Cambodia. Beck-Friis also held numerous honorary positions, including chairman of several Swedish organizations, Grand Master of the Great Order of the Amaranth, and Chamberlain.

== Early life ==
Beck-Friis was born into the noble family Beck-Friis on 5 June 1890 in Stockholm, Sweden, the son of Baron Joachim Beck-Friis and Baroness Anna von Otter. His paternal grandfather was the officer, court marshal, and Member of Parliament Joachim Tawast Beck-Friis (1827–1888), and his maternal grandfather was Vice Admiral Carl Gustaf von Otter (1827–1900), who served as Sweden's Minister of Naval Defence from 1880 to 1892. Johan Hugo Beck-Friis had three siblings: one sister and twin brothers. His sister, Eva Ebba Gustava (1884–1963), married Admiral Fabian Tamm (1879–1955), who was Chief of the Navy from 1939 to 1945. His brother Carl Beck-Friis (1886–1969) was a conservative Member of Parliament, officer, and estate owner. The other brother, Ryttmästare Gustaf Joachim Beck-Friis (1886–1936), was CEO of the Swedish Farmers' Accident Insurance Company (Svenska Landbrukarnes Olycksfallsförsäkringsbolag).

He passed mogenhetsexamen at Nya Elementar in Stockholm on 19 May 1908, became a underlöjtnant in the Dalarna Regiment reserve on 30 December 1910, and was a student at Stockholm University College. He earned his Candidate of Law degree on 31 May 1912.

== Career ==
=== Diplomatic career ===
Beck-Friis became an assistant notary at the Svea Court of Appeal on 10 June 1912. He obtained an economics degree from the Stockholm School of Economics on 21 December 1912 and began serving at the Swedish legation in Paris on 20 August 1912. On 26 October 1912, he was appointed attaché (diplomatic trainee) at the Ministry for Foreign Affairs. He then served as attaché at the consulate general in Hamburg from 25 September 1913 and at the legation in Berlin starting 2 January 1914. After passing the diplomatic exam on 7 February 1917, he was appointed acting second secretary at the Ministry for Foreign Affairs on 9 February 1917 and promoted to acting first legation secretary on 26 March 1918. He also served as acting legation secretary in Bern beginning 20 June 1918.

Following his discharge from military service on 29 August 1919, he was appointed second legation secretary at the Ministry for Foreign Affairs on 12 September 1919. He later became the first legation secretary in Paris on 16 December 1919 and served as Sweden's observer at the International Congress of Intellectual Workers in Paris in 1923. His diplomatic career continued as first legation secretary in Bucharest, Athens, and Belgrade starting 16 October 1923. He was appointed chargé d'affaires ad interim in Athens on 11 November 1923 and later became the first legation secretary in Copenhagen on 28 June 1924.

In his diplomatic career, he became director (byråchef) at the Ministry for Foreign Affairs on 27 November 1925. From 1928 to 1930, he served as secretary to King Gustaf V during the king's foreign travels. On 1 July 1930, he was appointed legation counsellor at the legation in Washington, D.C. Later, on 18 January 1936, he became Consul General in Shanghai, where he also served as chargé d'affaires ad interim in China. On 28 November 1936, he was granted the title of minister. He was formally appointed envoy to China on 30 May 1937, a role he officially assumed on 1 July 1937. In 1939, he took on the position of acting head of Department B at the Ministry for Foreign Affairs in Stockholm.

He was appointed envoy to Oslo in January 1940. When the Germans occupied Oslo in April 1940, Beck-Friis remained in the city but was recalled in July of that year after the Germans demanded the closure of the legation. On 24 December 1940, he was appointed to temporarily head the mission in Lisbon. Beck-Friis became envoy in Lisbon, though his appointment as envoy to the Norwegian government was never revoked, and from the Swedish side, he continued to be regarded as accredited to them. In June 1943, he was sent to London, where he represented Sweden to the Norwegian government-in-exile. After Norway's liberation in 1945, he resumed his duties in Oslo. Many of Beck-Friis's reports have been published in Sweden's white papers on the country's policy during World War II.

In 1947, the first Swedish legation in the world was elevated to an embassy, located in Oslo, Norway. As a result, Beck-Friis became Sweden's first modern ambassador, following his promotion from envoy to ambassador. On 20 September that same year, during an audience with King Haakon VII, Beck-Friis presented his credentials as ambassador. He was appointed envoy to Rome in 1950 and became ambassador there in 1956, before retiring later that year. In 1959, as Dag Hammarskjöld's personal representative, he successfully persuaded Thailand and Cambodia to resume diplomatic relations. In 1960, he was appointed Chamberlain.

=== Other work ===
Beck-Friis became chairman of the Swedish Travellers Club in 1958, the Association of Men of 1890 (Föreningen 1890 års män) in 1958, and Stockholm's Rotary Club from 1959 to 1960. In 1961, he was appointed Grand Master of the Great Order of the Amaranth (Stora Amaranterorden) and was made an honorary member of the Pontifical Academy of Arcadia, as well as an honorary citizen of Pontecorvo, Italy. Additionally, in 1956, he was named an honorary member of the Circolo Scandinavo in Rome, the first person to be honored in the association's then 97-year history. In 1951, Beck-Friis became administrator of the Protestant Cemetery in Rome. He was appointed first sovereign and Grand Master of the Svea Orden in 1959, and was succeeded by Justice of the Supreme Administrative Court Hilding Björne in 1967.

== Personal life ==
On 26 August 1913 in Vists Church, Beck-Friis married Countess Gunilla Bielke (17 January 1893 at Slattefors in Landeryds socken, Östergötland – 6 December 1983), the daughter of underlöjtnant, Count Nils Bielke and Edith Maria Clementine Carleson.

They had three children: Ebba Gunilla Christina (born 12 January 1916 in Berlin), a son (born and died 20 October 1917 in Stockholm), and Jan (1930–2016).

== Death ==
Beck-Friis died on 30 June 1969 in Nacka Parish, Stockholm County. The funeral service took place on 11 July 1969 at Erstavik Chapel in Nacka Municipality.

== Awards and decorations ==
=== Swedish ===
- (Sweden) King Gustaf V's Jubilee Commemorative Medal (1928)
- (Sweden) King Gustaf V's Jubilee Commemorative Medal (1948)
- (Sweden) Commander Grand Cross of the Order of the Polar Star (15 November 1948)
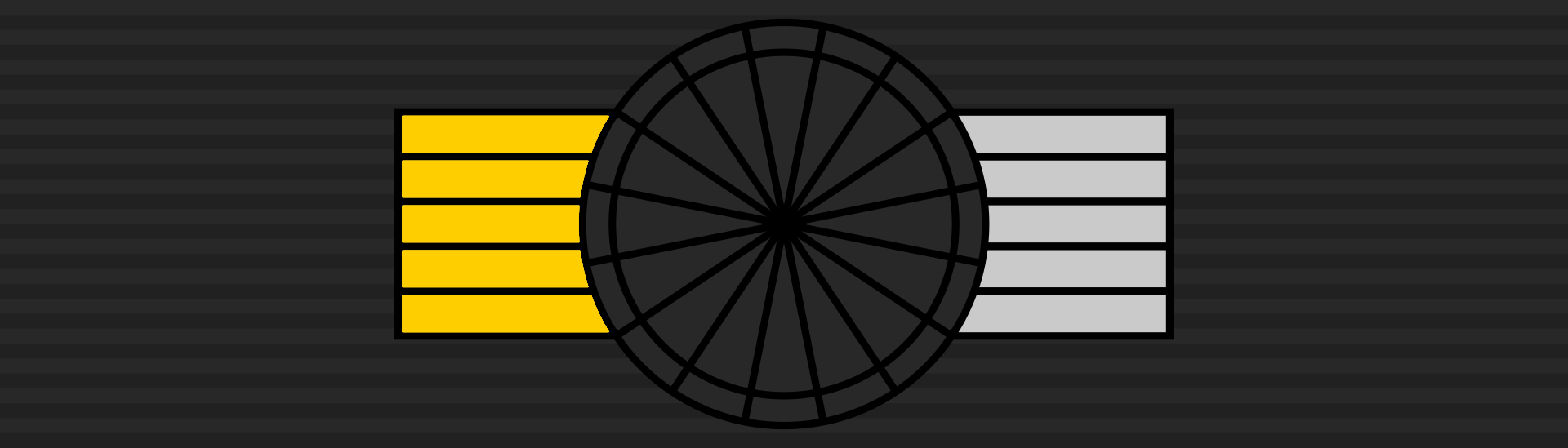
- (Sweden) Commander 1st Class of the Order of the Polar Star (6 June 1939)
- (Sweden) Knight of the Order of the Polar Star (10 December 1928)
- (Sweden) Knight of the Order of Charles XIII (1962)

=== Foreign ===
- (Belgium) Grand Cross of the Order of Leopold II (February 1947)
- (Belgium) Officer of the Order of Leopold II (before 1931)
- (Belgium) Officer of the Order of Leopold (5 March 1923)
- (Bulgaria) Commander of the Order of Civil Merit (before 1931)
- Grand Cross of the Order of the Lion of Finland (before 1950)
- (France) Officer of the Legion of Honour (before 1931)
- (France) Knight of the Legion of Honour (24 March 1923)
- (Greece) Commander of the Order of the Redeemer (before 1931)
- (Greece) Grand Cross of the Order of the Phoenix (before 1940)
- (Italy) 1st Class / Knight Grand Cross of the Order of Merit of the Italian Republic (17 March 1956)
- (Italy) Commander of the Order of Saints Maurice and Lazarus (before 1931)
- (Taiwan) Grand Cross of the Order of Brilliant Jade (before 1942)
- (Latvia) Grand Cross of the Order of the Three Stars (before 1942)
- (Lithuania) Grand Cross of the Order of the Lithuanian Grand Duke Gediminas (before 1942)
- (Mexico) Sash of the Order of the Aztec Eagle (5 May 1949)
- (Monaco) Grand Officer of the Order of Saint Charles (before 1931)
- (Netherlands) Grand Cross of the Order of Orange-Nassau (before 1947)
- (Norway) Grand Cross of the Order of St. Olav (before 1947)
- (Portugal) Grand Cross of the Military Order of Christ (2 February 1944)
- (Kingdom of Prussia) Knight 3rd Class of the Order of the Red Eagle (June 1918)
- (Kingdom of Prussia) Knight 4th Class of the Order of the Crown (10 October 1916)
- (Kingdom of Prussia) Red Cross Medal, 2nd and 3rd Class (1918)
- (Vatican City) Grand Officer of the Order of St. Gregory the Great (before 1931)
- (Kingdom of Romania) Grand Officer of the Order of the Crown of Romania (before 1931)
- (Kingdom of Serbia) Commander of the Order of St. Sava (before 1931)
- (Thailand) Grand Cross of the Order of the White Elephant (before 1962)
- (Kingdom of Hungary) Grand Cross of the Hungarian Order of Merit (before 1945)
- (Austria-Hungary) Decoration for Services to the Red Cross, 2nd Class with war decoration (12 March 1921)
- (Austria-Hungary) Decoration for Services to the Red Cross, Officers Cross with war decoration (15 December 1921)

== Bibliography ==
- Beck-Friis, Johan (1956). Protestantiska kyrkogården i Rom: konstnärernas och poeternas kyrkogård [The Protestant cemetery of Rome: the cemetery of artists and poets] (in Swedish). Malmö: Allhem. SELIBR 1034710.
- Beck-Friis, Johan (1956). Il cimitero acattolico di Roma: il cimitero degli artisti e dei poeti [The Non-Catholic Cemetery of Rome: The Cemetery of Artists and Poets] (in Italian). Malmö: Allhem. SELIBR 1034711.
- Beck-Friis, Johan (1956). The Protestant cemetery in Rome: the cemetery of artists and poets. Malmö: Allhem. SELIBR 1034715.
- Beck-Friis, Johan (1956). Der protestantische Friedhof in Rom: Friedhof der Dichter, Denker und Künstler [The Protestant Cemetery in Rome: Cemetery of poets, thinkers and artists] (in German). Malmö: Allhem. SELIBR 1034719.
- Beck-Friis, Johan (1921). Möjligheten: roman [The possibility: novel] (in Swedish). Stockholm: Åhlen & Åkerlund. SELIBR 1469910.
- Beck-Friis, Johan (1914). Försvarsfrågans praktiska lösning: Politiskt föredrag i Falköping den 15 Mars 1914 [The practical solution to the defense question: Political lecture in Falköping on 15 March 1914] (in Swedish). Falköping: Falköpings tidning. SELIBR 1631219.

Diplomatic posts
| Preceded by Einar Lindquist | Consul General of Sweden to Shanghai; 1936–1937 | Succeeded by None |
| Preceded by Himself as Chargé d'affaires ad interim | Envoy of Sweden to China; 1937–1939 | Succeeded by Erik Kronvall as Chargé d'affaires ad interim |
| Preceded by Christian Günther | Envoy/Ambassador of Sweden to Norway; 1940–1950 | Succeeded by Hans Wilhelmsson Ahlmann |
| Preceded by Leif Öhrvall as Chargé d'affaires | Envoy of Sweden to Portugal; 1941–1943 | Succeeded by Gustaf Weidel |
| Preceded by Christian Günther | Envoy/Ambassador of Sweden to Italy; 1950–1956 | Succeeded by Eric von Post |
