= Circolo Scandinavo =

The Scandinavian Association for Artists and Scientists, in Italian Circolo Scandinavo per Artisti e Scienziati and in Swedish officially known as Skandinaviska föreningen för konstnärer och vetenskapsmän eller Skandinaviska föreningens konstnärshus i Rom is an association and artists residency located in Trastevere, Rome, providing short-term residencies for Nordic artists.

== History ==
Circolo Scandinavo was founded by Scandinavian artists in Rome in July 1860, when the Danish, Swedish and Norwegian libraries in Rome united to create a space for their countrymen in Italy. There was a strong Nordic presence, starting with the sculptor Thorvaldsen, and the Danish library had been established in 1833.

The first location of the association was in the now demolished Palazzo Correa next to the Mausoleum of Augustus, and has had 12 different locations since. Between the late 19th century to the Second World War, Circolo Scandinavo was visited by many of the greatest artists in Scandinavian history, including Henrik Ibsen, Carl Bloch, Selma Lagerlöf and Sigrid Undset.

Henrik Ibsen was one of the more active members of the 1870s, and is credited for opening the association to women. In 1879, while working on A Doll's House, he protested against women not being allowed as members of the association, and in 1882, Circolo was opened to women as well.

Circolo Scandinavo was more like a meeting point for Scandinavians than it was a working space until the end of the Second World War. In 1962, the association started a residency programme, and in 1975 was transformed exclusively into an artists residency. This was done with financial help from the Nordic Council of Ministers, which is still today the main sponsor of Circolo Scandinavo.

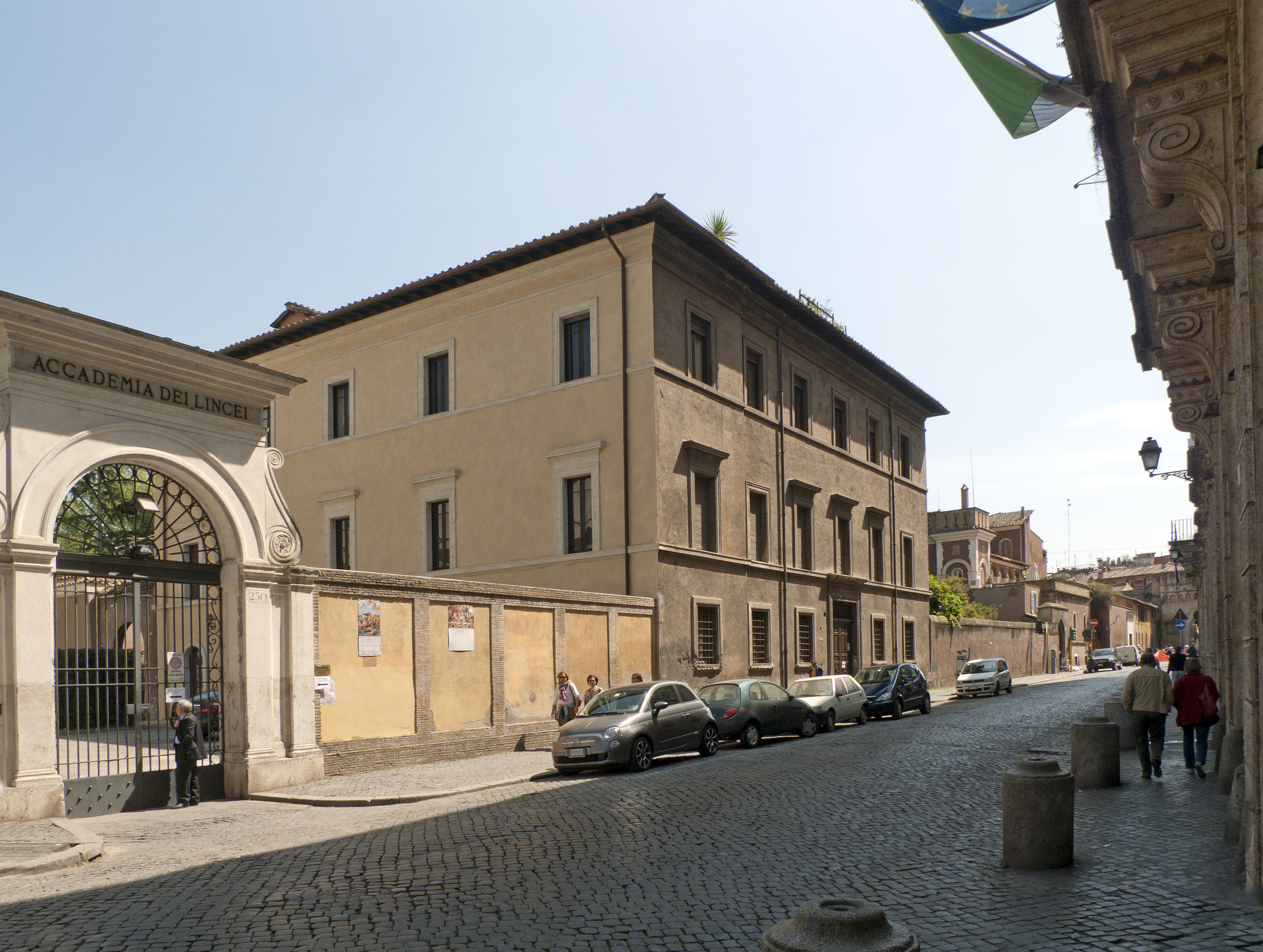
The Casino Farnese where Circolo Scandinavo is located.

=== Notable guests ===
- Bjørnstjerne Bjørnson
- Carl Bloch
- Edvard Grieg
- Henrik Ibsen
- Jens Peter Jacobsen
- Selma Lagerlöf
- Walter Runeberg
- August Strindberg
- Evert Taube
- Sigrid Undset

== Circolo in the 21st century ==
The main purpose for the association is to provide artists from the five Nordic countries with a place to work in Rome. The artists granted residency are determined through an application process. Each year over 300 artists from all the Nordic countries apply for residency and about 60 artists each year get a residency. The residencies are usually one or two months. The artists come from every discipline of art.

The association is also an active player in Roman cultural life. It arranges events with Nordic artists, and participate in mainly Nordic themed events in Rome. Alongside the Nordic embassies of Rome, Circolo arranges the Nordic Film Fest, a film festival held every spring. The Director of Circolo Scandinavo from 2012 to 2020 was Ingo Arnason an Icelandic theatre and opera director. From September 2020 onwards the Director of Circolo Scandinavo is Marie Kraft, a Swedish architect.

== Casino Farnese ==
Circolo Scandinavo currently resides in a renaissance palace in Trastevere, next to Palazzo Corsini and Villa Farnesina, called Casino di Vigna or Casino Farnese, after the Farnese family. The area was developed in the end of the 15th century on the slopes of the Tiber where Julius Caesar's vineyards were situated.

The Casino is a three-story palace owned by the Lincean Academy, where Circolo occupies the top floor.
