= Treaty of Canton =

1847 treaty between China and Sweden-Norway

Treaty of Peace, Amity, and Commerce between the King of Sweden and Norway and the Empire of China
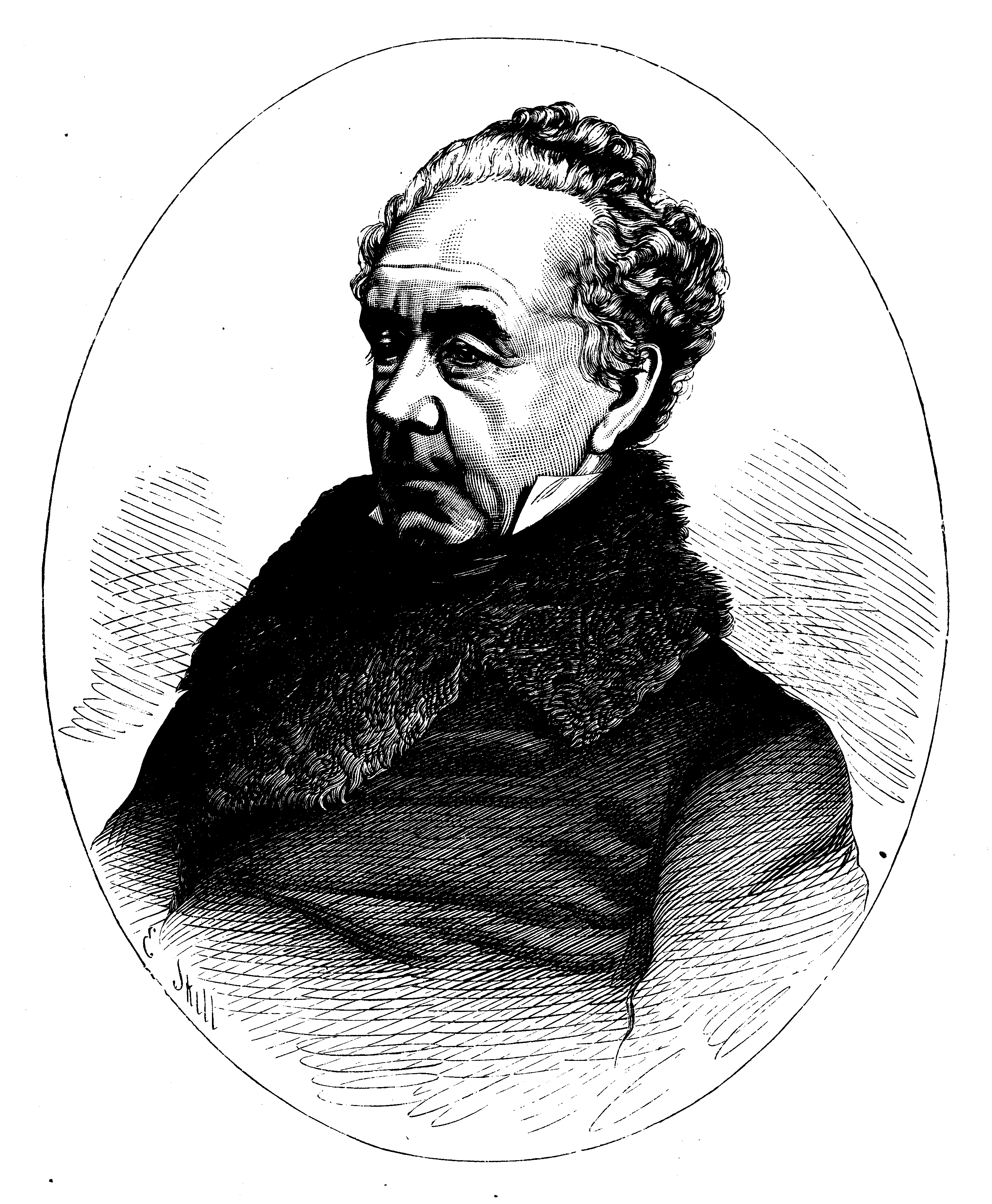
- Type: Bilateral
- Signed: March 20, 1847
- Effective: October 28, 1847
- Parties: China and Sweden-Norway
- Languages: Swedish and Chinese

Full text at Wikisource
- sv:Fördraget i Kanton; zh:中瑞挪廣州和約貿易章程

The Treaty of Canton (Chinese: 中瑞廣州條約, Swedish: Fördraget i Kanton) was the first unequal treaty between Sweden-Norway and the Chinese Empire. The treaty was negotiated in March 1847 by Carl Fredrik Liljevalch and Qiying, the Viceroy of Liangguang, and was one of the unequal treaties between Western powers and China that followed the First Opium War.

The treaty was actually never ratified by Chinese representatives, which cast a shadow over the legality of the outcome, but nevertheless went into effect, lasting the following 60 years.

== Provisions ==
Its terms, similar to the 1844 Treaty of Wanghia between the United States and China, provided that Sweden-Norway would have the same privileges in China as other treaty powers, so-called most-favored-nation status. Like the United States and British Empire before it, commercial access was granted to the five treaty ports of Canton (Guangzhou), Amoy, Fuzhou, Ningbo and Shanghai. This was in stark contrast to previous Western relations with China, when only Canton was open for foreign trade.

Like other Western countries, extraterritorial rights was given to Sweden-Norway; jurisdiction over citizens of Sweden and Norway in the treaty ports was transferred from China to Sweden-Norway. The treaty furthermore allowed Sweden-Norway to send consuls to China, and to have its commerce being subjected to fixed tariffs only. The provisions of the treaty remained in force until the twentieth century, with a new treaty being negotiated in 1908 by Gustav Oscar Wallenberg, three years after the dissolution of Sweden-Norway.

== See also ==
- Unequal treaties
- Treaty port
