= Shanghai Jinjiang Hotel =

Hotel in Huangpu, Shanghai, China

Coordinates: 31°13′17.4″N 121°27′24″E

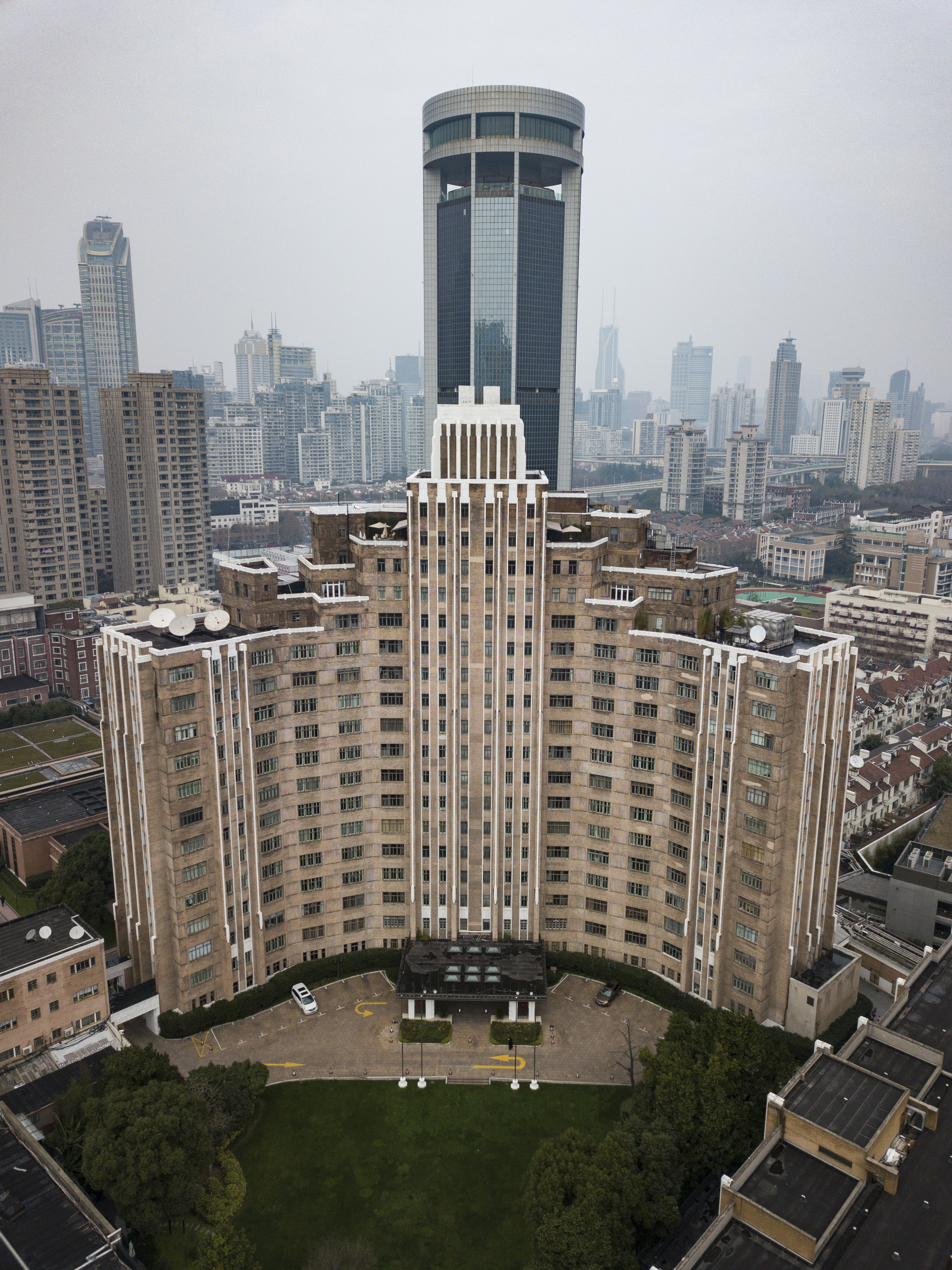
Former Grosvenor House, Aerial view.

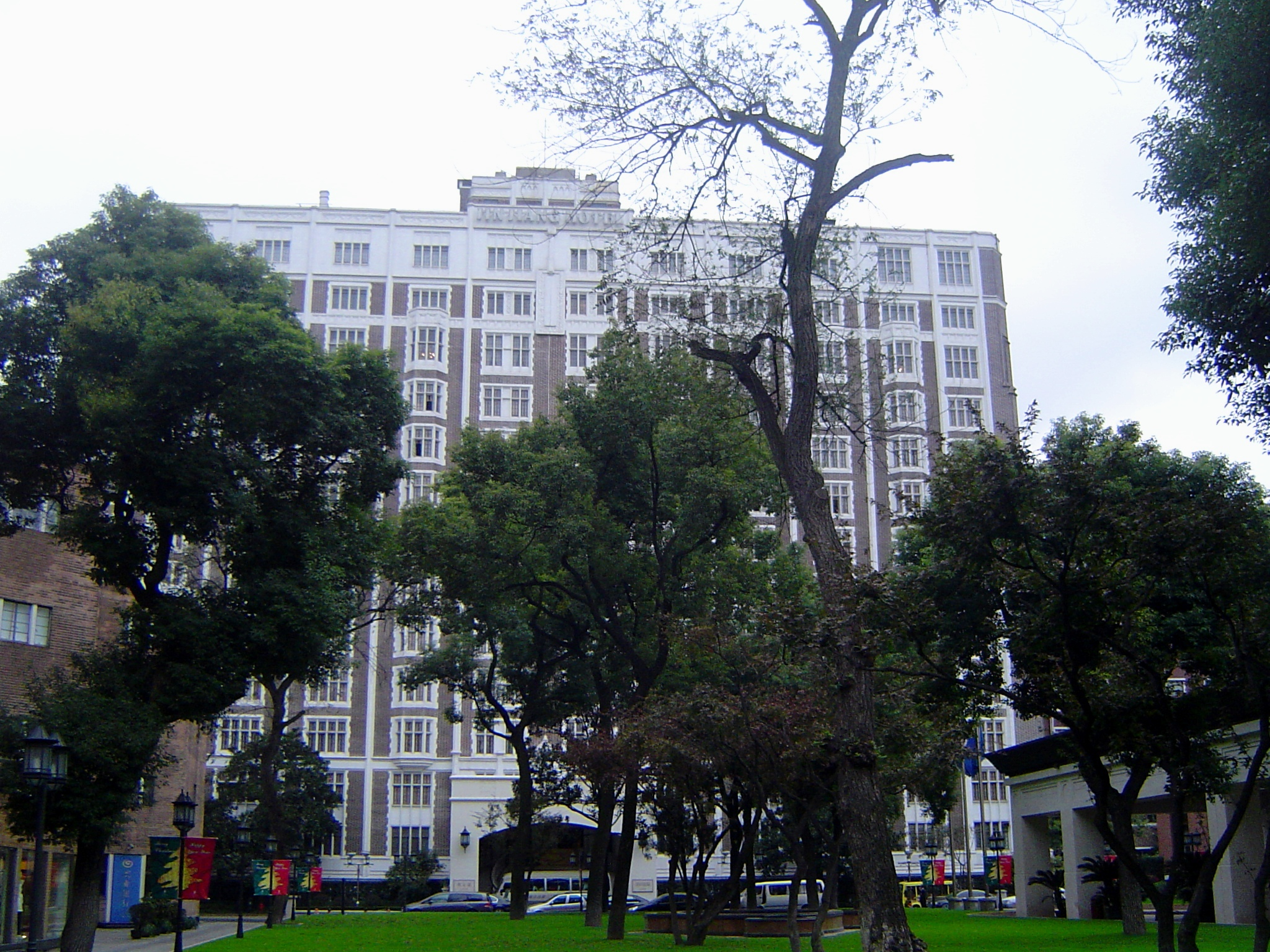
The former Cathay Mansion, now one of the two main buildings of Jinjiang Hotel, viewed from inside the hotel grounds.

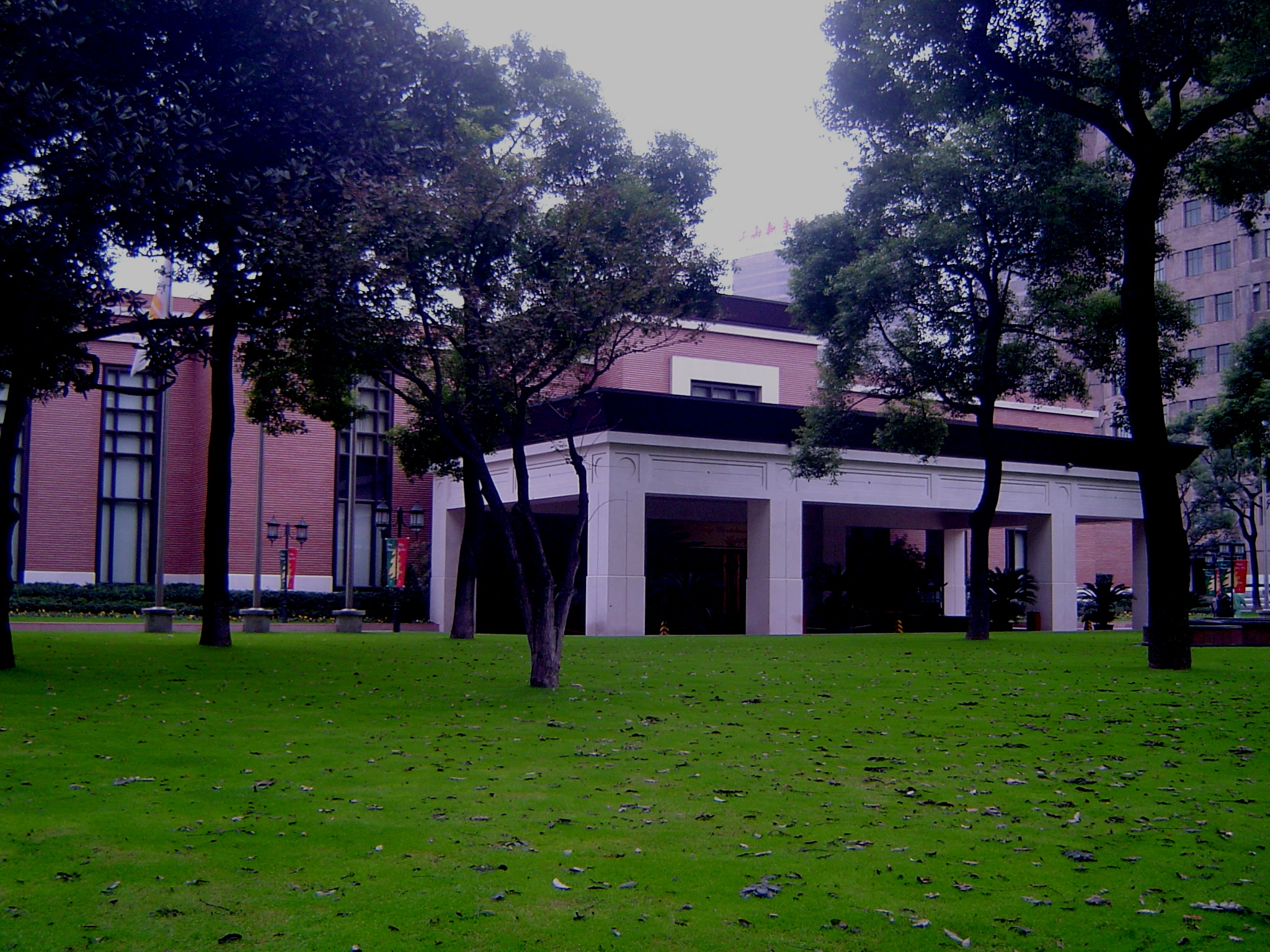
Hall at Jinjiang Hotel, site of the signing of the Shanghai Communique normalising Sino-American relations.

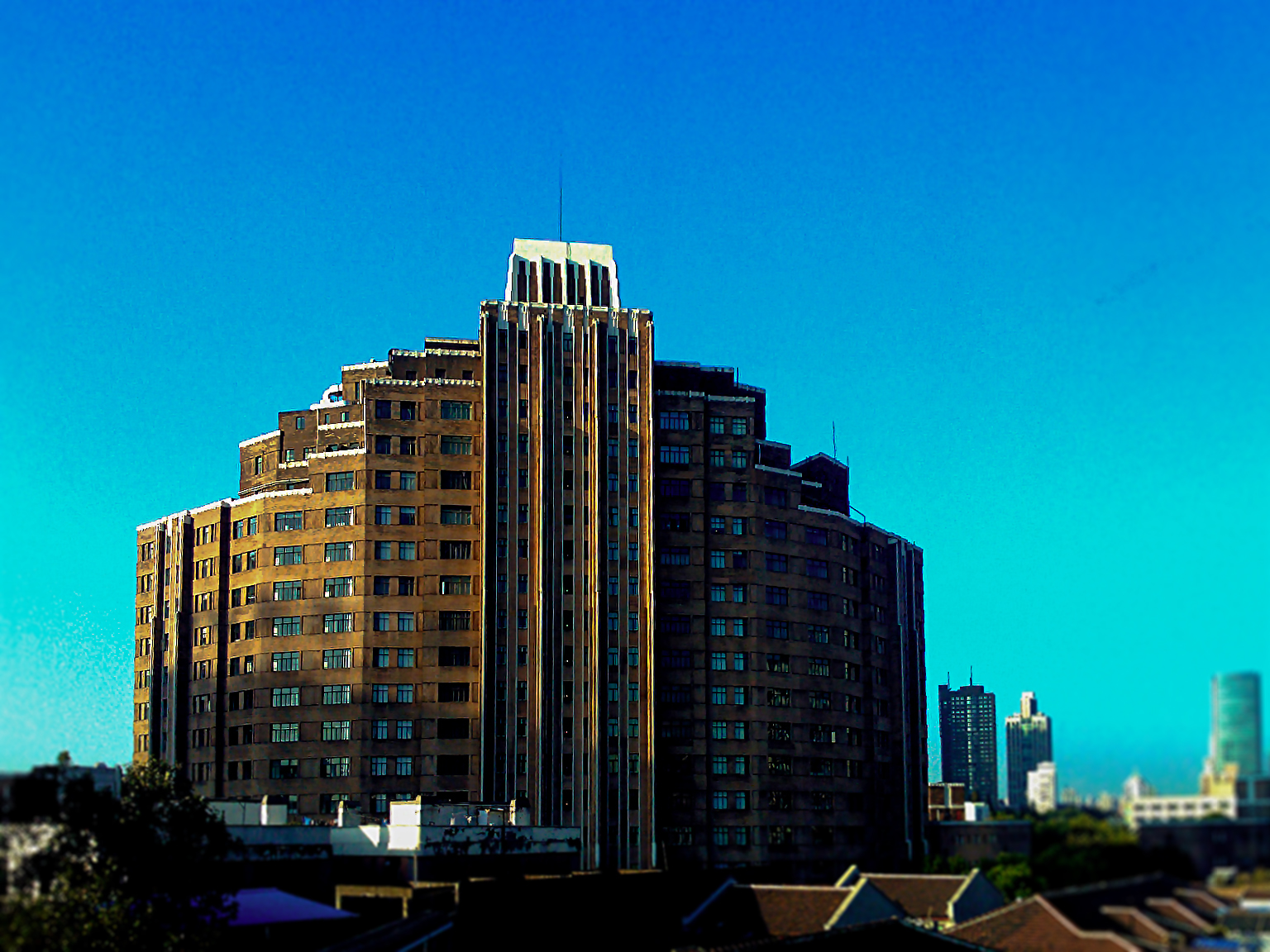
The former Grosvenor House, now one of the two main buildings of Jinjiang Hotel.

Shanghai Jinjiang Hotel (上海锦江饭店) is a for-profit hotel in Huangpu, Shanghai, China. The hotel is operated by Jin Jiang International (Holdings) Co., Ltd.

The main part of the hotel comprises two early 20th century apartment buildings, set around two lawns. The hotel contains 515 guest rooms, which include both modern facilities and traditional furniture and decor. The hotel covers an area of about 30,000 square metres, of which 10,000 square metres are covered with green leisure space, flowers, and trees. The hotel was renovated in 2004.

== History ==
On March 15, 1935, Dong Zhujun opened Jinjiang Sichuan Restaurant on Huage Road (now Ninghai West Road) and the Jinjiang Tea House on Hualong Road (now Yandang Road) the next year, famous for its female waitresses. In 1951, the Shanghai Municipal People's Government arranged for Jinjiang Sichuan Restaurant and Jinjiang Tea House to move into the former Cathay Mansions and be renamed Jinjiang Hotel and operate as a state guesthouse for entertaining senior cadres and foreign guests. Since then, it has received more than 400 heads of state and government leaders.

When Nixon visited China in 1972, the US delegation stayed at the Jinjiang Hotel. The Shanghai Communiqué, which marked the normalization of relations between China and the United States, was also signed and issued in the small auditorium of the Jinjiang Hotel built in 1957

The Jinjiang Hotel comprises two historic buildings, originally high-end properties developed by Victor Sassoon.

- Cathay Mansions (Huamao Apartments), no. 175 Changle Road, is a 13-story Tudor style apartment/hotel building built in 1929, designed by Palmer & Turner. It was one of the first skyscrapers in Shanghai.
- The Grosvenor House (Junling Jilu) was completed in 1934, designed by Palmer & Turner in bold Art Deco style, and with 18 stories was the tallest in Shanghai. It included accommodation for British officials. In 1956 it was renamed Maoming Apartment. There is a lower three-storey annex along Maoming South Road.

== Awards and recognition ==
As a representative of the state of "Chinese culinary artistry", the hotel's cuisine was highly praised by a New York Times reporter, proving that the China's cuisine is returning to its "glory days".

The catering service department of Jinjiang Grand Hall gained the honor of "Advanced Group of National Travel Industry" and made a speech as the only representative from Shanghai (a total of six were chosen in China) in the Great Hall of the People in Beijing.
