= Foreign relations of Sweden =

The foreign policy of Sweden was formerly based on the premise that national security is best served by staying free of alliances in peacetime in order to remain a neutral country in the event of war, with this policy lasting from 1814 in the context of the French Revolutionary and Napoleonic Wars until the 2022 Russian Invasion of Ukraine. In 2002, Sweden revised its security doctrine. The security doctrine at that point still stated that "Sweden pursues a policy of non-participation in military alliances," but permitted cooperation in response to threats against peace and security. The government also seeks to maintain Sweden's high standard of living. These two objectives required heavy expenditures for social welfare, defence spending at rates considered low by Western European standards (around 1.2% of GNP prior to 2022), and close attention to foreign trade opportunities and world economic cooperation. In 2024, Sweden formally became part of a military alliance for the first time since the end of the War of the Sixth Coalition by joining NATO.

== United Nations ==
Sweden has been a member of the United Nations since November 19, 1946, and participates actively in the activities of the organization, including as an elected member of the Security Council (1957–1958, 1975–1976, 1997–1998 and 2017–2018), providing Dag Hammarskjöld as the second elected Secretary-General of the UN, etc. The strong interest of the Swedish Government and people in international cooperation and peacemaking has been supplemented in the early 1980s by renewed attention to Nordic and European security questions.

Sweden decided not to sign the Treaty on the Prohibition of Nuclear Weapons.

== European Union ==
EU members in 1995 Sweden, Austria and Finland

After the then Prime Minister Ingvar Carlsson had submitted Sweden's application in July 1991 the negotiations began in February 1993. Finally, on January 1, 1995, Sweden became a member of the European Union. While some argued that it went against Sweden's historic policy of neutrality, where Sweden had not joined during the Cold War because it was seen as incompatible with neutrality, others viewed the move as a natural extension of the economic cooperation that had been going on since 1972 with the EU. Sweden addressed this controversy by reserving the right not to participate in any future EU defence alliance. In membership negotiations in 1993–1994, Sweden also had reserved the right to make the final decision on whether to join the third stage of the EMU "in light of continued developments." In a nationwide referendum in November 1994, 52.3 percent of participants voted in favour of EU membership. Voter turnout was high, 83.3 percent of the eligible voters voted. The main Swedish concerns included winning popular support for EU cooperation, EU enlargement, and strengthening the EU in areas such as economic growth, job promotion, and environmental issues.

In polls taken a few years after the referendum, many Swedes indicated that they were unhappy with Sweden's membership in the EU. However, after Sweden successfully hosted its first presidency of the EU in the first half of 2001, most Swedes today have a more positive attitude towards the EU. The government, with the support of the Center Party, decided in spring 1997 to remain outside of the EMU, at least until 2002. A referendum was held on September 14, 2003. The results were 55.9% for no, 42.0% yes and 2.1% giving no answer ("blank vote").

== Nordic Council ==
Swedish foreign policy has been the result of a wide consensus. Sweden cooperates closely with its Nordic neighbors, formally in economic and social matters through the Nordic Council of Ministers and informally in political matters through direct consultation.

== Nonalignment ==
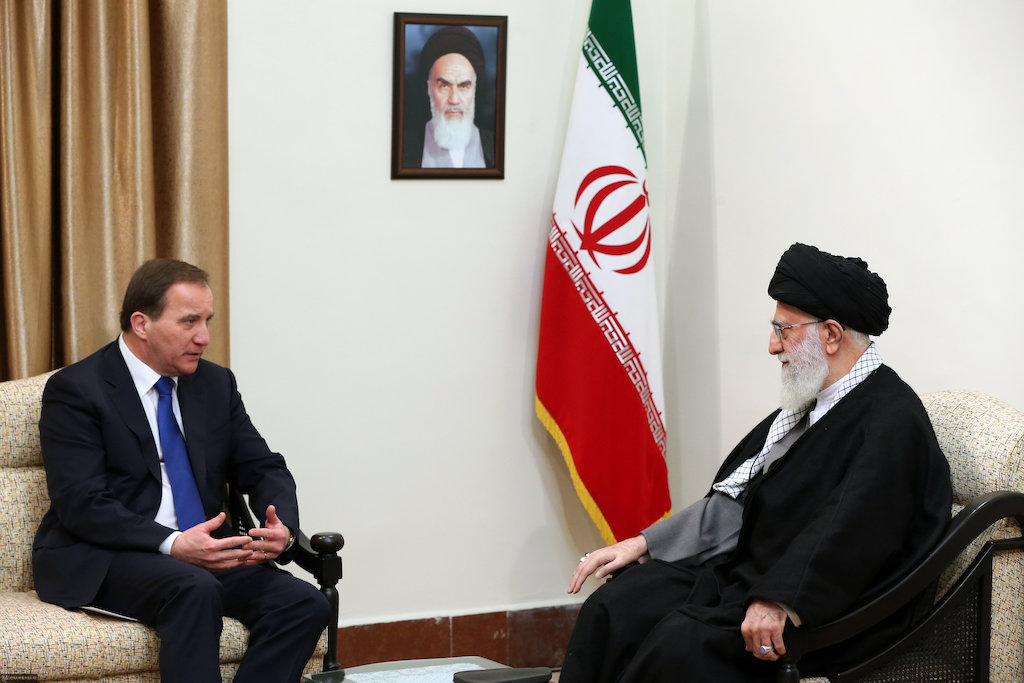
Swedish Prime Minister Stefan Löfven with Iranian Supreme Leader Ali Khamenei, February 11, 2017

Swedish neutrality and nonalignment policy in peacetime may partly explain how the country could stay out of wars since 1814. Swedish governments have not defined nonalignment as precluding outspoken positions in international affairs. Government leaders have favored national liberation movements that enjoy broad support among developing world countries, with notable attention to Africa. During the Cold War, Sweden was suspicious of the superpowers, which it saw as making decisions affecting small countries without always consulting those countries. With the end of the Cold War, that suspicion has lessened somewhat, although Sweden still chooses to remain nonaligned. Sweden has devoted particular attention to issues of disarmament, arms control, and nuclear nonproliferation and has contributed importantly to UN and other international peacekeeping efforts, including the NATO-led peacekeeping forces in the Balkans. It sat as an observer in the Western European Union from 1995 to 2011, but it is not an active member of NATO's Partnership for Peace and the Euro-Atlantic Partnership Council.

Sweden's engagement with NATO was especially strengthened during the term of Anders Fogh Rasmussen.

Sweden's nonalignment policy has led it to serve as the protecting power for a number of nations who don't have formal diplomatic relations with each other for various reasons. It currently represents the United States, Canada, and several Western European nations in North Korea for consular matters. On several occasions when the United Kingdom broke off relations with Iran (including the 1979 Iranian Revolution, the Salman Rushdie affair, and the 2011 storming of the British embassy in Tehran), Sweden served as the protecting power for the UK.

In May 2022, Sweden formally applied to join the NATO alliance. The public opinion in the Nordic region had changed in favour of joining NATO since Russia's invasion of Ukraine on February 24 of the same year.

Russian Foreign Ministry spokeswoman Maria Zakharova said in March 2022 that her government would have to respond if Sweden became a NATO member. However, in June 2022 President Vladimir Putin contradicted the statement, claiming that Sweden and Finland can "join whatever they want" on the condition that there will be no NATO military deployment in either country.

In March 2024, Sweden officially ended this period of nonalignment when it joined NATO.

== Military ==
Sweden has employed its military on numerous occasions since the end of the Cold War, from Bosnia and Congo to Afghanistan and Libya. According to one study, "this military activism is driven both by the Swedish internationalist tradition of "doing good" in the world, but also for instrumental purposes. These include a desire for political influence in international institutions, an interest in collective milieu shaping, and a concern to improve the interoperability and effectiveness of the Swedish military."

== Participation in international organizations ==
- AfDB
- Amnesty International
- AsDB
- Australia Group
- BIS
- CBSS
- CERN
- Council of Europe
- EAPC
- EBRD
- ECE
- EIB
- ESA
- EU
- FAO
- G-9
- G-10
- IADB
- IAEA
- IBRD
- ICAO
- ICC
- ICCt
- ICRM
- IDA
- IEA
- IFAD
- IFC
- IFRCS
- IHO
- ILO
- IMF
- IMO
- Inmarsat
- Intelsat
- Interpol
- IOC
- IOM
- ISO
- ITU
- ITUC
- MINURSO
- NAC
- NATO
- NEA
- NIB
- Nordic Council
- NSG
- OECD
- OPCW
- OSCE
- PCA
- PFP
- Transport Community
- UN
- UNCTAD
- UNEP
- UNESCO
- UNHCR
- UNHRC
- UNIDO
- UNIKOM
- UNITAR
- UNMEE
- UNMIBH
- UNMIK
- UNMOGIP
- UNMOP
- UNOMIG
- UNTAET
- UNTSO
- UPU
- WCO
- WEU (observer)
- WFP
- WFTU
- WHO
- WIPO
- WMO
- WTrO
- Zangger Committee

=== Multilateral ===
Organization	Formal relations began	Notes
European Union		See 1995 enlargement of the European Union Sweden joined the European Union as a full member on 1 January 1995.
NATO		See Sweden–NATO relations Sweden joined NATO as a full member on 7 March 2024.

== Diplomatic relations ==
List of countries which Sweden maintains diplomatic relations with:

#	Country	Date
1	Denmark	6 June 1523
2	France	October 1541
3	Spain	29 June 1578
4	Netherlands	5 May 1614
5	Portugal	10 June 1641
6	United Kingdom	23 December 1653
7	Russia	15 March 1722
8	United States	29 April 1818
9	Brazil	5 January 1826
10	Greece	5 February 1833
11	Belgium	25 February 1837
12	Venezuela	5 September 1839
13	Argentina	3 January 1846
14	Italy	27 March 1862
15	Japan	11 January 1868
16	Thailand	18 May 1868
17	Colombia	11 December 1874
18	El Salvador	1 October 1876
19	Mexico	29 July 1885
20	Chile	14 June 1895
21	Iran	5 September 1897
22	Cuba	30 September 1902
23	Norway	18 November 1905
24	Uruguay	6 August 1906
25	Bulgaria	6 July 1914
26	Switzerland	3 September 1915
27	Romania	18 March 1916
28	Serbia	1 November 1917
29	Finland	10 January 1918
30	Poland	2 August 1919
31	Austria	10 January 1920
32	Hungary	12 November 1920
33	Czech Republic	20 November 1920
34	Egypt	25 November 1922
35	Luxembourg	25 January 1923
36	Paraguay	24 February 1923
37	Turkey	1 August 1925
38	Guatemala	9 December 1930
39	Peru	1 January 1931
40	Ecuador	21 September 1931
41	Bolivia	2 February 1932
42	Iraq	18 May 1934
43	South Africa	30 November 1934
44	Honduras	10 January 1936
45	Nicaragua	10 January 1936
46	Panama	3 July 1937
47	Costa Rica	26 November 1937
48	Iceland	27 July 1940
49	Afghanistan	22 November 1940
50	Haiti	31 March 1941
51	Dominican Republic	16 July 1942
52	Canada	2 July 1943
53	Ethiopia	27 December 1945
54	Lebanon	7 February 1946
55	Ireland	28 June 1946
56	Philippines	17 January 1947
57	Syria	24 June 1947
58	Australia	24 September 1947
59	India	22 June 1948
60	New Zealand	9 July 1949
61	Pakistan	25 October 1949
62	Sri Lanka	18 November 1949
63	China	9 May 1950
64	Israel	4 November 1950
65	Indonesia	23 November 1950
66	Germany	4 April 1951
67	Myanmar	22 February 1956
68	Saudi Arabia	28 June 1957
69	Sudan	27 October 1957
70	Jordan	14 December 1957
71	Liberia	6 June 1958
72	Malaysia	6 June 1958
73	Morocco	23 July 1958
74	Tunisia	14 October 1958
75	South Korea	11 March 1959
76	Nepal	10 June 1960
77	Somalia	13 July 1960
78	Libya	25 August 1960
79	Cyprus	12 December 1960
80	Cambodia	18 January 1961
81	Senegal	8 May 1961
82	Madagascar	17 August 1961
83	Nigeria	3 October 1961
84	Benin	21 November 1961
85	Sierra Leone	13 December 1961
86	Ghana	27 April 1962
87	Republic of the Congo	27 September 1962
88	Democratic Republic of the Congo	October 1962
89	Guinea	26 November 1962
90	Algeria	20 April 1963
91	Ivory Coast	5 June 1963
92	Kenya	January 1964
93	Uganda	9 April 1964
94	Tanzania	29 May 1964
95	Mongolia	30 June 1964
96	Laos	10 October 1964
97	Zambia	27 November 1964
98	Kuwait	22 December 1964
99	Burkina Faso	1964
100	Rwanda	1964
101	Mali	25 January 1965
102	Niger	26 May 1965
103	Gabon	May 1965
104	Cameroon	24 September 1965
105	Burundi	7 December 1965
106	Singapore	8 February 1966
107	Malawi	31 March 1966
108	Trinidad and Tobago	July 1966
109	Botswana	21 March 1968
110	Lesotho	29 May 1968
111	Gambia	1968
112	Vietnam	11 January 1969
113	Albania	20 June 1969
114	Malta	June 1969
115	Equatorial Guinea	1969
116	Yemen	29 September 1970
117	Mauritania	14 December 1970
118	Bangladesh	12 April 1972
119	United Arab Emirates	1972
120	Qatar	29 March 1973
121	North Korea	7 April 1973
122	Mauritius	20 December 1973
123	Eswatini	1973
124	Tonga	21 January 1974
125	Jamaica	5 February 1974
126	Bahrain	25 February 1974
127	Oman	15 March 1974
128	Grenada	15 February 1975
129	Guinea-Bissau	14 March 1975
130	Guyana	16 June 1975
131	Mozambique	25 June 1975
132	Barbados	19 March 1976
133	Angola	1 September 1976
134	Papua New Guinea	10 November 1976
135	Cape Verde	4 December 1976
136	Comoros	1977
137	Samoa	1977
138	São Tomé and Príncipe	1977
139	Suriname	15 March 1978
140	Togo	15 March 1978
141	Bahamas	9 May 1978
142	Maldives	21 August 1978
143	Fiji	3 April 1979
144	Seychelles	14 August 1979
145	Solomon Islands	24 October 1979
146	Djibouti	20 February 1980
147	Zimbabwe	18 April 1980
148	Vanuatu	27 September 1981
149	Saint Lucia	September 1981
150	Antigua and Barbuda	11 June 1982
—	Holy See	2 August 1982
151	Belize	17 November 1982
152	Central African Republic	1983
153	Dominica	3 May 1984
154	Brunei	1984
155	Bhutan	27 August 1985
156	San Marino	13 December 1988
157	Namibia	21 March 1990
158	Estonia	28 August 1991
159	Latvia	28 August 1991
160	Lithuania	28 August 1991
161	Liechtenstein	24 October 1991
162	Ukraine	13 January 1992
163	Belarus	14 January 1992
164	Croatia	29 January 1992
165	Slovenia	29 January 1992
166	Marshall Islands	12 February 1992
167	Kyrgyzstan	25 March 1992
168	Saint Vincent and the Grenadines	2 April 1992
169	Saint Kitts and Nevis	3 April 1992
170	Kazakhstan	7 April 1992
171	Uzbekistan	8 April 1992
172	Turkmenistan	10 April 1992
173	Azerbaijan	8 May 1992
174	Moldova	12 June 1992
175	Armenia	10 July 1992
176	Federated States of Micronesia	26 August 1992
177	Georgia	19 September 1992
178	Tajikistan	9 December 1992
179	Bosnia and Herzegovina	11 December 1992
180	Slovakia	1 January 1993
181	Eritrea	24 June 1993
182	North Macedonia	20 December 1993
183	Andorra	16 March 1995
184	Chad	3 August 1995
185	Palau	9 August 1995
186	Timor-Leste	20 May 2002
187	Montenegro	26 June 2006
—	Kosovo	28 March 2008
188	Monaco	30 January 2009
189	South Sudan	9 July 2011
190	Tuvalu	24 August 2012
191	Kiribati	28 September 2012
192	Nauru	28 September 2012
—	State of Palestine	30 October 2014

== Africa ==
Region	Formal relations began	Notes
Egypt	25 November 1922	Both countries established diplomatic relations on 25 November 1922 when Harald Bildt took up the post of first Swedish Minister to Egypt.: Egypt has an embassy in Stockholm.; Sweden has an embassy in Cairo.
Mozambique	25 June 1975	Both countries established diplomatic relations on 25 June 1975.: Mozambique has an embassy in Stockholm.; Sweden has an embassy in Maputo.
Nigeria	3 October 1961	Both countries established diplomatic relations on 3 October 1961.: Nigeria has an embassy in Stockholm.; Sweden has an embassy in Abuja.
South Africa		See South Africa-Sweden relations: South Africa has an embassy in Stockholm.; Sweden has an embassy in Pretoria.
Sudan	27 October 1957	Both countries established diplomatic relations on 27 October 1957 when has been accredited Envoy Extraordinary and Minister Plenipotentiary of Sweden to Sudan (Resident in Addis Ababa) Dr. Bjorn Axel Eyvind Bratt.: Sudan has an embassy in Stockholm.; Sweden has an embassy in Khartoum.
Tanzania	29 May 1964	Both countries established diplomatic relations on 29 May 1964 when Otto Gustaf Rathsman presented his credentials as Sweden's Ambassador to the United Republic of Tanganyika and Zanzibar to President Nyerere.: Sweden has an embassy in Dar es Salaam.; Tanzania has an embassy in Stockholm.
Tunisia		See Sweden–Tunisia relations: Sweden has an embassy in Tunis.; Tunisia has an embassy in Stockholm.
Zimbabwe	30 April 1980	Both countries established diplomatic relations on 30 April 1980 when first Ambassador of Mozambique to Zimbabwe presented his credentials.

== Americas ==
Region	Formal relations began	Notes
Argentina		See Argentina–Sweden relations: Argentina has an embassy in Stockholm.; Sweden has an embassy in Buenos Aires.
Belize	17 November 1982	Both countries established diplomatic relations on 17 November 1982.: Belize has an honorary consulate in Stockholm.; Sweden is accredited to Belize from its embassy in Guatemala City and maintains an honorary consulate in Belmopan.
Bolivia	2 February 1932	Both countries established diplomatic relations on 2 February 1932.: Bolivia has an embassy in Stockholm.; Sweden has an embassy in La Paz.
Brazil		See Brazil–Sweden relations: Brazil has an embassy in Stockholm.; Sweden has an embassy in Brasília.
Canada		See Canada–Sweden relations See also: Swedish Canadian Relations with Canada are close, positive and constructive. Both countries have strong commitments to peacekeeping, UN reform, development assistance, environmental protection, sustainable development, and the promotion and protection of human rights. In addition, there are more than 300,000 Canadians of Swedish descent.: Canada has an embassy in Stockholm.; Sweden has an embassy in Ottawa.; Both countries are members of NATO.
Chile	1827	See Chile–Sweden relations: Chile has an embassy in Stockholm and a consulate in Gothenburg.; Sweden has an embassy in Santiago.
Colombia	11 December 1874	See Colombia–Sweden relations: Colombia has an embassy in Stockholm.; Sweden has an embassy in Bogotá.; Sweden is the 6th largest trade partner of Colombia in the European Union.
Guyana	16 June 1975	Both countries established diplomatic relations on 16 June 1975.: Guyana has an honorary consulate in Stockholm.; Sweden has an ambassador accredited to Guyana based in Stockholm.
Mexico	1850	See Mexico–Sweden relations.: Mexico has an embassy in Stockholm.; Sweden has an embassy in Mexico City.
Peru	11 February 1938	See Peru–Sweden relations. Both countries established diplomatic relations on 11 February 1938.: Peru has an embassy in Stockholm.; Sweden is accredited to Peru from its embassy in Santiago, Chile.
United States	29 April 1818	See Sweden–United States relations. Both countries established diplomatic relations on 29 April 1818. See also: Swedish American Sweden and the United States have had strong ties since the 18th century.: Sweden has an embassy in Washington, D.C.; United States has an embassy in Stockholm.; Both countries are members of NATO.

== Asia ==
Country	Formal relations began	Notes
Armenia	10 July 1992	Both countries established diplomatic relations on 10 July 1992.: Armenia has an embassy in Stockholm.; Sweden opened an embassy in Yerevan 2014.; Sweden has recognized the Armenian genocide on March 29, 2000.; There are around 8,000 people of Armenian descent living in Sweden.; Both countries are members of the Council of Europe.
Azerbaijan	8 May 1992	See Azerbaijan–Sweden relations Both countries established diplomatic relations on 8 May 1992.: The embassy of Sweden in Baku opened in 2014.; Azerbaijani opened an embassy in Stockholm.; Currently, approximately 10 thousand Azerbaijanis live in Sweden, and in addition about 30 thousand Azerbaijanis from Iran.; In 2006, a diaspora organization called «Odlar yurdu» was established in Sweden.; In 2010, the Congress of Swedish Azerbaijanis was established.; Both countries are members of the Council of Europe.
China		See China–Sweden relations.: China has an embassy in Stockholm and a consulate-general in Gothenburg.; Sweden has an embassy in Beijing and consulates-general in Hong Kong and Shanghai.; In July 2019, the UN ambassadors from 22 nations, including Sweden, signed a joint letter to the UNHRC condemning China's mistreatment of the Uyghurs as well as its mistreatment of other minority groups, urging the Chinese government to close the Xinjiang re-education camps.
Georgia	19 September 1992	See Georgia–Sweden relations. Both countries established diplomatic relations on 19 September 1992.: Georgia has an embassy in Stockholm.; Sweden has an embassy in Tbilisi.; Both countries are members of the Council of Europe.; Georgia is an EU candidate and Sweden is an EU member.
India		See India–Sweden relations.
Indonesia		See Indonesia–Sweden relations.
Iran	5 September 1897	See Iran–Sweden relations. Both countries established diplomatic relations on 5 September 1897 when has been accredited first Envoy Extraordinary and Minister Plenipotentiary of Persia to Sweden with residence in St. Peterbourg Mirza Reza Khan Ar Faed-Doouleh.
Iraq		See Iraq–Sweden relations. The Swedish Embassy in Iraq is permanently closed after attacks by protesters over Quran Burning on the Swedish Embassy in Baghdad. Iraq severed ties with Sweden since July 2023, after Swedish authorities allowed a man to burn the Iraqi flag and the Quran in front of the Iraqi Embassy, Stockholm.
Israel		See Israel–Sweden relations. Both countries established diplomatic relations in 1949. Israel has an embassy in Stockholm. Sweden has an embassy in Tel Aviv.
Japan	1868	See Japan–Sweden relations. Both countries established diplomatic relations in 1868 by signing the Swedish-Japanese Treaty in 1868.: Sweden has an embassy in Tokyo.; Sweden has consulates in Kobe and Fukuoka.; Japan has an embassy in Stockholm.
Kazakhstan	7 April 1992	Both countries established diplomatic relations on 7 April 1992.: Sweden has an embassy in Astana.; Kazakhstan has an embassy in Stockholm.
Kuwait	22 December 1964	Both countries established diplomatic relations on 22 December 1964 when Sweden opened its embassy in Kuwait.
Malaysia		See Malaysia–Sweden relations. Diplomatic relations were established in 1958. Sweden has an embassy in Kuala Lumpur, and Malaysia has an embassy in Stockholm. As of 2009, 90 Swedish companies are present in Malaysia and about 450 Swedish citizens live in Malaysia.
North Korea	April 7, 1973	See North Korea–Sweden relations.: North Korea has an embassy in Stockholm.; Sweden has an embassy in Pyongyang.
Palestine	October 30, 2014	See Palestine–Sweden relations.
Saudi Arabia		See Saudi Arabia–Sweden relations. Both countries established diplomatic relations in 1957.
South Korea	11 March 1959	See South Korea–Sweden relations The establishment of diplomatic relations between South Korea and Sweden began on March 11, 1959.: Sweden has a Working Holiday Program agreement with South Korea. There is no quote for South Korean citizens working in Sweden.; South Korea has an embassy in Stockholm.; Sweden has an embassy in Seoul.; Sweden has consulates in Busan, Daegu, Daejon, Gwangju, Hongcheon, Incheon.; Sweden and South Korea are member states of the UN, WTO and OECD.; South Korean MFA relations with the Kingdom of Sweden
Syria	24 June 1947	See Sweden–Syria relations. Both countries established diplomatic relations on 24 June 1947 when has been accredited Envoy Extraordinary and Minister Plenipotentiary of Sweden to Syria with residence in Cairo, Widar Bagge.
Turkey		See Sweden–Turkey relations.: Sweden has an embassy in Ankara and a consulate-general in Istanbul.; Turkey has an embassy in Stockholm.; Sweden is an EU member and Turkey is a candidate.; Both countries are full members of the Council of Europe, NATO, the Organisation for Economic Co-operation and Development (OECD), the Organization for Security and Co-operation in Europe (OSCE) and the Union for the Mediterranean. Sweden supports Turkey's European Union membership. Turkey did not fully support the accession of Sweden to NATO until January 2024, whereupon it was accepted.

== Europe ==
Region	Formal relations began	Notes
Albania	20 June 1969	See Albania–Sweden relations Both countries established diplomatic relations on 20 June 1969.: Albania has an embassy in Stockholm.; Sweden has an embassy in Tirana.; Both countries are members of NATO.; Albania is an EU candidate and Sweden is an EU member.
Austria		Austria has an embassy in Stockholm.; Sweden has an embassy in Vienna.; There are 7,000 Austrians living in Sweden.; There are 2,000 Swedes living in Austria.; Both countries became members of the European Union on 1 January 1995.
Belarus	14 January 1992	Both countries established diplomatic relations on 14 January 1992. There are 3,000 Belarusian living in Sweden and above 1,000 Swedes living in Belarus.: Belarus has an embassy in Stockholm.; Sweden has an embassy in Minsk.; Both countries are full members of the Organization for Security and Co-operation in Europe.
Belgium	23 February 1837	Both countries established diplomatic relations on 23 February 1837 when has been accredited Chargé d'Affaires of Belgium to Sweden baron T. Vander Straten Ponthoz. There is an ethnic group of Walloons living in Sweden making up the 8,000 Belgians living in Sweden and 5,000 Swedes living in Belgium.: Belgium has an embassy in Stockholm.; Sweden has an ambassador accredited to Belgium based in Stockholm.; Both countries are members of the European Union and NATO.
Bosnia and Herzegovina	15 December 1992	Both countries established diplomatic relations on 15 December 1992.
Bulgaria	July 6, 1914	There are approximately 3,000 Swedes living in Bulgaria and: Bulgaria has embassy in Stockholm.; Sweden has an ambassador accredited to Bulgaria based in Stockholm.; Both countries are full members of the Council of Europe, of the Organization for Security and Co-operation in Europe and of the European Union and NATO.
Croatia	29 January 1992	See Croatia–Sweden relations.: Both countries established diplomatic relations on 29 January 1992.; Croatia has an embassy in Stockholm.; Sweden has an embassy in Zagreb.; Sweden joined the European Union as a full member on 1 January 1995, while Croatia joined on 1 July 2013.; Both countries are members of the European Union and NATO.
Cyprus		See Cyprus–Sweden relations.: Cyprus has an embassy in Stockholm.; Sweden has an embassy in Nicosia.; Sweden joined the European Union as a full member on 1 January 1995, while Cyprus joined on 1 May 2004.
Czech Republic	1 January 1993	Both countries established diplomatic relations on 1 January 1993.: Czech Republic has an embassy in Stockholm.; Sweden has an embassy in Prague.; Both countries are full members of the European Union, NATO, and the Council of Europe.
Denmark		See Denmark–Sweden relations. Today, both countries are separated by the Øresund, which links the Baltic Sea and the North Sea. Both countries are full members of the Council of the Baltic Sea States, of the Council of Europe, and of the European Union. There are around 21,000 Swedes living in Denmark and there are around 42,000 Danes living in Sweden.: Denmark has an embassy in Stockholm.; Sweden has an embassy in Copenhagen.; Both countries are full members of the European Union, NATO, and the Council of Europe.
Estonia	28 August 1991	See Estonia–Sweden relations. Estonia was under Swedish rule between 1561 and 1721 Sweden recognized Estonia on 4 February 1921. Sweden resumed diplomatic relations with Estonia on 28 August 1991.: Estonia has an embassy in Stockholm.; Sweden has an embassy in Tallinn.; Both countries are members of the European Union and NATO.
Finland		See Finland–Sweden relations. Finnish–Swedish relations have a long history (Sweden and Finland were the same country for several hundred years), due to the close relationship between Finland and Sweden. Particularly in Finland, the issue emerges in frequent exposés of Finnish history, and in motives for governmental proposals and actions as reported in Finnish news broadcasts in English or other foreign languages. In Sweden, this relationship is a recurrent important theme of 20th-century history, although maybe by most Swedes considered to be an issue of purely historical relevance now that both countries have been members of the European Union since 1995.: Finland has an embassy in Stockholm.; Sweden has an embassy in Helsinki and a consulate-general in Mariehamn.; Both countries became members of the European Union on 1 January 1995.; Both countries applied for NATO membership on 18 May 2022. Finland became a member on 4 April 2023, while Sweden became a member on 7 March 2024.; Both countries are members of the European Union and NATO.
France		See France–Sweden relations.: France has an embassy in Stockholm.; Sweden has an embassy in Paris.; Both countries are full members of the European Union, NATO, and the Council of Europe.
Germany		See Germany–Sweden relations.: Germany has an embassy in Stockholm.; Sweden has an embassy in Berlin.; Both countries are full members of the European Union, NATO, and the Council of Europe.
Greece	24 January 1833	See Greece–Sweden relations. Both countries established diplomatic relations on 24 January 1833 when Carl Peter von Heidenstam (until then Consul General) was appointed as Chargé d'Affaires of the Kingdom of Sweden and Norway in Greece.: Greece has an embassy in Stockholm.; Sweden has an embassy in Athens.; Both countries are full members of the European Union, NATO, and the Council of Europe.
Hungary		See Hungary–Sweden relations. Diplomacy relations between the two countries started on December 28, 1945.: Hungary has an embassy in Stockholm.; Sweden has an embassy in Budapest.; Sweden joined the European Union as a full member on 1 January 1995, while Hungary joined on 1 May 2004.; Both countries are members of the European Union and NATO.
Iceland		See Iceland–Sweden relations.: Iceland has an embassy in Stockholm.; Sweden has an embassy in Reykjavík.; Both countries are members of NATO.
Ireland	18 July 1946	See Ireland–Sweden relations. Both countries established diplomatic relations on 18 July 1946. Ireland has an embassy in Stockholm.: Sweden has an embassy in Dublin.; Both countries are full members of Council of Europe and of the European Union.
Italy	23 December 1859	See Italy–Sweden relations. Both countries established diplomatic relations on 23 December 1859 when the first interim Chargé d'Affaires, Giov. Antonio Migliorati, was appointed.: Italy has an embassy in Stockholm.; Sweden has an embassy in Rome.; Both countries are members of the European Union and NATO.
Kosovo		See Kosovo–Sweden relations. Sweden recognized Kosovo on March 4, 2008. Liaison Office of Sweden in Pristina, subordinated to the embassy in Skopje, North Macedonia. On March 8, 2008, the Swedish Minister for Foreign Affairs Carl Bildt became the first foreign minister to officially visit Kosovo since it declared its independence. Sweden currently has 243 troops serving in Kosovo as peacekeepers in the NATO led Kosovo Force.: Kosovo has an embassy in Stockholm.; Sweden has an embassy in Pristina.
Latvia	28 August 1991	See Latvia–Sweden relations. Sweden recognized Latvia on 4 February 1921. Sweden resumed diplomatic relations with Latvia on 28 August 1991.: Latvia has an embassy in Stockholm.; Sweden has an embassy in Riga.; Sweden joined the European Union as a full member on 1 January 1995, while Latvia joined on 1 May 2004.; Both countries are members of the European Union and NATO.
Lithuania	28 August 1991	See Lithuania–Sweden relations. Sweden recognized Lithuania on 28 September 1921. Sweden resumed diplomatic relations with Lithuania on 28 August 1991.: Lithuania has an embassy in Stockholm.; Sweden has an embassy in Vilnius.; Sweden joined the European Union as a full member on 1 January 1995, while Lithuania joined on 1 May 2004.; Both countries are members of the European Union and NATO.
Moldova	12 June 1992	See Moldova–Sweden relations. Both countries established diplomatic relations on 12 June 1992. Sweden is one of Moldova's top donors. From 1996, Sweden provided Moldova with technical assistance worth 30 million dollars, which significantly helped strengthen sectors such as: protection of human rights, democracy, good governance, public health, education, agriculture, energy, infrastructure, transport and the private sector. Much of the aid is delivered through the Swedish International Development Agency. In 2007, the Swedish Government established the 2007–2010 strategy of cooperation with Moldova, which sees 11 million euros in financial assistance annually for three important sectors: good governance, strengthening of com petitiveness in the rural area and reduction of vulnerability in the energy sector.: Moldova has an embassy in Stockholm.; Sweden has an embassy in Chișinău.; Moldova is an EU candidate and Sweden is an EU member.; Both countries are members of the Council of Europe.
Netherlands		See Netherlands–Sweden relations.: The Netherlands has an embassy in Stockholm.; Sweden has an embassy in The Hague.; Both countries are full members of the European Union, NATO, and of the Council of Europe.
Norway		See Norway–Sweden relations.: Norway has an embassy in Stockholm.; Sweden has an embassy in Oslo.; Both countries are members of NATO.
Poland		See Poland–Sweden relations.: Poland has an embassy in Stockholm.; Sweden has an embassy in Warsaw.; Sweden joined the European Union as a full member on 1 January 1995, while Poland joined on 1 May 2004.; Both countries are members of the European Union and NATO.
Portugal		See Portugal–Sweden relations.: Portugal has an embassy in Stockholm.; Sweden has an embassy in Lisbon.; Both countries are full members of the European Union, NATO, and the Council of Europe.
Romania	1 November 1916	Romania has an embassy in Stockholm.; Sweden has an embassy in Bucharest.; Sweden joined the European Union as a full member on 1 January 1995, while Romania joined on 1 January 2007.; Both countries are members of the European Union and NATO.
Russia		See Russia–Sweden relations.: Russia has an embassy in Stockholm and a consulate-general in Gothenburg.; Sweden has an embassy in Moscow and a consulate-general in Saint Petersburg.
Serbia		See Serbia–Sweden relations.: Serbia has an embassy in Stockholm.; Sweden has an embassy in Belgrade.; Serbia is an EU candidate and Sweden is an EU member.
Slovenia		Slovenia is accredited to Sweden from its embassy in Copenhagen, Denmark.; Sweden is accredited to Slovenia from its embassy in Budapest, Hungary.; Both countries are full members of the European Union and NATO.
Spain		See Spain–Sweden relations.: Spain has an embassy in Stockholm.; Sweden has an embassy in Madrid.; Both countries are full members of the European Union, NATO, and the Council of Europe.
Switzerland		Sweden has an embassy in Bern.; Switzerland has an embassy in Stockholm.; Both countries are members of the Council of Europe.
Ukraine	13 January 1992	See Sweden–Ukraine relations. Both countries established diplomatic relations on 13 January 1992. A Ukrainian information bureau was opened 1916 in Stockholm by Volodymyr Stepankivskyi and M. Zaliznyak. In 1918 an official diplomatic mission from the Ukrainian People's Republic headed by K. Lossky was opened in Stockholm. Diplomatic relations between Ukraine and Sweden were established on January 13, 1992.: Sweden has an embassy in Kyiv.; Ukraine has an embassy in Stockholm.; Both countries are members of the Council of Europe.; Sweden is an EU member and Ukraine is a candidate.
United Kingdom	23 December 1653	See Sweden–United Kingdom relations. Sweden established diplomatic relations with the United Kingdom on 23 December 1653.: Sweden maintains an embassy in London.; The United Kingdom is accredited to Sweden through its embassy in Stockholm.; Both countries share common membership of the Council of Europe, the European Court of Human Rights, the International Criminal Court, the Joint Expeditionary Force, NATO, the OECD, the OSCE, the United Nations, and the World Trade Organization. Bilaterally the two countries have a Double Taxation Convention, a Mutual Defence Agreement, and a Strategic Partnership.

== Oceania ==
Country	Formal relations began	Notes
Australia		See Australia–Sweden relations.: Australia has an embassy in Stockholm.; Sweden has an embassy in Canberra and eight honorary consulates: Adelaide, Brisbane, Cairns, Darin, Hobart, Melbourne, Perth and Sydney.
Fiji	3 April 1979	Both countries established diplomatic relations on 3 April 1979.
New Zealand		See New Zealand–Sweden relations.: New Zealand has an embassy in Stockholm.; Sweden is accredited to New Zealand from its embassy in Canberra.

== See also ==
- Politics of Sweden
- List of diplomatic missions in Sweden
- List of diplomatic missions of Sweden
- List of state visits made by King Carl XVI Gustaf of Sweden
- Scandinavian defence union
- Visa requirements for Swedish citizens
- Arctic policy of Sweden
- List of ambassadors of Sweden to Ukraine
- Sweden–NATO relations
