= North Korea–Sweden relations =

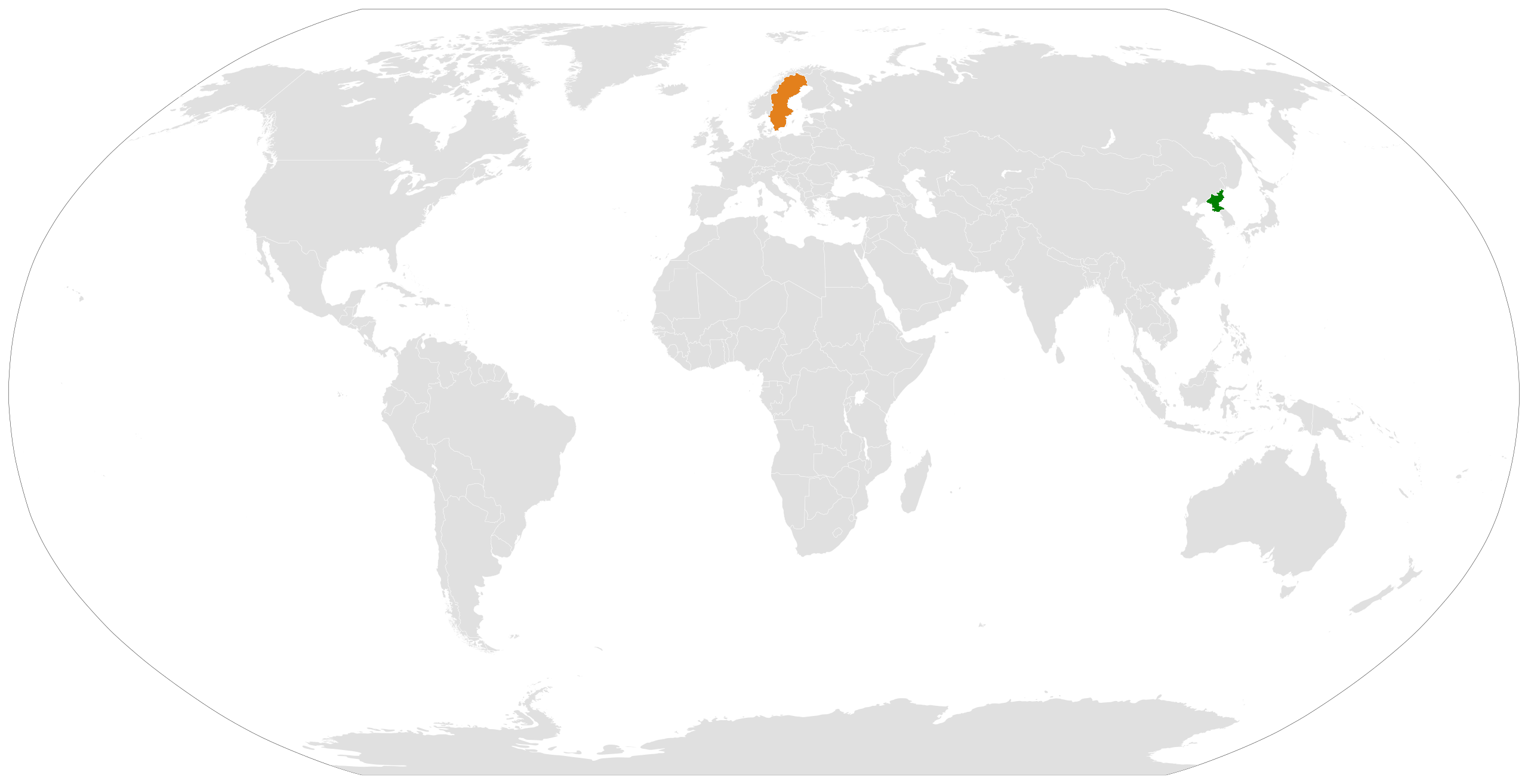

- North Korea: Sweden

Diplomatic mission
- Embassy of the Democratic People's Republic of Korea, Stockholm: Embassy of Sweden, Pyongyang

Envoy
- Ambassador Ri Won Guk: Ambassador Andreas Bengtsson

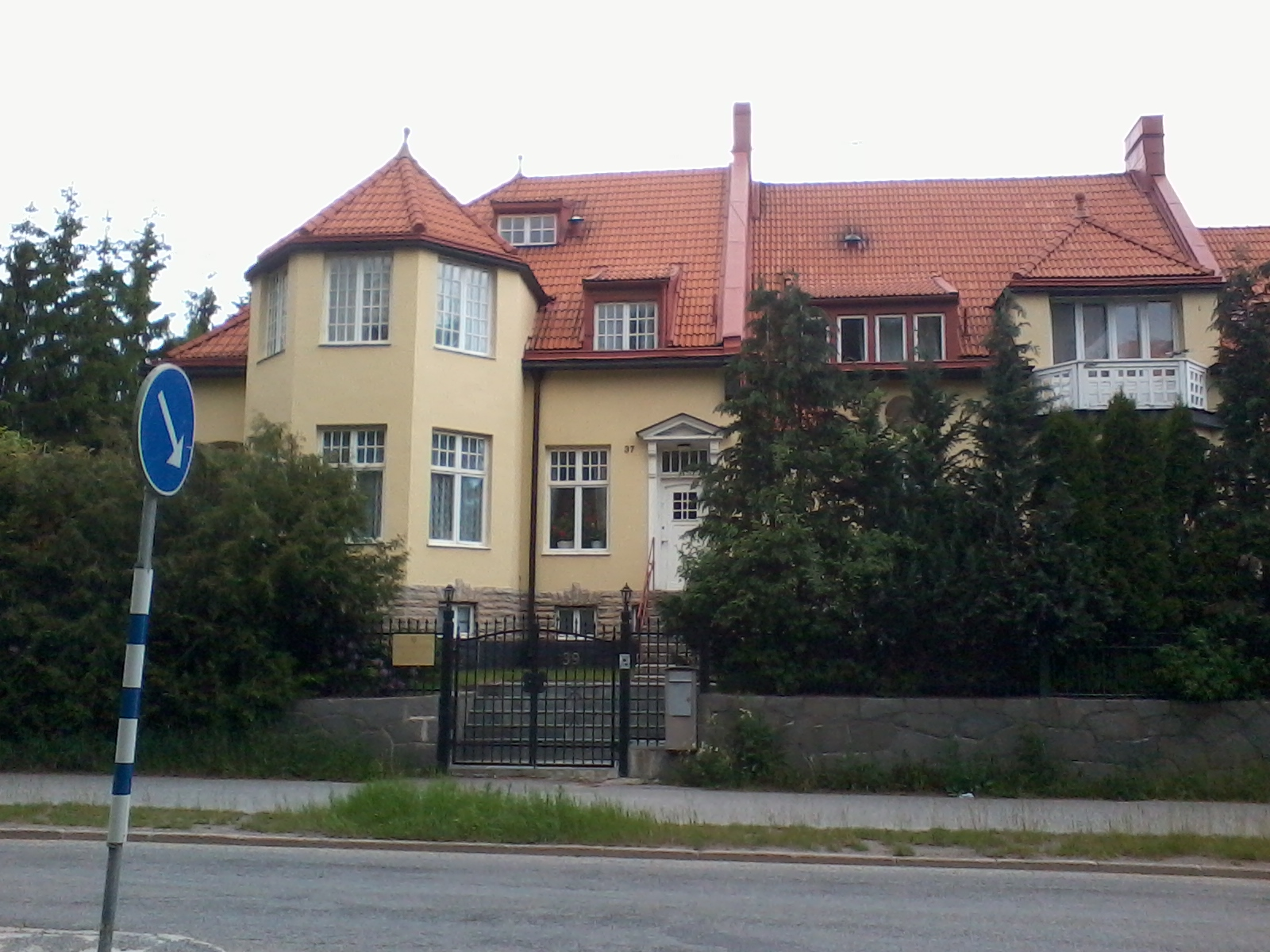
Embassy of the Democratic People's Republic of Korea in Stockholm

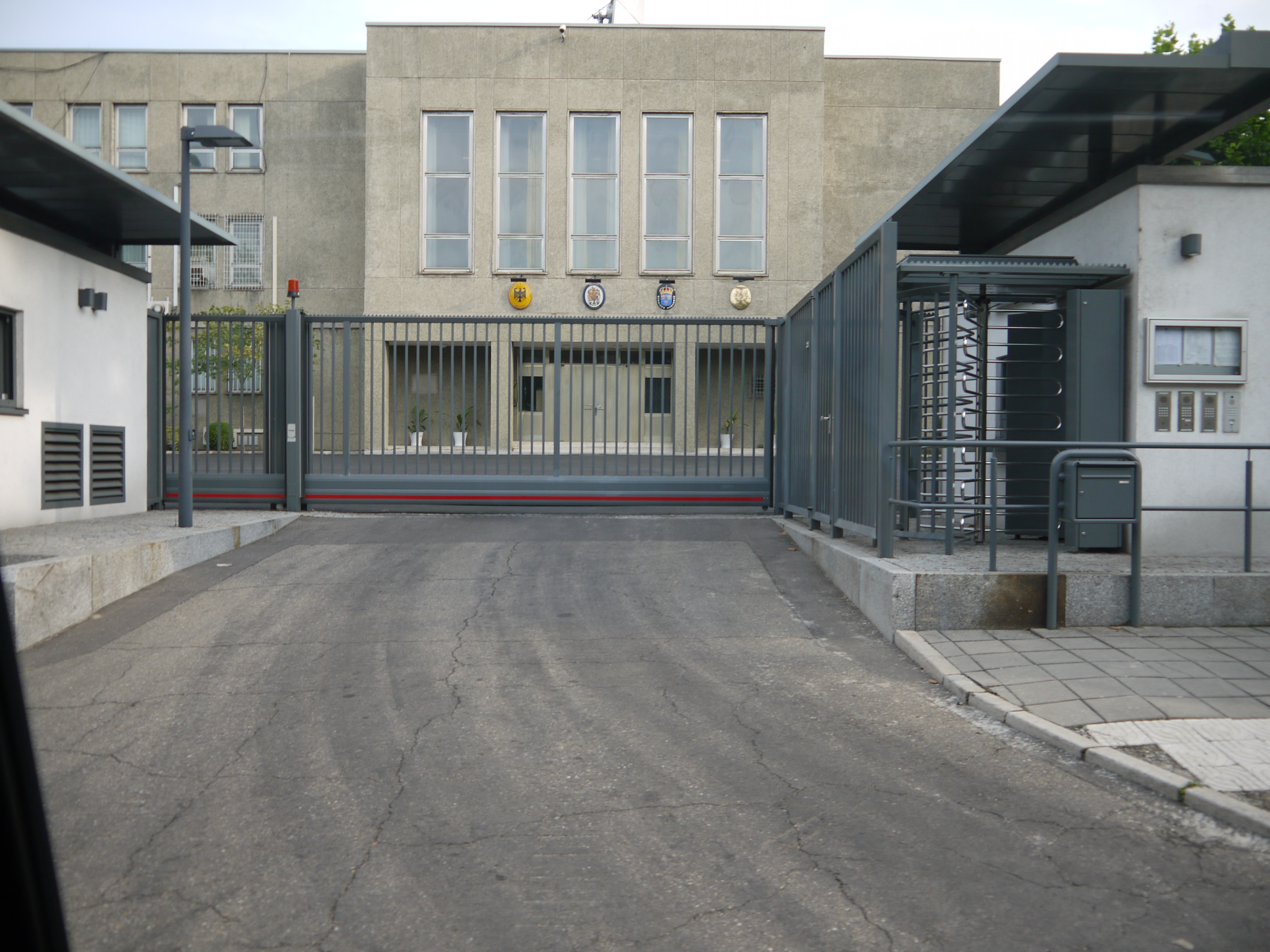
Embassy of Sweden, Pyongyang

Diplomatic relations between North Korea and Sweden established bilateral relations since 7 April 1973. Sweden has had a long-term commitment in North Korea and its relations with the country are exceptionally close among Western nations. Sweden is one of the major contributors of humanitarian aid to North Korea.

== History ==
Sweden took part in the Korean War by providing the Swedish Red Cross Field Hospital and participating in the Neutral Nations Supervisory Commission.

The Swedish Red Cross Field Hospital was the name given to the Swedish mission sent to Korea to deal with the humanitarian situation created by the Korean War, from 1950 to 1953. Following the temporary resolution of the war in 1953, Sweden was heavily involved in maintaining the armistice through its position in the Neutral Nations Supervisory Commission.

Left-wing politicians in Sweden were campaigning for the recognition of North Korea on the basis that Sweden had already recognized South Korea in 1959. North Korea established an information bureau in Stockholm in 1970 and also held an exhibition presenting the country at the ABF-huset. Sweden and North Korea established formal diplomatic relations on 7 April 1973.

In the 1970s, North Korean diplomats were discovered to run smuggling of cigarettes and liquor in Western Europe as part of the country's illicit activities to earn currency. Out of these smuggling rings, the largest one was in Sweden.

Swedish prime minister Göran Persson visited North Korea, as the first Western leader in history, in 2001 to head a European Union delegation for talks with then-leader Kim Jong-il.

In early 2018, North Korea's deputy foreign minister visited Sweden to discuss the upcoming 2018 North Korea–United States summit with foreign minister Margot Wallström and prime minister Stefan Löfven. His visit was followed by North Korea's foreign minister Ri Yong-ho in March 2018.

== Embassies ==
North Korea has an embassy in Sweden, and Sweden has one in North Korea:

- Embassy of Sweden, Pyongyang
- Embassy of the Democratic People's Republic of Korea, Stockholm

Sweden was the first Western country to establish an embassy in Pyongyang, in 1975, and remained the only one for 26 years to maintain ambassadorial presence. Few Western nations still have an embassy in Pyongyang, and the fact that Sweden does testifies of its important present-day role in the country. Through its embassy, Sweden represents consular interests of Australia, Canada, Italy, the Nordic countries as well as the United States. Sweden often acts as an intermediary in negotiations between North Korea and Western countries, and has been especially active in improving the ties of North Korea and the United States.

== Trade ==
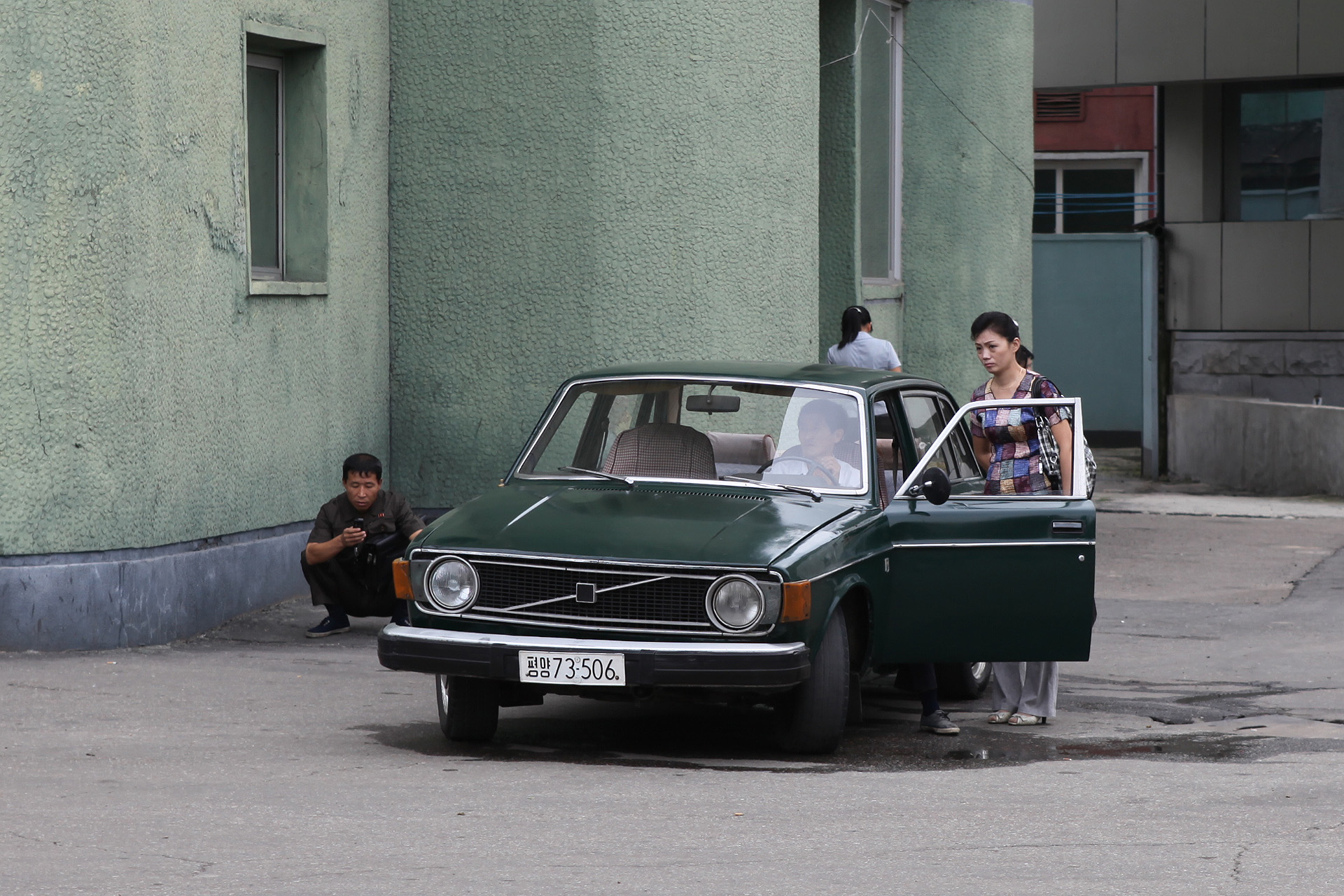
A Volvo 144 imported from Sweden to North Korea, 2010

In the 1970s, Sweden began to see North Korea as a lucrative market. Swedish companies like Volvo, ASEA, Kockums, Atlas Copco, and Alfa Laval wanted to export their products to the country and held an industrial exhibition in Pyongyang. During that decade, North Korea imported various items, including about 1,000 Volvo automobiles that were never paid for, prompting Soviet diplomats to call it the "largest car theft in the human history". These Volvos were a common sighting in Pyongyang until the 2010s. They have since become increasingly difficult to maintain. North Korea still owes 2.2 billion Swedish kronor (234 million euros) to Sweden from these imports. Out of all countries, the North Korean debt to Sweden is the largest, followed by Iraq whose debt is a billion kronor smaller.

== Civil society ==
Villy Bergström, a former vice director of the Swedish National Bank, had visited North Korea in 1971 as a journalist and written about his visit in a book, Bilder från Nordkorea [Images from North Korea]. At the time, the book was criticized for being anti-Korean and too critical of the country. Later, it has been opposed as being too sympathetic toward North Korea. Bergström has never regretted the book, despite it being called inappropriate for a person holding such a high office.

== See also ==
- Foreign relations of North Korea
- Foreign relations of Sweden
