= Embassy of Indonesia, Stockholm =

Embassy of Indonesia, Stockholm Kedutaan Besar Republik Indonesia di Stockholm Indonesiens ambassad i Stockholm

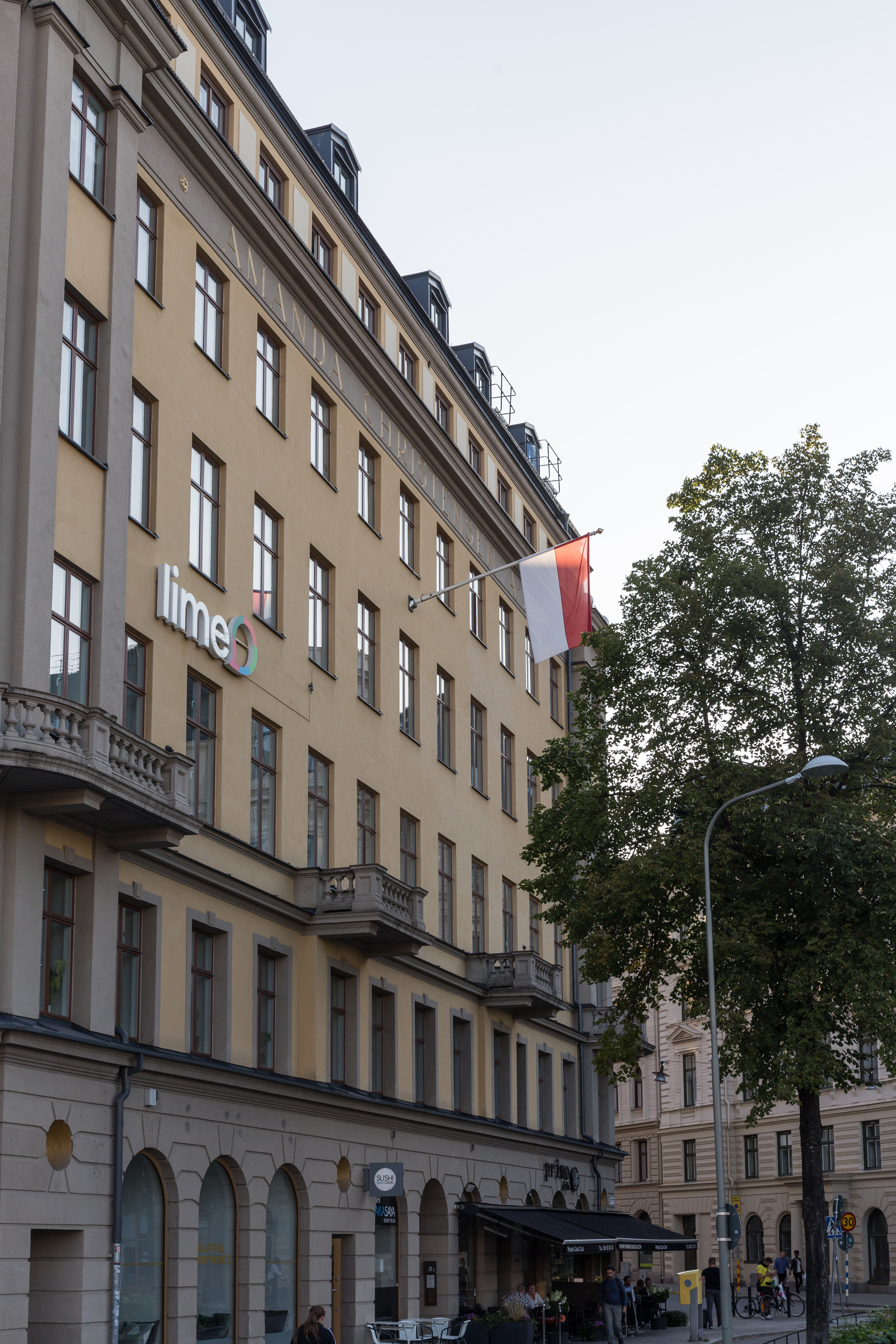
- Location: Stockholm, Sweden
- Address: Kungsbroplan 1, Stockholm, Sweden
- Coordinates: 59°19′54.1″N 18°2′57.8″E
- Ambassador: Kamapradipta Isnomo
- Jurisdiction: Sweden; Latvia
- Website: kemlu.go.id/stockholm/en

The Embassy of Indonesia, Stockholm (Indonesian: Kedutaan Besar Republik Indonesia di Stockholm; Swedish: Indonesiens ambassad i Stockholm) is the diplomatic mission of the Republic of Indonesia to the Kingdom of Sweden. The embassy is also accredited to the Republic of Latvia. The current ambassador is Kamapradipta Isnomo who was appointed by President Joko Widodo in September 2020.

== History ==
Diplomatic relations between Indonesia and Sweden started in 1951. A Legation Office was headed by Z. A. Tamzil and assisted by First Secretary W. J. D. Pesik, Trade Secretary Baron Sutadisastra, Information Attaché John Senduk, Attaché Padmo Wirjono, and Chancellor Hari Purwanto. Diplomatic relations and the embassy's accreditation to Latvia started in 1993.

The chancery is located at Kungsbroplan 1, Stockholm. Prior to this location, the offices were located at Sysslomansgatan 18. At the very start of the diplomatic mission when it was still a legation office, it was located at Strandvägen 47.

== See also ==
- Indonesia–Sweden relations
- List of diplomatic missions in Indonesia
- List of diplomatic missions in Sweden
