= List of diplomatic missions in Sweden =

This article lists diplomatic missions resident in Sweden. At present, the capital city of Stockholm hosts 109 embassies. Several countries have ambassadors accredited to Sweden, with most being resident in Berlin, Brussels, Copenhagen, or London.

This listing excludes honorary consulates.

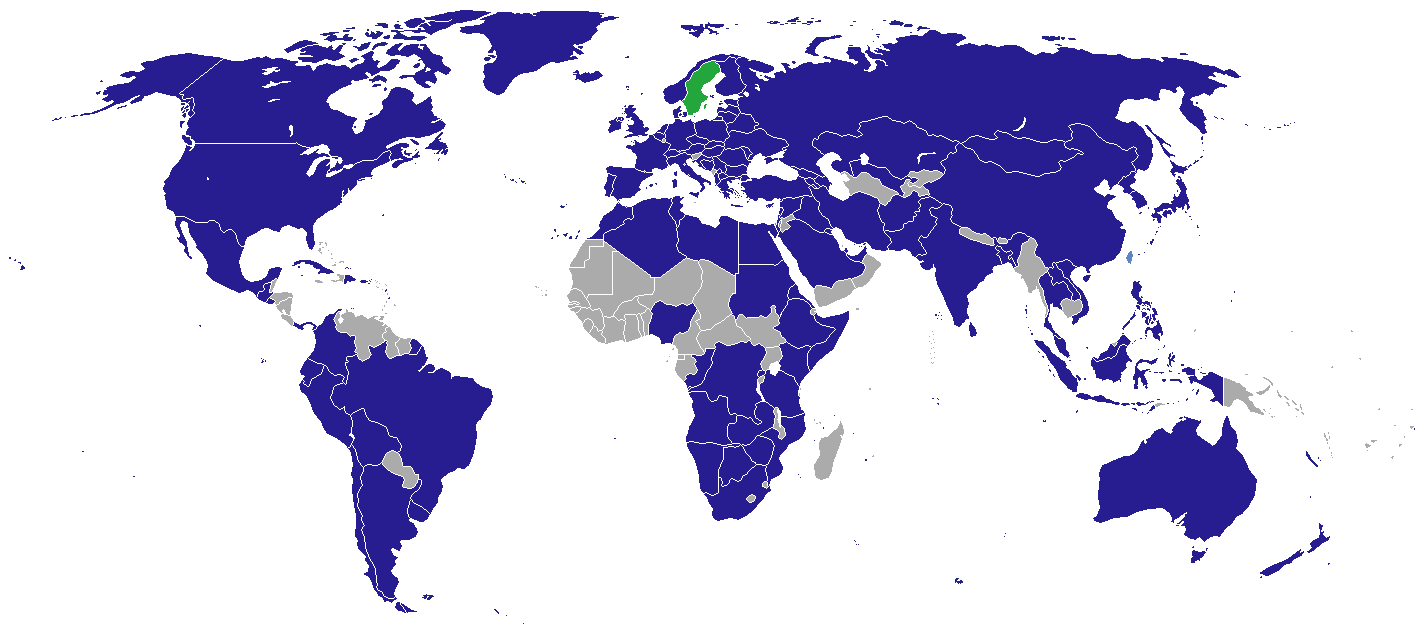
Map of diplomatic missions in Sweden

== Diplomatic missions in Stockholm and metropolitan area ==
Country	Mission type	Location	Photo
Afghanistan	Embassy	Skarpnäck	
Albania	Embassy	Lidingö	
Algeria	Embassy	Stockholm	
Angola	Embassy	Solna	-
Argentina	Embassy	Stockholm	
Armenia	Embassy	Stockholm	
Australia	Embassy	Stockholm	
Austria	Embassy	Stockholm	
Azerbaijan	Embassy	Stockholm	
Bangladesh	Embassy	Solna	
Belarus	Embassy	Nacka	
Belgium	Embassy	Stockholm	
Bolivia	Embassy	Lidingö	
Bosnia and Herzegovina	Embassy	Stockholm	
Botswana	Embassy	Stockholm	
Brazil	Embassy	Stockholm	
Bulgaria	Embassy	Stockholm	
Canada	Embassy	Stockholm	
Chile	Embassy	Stockholm	
China	Embassy	Stockholm	
Colombia	Embassy	Stockholm	
Republic of the Congo	Embassy	Stockholm	
Democratic Republic of the Congo	Embassy	Lidingö	
Croatia	Embassy	Stockholm	
Cuba	Embassy	Stocksund	
Cyprus	Embassy	Stockholm	
Czech Republic	Embassy	Stockholm	
Denmark	Embassy	Stockholm	
Dominican Republic	Embassy	Stockholm	-
Ecuador	Embassy	Stockholm	
Egypt	Embassy	Stockholm	
El Salvador	Embassy	Lidingö	
Eritrea	Embassy	Lidingö	
Estonia	Embassy	Stockholm	
Ethiopia	Embassy	Stocksund	-
Finland	Embassy	Stockholm	
France	Embassy	Stockholm	
Georgia	Embassy	Stockholm	
Germany	Embassy	Stockholm	
Greece	Embassy	Stockholm	
Guatemala	Embassy	Stockholm	-
Holy See	Apostolic Nunciature	Djursholm	
Hungary	Embassy	Stockholm	
Iceland	Embassy	Stockholm	
India	Embassy	Stockholm	
Indonesia	Embassy	Stockholm	
Iran	Embassy	Lidingö	-
Iraq	Embassy	Stockholm	
Ireland	Embassy	Stockholm	
Israel	Embassy	Stockholm	
Italy	Embassy	Stockholm	
Japan	Embassy	Stockholm	
Kazakhstan	Embassy	Stockholm	
Kenya	Embassy	Stockholm	
Kosovo	Embassy	Stockholm	
Kuwait	Embassy	Stockholm	-
Laos	Embassy	Stockholm	-
Latvia	Embassy	Stockholm	
Lebanon	Embassy	Stocksund	-
Libya	Embassy	Stockholm	
Lithuania	Embassy	Stockholm	
Malaysia	Embassy	Stockholm	-
Mexico	Embassy	Stockholm	
Moldova	Embassy	Stockholm	
Mongolia	Embassy	Danderyd	-
Morocco	Embassy	Stockholm	
Mozambique	Embassy	Sollentuna	-
Namibia	Embassy	Stockholm	
Netherlands	Embassy	Stockholm	
New Zealand	Embassy	Stockholm	
Nigeria	Embassy	Stockholm	
Democratic People's Republic of Korea	Embassy	Lidingö	-
North Macedonia	Embassy	Stockholm	
Northern Cyprus	Representative Office	Stockholm	-
Norway	Embassy	Stockholm	
Pakistan	Embassy	Stockholm	
Palestine	Embassy	Stockholm	
Panama	Embassy	Stockholm	
Peru	Embassy	Stockholm	
Philippines	Embassy	Lidingö	
Poland	Embassy	Stockholm	
Portugal	Embassy	Stockholm	
Qatar	Embassy	Stockholm	
Romania	Embassy	Stockholm	
Russia	Embassy	Stockholm	-
Rwanda	Embassy	Stockholm	-
Sahrawi Republic	Representative Office	Stockholm	-
Saudi Arabia	Embassy	Stockholm	-
Serbia	Embassy	Stockholm	-
Slovakia	Embassy	Stockholm	-
Somalia	Embassy	Kista	-
South Africa	Embassy	Stockholm	-
Republic of Korea	Embassy	Stockholm	-
Spain	Embassy	Stockholm	-
Sri Lanka	Embassy	Stockholm	-
Sudan	Embassy	Lidingö	-
Switzerland	Embassy	Stockholm	-
Syria	Embassy	Danderyd	
Republic of China (Taiwan)	Taipei Representative Office	Stockholm	
Tanzania	Embassy	Täby	-
Thailand	Embassy	Stockholm	
Tunisia	Embassy	Stockholm	
Turkey	Embassy	Stockholm	
Ukraine	Embassy	Lidingö	
United Arab Emirates	Embassy	Stockholm	-
United Kingdom	Embassy	Stockholm	
United States	Embassy	Stockholm	
Uruguay	Embassy	Stockholm	
Uzbekistan	Embassy	Stockholm	-
Vietnam	Embassy	Älvsjö	
Zambia	Embassy	Solna	-
Zimbabwe	Embassy	Lidingö	

== Consulates-General in Gothenburg ==
Country	Mission type	City	Photo
Chile	Consulate-General	Gothenburg	-
China	Consulate-General	Gothenburg	
Turkey	Consulate-General	Gothenburg	-

== Mission to open ==
- Gambia

== Accredited embassies ==
=== Resident in Berlin, Germany ===
1. Burundi
2. Chad
3. Guinea
4. Kyrgyzstan
5. Liberia
6. Maldives
7. Mali
8. Oman

=== Resident in Brussels, Belgium ===
1. Bhutan
2. Djibouti
3. Honduras
4. Mauritania
5. Saint Kitts and Nevis
6. Samoa
7. São Tomé and Príncipe

=== Resident in Copenhagen, Denmark ===
1. Burkina Faso
2. Ghana
3. Luxembourg
4. Nepal
5. Niger
6. Slovenia
7. Uganda

=== Resident in London, United Kingdom ===
1. Bahamas
2. Bahrain
3. Barbados
4. Cambodia
5. Cameroon
6. Costa Rica
7. Eswatini
8. Gabon
9. Gambia
10. Jamaica
11. Madagascar
12. Malawi
13. Mauritius
14. Myanmar
15. Seychelles
16. Sierra Leone
17. Trinidad and Tobago
18. Turkmenistan

=== Resident in Oslo, Norway ===
1. Jordan
2. South Sudan

=== Resident in other cities ===
1. Andorra (Andorra la Vella)
2. Lesotho (Dublin)
3. Paraguay (Paris)
4. San Marino (City of San Marino)
5. Senegal (The Hague)
6. Singapore (Singapore)
7. Togo (Ankara)
8. Yemen (The Hague)

== Closed missions ==
Host city	Sending country	Mission	Year closed	Ref.
Stockholm	Cape Verde	Embassy	Unknown	
Stockholm	Guinea-Bissau	Embassy	Unknown	
Stockholm	Honduras	Embassy	Unknown	
Stockholm	Malta	Embassy	2005	
Stockholm	Nicaragua	Embassy	Unknown	
Stockholm	Paraguay	Embassy	2020	
Stockholm	Senegal	Embassy	2020	
Stockholm	Slovenia	Embassy	2012	
Stockholm	Venezuela	Embassy	2018	
Gothenburg	Colombia	Consulate	1988	
Gothenburg	Finland	Consulate	2011	
Gothenburg	Germany	Consulate-General	2023	
Gothenburg	Russia	Consulate-General	2023	
Gothenburg	United Kingdom	Consulate-General	2006	
Gothenburg	United States	Consulate	1988	
Malmö	Poland	Consulate-General	2013	
Malmö	Serbia	Consulate	2008	

== See also ==
- Foreign relations of Sweden
- List of diplomatic missions of Sweden
- Visa requirements for Swedish citizens
