= Indonesia–Sweden relations =

- Indonesia: Sweden

Diplomatic mission
- Embassy of Indonesia, Stockholm: Embassy of Sweden, Jakarta

Indonesia and Sweden established diplomatic relations on 23 November 1950. In recent years both nations demonstrate growing keenness to improve bilateral relations, as each head of government exchanged visits. Indonesia has an embassy in Stockholm that also accredited to Latvia, while Sweden has an embassy in Jakarta that also accredited to Timor-Leste.

== History ==
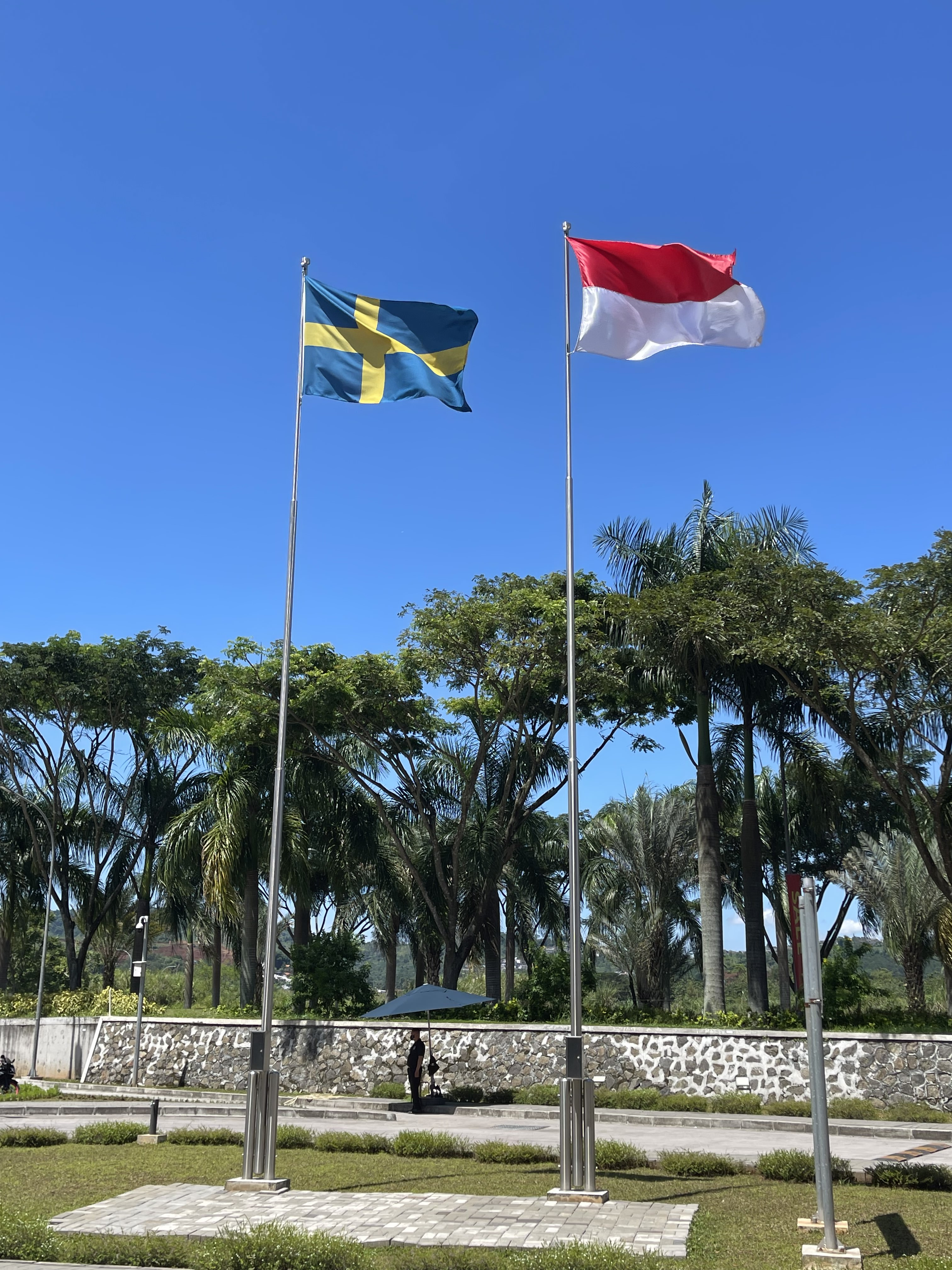
Swedish and Indonesian flags

=== Pre-independence ===
The first known Indonesian in Sweden was Pehr Philander. Indonesians have been in Sweden since the 1760s in small numbers. The Indonesians who were in Sweden during this time were originally enslaved and had been brought to Sweden by the Swedish East India Company.

A Swedish consulate in Batavia (present-day Jakarta) was first established in 1798 to represent Swedish interests in the Dutch East Indies. After periods of closure and reorganization, it was permanently re-established as a honorary consulate in 1856 following an agreement with the Netherlands. Its main responsibilities included protecting Swedish and Norwegian seafarers and promoting trade. In 1905, the Batavia consulate was abolished when Sweden transferred its consular representation to Surabaya, the Dutch East Indies' principal commercial port. The new consulate in Surabaya became the main Swedish consular office in the colony, reflecting the growing importance of maritime commerce and Swedish industrial interests in the region. In 1910 and 1911, Sweden opened honorary vice consulates in Batavia, Makassar, and Padang. From 1920, there was also an honorary vice consulate in Medan, and from 1926, one in Semarang. In 1919, Sweden established a career consulate general in Batavia. In 1933, the consulate general was closed and converted into an honorary consulate general.

=== Post-independence ===
After the Indonesian Revolution, Sweden recognized the new state of Indonesia in 1949. Through the Swedish consul in Surabaya, Director Axel Wieslander, a message was conveyed to the foreign minister of the United States of Indonesia on the occasion of the transfer of sovereignty and the proclamation of the new state on 28 December 1949. In this message, Sweden recognized the Republic of the United States of Indonesia as a free and independent state with effect from that same day. The Indonesian foreign minister was further informed that the Swedish government intended to send a diplomatic representative to the republic in the near future. Pending this appointment, the vice consul at the Consulate General in Jakarta, T. A. E. Andrée, was entrusted with the temporary responsibility of heading the consulate general.

The diplomatic relations between Indonesia and Sweden was established in 1950, followed by the establishment of legations in each counterparts capitals'. In May 1958, an agreement was reached between the Swedish and Indonesian governments to elevate their respective legations to embassies. As a result, the diplomatic rank was changed from envoy extraordinary and minister plenipotentiary to ambassador extraordinary and plenipotentiary.

The first Indonesian President Sukarno visited Sweden on 3–5 May 1959. The Swedish embassy in Jakarta is also accredited to Timor Leste that opened diplomatic relations with Sweden since 2002.

=== Modern era ===
For most of the 1980s and 1990s the bilateral relations were rather strained, due to separatist Free Aceh Movement (GAM) leaders residing in Sweden at the time and making Stockholm their foreign base to gain international support and recognition. During the aftermath of Aceh Tsunami, Sweden was among countries that promptly provided aid to devastated areas in Indonesia. In the next year, Indonesian Government and GAM leaders reconciled their differences through peace negotiations, with the conflict in Aceh ending in 2005. Sweden actively contributed in the Aceh peace process and gave assistance in post-tsunami reconstruction.

== High level visits ==
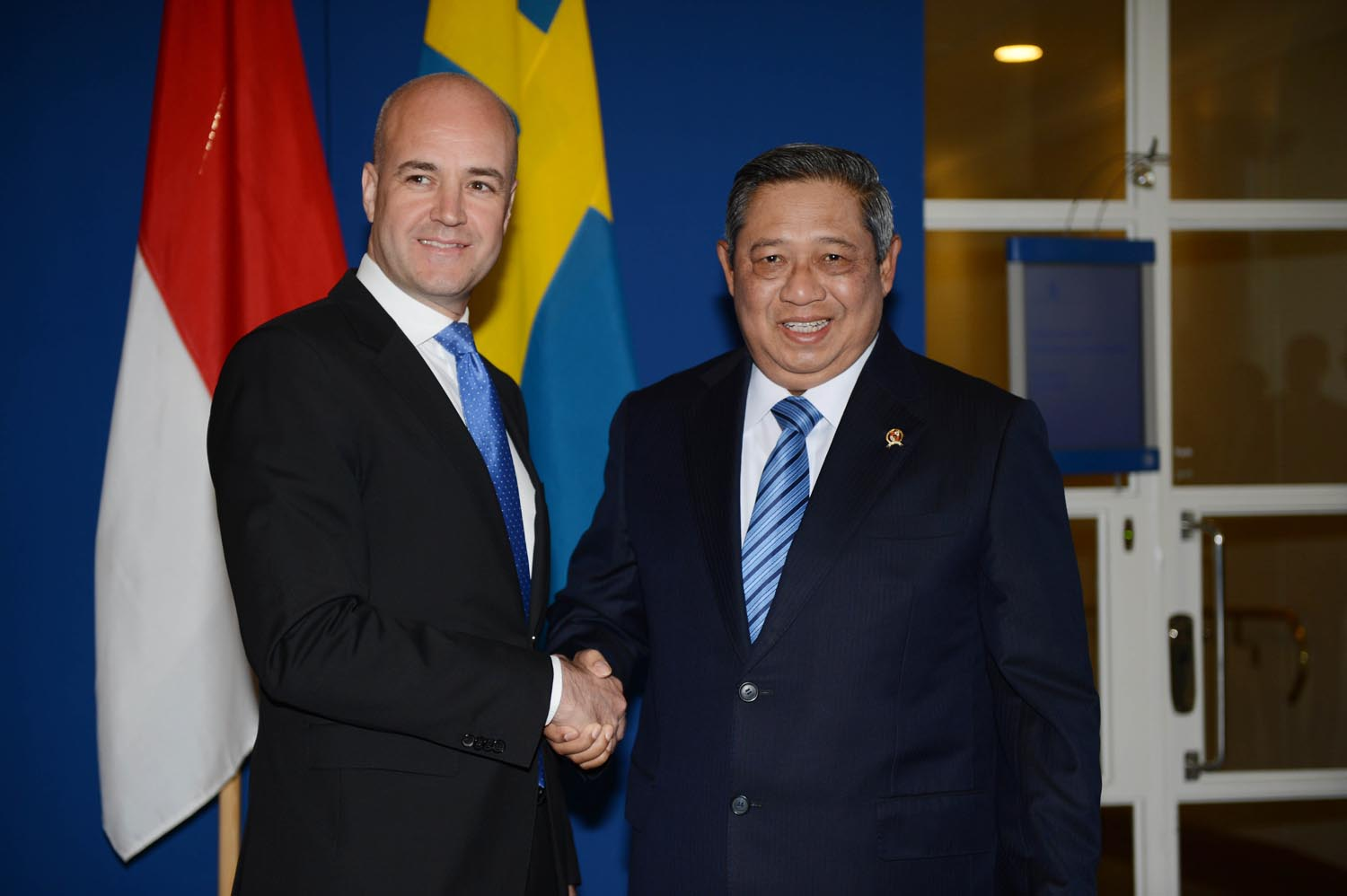
President Yudhoyono of Indonesia with Swedish PM Fredrik Reinfeldt in Stockholm, 28 May 2013.

In 2008, Swedish Foreign Minister Carl Bildt visited Jakarta. In early 2012, King Carl XVI Gustaf of Sweden visited Indonesia, it was the first ever by a Swedish monarch. In November 2012, Prime Minister Fredrik Reinfeldt followed suit, also the first ever visit by a Swedish head of government. The courtesy call reciprocated with Indonesian President Susilo Bambang Yudhoyono visits to Sweden on 27–29 May 2013.

== Agreements ==
The two countries have signed Memorandum of Understanding to strengthen bilateral cooperation on sustainable urban development, science, innovation and research, healthcare and environment. Indonesia is also keen to learn more from Swedish experience in maintaining its environment, such as developing renewable energy sources.

== Trade and investment ==
Sweden is one of Indonesia's most important trade partners in Europe, and its bilateral trade with Indonesia is the highest among Scandinavian countries. The trade volume between Indonesia-Sweden has reached US$1.05 billion in 2011 and grow to US$1.46 billion in 2012. In 2011 Swedish investment in Indonesia was stood around US$916,000 in 9 projects, in 2012 the figures rose to US$5.2 million in 11 projects. In 2021, Ambassador of Indonesia to Sweden introduced the Indonesian Investment Authority (INA), the first sovereign investment fund in Indonesia, responsible for supporting significant infrastructure projects in Indonesia. INA could be an opportunity to develop stronger economic cooperation with the support of many Swedish companies operating in the infrastructure and telecommunications sectors of Indonesia. The two countries also have been in favor of the ASEAN-EU relationship, which has escalated into a Strategic Partnership in December 2020. Sweden further provides support for the progress of the Indonesia-EU CEPA negotiations.

== See also ==
- Foreign relations of Indonesia
- Foreign relations of Sweden
