= New Zealand–Sweden relations =

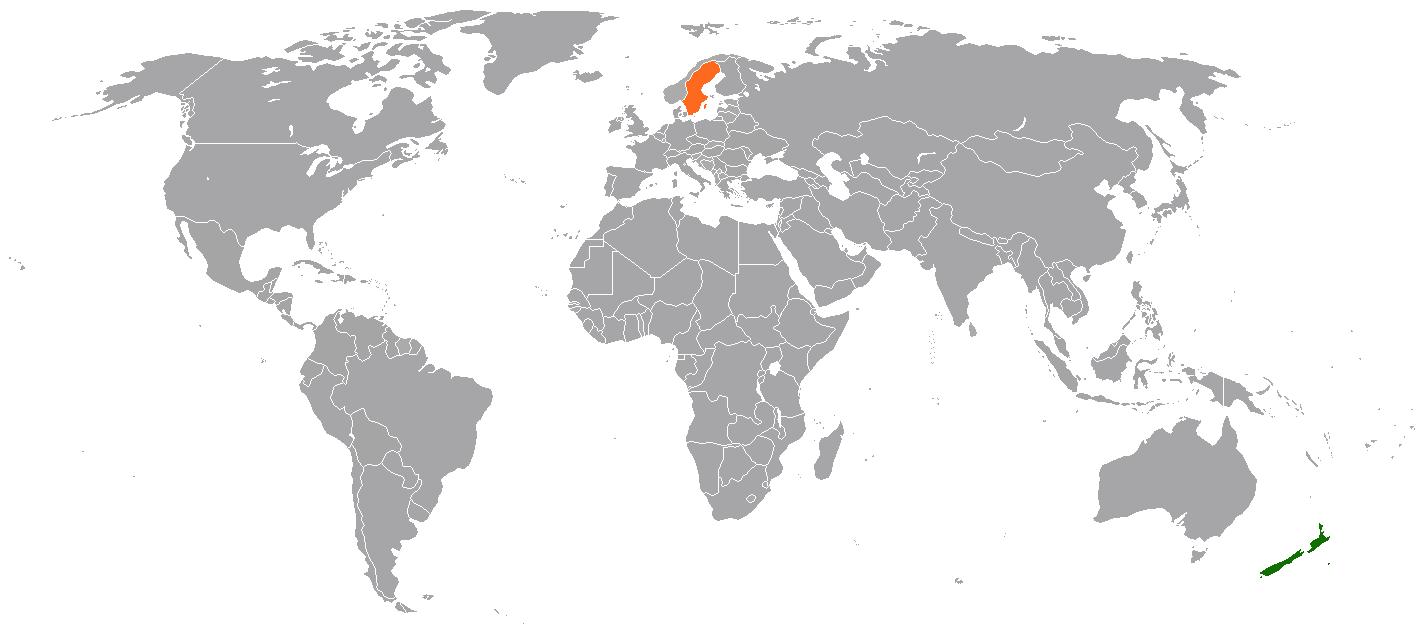

- New Zealand: Sweden

New Zealand–Sweden relations refers to the bilateral relationship between New Zealand and Sweden.

== Diplomatic relations ==
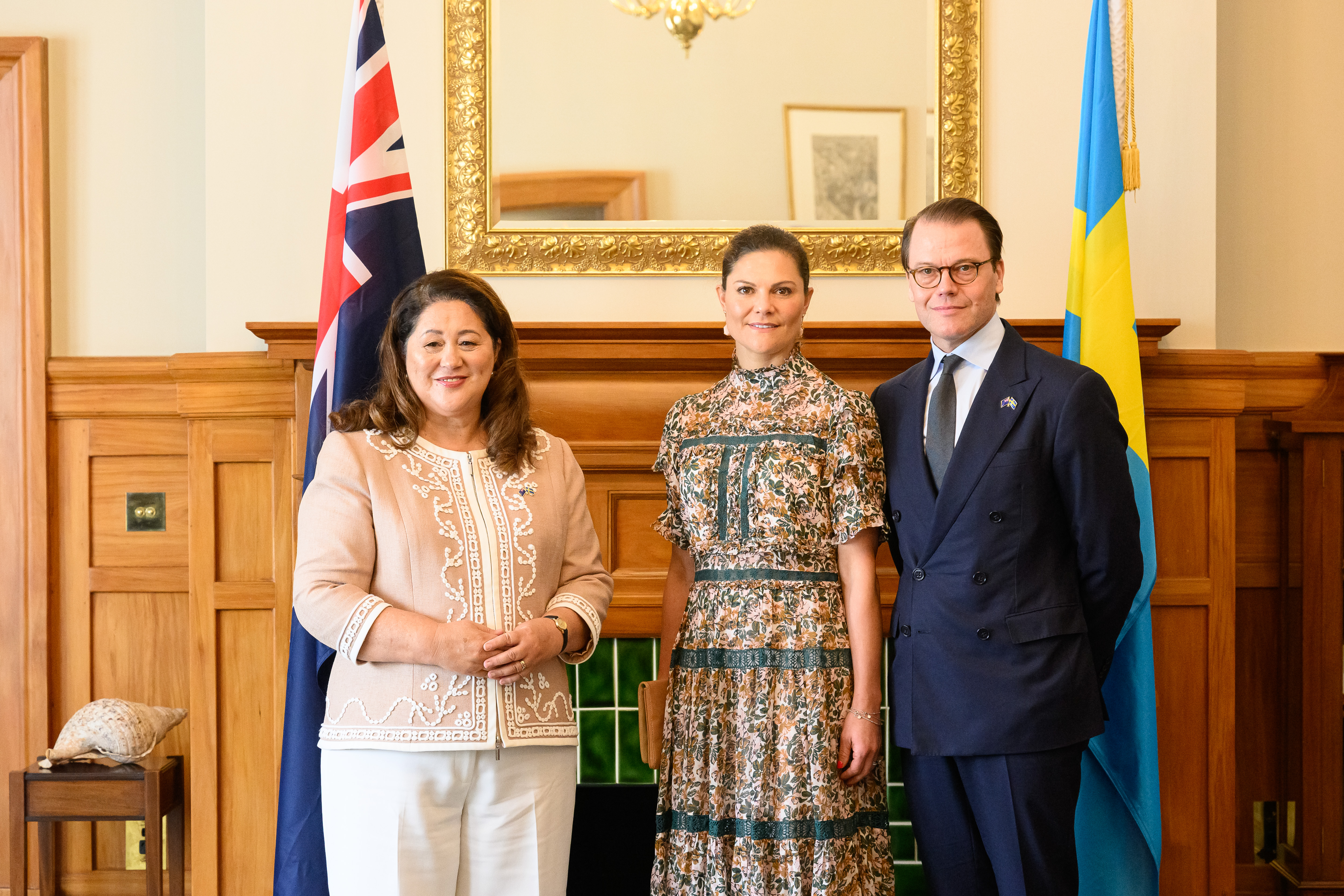
Victoria, Crown Princess of Sweden and Governor-General Cindy Kiro in Wellington in 2023

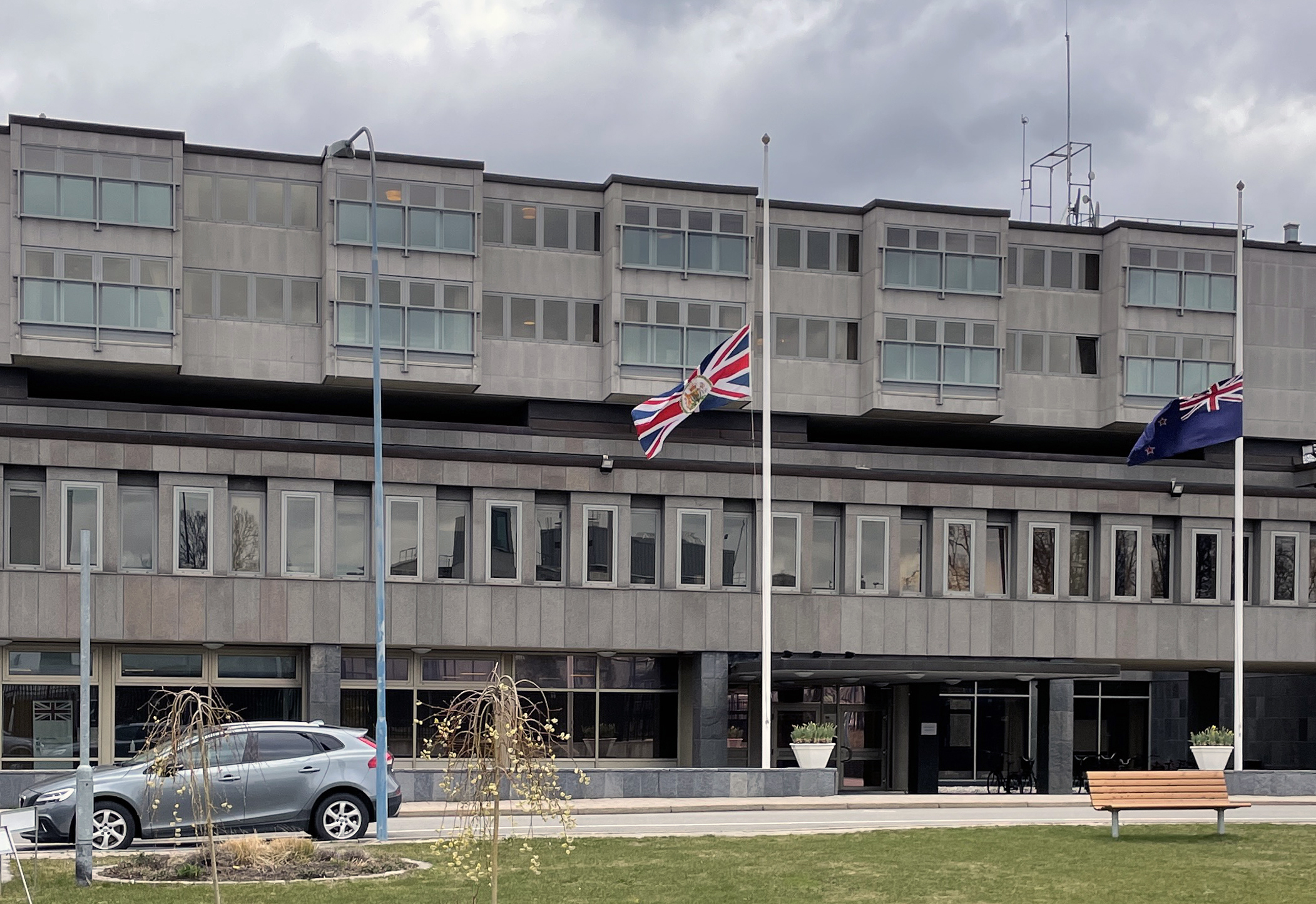
New Zealand embassy in Stockholm which is located in the British embassy.

New Zealand opened an embassy in Stockholm during 2008 which was closed on 1 July 2012 following a change of government, however, New Zealand re-opened its embassy in Stockholm in 2018, in the chancery of the British Embassy.

Sweden had an embassy in Wellington which closed down on 1 July 1995. Since then, the Swedish ambassador in Canberra, Australia is accredited to New Zealand.

The political relations as of 2013 were considered good. In addition to both being members of various multinational organisations and groups, the New Zealand and Swedish Governments cooperate through the Friends of Fossil Fuel Subsidy Reform and Global Research Alliance on Agricultural Greenhouse Gases. A working holiday scheme between the two countries has also been in place since 2001.

== Migration ==
During the 1870s, the New Zealand government used agents to recruit migrants from across Scandinavia. As of 1881, there were 1,264 Swedish-born people living in New Zealand, and this number expanded to 1,548 in 1901 before decreasing considerably over subsequent decades. Since 2001 there has been modest growth in the number of Swedes moving to New Zealand, with 1,353 people reporting being born in Sweden in the 2013 New Zealand Census. A further 1,401 New Zealanders recorded that they had Swedish ancestry. There are two Swedish associations in New Zealand: Svenska Föreningen Nya Zeeland, which is located in Auckland, and the Sweden-New Zealand Association Inc in Wellington.

As of 2001, 687 New Zealand-born people were residents of Sweden. There is a social club for New Zealanders living in Sweden, as well as two combined clubs for Australians and New Zealanders in the country.

== Trade ==
In 2014, the total value of international trade between New Zealand and Sweden was $NZ358 million. Of this, $NZ62 million was exports from New Zealand to Sweden, with the remainder being exports from Sweden to New Zealand.

In 2016, the New Zealand Scandinavian Business Association promoted commercial links between the two countries. The joint Swedish Government-private sector organisation Business Sweden also covers New Zealand from its office in Sydney, Australia.

== Resident diplomatic missions ==
- New Zealand has an embassy in Stockholm.
- Sweden is accredited to New Zealand from its embassy in Canberra, Australia.

== See also ==
- Foreign relations of New Zealand
- Foreign relations of Sweden
