= Embassy of the Democratic People's Republic of Korea, Stockholm =

Embassy of the Democratic People's Republic of Korea in Sweden

Embassy of the Democratic People's Republic of Korea in Sweden
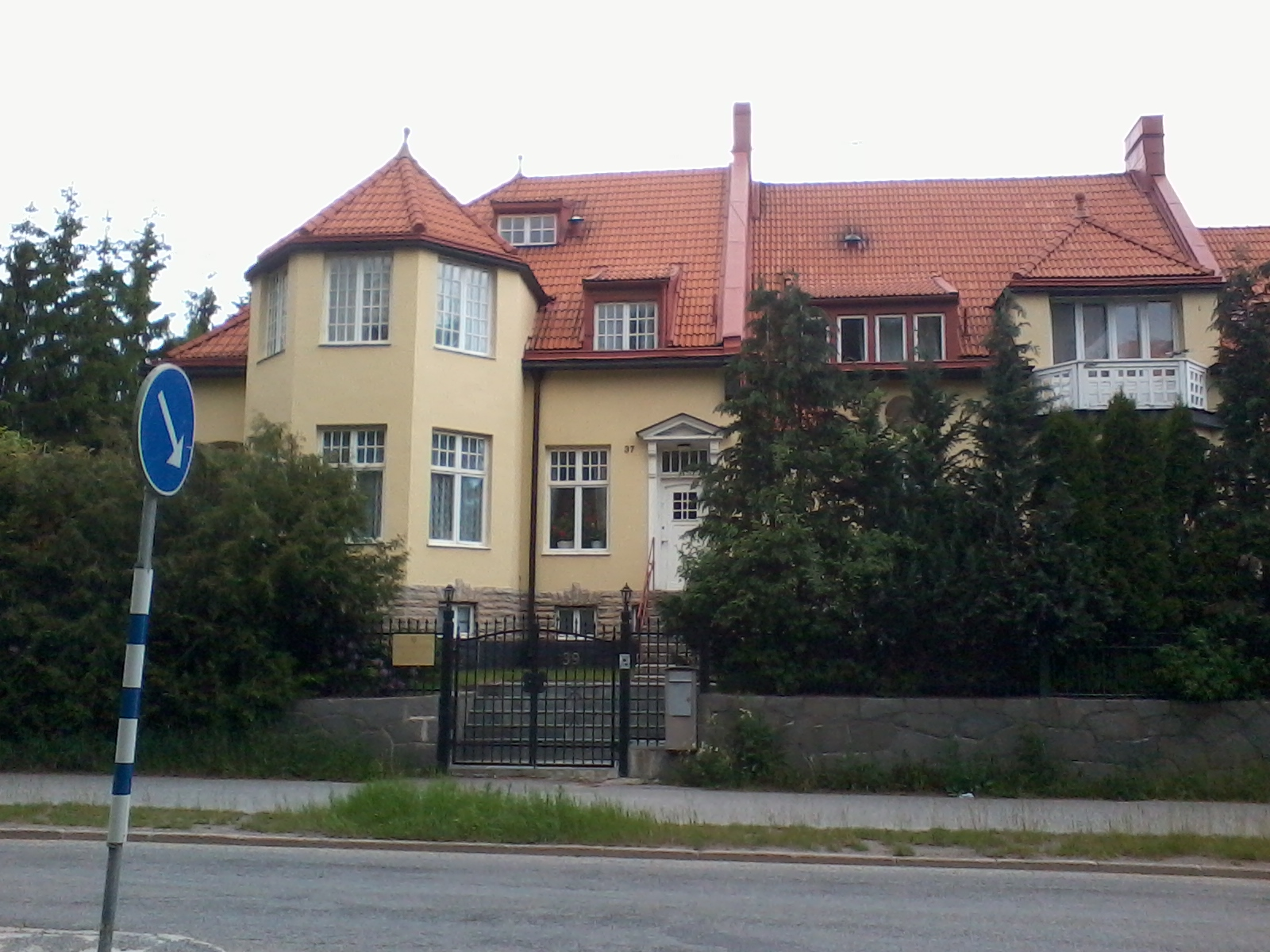
- Location: Stockholm
- Address: Norra Kungsvägen 39, Lidingö
- Coordinates: 59°22′16″N 18°07′57″E
- Opened: April 7, 1973
- Ambassador: Kim Chol Hae
- Jurisdiction: Sweden; Denmark; Norway; Finland; Iceland; Latvia; Lithuania

The Embassy of the Democratic People's Republic of Korea in Sweden (Swedish: Demokratiska folkrepubliken Koreas ambassad i Sverige) is the diplomatic mission of North Korea in Stockholm, Sweden. The embassy is representative of the government of North Korea in diplomatic matters. It also has a history as a point of contact between Pyongyang and other European countries. Its counsellor is Il Gwang Sim.

== History ==
=== Establishing diplomatic relations ===
The diplomatic relations between Sweden and North Korea were formally established on 7 April 1973. Sweden was one of the first countries from the Western bloc that recognized the state. It showed a strong willingness to maintain friendly relations with North Korea without joining any bloc.

=== Opening and role of the embassy ===
After establishing diplomatic relations, North Korea opened its embassy in Sweden in the 1970s. The embassy was involved in facilitating communication between the North Korean government and Sweden, as well as in managing cultural interaction between the two countries. Sweden has also served as a neutral mediator between North Korea and other countries during diplomatic talks.

== Controversies ==
The Embassy has attracted attention in Swedish media and internationally for several controversies related to activities of staff members at the North Korean embassy. All of these incidents are part of public information or political discourse rather than officially being due to convictions.

=== Smuggling incidents ===
In the 1970s, Sweden expelled three North Korean diplomats from Stockholm for having detected that the country's embassy officials were engaging in the smuggling of substantial quantities of cigarettes and liquor into Sweden. In 1996, Sweden again expelled North Korean diplomats from Stockholm for a similar reason, when customs officials discovered that a van loaded with substantial quantities of cigarettes belonged to members of the North Korean embassy, thereby expelling them from the country. Cases of liquor, cigarettes, and narcotic smuggling took place in Nordic nations during this time.

=== Alleged sanctions-bust network ===
A documentary in 2020, The Mole: Undercover in North Korea, produced in Denmark, raised questions about the North Korean embassy in Sweden, suspected of operating within a network trying to circumvent UN sanctions on weaponry and other prohibited goods. The documentary showed footage of meetings involving persons associated with the embassy discussing illegal weapons sales, contraband, and the possible use of the embassy as a communication relay for these matters. This raised questions in the Swedish parliament and statements from the country's foreign relations ministry that the matters raised in the documentary were being taken seriously and investigated. The North Korean embassy disputed the allegations and claiming that the documentary was fabricated.

== See also ==
- North Korea-Sweden relations
- Foreign relations of North Korea
- Foreign relations of Sweden
