= Malaysia–Sweden relations =

- Malaysia: Sweden

Malaysia–Sweden relations refers to foreign relations between Malaysia and Sweden. Sweden has an embassy in Kuala Lumpur, and Malaysia has an embassy in Stockholm (also is accredited in Denmark, Iceland and Norway). As of 2009, 90 Swedish companies are present in Malaysia and about 450 Swedish citizens live in Malaysia. The number of Swedish citizens visiting Malaysia in 2011 was 44,138.

== History ==
Diplomatic relations between the two countries were established in 1958, following the country's independence in 1957 as the Federation of Malaya which later changed its name to Malaysia in 1963.

Sweden opened its embassy in 1976 in Kuala Lumpur to maintain a permanent diplomatic presence in Malaysia and a decade later in 1986, Malaysia opened its embassy in Stockholm to formalize diplomatic relations and strengthen bilateral cooperation between the two countries.

== Bilateral agreements ==
Malaysia and Sweden have in place a bilateral agreement concerning the mutual protection of investments signed at Kuala Lumpur on 3 March 1979. There is an agreement between the Government of the Kingdom of Sweden and the Government of Malaysia for Air Services between and beyond their respective territories, signed at Kuala Lumpur on 19 October 1967. The countries also have in place a bilateral agreement for the avoidance of double taxation and prevention of fiscal evasion with respect to taxes on income.

== Economic relations ==
Between January and July 2012, bilateral trade stood at RM2 billion, increased from the trade at RM1.9 billion between January and June 2011. In September 2012, Malaysian Ambassador to Sweden, Datuk Badruddin Ab Rahman, said about 120 Swedish companies operate in Malaysia, with an investment of more than RM10 million, however there are no Malaysian companies operating in Sweden. The Malaysian embassy in Sweden makes programmes to attract Swedish businesses to Malaysia such as a briefing on investment opportunities in Malaysia.

In 2006, Swedish exports to Malaysia totalled approximately RM1.6 billion and the imports from Malaysia approximately RM0.7 billion. Swedish exports to Malaysia consist of telecommunication equipment, motor vehicles, chemical products, power generating machinery and equipment, machines, paper, as well as iron ore and steel. Swedish imports from Malaysia electronics and electrical components, machinery and apparatus, textiles, palm oil and raw rubber.

Volvo operates a wholly owned subsidiary in Malaysia that manufactures trucks. Until 2016, Swedish investors have recorded 90 manufacturing projects worth US$729.19 million in Malaysia and generated 5,800 jobs at various levels. The overall investments from 1980 until June 2017 are amounted to RM2.6 billion with Swedish investment in Malaysia is expected to hit RM200 million. The nature attractions in Sabah have become the main destinations among Swedish tourists with many islands in the state are frequently visited by visitors from Sweden.

== State visits ==
Malaysian Prime Minister Mahathir Mohamad made official visits to Sweden in both 1985 and 2003.

In 2005, the Yang di-Pertuan Agong (King) Sirajuddin of Perlis of Malaysia and Raja Permaisuri Agong (Queen) Tengku Fauziah of Perlis visited Sweden.

== Security relations ==
In 2000, the Swedish Navy agreed to loan four assault boats to Malaysia Government to "beef up security" in waters off Malaysia's state of Sabah.

== Issues ==
=== Kidnapping of Swedish diplomat by Japanese Red Army in Malaysia ===
In 1975, members of the Japanese Red Army kidnapped Swedish Chargé d'Affaires Fredrik Bergenstråhle and his secretary Ulla Ödqvist in Kuala Lumpur. One of the Malaysian officials, Tan Sri Osman S. Cassim, was later awarded the insignia of Commander of the Royal Order of the Polar Star by Sweden for his actions during the rescue.

=== Malaysian Stockholm director child custody issue ===
In 2014, the Stockholm director of the Malaysian tourist board and his wife were held in custody for over a month while their four children allocated to non-Muslim foster parents after the couple were accused of using corporal punishment on their 12-year-old son for refusing to perform his prayers, a practice which is outlawed in Sweden. The child was finally returned by Swedish authorities to Malaysia on 31 January 2014.

== Resident diplomatic missions ==
- Malaysia has an embassy in Stockholm.
- Sweden has an embassy in Kuala Lumpur.

== See also ==
- Foreign relations of Malaysia
- Foreign relations of Sweden
- Malaysia–EU relations
- ASEAN-EU relations
