= Embassy of the United Kingdom, Stockholm =

Coordinates: 59.3343°N 18.1078°E

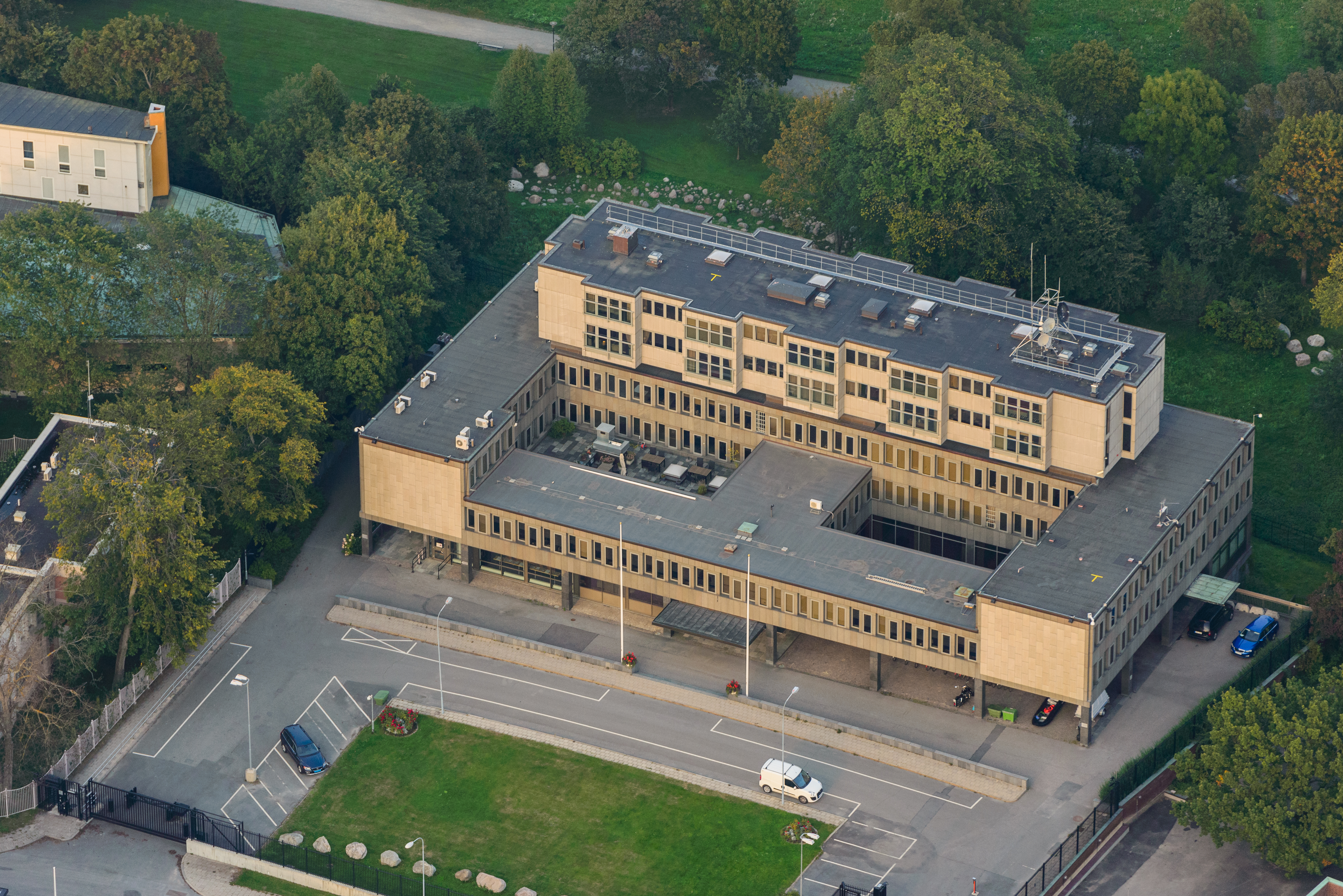
- The Embassy building in Stockholm
- Location: Stockholm, Sweden
- Address: Skarpögatan 6-8, 115 93 Stockholm, Sweden
- Ambassador: Samantha Job
- Website: British Embassy, Stockholm

The Embassy of the United Kingdom in Stockholm is the chief diplomatic mission of the United Kingdom in Sweden. The embassy also represents the British Overseas Territories in Sweden. It is located on Skarpögatan in the Diplomatstaden neighbourhood. The current British Ambassador to Sweden is Samantha Job.

== History ==
Great Britain established a diplomatic mission in Stockholm in 1720. The current embassy building located at Skarpögatan 6-8, was opened in 1967 and was designed by the architect William S. Bryant. Since 2018, the building has also housed the New Zealand Embassy to Sweden.

The British Ambassador's residence, which was built between 1914 and 1915 and was designed by Richard Allison, is located in the same area as the embassy, at Laboratoriegatan 8. Until 1939 it also served as the British Embassy.

Gallery

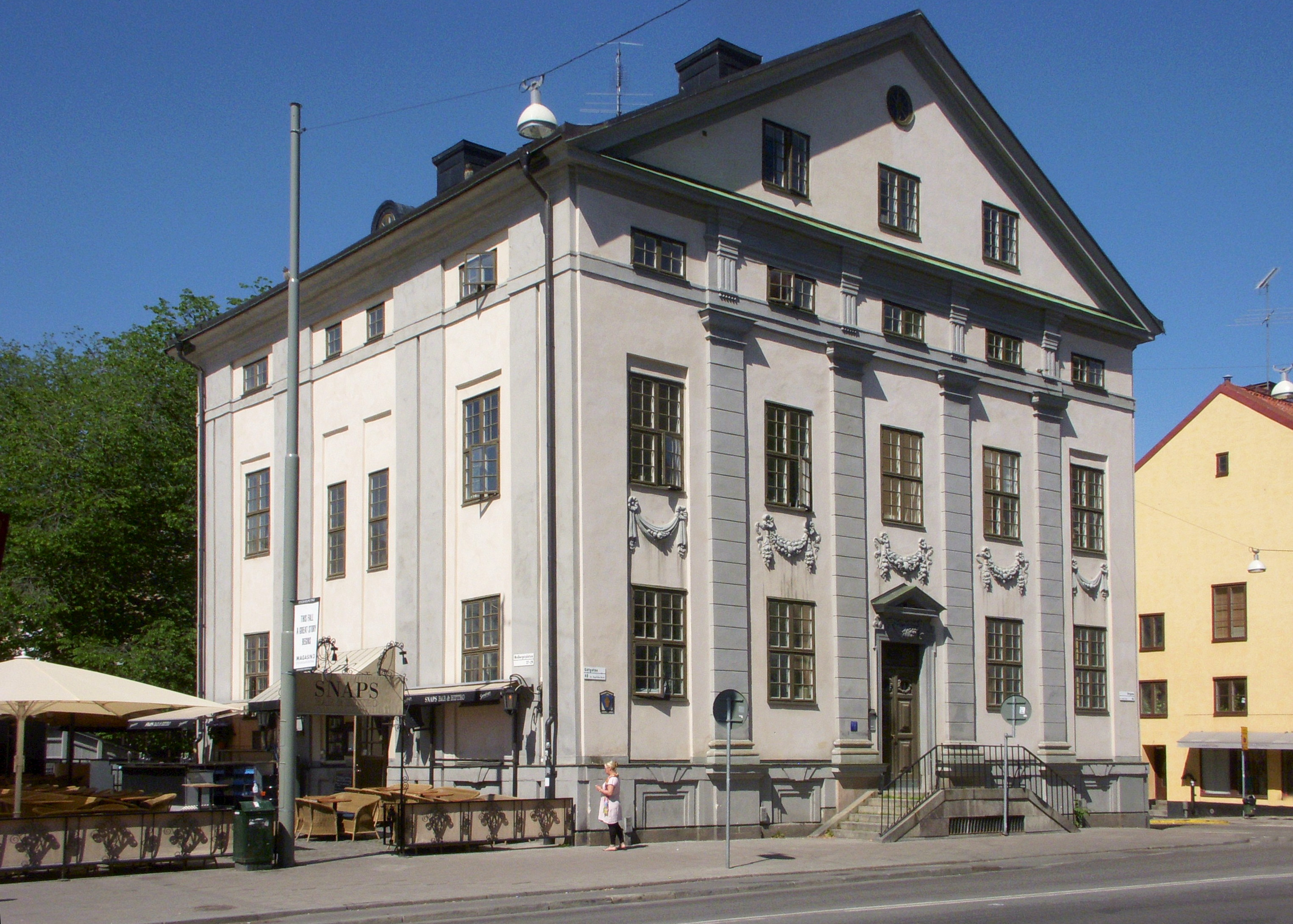
Lillienhoff Palace, British Embassy 1723–unknown

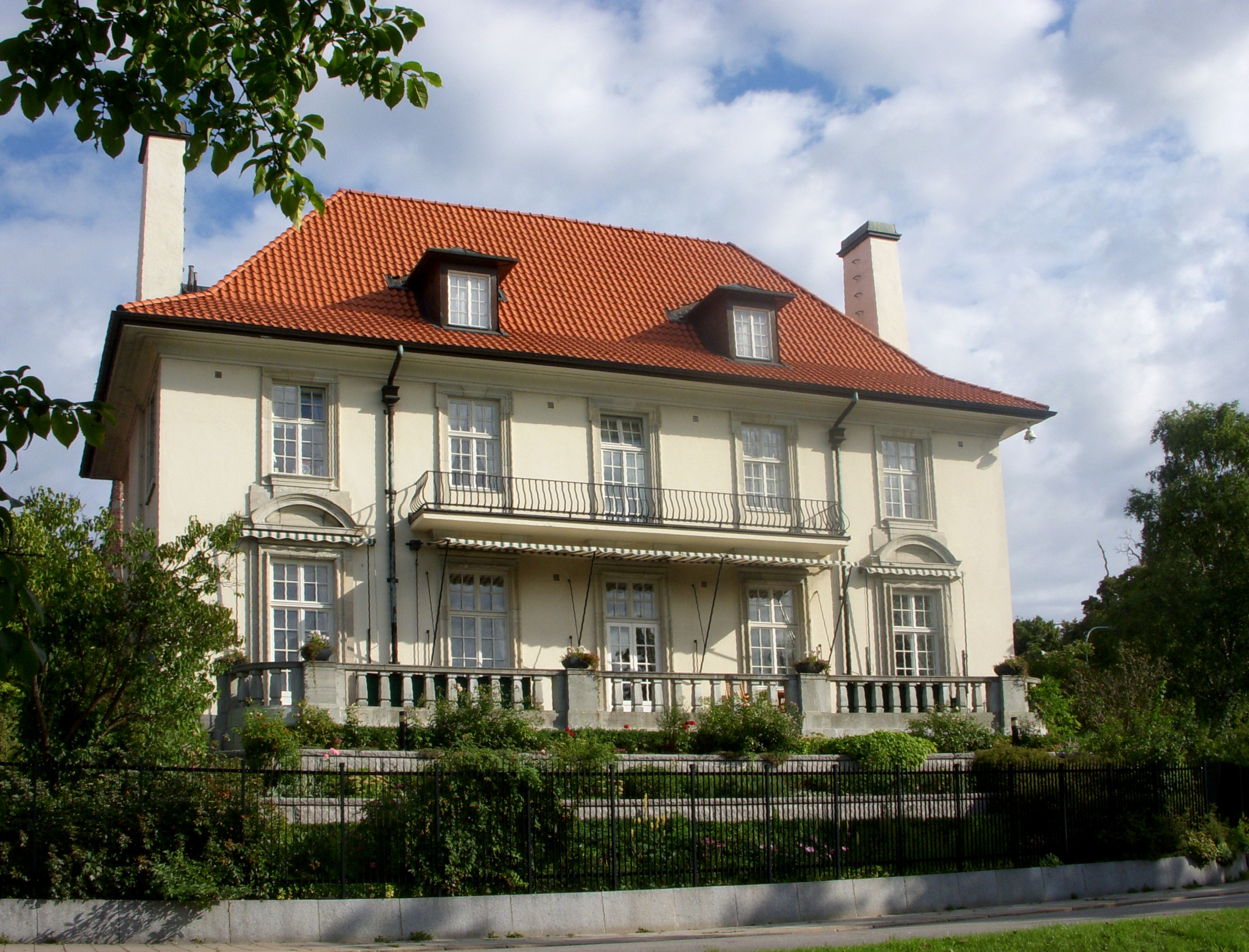
Current British Ambassador's residence and previously British Embassy 1915–1939

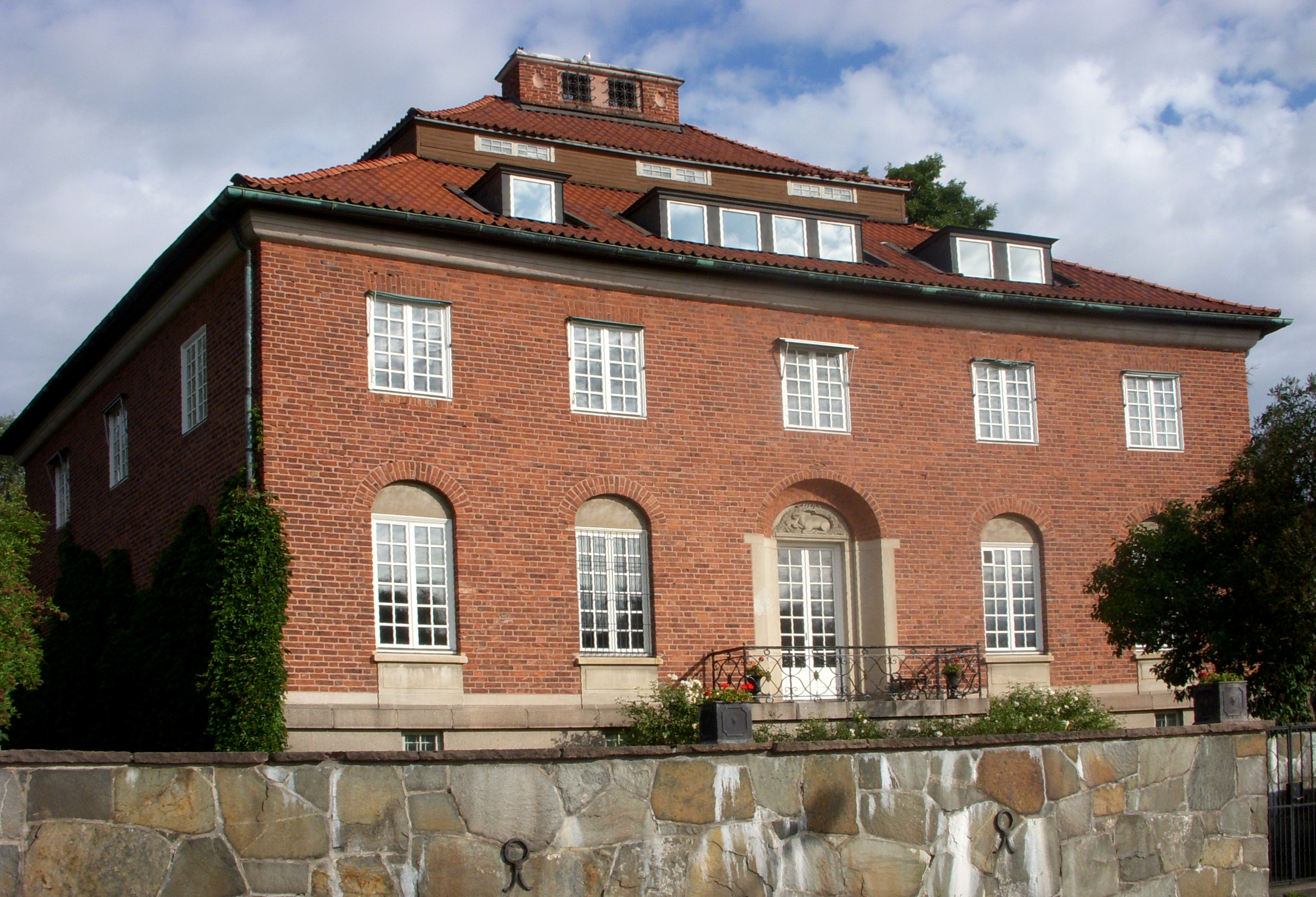
British Embassy, 1939–1967

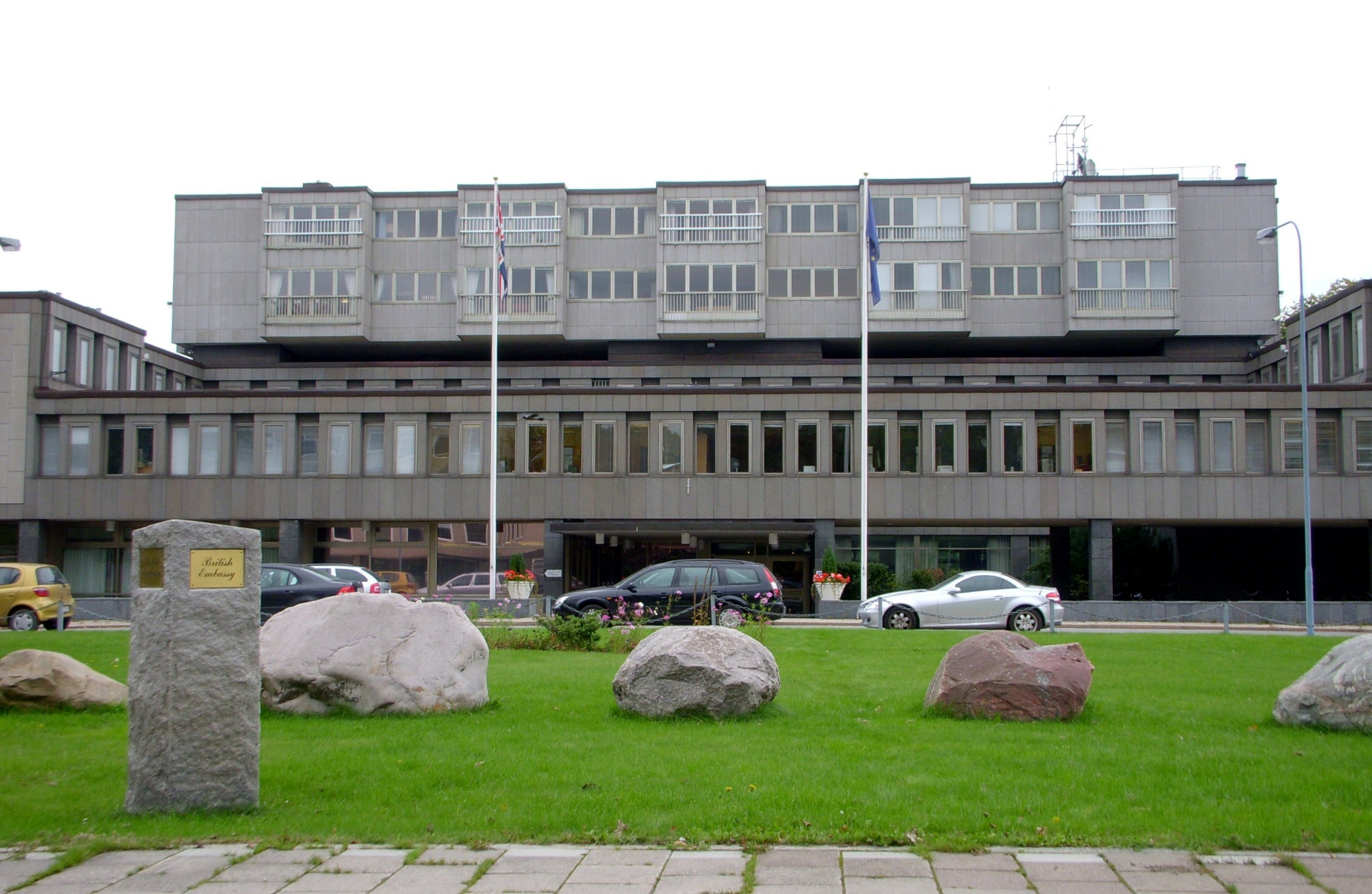
British Embassy, 1967–present

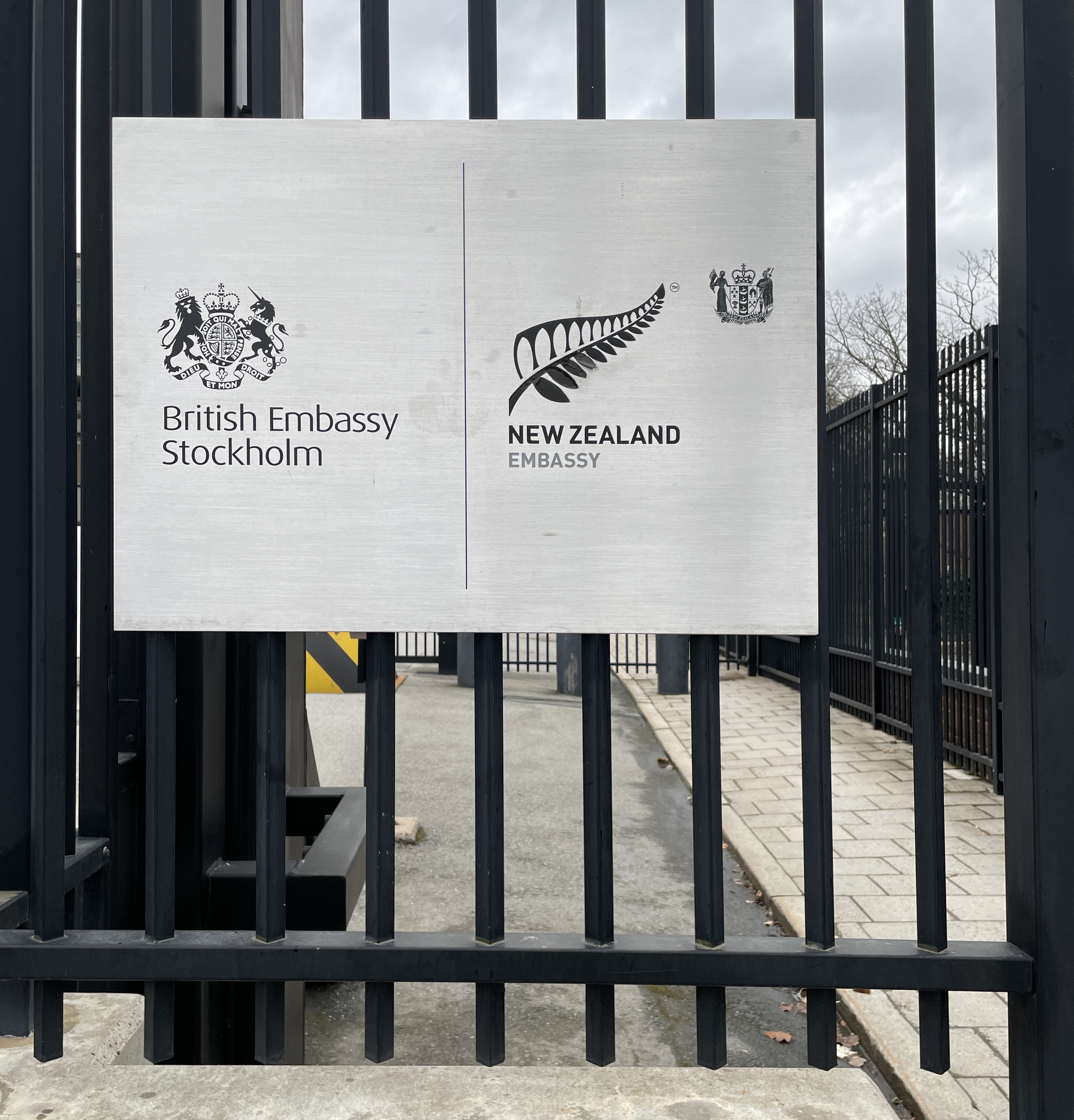
Embassy Signage

== See also ==
- Sweden–United Kingdom relations
- Embassy of Sweden, London
- List of diplomatic missions in Sweden
- List of ambassadors of the United Kingdom to Sweden
