= Embassy of Sweden, Pyongyang =

Diplomatic mission of Sweden in North Korea

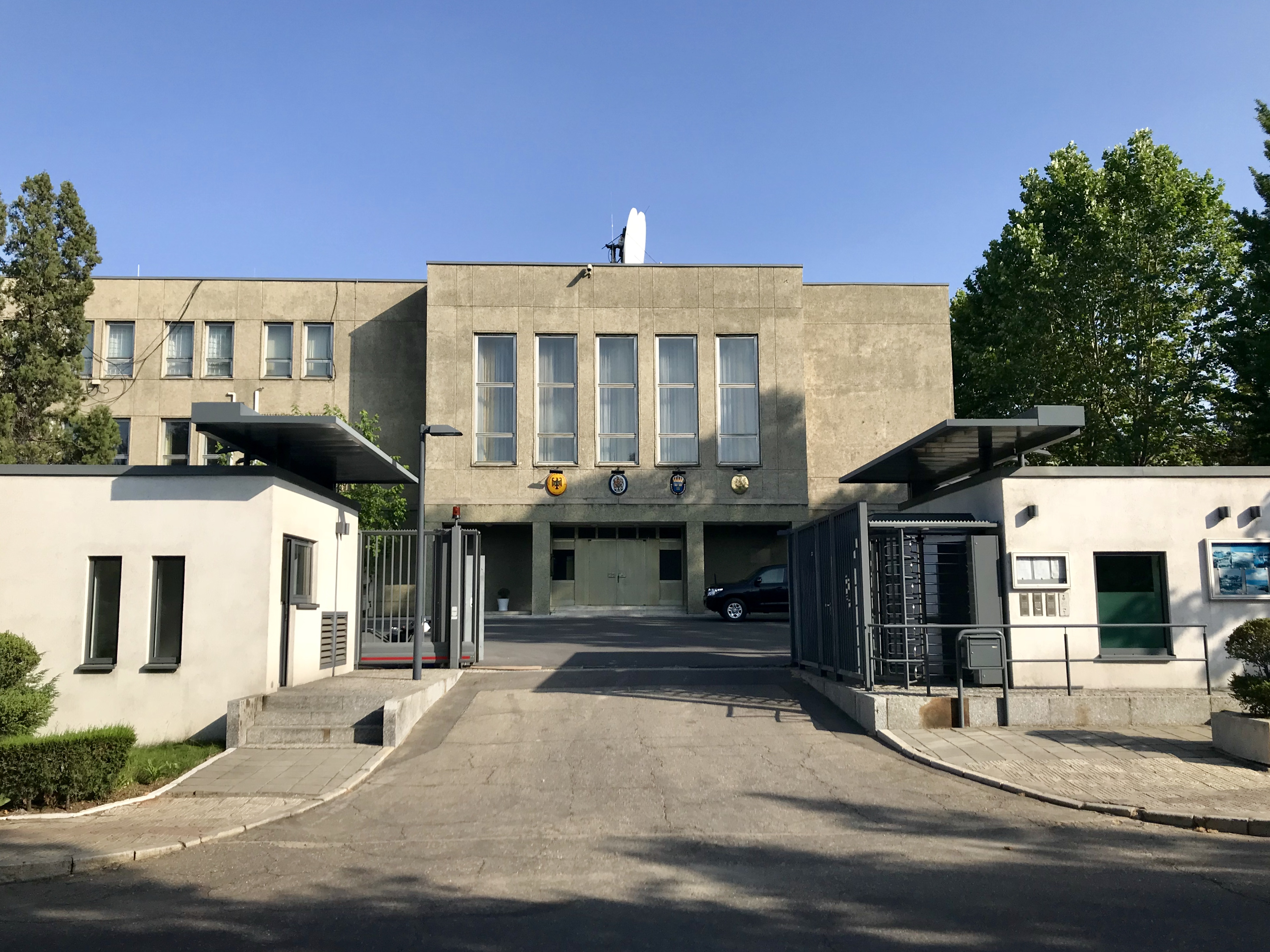
- The chancery housing the German, Swedish, British, and French embassies in Pyongyang
- Location: Pyongyang
- Address: Munsudong 3 Taedonggang District; Pyongyang; Democratic People's Republic of Korea
- Coordinates: 39.02310°N 125.79213°E
- Opening: 1975
- Ambassador: Josef Ahlberg
- Jurisdiction: North Korea
- Website: Official website

The Swedish Embassy in Pyongyang is Sweden's diplomatic mission in North Korea, which is located in the country's capital Pyongyang. The Swedish Embassy was one of the first embassies in North Korea, opening in 1975. The ambassador is Josef Ahlberg. Until 2001, Sweden was the only Western country with uninterrupted diplomatic representation in the city. The Swedish embassy serves as the protecting power for the United States and as consular representation for Australia, Canada, Italy, Latvia, Iceland and Finland.

== History ==
The Swedish government recognized North Korea in the council on 6 April 1973. According to the government's assessment, recognizing both Korean states would significantly contribute to easing tensions in the region. Foreign Minister Krister Wickman commented on the decision by stating that there was Nordic consensus on the issue, which had been agreed upon at the Nordic foreign ministers' meeting the previous month. On 8 April 1973, North Korea declared that it had received and accepted Sweden's proposal to establish diplomatic relations between the two countries. The official North Korean news agency announced that Foreign Minister Ho Dam, in his response to the message from Foreign Minister Wickman, stated, "On behalf of the government of the Democratic People's Republic of Korea, I have the honor to inform you that it agrees to your government's proposal to establish diplomatic relations between the DPRK and Sweden." Sweden's ambassador to China, Arne Björnberg, was accredited in Pyongyang in May 1973.

The embassy was opened in 1975 and the first ambassador with the title chargé d'affaires was Erik Cornell (1975–1977). After North Korea, on 6 November 1975, requested that Australia close its embassy in Pyongyang, claiming it had engaged in "systematic subversive activities" against North Korea, Australia's ambassador to Sweden approached the Swedish Ministry for Foreign Affairs in Stockholm, asking if Sweden would serve as Australia's protecting power in Pyongyang, to which Sweden agreed. Since 1995, Sweden has acted as the protecting power for the United States in North Korea. Until 2001, Sweden was the only western country with an unbroken diplomatic presence in North Korea.

The Swedish embassy in Pyongyang is today co-located with the French, British embassy and the German embassy. The chancery is the former embassy building for East Germany, originally shared with only Germany and the Italian aid agency, with the British later joining in 2001. On September 16, 2010, Barbro Elm handed over her letter of credence to North Korean President Kim Yong-nam. On 9 December 2010, the Government Offices announced that the embassy was in danger of being closed down due to the cuts to be made to the Government Offices' costs. On 26 April 2012, Karl-Olof Andersson, current Rector of the Ministry of Foreign Affairs' diplomatic program and secretary of the Ministry of Foreign Affairs' Admissions Committee, was appointed new ambassador in the autumn of 2012. On 2 October 2012, Andersson handed over his credentials to Kim Yong-nam in a ceremony that took place in the Mansudae Congress Hall.

Due to the COVID-19 pandemic, the diplomats were temporarily withdrawn in 2020. The embassy remained open and was staffed by local employees. In September 2024, Swedish diplomats have returned to the embassy. This made Sweden the first Western country to resume regular diplomatic operations in North Korea since the pandemic.

== See also ==
- List of diplomatic missions in North Korea
- List of diplomatic missions of Sweden
