= List of ambassadors of Sweden to Bahrain =

Ambassador of Sweden to Bahrain
- Lesser coat of arms of the Kingdom of Sweden

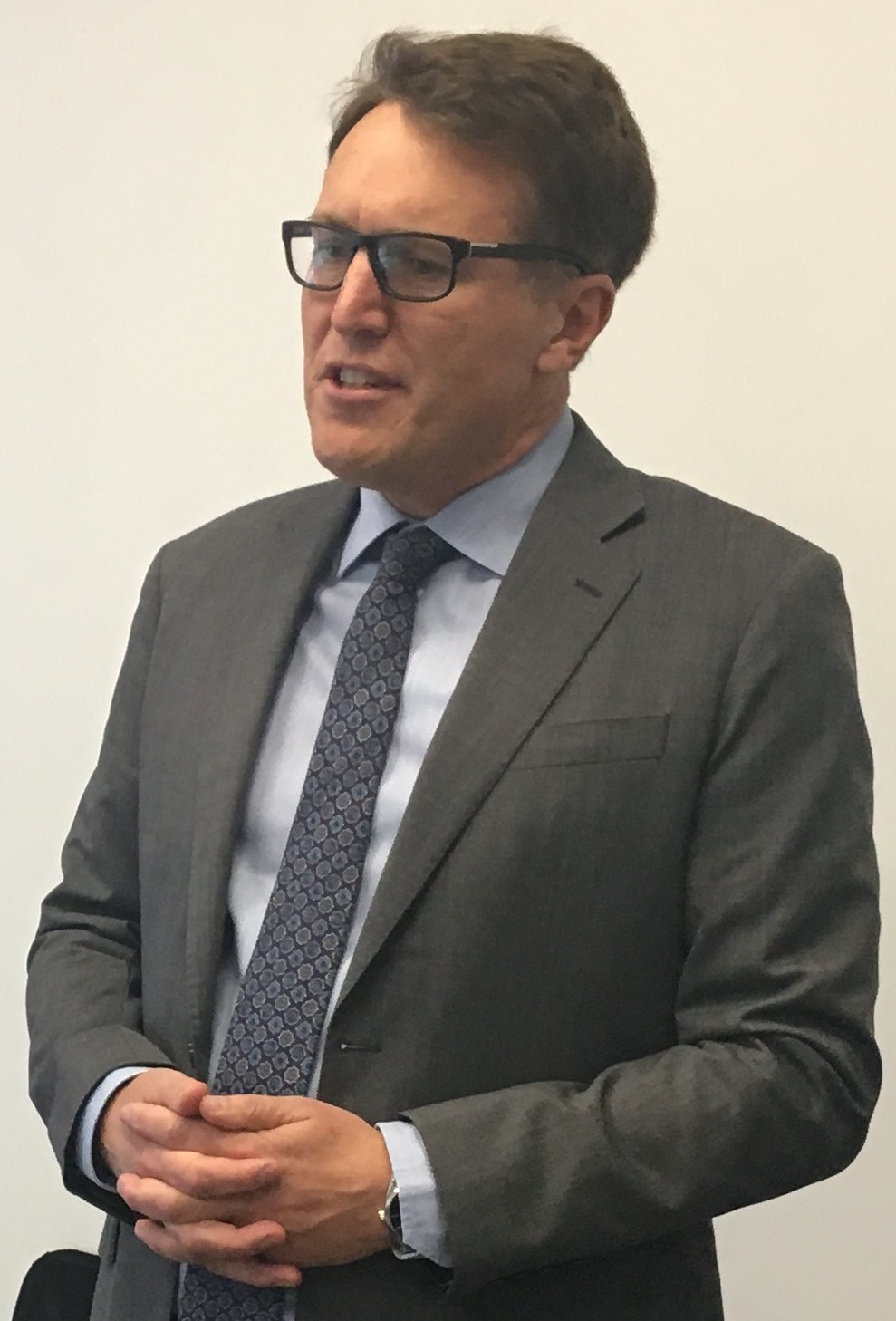
- Incumbent; Fredrik Florén since September 2023
- Ministry for Foreign Affairs; Swedish Embassy, Abu Dhabi
- Style: His or Her Excellency (formal); Mr. or Madam Ambassador (informal)
- Reports to: Minister for Foreign Affairs
- Seat: Abu Dhabi, United Arab Emirates (Note: Since 2002, the Swedish ambassador in Abu Dhabi, United Arab Emirates has a dual accreditation to Manama, Bahrain.)
- Appointer: Government of Sweden
- Term length: No fixed term
- Inaugural holder: Bengt Rösiö
- Formation: 1974

The Ambassador of Sweden to Bahrain (known formally as the Ambassador of the Kingdom of Sweden to the Kingdom of Bahrain) is the official representative of the government of Sweden to the king of Bahrain and cabinet of Bahrain. Since 2002, Sweden's ambassador to Bahrain has been resident in Abu Dhabi, United Arab Emirates with concurrent accreditation to Manama, the capital of Bahrain.

== History ==
On 25 February 1974, Sweden and Bahrain decided to establish diplomatic relations at ambassadorial level. The idea of the Swedish Ministry for Foreign Affairs was that the "Gulf Arab states" of Bahrain, Oman, the United Arab Emirates, Qatar, and Kuwait (where Sweden had a chargé d'affaires) would be brought together under Sweden's ambassador to Saudi Arabia in Jeddah.

On 18 November 1974, Sweden's ambassador to Saudi Arabia, Bengt Rösiö, presented his credentials to the Emir of Bahrain, Sheikh Isa bin Salman Al Khalifa. Rösiö thus became the first Swedish ambassador to be accredited to Bahrain.

After Sweden stationed a resident ambassador at the embassy in Kuwait City in 1977, accreditation for Bahrain was transferred from Sweden's ambassador to Saudi Arabia to Sweden's ambassador to Kuwait. Sweden closed its embassy in Kuwait City in 2001 and opened one in Abu Dhabi the following year. As a result, accreditation for Bahrain was taken over by Sweden's ambassador to the United Arab Emirates the same year.

== List of representatives ==
Name	Period	Title	Resident / Concurrent accreditation	Notes	Presented credentials	Ref
State of Bahrain (1971–2002)
Bengt Rösiö	1974–1977	Ambassador	Resident in Jeddah		18 November 1974	
Göran Bundy	1977–1980	Ambassador	Resident in Kuwait City			
Thord Bengtson	1980–1982	Ambassador	Resident in Kuwait City			
Carl-Gustav Åkesson	1983–1986	Ambassador	Resident in Kuwait City			
Ulf Norström	1987–1989	Ambassador	Resident in Kuwait City			
Ingolf Kiesow	1989–1991 (Note: Ingolf Kiesow was stationed in Kuwait City and also accredited to Manama. After the Iraqi invasion of Kuwait on 2 August 1990, Kiesow stayed in Kuwait City until he was forced to leave on 8 September, at which point he was stripped of his diplomatic immunity.)	Ambassador	Resident in Kuwait City			
Tommy Arwitz	1992–1997	Ambassador	Resident in Kuwait City			
Thomas Ganslandt	1997–2001	Ambassador	Resident in Kuwait City			
Kingdom of Bahrain (2002–present)
Lars-Erik Grundell	2002–2005	Ambassador	Resident in Abu Dhabi			
Bruno Beijer	2005–2010	Ambassador	Resident in Abu Dhabi			
Magnus Schöldtz	2010–2011	Ambassador	Resident in Abu Dhabi			
Max Bjuhr	2011–2014	Ambassador	Resident in Abu Dhabi			
Jan Thesleff	2014–2017	Ambassador	Resident in Abu Dhabi			
Henrik Landerholm	2017–2021	Ambassador	Resident in Abu Dhabi	Political appointee (non-career diplomat)		
Liselott Andersson	2021–2023	Ambassador	Resident in Abu Dhabi			
Fredrik Florén	2023–present	Ambassador	Resident in Abu Dhabi		22 April 2025	
