= Frank Belfrage =

Swedish economist and diplomat

State Secretary for Foreign Affairs
- In office 6 October 2006 – 3 October 2014
- Prime Minister: Fredrik Reinfeldt
- Minister: Carl Bildt
- Preceded by: Hans Dahlgren
- Succeeded by: Annika Söder

Ambassador of Sweden to France
- In office December 2001 – 6 October 2006
- Preceded by: Örjan Berner
- Succeeded by: Gunnar Lund

Permanent Representative of Sweden to the European Union
- In office 1994–1999
- Preceded by: Lars Anell
- Succeeded by: Gunnar Lund

Ambassador of Sweden to Saudi Arabia
- In office 1984–1987
- Preceded by: Fredrik Bergenstråhle
- Succeeded by: Lennart Alvin

Personal details
- Born: Frank Kurt Claude Belfrage; 13 March 1942 (age 84) Stockholm, Sweden
- Spouse: Helena Östberg (m. 1978)
- Education: Stockholm School of Economics

Frank Kurt Claude Belfrage (born 13 March 1942) is a Swedish economist and diplomat who was state secretary for foreign affairs between 2006 and 2014, heading the Ministry for Foreign Affairs under then Minister for Foreign Affairs Carl Bildt. He was previously Permanent Representative of Sweden to the European Union from 1994 to 1999 and Ambassador of Sweden to France from 2001 to 2006.

== Early life ==
Belfrage was born on 13 March 1942 in Stockholm, Sweden, the son of envoy Kurt-Allan Belfrage (1907–1991) and his wife Renée (née Puaux). His grandfather was the stock exchange director Kurt Belfrage (1878–1951), his great-grandfather was the physician Axel Belfrage (1844–1922), and his uncle was the diplomat Leif Belfrage (1910–1990).

Belfrage graduated from the Stockholm School of Economics in 1965.

== Career ==
Belfrage served as an attaché at the Swedish Embassy in Vienna in 1966 and as embassy secretary at Sweden's UN representation in New York City in 1968. In 1971, he became a desk officer (departementssekreterare) at the Ministry for Foreign Affairs and was appointed director (departementsråd) there in 1975. He served as trade counselor at the Swedish Embassy in London in 1977 and was promoted to minister there in 1981. In 1984, he became ambassador to Riyadh, Muscat, and Sanaa. He later served as ambassador at the Ministry for Foreign Affairs, heading the bilateral trade unit from 1987 to 1988, followed by leading the Western Europe unit from 1988 to 1991. From 1991 to 1994, he was state secretary at the ministry's trade department. He then served as Permanent Representative of Sweden to the European Union in Brussels from 1994 to 1999 before becoming director general for EU affairs (utrikesråd) at the Ministry for Foreign Affairs in 1999.

Belfrage later served as ambassador to Paris from 2001 to 2006 and as state secretary for foreign affairs from 2006 to 2014.

== Personal life ==
Belfrage married 1978 to Helena Östberg (born 1947), the daughter of Jan Erik Östberg and Britta (née Sedell).

Belfrage was part of the 2016 SVT documentary Springnotan revealing to the Swedish people how some of their political leaders hid money from tax authorities. Belfrage used a temporary tax amnesty, avoiding imprisonment, where his name was revealed.

== Awards ==
- (Sweden) H. M. The King's Medal, 12th size gold medal on Seraphim Order ribbon
- (Portugal) Grand Officer of the Order of Prince Henry (15 May 1991)
- (France) Commander of the Legion of Honour
- Decoration of Honour in Gold for Services to the Republic of Austria (1968)

== See also ==
- List of people named in the Panama Papers

Diplomatic posts
Preceded by Fredrik Bergenstråhle	Ambassador of Sweden to Saudi Arabia; 1984–1987	Succeeded by Lennart Alvin
Preceded by Fredrik Bergenstråhle	Ambassador of Sweden to Oman; 1984–1987	Succeeded by Lennart Alvin
Preceded by Fredrik Bergenstråhle	Ambassador of Sweden to North Yemen; 1984–1987	Succeeded by Lennart Alvin
Preceded by Lars Anell	Permanent Representative of Sweden to the European Union; 1994–1999	Succeeded by Gunnar Lund
Preceded by Örjan Berner	Ambassador of Sweden to France; 2001–2006	Succeeded by Gunnar Lund
Preceded by Hans Dahlgren	State Secretary for Foreign Affairs; 2006–2014	Succeeded by Annika Söder
