= List of ambassadors of Sweden to Oman =

Ambassador of Sweden to Oman
- Lesser coat of arms of the Kingdom of Sweden

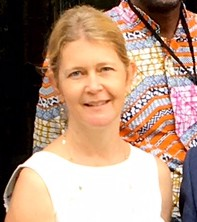
- Incumbent; Maria Håkansson since August 2026
- Ministry for Foreign Affairs; Swedish Embassy, Riyadh
- Style: His or Her Excellency (formal); Mr. or Madam Ambassador (informal)
- Reports to: Minister for Foreign Affairs
- Seat: Riyadh, Saudi Arabia (Note: The Swedish ambassador in Riyadh, United Arab Emirates has a dual accreditation to Muscat, Oman.)
- Appointer: Government of Sweden
- Term length: No fixed term
- Inaugural holder: Bengt Rösiö
- Formation: 1974

The Ambassador of Sweden to Oman (known formally as the Ambassador of the Kingdom of Sweden to the Sultanate of Oman) is the official representative of the government of Sweden to the Sultan and Prime Minister of Oman and government of Oman. Sweden's ambassador to Oman is resident in Riyadh, Saudi Arabia with concurrent accreditation to Muscat, the capital of Oman.

== History ==
Sweden and Oman established diplomatic relations on 15 March 1974. Ambassador Bengt Rösiö, based in Jeddah, the capital of Saudi Arabia, was concurrently accredited to Muscat, Oman. Since then, Sweden's ambassador to Oman has been resident in Saudi Arabia, first in Jeddah and, from the mid-1980s, in Riyadh.

In 1986, Sweden opened an embassy office in Oman's capital, Muscat. The office was headed by a chargé d'affaires ad interim with the diplomatic rank of first embassy secretary. The head of the embassy office was Sweden's ambassador in Riyadh, who was accredited to Muscat. On 10 September 1992, the Swedish government decided, for budgetary reasons, to close the embassy office in Muscat. The embassy office was expected to be fully wound down by the end of February 1993.

== List of representatives ==
Name	Period	Title	Resident / Concurrent accreditation	Notes	Presented credentials	Ref
Bengt Rösiö	1974–1977	Ambassador	Resident in Jeddah			
Carl-Gustaf Bielke	1977–1980	Ambassador	Resident in Jeddah			
Fredrik Bergenstråhle	1980–1984	Ambassador	Resident in Jeddah			
Frank Belfrage	1984–1987	Ambassador	Resident in Riyadh			
Åke Karlsson	1986–1990	Chargé d'affaires ad interim (Note: Held the diplomatic rank of first embassy secretary.)				
Lennart Alvin	1987–1991	Ambassador	Resident in Riyadh			
Kenneth Bertilsson	1990–1993	Chargé d'affaires ad interim (Note: Held the diplomatic rank of embassy counsellor.)				
Steen Hohwü-Christensen	1991–1996	Ambassador	Resident in Riyadh			
Lave Johnsson	1996–2000	Ambassador	Resident in Riyadh			
Åke Karlsson	2001–2006	Ambassador	Resident in Riyadh			
Jan Thesleff	2006–2011	Ambassador	Resident in Riyadh			
Dag Juhlin-Dannfelt	September 2011 – August 2016	Ambassador	Resident in Riyadh			
Jan Knutsson	September 2016 – 2019	Ambassador	Resident in Riyadh		25 January 2017 (Note: Presented credentials to Foreign Minister Yusuf bin Alawi.)	
Niclas Trouvé	1 September 2019 – 2022	Ambassador	Resident in Riyadh		17 February 2021	
Petra Menander	September 2022 – 2026	Ambassador	Resident in Riyadh		20 June 2023	
Maria Håkansson	August 2026 – present	Ambassador	Resident in Riyadh			
