= Karin Enström =

Swedish politician (born 1966)

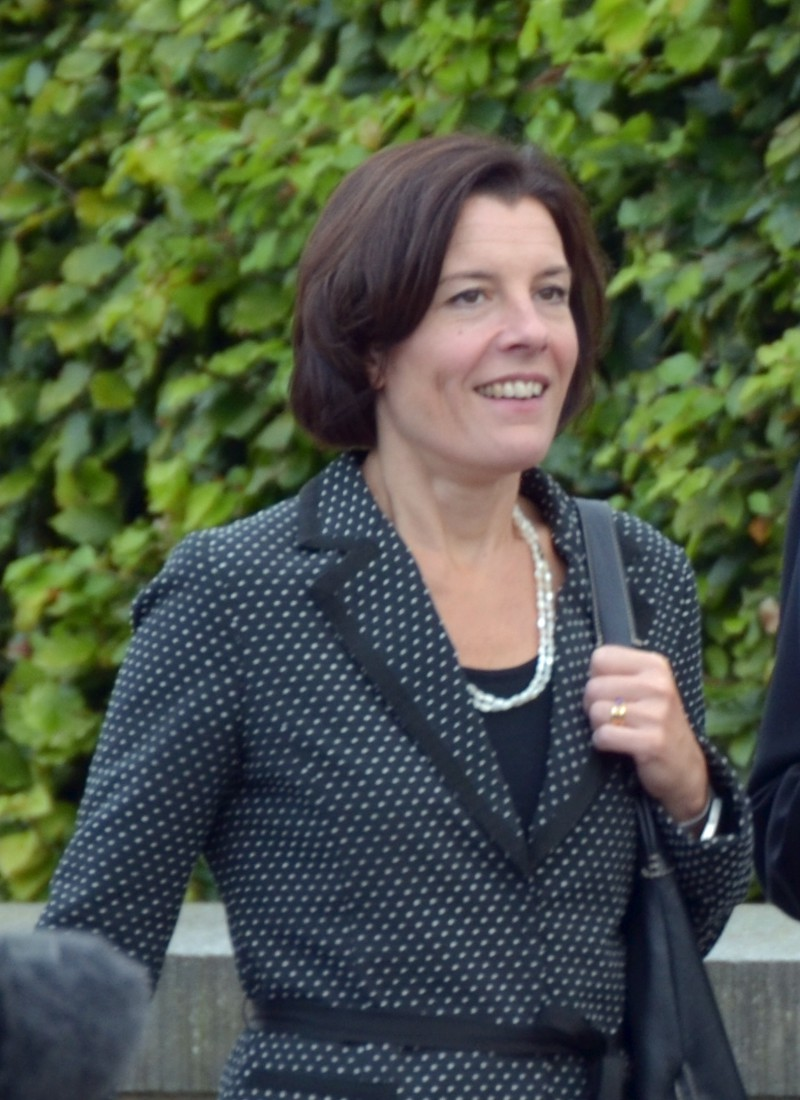

Secretary-General of the Moderate Party
- Incumbent
- Assumed office 19 October 2022
- Leader: Ulf Kristersson
- Preceded by: Gunnar Strömmer

Minister for Defence
- In office 18 April 2012 – 3 October 2014
- Prime Minister: Fredrik Reinfeldt
- Preceded by: Sten Tolgfors
- Succeeded by: Peter Hultqvist

Member of the Riksdag
- Incumbent
- Assumed office 1998
- Constituency: Stockholm County

Personal details
- Born: 23 March 1966 (age 60) Uppsala, Sweden
- Party: Moderate Party
- Spouse: Anders Enström
- Relations: Henrik Landerholm (brother); Per Bill (brother-in-law); Alice Landerholm (niece)
- Children: 3
- Occupation: Amphibious Corps officer Politician

Karin Märta Elisabeth Enström (born Landerholm 23 March 1966) is a Swedish politician of the Moderate Party. She has served as Secretary-General of the Moderate Party since October 2022 and has been a Member of the Riksdag since the 1998 general election, representing Stockholm County. She served as Minister for Defence in the cabinet of Fredrik Reinfeldt from 2012 to 2014. She is an Amphibious Corps officer by profession.

== Political career ==
Enström has been a member of the Riksdag since 1998, representing Stockholm County. She was a member of the Defense Committee from 2002 to 2010, serving as its Chairman from 2008. After the 2010 general election she was appointed as Chairman of the Committee on Foreign Affairs and was also a member of the War Delegation and the Foreign Policy Council. Enström was commissioned as an officer in 1987, passed the Royal War College (Kungliga Krigshögskolan) common course in 1988, and its higher course in 1993. She currently holds the rank of captain in the Swedish Amphibious Corps. She has been a member of the City Council of Vaxholm since 1994 and was chairman of the council from 2002 to 2006.

== Other activities ==
- European Council on Foreign Relations (ECFR), Member of the Council

== Personal life ==
Enström is the daughter of surgeon general Staffan Landerholm and Olena (born Tingdahl). Her older brother, Henrik Landerholm, served as Sweden's National Security Advisor from 2022 until his resignation in 2025 and was Sweden's Ambassador to Riga from 2013 to 2017 and to the United Arab Emirates from 2017 to 2021. Her sister, Louise Landerholm Bill, is married to Per Bill. Her niece, Alice Landerholm, is chairman of the Moderate School Youth since 2023.

She is married to Anders Enström, a lieutenant colonel in the Amphibious Corps employed at the Navy Tactical Staff Headquarters. She has three children.

Party political offices
Preceded by Gunnar Strömmer	Secretary-General of the Moderate Party; 2022–	Incumbent
Political offices
Preceded by Catharina Elmsäter-Svärd acting	Minister of Defence; 2012–2014	Succeeded by Peter Hultqvist
Preceded by Carina Ohlsson	President by age 2022	Succeeded by Tomas Eneroth
