= Henrik Landerholm =

Swedish politician (born 1963)

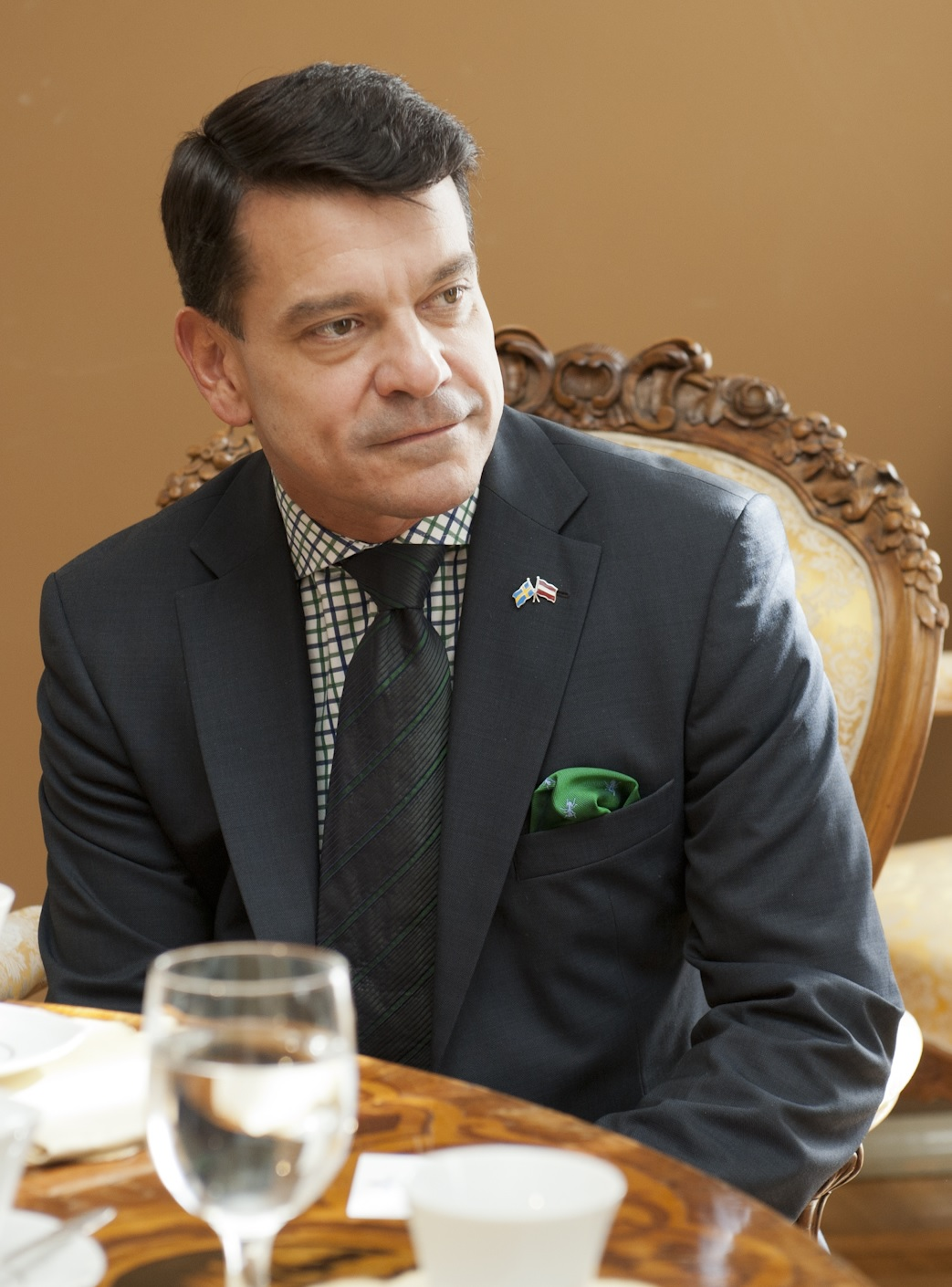
- Landerholm in 2013.

National Security Advisor to the Government of Sweden
- In office 10 November 2022 – 27 January 2025
- Prime Minister: Ulf Kristersson
- Preceded by: Office established
- Succeeded by: Annika Brändström (acting)

Member of the Riksdag
- In office 1991–2002
- Constituency: Södermanland County

Personal details
- Born: 10 August 1963 (age 63) Uppsala, Sweden
- Party: Moderate Party
- Relations: Karin Enström (sister); Per Bill (brother-in-law)
- Children: Alice Landerholm

Military service
- Allegiance: Sweden
- Branch/service: Swedish Army
- Years of service: 1983–1991 (active); 1991–present (reserve)
- Rank: Lieutenant colonel
- Unit: Södermanland Regiment; Swedish Army Reserve

Carl Henrik Jacob Landerholm (born 10 August 1963) is a Swedish politician who served as the first National Security Advisor to the Government of Sweden from 2022 until his resignation in 2025. He is a member of the Moderate Party and has previously served as a Member of the Riksdag. Between 1998 and 2002 he was Chairman of the Defense Committee.

== Background ==
Henrik Landerholm is the only son of Staffan Landerholm and Olena Tingdahl. He has two sisters, former Minister of Defense Karin Enström and Uppsala Municipal politician Louise Landerholm Bill, who is married to the former Governor of Gävleborg County Per Bill. He has three adult children.

Landerholm and Swedish Prime Minister Ulf Kristersson have been friends since their childhood.

== Career ==
Between 1991 and 2002 he served as a Member of the Riksdag. During this time he held a number of roles. For example, he was a Member of the Advisory Council on Foreign Affairs and the War Delegation as well as Chairman of the Defense Committee.

In 2002 he became Vice-Chancellor of the Swedish Defence University, a post he held until 2008. He had previously served in the Swedish Armed Forces and currently holds the rank of Lieutenant Colonel in the army reserve.

During the 2010s Landerholm served in multiple ambassadorial positions, first as Senior Civilian Representative in Mazar-i-Sharif in Afghanistan from 2011 until 2013, then as Sweden's Ambassador to Latvia between 2014 and 2017 and later as its Ambassador to the United Arab Emirates, Bahrain and Kuwait from 2017 until 2021. In 2022 he was made the inaugural Director General of the Psychological Defence Agency.

=== Landerholm affair ===
Landerholm was appointed as the first National Security Advisor to the Government of Sweden by Prime Minister Ulf Kristersson in November 2022 and resigned his post as Director General. In this role he adviced the National Security Council and the Prime Minister in matters of foreign and security policy, as well as matters of national security.

In December 2024 a scandal emerged that Landerholm had accidentally left a state document in a conference center locker. Later it however became public that it was four classified documents that had been left at the conference center. It was reported that the Government Offices considered the situation to be very serious. Landerholm admitted that it was bad that the incident was able to occur. After the scandal several key opposition figures, most prominently former Minister of Defence and chairman of the Defence Committee Peter Hultqvist, called for Landerholm's resignation.

Landerholm tendered his resignation on 27 January 2025 after the Swedish Security Service launched formal investigations into the classified documents case. On 11 March 2025, charges were brought against Landerholm for negligence with classified information. He was then placed on trial in August 2025 in proceedings that were mostly closed to the public due to the nature of the case. On 5 September 2025, Landerholm was acquitted on charges of severe negligence. Even though his behaviour was found negligent by the court, his negligence did not hit the threshold to be convicted. This ruling was appealed and a new trial in the Court of Appeal was held in September 2026. On 19 October 2026, the Court of Appeal convicted Landerholm and sentenced him to pay 80 day fines of 650 SEK, meaning a total of 52,000 SEK.

== Dates of rank ==
- 1986 – Second lieutenant
- 1988 – Lieutenant
- 1994 – Captain
- 2008 – Lieutenant colonel

Diplomatic posts
Preceded by Mats Staffanson	Ambassador of Sweden to Latvia; 2013–2017	Succeeded by Annika Jagander
Preceded by Jan Thesleff	Ambassador of Sweden to the United Arab Emirates; 2017–2021	Succeeded by Liselott Andersson
Preceded by Jan Thesleff	Ambassador of Sweden to Bahrain; 2017–2021	Succeeded by Liselott Andersson
Preceded by Dag Juhlin-Dannfelt	Ambassador of Sweden to Kuwait; 2017–2021	Succeeded by Liselott Andersson
