= Göran Bundy =

Swedish diplomat (1921–2018)

- Born: Göran Fredrik Bundy; 10 June 1921; Malmö, Sweden
- Died: 8 August 2018 (aged 97); Ystad, Sweden
- Resting place: Arlöv Cemetery
- Education: Lund University
- Occupation: Diplomat
- Years active: 1948–1986
- Spouse(s): Margaretha Arfwedson (m. 1955; div. 1958) Margaretha Grind (m. 2006)
- Children: 1

Göran Fredrik Bundy (10 June 1921 – 8 August 2018) was a Swedish diplomat who served in the Ministry for Foreign Affairs for nearly 40 years. After graduating in law from Lund University, he held diplomatic postings in Prague, Paris, Canberra, Cairo, Tehran, Washington, D.C., Helsinki, and Nicosia. He was Sweden’s Ambassador to Kuwait (1977–1980), with accreditation to Qatar, Bahrain, and the UAE, and Ambassador to Iran (1980–1985). During the Iran hostage crisis, he played a key role in assisting British nationals and maintaining contact with detained American diplomats, earning honors from both the British government and the Church of England. After retiring, Bundy co-founded the Eva and Göran Bundy Foundation, which supports medical research in cardiology and neurology at Lund University.

== Early life ==
Bundy was born on 10 June 1921 in Malmö, Sweden, the son of Håkan Bundy and his wife Märta (née Thorell). When he was two-year-old Bundy suffered from polio - infantile paralysis. Then there was still no vaccine. He was lucky, a nerve in one calf was infected, while a two-year girl in his circle of friends, who also had the disease, died. During his teenage years, he spent long periods in England and France, which enabled him to master both languages and sparked an interest in other countries.

He attended secondary school in Helsingborg but graduated in Kristianstad, as his father was in the military and the family was transferred to Kristianstad due to the Second World War. Bundy received a Candidate of Law degree from Lund University in 1946.

== Career ==
Göran Bundy began his diplomatic career at Sweden's Ministry for Foreign Affairs, serving there in 1948 and again from 1953. During the following years, he held postings in Prague (1949), Paris (1950), Canberra (1957), Cairo (1958), and Tehran (1960). In 1960, he was appointed first secretary at the Foreign Ministry, becoming director in 1963. The following year, he served as chargé d'affaires ad interim in Nicosia. His later assignments included commercial counsellor at the Swedish embassy in Washington, D.C. (1965), deputy director at the Foreign Ministry (1971), and embassy counsellor in Helsinki (1972).

From 1977 to 1980, Bundy served as Sweden's ambassador to Kuwait, with concurrent accreditation to Qatar, Bahrain, and the United Arab Emirates. He was then appointed ambassador to Iran, serving in Tehran from 1980 to 1985. Upon arriving in Tehran in April 1980, Bundy became involved in the Iran hostage crisis. Among other efforts, he met with three American diplomats who had been held captive at the Iranian Ministry of Foreign Affairs since November 1979.

On 30 July 1981, Bundy was honored in London by both the British government and the Church of England for his efforts in Iran. As Sweden served as the United Kingdom's protecting power in Iran, Bundy and the Swedish embassy assisted numerous British citizens during 1980–81. Foreign Secretary Lord Carrington presented him with an engraved silver casket in recognition of his outstanding service in protecting British nationals, while the Archbishop of Canterbury awarded him the Cross of St Augustine, the Church's highest distinction, for his support of missionaries.

After completing his ambassadorial post, he returned to the Ministry for Foreign Affairs in Stockholm, where he served from 1985 to 1986.

== Personal life ==
On 26 May 1949, Bundy became engaged to Brita Sjunneson, daughter of the director John Sjunneson and Elsa Ericson.

On 15 January 1955, Bundy became engaged to Sigrid Margaretha Arfwedson (1932–2026), daughter of county assessor Fritz Arfwedson and his wife, née Holmström, of Stockholm. They were married on 7 April 1955 at Gustaf Adolf Church in Stockholm. They had one son: Michael Wang (1956–2019). Arfwedson and Bundy divorced in 1958.

After retiring, Bundy lived in London for 25 years before moving back home to Scania, Sweden. Bundy married late in life, in 2006, to Margaretha Grind, a doctor, a specialist in internal medicine and for many years tied to the pharmaceutical company AstraZeneca. In 2013, together with his sister Eva, Bundy founded the Eva and Göran Bundy's Foundation in support of medical research at Lund University to support research in cardiology and neurology. Together they have donated SEK 60 million ($6,52 million) to the foundation.

== Death ==
Bundy died on 8 August 2018 in Ystad, Sweden. The funeral service took place on 29 August 2018, at Gustaf Adolf Church in Stockholm. He was interred on 20 September 2018 at the Bundy family grave at Arlöv Cemetery in Arlöv.

== Awards and honours ==
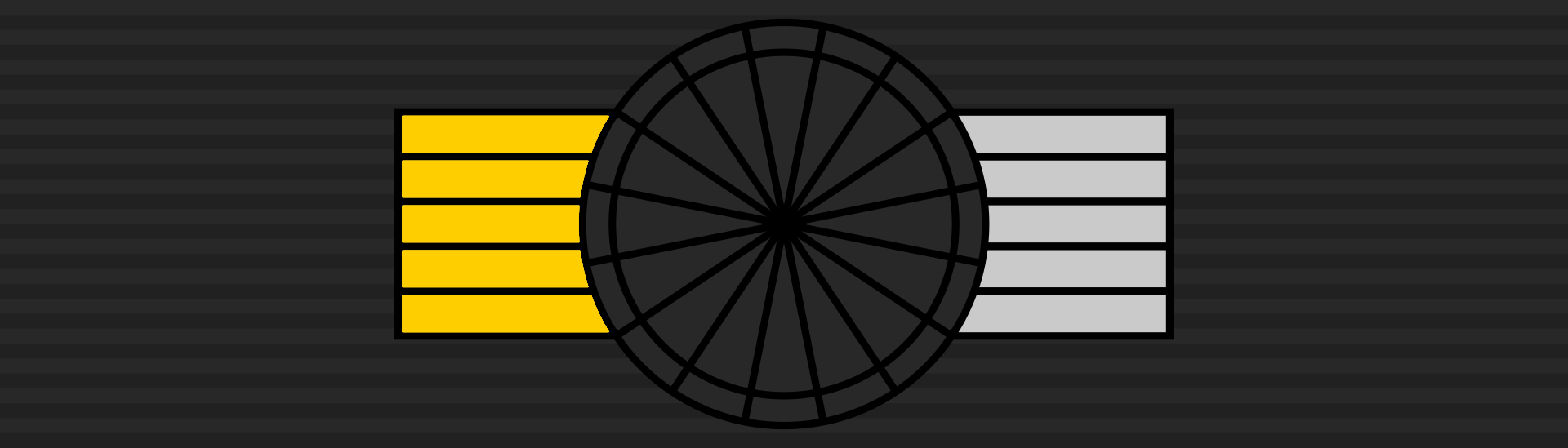
- (Sweden) Commander 1st Class of the Order of the Polar Star (17 November 1969)
- (United Kingdom) Cross of St Augustine (30 July 1981)
- Honorary Doctor of Medicine, Lund University (2017)

Diplomatic posts
Preceded by Bengt Rösiö	Ambassador of Sweden to Kuwait; 1977–1980	Succeeded by Thord Bengtson
Preceded by Bengt Rösiö	Ambassador of Sweden to Qatar; 1977–1980	Succeeded by Thord Bengtson
Preceded by Bengt Rösiö	Ambassador of Sweden to Bahrain; 1977–1980	Succeeded by Thord Bengtson
Preceded by Bengt Rösiö	Ambassador of Sweden to the United Arab Emirates; 1977–1980	Succeeded by Thord Bengtson
Preceded by Kaj Sundberg	Ambassador of Sweden to Iran; 1980–1985	Succeeded by Bo Henrikson
