= Fredrik Bergenstråhle =

Swedish diplomat

- Born: Johan Fredrik Göstasson (Gson) Bergenstråhle; 23 September 1926; Stockholm, Sweden
- Died: 10 February 2005 (aged 78); Apeldoorn, Netherlands
- Education: Stockholm University College
- Occupation: Diplomat
- Years active: 1956–1991
- Spouse: Willy de Weerd (m. 1956)

Johan Fredrik Göstasson (Gson) Bergenstråhle (23 September 1926 – 10 February 2005) was a Swedish diplomat.

== Early life ==
Fredrik was born into the noble Bergenstråhle family in Stockholm, Sweden on 23 September 1926. His father, Colonel Gösta Bergenstråhle (1891–1978), was executive commander of the Life Regiment Hussars (1946–51). His mother, Greta Amelie Maria Löfgren (1899–1983), was the daughter of Court of Appeal clerk John Henrik Löfgren and Hildur Ellen Sigrid Kalling. He had one older and two younger brothers.

Bergenstråhle received a Candidate of Law degree from Stockholm University College in 1950.

== Career ==
Bergenstråhle worked at the Swedish National Bank and the General Export Association of Sweden from 1951 to 1952 before becoming an attaché at the Ministry for Foreign Affairs in 1952. Bergenstråhle served in Bonn from 1954 to 1956 and was embassy secretary in Rio de Janeiro from 1956 to 1961. He was senior administrative officer at the Foreign Ministry from 1961 to 1965, embassy counsellor in Brussels from 1965 to 1971 and embassy counsellor and chargé d'affaires ad interim in Kuala Lumpur from 1971 to 1975. During his time as chargé d'affaires in Kuala Lumpur in 1975, Bergenstråhle was held hostage for over 80 hours by the Japanese Red Army, but was released unharmed.

He was ambassador in Baghdad from 1975 to 1979, consul-general in San Francisco from 1979 and 1980 and ambassador in Jeddah, Muscat and Sanaa from 1980 to 1984. Bergenstråhle was a negotiator at the Foreign Ministry in 1985 and then took leave from the Foreign Ministry to serve at Astra Pharmaceuticals International in England from 1986 to 1988. He was then ambassador in Bogotá from 1989 to 1991.

== Personal life ==
In 1956 he married Wilhelmina (Willy) de Weerd (born 1927), the daughter of director Gerrit Jan de Weerd and Jeanette Aleida (née Kloosterboer). After retirement, the family settled in Stockholm but later moved to Apeldoorn, the Netherlands where he lived at the time of his death.

== See also ==
- 1975 AIA building hostage crisis

Diplomatic posts
Preceded by Otto Rathsman	Ambassador of Sweden to Iraq; 1975–1979	Succeeded by Lars-Olof Brilioth
Preceded by Cecilia Nettelbrandt	Consul-general of Sweden to San Francisco; 1979–1980	Succeeded by Otto Rathsman
Preceded by Carl-Gustaf Bielke	Ambassador of Sweden to Saudi Arabia; 1980–1984	Succeeded by Frank Belfrage
Preceded by Carl-Gustaf Bielke	Ambassador of Sweden to Oman; 1980–1984	Succeeded by Frank Belfrage
Preceded by Carl-Gustaf Bielke	Ambassador of Sweden to North Yemen; 1980–1984	Succeeded by Frank Belfrage
Preceded by Karl Wärnberg	Ambassador of Sweden to Colombia; 1989–1991	Succeeded by Sven Juhlin
Preceded by Karl Wärnberg	Ambassador of Sweden to Panama; 1989–1991	Succeeded by Lars Jonsson
