= List of ambassadors of Sweden to the Maldives =

Ambassador of Sweden to the Maldives
- Lesser coat of arms of the Kingdom of Sweden

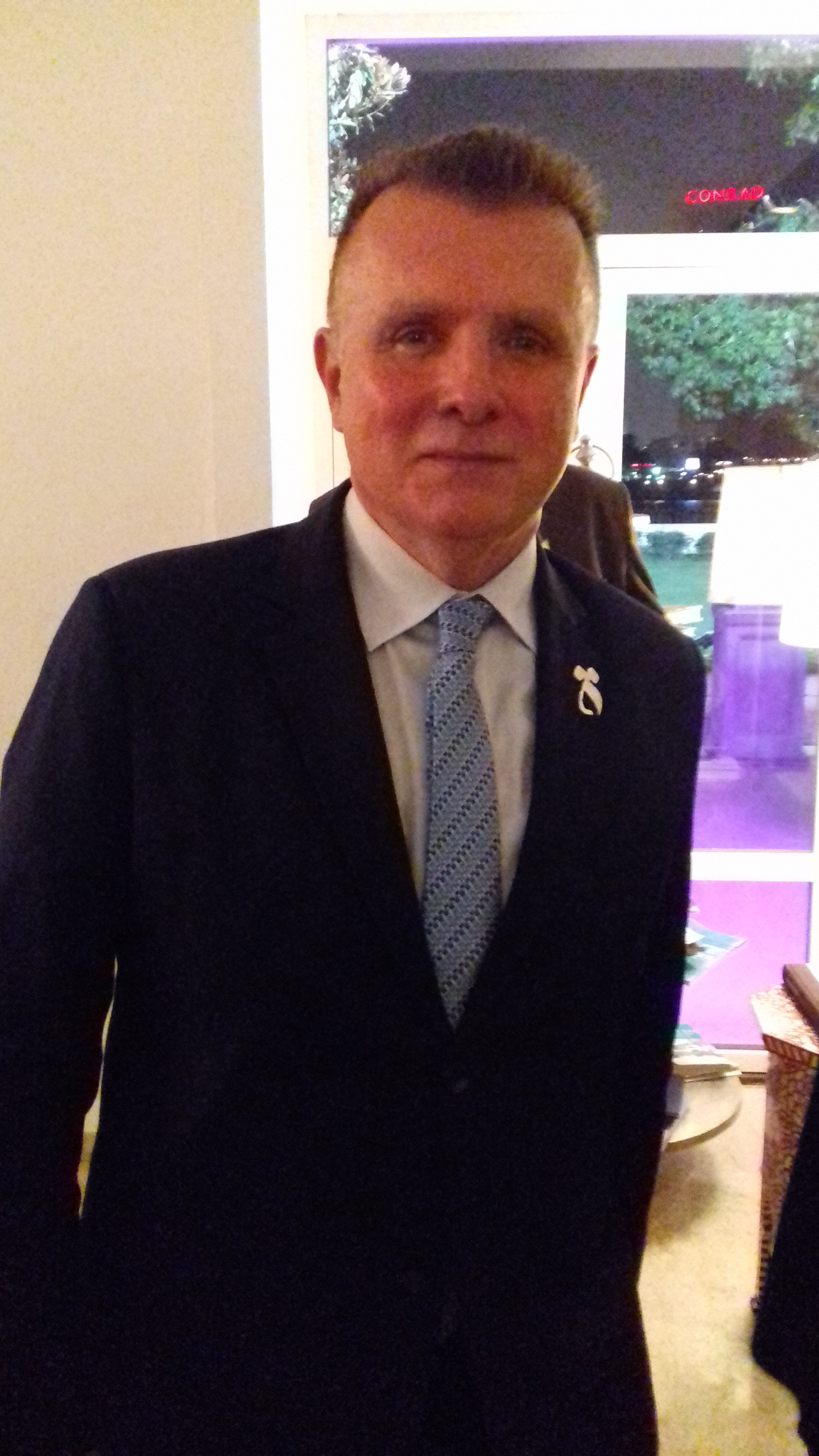
- Incumbent; Jan Thesleff since 2022
- Ministry for Foreign Affairs; Swedish Embassy, New Delhi
- Style: His or Her Excellency (formal); Mr. or Madam Ambassador (informal)
- Reports to: Minister for Foreign Affairs
- Seat: New Delhi, India (Note: The ambassador is resident in New Delhi, India.)
- Appointer: Government of Sweden
- Term length: No fixed term
- Inaugural holder: Bengt Rösiö
- Formation: 21 August 1978

The Ambassador of Sweden to the Maldives (known formally as the Ambassador of the Kingdom of Sweden to the Republic of Maldives) is the official representative of the government of Sweden to the president of the Maldives and government of the Maldives. Sweden's ambassador in New Delhi, India, is concurrently accredited to Malé, the capital of the Maldives.

== History ==
Sweden established diplomatic relations with the Maldives on 21 August 1978, the same day that Bengt Rösiö, Sweden's ambassador in Islamabad, Pakistan, was also appointed ambassador to Malé, the capital of the Maldives.

In 1995, this accreditation was transferred to the Swedish ambassador in New Delhi, India.

== List of representatives ==
Name	Period	Title	Notes	Presented credentials	Ref
Bengt Rösiö	21 August 1978 – 1979	Ambassador	Resident in Islamabad		
Carl-Johan Groth	1979–1983	Ambassador	Resident in Islamabad		
Sten Strömholm	1983–1985	Ambassador	Resident in Islamabad		
Gunnar Hultner	1986–1990	Ambassador	Resident in Islamabad		
Ian Paulsson	1990–1995	Ambassador	Resident in Islamabad		
Karl-Göran Engström	1995–1999	Ambassador	Resident in New Delhi		
Johan Nordenfelt	2000–2004	Ambassador	Resident in New Delhi		
Inga Eriksson Fogh	2004–2006	Ambassador	Resident in New Delhi		
Lars-Olof Lindgren	2007–2012	Ambassador	Resident in New Delhi		
Harald Sandberg	2012–2017	Ambassador	Resident in New Delhi	23 September 2013	
Klas Molin	2017–2022	Ambassador	Resident in New Delhi	28 June 2018	
Jan Thesleff	2022–present	Ambassador	Resident in New Delhi	27 February 2023	
