= Alice Landerholm =

Swedish politician (born 2003)

- Landerholm in 2026

Member of the Riksdag
- Incumbent
- Assumed office 28 September 2026
- Constituency: Södermanland County

Personal details
- Born: 28 May 2003 (age 23)
- Party: Moderate Party
- Parent: Henrik Landerholm (father)
- Relatives: Karin Enström (aunt)

Alice Märta Victoria Landerholm (born 28 May 2003) is a Swedish politician who was elected member of the Riksdag in 2026. From 2023 to 2024, she served as chairwoman of Moderat Skolungdom. She is the daughter of Henrik Landerholm and the niece of Karin Enström.
