= Bergenstråhle =

Swedish and Finnish noble family

- Noble and baronial family
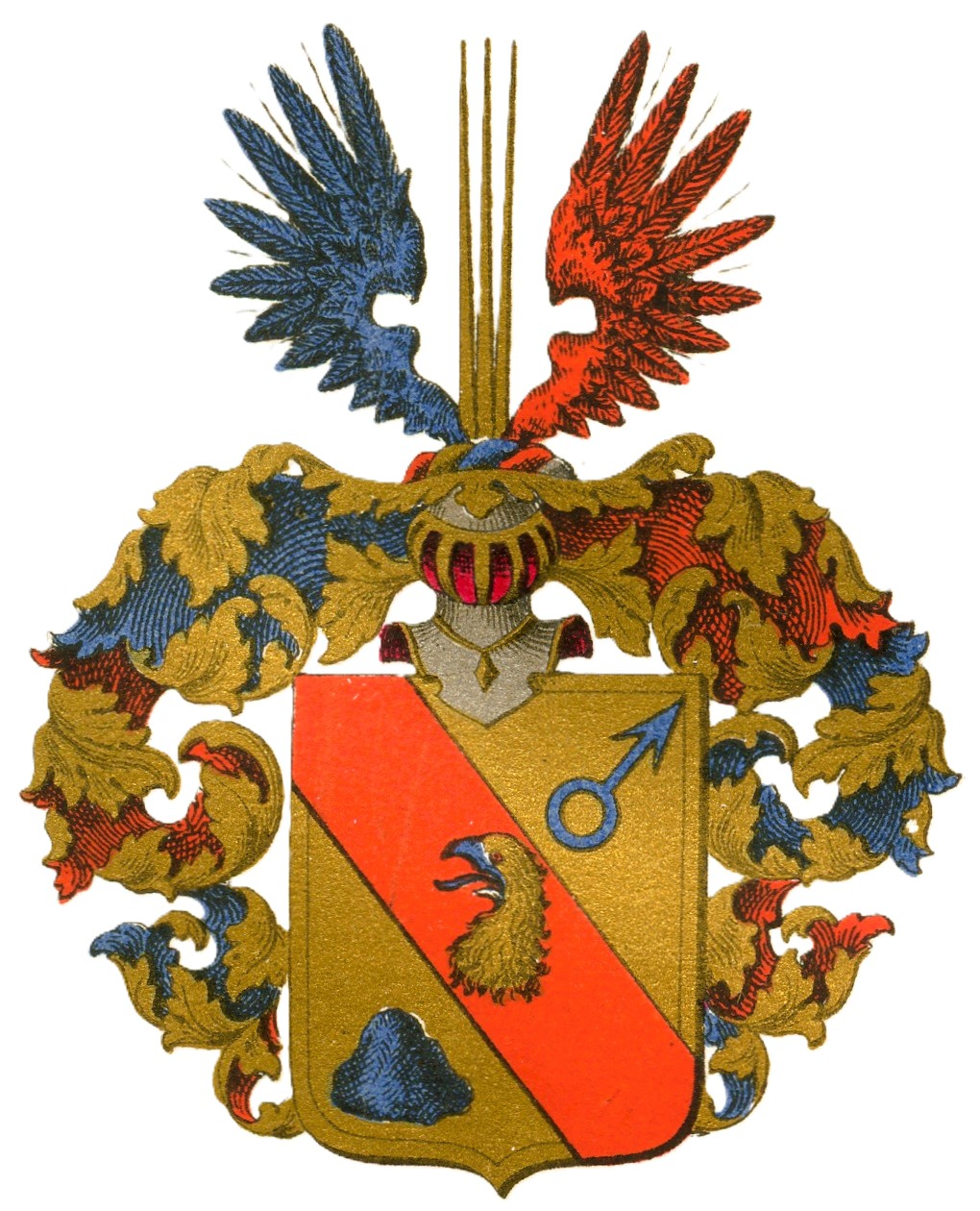
- Escutcheon of the Bergenstråhle family
- Country: Sweden
- Etymology: Bergenstråhle (Swedish): "mountain ray" or "ray of the mountains"
- Origin: Småland
- Founded: 28 November 1719; 306 years ago
- Founder: Gabriel Wetterberg
- Dissolution: 9 June 1829: 1st baronial line 31 January 1864: 2nd baronial line
- Cadet branches: Wetterberg; Rudman

Bergenstråhle is a Swedish noble and baronial family descended from the ironworks owner Gabriel Wetterberg (1665–1729) and his stepsons Jonas and Lorentz Rudman, who were ennobled in 1719. The family split into the Wetterberg and Rudman branches, producing notable military leaders including Major Generals Gustaf and Johan Bergenstråhle and General Adjutant Claes Gabriel Bergenstråhle, two of whom were elevated to baronial rank in the 19th century. The first baronial line became extinct in 1829, the second in 1864, and the Rudman branch also died out in Finland in 1916. The noble family Ehrenstedt descends from the same lineage.

== History ==
The noble (adlig) and baronial (friherrlig) Bergenstråhle family traces its origins to the ironworks owner Gabriel Wetterberg (1665–1729) and his stepsons, later assessor of the Court of Appeal Jonas Rudman (1689–1761) and Captain Lorentz Rudman (1694–1760), who were ennobled on 28 November 1719 under the same name and number (No. 1696) and introduced at the Swedish House of Nobility in 1720.

A son of the aforementioned Jonas Bergenstråhle, Court of Appeal Councillor Rudman Bergenstråhle (1724–1813), became the father of Major General Johan Bergenstråhle, Major General Gustaf Bergenstråhle (1771–1829), and General Adjutant and Governor Claes Gabriel Bergenstråhle. Of these, the latter two were elevated to baronial rank: Gustaf on 5 November 1821 (No. 375, introduced 1822) and Claes Gabriel on 29 December 1855 (No. 400, introduced 1856). The first baronial line became extinct on 9 June 1829, while the second line ended on 31 January 1864.

The family is divided into two branches: the Wetterberg branch and the Rudman branch. Three members of the Rudman branch were registered at the Finnish House of Nobility on 5 February 1818 under No. 109 among the nobility, though the family became extinct in Finland in 1916. From the same lineage as the Rudman branch also descends the noble family Ehrenstedt (No. 1192).

== People with the surname Bergenstråhle ==
- Carl Bergenstråhle (1909–1977), diplomat
- Claes Gabriel Bergenstråhle (1787–1864), colonel
- Edvard Bergenstråhle (1864–1954), chamberlain
- Eric Bergenstråhle (1889–1942), banker
- Fredrik Bergenstråhle (1926–2005), diplomat
- Gabriel Bergenstråhle(1665–1729), factory owner
- Georg Bergenstråhle (1872–1943), colonel
- Gillis Bergenstråhle (1855–1919), colonel
- Gustaf Bergenstråhle (1771–1829), general
- Gösta Bergenstråhle, disambiguation page
  - Gösta Bergenstråhle (1841–1910), general
  - Gösta Bergenstråhle (1891–1978), colonel
- Joachim Bergenstråhle (born 1958), screenwriter, director and lecturer
- Johan Bergenstråhle, disambiguation page
  - Johan Bergenstråhle (1756–1840), general
  - Johan Bergenstråhle (1935–1995), director
- Johanna Bergenstråhle (född 1972), filmproducent
- Jonas Rudman Bergenstråhle (1689–1761), district court judge
- Marie-Louise De Geer Bergenstråhle (born 1944), artist, filmmaker and theater director, see Marie-Louise Ekman
- Rudman Bergenstråhle (1724–1813), judge
- Wilhelm Bergenstråhle, disambiguation page
  - Wilhelm Bergenstråhle (1856–1913), colonel
  - Wilhelm Bergenstråhle (1871–1949), director
