= List of ambassadors of Sweden to Libya =

Ambassador of Sweden to Libya
- Lesser coat of arms of the Kingdom of Sweden
- Incumbent; Cecilia Wramsten since 2023
- Ministry for Foreign Affairs; Swedish Embassy, Tripoli
- Style: His or Her Excellency (formal); Mr. or Madam Ambassador (informal)
- Reports to: Minister for Foreign Affairs
- Seat: Tunis, Tunisia (Note: Sweden's ambassador in Tunis, Tunisia is co-accredited in Tripoli.)
- Appointer: Government of Sweden
- Term length: No fixed term
- Inaugural holder: Lennart Petri
- Formation: August 1960

The Ambassador of Sweden to Libya (known formally as the Ambassador of the Kingdom of Sweden to the State of Libya) is the official representative of the government of Sweden to the chairman of the Presidential Council and government of Libya. Since Sweden does not have an embassy in Tripoli, Sweden's ambassador in Tunis, Tunisia is co-accredited in Tripoli.

== History ==
In August 1960, Sweden and the United Kingdom of Libya concluded an agreement establishing diplomatic relations between the two states. Following this decision, Sweden's ambassaror in Rabat, Lennart Petri, was concurrently accredited as ambassador to Tripoli. In November of the same year, Ambassador Petri presented his credentials to King Idris in Tripoli.

Until 1974, Swedish representation in Libya was maintained through an embassy office in Tripoli headed by a consul. In June 1974, Torsten Hylander was appointed as Sweden's first resident ambassador to Libya.

In February 1995, the Swedish government resolved to close the embassy in Tripoli effective mid-year. Since that time, Sweden's ambassador to Libya has been non-resident, based in Stockholm (1995–1999, 2003–2016), Cairo (1999–2003), and Tunis (2016–present), with concurrent accreditation to Libya.

== List of representatives ==
Name	Period	Resident/Non resident	Title	Notes	Presented credentials	Ref
United Kingdom of Libya (1951–1963) and Kingdom of Libya (1963–1969)
Lennart Petri	1960–1962	Non-resident	Ambassador	Resident in Rabat	November 1960	
Per Bertil Kollberg	1963–1967	Non-resident	Ambassador	Resident in Tunis		
Lars Hedström	1967–1969	Non-resident	Ambassador	Resident in Tunis		
Libyan Arab Republic (1969–1977)
Lars Hedström	1969–1972	Non-resident	Ambassador	Resident in Tunis		
Marc Giron	1973–1974	Non-resident	Ambassador	Resident in Tunis		
Torsten Hylander	1974–1977	Resident	Ambassador			
Socialist People's Libyan Arab Jamahiriya (1977–1986) and Great Socialist People's Libyan Arab Jamahiriya (1986–2011)
Torsten Hylander	1977–1978	Resident	Ambassador			
Bengt Holmquist	1977–1983	Resident	Ambassador			
Sven E. Jonsson	1983 – 24 October 1984	Resident	Ambassador	Died in office		
Ian Paulsson	1985–1989	Resident	Ambassador			
Andreas Ådahl	1989–1992	Resident	Ambassador			
Nils-Erik Schyberg	1992–1995	Resident	Ambassador			
Nils-Erik Schyberg	1995–1999	Non-resident	Ambassador	Resident in Stockholm		
Bengt Sparre	1999–2003	Non-resident	Ambassador	Resident in Cairo		
Bo Wilén	2003–2008	Non-resident	Ambassador	Resident in Stockholm		
Anne Marie Dierauer	2009–2011	Non-resident	Ambassador	Resident in Stockholm		
Libya (2011–2017) and State of Libya (2017–present)
Jan Thesleff	2011–2014	Non-resident	Ambassador	Resident in Stockholm		
Fredrik Florén	2014–2016	Non-resident	Ambassador	Resident in Stockholm		
Fredrik Florén	2016–2019	Non-resident	Ambassador	Resident in Tunis	17 July 2017	
Anna Block Mazoyer	2019–2023	Non-resident	Ambassador	Resident in Tunis	10 October 2020	
Cecilia Wramsten	2023–present	Non-resident	Ambassador	Resident in Tunis	26 June 2024	
