= Dag Hartelius =

Swedish diplomat and politician

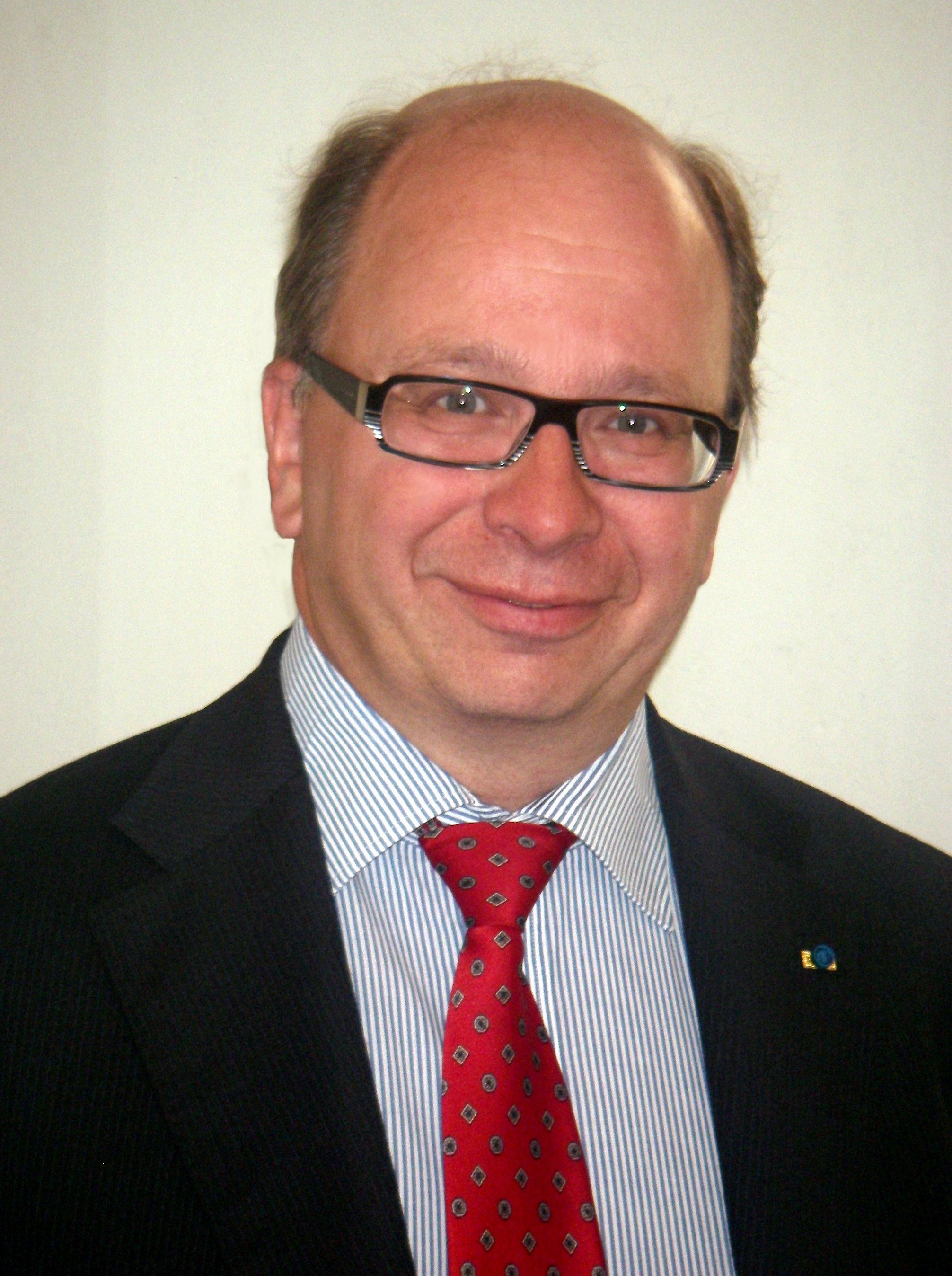
Dag Hartelius, Swedish diplomat

Dag Hartelius (born 8 November 1955 in Härnösand) is a Swedish diplomat and politician for the Moderate Party (M).

Hartelius was Director-General of The National Defence Radio Establishment, assuming office 1 November 2013, and leaving office June 2019. In September 2019, he became the Swedish Ambassador to Hungary.

He has previously been ambassador to Poland (2008–2010), Estonia (2003–2008), stationed in Saint Petersburg, Moscow, Berlin and London, Vice President and Director for the programme for European security at the EastWest Institute in New York, and a Permanent Representative of Sweden to the European Union.

On 10 September 2024, the government announced that Hartelius had been appointed the new State Secretary for Foreign Affairs following a government reshuffle.

Diplomatic posts
Preceded by Elisabet Borsiin Bonnier	Ambassador of Sweden to Estonia; 2003–2008	Succeeded by Jan Palmstierna
Preceded by Tomas Bertelman	Ambassador of Sweden to Poland; 2008–2010	Succeeded by Staffan Herrström
Preceded by Christian Danielsson	Permanent Representative of Sweden to the European Union; 2011–2013	Succeeded by Anders Ahnlid
Preceded by Niclas Trouvé	Ambassador of Sweden to Hungary; 2019–2023	Succeeded by Diana Madunic
Preceded by Mikaela Kumlin Granit	Ambassador of Sweden to Slovenia; 2020–2023	Succeeded by Diana Madunic
Government offices
Preceded by Ingvar Åkesson	Director-General of the National Defence Radio Establishment; 2013–2019	Succeeded by Björn Lyrvall
Preceded by Jan Knutsson	State Secretary for Foreign Affairs; 2024–present	Succeeded by Incumbent
