= List of ambassadors of Sweden to Qatar =

Ambassador of Sweden to Qatar
- Lesser coat of arms of the Kingdom of Sweden

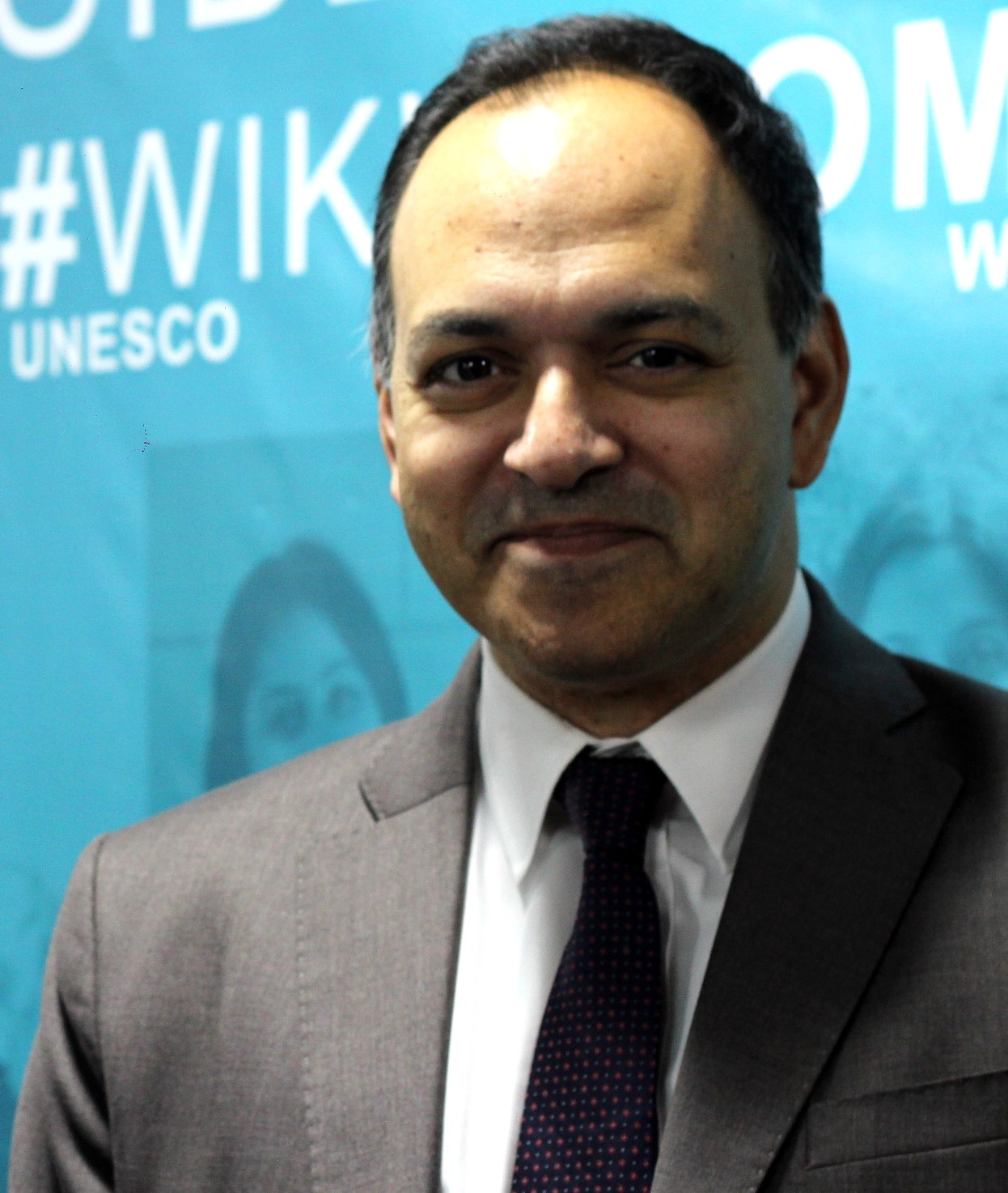
- Incumbent; Gautam Bhattacharyya since September 2022
- Ministry for Foreign Affairs; Swedish Embassy, Doha
- Style: His or Her Excellency (formal); Mr. or Madam Ambassador (informal)
- Reports to: Minister for Foreign Affairs
- Seat: Doha, Qatar
- Appointer: Government of Sweden
- Term length: No fixed term
- Inaugural holder: Bengt Rösiö
- Formation: 1974
- Website: Swedish Embassy, Doha

The Ambassador of Sweden to Qatar (known formally as the Ambassador of the Kingdom of Sweden to the State of Qatar) is the official representative of the government of Sweden to the Emir of Qatar and government of Qatar.

== History ==
Diplomatic relations between Sweden and Qatar were established in 1974. Ambassador Bengt Rösiö, based in Jeddah, Saudi Arabia, was concurrently accredited to Qatar. From 1977 onward, the Swedish ambassador in Kuwait City held concurrent accreditation to Qatar. Following the closure of the Swedish embassy in Kuwait in 2001, the Swedish ambassador in Abu Dhabi, United Arab Emirates, assumed concurrent accreditation to Qatar.

On 19 June 2013, the Swedish government decided to open an embassy in Doha. On 11 May 2014, Ewa Polano presented her credentials to Foreign Minister Khalid bin Mohammad Al Attiyah, becoming Sweden's first resident ambassador in Doha. The embassy was officially inaugurated on 14 May 2014, by the Minister for Foreign Trade, Ewa Björling, and opened on the same day.

== List of representatives ==
| Name | Period | Title | Notes | Ref |
|---|---|---|---|---|
| Bengt Rösiö | 1974–1977 | Ambassador | Resident in Jeddah. | |
| Göran Bundy | 1977–1980 | Ambassador | Resident in Kuwait City. | |
| Thord Bengtson | 1980–1982 | Ambassador | Resident in Kuwait City. | |
| Carl-Gustav Åkesson | 1983–1986 | Ambassador | Resident in Kuwait City. | |
| Ulf Norström | 1986–1989 | Ambassador | Resident in Kuwait City. | |
| Ingolf Kiesow | 1989–1991 (Note: Ingolf Kiesow was stationed in Kuwait City and also accredited to Doha. After the Iraqi invasion of Kuwait on 2 August 1990, Kiesow stayed in Kuwait City until he was forced to leave on 8 September, at which point he was stripped of his diplomatic immunity.) | Ambassador | Resident in Kuwait City. | |
| Tommy Arwitz | 1992–1997 | Ambassador | Resident in Kuwait City. | |
| Thomas Ganslandt | 1997–2001 | Ambassador | Resident in Kuwait City. | |
| Lars-Erik Grundell | 2001–2005 | Ambassador | Resident in Abu Dhabi. | |
| Bruno Beijer | 2005–2010 | Ambassador | Resident in Abu Dhabi. | |
| Max Bjuhr | 2011–2014 | Ambassador | Resident in Abu Dhabi. | |
| Ewa Polano | 2014–2019 | Ambassador | | |
| Anders Bengtcén | 1 September 2019 – 2022 | Ambassador | | |
| Gautam Bhattacharyya | September 2022 – present | Ambassador | | |

== See also ==
- Qatar–Sweden relations
