= Jan Thesleff =

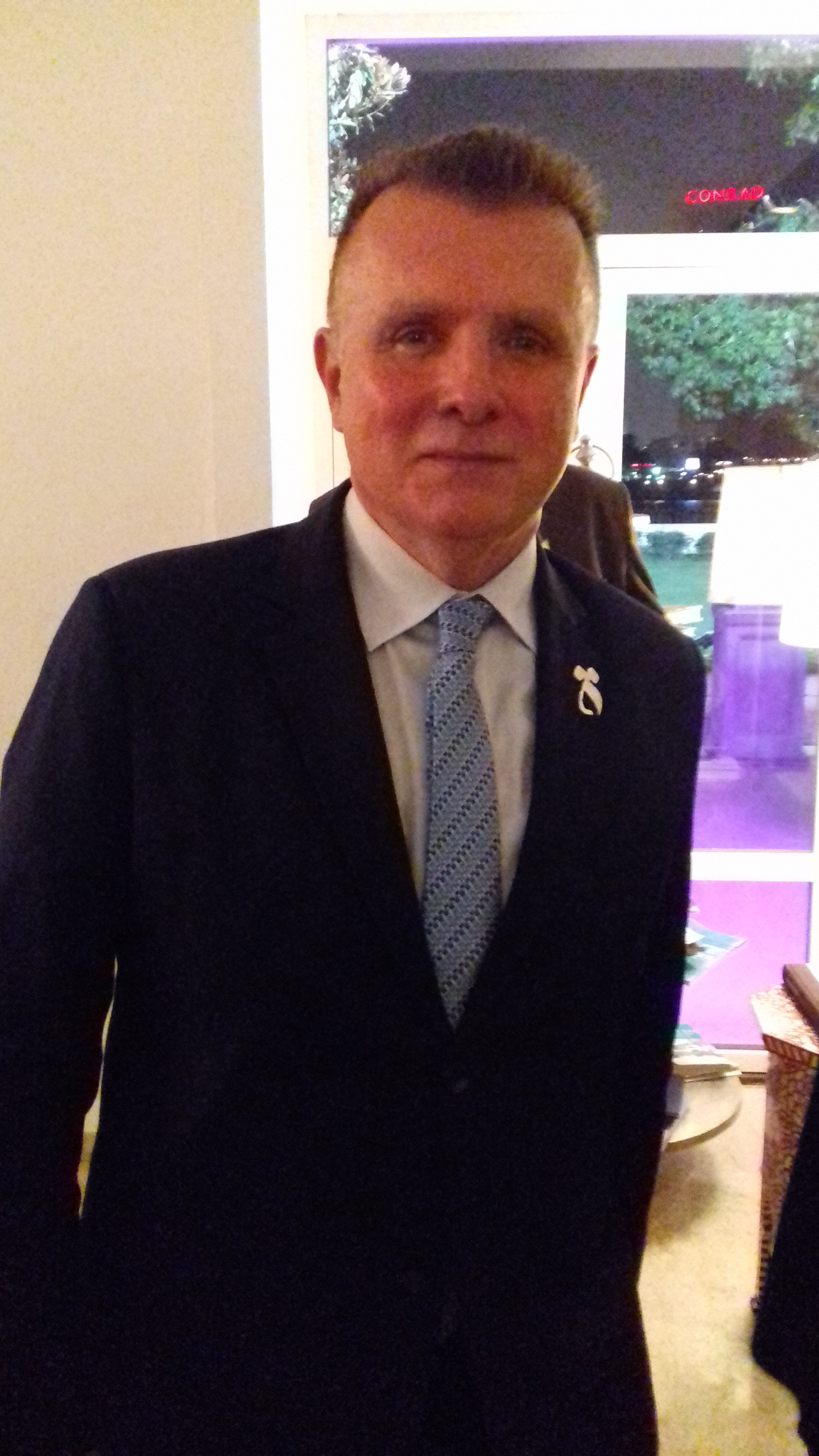
- Born: 6 January 1959 (age 67); Lund, Sweden
- Education: Lund University; University of Montpellier; Tunis University
- Occupation: Diplomat
- Years active: 1986–present
- Spouse: Anna Wettermark (m. 1993)

Jan Thesleff (born 6 January 1959) is a Swedish diplomat. He has served as Swedish ambassador in a number of different countries since 2006.

== Early life ==
Thesleff was born on 6 January 1959 in Lund, Sweden. Between 1979 and 1985 he was educating at university in Lund, Montpellier and Tunis.

== Career ==
For next two years he was project manager and controller of Alfa Laval in Lund then he started The Ministry of Foreign Affairs' diplomatic program. In years 1998–1991 he was Second Embassy Secretary at the Embassy in Damascus before he became Second Embassy Secretary at the Embassy in Tokyo. He became member of Embassy Council at the Embassy in Cairo. In 1999 he became member of Embassy Council at the Swedish European Union representation in Brussels with responsibility for the Middle East and North Africa issues. Next he became Political Advisor to European Union Special Envoy for Peace Middle East process. Between 2006 and 2011 he was an Ambassador to Saudi Arabia, Kuwait, Oman and Yemen then in 2011 he became an ambassador to Tunisia and Libya. In 2014 became ambassador to United Arab Emirates and in 2017 he became Ambassador to Egypt. In October 2020 Ambassador Jan Thesleff was appointed to Commissioner General – to lead the work in the Committee for Sweden´s Participation at Expo 2020 in Dubai. He took up his duties as Commissioner General in January 2021.

== Personal life ==
He got married in 1993.

Diplomatic posts
Preceded by Åke Karlsson	Ambassador of Sweden to Saudi Arabia; 2006–2011	Succeeded by Dag Juhlin-Dannfelt
Preceded by Åke Karlsson	Ambassador of Sweden to Kuwait; 2006–2011	Succeeded by Dag Juhlin-Dannfelt
Preceded by Åke Karlsson	Ambassador of Sweden to Oman; 2006–2011	Succeeded by Dag Juhlin-Dannfelt
Preceded by Åke Karlsson	Ambassador of Sweden to Yemen; 2006–2011	Succeeded by Dag Juhlin-Dannfelt
Preceded by Anne Marie Dierauer	Ambassador of Sweden to Tunisia; 2011–2014	Succeeded by Fredrik Florén
Preceded by Anne Marie Dierauer	Ambassador of Sweden to Libya; 2011–2014	Succeeded by Fredrik Florén
Preceded by Max Bjuhr	Ambassador of Sweden to the United Arab Emirates; 2014–2017	Succeeded by Henrik Landerholm
Preceded by Max Bjuhr	Ambassador of Sweden to Bahrain; 2014–2017	Succeeded by Henrik Landerholm
Preceded by Charlotta Sparre	Ambassador of Sweden to Egypt; 2017–2021	Succeeded by Håkan Emsgård
Preceded by Klas Molin	Ambassador of Sweden to India; 2022–2026	Succeeded by Petra Menander
Preceded by Klas Molin	Ambassador of Sweden to Bhutan; 2022–2026	Succeeded by Petra Menander
Preceded by Klas Molin	Ambassador of Sweden to Nepal; 2022–2026	Succeeded by Petra Menander
Preceded by Klas Molin	Ambassador of Sweden to the Maldives; 2022–2026	Succeeded by Petra Menander
Preceded by Klas Molin	Ambassador of Sweden to Sri Lanka; 2022–2026	Succeeded by Petra Menander
