= Fredrik Florén =

Swedish diplomat

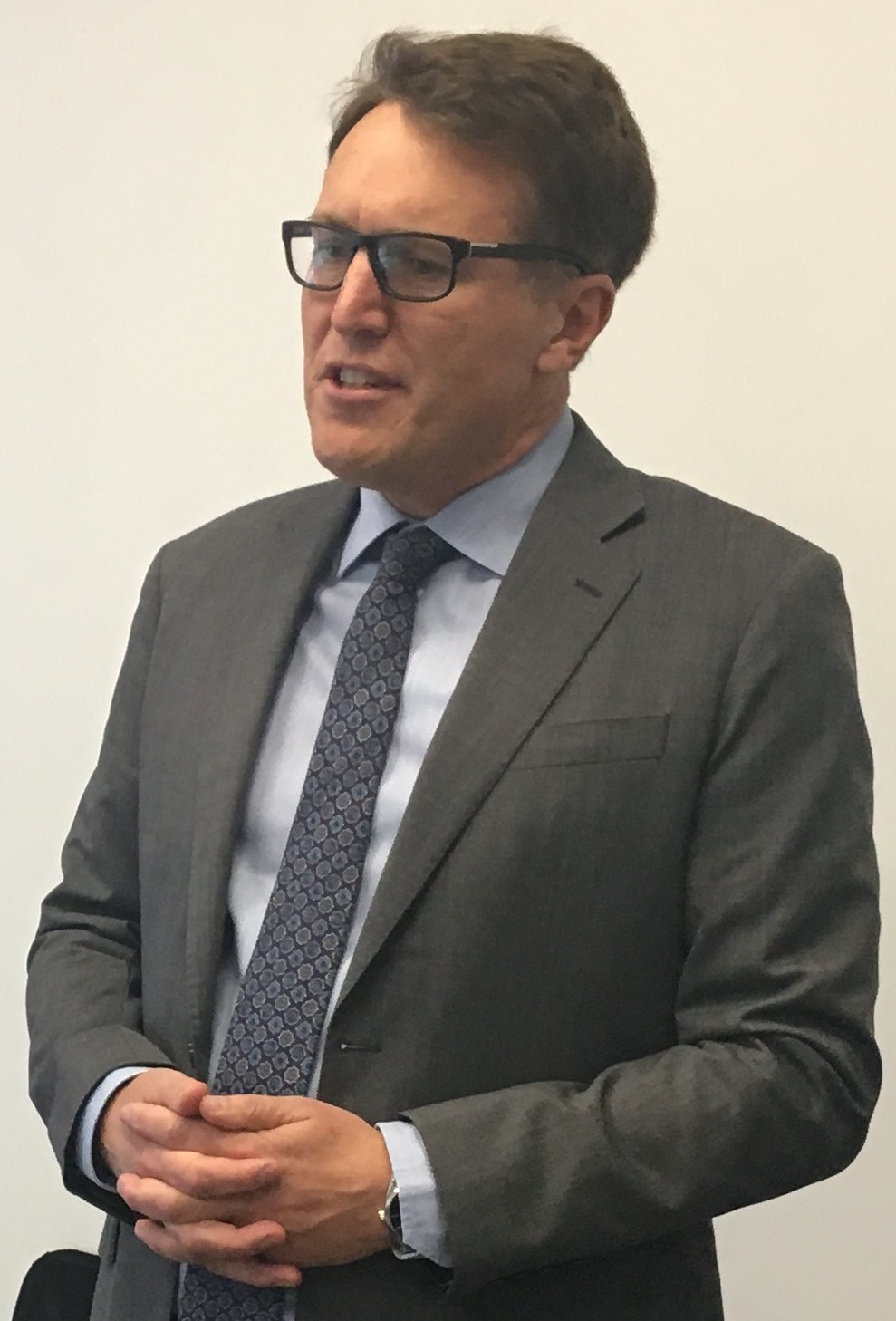
- Florén in 2018.

Ambassador of Sweden to the United Arab Emirates, Bahrain, and Kuwait
- Incumbent
- Assumed office September 2023
- Prime Minister: Ulf Kristersson
- Preceded by: Liselott Andersson

Ambassador of Sweden to Tunisia and Libya
- In office 2014–2019
- Preceded by: Jan Thesleff
- Succeeded by: Anna Block Mazoyer

Personal details
- Born: Per Fredrik Florén; 22 July 1971 (age 55)
- Education: University of Lund, University of Salamanca

Per Fredrik Florén (born 22 July 1971) is a Swedish diplomat currently serving as the ambassador to the United Arab Emirates, concurrently accredited to Bahrain and Kuwait. He previously served as ambassador to Tunisia and Libya, worked in the Swedish embassy in Havana, Cuba, and in the delegation to OSCE.

Diplomatic posts
Preceded by Jan Thesleff	Ambassador of Sweden to Tunisia; 2014–2019	Succeeded by Anna Block Mazoyer
Preceded by Jan Thesleff	Ambassador of Sweden to Libya; 2014–2019	Succeeded by Anna Block Mazoyer
Preceded by Liselott Andersson	Ambassador of Sweden to the United Arab Emirates; 2023–present	Succeeded by Incumbent
Preceded by Liselott Andersson	Ambassador of Sweden to Bahrain; 2023–present	Succeeded by Incumbent
Preceded by Liselott Andersson	Ambassador of Sweden to Kuwait; 2023–present	Succeeded by Incumbent
