= List of ambassadors of Sweden to Tunisia =

Ambassador of Sweden to Tunisia
- Lesser coat of arms of the Kingdom of Sweden
- Incumbent; Cecilia Wramsten since August 2023
- Ministry for Foreign Affairs; Swedish Embassy, Tunis
- Style: His or Her Excellency (formal); Mr. or Madam Ambassador (informal)
- Reports to: Minister for Foreign Affairs
- Seat: Tunis, Tunisia
- Appointer: Government of Sweden
- Term length: No fixed term
- Formation: 1958
- First holder: Lennart Petri
- Website: Swedish Embassy, Tunis

The Ambassador of Sweden to Tunisia (known formally as the Ambassador of the Kingdom of Sweden to the Republic of Tunisia) is the official representative of the government of Sweden to the president of Tunisia and government of Tunisia.

== History ==
In June 1956, Sweden officially recognized Tunisia as an independent state. The Swedish consulate in Tunis had established relations with the Tunisian authorities, signifying Sweden's recognition of Tunisia. Sweden and Tunisia established diplomatic relations that same year.

Sweden's first envoy to Tunisia was Lennart Petri, who also served as Sweden's envoy in Rabat, Morocco, with dual accreditation in Tunis. On 14 October 1958, Petri presented his credentials to President Habib Bourguiba at Abdellia Palace in La Marsa, Tunis.

In July 1959, an agreement was reached between the Swedish and Tunisian governments to elevate their respective legations to embassies. As a result, the diplomatic rank was changed from envoy extraordinary and minister plenipotentiary to ambassador. In connection with this, Sweden's envoy in Rabat, Lennart Petri, was appointed ambassador in Tunis.

In December 2000, it was decided that the embassy in Tunis would be closed in 2001. From 2002, Sweden's ambassador to Tunisia was stationed in Stockholm. On 5 November 2015, the Swedish government announced that the embassy in Tunis would be reopened, and from 2016, Sweden's ambassador to Tunisia was once again stationed in Tunis.

== List of representatives ==
Name	Period	Resident/Non resident	Title	Accreditation	Ref
Lennart Petri	1958 – July 1959	Non-resident	Envoy	Resident in Rabat.	
Lennart Petri	July 1959 – 1962	Non-resident	Ambassador	Resident in Rabat.	
Per Bertil Kollberg	1963–1967	Resident	Ambassador	Also accredited to Tripoli.	
Lars Hedström	1967–1972	Resident	Ambassador	Also accredited to Tripoli.	
Marc Giron	1972–1976	Resident	Ambassador	Also accredited to Tripoli (1973–1974).	
Olov Ternström	1976–1978	Resident	Ambassador		
Carl-Henric Nauckhoff	1978–1982	Resident	Ambassador		
Bengt Odhner	1983–1984	Resident	Ambassador		
Anders Sandström	1984–1988	Resident	Ambassador		
Magnus Faxén	1988–1992	Resident	Ambassador		
John Hagard	1992–1996	Resident	Ambassador		
Catherine von Heidenstam	1996–1998	Resident	Ambassador		
Staffan Åberg	1998–2001	Resident	Ambassador		
Krister Isaksson	2002–2003	Non-resident	Ambassador	Resident in Stockholm.	
Bo Wilén	2003–2008	Non-resident	Ambassador	Resident in Stockholm.	
Anne Marie Dierauer	2009–2011	Non-resident	Ambassador	Resident in Stockholm.	
Jan Thesleff	2011–2014	Non-resident	Ambassador	Resident in Stockholm.	
Fredrik Florén	2014–2016	Non-resident	Ambassador	Resident in Stockholm.	
Fredrik Florén	2016–2019	Resident	Ambassador	Also accredited to Tripoli.	
Anna Block Mazoyer	1 September 2019 – 2023	Resident	Ambassador	Also accredited to Tripoli.	
Cecilia Wramsten	August 2023 – present	Resident	Ambassador	Also accredited to Tripoli.	

== See also ==
- Sweden–Tunisia relations
