= Gunnar Gerring =

Swedish diplomat

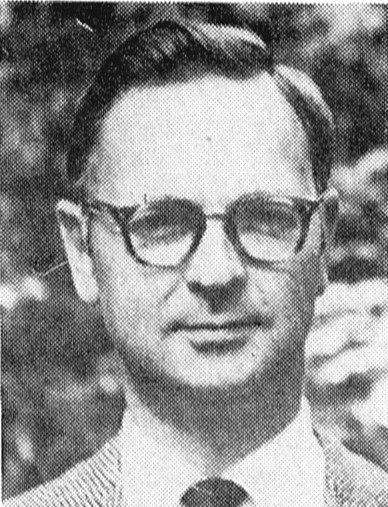
- Born: 25 October 1916; Stockholm, Sweden
- Died: 16 April 2009 (aged 92); Nacka, Sweden
- Education: Uppsala University
- Occupation: Diplomat
- Years active: 1940–1982
- Spouse: Ingrid Wikander (m. 1951)
- Children: 2

Gunnar Gerring (25 October 1916 – 16 April 2009) was a Swedish diplomat. Gerring had a long diplomatic career, beginning with postings in Hamburg, Moscow, and Budapest before becoming a second secretary at the Ministry for Foreign Affairs in 1947. He held key roles in trade negotiations and UN delegations before serving in embassies across Washington, D.C., Ankara, Bern, and Bonn. He was later appointed ambassador to Sofia, Baghdad, Kuwait City, and Wellington, also overseeing relations with Fiji, Tonga, and Western Samoa. His career also included a leadership role in the Neutral Nations Supervisory Commission in Korea and teaching at the Swedish National Defence College.

== Early life ==
Gerring was born on 25 October 1916 in Stockholm, Sweden, the son of lector, PhD Hugo Gerring and his wife Hillan (née Åström). He passed the studentexamen in 1934 and the reserve officers' exam in 1939 (serving as a lieutenant in the cavalry reserve from 1942 to 1953). In 1939, he earned a Candidate of Law degree from Uppsala University. Gerring completed his clerkship at Stockholm City Court from 1940 to 1942 before becoming an attaché at the Ministry for Foreign Affairs in 1942.

== Career ==
Gerring served in Hamburg in 1942, Moscow in 1943, and Budapest in 1946 before becoming a second secretary at the Ministry for Foreign Affairs in 1947. He was a member of the Swedish-Hungarian government commission in 1948 and acted as a representative in trade negotiations with Bulgaria (1947 and 1949), Hungary (1947), and Yugoslavia (1948 and 1949). He also served as secretary for the UN delegation in Paris in 1948 and in New York City in 1950.

He was posted as an embassy secretary in Washington, D.C. in 1949 and Ankara in 1951, promoted to first secretary at the Ministry for Foreign Affairs in 1952, and served as first embassy secretary in Bern in 1957. He returned to the ministry as first secretary in 1959 and served as assistant teacher at the Swedish National Defence College from 1961 to 1962. Gerring became counselor at the embassy in Bonn in 1962, and was appointed ambassador to Sofia (1964–1969) and later to Baghdad and Kuwait City (1969–1973). In 1974, he attended the Swedish National Defence College before serving as head of the Swedish delegation to the Neutral Nations Supervisory Commission in Korea from 10 April 1974 to 30 April 1975. He then returned to the Ministry for Foreign Affairs in 1975 and was appointed ambassador to Wellington (also accredited to Fiji, Tonga, and Western Samoa) from 1979 to 1982.

== Personal life ==
In 1951 he married Ingrid Wikander (1919–2010). He was the father of Erik Gunnar (born 1952) and Carl Gustaf (born 1954).

== Death ==
Gerring died on 16 April 2009 in Nacka Parish in Stockholm. He was buried at Nacka Northern Cemetery.

== Awards and decorations ==
- Knight of the Order of the White Rose of Finland
- (Czechoslovakia) Knight of the Order of the White Lion

Diplomatic posts
Preceded by Rolf Sohlman	Ambassador of Sweden to Bulgaria; 1964–1969	Succeeded by Olof Ripa
Preceded by Bengt Odhner	Ambassador of Sweden to Iraq; 1969–1973	Succeeded by Otto Rathsman
Preceded by Bengt Odhner	Ambassador of Sweden to Kuwait; 1969–1973	Succeeded by Bengt Rösiö
Preceded by Gunnar Ljungdahl	Heads of Swedish Delegation to the NNSC; 10 April 1974 – 30 April 1975	Succeeded by Allan Månsson
Preceded by Sten Aminoff	Ambassador of Sweden to New Zealand; 1979–1982	Succeeded by Christer Sylvén
Preceded by None	Ambassador of Sweden to Fiji; 1979–1982	Succeeded by Christer Sylvén
Preceded by None	Ambassador of Sweden to Tonga; 1979–1982	Succeeded by Christer Sylvén
Preceded by None	Ambassador of Sweden to Samoa; 1979–1982	Succeeded by Christer Sylvén
