= Bengt Rösiö =

Swedish diplomat and author (1927–2019)

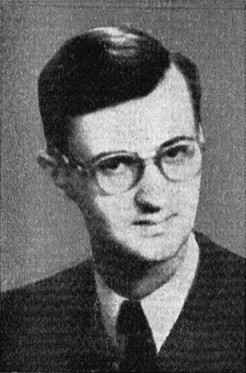
- Born: Per Bengt Magnus Ingemar Rösiö; 14 May 1927; Åmål, Sweden
- Died: 19 May 2019 (aged 92)
- Education: Uppsala University
- Occupation: Diplomat
- Years active: 1951–1992
- Spouse(s): Joan Binns (m. 1955) Görel Pernvik (m. 1969)
- Children: 2

Per Bengt Magnus Ingemar Rösiö (14 May 1927 – 19 May 2019) was a Swedish diplomat and author. He served as Ambassador to 17 countries and authored 20 books, mainly on diplomacy. He is more widely known however for having conducted the Swedish government's inquiry into the death of the UN Secretary General Dag Hammarskjöld where he maintained that there was no foul play.

== Early life ==
Rösiö was born on 14 May 1927 in Åmål, Sweden, the son of Birger Rösiö, a district veterinarian, and his wife Jonita (née Hedin). He received a Candidate of Law degree from Uppsala University in 1949 and carried out university studies in Dublin, Vienna, The Hague and Paris from 1947 to 1950 before becoming an attaché at the Ministry for Foreign Affairs in 1951.

== Career ==
Rösiö served at the legation in New Delhi in 1953, at the Consulate General in Bombay in 1954 where he was Trade Commissioner from 1955 to 1958 and where he became vice consul in 1957. He was embassy secretary in Beijing from 1958 to 1959 and secretary at the Swedish Foreign Ministry from 1959 to 1961. There Rösiö was secretary of the administration investigation for aid to developing countries in 1960.

He was then first vice consul in Léopoldville from 1961 to 1962. Rösiö was administrative director of the Dag Hammarskjöld Foundation from 1962 to 1964, first embassy secretary in Washington, D.C. from 1964 to 1965, United Nations Deputy Resident Representative in Algiers in 1965 and embassy counsellor in Khartoum from 1966 to 1969. He was consul general in Houston from 1969 to 1971 and deputy director at the Foreign Ministry from 1972 to 1973. Rösiö was ambassador in Jeddah from 1974 to 1977 (also accredited to Abu Dhabi, Manama, Kuwait City, Muscat, Doha, and Sanaa), ambassador in Islamabad from 1977 to 1979 (also accredited to Malé from 1978), ambassador in Prague from 1979 to 1981 and ambassador in Kuala Lumpur (also accredited to Rangoon) from 1981 to 1985. He was then consul general in Montreal from 1985 to 1990 when he was appointed ambassador-at-large for French-speaking Central Africa at the Swedish Foreign Ministry. He left the post in 1992.

In 1991, following reports in the British press about a Belgian mercenary who claimed he shot down Dag Hammarskjöld's plane on 18 September 1961 (while Rösiö served as consul in Léopoldville), the Swedish government decided to launch a one-man inquiry which was conducted by Rösiö. He pointed out a number of questions in previous reports, but came to the conclusion that the cause of the crash was indisputably pilot error. Claims of the fuselage being riddled with bullet holes were false, a fact to which he could attest since he was one of the first people to inspect the wreckage. He also proved that accounts by mercenaries contained glaring inconsistencies (the fuel tanks of their planes were far too small to cover the distances they claimed). Since the report was submitted in 1993 it has served as Sweden's official stance on what happened in Ndola.

On some of his ambassador posts, he had a large number of dual accreditations and was thus one of the few Swedish diplomats who served in more than 25 countries. Overall, he visited more than 140 countries during his life. Rösiö also penned more than 500 articles after his retirement from the Foreign Service, many of which were later published in anthologies. He was a restless observer of events, both at home and abroad, and perhaps most remembered by his books is Yrke: diplomat (1988) [Occupation: diplomat] which gives a full introduction to what the diplomatic profession entails.

== Personal life ==
On 11 April 1955, at Free Church, New Delhi, Rösiö married Joan Binns (born 1930), daughter of Mrs. E. Kopeliowitch, New Delhi, and Angus Binns. The ceremony was performed by Reverend Tucker, with Miss Ann Ortcheson as the bridesmaid and the groom’s best man being attaché Alf Ros. After the ceremony, the bride’s parents hosted a reception at their home. Among those present were Minister Per Wijkman, Consul General P. H. Rydin, and members of the diplomatic corps in New Delhi. They divorced and in 1969 Rösiö married Görel Pernvik (1941–2021), daughter of the managing director Allan Pernvik and Barbro (née Hermansson). He had two children; Josefine Hjelm and Adrian Rösiö.

== Bibliography ==
- Rösiö, Bengt (2012). Ja: om att säga ja till livet - och lite sökande efter en tid som flytt [Yes: About Saying Yes to Life - and Some Searching for Times Gone by] (in Swedish). Täby: Bengt Rösiö. ISBN 9789163711152. SELIBR 14702376.
- Rösiö, Bengt (2011). Jeurelle 3: en liten festskrift till en älskad maka [Jeurelle 3: A small festschrift to a beloved wife] (in Swedish). Täby: Bengt Rösiö. ISBN 978-91-633-8902-3. SELIBR 12441688.
- Rösiö, Bengt (2010). I huvet på en gammal gubbe: ett sista knippe olydiga texter [In the Head of an Old Man: One Final Collection of Defiant Essays] (in Swedish). Täby: Bengt Rösiö. ISBN 978-91-633-7406-7. SELIBR 12427549.
- Rösiö, Bengt (2009). Hermelin bland katter: ett rapsodiskt och ganska kalejdoskopiskt collage av anteckningar, rapporter, artiklar, brev och annan skrivklåda i och utanför UD-tjänst 1947-2007 [A Stoat Among Cats: A Rhapsodic and Rather Kaleidoscopic Collage of Notes, Reports, Articles, Letters and other Writing During and After Swedish Foreign Service 1947–2007] (in Swedish). Täby: Bengt Rösiö. ISBN 978-91-633-5236-2. SELIBR 11589161.
- Rösiö, Bengt (2007). Ett diplomatliv: från Riyadh till Rangoon : [vår man i sjutton länder] [A diplomat's life: Riyadh to Rangoon: [Our Man in Seventeen Countries]] (in Swedish) (New ed.). Stockholm: CKM. ISBN 978-91-7040-051-3. SELIBR 10416427.
- Rösiö, Bengt (2006). Beskt, sötsurt och sint: ännu ett knippe olydiga texter [Bitter, Sweet and Sour: Yet Another Collection of Defiant Essays] (in Swedish). Täby: Bengt Rösiö. ISBN 91-631-8685-3. SELIBR 10284153.
- Rösiö, Bengt (2003). Träl i paradis: nya texter om diplomati, makt och vanligt folk [Thrall in Paradise: New Texts on Diplomacy, Power and Ordinary People] (in Swedish). Täby: Bengt Rösiö. SELIBR 9731525.
- Rösiö, Bengt (2001). Kongo: anteckningar om Dag Hammarskjöld [Congo: Notes About Dag Hammarskjöld] (in Swedish). Täby: Bengt Rösiö. ISBN 91-631-0942-5. SELIBR 8365252.
- Rösiö, Bengt (2000). Dagtingan och motvalls: texter om diplomati, hyckleri och annan vardag [Remission and Contradiction: Texts on Diplomacy, Hypocrisy and Other Mundane Issues] (in Swedish) (2. tr. ed.). Täby: Bengt Rösiö [distributör]. SELIBR 8237563.
- Rösiö, Bengt (1998). Från Riyadh till Rangoon: snälla och elaka anteckningar från ett lite udda diplomatliv [From Riyadh to Rangoon: Kind and Nasty Commentaries from a Not-so-run-of-the-mill Diplomatic Life] (in Swedish). Stockholm: CKM. ISBN 91-88812-14-6. SELIBR 7775517.
- Rösiö, Bengt (1997). Ndola: en bok om Dag Hammarskjölds död, om FN, Afrika - och ett svek [Ndola: A Book About the Death of Dag Hammarskjöld, the UN, Africa - and a Betrayal] (in Swedish). Stockholm: Nerenius & Santérus. ISBN 91-648-0107-1. SELIBR 7460817.
- Rösiö, Bengt (1995). Ndola eller Hunden som inte skällde [Ndola or The Dog that Did not Bark] (in Swedish). Täby: B. Rösiö. SELIBR 2075506.
- Rösiö, Bengt (1988). Yrke: diplomat [Occupation: diplomat] (in Swedish). Stockholm: Norstedt. ISBN 91-1-883302-0. SELIBR 7154983.
- Rösiö, Bengt (1993). Åter till Afrika [Back to Africa] (in Swedish). [Täby]: [B. Rösiö]. SELIBR 1567156.
- Rösiö, Bengt (1978). Paxx (in Swedish). Stockholm: Rabén & Sjögren. ISBN 91-29-51611-0. SELIBR 7234302.
- Rösiö, Bengt (1974). Det ljuva liket eller Corpse diplomatique [The Delightful Corpse or Corpse Diplomatique] (in Swedish). Stockholm: Rabén & Sjögren. ISBN 91-29-42871-8. SELIBR 7232997.
- Rösiö, Bengt (1970). Malesh: roman [Malesh: novel] (in Swedish). Stockholm: Bonnier. SELIBR 1466387.
- Rösiö, Bengt (1968). Diplomat i u-land [Diplomat in a Third-World Country] (in Swedish). Stockholm: Bonnier. SELIBR 707377.
- Rösiö, Bengt (1967). De vita städerna: en bok om Algeriet [The White Cities: A Book on Algeria] (in Swedish). Stockholm: Bonnier. SELIBR 1466392.
- Rösiö, Birger; Rösiö, Bengt (1949). Quo vadis, species humana?: Vart bär din väg, o människosläkte? [Quo vadis, species humana?: Where are you going, the human species?] (in Latin). Stockholm: Norstedt. SELIBR 1413801.

Diplomatic posts
Preceded by Bengt Åkerrén	Consul of Sweden to Leopoldville; 1961–1962	Succeeded by Axel Lewenhaupt as Ambassador
Preceded by Tore Högstedt	Consul-general of Sweden to Houston; 1969–1971	Succeeded by Vacant
Preceded by Åke Jonsson	Ambassador of Sweden to Saudi Arabia; 1974–1977	Succeeded by Carl-Gustaf Bielke
Preceded by None	Ambassador of Sweden to Oman; 1974–1977	Succeeded by Carl-Gustaf Bielke
Preceded by Åke Jonsson	Ambassador of Sweden to North Yemen; 1974–1977	Succeeded by Carl-Gustaf Bielke
Preceded by Gunnar Gerring	Ambassador of Sweden to Kuwait; 1974–1977	Succeeded by Göran Bundy
Preceded by None	Ambassador of Sweden to Bahrain; 1974–1977	Succeeded by Göran Bundy
Preceded by None	Ambassador of Sweden to the United Arab Emirates; 1974–1977	Succeeded by Göran Bundy
Preceded by None	Ambassador of Sweden to Qatar; 1974–1977	Succeeded by Göran Bundy
Preceded by Rune Nyström	Ambassador of Sweden to Pakistan; 1977–1979	Succeeded by Carl-Johan Groth
Preceded by None	Ambassador of Sweden to the Maldives; 1978–1979	Succeeded by Carl-Johan Groth
Preceded by Sigge Lilliehöök	Ambassador of Sweden to Czechoslovakia; 1979–1981	Succeeded by Olof Skoglund
Preceded by Arne Fältheim	Ambassador of Sweden to Malaysia; 1981–1985	Succeeded by Curt Wiik
Preceded by Arne Fältheim	Ambassador of Sweden to Burma; 1981–1985	Succeeded by Nils-Olov Hasslev
Preceded by Claës Erik Winberg	Consul-general of Sweden to Montreal; 1985–1990	Succeeded by Karin Ahrland
Preceded by Olof Skoglund	Ambassador of Sweden to Zaire; 1990–1992	Succeeded by Carl-Erhard Lindahl
Preceded by Olof Skoglund	Ambassador of Sweden to the Central African Republic; 1990–1992	Succeeded by Carl-Erhard Lindahl
Preceded by Olof Skoglund	Ambassador of Sweden to Equatorial Guinea; 1990–1992	Succeeded by Carl-Erhard Lindahl
Preceded by Olof Skoglund	Ambassador of Sweden to the Republic of the Congo; 1990–1992	Succeeded by Carl-Erhard Lindahl
