= State Secretary for Foreign Affairs (Sweden) =

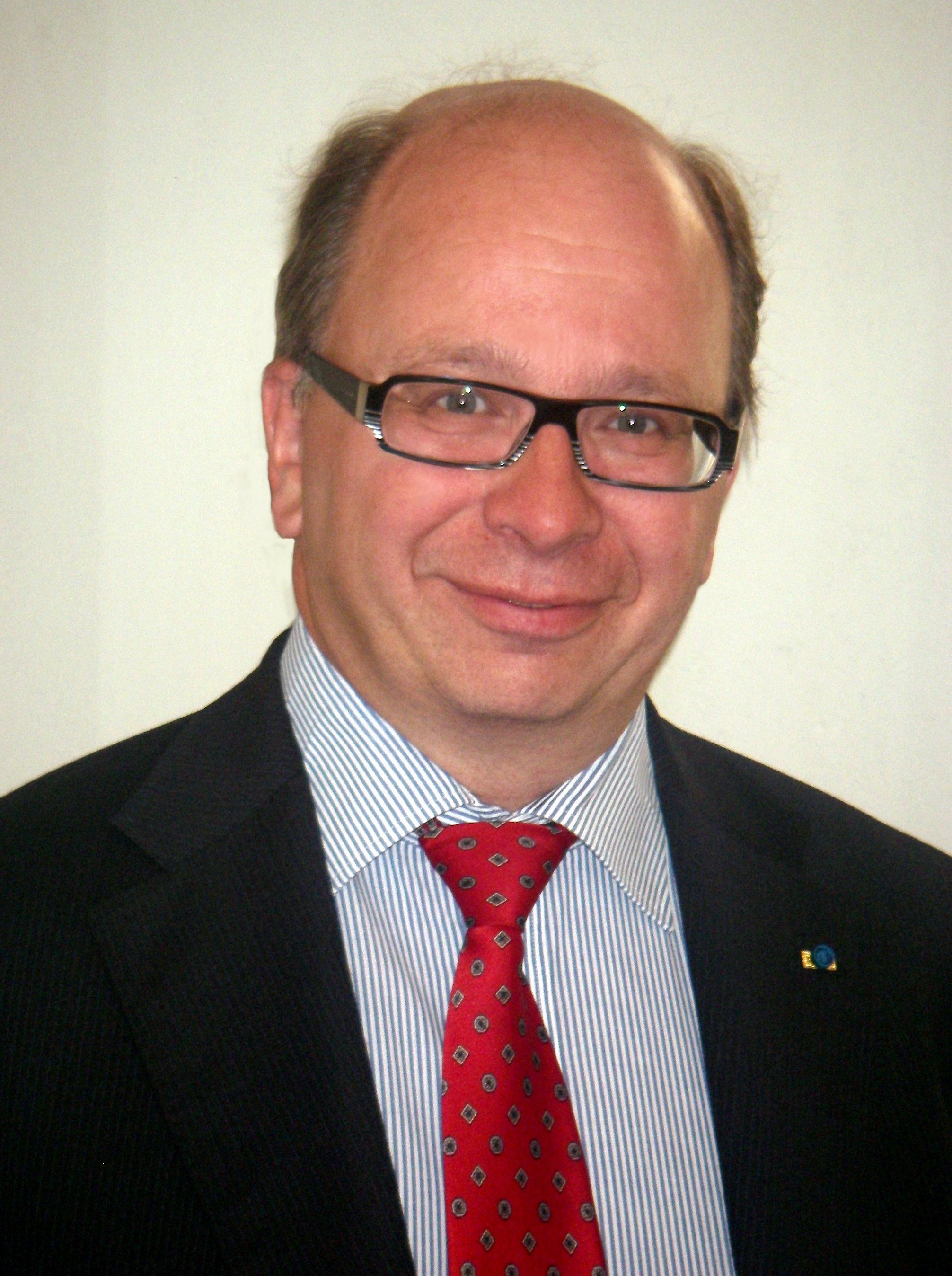
Dag Hartelius is the Swedish State Secretary for Foreign Affairs since september 2024

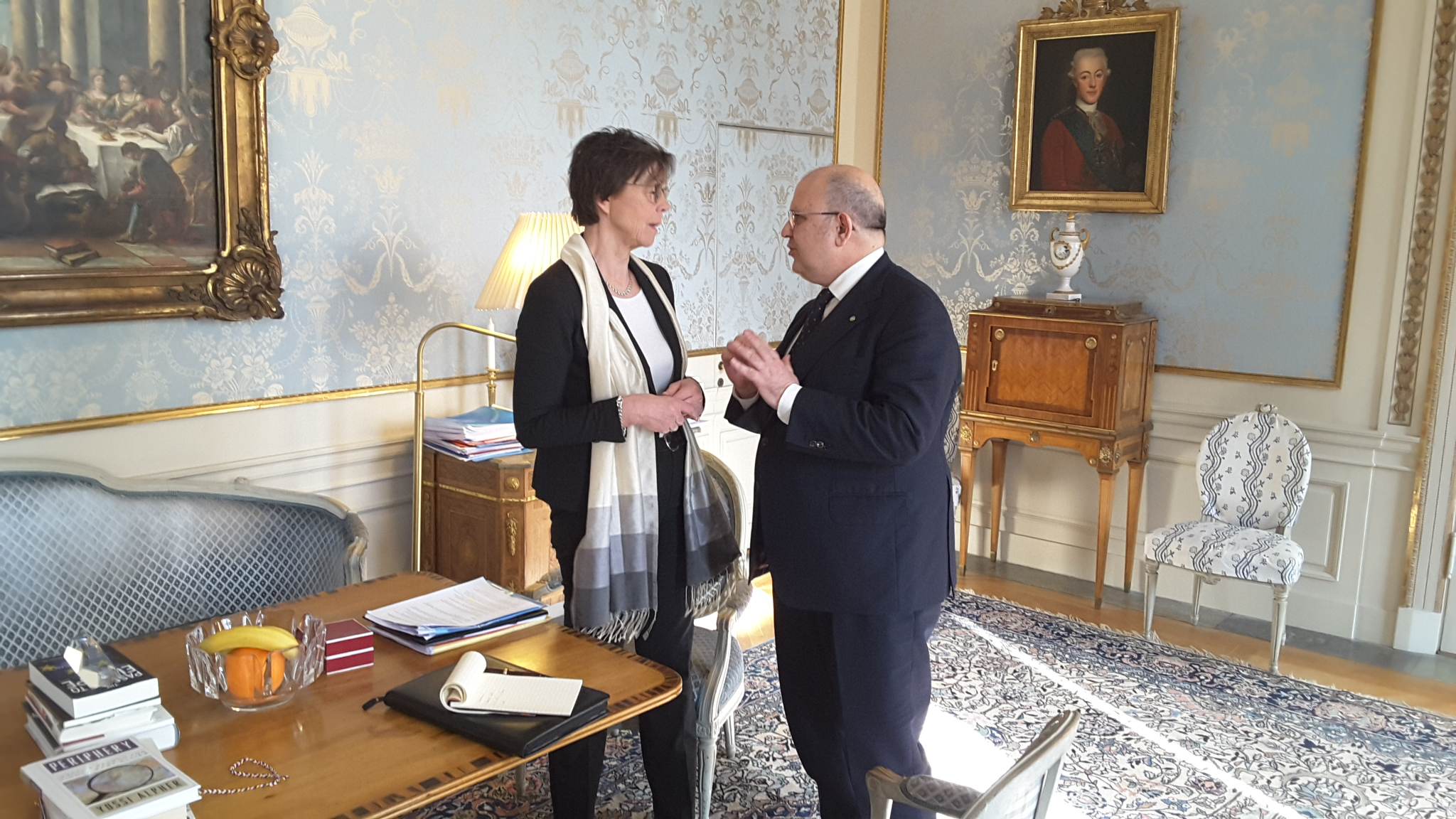
State Secretary for Foreign Affairs Annika Söder and the Greece Foreign Minister for European Affairs Nikos Xydakis in Stockholm 2016.

The State Secretary for Foreign Affairs (Note: State Secretary for Foreign Affairs or Deputy Under Secretary of State for Foreign Affairs.) (Swedish: Kabinettssekreterare) is the highest position below the rank of cabinet minister at the Swedish Ministry for Foreign Affairs. As of 2024, Dag Hartelius is state secretary for foreign affairs.

== History ==
For historical reasons, this position has a different title in Swedish than the other state secretaries of the Swedish government; the other posts are termed statssekreterare.

Before 1945, in a situation where the political head of the ministry often changed rapidly, the Secretary General represented the continuous lines in Sweden's foreign policy; and was considered a prestigious step in the diplomatic career.

From 1932, Sweden has experienced a great deal of stability on the post of foreign minister, and from 1945 and on the post as state secretary for foreign affairs has increasingly been politized and a subject of replacement in connection with shifts of foreign minister. The precise role of the state secretary for foreign affairs has changed from cabinet to cabinet, particularly due to different prime ministers' particular interest and involvement in the shaping of foreign policy.

== List ==
=== State Secretaries for Foreign Affairs ===
- 1791–1792: Aron Isak Silfversparre
- 1792–1801: Schering Rosenhane
- 1801–1805: Gustaf Lagerbielke
- 1805–1809: Gustaf af Wetterstedt
- 1809–1811: Carl Aron Ehrengranat
- 1811–1814: Aron Hjort
- 1814–1817: Erik Julius Lagerheim
- 1817–1825: David von Schulzenheim
- 1825–1831: Elias Lagerheim
- 1831–1840: Albrecht Elof Ihre
- 1840–1855: Ludvig Manderström
- 1855–1859: Albert Ehrensvärd
- 1859–1864: Carl Fredrik Palmstierna
- 1864–1866: Carl Johan Albert Sandströmer
- 1866–1869: Frans Theodor Lindstrand
- 1869–1870: Lave Gustaf Beck-Friis
- 1870–1873: Hans Henrik von Essen
- 1873–1876: Carl Lewenhaupt
- 1876–1886: Alfred Lagerheim
- 1886–1889: Carl Bildt
- 1889–1895: August Gyldenstolpe
- 1895–1900: Arvid Taube
- 1900–1903: Thor von Ditten
- 1903–1905: Eric Trolle
- 1905–1906: Carl Haraldsson Strömfelt
- 1906–1908: Albert Ehrensvärd
- 1908–1913: Fredrik Ramel
- 1913–1918: Oskar Ewerlöf
- 1918–1922: Wollmar Boström
- 1922–1928: Erik Sjöborg
- 1928–1931: Einar Hennings
- 1931–1934: Carl Hamilton
- 1934–1937: Christian Günther
- 1938–1944: Erik Boheman
- 1944–1945: Vacant
- 1945–1945: Stig Sahlin
- 1945–1947: Karl Ivan Westman
- 1947–1949: Hans Beck-Friis
- 1949–1951: Dag Hammarskjöld
- 1951–1956: Arne S. Lundberg
- 1956–1967: Leif Belfrage
- 1967–1972: Ole Jödahl
- 1972–1977: Sverker Åström
- 1977–1982: Leif Leifland
- 1982–1991: Pierre Schori
- 1991–1994: Lars-Åke Nilsson
- 1994–2000: Jan Eliasson
- 2000–2006: Hans Dahlgren
- 2006–2014: Frank Belfrage
- 2014–2019: Annika Söder
- 2019–2022: Robert Rydberg
- 2022–2024: Jan Knutsson
- 2024– : Dag Hartelius

=== Deputy State Secretaries for Foreign Affairs ===
- 1944–1953: Vilhelm Assarsson
- 1953–1956: Leif Belfrage
- 1956–1963: Hubert de Bèsche
- 1964–1967: Nils Montan
- 1968–1971: Göran Ryding
- 1971–1972: Sverker Åström
- 1972–1975: Carl De Geer
- 1975–1978: Bengt Rabaeus
- 1978–1980: Carl-George Crafoord
- 1980–1981: Margareta Hegardt
- 1981–1982: Ulf Dinkelspiel
