= List of ambassadors of Sweden to the United Arab Emirates =

Ambassador of Sweden to the United Arab Emirates
- Lesser coat of arms of the Kingdom of Sweden

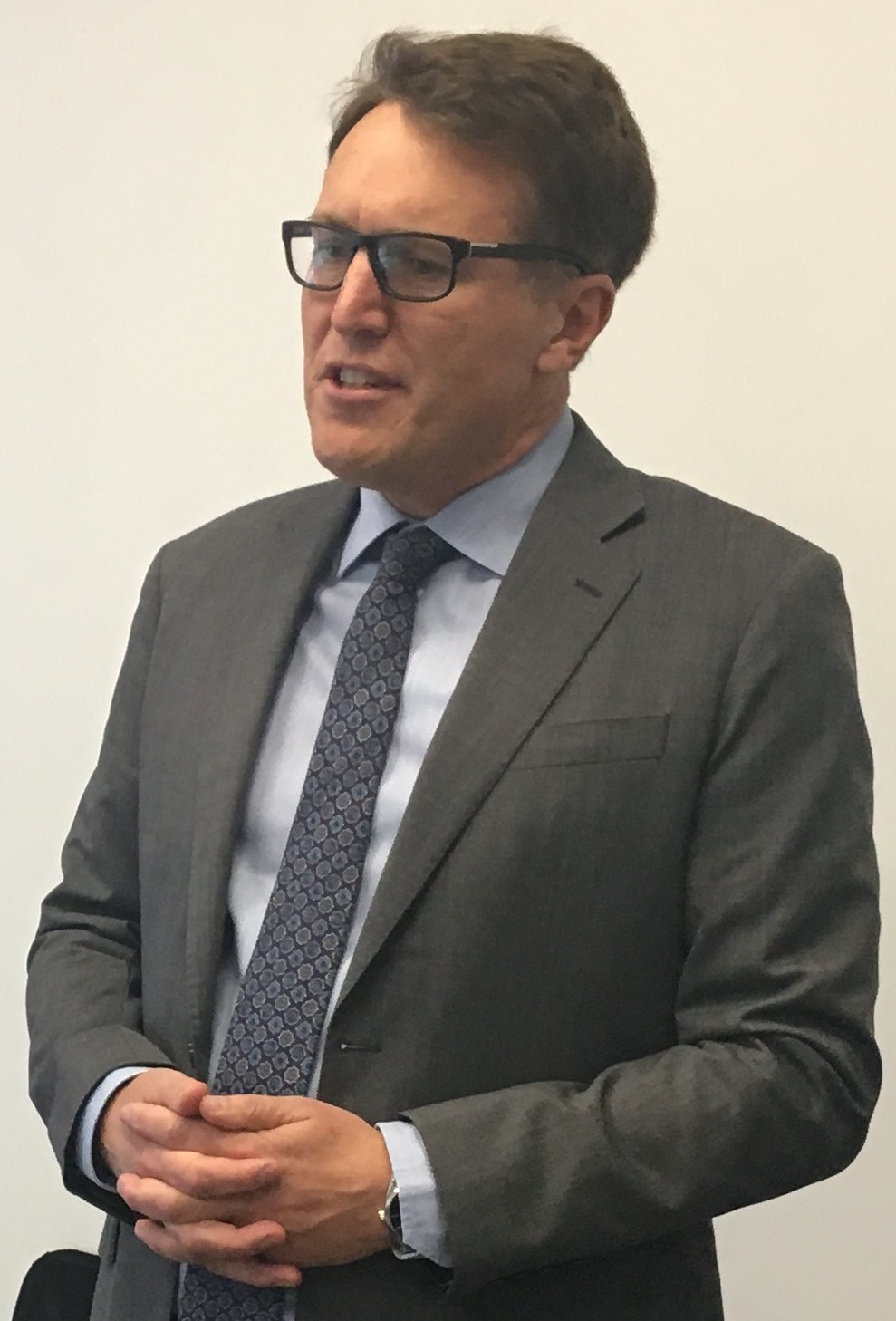
- Incumbent; Fredrik Florén since September 2023
- Ministry for Foreign Affairs; Swedish Embassy, Abu Dhabi
- Style: His or Her Excellency (formal); Mr. or Madam Ambassador (informal)
- Reports to: Minister for Foreign Affairs
- Residence: Royal Marina Village, Villa No 62
- Seat: Abu Dhabi, United Arab Emirates
- Appointer: Government of Sweden
- Term length: No fixed term
- Inaugural holder: Bengt Rösiö
- Formation: 1974
- Website: Swedish Embassy, Abu Dhabi

The Ambassador of Sweden to the United Arab Emirates (known formally as the Ambassador of the Kingdom of Sweden to the United Arab Emirates) is the official representative of the government of Sweden to the president of the United Arab Emirates and federal government of the United Arab Emirates.

== History ==
Diplomatic relations between Sweden and the United Arab Emirates were established in 1972.

In December 1981, a decision was made to open an embassy in Abu Dhabi, to be headed by a chargé d'affaires under the supervision of the Swedish embassy in Kuwait City. In April 1983, Prince Bertil, Duke of Halland inaugurated Sweden's first embassy in Abu Dhabi. The head of the new embassy was Counselor Bengt Lundborg, who was directly subordinate to the Swedish ambassador in Kuwait City, who was concurrently accredited to Abu Dhabi. The embassy was closed in 1993 due to severe budget cuts in the state budget.

Sweden reopened an embassy in Abu Dhabi in February 2002. The Swedish ambassador to the United Arab Emirates is also accredited to Bahrain and Kuwait.

== List of representatives ==
Name	Period	Title	Notes	Presented credentials	Ref
Bengt Rösiö	1974–1977	Ambassador	Resident in Jeddah.		
Göran Bundy	1977–1980	Ambassador	Resident in Kuwait City.		
Thord Bengtson	1980–1982	Ambassador	Resident in Kuwait City.		
Carl-Gustav Åkesson	1983–1986	Ambassador	Resident in Kuwait City.		
Bengt Lundborg	1983–1988	Chargé d'affaires ad interim (Note: Held the diplomatic rank of embassy counsellor.)			
Ulf Norström	1987–1989	Ambassador	Resident in Kuwait City.		
Gudmund Naessén	1988–1993	Chargé d'affaires ad interim			
Ingolf Kiesow	1989–1991 (Note: Ingolf Kiesow was stationed in Kuwait City and also accredited to Abu Dhabi. After the Iraqi invasion of Kuwait on 2 August 1990, Kiesow stayed in Kuwait City until he was forced to leave on 8 September, at which point he was stripped of his diplomatic immunity.)	Ambassador	Resident in Kuwait City.		
Tommy Arwitz	1992–1997	Ambassador	Resident in Kuwait City.		
Thomas Ganslandt	1997–2001	Ambassador	Resident in Kuwait City.		
Lars-Erik Grundell	2001–2005	Ambassador	Also accredited to Doha and Manama (from 2002).		
Bruno Beijer	2005–2010	Ambassador	Also accredited to Doha and Manama.		
Magnus Schöldtz	2010–2011	Ambassador			
Max Bjuhr	2011–2014	Ambassador	Also accredited to Doha and Manama.		
Jan Thesleff	2014–2017	Ambassador	Also accredited to Manama.		
Henrik Landerholm	1 September 2017 – 2021	Ambassador	Also accredited to Kuwait City and Manama.		
Liselott Andersson	2021–2023	Ambassador	Also accredited to Kuwait City and Manama.	15 September 2021	
Fredrik Florén	September 2023 – present	Ambassador	Also accredited to Kuwait City and Manama.	7 March 2024	
