= Annika Söder =

Swedish diplomat and politician

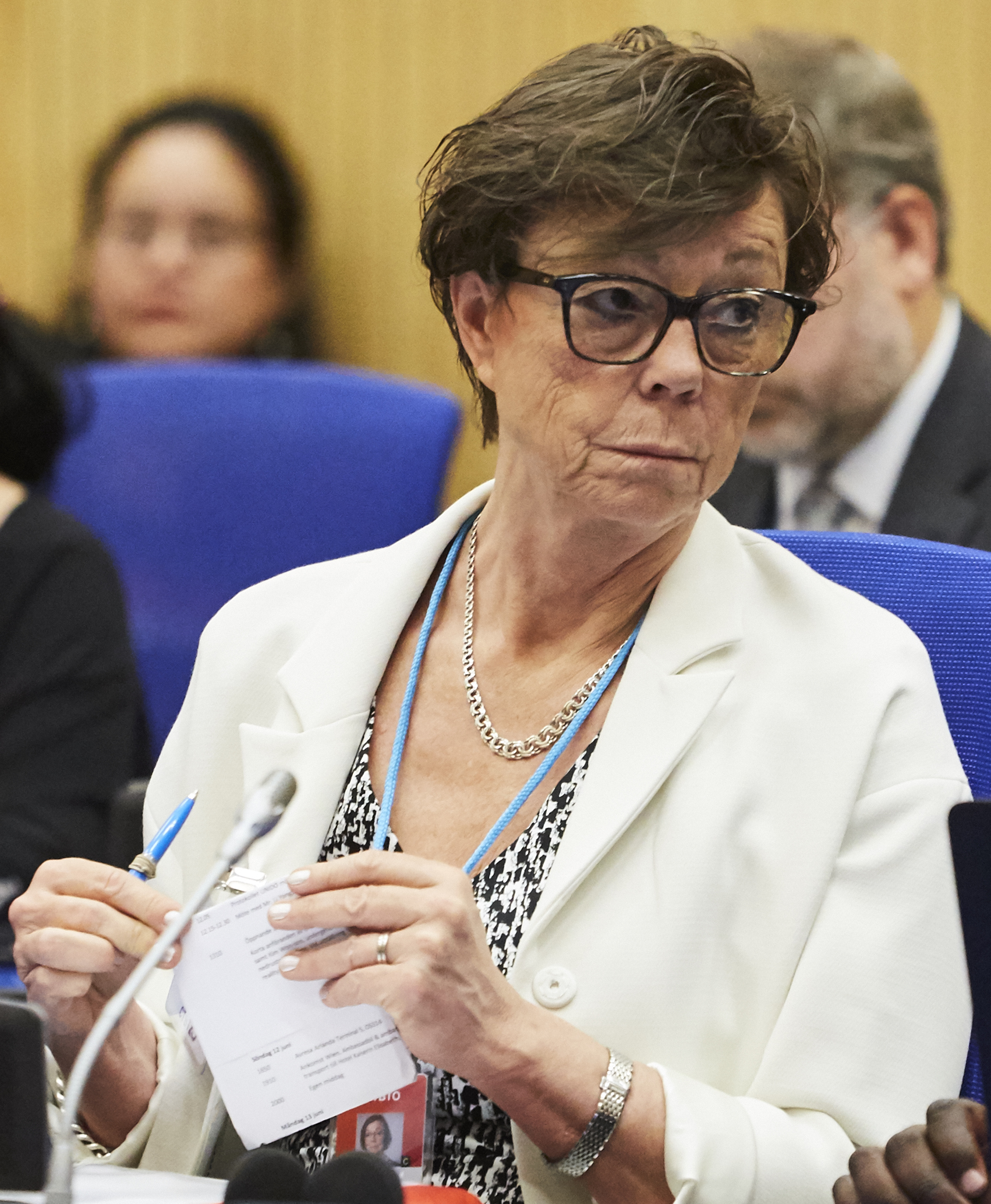
Annika Söder in 2016

Karin Annika Bjurner Söder (born 1955) is a Swedish diplomat and politician representing the Swedish Social Democratic Party. From 2014 to 2019, she served as Sweden's State Secretary for Foreign Affairs. In February 2020, she was appointed by UN Secretary-General António Guterres to collaborate with a UN group on peace building and in January 2021, she was engaged by OSCE chair Ann Linde as her special representative for the South Caucasus. On 18 January 2023, with ministerial backing from Germany and Sweden, she became a member of the International Commission on Inclusive Peace.

== Early life ==
Born on 22 June 1955, Karin Annika Bjurner Söder is the daughter of the politician Gunnar Söder and Karin Söder, Minister for Foreign Affairs 1976–1978. She lives in Stockholm and is married to the diplomat Anders Bjurner. From 1974 to 1976, she attended the Stockholm School of Journalism, specializing in French language and law at the university level.

== Career ==
From 1976 to 1982, Söder worked as a journalist for Sveriges Radio. In 1983, she joined the Swedish Ministry for Foreign Affairs where she served as ambassador from 1996. Over the years, she has had responsibilities as a spokesperson for the ministry and has held positions on security policy and EU and UN issues. In particular, she has worked as a foreign policy advisor to prime ministers and ministers and has served as state secretary for international development. After a period as executive director of the Dag Hammarskjöld Foundation in Uppsala, from 2014 to 2019 she was state secretary for foreign affairs, where she coordinated work on conflict resolution in connection with North Korea, Venezuela, and Yemen.

In February 2020, Söder was appointed by UN Secretary-General António Guterres to collaborate with a UN group on peace building and in January 2021, she was engaged by OSCE chair Ann Linde as her special representative for the South Caucasus. On 18 January 2023, with ministerial backing from Germany and Sweden, she became a member of the International Commission on Inclusive Peace.

== Awards and decorations ==
- Grand Decoration of Honour in Gold with Star for Services to the Republic of Austria (25 September 1997)
