= List of ambassadors of Sweden to Kuwait =

Ambassador of Sweden to Kuwait
- Lesser coat of arms of the Kingdom of Sweden

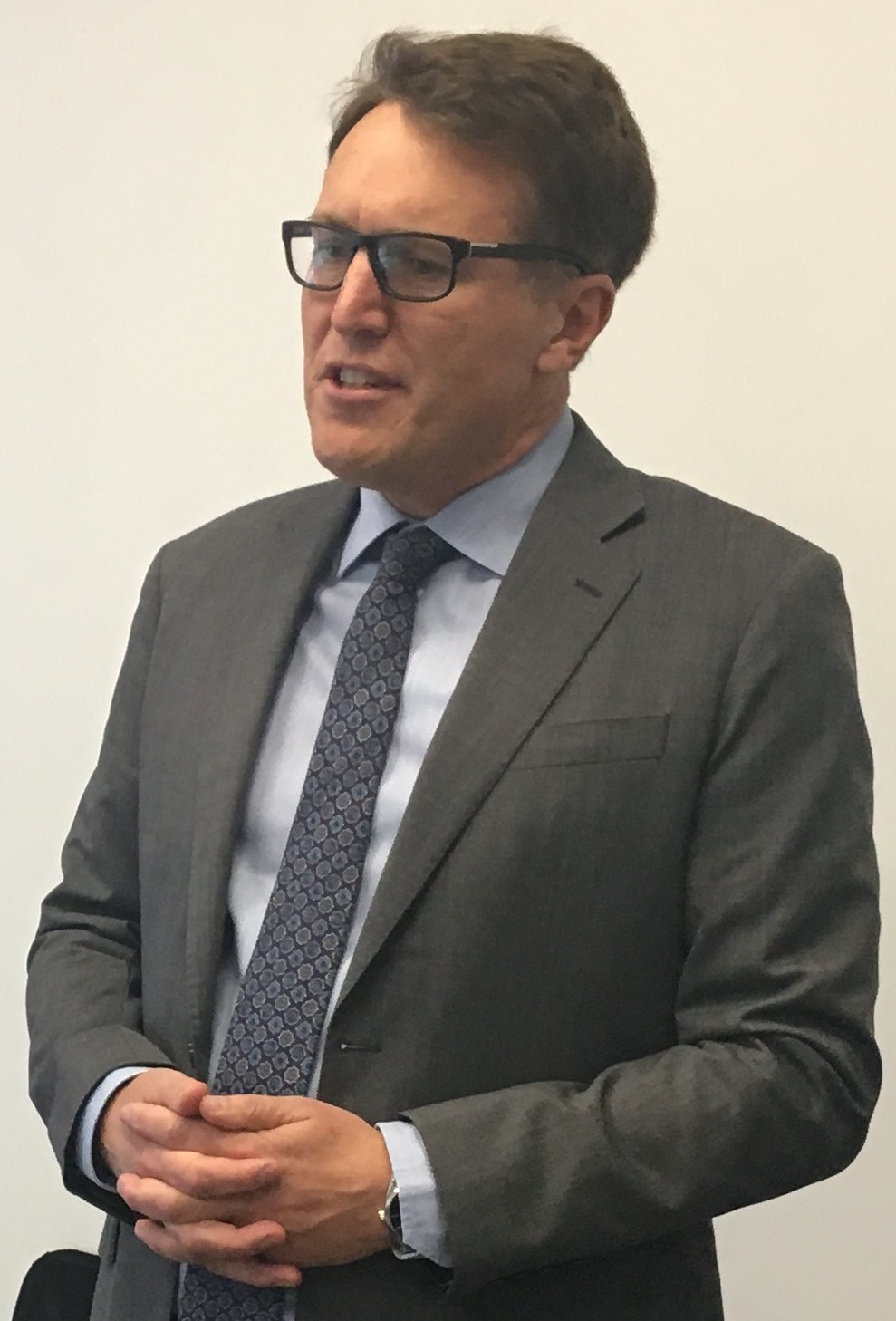
- Incumbent; Fredrik Florén since September 2023
- Ministry for Foreign Affairs; Swedish Embassy, Abu Dhabi
- Style: His or Her Excellency (formal); Mr. or Madam Ambassador (informal)
- Reports to: Minister for Foreign Affairs
- Seat: Abu Dhabi, United Arab Emirates (Note: Since 2017, the Swedish ambassador in Abu Dhabi, United Arab Emirates has a dual accreditation to Kuwait City.)
- Appointer: Government of Sweden
- Term length: No fixed term
- Inaugural holder: Bengt Odhner
- Formation: 23 April 1965

The Ambassador of Sweden to Kuwait (known formally as the Ambassador of the Kingdom of Sweden to the State of Kuwait) is the official representative of the government of Sweden to the emir of Kuwait and government of Kuwait. Since 2017, Sweden’s ambassador has been based in Abu Dhabi, with concurrent accreditation to Kuwait.

== History ==
Diplomatic relations between Sweden and Kuwait were established in 1965. On 23 April 1965, Sweden’s ambassador in Baghdad, Iraq, Bengt Odhner, was also appointed ambassador to Kuwait. On 19 May 1965, Odhner presented his credentials to Crown Prince Abdullah Al-Salim Al-Sabah.

In 1971, a salaried consul was appointed as trade attaché at Sweden’s honorary consulate general in Kuwait City.

In January 1974, Sweden decided to open an embassy in Kuwait, initially headed by a counsellor serving as chargé d’affaires ad interim. From that year, Sweden’s ambassador in Jeddah, Saudi Arabia, was also accredited to Kuwait City. In 1977, Sweden appointed its first resident ambassador in Kuwait City. From the same year, the ambassador was also accredited to Abu Dhabi, Doha, and Manama.

On 2 August 1990, Iraq invaded Kuwait. A week later, on 9 August, the Swedish embassy in Kuwait City received a direct order from the Iraqi Ministry of Foreign Affairs to close by 24 August. The letter declared that all diplomatic missions in Kuwait no longer had any official duties and that diplomatic activities were to be transferred to Baghdad. The Swedish government refused to comply with this request. On 24 August, Iraqi occupation forces were stationed outside at least six embassies in Kuwait City, including Sweden’s. Ambassador Ingolf Kiesow and Embassy Secretary Lars-Erik Paulsson remained in Kuwait to keep the embassy open. On 8 September, they were forced to leave and were taken to Baghdad. Kiesow returned to Kuwait in March 1991.

In 2001, Sweden closed its embassy in Kuwait. Since 2017, Sweden’s ambassador in Abu Dhabi has also been accredited to Kuwait.

== List of representatives ==
| Name | Period | Resident/Non resident | Title | Notes | Presented credentials | Ref |
|---|---|---|---|---|---|---|
| Bengt Odhner | 1965–1969 | Non-resident | Ambassador | Resident in Baghdad. | 19 May 1965 | |
| Gunnar Gerring | 1969–1973 | Non-resident | Ambassador | Resident in Baghdad. | | |
| Bengt Rösiö | 1974–1977 | Non-resident | Ambassador | Resident in Jeddah. | | |
| Thord Bengtson | 1974–1977 | Resident | Chargé d'affaires ad interim (Note: Held the diplomatic rank of embassy counsellor.) | | | |
| Göran Bundy | 1977–1980 | Resident | Ambassador | Also accredited to Abu Dhabi, Doha, and Manama. | | |
| Thord Bengtson | 1980–1982 | Resident | Ambassador | Also accredited to Abu Dhabi, Doha, and Manama. | | |
| Carl-Gustav Åkesson | 1983–1986 | Resident | Ambassador | Also accredited to Abu Dhabi, Doha, and Manama. | | |
| Ulf Norström | 1987–1989 | Resident | Ambassador | Also accredited to Abu Dhabi, Doha, and Manama. | | |
| Ingolf Kiesow | 1989–1991 (Note: After the Iraqi invasion of Kuwait on 2 August 1990, Ingolf Kiesow stayed in Kuwait City until he was forced to leave on 8 September, at which point he was stripped of his diplomatic immunity. Kiesow returned to Kuwait in March 1991.) | Resident | Ambassador | Also accredited to Abu Dhabi, Doha, and Manama. | | |
| Tommy Arwitz | 1992–1997 | Resident | Ambassador | Also accredited to Abu Dhabi, Doha, and Manama. | | |
| Thomas Ganslandt | 1997–2001 | Resident | Ambassador | Also accredited to Abu Dhabi, Doha, and Manama. | | |
| Åke Karlsson | 2001–2006 | Non-resident | Ambassador | Resident in Riyadh. | | |
| Jan Thesleff | 2006–2011 | Non-resident | Ambassador | Resident in Riyadh. | | |
| Dag Juhlin-Dannfelt | 2011–2016 | Non-resident | Ambassador | Resident in Riyadh. | | |
| Henrik Landerholm | 2017–2021 | Non-resident | Ambassador | Resident in Abu Dhabi. | | |
| Liselott Andersson | 2021–2023 | Non-resident | Ambassador | Resident in Abu Dhabi. | 31 May 2023 | |
| Fredrik Florén | September 2023 – present | Non-resident | Ambassador | Resident in Abu Dhabi. | January 2025 | |
