= List of ambassadors of Sweden to Saudi Arabia =

Ambassador of Sweden to Saudi Arabia
- Lesser coat of arms of the Kingdom of Sweden

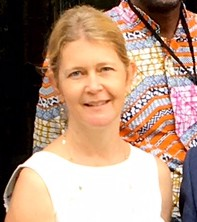
- Incumbent; Maria Håkansson since August 2026
- Ministry for Foreign Affairs; Swedish Embassy, Riyadh
- Style: His or Her Excellency (formal); Mr. or Madam Ambassador (informal)
- Reports to: Minister for Foreign Affairs
- Residence: 3743 Tayma Street, Diplomatic Quarter (Note: The ambassador's residence is at the same location as the chancery.)
- Seat: Riyadh, Saudi Arabia
- Appointer: Government of Sweden
- Term length: No fixed term
- Inaugural holder: Brynolf Eng
- Formation: 1957
- Website: Swedish Embassy, Riyadh

The Ambassador of Sweden to Sudia Arabia (known formally as the Ambassador of the Kingdom of Sweden to Kingdom of Saudi Arabia) is the official representative of the government of Sweden to the monarch and government of Saudi Arabia. The ambassador has a dual accreditation to Muscat (Oman) and to Sanaa (Yemen).

== History ==
Sweden's first ambassador accredited to Saudi Arabia was Brynolf Eng, who was the Swedish envoy in Cairo starting in 1957. Later, the Swedish ambassador in Beirut, Lebanon, was accredited to Saudi Arabia.

At the beginning of 1967, a permanent representation was established in Saudi Arabia's commercial center, Jeddah, under the leadership of a chargé d'affaires ad interim. The office was subordinate to the Swedish ambassador in Beirut, Lebanon.

In December 1973, Bengt Rösiö was appointed as Sweden's first resident ambassador in Jeddah, Saudi Arabia.

Since 1974, Sweden's ambassador to Saudi Arabia has been concurrently accredited to neighboring countries: Kuwait (1974–1977, 2001–2016), Oman (1974–present), Qatar (1974–1977), United Arab Emirates (1974–1977), and Yemen (Note: Yemen Arab Republic (1974–1990) and Republic of Yemen (1990–present).) (1974–present).

== List of representatives ==
Name	Period	Title	Notes	Presented credentials	Ref
Brynolf Eng	1957–1960	Envoy	Resident in Cairo.		
Gösta Brunnström	1960–1965	Ambassador	Resident in Beirut.		
Claës Ivar Wollin	1965–1969	Ambassador	Resident in Beirut.		
Vidar Hellners	1967–1970	Chargé d'affaires ad interim (Note: Held the diplomatic rank of embassy counsellor.)			
Åke Jonsson	1969–1974	Ambassador	Resident in Beirut.		
Karl-Vilhelm Wöhler	1970–1974	Chargé d'affaires ad interim (Note: Sköldenberg (1974), p. 382 states embassy counsellor, Uddling & Paabo (1992), p. 1212 states chargé d'affaires, and Svenska Dagbladet reports that he was appointed first embassy secretary and chargé d'affaires ad interim.)			
Bengt Rösiö	1974–1977	Ambassador	Also accredited in Abu Dhabi, Doha, Kuwait City, Manama, Muscat, and Sanaa.		
Carl-Gustaf Bielke	1977–1980	Ambassador	Also accredited in Muscat and Sanaa.		
Fredrik Bergenstråhle	1980–1984	Ambassador	Also accredited in Muscat and Sanaa.		
Frank Belfrage	1984–1987	Ambassador	Also accredited in Muscat and Sanaa.		
Lennart Alvin	1987–1991	Ambassador	Also accredited in Muscat and Sanaa.		
Steen Hohwü-Christensen	1991–1996	Ambassador	Also accredited in Muscat and Sanaa.		
Lave Johnsson	1996–2000	Ambassador	Also accredited in Muscat and Sanaa (until 1999 (Note: In the 2000 edition of the Sveriges statskalender, Lave Johnsson is listed as ambassador to Yemen. The 2003 edition lists Bengt Sparre as ambassador to Yemen from 1999.)).		
Anders Bengtcén	2000–2001	Chargé d'affaires			
Åke Karlsson	2001–2006	Ambassador	Also accredited in Kuwait City, Muscat, and Sanaa (from 2003).		
Jan Thesleff	2006–2011	Ambassador	Also accredited in Kuwait City, Muscat, and Sanaa.		
Dag Juhlin-Dannfelt	September 2011 – August 2016	Ambassador	Also accredited in Kuwait City, Muscat, and Sanaa.		
Jan Knutsson	September 2016 – 2019	Ambassador	Also accredited in Muscat and Sanaa.		
Niclas Trouvé	1 September 2019 – 2022	Ambassador	Also accredited in Muscat and Sanaa.	23 October 2019.	
Petra Menander	September 2022 – 2026	Ambassador	Also accredited in Muscat and Sanaa.	26 March 2024	
Maria Håkansson	August 2026 – present	Ambassador			

== See also ==
- List of ambassadors of Saudi Arabia to Sweden
