= List of ambassadors of Saudi Arabia to Sweden =

Coordinates: 59.345883°N 18.067847°E

Ambassador of Saudi Arabia to Sweden
- سفير خادم الحرمين الشريفين لدى مملكة السويد (Ambassador of the Custodian of the Two Holy Mosques to the Kingdom of Sweden)
- Coat of Arms of Saudi Arabia

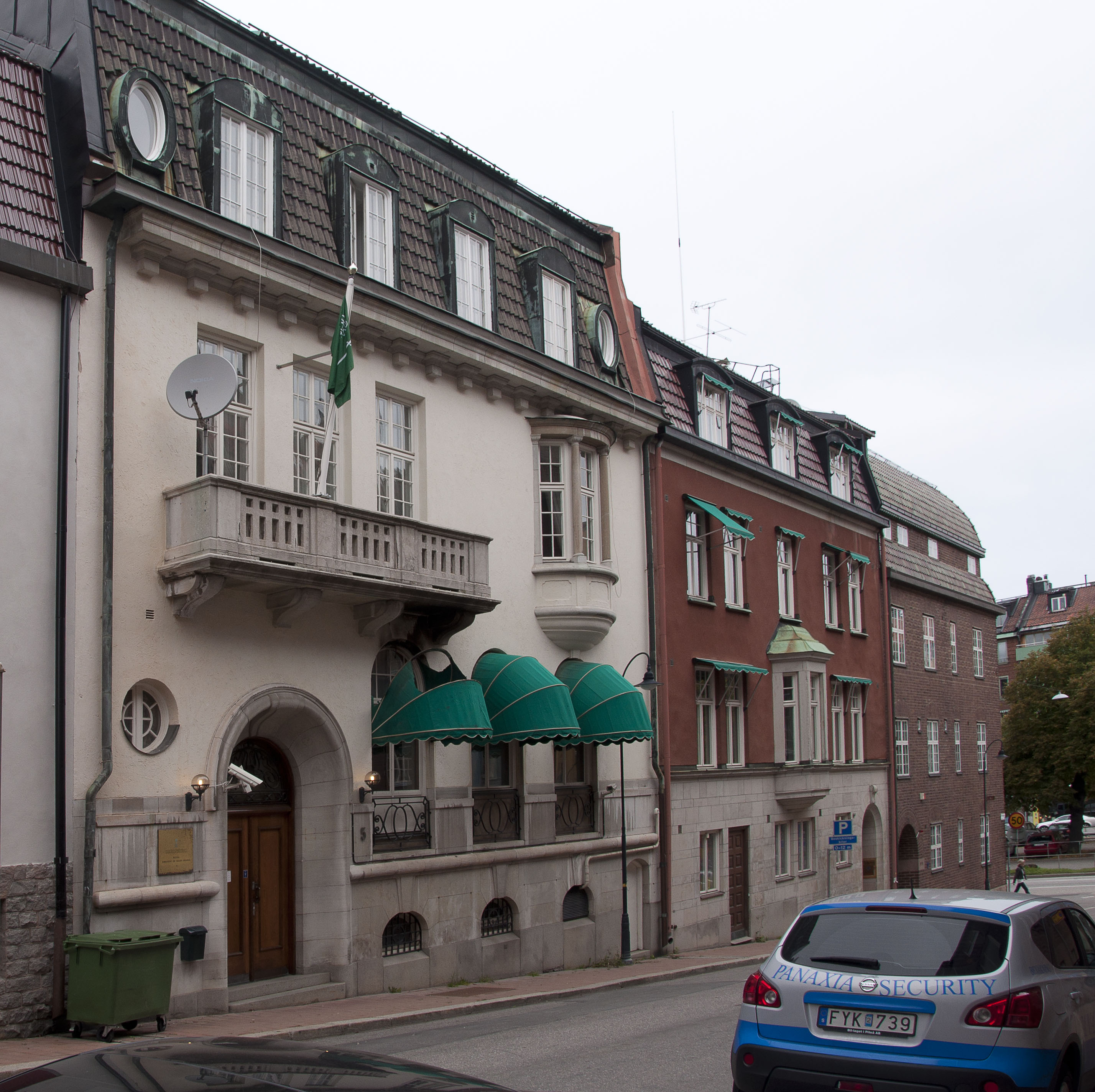
- Incumbent; Einas Al-Shahwan since April 22, 2021
- Inaugural holder: Jawad Mustafa Zikri
- Formation: January 1, 1957

The Saudi ambassador in Stockholm is the official representative of the Government in Riyadh to the Government of Sweden. With residence in Stockholm he is concurrently accredited in Oslo and Copenhague. In 2017, Swedish military exports rose by two percent, totalling 11.3 billion Swedish krona, of which exports to Saudi Arabia accounted for 7 million Swedish krona.

== List of representatives ==
Diplomatic accreditation	Ambassador	Observations	King of Saudi Arabia	List of prime ministers of Sweden	Term end
January 1, 1957	Jawad Mustafa Zikri		Saud of Saudi Arabia	Tage Erlander	December 31, 1963
January 1, 1968	Nasser AlManqour	Sheikh Nasser Al-Manquor	Faisal of Saudi Arabia	Tage Erlander	December 31, 1973
January 1, 1985	Abdullah Mosa	Chargé d'affaires	Fahd of Saudi Arabia	Olof Palme	
January 1, 1994	Marwan Bashir al-Roume	Chargé d'affaires	Fahd of Saudi Arabia	Ingvar Carlsson	December 31, 1994
January 1, 2002	Ismail Hasan Al-Ajlan	Chargé d'affaires	Fahd of Saudi Arabia	Göran Persson	December 31, 2003
January 1, 2004	Badr bin Othman Bakhsh	1988: Permanent Observer of Saudi Arabia to the Organization of American States. 1992 in Madrid.	Fahd of Saudi Arabia	Göran Persson	December 31, 2005
May 20, 2008	Abdulrahman ben Mohamad al Gdaia	Abdulrahman M. Gdala	Abdullah of Saudi Arabia	Fredrik Reinfeldt	December 9, 2013
May 20, 2014	Ibrahim Saad Al-Ibrahim		Abdullah of Saudi Arabia	Stefan Löfven	January 12, 2017
January 12, 2017	Abdulaziz bin Hamoud Al-Zaid		Salman of Saudi Arabia	Stefan Löfven	April 22, 2021
April 22, 2021	Einas Al-Shahwan		Salman of Saudi Arabia	Stefan Löfven	
