= List of ambassadors of Sweden to Australia =

Ambassador of Sweden to Australia
- Lesser coat of arms of the Kingdom of Sweden
- Incumbent; Klas Molin since 2025
- Ministry for Foreign Affairs; Swedish Embassy, Canberra
- Style: His or Her Excellency (formal); Mr. or Madam Ambassador (informal)
- Reports to: Minister for Foreign Affairs
- Residence: 5 Turrana Street, Yarralumla (Note: The ambassador's residence is at the same location as the chancery.)
- Seat: Canberra, Australia
- Appointer: Government of Sweden
- Term length: No fixed term
- Inaugural holder: Constans Lundquist
- Formation: August 1947
- Website: Swedish Embassy, Canberra

The Ambassador of Sweden to Australia (known formally as the Ambassador of the Kingdom of Sweden to the Commonwealth of Australia) is the official representative of the government of Sweden to the governor-general and the Australian government.

== History ==
In 1945, Constans Lundquist was appointed consul general at Sydney with jurisdiction in the Fiji Islands. He was appointed as Sweden's first envoy to Sydney in August 1947 when the Swedish legation was established and the consulate general closed. In October 1947, he presented his credentials in Canberra as Sweden's first envoy to Australia to Governor-General William McKell.

In November 1963, an agreement was reached between the Swedish and Australian governments on the mutual elevation of the respective countries' legations to embassies. The diplomatic rank was thereafter changed to ambassador instead of envoy extraordinary and minister plenipotentiary.

== List of representatives ==
Name	Period	Title	Resident / Concurrent accreditation	Notes	Presented credentials	Ref
Constans Lundquist	August 1947 – 26 April 1950	Envoy		Died in office.		
Bo Alander	1950–1951	Chargé d'affaires ad interim				
Martin Kastengren	1 October 1951 – 30 June 1957	Envoy		Also accredited to New Zealand.		
Alf Ros	27 February 1954 – 1954	Chargé d'affaires ad interim				
Otto Johansson	April 1954 – October 1954	Chargé d'affaires ad interim		Protecting power mission for the Soviet Union in Canberra during Envoy Kastengren's vacation.		
Göran Bundy	12 March 1957 – 1 October 1957	Chargé d'affaires ad interim				
Carl Bergenstråhle	1 October 1957 – 1960	Envoy			October 1957	
Nils-Eric Ekblad	1960–1963	Envoy				
Gösta af Petersens	June 1963 – November 1963	Envoy				
Gösta af Petersens	November 1963 – 15 August 1969	Ambassador		Died in office. (Note: Died during his vacation in Stockholm.)		
Per Anger	1970–1975	Ambassador				
Per Lind	1975–1979	Ambassador	Also accredited to Papua New Guinea (from 1977)			
Lars Hedström	1979–1985	Ambassador	Also accredited to Papua New Guinea, Solomon Islands, and Vanuatu (from 1982 (Note: Another source says the year was 1981.))			
Hans Björk	1986–1990	Ambassador	Also accredited to Papua New Guinea, Solomon Islands, and Vanuatu			
Bo Heinebäck	1990–1994	Ambassador	Also accredited to Papua New Guinea (from 1991), Solomon Islands, and Vanuatu			
Göran Hasselmark	1994–2000	Ambassador	Also accredited to Cook Islands, (Note: Spiegelberg (1999) p. 174 states that he was accredited to the Cook Islands while the same source p. 177 states that the post was vacant.) New Zealand (from 1995), and Solomon Islands (until 1995)			
Lars-Erik Wingren	2000–2003	Ambassador	Also accredited to New Zealand, Tonga (from 2002), and Vanuatu (from 2002)			
Karin Ehnbom-Palmquist	2003–2008	Ambassador	Also accredited to New Zealand.			(Note: Greger Widgren was Stockholm-based ambassador for Fiji, Papua New Guinea, Samoa, Solomon Islands, Tonga, and Vanuatu from 2003 to 2008.)
Sven-Olof Petersson	2008–2014	Ambassador	Also accredited to Fiji, New Zealand, Papua New Guinea, Samoa, Solomon Islands, Tonga, and Vanuatu			
Pär Ahlberger	2014–2019	Ambassador	Also accredited to Fiji, New Zealand, Kiribati, Nauru, Papua New Guinea, Samoa, Solomon Islands, Tonga, Tuvalu, and Vanuatu		16 July 2014	
Henrik Cederin	1 September 2019 – 2022	Ambassador	Also accredited to Fiji (from 15 March 2022) and New Zealand (from January 2020)		20 September 2019	
Pontus Melander	10 October 2022 – 2025	Ambassador	Also accredited to Fiji (from 26 October 2023), New Zealand (from 16 November 2022), and Tonga (from 16 April 2024)		10 October 2022	
Klas Molin	2025–present	Ambassador	Also accredited to New Zealand.		18 September 2025	

== See also ==
- Australia–Sweden relations
- Embassy of Sweden, Canberra
