= Eyvind Bratt =

Swedish diplomat (1907–1987)

- Bratt circa 1954
- Born: Björn Axel Eyvind Bratt; 30 June 1907; Stockholm, Sweden
- Died: 16 January 1987 (aged 79); Spain
- Education: Uppsala University; Stockholm University College
- Occupation: Diplomat
- Years active: 1931–1973
- Spouse(s): Carin Robbert (m. 1939) Sonia Wyrill (m. 1963)
- Children: 3

Björn Axel Eyvind Bratt (30 June 1907 – 16 January 1987) was a Swedish diplomat, author, and translator. He joined the Swedish Ministry for Foreign Affairs in 1931 and subsequently held diplomatic and consular positions in the United States, Germany, Ethiopia, South Africa, Iran, Afghanistan, and Ireland. Bratt served as first vice consul at the Swedish Consulate General in Chicago from 1943 and as consul in New York City from 1946. He returned to the Ministry for Foreign Affairs in 1947, where he became a director and later served as secretary of the Committee on Foreign Affairs. In 1951 he was appointed consul general in Berlin.

From 1953 to 1959, Bratt was Sweden's envoy in Addis Ababa, also accredited to Khartoum from 1957. During his posting in Ethiopia, he was involved in Swedish-Ethiopian educational and technical cooperation, including the establishment of a Swedish-Ethiopian Institute of Building Technology. He also represented Sweden on special diplomatic missions, including the inauguration of Liberian President William Tubman in 1956. From 1959 to 1963, Bratt served as Sweden's envoy in Pretoria. During this period he assisted Swedish nationals in connection with the South African authorities and took part in the diplomatic response following the death of UN Secretary-General Dag Hammarskjöld in 1961, travelling to Ndola and subsequently serving as an observer in the investigation into the aircraft crash.

Bratt was ambassador to Iran and Afghanistan from 1964 to 1967, based in Tehran. During this period he represented Sweden in development and humanitarian cooperation, including the reconstruction of the Iranian village of Feyzabad following the 1962 Buin Zahra earthquake. From 1967 to 1973, he served as Sweden's ambassador in Dublin. Alongside his diplomatic career, Bratt pursued academic and literary work. He received a PhD from Uppsala University in 1951 and published books based partly on his experiences abroad. He also translated literary works into Swedish, including poetry by Czesław Miłosz and Sergei Yesenin.

== Early life ==
Bratt was born on 30 June 1907 in Stockholm, Sweden, the son of Arnold "Arne" Bratt, a lecturer, and Amy (née Berggren). Bratt was born in Södermalm in Stockholm, spent his school years in Falun, and his university years in Uppsala.

On 30 October 1928, Bratt received a Bachelor of Arts degree from Uppsala University, where he was a member of Västmanlands-Dala nation. In early November 1929, he completed supplementary examinations for his Bachelor of Arts degree.

== Career ==
Bratt began his career as an attaché at the Ministry for Foreign Affairs in 1931. He passed the civil service examination (kansliexamen) at Stockholm University College on 10 March 1934. He was appointed second secretary in 1937 and first secretary in 1939, and in July 1943 became first vice consul at the Swedish Consulate General in Chicago.

In 1946, Bratt was appointed consul in New York City, and in 1947 he became a director at the Ministry for Foreign Affairs. In 1949, he served as secretary of the Committee on Foreign Affairs and, that same year, earned a Licentiate of Philosophy degree from Uppsala University. In 1951, Bratt was appointed consul, with the rank of consul general, in Berlin. That same year, he received his Doctor of Philosophy degree from Uppsala University.

From 1953 to 1959, he served as envoy in Addis Ababa, and from 1957 to 1959 was also accredited to Khartoum. He presented his credentials to Emperor Haile Selassie on 16 October 1953. In December 1953, Bratt was appointed by the National Swedish Board of Education as inspector of the Swedish schools in Addis Ababa and Bishoftu. On 5 November 1954, the Swedish government appointed him special representative for the implementation of an agreement establishing a Swedish-Ethiopian Institute of Building Technology. The institute was inaugurated in Addis Ababa in February 1957, in the presence of, among others, Bratt and Emperor Haile Selassie.

In November 1954, Bratt took part in Emperor Haile Selassie's state visit to Sweden. In early January 1956, he was appointed ambassadeur en mission spéciale (ambassador on a special mission) to officially represent the Swedish government in Liberia at the inauguration ceremonies of President William Tubman and Vice President William Tolbert. In February 1958, Bratt was appointed, together with Knut Hammarskjöld, chairman and head of department at the National Swedish Board of Civil Aviation (Luftfartsstyrelsen), as a representative in aviation negotiations with Sudan in the capital, Khartoum. In December 1959, Bratt accompanied Prince Bertil, Duke of Halland during his visit to Ethiopia, during which the Ethio-Swedish Pediatric Clinic was inaugurated.

From 1959 to 1963, Bratt served as envoy to Pretoria. In February 1960, he presented his credentials in Pretoria to the Governor-General, C. R. Swart. In February 1961, Bratt assisted the Swedish author Sara Lidman in Johannesburg after she was arrested and charged by the South African authorities under the Immorality Act for associating with Peter Nthite, a former secretary of the African National Congress Youth League. Following the death of Swedish UN Secretary-General Dag Hammarskjöld in the Ndola Transair Sweden Douglas DC-6 crash in September 1961, Bratt travelled to Ndola in Northern Rhodesia to assist the authorities and the crash investigation commission. He subsequently served as an observer in the investigation initiated by the authorities of the Central African Federation.

From 1964 to 1967, Bratt served as ambassador to Tehran and Kabul. In January 1964, he inaugurated the "Swedish village" of Feyzabad in Qazvin province. The village had been destroyed, along with approximately 300 other Iranian villages, in the 1962 Buin Zahra earthquake. Its reconstruction was financed by Swedish funds, including contributions from the Swedish government, Save the Children, the Red Cross, Swedish organizations, and private companies.

From 1967 to 1973, Bratt served as ambassador in Dublin.

== Authorship and translations ==
Alongside his diplomatic career, Bratt was active as a writer and translator. During his time in Ethiopia, he published the poetry collection Arcadia Ethiopica, and, about Ireland, The Island Beyond the Island Country. In Tourist Country – Developing Country, he describes his time in Afghanistan and Iran. The cultural journals Horisont and Artes published several of his translations, including works by Nobel laureate Czesław Miłosz. He translated poems by the Russian poet Sergei Yesenin under the Swedish title Persiska dikter (Persian Poems).

He appeared on several occasions at the Slavo-Baltic Association in Lund, where he spoke about his impressions of the countries he had visited and about his translations. In Dublin, he became so well known and highly regarded that the United Arts Club Dublin invited him to give a lecture entitled "Joyce – the Scandinavian Connection," and The Irish Times described him as "a considerable scholar and linguist."

== Personal life ==
In 1939, Bratt married Carin Robbert (1915–1984), the daughter of the director Carl Johan Robbert and Ragnhild (née Boman). Bratt remarried in 1963 to Sonia Wyrill. Bratt had three children from his first marriage: Carl Johan Bratt (born 1940), Aimee Bratt (born 1943), and Carl Gustaf Bratt (born 1955).

After his retirement, Bratt settled in the Blackrock neighborhood of Dublin, Ireland.

== Death ==
Bratt died on 16 January 1987 in a car accident in Spain. The funeral took place on 5 February 1987 in Bromma Church, Stockholm. He was interred in the Friedländer Cemetery (Friedländerska kyrkogården) in Gothenburg, Sweden.

== Awards and decorations ==
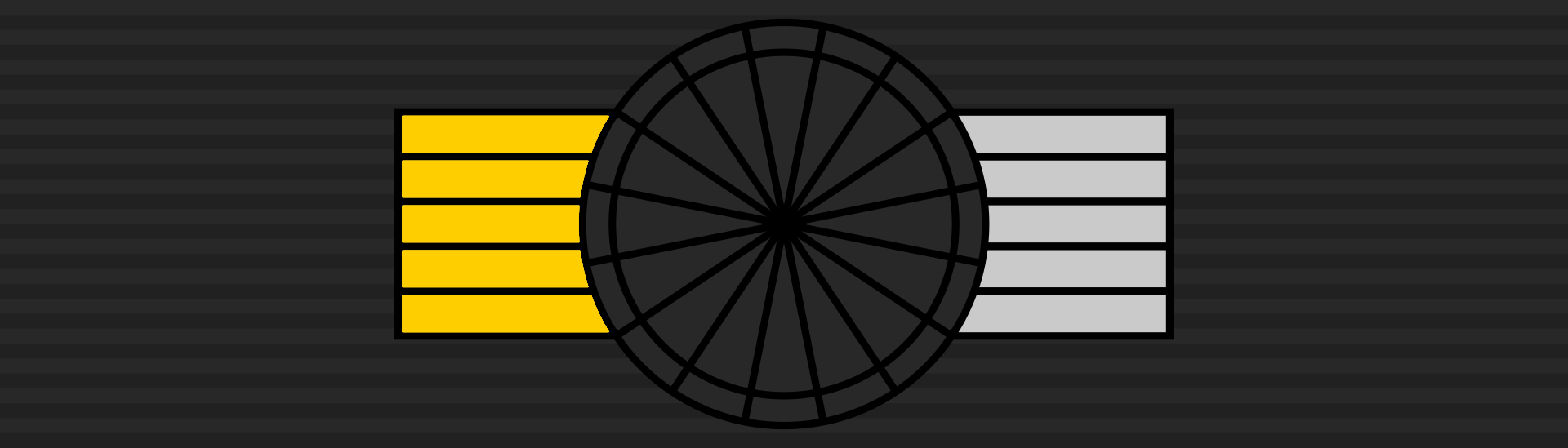
- (Sweden) Commander 1st Class of the Order of the Polar Star (11 November 1966)
- (Sweden) Commander of the Order of the Polar Star (28 November 1959)
- (Sweden) Knight of the Order of the Polar Star (1949)
- (Ethiopian Empire) Grand Cross of the Order of Menelik II
- (Denmark) Commander of the Order of the Dannebrog
- (Poland) Officer of the Order of Polonia Restituta
- Knight 1st Class of the Order of the White Rose of Finland
- (Latvia) Knight of the Order of the Three Stars

== Bibliography ==
- Bratt, Eyvind (1977). Ön bortom ö-landet [The Island Beyond the Island Country] (in Swedish). Göteborg: Zinderman. ISBN 9152802132. SELIBR 7412405.
- Bratt, Eyvind (1975). Det nordirländska problemet [The Northern Ireland problem]. Världspolitikens dagsfrågor, 0042-2754 ; 1975:5 (in Swedish). Stockholm: Utrikespolitiska institutet. ISBN 9171821961. SELIBR 7616472.
- Bratt, Eyvind (1970). Ireland's link with Swedish monarchy. Waterford: Old Waterford society. SELIBR 1762857.
- Jesenin, Sergej; Bratt, Eyvind (1970). Persiska dikter [Persian poems] (in Swedish). Karlstad: Karlstads Mekaniska Werkstad. SELIBR 1201185.
- Bratt, Eyvind (1967). Turistland - u-land: reseessayer från Främre Orienten [Tourist Country – Developing Country: travel essays from the Near East] (in Swedish). Stockholm: Geber. SELIBR 1683002.
- Bratt, Eyvind; Rosen, Björn von (1962). Arcadia Ethiopica. Bokvännens bibliotek, 0347-8386 ; 60 (in Swedish). Stockholm. SELIBR 1630248.
- Bratt, Eyvind (1951). Småstaterna i idéhistorien: en studie i äldre statsdoktriner [Small states in the history of ideas: a study in older state doctrines]. Skrifter utgivna av Statsvetenskapliga föreningen i Uppsala, 0346-7538 ; 31 (in Swedish). Uppsala: Almqvist & Wiksell [distributör]. SELIBR 8390029.
- Bratt, Eyvind (1948). Förenta Nationerna och atomvapnet [The United Nations and nuclear weapons]. Världspolitikens dagsfrågor, 0042-2754 ; 1948:5 (in Swedish). Stockholm: Utrikespolitiska institutet. SELIBR 804584.
- Bratt, Björn Axel Eyvind (1943). Diplomater och konsuler [Diplomats and consuls]. Värdspolitikens dagsfrågor. Utrikespolitiska institutets broschyrseries. 1942. Nr 8/9. 1943 (in Swedish). Stockholm. SELIBR 2577167.
- Bratt, Eyvind (1942). Diplomater och konsuler [Diplomats and consuls] (in Swedish). Stockholm: Utrikespolitiska institutet. SELIBR 8210195.
- Bratt, Eyvind (1929). Olof Bergklint: en nationspamp från frihetstiden [Olof Bergklint: a national hero from the Age of Liberty] (in Swedish). Uppsala. SELIBR 2577168.

Diplomatic posts
Preceded by Brynolf Eng	Consul general of Sweden in Berlin; 1951–1953	Succeeded by Hugo Tamm
Preceded by Erik Wisén	Envoy of Sweden to Ethiopia; 1953–1959	Succeeded by Åke Sjölin
Preceded by None	Envoy of Sweden to Sudan; 1957–1959	Succeeded by Åke Sjölin
Preceded by Alexis Aminoff	Envoy of Sweden to South Africa; 1959–1963	Succeeded by Hugo Tamm
Preceded by Dick Hichens-Bergström	Ambassador of Sweden to Iran; 1964–1967	Succeeded by Nils-Eric Ekblad
Preceded by Dick Hichens-Bergström	Ambassador of Sweden to Afghanistan; 1964–1967	Succeeded by Nils-Eric Ekblad
Preceded by Nils-Eric Ekblad	Ambassador of Sweden to Ireland; 1967–1973	Succeeded by Bo Järnstedt
