= Per Lind =

Swedish diplomat (1916–2012)

- Born: Per Erik Lind; 8 January 1916; Stockholm, Sweden
- Died: 30 November 2012 (aged 96); Stockholm, Sweden
- Education: Djursholms samskola Uppsala University
- Occupation: Diplomat
- Years active: 1939–1982
- Spouse: Eva Sandström (m. 1942; died 2005)
- Relatives: Christian Günther (uncle); Claës Günther (great-grandfather); Emil Sandström (father-in-law)

Per Erik Lind (8 January 1916 – 30 November 2012) was a Swedish diplomat who served in the Ministry for Foreign Affairs for more than four decades. After graduating with a law degree from Uppsala University in 1939, he joined the diplomatic service and held early postings in Helsinki, Stockholm, Berlin and Washington, D.C.

From 1953 to 1955, Lind served as personal assistant to UN Secretary-General Dag Hammarskjöld in New York City. The two developed a close friendship, which continued until Hammarskjöld's death in 1961. Lind subsequently played an important role in preserving and documenting Hammarskjöld's legacy.

Returning to Sweden, Lind held several senior positions within the Ministry for Foreign Affairs, including Head of the UN Bureau and Head of the Administrative Department. In 1962, he attained the rank of director-general for foreign affairs (utrikesråd). He later served as Ambassador to Canada (1965–1969), Australia (1975–1979), with additional accreditation to Papua New Guinea from 1977, and the United Kingdom (1979–1982). He retired from the diplomatic service on 1 October 1982.

== Early life ==
Lind was born on 8 January 1916 in Stockholm, Sweden, the son of Supreme Court Justice Erik Lind (1888–1959) and his wife, Anna Elisabeth "Lisa" Günther (1893–1987).. He had two siblings, Lars J. Lind and Suzanne Helweg. His maternal uncle was the diplomat Christian Günther (1886–1966), who served as Sweden's minister for foreign affairs throughout the Second World War, from 1939 to 1945. His maternal grandfather was the civil servant Ernst Günther (1850–1927), who became Sweden's first minister to Norway following the dissolution of the union between the two countries. His maternal great-grandfather was the lawyer and politician Claës Günther (1799–1861), who served as minister for justice from 1856 to 1858.

Lind grew up in Djursholm, where his early years were marked by an active outdoor lifestyle. He took part in various sports, including handball and football. His paternal grandmother fostered his interest in literature. The family library also contained works by P. G. Wodehouse, including Piccadilly Jim, which had greatly amused his father. Later in life, Lind became a member of the Swedish Wodehouse Society.

On 17 May 1934, Lind graduated from the Latin programme at Djursholms samskola. He went on to study law at Uppsala University, where he graduated with a Candidate of Law degree in 1939.

== Career ==
Lind joined the Swedish Ministry for Foreign Affairs as an attaché in 1939. His early diplomatic postings included Helsinki in 1939, the ministry in Stockholm in 1941, and Berlin in 1942. Along with the other members of the Swedish legation, Lind continued his work from a bunker in Berlin's Tiergarten district. On 22 November 1943, the Swedish legation was destroyed in the largest bombing raid on Berlin to that date. The couple's home was also reduced to rubble, along with all their household possessions. Lind returned to Sweden shortly before the end of the war.

In 1946, Lind became a second secretary at the Ministry for Foreign Affairs, having served in an acting capacity since 1944. He was appointed second legation secretary in Washington, D.C., in 1947 and promoted to first legation secretary there in 1948. In 1951, he became a first secretary at the ministry, where he was assigned to the department dealing with Council of Europe affairs. It was there that he worked under and became acquainted with Dag Hammarskjöld. When Hammarskjöld was elected Secretary-General of the United Nations in 1953, he invited Lind to accompany him to New York City as his personal assistant. Lind served in this capacity during the first years of Hammarskjöld's tenure, working within the United Nations Secretariat until 1955, when he returned to Sweden to resume his duties at the ministry.

Lind maintained close contact with Hammarskjöld until the latter's death in 1961. The two men had become close friends, and Hammarskjöld entrusted Lind with reviewing his personal papers after his death. For many years, Lind also served as an important source of information for researchers studying Hammarskjöld and his work. As late as 2005, he contributed, together with Bengt Thelin, to a chapter in the official Swedish commemorative volume on Hammarskjöld, Freden som äventyr. Lind also inaugurated a memorial exhibition at the National Library of Sweden. The esteem in which he was held by his former colleagues at the United Nations was reflected in a message sent to his funeral by former UN Deputy Secretary-General Sir Brian Urquhart: "Per was a marvellous and unique person and he will be sorely missed by the many people who relied on his diffident but excellent advice."

In 1956, Lind was appointed head of the Ministry's Third Bureau, commonly known as the UN Bureau. From 1959 to 1963, he served as deputy head of its Political Department. In 1962, he attained the rank of director-general (utrikesråd). He subsequently served as an ambassador attached to the ministry's negotiating delegation from 1964 to 1965, before being appointed ambassador to Canada in 1965, a position he held until 1969.

During his posting to Canada, Lind undertook several initiatives to promote Sweden and Swedish industry abroad. Among them was the two-week "Meet Modern Sweden" campaign, led by Prince Bertil, Duke of Halland, which visited approximately fifteen Canadian cities to showcase Swedish industry and the country's economy. Lind also visited Expo 67 in Montreal and, in May of that year, attended the Swedish pavilion at the British Columbia International Trade Fair (BCITF) in Vancouver.

From 1969 to 1975, Lind served as head of the Administrative Department at the Ministry for Foreign Affairs. In 1974, during the 29th session of the United Nations General Assembly, he chaired the Special Political Committee.

In 1975, Lind was appointed ambassador to Australia, based in Canberra. From 1977, his diplomatic responsibilities also included accreditation to Port Moresby, Papua New Guinea. He remained in Canberra until 1979, when he was appointed ambassador to the United Kingdom, a position he held until 1982. On 29 July 1982, Lind and his wife were received in a farewell audience by Queen Elizabeth II at Buckingham Palace, marking the end of his appointment as ambassador extraordinary and plenipotentiary of Sweden to the Court of St James's. He formally left the post and retired from the diplomatic service on 1 October 1982.

== Personal life ==
On 20 June 1942, Lind married Eva Sandström (1920–2005) at Engelbrekt Church in the Östermalm district of Stockholm. She was the daughter of Supreme Court Justice Emil Sandström and his wife, Anna (née Åkerman). The couple had four children: Johan (born 1943), Agneta (born 1944), Birgitta (born 1949), and Tomas (born 1959).

Eva was born in Egypt, where her father served as a member of the Mixed Courts of Egypt. When she was six years old, the family moved to London following his appointment to the Anglo-German Mixed Arbitral Tribunal. They returned to Sweden in 1929. Eva subsequently joined the Ministry for Foreign Affairs, where she met her future husband, Per Lind. During the periods when the family lived in Sweden and Lind was working at the ministry, Eva was employed by the Swedish Red Cross, continuing a family tradition. Her father had served as chairman of the organisation during the 1950s.

Lind was also a member of the Swedish Wodehouse Society, whose aim is to promote public awareness of the author P. G. Wodehouse and his literary works.

== Death ==
Lind died in Stockholm on 30 November 2012. He was interred in the memorial garden at Djursholm Cemetery on 29 May 2013.

== Awards and decorations ==
=== Swedish ===
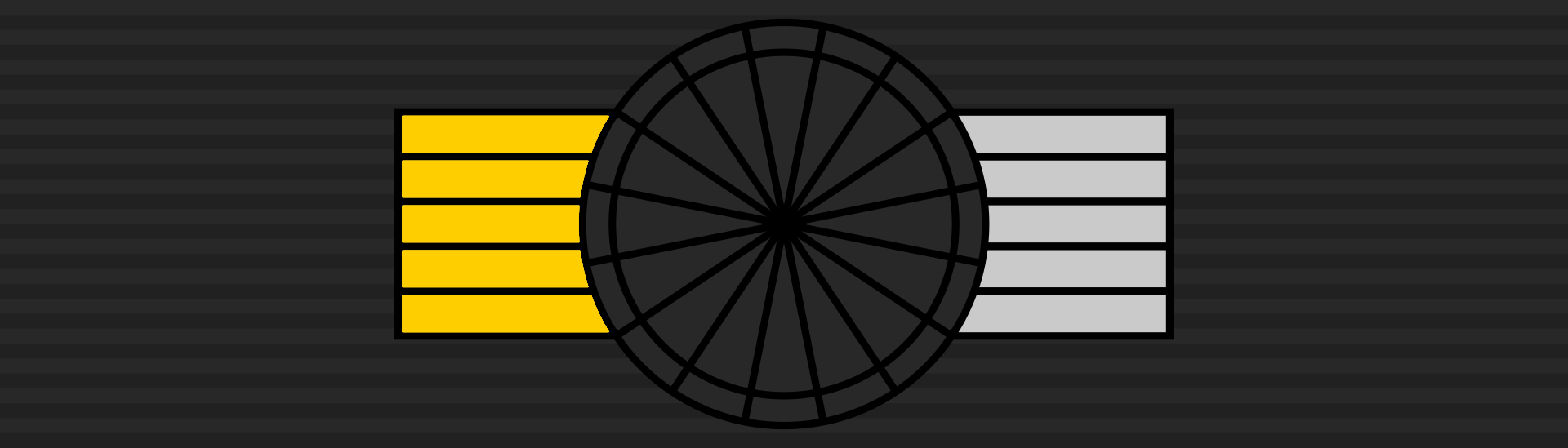
- (Sweden) Commander 1st Class of the Order of the Polar Star (6 June 1973)
- (Sweden) Commander of the Order of the Polar Star (11 November 1966)
- (Sweden) Knight of the Order of the Polar Star (1959)

=== Foreign ===
- Commander of the Decoration of Honour for Services to the Republic of Austria
- (Pahlavi Iran) Grand Officer of the Order of the Crown
- (Iceland) Grand Knight's Cross with Star of the Order of the Falcon (15 December 1960)
- (Netherlands) Commander of the Order of Orange-Nassau (18 May 1957)
- (Netherlands) Knight of the Order of Orange-Nassau (14 March 1946)
- (Norway) Knight of the Order of St. Olav
- Knight of the Order of the White Rose of Finland
- Officer of the Order of Merit of the Kingdom of Hungary

Diplomatic posts
Preceded by Ragnvald Bagge	Ambassador of Sweden to Canada; 1965–1969	Succeeded by Åke Malmaeus
Preceded by Per Anger	Ambassador of Sweden to Australia; 1975–1979	Succeeded by Lars Hedström
Preceded by None	Ambassador of Sweden to Papua New Guinea; 1977–1979	Succeeded by Lars Hedström
Preceded by Olof Rydbeck	Ambassador of Sweden to the United Kingdom; 1979–1982	Succeeded by Leif Leifland
