= Gunnar Fant =

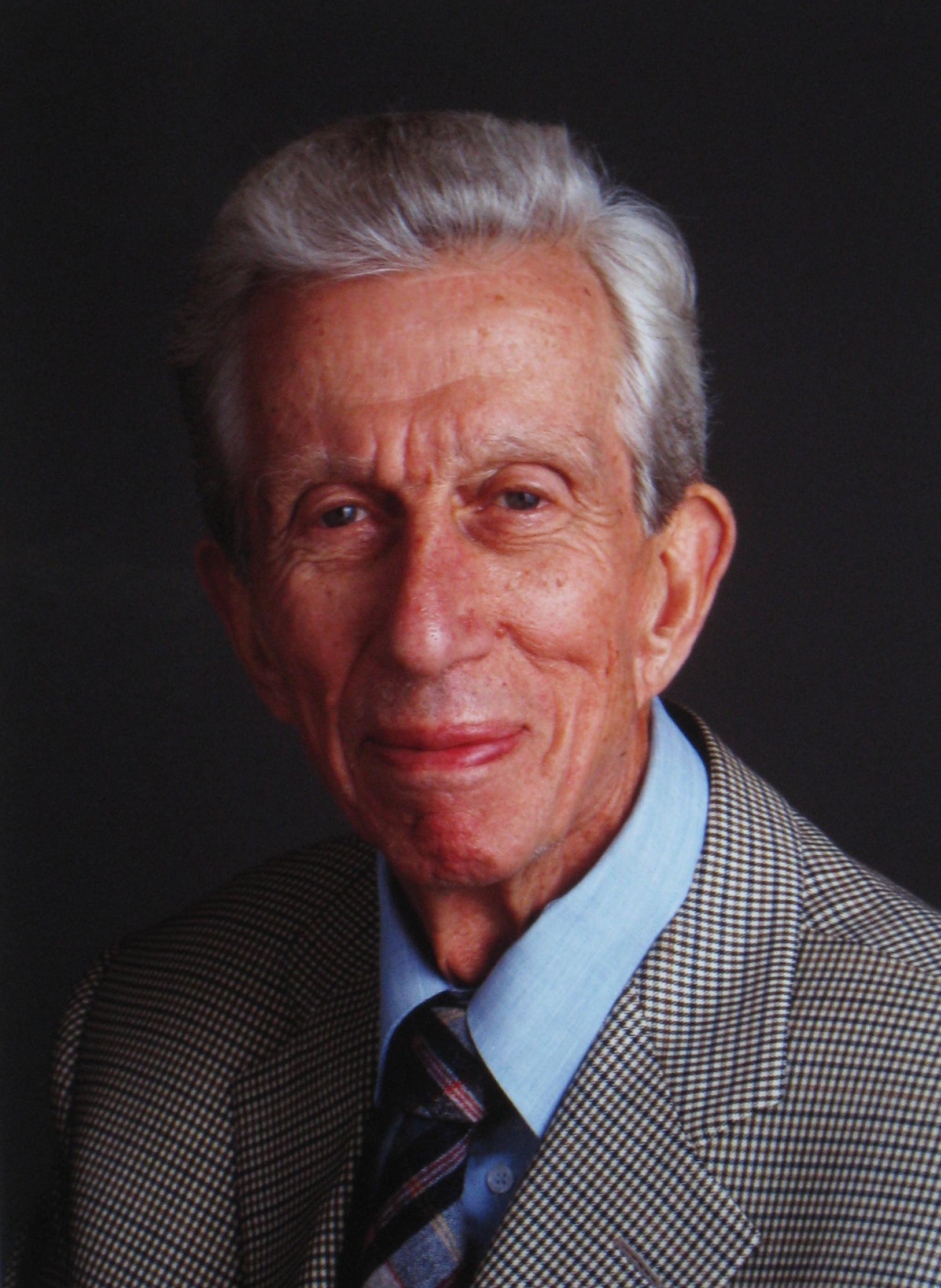
- Gunnar Fant in 1999
- Born: Carl Gunnar Michael Fant; 8 October 1919; Nyköping, Sweden
- Died: 6 June 2009 (aged 89)
- Years active: 1945–1987
- Spouse: Ann Marie Lindahl (m. 1952; died 1971)
- Relatives: George Fant (cousin); Kenne Fant (cousin); Gösta af Petersens (brother-in-law)

Academic background
- Education: KTH Royal Institute of Technology; Harvard University; Massachusetts Institute of Technology

Academic work
- Notable works: Source–filter model, Orator Verbis Electris (OVE)

Carl Gunnar Michael Fant (8 October 1919 – 6 June 2009) was a leading researcher in speech science in general and speech synthesis in particular who spent most of his career as a professor at the Swedish Royal Institute of Technology (KTH) in Stockholm.

== Early life ==
Fant was born on 8 October 1919 in Nyköping, Sweden, the son of Mayor Gunnar Fant (1879–1967) and his wife Märta (née Norström). He was a first cousin of the actors and directors George Fant and Kenne Fant.

Fant received a Master of Science in electrical Engineering from KTH Royal Institute of Technology in 1945.

== Career ==
Fant specialized in the acoustics of the human voice, measuring formant values, and continued to work in this area at Ericsson and at the Massachusetts Institute of Technology. He also took the initiative of creating a speech communication department at KTH, unusual at the time.

Fant's work led to the birth of a new era of speech synthesis with the introduction of powerful and configurable formant synthesizers. In 1960, he published the source–filter model of speech production, which became widely used. In the 1960s, Gunnar Fant's Orator Verbis Electris (OVE) competed with Walter Lawrence's Parametric Artificial Talker (PAT) in creating lifelike speech synthesis.

In later years, Gunnar Fant remained active in the area of speech synthesis, focusing mainly on research on prosody.

Fant received honorary doctorates from the Grenoble University (1978) and from Stockholm University (1988), and several other awards. In 1989, he was the inaugural recipient Scientific Achievement Medal of the International Speech Communication Association. He also received the Swedish Academy Margit Påhlson award, and the IEEE James L. Flanagan Speech and Audio Processing Award (2003). He was a member of the Royal Swedish Academy of Sciences and the Royal Swedish Academy of Engineering Sciences.

== Personal life ==
In 1952, Fant married Ann Marie Lindahl (1918–1971), the daughgter of lawyer Alf Lindahl and Margareta (née Langenskiöld).

== Bibliography ==
- Gunnar Fant (1960) Acoustic Theory of Speech Production. Mouton De Gruyter. ISBN 90-279-1600-4
- Gunnar Fant (2006) Speech Acoustics and Phonetics: Selected Writings. Springer. ISBN 1-4020-2789-3
- Roman Jakobson, C. Gunnar M. Fant, and Morris Halle (1961) Preliminaries to Speech Analysis: The Distinctive Features and Their Correlates. Cambridge, MA: The MIT Press. ISBN 0-262-60001-3

== Sources ==
- Dennis H. Klatt (1987). "Review of text-to-speech conversion for English". The Journal of the Acoustical Society of America, vol. 82, no. 3, September 1987, pp. 737–793.
