= Gösta af Petersens =

Swedish diplomat (1910–1969)

- Born: Gösta Ludvig Sebastian af Petersens; 12 December 1910; Stockholm, Sweden
- Died: 15 August 1969 (aged 58); Stockholm, Sweden
- Resting place: Uppsala Old Cemetery
- Education: Lundsbergs boarding school Uppsala University
- Occupation: Diplomat
- Years active: 1936–1969
- Spouse: Gunilla Fant (m. 1939)
- Children: 2
- Relatives: Gunnar Dryselius (brother-in-law); Gunnar Fant (brother-in-law)

Gösta Ludvig Sebastian af Petersens (12 December 1910 – 15 August 1969) was a Swedish diplomat who served in numerous diplomatic postings across Europe and the Americas before becoming Sweden's first ambassador to Australia in 1963. He joined the Swedish Ministry for Foreign Affairs in 1936 and held positions in Chicago, Minneapolis, Washington, D.C., Hamburg, London, Liverpool, Berlin and Buenos Aires. From 1956 to 1963, he served as consul general in Minneapolis, representing Sweden in five American states. During this period, he actively promoted Swedish-American relations through cultural exhibitions, royal visits and diplomatic events.

Appointed envoy to Canberra in June 1963, he became ambassador following the elevation of the Swedish and Australian diplomatic missions to embassy status later that year. During his tenure, he fostered Swedish-Australian cultural and commercial relations, including through visits by Swedish royal and business delegations. He died of a heart attack in Stockholm on 15 August 1969, while on holiday.

== Early life ==
Gösta was born on 12 December 1910 in Stockholm, Sweden, into the noble af Petersens family. His parents were the forester Gustav af Petersens (born 1878) and Baroness Märta Emilia Johanna Rappe (1883–1969).

His paternal grandfather was Gustaf af Petersens (1842–1933), a deputy district judge, industrialist and member of the First Chamber of the Swedish Parliament. His great-great-great-great-grandfather was Herman Petersen, a merchant and director of the Swedish East India Company. On his mother's side, his grandfather was Baron Ludvig Rappe (1847–1906), a colonel, while his great-grandfather was Baron Axel Rappe (1800–1875), a chamberlain and county governor. His maternal uncles included Gerhard Rappe (1894–1974), an agronomist and agricultural researcher, and Adolf Rappe (1895–1954), a physician.

Gösta had three younger sisters and one younger brother. Among his siblings was the artist Anna Dryselius (1912–1991), making him the brother-in-law of diplomat Gunnar Dryselius (1907–1982).

He graduated from Lundsbergs boarding school in 1930 and went on to earn a Candidate of Laws degree from Uppsala University in 1936.

== Career ==
af Petersens joined the Swedish Ministry for Foreign Affairs in 1936 as an attaché. His subsequent diplomatic appointments included postings in Chicago (1937), Minneapolis (1938), where he served as acting vice-consul, Washington, D.C. (1939), and Hamburg (1940). He returned to the Ministry in Stockholm in 1940 and was appointed second secretary in 1944, having served in an acting capacity since 1941. He subsequently served as vice-consul in London (1944), first vice-consul in Liverpool (1946), and in Berlin (1947). In 1951, he became first secretary at the ministry and a board member of the Swedish Institute for Cultural Relations with Foreign Countries (Svenska institutet för kulturellt utbyte med utlandet) and the American-Swedish News Exchange, positions he held until 1953. That year, he was appointed first legation secretary in Buenos Aires. In 1956, he became consul, with the rank and status of a consul general, in Minneapolis.

He arrived in Minneapolis on 29 September 1956. From there, he represented Sweden in Minnesota, North Dakota, South Dakota, Montana and Wisconsin. The consulate's principal responsibility was handling inheritance and estate matters, which accounted for the largest part of its workload. af Petersens was assisted in this work by four staff members.

In May 1958, af Petersens played a prominent role in the celebrations marking the centennial of Minnesota's statehood. Together with his wife, he welcomed the Swedish royal delegation, headed by Prince Bertil, Duke of Halland, during its official visit to the Twin Cities from 8 to 11 May. On 9 May, the couple hosted a reception for Prince Bertil and the Swedish delegation at the Swedish Consulate General, where they also inaugurated a special exhibition of Swedish glass. af Petersens was also a member of the organizing committee for the official dinner held in Prince Bertil's honour at the Hotel Radisson on 10 May. The dinner was one of the highlights of Sweden's participation in the centennial celebrations.

In April 1961, af Petersens helped organize a major exhibition of Swedish art and design at the Tweed Art Gallery in Duluth, Minnesota. Working alongside Orazio Fumagalli and Gunnar Lonaeus, he helped present 194 works encompassing Swedish glass, crystal, textiles and ceramics. The exhibition featured works by prominent designers including Wilhelm Kåge, Carl-Harry Stålhane and Stig Lindberg. More than 1,000 people attended the opening, which was also attended by Swedish Prime Minister Tage Erlander, his wife Aina Erlander and Swedish Ambassador Gunnar Jarring. Erlander officially opened the exhibition together with Provost Raymond W. Darland.

On 11 November 1962, marking the 80th birthday of King Gustaf VI Adolf, af Petersens and his wife hosted a gathering at which the celebrated dramatic soprano Birgit Nilsson was the guest of honour.

In June 1963, af Petersens was appointed envoy to Canberra. In November that year, an agreement was reached to elevate both the Swedish Legation in Canberra and the Australian Legation in Stockholm to embassy status. In connection with this change, af Petersens was appointed Sweden's ambassador to Australia. In December 1963, he attended the inauguration of LM Ericsson's first telephone factory in Australia, located in Broadmeadows near Melbourne. In May 1965, he welcomed Prince Bertil and a Swedish business delegation to Canberra. In January 1967, af Petersens was aboard the Swedish minelayer HSwMS Älvsnabben during its voyage to Sydney. The vessel was then undertaking a round-the-world expedition, with Crown Prince Carl Gustaf among those on board. Upon its arrival in Sydney, the new premises of the Swedish Chamber of Commerce were officially inaugurated.

== Personal life ==
On 3 December 1939, in Washington, D.C., af Petersens married Gunilla Fant (1917–1977), daughter of Mayor Gunnar Fant and Märta Norström. They had two children: Ulla (born 1940) and Fabian af Petersens (born 1944), a photographer, journalist and author. Ulla later married Brian Parker, a solicitor in Sydney.

His wife, Gunilla, was the sister of lawyer and business executive Fred Fant (1907–1999) and Professor Gunnar Fant (1919–2009), as well as the half-sister of actor Michael Fant (1928–1967).

Fishing was af Petersens' favourite sport. As for hobbies, he once remarked: "I don't have any real hobbies to occupy my spare time. My only hobby is work."

== Death ==
af Petersens died of a heart attack on 15 August 1969 in Stockholm, while on holiday. He had been on leave since late July and was due to return to Canberra in November. A memorial service was held on 21 August at St Peter's Memorial Lutheran Church in Canberra.

His funeral service took place on 27 August 1969 in the Chapel of the Holy Cross at Skogskrematoriet, followed by a reception at the House of Nobility. His remains were interred on 16 September 1969 at Uppsala Old Cemetery in Uppsala.

== Awards and decorations ==
- (Sweden) Knight of the Order of the Polar Star (1959)
- (Argentina) Commander of the Order of the Liberator General San Martín

Diplomatic posts
Preceded by Carl Fredrik Hellström	Consul General of Sweden to Minneapolis; 1956–1963	Succeeded by Olof Landenius
Preceded by Nils-Eric Ekblad	Envoy/Ambassador of Sweden to Australia; 1963–1969	Succeeded by Per Anger
