= Nils-Eric Ekblad =

Swedish diplomat

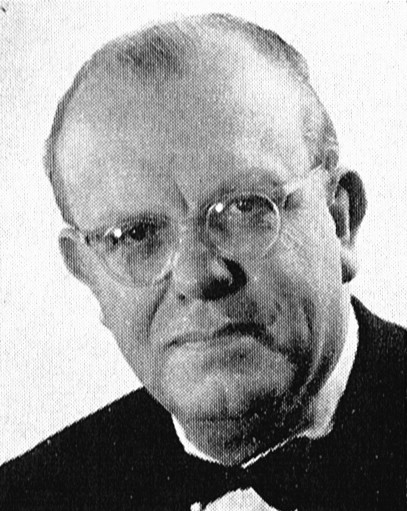
- Born: Nils-Eric Gustaf Ekblad; 12 November 1904; Lund, Sweden
- Died: 25 August 1978 (aged 73); Portimão, Portugal
- Education: Lund University
- Occupation: Diplomat
- Years active: 1928–1970
- Spouse: Märta Granström (m. 1932; died 1976)
- Children: 2

Nils-Eric Gustaf Ekblad (12 November 1904 – 25 August 1978) was a Swedish diplomat. Ekblad began his diplomatic career in 1928 when he joined the Swedish Ministry for Foreign Affairs as an attaché. Over the following decades, he served in various posts around the world, including Chicago (1929), Riga, Tallinn, and Kaunas (1931), Bern (1934), Omaha (1935), and Copenhagen (1937–1939), where he rose to first legation secretary.

During World War II, Ekblad was head of a department and later director at the Swedish National Board of Information, where he led secret counter-propaganda efforts. His strong contacts in Copenhagen were crucial in alerting Sweden to the Nazi plan to purge Danish Jews in 1943, triggering a Swedish-initiated rescue operation.

Post-war, Ekblad served as counsellor and chargé d'affaires in Caracas (1943–1948) and Addis Ababa (1948–1950). After a period at the Foreign Ministry, he became consul and then consul general in Hamburg (1952–1960). He later served as ambassador to Australia (1960–1963), Ireland (1963–1967), and Iran (1967–1970), with dual accreditation to Afghanistan.

== Early life ==
Ekblad was born on 12 November 1904 in Lund, Sweden, the son of Erik Ekblad, a headmaster, and his wife Gustava (née Jönsson). Ekblad was something of an academic prodigy, graduating from secondary school at the age of 15 in 1920, and earning a Bachelor of Arts degree from Lund University at 17 in 1922. He became a reserve officer in 1924 and obtained a Candidate of Law degree in 1928 before joining the Ministry for Foreign Affairs in Stockholm as an attaché that same year.

== Career ==
He served in Chicago in 1929, was acting second secretary of legation in Riga, Tallinn and Kaunas 1931, attaché in Bern in 1934, and vice consul in Omaha in 1935. Ekblad was then vice consul and trade attaché in Copenhagen in 1937, first vice consul in 1938 and became first secretary of legation in 1939. In 1939 he received the rank of captain and became head of the department at the Swedish National Board of Information (Statens Informationsstyrelse) and then director (byråchef) in 1941. According to his own statement, he was head of the secret "coordination office for counter-propaganda". On the occasion of his 60th birthday, Gunnar Unger recalled Ekblad’s contributions at the Swedish National Board of Information during World War II. Thanks to his strong contacts in Copenhagen, Ekblad was the first to learn that the Nazis were planning a purge of the Danish Jews in the autumn of 1943. This enabled him to send the signal that triggered the rescue operation for the persecuted, which was immediately initiated from the Swedish side.

Under the pseudonym of 'Spectator', he and Gunnar Unger published the brochure Svenskarna och propagandan: har Gallup rätt? ("The Swedes and the propaganda: is Gallup right?") (1943). Eblad was the chairman of the National Information Board's Advertising Council from 1940 to 1943, its Film Council from 1942 to 1943, deputy chairman of the Stockholm Advertising Association from 1942 to 1943, and board member of the Swedish Advertising Association from 1942 to 1943.

Ekblad was appointed counsellor and chargé d'affaires en pied in Caracas from 1943, serving until 1948, then in Addis Ababa from 1948 to 1950 before he was back and served at the Foreign Ministry from 1950 to 1952. Ekblad became consul in Hamburg in 1952 and was consul general there from 1954 to 1960 before he was ambassador in Canberra from 1960 to 1963, in Dublin from 1963 to 1967, and in Tehran from 1967 to 1970 with dual accreditation to Kabul.

== Personal life ==
In 1931 he married the dentist Märta Granström (1905–1976), daughter of the wholesaler Carl Granström and Cecilia Frykblom. He was the father of Marie-Louise (born 1933) and Ulla-Mae (born 1937).

Ekblad was a resident of Portimão, Portugal.

== Death ==
Ekblad died on 25 August 1978. The funeral took place in Lund Cathedral on 1 September 1978. On 10 May 1979, he was interred at the Northern Cemetery in Lund.

== Awards and decorations ==
=== Swedish ===
- (Sweden) Commander 1st Class of Order of the Polar Star (6 June 1967)
- (Sweden) Commander of Order of the Polar Star (6 June 1959)
- (Sweden) Knight of Order of the Polar Star (1947)
- (Sweden) Knight 1st Class of Order of Vasa (1941)

=== Foreign ===
- (Venezuela) Grand Officer of the Order of the Liberator
- (Denmark) Commander of the Order of the Dannebrog
- (Latvia) Commander of the Order of the Three Stars
- (Estonia) Third Class of the Order of the White Star
- Knight 1st Class of the Order of the White Rose of Finland
- (Lithuania) Officer of the Order of the Lithuanian Grand Duke Gediminas
- (Netherlands) Officer of the Order of Orange-Nassau
- (Norway) Knight of the Order of St. Olav
- (West Germany) Grand Cross of the Order of Merit of the Federal Republic of Germany
- (Denmark) King Christian X's Liberty Medal
- (Sweden) Commemorative Medal on the occasion of the second Lingiad (Minnesmedalj med anledning av andra Lingiaden) (1949)
- (Sweden) Southern Journalist Association's badge of merit in gold (Södra journalistförbundets förtjänsttecken i guld)

Diplomatic posts
Preceded by Widar Bagge as Envoy	Chargé d'affaires of Sweden to Ethiopia; 1948–1950	Succeeded by Erik Wisén as Envoy
Preceded by Himself as Consul	Consul general of Sweden in Hamburg; 1954–1960	Succeeded by Erland Kleen
Preceded by Carl Bergenstråhle	Envoy of Sweden to Australia; 1960–1963	Succeeded by Gösta af Petersens
Preceded by Leif Öhrvall	Envoy of Sweden to Ireland; 1963–1967	Succeeded by Eyvind Bratt
Preceded by Eyvind Bratt	Ambassador of Sweden to Iran; 1967–1970	Succeeded by Gustaf Bonde
Preceded by Eyvind Bratt	Ambassador of Sweden to Afghanistan; 1967–1970	Succeeded by Gustaf Bonde
