= Leif Leifland =

Swedish diplomat

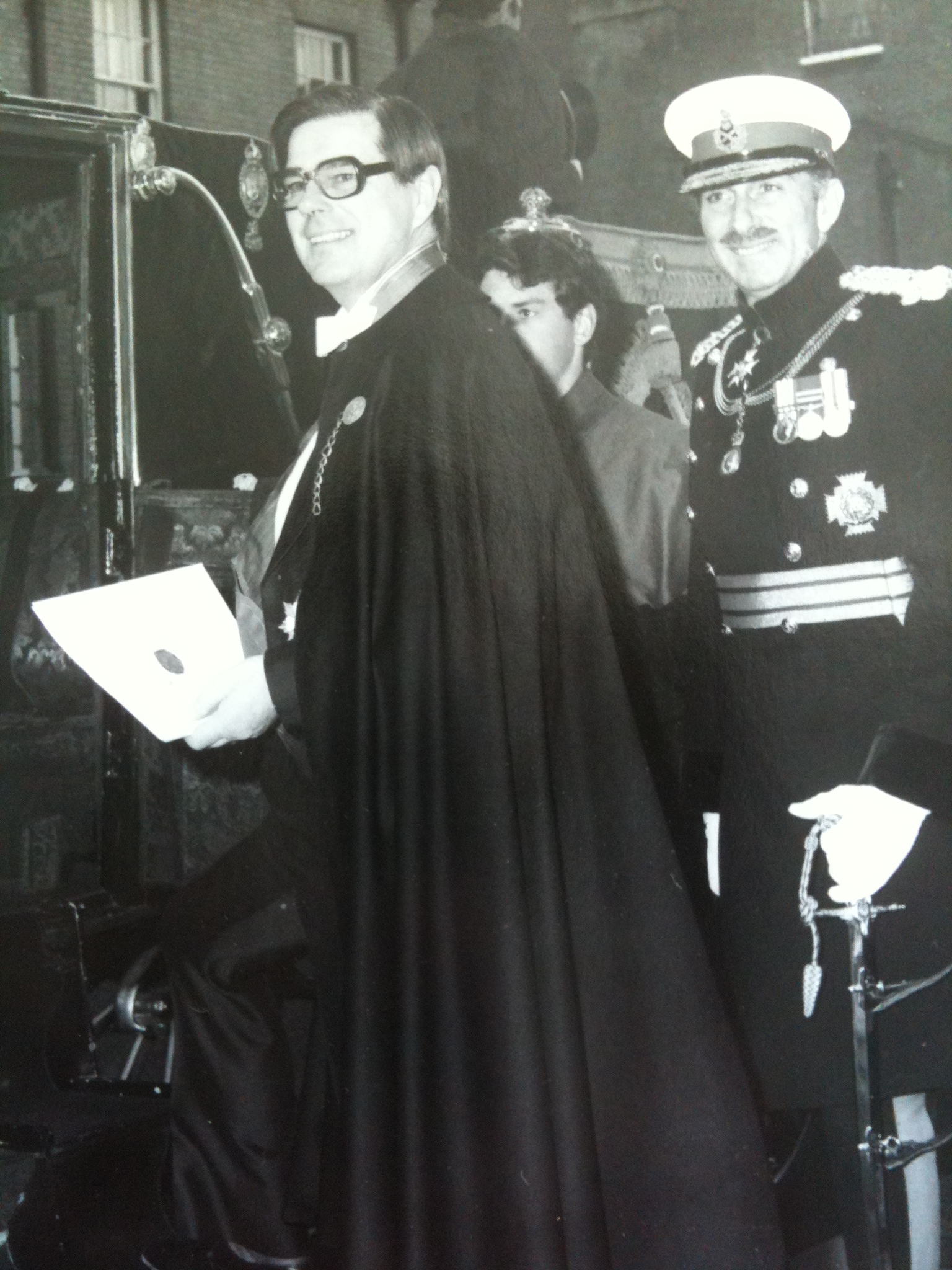
- Leifland as ambassador in London in 1982.

Ambassador of Sweden to the United Kingdom
- In office 1982–1991
- Preceded by: Per Lind
- Succeeded by: Lennart Eckerberg

State Secretary for Foreign Affairs
- In office 1 June 1977 – 1982
- Prime Minister: Thorbjörn Fälldin; Ola Ullsten
- Preceded by: Sverker Åström
- Succeeded by: Pierre Schori

Personal details
- Born: 30 December 1925 Stockholm, Sweden
- Died: 3 April 2015 (aged 89) Stockholm, Sweden
- Resting place: Norra begravningsplatsen
- Spouse: Karin Abard (m. 1954; died 1999)
- Children: 3
- Education: Lund University

Leif Leifland (30 December 1925 – 3 April 2015) was a Swedish diplomat who served as state secretary for foreign affairs from 1977 to 1982 and as ambassador of Sweden to the United Kingdom from 1982 to 1991. Leifland joined the Ministry for Foreign Affairs in 1951 and began his diplomatic career in 1952 as an attaché in Casablanca. He went on to serve in various roles, including attaché in Athens, Bonn, and as second secretary in Stockholm, and worked as assistant secretary of the Committee on Foreign Affairs from 1958 to 1970.

He was appointed minister at the Swedish Embassy in Washington, D.C. in 1970, where he navigated a challenging period of strained relations between Sweden and the U.S. due to the Vietnam War and Prime Minister Olof Palme's criticism of U.S. bombing campaigns. Returning to Sweden in 1974, he became head of the Political Department at the Ministry for Foreign Affairs, later serving as state secretary for foreign affairs. He managed several crises, including the Soviet submarine incident in 1981. In 1982, he was appointed ambassador to London, where he served until his retirement in 1991. After retiring, he chaired the Swedish Institute of International Affairs and the Swedish Foundation for International Cooperation in Research and Higher Education.

== Early life ==
Leifland was born on 30 December 1925 in Stockholm, Sweden, the son Sigfrid Leifland, an accountant, and his wife Elna (née Jonasson). He spent his childhood in Jönköping, where his father was an accountant. Leifland received a Candidate of Law degree from Lund University in 1950.

== Career ==
Leifland joined the Ministry for Foreign Affairs in 1951 and began his diplomatic career as an attaché in Casablanca in 1952. He subsequently served as an attaché in Athens (1953–1955), Bonn (1955–1958), and as second secretary in Stockholm in 1958. From 1958 to 1960, he worked as secretary for the inquiry on Swedish citizenship as a prerequisite for public service and as assistant secretary of the Committee on Foreign Affairs. He later served as the committee's principal secretary from 1966 to 1970. During 1958–1960, he also served as assistant secretary at the Nordic Council and as first embassy secretary in Washington, D.C., from 1961 to 1964. In 1965, he became a desk officer (departementssekreterare) at the Ministry for Foreign Affairs and was appointed Minister at the Swedish Embassy in Washington in 1970.

Leifland's role as Minister in Washington became particularly challenging during his tenure. Sweden's position on the Vietnam War and Prime Minister Olof Palme's sharp criticism of the so-called Christmas bombings in 1972 triggered an 18-month freeze in diplomatic relations between the United States and Sweden. The newly appointed Swedish ambassador, Social Democrat Yngve Möller, was declared unwelcome in the U.S. capital. For the next year and a half, Leifland led the embassy amidst an extremely strained Swedish-American diplomatic climate. He later documented this period in his book Frostens år ("The Years of Frost"), published in 1997. Between 1973 and 1974, he served as chargé d'affaires ad interim in Washington.

Upon returning to Sweden in 1974, he was appointed by Olof Palme as director (utrikesråd) and head of the Political Department at the Ministry for Foreign Affairs. He served as secretary of the Advisory Council on Foreign Affairs from 1975 to 1977 and as state secretary for foreign affairs in 1977. As state secretary, he worked under three foreign ministers: Karin Söder, Hans Blix, and Ola Ullsten, managing crises such as the Soviet submarine S-363, which ran aground in the Blekinge archipelago in October 1981. Leifland considered himself an apolitical state secretary, although he never made a secret of voting for the Liberal People's Party. After the 1982 Swedish general election, in which the Social Democrats regained power, he ended his service. The Social Democrats appointed their own candidate, Pierre Schori.

Leifland became ambassador to London in 1982 and remained in the position until his retirement in 1991. After retiring, he served as chairman of the Swedish Institute of International Affairs from 1991 to 1999. He was also chairman of the Swedish Foundation for International Cooperation in Research and Higher Education (Stiftelsen för internationalisering av högre utbildning och forskning, STINT).

== Personal life ==
In 1954, Leifland married to Karin Abard (1930–1999), the daughter of director Gustaf Abard and Ingrid Nordin. They had three children: Karl (1955–2018), Christina (born 1957), and Eva (born 1960).

== Death ==
Leifland died on 3 April 2015 in Hedvig Eleonora Parish, Stockholm. The funeral service was held on 23 April 2015 at Hedvig Eleonora Church in Stockholm. He was interred on 21 March 2016 at Norra begravningsplatsen in Solna.

== Awards and decorations ==
- (United Kingdom) Honorary Knight Grand Cross of the Royal Victorian Order
- (Iceland) Grand Cross of the Order of the Falcon (26 October 1981)
- (Iceland) Grand Knight's Cross with Star of the Order of the Falcon (10 June 1975)
- (Norway) Commander with Star of the Order of St. Olav (1975)
- (Norway) Knight of the Order of St. Olav (1954)
- (West Germany) Knight of the Order of Merit of the Federal Republic of Germany

== Honours ==
- Member of the Royal Swedish Academy of War Sciences (1982)
- Member of the Royal Swedish Society of Naval Sciences (1982)

== Bibliography ==
- Artéus, Gunnar; Leifland, Leif, eds. (2001). Svenska diplomatprofiler under 1900-talet [Swedish diplomat profiles during the 20th century] (in Swedish). Stockholm: Probus. ISBN 9187184583. SELIBR 3396704.
- Leifland, Leif (1997). Frostens år: om USA:s diplomatiska utfrysning av Sverige [The year of the frost: about the USA's diplomatic ostracism of Sweden]. Sverige under kalla kriget, 99-2240566-0 ; 2 (in Swedish). Stockholm: Nerenius & Santérus. ISBN 9164801098. SELIBR 7460819.
- Leifland, Leif (1992). General Böhmes val: Sverige och det nazistiska Tyskland våren 1945 [General Böhme's choice: Sweden and Nazi Germany in the spring of 1945] (in Swedish). Stockholm: Norstedt. ISBN 9119192428. SELIBR 7156035.
- Leifland, Leif (1989). Svartlistningen av Axel Wenner-Gren: en bok om ett justitiemord [The blacklisting of Axel Wenner-Gren: a book about a miscarriage of justice] (in Swedish). Stockholm: Askelin & Hägglund. ISBN 9176841588. SELIBR 7657852.
- Leifland, Leif (1984). Det ekonomiska och handelspolitiska läget i Storbritannien: anförande vid Sveriges Allmänna Exportförenings årsmöte den 18 oktober 1984 [The economic and trade policy situation in United Britain: speech at the Swedish General Export Association's annual meeting on 18 October 1984] (in Swedish). Stockholm: Sveriges allmänna exportförening. SELIBR 2378504.

Diplomatic posts
| Preceded by Sverker Åström | State Secretary for Foreign Affairs; 1977–1982 | Succeeded by Pierre Schori |
| Preceded by Per Lind | Ambassador of Sweden to the United Kingdom; 1982–1991 | Succeeded by Lennart Eckerberg |
