= List of ambassadors of Sweden to Papua New Guinea =

Ambassador of Sweden to Papua New Guinea
- Lesser coat of arms of the Kingdom of Sweden

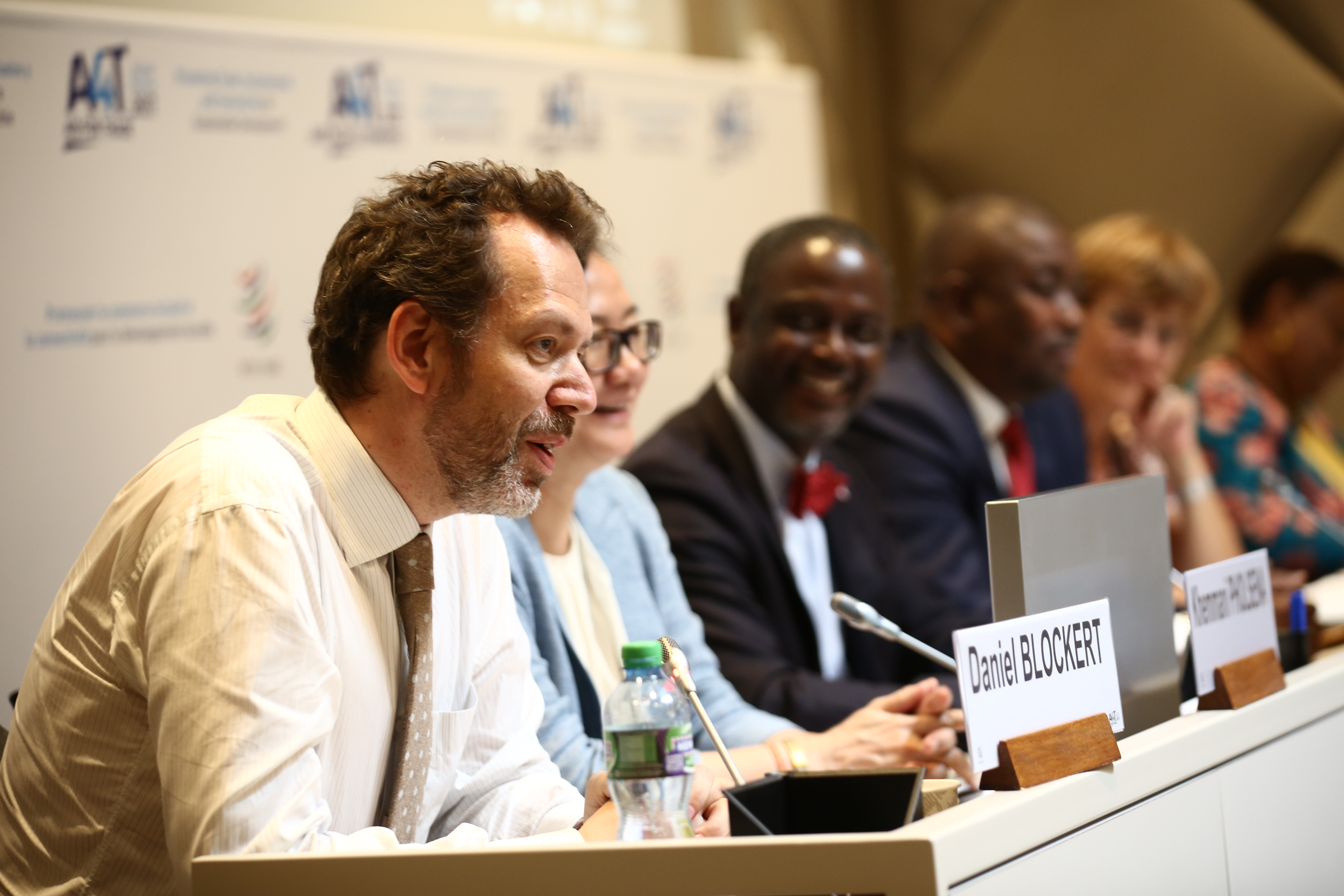
- Incumbent; Daniel Blockert since 2023
- Ministry for Foreign Affairs; Swedish Embassy, Jakarta
- Style: His or Her Excellency (formal); Mr. or Madam Ambassador (informal)
- Reports to: Minister for Foreign Affairs
- Seat: Jakarta, Indonesia (Note: The Swedish ambassador to Papua New Guinea is resident in Jakarta, Indonesia.)
- Appointer: Government of Sweden
- Term length: No fixed term
- Inaugural holder: Per Lind
- Formation: 1977

The Ambassador of Sweden to Papua New Guinea (known formally as the Ambassador of the Kingdom of Sweden to the Independent State of Papua New Guinea) is the official representative of the government of Sweden to the governor-general of Papua New Guinea and government of Papua New Guinea. Since Sweden does not have an embassy in Port Moresby, Sweden's ambassador to Papua New Guinea is based in Jakarta, Indonesia.

== History ==
Papua New Guinea, which was under Australian administration as the Territory of Papua and New Guinea and gained self-government in December 1973, achieved independence on 16 September 1975. On the same day, Sweden recognized the new state, the Independent State of Papua New Guinea.

Sweden and Papua New Guinea established diplomatic relations on 10 November 1976. From 1977, Sweden's ambassador in Canberra, Australia, was accredited to the capital of Papua New Guinea, Port Moresby.

The Swedish ambassador to Papua New Guinea has over the years been based alternately in Canberra and Stockholm. Since 2019, Sweden's ambassador in Jakarta, Indonesia, has also been concurrently accredited to Papua New Guinea.

== List of representatives ==
Name	Period	Title	Notes	Presented credentials	Ref
Per Lind	1977–1979	Ambassador	Resident in Canberra		
Lars Hedström	1979–1985	Ambassador	Resident in Canberra		
Hans Björk	1986–1990	Ambassador	Resident in Canberra		
Bo Heinebäck	1991–1994	Ambassador	Resident in Canberra		
–	1995–1996	Ambassador	Vacant		
Kaj Falkman	1996–1998	Ambassador	Resident in Stockholm		
–	1999–1999	Ambassador	Vacant		
Göran Hasselmark	2000–2002	Ambassador	Resident in Stockholm		
Greger Widgren	2003–2008	Ambassador	Resident in Stockholm		
Eha Arg	2008–2008	Chargé d'affaires ad interim	Resident in Stockholm		
Sven-Olof Petersson	2008–2014	Ambassador	Resident in Canberra		
Pär Ahlberger	2014–2019	Ambassador	Resident in Canberra		
Marina Berg	2019–2023	Ambassador	Resident in Jakarta		
Daniel Blockert	May 2025 – present	Ambassador	Resident in Jakarta	May 2025	
