= Hugo Tamm =

Swedish diplomat

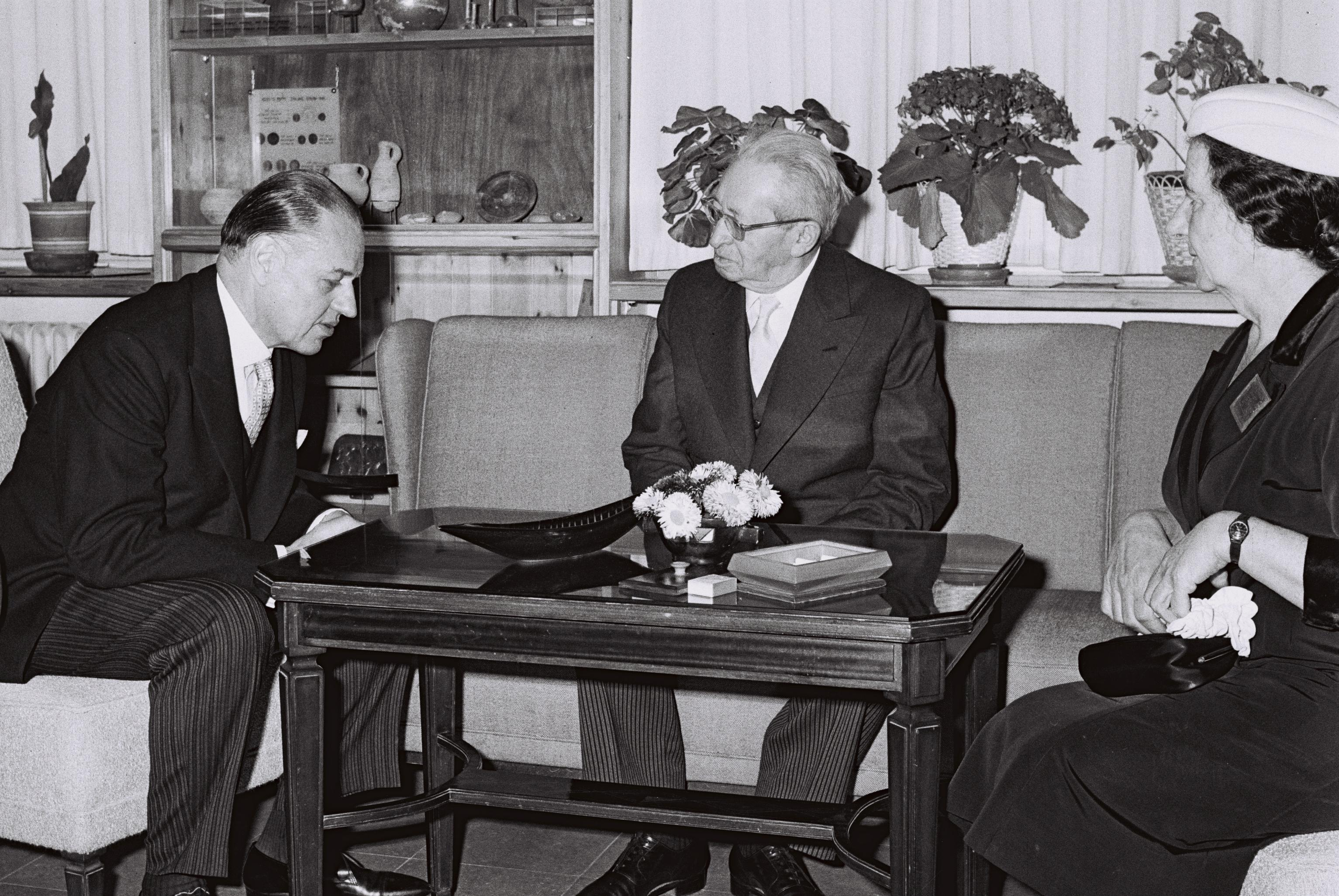
- Tamm (left) with president Yitzhak Ben-Zvi and foreign minister Golda Meir.
- Born: Nils Hugo Withmar Tamm; 5 September 1903; Svennevad, Sweden
- Died: 9 September 1990 (aged 87); Paris, France
- Education: Lundsbergs boarding school
- Alma mater: Uppsala University; Université des Hautes Etudes Internationales
- Occupation: Diplomat
- Years active: 1932–1971
- Spouse: Adrine-Lusina "Addy" Chahbaz (m. 1939)

Nils Hugo Withmar Tamm (5 September 1903 – 9 September 1990) was a Swedish diplomat. Tamm served as Swedish consul general in Berlin 1953–1959 and ambassador in Israel 1960–1963 as well as ambassador in South Africa 1964–1966.

== Early life ==
Tamm was born on 5 September 1903 in Svennevad, Hallsberg Municipality, Sweden, the son of Gustaf Tamm, a forester, and his wife Elisabeth (née Broberg). He was the grandson of a landowner and politician Hugo Tamm. Tamm passed studentexamen at Lundsbergs boarding school in 1922 and received a Bachelor of Arts degree at Uppsala University in 1925 and a Candidate of Law in 1929.

== Career ==
Tamm did his clerkship from 1929 to 1930 and studied at the Geneva Graduate Institute from 1931 to 1932 and became an attaché at the Ministry for Foreign Affairs in Stockholm in 1932. Tamm served in Helsinki in 1932, Chicago in 1934, Ankara in 1935 and at the Foreign Ministry in Stockholm in 1937.

He became second secretary in 1938 and served as second legation secretary in Rio de Janeiro in 1939. Tamm served as second vice consul in New York City in 1940 and acting consul general in Montreal in 1941 and first vice consul in New York City in 1942. Tamm was first secretary at the Foreign Ministry in Stockholm in 1945 and first legation secretary and chargé d'affaires ad interim in The Hague in 1945. He was then legation counsellor in Sofia in 1948 and in Budapest in 1949 as well as consul general in Berlin from 1953 to 1959. Tamm was ambassador in Tel Aviv from 1960 to 1963 and envoy in Pretoria from 1964 to 1966. He returned to Stockholm and the Foreign Ministry in 1966 and was then technical adviser at the Swedish UNESCO delegation in Paris from 1967 to 1971.

== Personal life ==
In 1939 he married Adrine-Lusina "Addy" Chahbaz (1904–1991) of Turkey.

== Death ==
Tamm died on 9 September 1990 in Paris, France. He is buried with his wife at Löts Cemetery in Enköping Municipality.

== Awards and decorations ==
- (Sweden) Commander 1st Class of the Order of the Polar Star (1971)
- (Sweden) Commander of the Order of the Polar Star (26 November 1964)
- (Sweden) Knight of the Order of the Polar Star (1952)
- (Argentina) Commander of the Order of Merit
- (Belgium) Officer of the Order of the Crown
- Knight of the Order of the White Rose of Finland
- (France) Knight of the Legion of Honour
- (Denmark) King Christian X's Liberty Medal

Diplomatic posts
Preceded by Eyvind Bratt	Consul General of Sweden to Berlin; 1953–1959	Succeeded by Östen Lundborg
Preceded by Östen Lundborg	Ambassador of Sweden to Israel; 1960–1963	Succeeded by Inga Thorsson
Preceded by Eyvind Bratt	Envoy of Sweden to South Africa; 1964–1966	Succeeded by Eric Virgin
