= Carl Bergenstråhle =

Swedish diplomat (1909–1977)

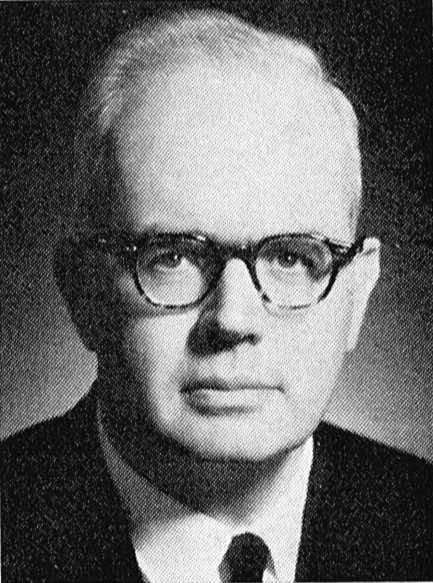
- Born: Carl Axel Victor Rudman Bergenstråhle; 16 November 1909; Stockholm, Sweden
- Died: 2 October 1977 (aged 67); Stockholm, Sweden
- Resting place: Solna Cemetery
- Education: Norra Real; Stockholm University College
- Occupation: Diplomat
- Years active: 1934–1975
- Spouse: Ulla-Greta Carlson (m. 1938)
- Children: 3
- Relatives: Sten Wåhlin (brother-in-law)

Carl Axel Victor Rudman Bergenstråhle (16 November 1909 – 2 October 1977) was a Swedish diplomat who served in the Ministry for Foreign Affairs from 1936 to 1975. After earning a law degree, he held early postings in London, Tehran, and Helsinki, and later served in senior roles including director at the ministry and director-general for legal affairs.

His overseas appointments included legation counsellor in Rome, embassy counsellor in Copenhagen, envoy to Canberra (1957–1960), consul general in London (1960–1962), ambassador to Addis Ababa and Antananarivo (from 1967), and later consul general in Berlin (1972–1975). He also represented Sweden on the Neutral Nations Supervisory Commission in Korea in 1956.

== Early life ==
Carl was born into the noble Bergenstråhle family in Stockholm, Sweden, on 16 November 1909. His father, Colonel Georg Bergenstråhle (1872–1943), was head of the Fortification Staff (fortifikationsstaben) in the Swedish Fortification Corps. His mother was Elsa Vilhelmina von Malmborg (born 1882) of the noble von Malmborg family. Bergenstråhle's younger brother was the civil engineer Nils Bergenstråhle (1911–1988). Bergenstråhle was the brother-in-law of Lieutenant General Sten Wåhlin, who was married to his sister Märtha Bergenstråhle (1913–2011).

He completed his secondary school examination on 10 May 1928 at Norra Real in Stockholm. He received a Candidate of Law degree from Stockholm University College on 4 November 1933.

== Career ==
Bergenstråhle completed his district court clerkship in the Stockholm County Judicial District from 1934 to 1935. He joined the Ministry for Foreign Affairs as an attaché in 1936 and served in London the following year. In 1939 he was appointed second legation secretary in Tehran, and in 1941 he held the same position in Helsinki. That same year he became second secretary at the Ministry for Foreign Affairs, was promoted to first secretary in 1943, and served as acting consul in Mariehamn from 1944 to 1945. He then served as first legation secretary in Oslo from 1945 to 1947.

In 1949 he was appointed director (byråchef) at the Ministry for Foreign Affairs. He became legation counsellor in Rome in 1951 and embassy counsellor in Copenhagen in 1954. In 1956 he served as Sweden's representative on the Neutral Nations Supervisory Commission in Korea. He was envoy to Canberra from 1957 to 1960, consul general in London from 1960 to 1962, and thereafter director-general for legal affairs and deputy head of the Legal Department at the Ministry for Foreign Affairs from 1962 to 1963. From 1963 to 1967 he served as inspector of the Foreign Service. He was appointed ambassador to Addis Ababa and Antananarivo in 1967, and following the establishment of diplomatic relations between Sweden and South Yemen in 1970, he was also accredited as ambassador to Aden in 1971.

On 18 April 1972, Bergenstråhle and his wife were aboard East African Airways Flight 720 en route from Nairobi to London but disembarked during a stopover in Addis Ababa. The aircraft subsequently crashed during takeoff. He later served as consul general in Berlin from 1972 to 1975.

== Personal life ==
In 1938, Bergenstråhle married Ulla-Greta Carlson (1914–2013), the daughter of director Mauritz Carlson and Ingrid (née Geijer). They had three children: Johan (born 1941), Gustaf (born 1942), and Ingrid (1944–1958).

== Death ==
After a period of illness, Bergenstråhle died on 2 October 1977 in Stockholm. The funeral service was held on 10 October 1977 at Hedvig Eleonora Church. He was buried in the family grave at Solna Cemetery in Solna Municipality, near Stockholm.

In an obituary, Ambassador Adolf Croneborg described Bergenstråhle as follows: "He was an exceptionally upright, conscientious, and capable civil servant who devoted all his energies to fulfilling his duties within the foreign service. [...] He became well known as a wise and good man who earned everyone's trust."

== Awards and decorations ==
=== Swedish ===
- (Sweden) Commander of the Order of the Polar Star (11 November 1966)
- (Sweden) Knight of the Order of the Polar Star (1952)

=== Foreign ===
- (Denmark) Commander of the Order of the Dannebrog
- Commander of the Order of the Lion of Finland
- (Italy) Commander of the Order of Merit of the Italian Republic
- (Norway) Knight 1st Class of the Order of St. Olav

Diplomatic posts
Preceded by Martin Kastengren	Envoy of Sweden to Australia; 1957–1960	Succeeded by Nils-Eric Ekblad
Preceded by Magnus Hallenborg	Consul General of Sweden to London; 1960–1962	Succeeded by Göran von Otter
Preceded by Erland Kleen	Ambassador of Sweden to Ethiopia; 1967–1972	Succeeded by Lars Hedström
Preceded by Erland Kleen	Ambassador of Sweden to Madagascar; 1967–1972	Succeeded by Lars Hedström
Preceded by None	Ambassador of Sweden to South Yemen; 1971–1972	Succeeded by Lars Hedström
Preceded by Åke Sjölin	Consul General of Sweden to Berlin; 1972–1975	Succeeded by Claës König
