= East African Airways Flight 720 =

1972 aviation accident

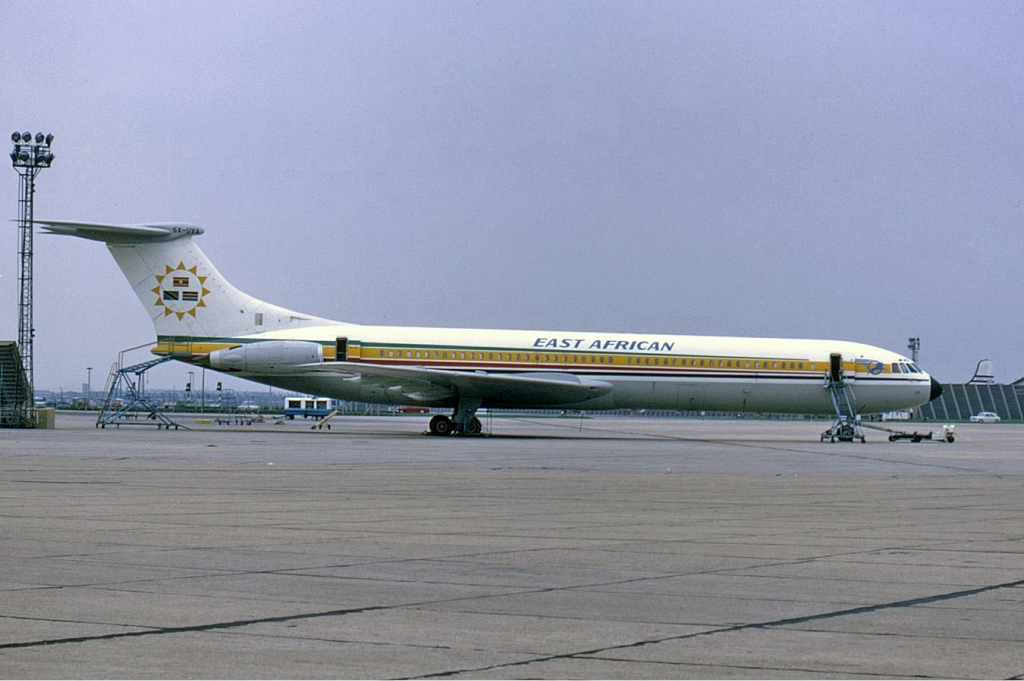
- 5X-UVA, the Vickers VC-10 involved in the accident

Accident
- Date: 18 April 1972
- Summary: Impacted foreign object during take-off, improper braking assembly led to braking failure during aborted take-off
- Site: Haile Selassie 1st International Airport,, Bole Medhanealem, Addis Ababa, Ethiopia

Aircraft
- Aircraft type: Vickers Super VC10-1154
- Operator: East African Airways
- Registration: 5X-UVA
- Flight origin: Embakasi International Airport, Nairobi, Kenya
- 1st stopover: Haile Selassie 1st International Airport, Addis Ababa, Ethiopia
- Last stopover: Rome-Fiumicino Airport, Rome, Italy
- Destination: Heathrow Airport, London, United Kingdom
- Passengers: 96
- Crew: 11
- Fatalities: 43
- Injuries: 15
- Survivors: 64

East African Airways Flight 720 (EC720) was an international scheduled passenger flight, operated by jointly operated East African Airways, routing from Kenya via Ethiopia and Italy to the United Kingdom with a Vickers VC10. On 18 April 1972, the aircraft burst into flames and crashed while taking off from Addis Ababa Bole International Airport, killing 43 out of 107 occupants on board. It is the third deadliest aircraft accident on Ethiopian soil.

The investigation, led by the Ethiopian Civil Aviation Administration, concluded that the crash was caused by partial loss of braking effort due to incorrect re-assembly of the braking system, leading to the aircraft's inability to stop within the remaining runway distance. The aircraft struck a foreign object during take-off, causing it to vibrate violently. Crew members properly executed the necessary procedure to abort the take-off; however, the braking failure caused the aircraft to overrun the runway.

== Aircraft ==
The aircraft was a 5-year-old Vickers Super VC10 with registration 5X-UVA and a manufacturer's serial number of 881. The aircraft was built by British Aircraft Corporation in 1966 and went into service that same year. It had flown a total of 18,586 hours and had been maintained in accordance with its maintenance schedule.

== Passengers and crew ==
The aircraft was carrying 96 passengers and 11 crew members, totaling 107 occupants. According to The New York Times, many of the passengers were children of British nationalities who were returning from Easter vacation. There were also Italians on board the aircraft. The crew members were mostly East Africans.

Sweden's then ambassador to Addis Ababa, Carl Bergenstråhle, and his wife were on board the plane from Nairobi but disembarked during the stopover in Addis Ababa and were unharmed. Thorsten Månsson, superintendent of the Swedish Church's aid organization Lutherhjälpen, was also unharmed. Three other Swedes who were on board when the plane took off but survived were the nurses Solveig Johansson and Margareta Fallgren, as well as Director Valdemar Törner of the Lutheran World Federation.

The aircraft was flown by Captain John Vale (42), who had logged a total of 8,769 flight hours, of which 752 hours were on the Vickers VC10. His co-pilot, First Officer Ronald Botto (26), had logged 2,744 flight hours with 640 hours on type. The pilots were accompanied by Navigating Officer Frank MacNabb (45) and Flight Engineer Brian Twist (34).

== Flight ==
=== Pre-accident ===
Flight 720 was a flight from the Kenyan capital Nairobi to London with intermediate stops in Addis Ababa and Rome. On 18 April 1972, it departed Nairobi's Embakasi Airport (now Jomo Kenyatta International Airport) at 09:55 EAT (06:55 UTC) and arrived in Bole Airport at 11:23 EAT. A total of 40 passengers disembarked and 15 passengers boarded the aircraft.

While the aircraft was on the ramp, Flight Engineer Twist noticed that hydraulic fluid had been leaking from the No.1 rear main wheel. Twist deemed the leak as still acceptable for a flight to London and therefore did not report the problem.

The flight crew was cleared to start up the aircraft and taxied out for take-off from runway 07. Few minutes later, the flight crew noticed that there were dead birds on the runway and reported to the tower that they had hit one of the birds during the landing phase. As such, the crew requested the tower to clear the birds from the runway. The tower then dispatched a fire truck to remove the birds. A short while later, the aircraft reached the pad at the end of the runway and lined up for take-off.

=== Accident ===
At 12:38 EAT, Flight 720 was cleared for take-off. The crew then added thrust and called "rolling". The aircraft had just passed the mid-point of the runway when suddenly a loud bang was heard. The right nose wheel had burst after striking a steel jacking pad from a Cessna 185, which had departed earlier from the airport. The aircraft shook violently and the nose rose momentarily before coming down again. The flight crew decided to abort the take-off, activated the thrust reverser and applied brakes to stop the aircraft. Passengers recalled that the brakes were "screaming" with white smoke reportedly spewing out from the wheel. The aircraft veered slightly to the right.

Shortly after, the second loud bang was heard as the No.1 rear main tyre also burst. The aircraft then ran out of runway, crossed a storm drain and became momentarily airborne. The left outer wing then struck a steel lattice tower, rupturing the fuel lines and causing the aircraft to burst into flames. Relatives of those on board recalled that fire could be seen trailing behind the aircraft. The aircraft then slammed onto the ground, breaking up the fuselage before finally coming to rest and catching fire.

=== Immediate aftermath ===
The aircraft had broken up into three major components, leaking out most of the 50,000 kg of fuel on board. The fire blocked the right emergency exits. The force of the impact jammed the left emergency exits. However, it also had created a large hole gaping at the forward left fuselage. Most of the passengers decided to evacuate through the hole.

The majority of those on board had survived the crash; however some passengers succumbed to the fire. Some of the passengers and crew members died while helping others escape from the burning aircraft. Those who had managed to leave the aircraft found that they were blocked by the airport's barbed-wire perimeter fence. They had to walk down the slope alongside streams of jet fuel flowing from the aircraft. This fuel later ignited, trapping several people, some of whom later died.

The fire truck which had been dispatched earlier to clear dead birds from the runway was the first to arrive at the crash site. Other fire trucks were later dispatched to the site. From 13:25 onwards, the Addis Ababa firefighting units were also involved in the rescue operation.

In the aftermath of the accident, 20 people had to be taken to the Addis Ababa Seventh Day Adventist Hospital, of whom 16 were critically wounded. Some of the wounded were flown to the United Kingdom by the Royal Air Force. Meanwhile, 36 bodies were found by rescuers. The death toll later rose as several survivors succumbed to their injuries. In all, a total of 43 people, 35 passengers and 8 crew members, were killed in the crash.

== Investigation ==
=== Nose wheel failure ===
The nose wheel failure was attributed to penetration from a steel component on the runway. The steel component was eventually identified as part of a steel jacking pad from a Cessna 185. The jacking pad was lying approximately 2,147 meters from the beginning of the runway and had been lying on the runway for 4 hours and 40 minutes. The relatively small size of the object made it unlikely to be seen by ground crew except by pure chance. As it had been left off several hours after the daily runway inspection, there was no chance of it being discovered by anyone. Also, the fire truck which earlier had been dispatched to clear the runway of dead birds did not clear the area where the jacking pad was lying, considering that the dead birds were located on the other part of the runway.

=== Decision to abandon take-off ===
The flight crew of Flight 720 decided to abandon take-off solely due to the nose wheel burst. The flight crew seemed to be compounded by the severe vibration and loss of control of the aircraft. The stressful and alarming situation at hand caused the flight crew to immediately presume that the aircraft was in non-airworthy condition and therefore decided to abandon the take-off. The hasty decision of the flight crew was appropriate, as the speed of the aircraft was still below the decision speed (V1) of 140 knots and the nature of emergency was sufficiently serious, despite the flight crew's insufficient consideration of the true nature of the emergency.

Their quick decision was also appropriate since the length of the runway combined with the aircraft's speed at the time was sufficient for a safe rejected take-off. The nose wheel failure occurred approximately 2,158 meters from the beginning of the runway and brakes were immediately applied by the flight crew. Calculations made by investigators found that the aircraft should have been able to stop safely before reaching the end of the runway.

=== Incorrect brake reassembly ===
Even though Flight 720 should have been able to stop within the safe runway distance, the aircraft managed to overrun the runway. It was later discovered that only 70% of the aircraft's ability to brake was applied during the accident. This decreased performance was due to multiple defects in the aircraft's braking system, mainly due to the bursting of the No.1 rear wheel, reduced operation of the No.4 front brake and an unexplained failure on the No.2 rear brake to operate successfully. The loss of performance could be attributed to multiple defects found within the No.2 rear anti-skid system, incorrect fitting of the left rear transfer tube, and blockage from incorrect assembly of the restrictor pack inside the No.4 front brake.

Examination on the servo unit of the No.4 front brake revealed that a restrictor pack had been incorrectly assembled, reducing the flow of hydraulic fluid to the brakes. As the anti-skid unit was applied by the flight crew, the brake pressure was unable to recover at a sufficient pace. Thus, the brakes didn't work at an optimum level.

The No.1 rear brake was cross-coupled with the No.2 anti-skid unit and the No.2 rear brake was cross-coupled with the No.1 anti-skid unit. To properly cross-couple both brakes, the axle was fitted with a rear transfer tube. Examination on the tube, however, revealed that it had been placed in a reverse position. This shouldn't have been a significant problem since both brakes were serviceable. However, the presence of a foreign seal (rubber ring) inside the hydraulic coupling connecting the end of the transfer unit inhibited the No.2 anti-skid unit to work properly. As such, the brake pressure of the No.1 rear brake was not able to be relieved by the No.2 anti-skid unit. It then locked the wheel and caused it to burst.

=== Conclusion ===
The Ethiopian Civil Aviation Administration concluded the cause of the accident with the following:

The accident was due to a partial loss of braking effort arising from incorrect re-assembly of part of the braking system, as a result of which the aircraft could not be stopped within the emergency distance remaining following a properly executed abandoned take-off procedure
