= Pierre Schori =

Swedish diplomat and politician

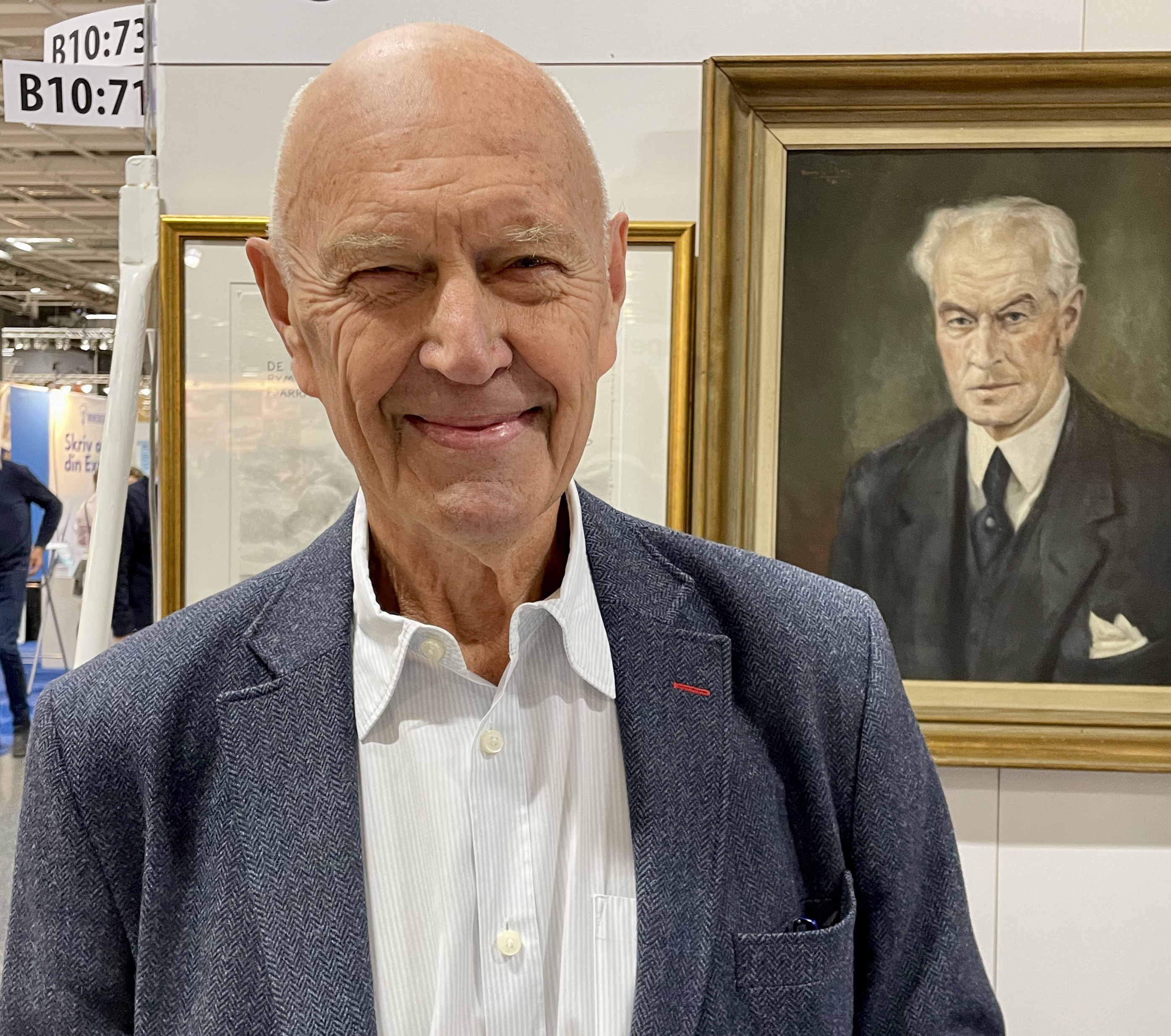
- Schori in 2024

Permanent Representative to the United Nations
- In office 2000–2004

State Secretary for Foreign Affairs
- In office 1982–1991

Personal details
- Born: 14 October 1938 (age 87) Norrköping, Sweden
- Party: Swedish Social Democratic Party
- Occupation: diplomat and politician

Jean-Pierre Olov Schori (born 14 October 1938) is a Swedish diplomat and politician. For many years he was international secretary in the Swedish Social Democratic Party and a close assistant to the Swedish Prime Minister Olof Palme. He assisted Palme in the Socialist International Movement and took part in the struggle against the fascist rule in Greece, Portugal and Spain. Schori is among the editors-in-chief of Tiden, a theoretical journal of the Social Democratic Party.

He graduated from Lund University in 1962 with an M.A degree.

In April 2005 he was appointed Special Representative for Côte d'Ivoire by United Nations Secretary General Kofi Annan (UNOCI, succeeded by Choi Young-jin from South Korea in October 2007). He was Secretary General of Sweden's foreign ministry 1982–91, later member of the cabinet 1994–99 and Deputy Foreign Minister responsible for issues of foreign aid and migration, Social Democratic member of the European Parliament, and Sweden's ambassador to the United Nations.

Schori was appointed election supervisor in Zimbabwe 2002 by the European Union. He was also suggested as the United Nations' administrator for Kosovo, but never became one after protests from the United States. They objected to Schori's prior support for Fidel Castro and other socialist regimes. Schori responded by accusing the Bush administration of "McCarthyism".

In March 2007 Schori was named as the general director of FRIDE, a defunct think-tank based in Madrid.

Schori is sympathetically portrayed as Peter Sorman in the fellow 1968-radical Jan Guillou's Hamilton novels, with a clearly anti-imperialist attitude, at least as critical against the United States as against China or the Soviet Union.

In a TV interview on 22 February 2004 the Israeli ambassador to Sweden, Zvi Mazel, called Schori and former Swedish Foreign Minister Sten Andersson "professional anti-Israelis".

Political offices
Preceded by Leif Leifland	State Secretary for Foreign Affairs; 1982–1991	Succeeded by Lars-Åke Nilsson
Diplomatic posts
Preceded by Hans Dahlgren	Permanent Representative to the United Nations; 2000–2004	Succeeded by Anders Lidén
Non-profit organization positions
Preceded by Frida Nokken	Board Chair, International Alert; 2012-2016	Succeeded by Chris Mullin
