= List of ambassadors of Sweden to Vanuatu =

Ambassador of Sweden to Vanuatu
- Lesser coat of arms of the Kingdom of Sweden

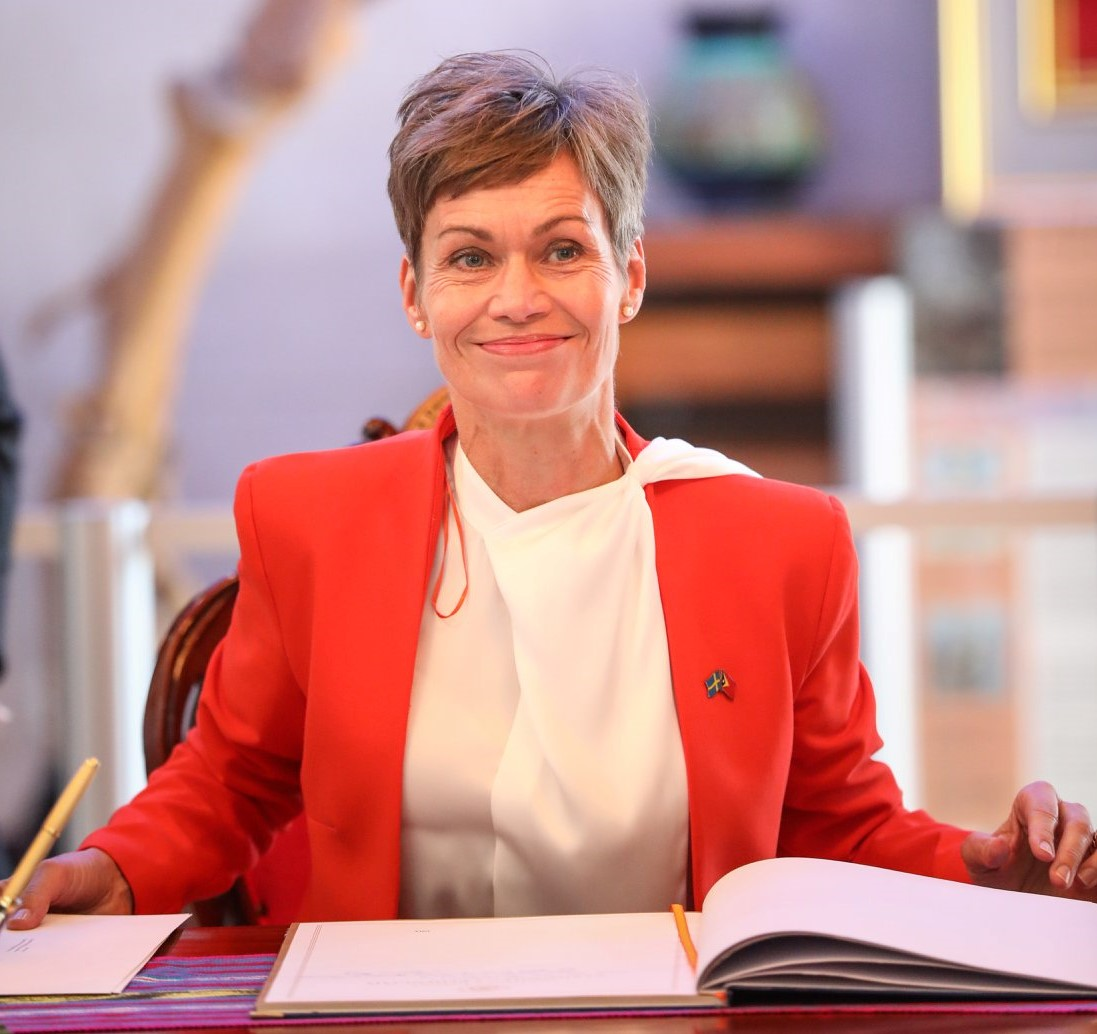
- Incumbent; Marina Berg since 2025
- Ministry for Foreign Affairs
- Style: His or Her Excellency (formal); Mr. or Madam Ambassador (informal)
- Reports to: Minister for Foreign Affairs
- Seat: Stockholm, Sweden (Note: Since 2025, the Swedish ambassador to Vanuatu is based in Stockholm, Sweden.)
- Appointer: Government of Sweden
- Term length: No fixed term
- Inaugural holder: Lars Hedström
- Formation: 1981

The Ambassador of Sweden to Vanuatu (formally known as the Ambassador of the Kingdom of Sweden to the Republic of Vanuatu) is the official representative of the government of Sweden to the president of Vanuatu and government of Vanuatu. Since Sweden does not have an embassy in Port Vila, the Swedish ambassador to Vanuatu is based in Stockholm, Sweden.

== History ==
New Hebrides became independent as the Republic of Vanuatu on 30 July 1980. On the same day, Sweden's ambassador to Canberra, Australia, Lars Hedström, attended the independence ceremony, at which Sweden recognized the new state.

Sweden and Vanuatu established diplomatic relations on 27 September 1981. In the same year, Sweden's ambassador in Canberra, Australia, was also accredited to Port Vila. The Swedish ambassador to Vanuatu has over the years been stationed alternately in Canberra and Stockholm.

Since 2025 the post of Swedish ambassador to Vanuatu is again held by a Stockholm-based ambassador-at-large, who is also ambassador to 10 other countries in Oceania.

== List of representatives ==
Name	Period	Title	Resident / Concurrent accreditation	Notes	Presented credentials	Ref
Lars Hedström	1981–1985	Ambassador	Resident in Canberra			
Hans Björk	1986–1990	Ambassador	Resident in Canberra			
Bo Heinebäck	1990–1994	Ambassador	Resident in Canberra			
–	1995–1995	Ambassador		Vacant		
Kaj Falkman	1996–1998	Ambassador	Resident in Stockholm			
–	1999–1999	Ambassador		Vacant		
Göran Hasselmark	2000–2002	Ambassador	Resident in Stockholm			
Lars-Erik Wingren	2002–2003	Ambassador	Resident in Canberra			
Greger Widgren	2004–2008	Ambassador	Resident in Stockholm			
Eha Arg	2008–2008	Chargé d'affaires	Resident in Stockholm			
Sven-Olof Petersson	2008–2014	Ambassador	Resident in Canberra			
Pär Ahlberger	2014–2019	Ambassador	Resident in Canberra			
?	2019–2025	Ambassador				
Marina Berg	2025–present	Ambassador	Resident in Stockholm			
