= Lars Hedström =

Swedish diplomat (1919–2004)

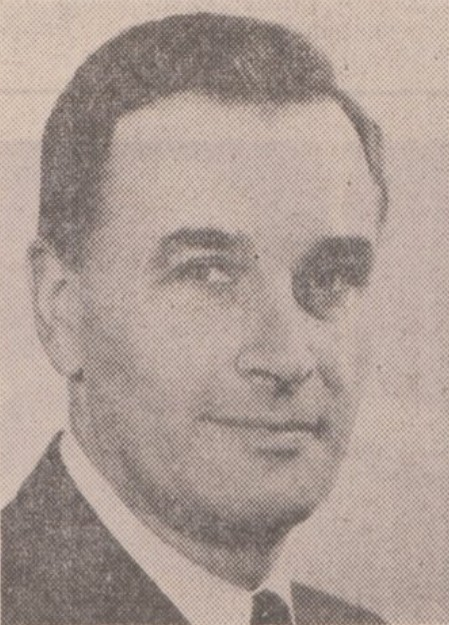
- Born: Lars Erik Hedström; 2 November 1919; Eksjö, Sweden
- Died: 30 November 2004 (aged 85); Linköping, Sweden
- Education: Uppsala University
- Occupation: Diplomat
- Years active: 1945–1985
- Spouse(s): Christina Lindgren (m. 1944; died 1985) Catharina Moselius (m. 1994)
- Children: 3

Lars Erik Hedström (2 November 1919 – 30 November 2004) was a Swedish diplomat who served the Ministry for Foreign Affairs for nearly four decades. After taking a law degree at Uppsala University and completing his clerkship, he joined the ministry in 1947. He served in London and Copenhagen, became consul in San Francisco in 1957, and in 1963 was appointed deputy head of the Department for International Law, with the rank of director-general for legal affairs. There, he worked on international treaty issues, including continental shelf matters. He was later appointed ambassador to Tunis and Tripoli (1967–1972), Addis Ababa (1972–1975), and Bucharest (1976–1979). From 1979 to 1985 he served as ambassador to Canberra, with concurrent accreditations in the Pacific.

== Early life ==
Hedström was born on 2 November 1919 in Eksjö, Sweden, the son of Eric Hedström and his wife Emilia (née Ericsson). He completed his upper secondary education in Eksjö in 1938 and subsequently underwent reserve officer training. He received a Candidate of Law degree from Uppsala University in 1944. He further improved his language skills and for a short time served as municipal mayor in his hometown.

== Career ==
Hedström completed his district court clerkship from 1945 to 1947 and joined the Ministry for Foreign Affairs as an attaché in 1947. He subsequently served in London and Copenhagen, was appointed consul in San Francisco in 1957, and became acting head of department at the ministry in 1961. In 1963 he was named deputy head of the ministry's Department for International Law, with the rank of director general for law affairs (utrikesråd). In this role, he handled matters relating to international treaties, including questions concerning the continental shelf.

He was appointed ambassador to Tunis and Tripoli in 1967, serving until 1972, and then to Addis Ababa from 1972 to 1975, with concurrent accreditation to Aden and Antananarivo from 1973. From 1976 to 1979 he served as ambassador to Bucharest. During his posting in Romania, the devastating Vrancea earthquake struck on 4 March 1977. The Swedish embassy in Bucharest was severely damaged, and Hedström was among those evacuated.

In 1979 he was appointed ambassador to Canberra, with concurrent accreditations to Port Moresby and Honiara, serving until 1985. On 30 July 1980, as Sweden's ambassador in Canberra, Hedström attended the independence ceremony in Port Vila, when Sweden formally recognized the new state of Vanuatu, formerly known as the New Hebrides. He was subsequently accredited as ambassador to Port Vila from 1982 to 1985.

As ambassador to Australia, he signed several important bilateral agreements, including the 1981 agreement between Sweden and Australia on conditions and controls for nuclear transfers for peaceful purposes, as well as the agreement on the avoidance of double taxation and the prevention of fiscal evasion with respect to taxes on income.

== Personal life ==
In 1944, Hedström married Christina Lindgren (1921–1985), the daughter of director Oscar Lindgren and Anna (née Lindskog). Christina died in Canberra after a brief illness, shortly before his retirement and their planned return to Sweden.

In 1994, he married Catharina Moselius (born 1949), the daughter of the art historian and art educator Carl David Moselius (1890–1968) and Carna (née Hultmark).

Hedström had three children, two daughters, Anna and Cecilia (born 1947 and 1949), and son Johan (born 1956).

== Death ==
Hedström died on 11 November 2004 in Linköping.

== Awards and decorations ==
- (Sweden) For Zealous and Devoted Service of the Realm (August 1976)
- (Sweden) Commander of the Order of the Polar Star (1 December 1973)
- (Sweden) Knight of the Order of the Polar Star (1965)
- (Denmark) Knight of the Order of the Dannebrog

Diplomatic posts
Preceded by Per Bertil Kollberg	Ambassador of Sweden to Tunisia; 1967–1972	Succeeded by Marc Giron
Preceded by Per Bertil Kollberg	Ambassador of Sweden to Libya; 1967–1972	Succeeded by Marc Giron
Preceded by Carl Bergenstråhle	Ambassador of Sweden to Ethiopia; 1972–1975	Succeeded by Bengt Friedman
Preceded by Carl Bergenstråhle	Ambassador of Sweden to South Yemen; 1973–1975	Succeeded by Bengt Friedman
Preceded by Carl Bergenstråhle	Ambassador of Sweden to Madagascar; 1973–1975	Succeeded by Bengt Friedman
Preceded by Otto Rathsman	Ambassador of Sweden to Romania; 1976–1979	Succeeded by Hans Sköld
Preceded by Per Lind	Ambassador of Sweden to Australia; 1979–1985	Succeeded by Hans Björk
Preceded by Per Lind	Ambassador of Sweden to Papua New Guinea; 1979–1985	Succeeded by Hans Björk
Preceded by None	Ambassador of Sweden to the Solomon Islands; 1979–1985	Succeeded by Hans Björk
Preceded by None	Ambassador of Sweden to Vanuatu; 1981–1985	Succeeded by Hans Björk
