= United Arts Club Dublin =

Private arts club in Dublin, Ireland

United Arts Club
- Formation: 1907
- Type: Private arts club
- Headquarters: 3 Fitzwilliam Street Upper
- Location: Dublin, Ireland
- Website: unitedartsclubdublin.com

The United Arts Club is a private arts club in Dublin, Ireland. Founded in 1907, it has occupied a Georgian townhouse at 3 Fitzwilliam Street Upper since 1920. It was established as a meeting place for people involved in and interested in the arts.

== History ==
The club was founded in 1907 during the period of the Irish Literary Revival. Accounts of its early circle name W. B. Yeats, Lady Gregory, George "AE" Russell, Ellie Duncan, Casimir Markievicz and Constance Markievicz. Unlike many private clubs of the period, it admitted women as full members from the beginning and was not aligned with a political party or religion.

The club moved to 3 Fitzwilliam Street Upper in 1920. The National Inventory of Architectural Heritage records the premises as a four-bay, four-storey former townhouse built around 1800. It identifies the building as being of architectural, artistic and social interest and notes the survival of much of its original façade, sash windows, ironwork, Ionic doorcase and fanlight.

== Clubhouse and activities ==
The clubhouse contains members' rooms, exhibition and event spaces, a bar and accommodation. Works of art donated by members are displayed throughout the building.

A 2011 feature in The Irish Times described a programme that included exhibitions, drawing classes, talks, dinners and musical events. The same account described the club's membership as spanning several artistic disciplines as well as people with a general interest in the arts.

== Later developments ==
In 2012, the club's bar was refurbished in connection with the Irish television programme At Your Service.

In 2025, The Irish Times reported that the club had more than 500 members, following a decline to fewer than 200 after the COVID-19 pandemic. The report also described restoration work in parts of the building and the continuing use of its rooms for classes, exhibitions, concerts and other arts events.
