= Embassy of Sweden, Canberra =

Diplomatic mission of Sweden in Canberra, Australia

- Location: Canberra
- Address: 5 Turrana Street; Yarralumla ACT 2600; Australia
- Coordinates: 35.309609°S 149.114807°E
- Opened: 1947
- Ambassador: Klas Molin
- Jurisdiction: Australia; New Zealand
- Website: Official website

The Embassy of Sweden in Canberra is Sweden's diplomatic mission in Australia. The embassy opened in 1947 and has been located in Canberra since 1951. The ambassador since 2025 is Klas Molin.

== History ==
In 1851, the first Swedish-Norwegian consuls in Sydney, Melbourne and Port Adelaide were appointed. The first Swedish consul general was appointed in 1906. In 1946, the Swedish Export Association requested that a proposal be presented to the 1947 Parliament to convert the consulate general in Sydney into a diplomatic mission in Canberra. In a letter to the minister for foreign affairs, it was emphasized that significant disadvantages, particularly from an export perspective, were caused by Sweden's continued lack of diplomatic representation in Australia.

In 1947, a Swedish legation was established in Sydney where the consulate general of Sweden was formerly situated, in Cricket House on 254 George Street. Constans Lundquist's role as consul general was upgraded to that of envoy. Lundquist kick-started the diplomatic move from Sydney to the developing Canberra in 1947. He hired his brother Edvard Lundquist, a country architect from Västmanland, to draw the outline of the two-storey building. The legation was inaugurated in 1951 in the suburb of Yarralumla in Canberra, as one of the oldest embassies in the city. When the legation moved from Sydney to Canberra on 1 January 1951, its office for maritime affairs remained in Sydney at 254 George Street.

In 1963, an agreement was reached that the Swedish legation in Canberra and the Australian legation in Stockholm would be elevated to embassies. The then envoy in Canberra, Gösta af Petersens, was appointed ambassador in connection with this.

== Staff and tasks ==
=== Staff ===
The embassy staff in Canberra consists of three diplomats from the Ministry for Foreign Affairs, a defence attache and seven locally employed officers.

=== Tasks ===
The Swedish embassy in Canberra is a relatively small embassy. Despite the size of the embassy, it covers a large area of activity. The embassy's tasks include political, trade policy, immigration and legal issues, defense issues, press, information and cultural policy issues, as well as consular and migration-related matters. The embassy's responsibilities include Australia, New Zealand, Papua New Guinea, Vanuatu, Samoa, Fiji, Solomon Islands and Tonga. The embassy performs political and economic reporting and in the handling of various bilateral matters between Sweden and Australia. The tasks also include Sweden-promoting activities conducted by the embassy. The embassy also maintains contact with the Swedish honorary consulates in Adelaide, Brisbane, Cairns, Darwin, Hobart, Melbourne, Perth and Sydney as well as Business Sweden's office in Sydney.

== Buildings ==
The Swedish Embassy was designed by the architects Peddle Thorp & Walker from Sydney in collaboration with the Swedish architect Edvard Lundquist, whose sketches formed the basis for the work. The building has a Swedish expression but is adapted to the conditions in Canberra. The result was very successful. In 1952, the Swedish Embassy building received the Sir Sulman Award for Public and Monumental Buildings. It was the first building in Canberra to receive the prestigious award and the architects received a gold medal for their efforts. The buildings' characteristic Swedish architecture was well integrated with the conditions prevailing on the vast plot. Both Swedish and Australian materials and crafts were used. Inside the embassy, Swedish wood, triple-glazed glass from the historic province of Småland and Swedish green marble can be found in the fireplace.

Few exterior and interior changes have taken place since the buildings were originally erected. In 2004–2005, some interior renovations were made to the residence and the terraces. At the same time, the residence was made accessible to people with disabilities. All work were carried out in consultation with local authorities to ensure that the buildings' cultural-historical values were maintained. When a thorough renovation was done in 2014–2015, it was long-awaited. The National Property Board of Sweden replaced all installations for electricity and plumbing and installed central cooling. The surface layers were renovated or replaced, everything from wooden floors and interior stone stairs to a new exterior copper roof and restoration of the façade color to the original white. The building's many windows turned pigeon blue again. Accessibility work was also in focus. The embassy has a new ramp to the chancellery. The renovation was done in collaboration with the architectural firm White and the local architectural firm Guida Moseley Brown Architects. In November 2017, the renovation was awarded an honorable mention at the National Architecture Awards in Australia, a so-called National Commendation in the Heritage category.

Solar panels placed on the large plot cover the embassy's energy needs. The solar panels are mounted on a stand on the ground and are with a size of 24 meters x 3.2 meters the largest in Canberra. The solar panels supply electricity all year round.

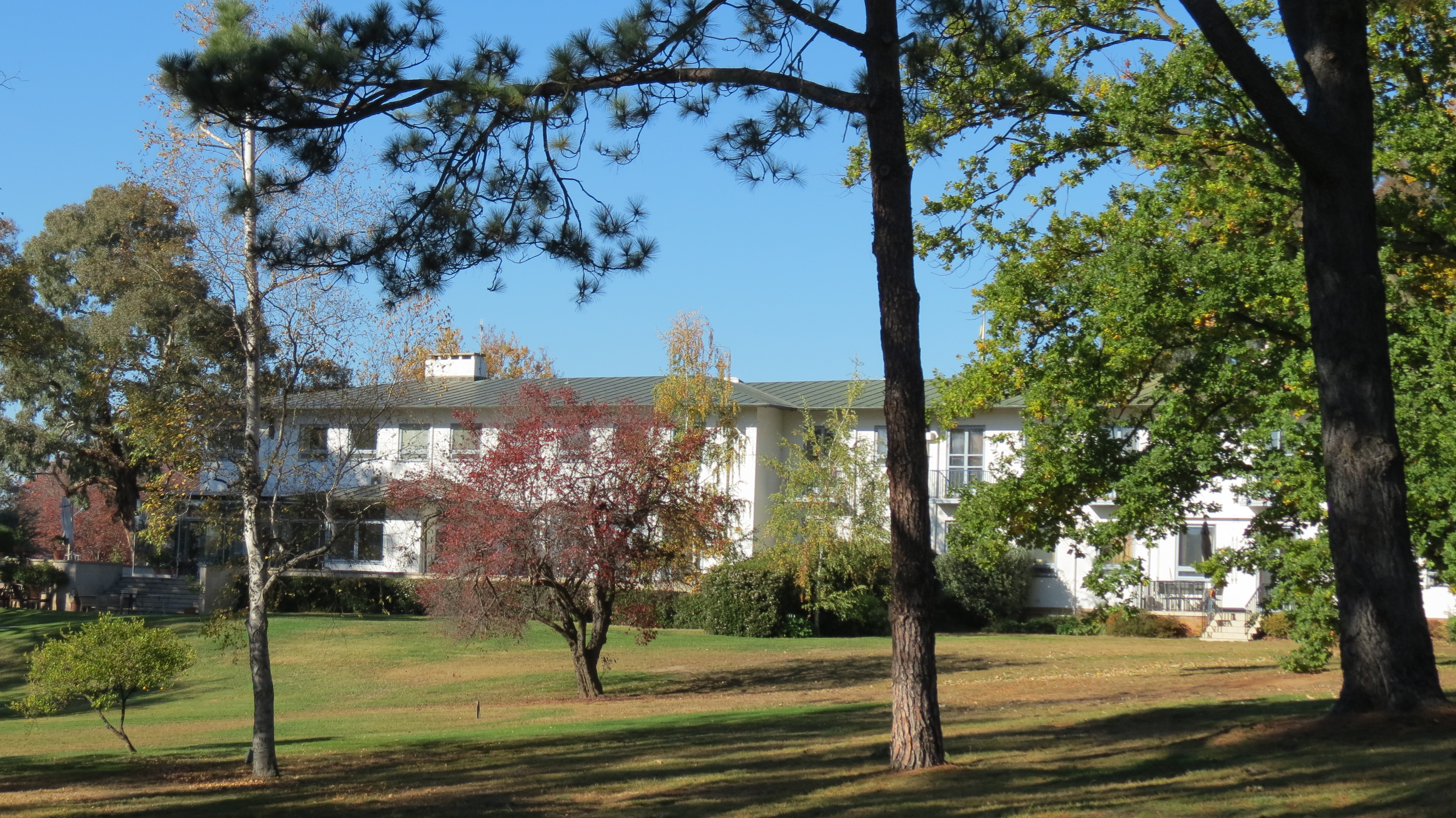
Embassy building in Yarralumla.

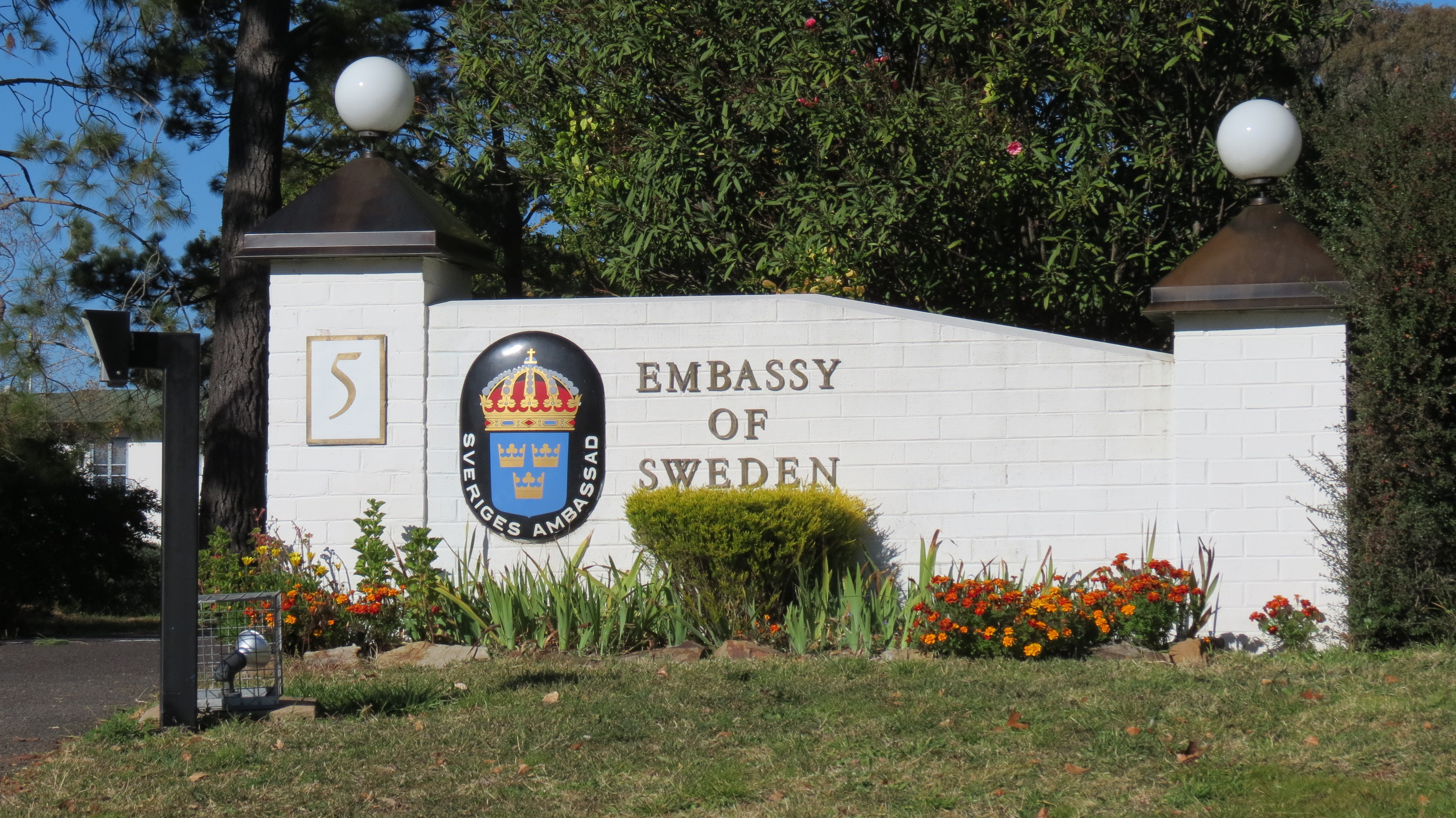
Entrance

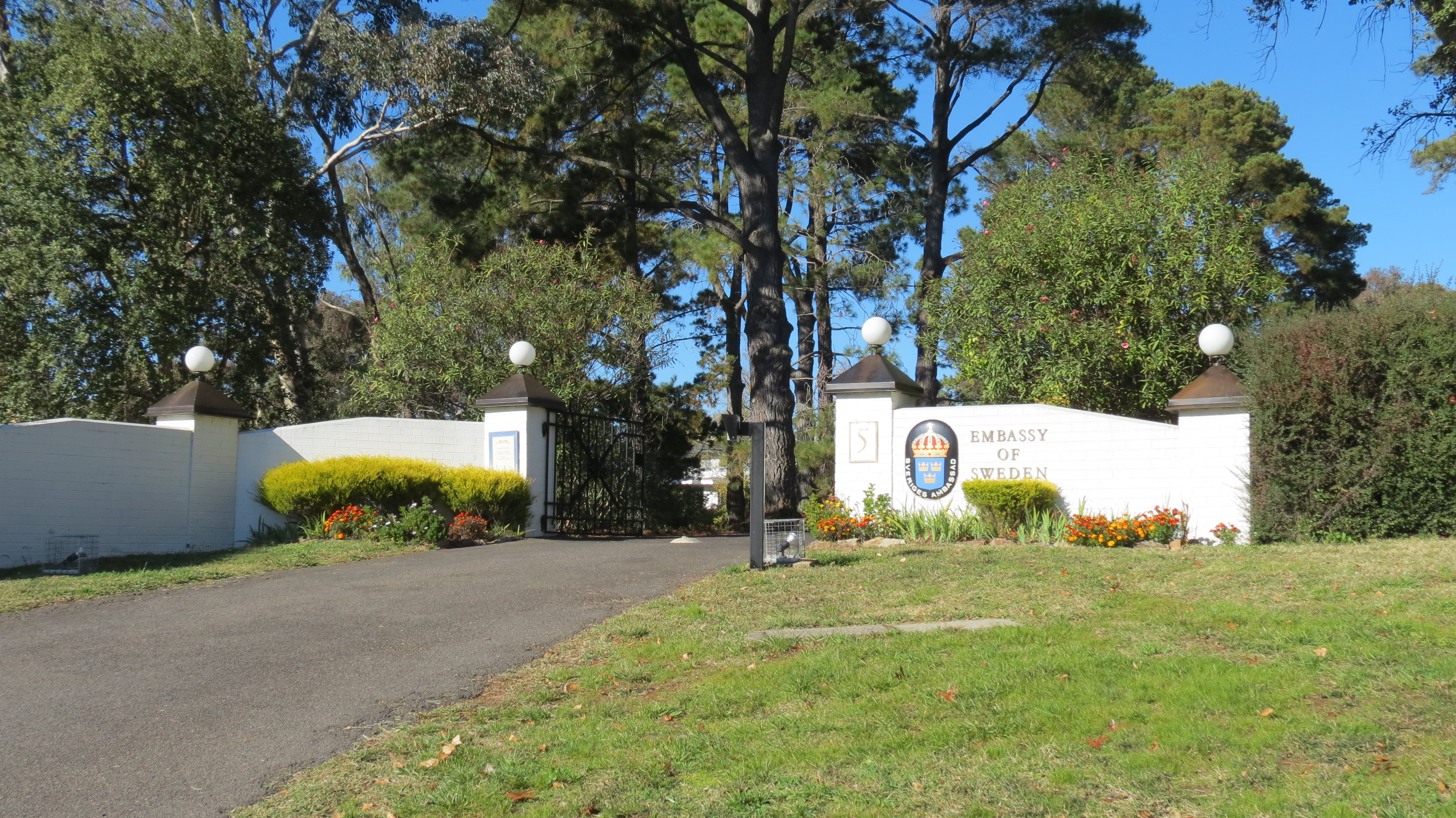
Entrance

== See also ==
- Australia–Sweden relations
