= Australia–Sweden relations =

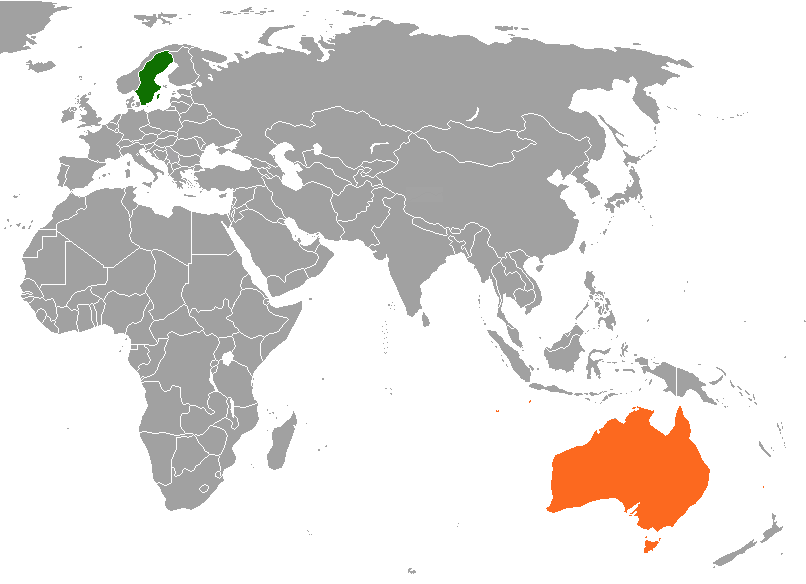

- Sweden: Australia

Foreign relations exist between Australia and Sweden. Australia has an embassy in Stockholm. Sweden has an embassy in Canberra as well as honorary consulates in Sydney, Adelaide, Brisbane, Cairns, Darwin, Hobart, Melbourne and Perth.

== Overview ==
Monthly value of Australian merchandise exports to Sweden (A$ millions) since 1988

Monthly value of Swedish merchandise exports to Australia (A$ millions) since 1988

The relationship between Australia and Sweden is strong, particularly in the areas of trade and education services. In 2007, the two way merchandise trade between both countries totalled A$2.6 billion. According to the Swedish Trade Council, Australia's total exports to Sweden increased by more than 27% to approximately A$445m in 2008 while Australia's imports from Sweden increased by more than 7.5% to approximately A$2.5bn. More than 150 Swedish companies have an Australian subsidiary. Both countries also have a Double Taxation Agreement, as well as a bilateral Working Holiday Maker Arrangement.

On the friendship between Australia and Sweden, King of Sweden Carl XVI Gustaf said that both countries "are like-minded in many ways. It is hard to imagine two countries so far apart and geographically different. Still we have close bonds and enjoy fruitful cooperation".

== Resident diplomatic missions ==
- Australia has an embassy in Stockholm.
- Sweden has an embassy in Canberra.
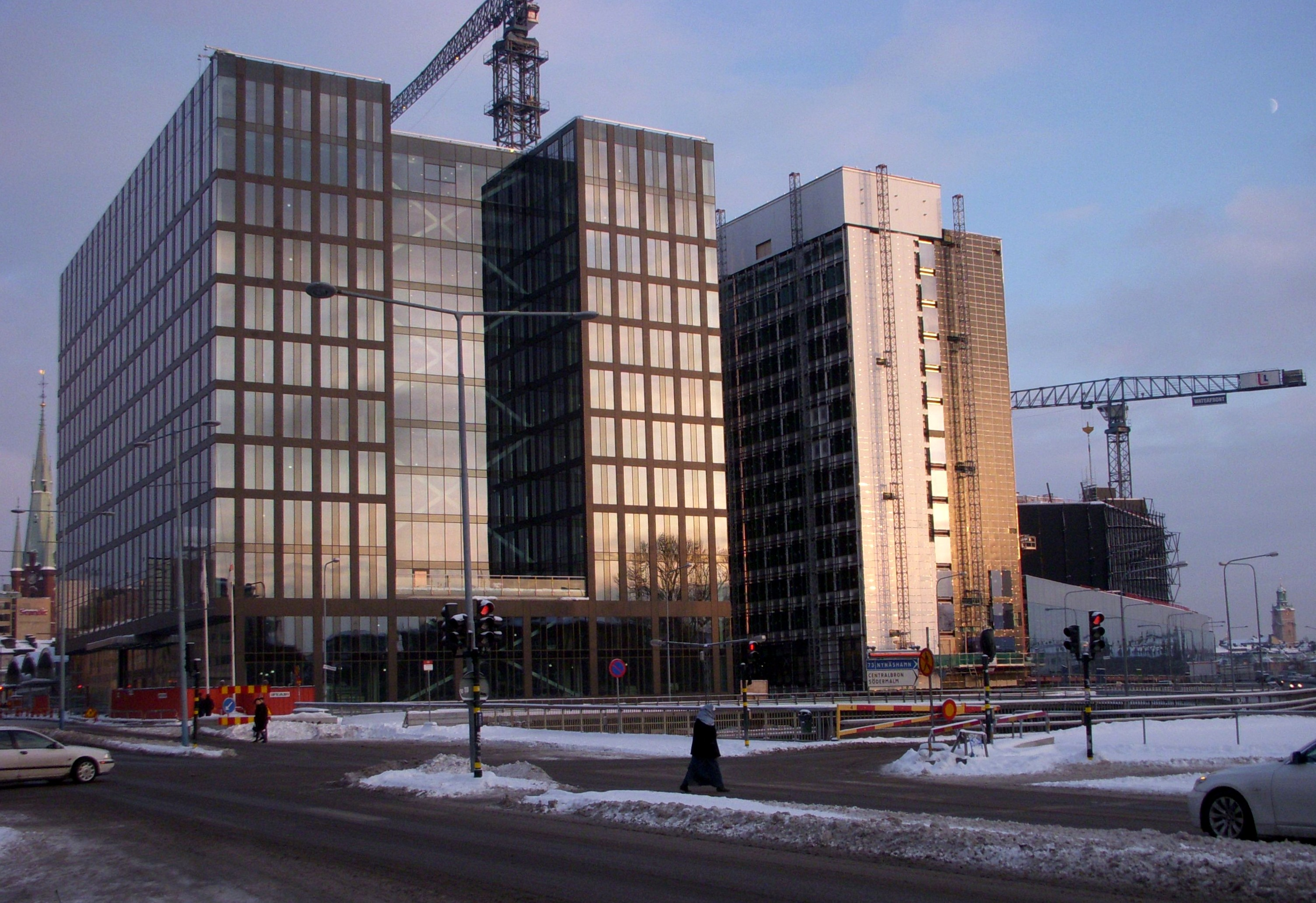
Embassy of Australia in Stockholm

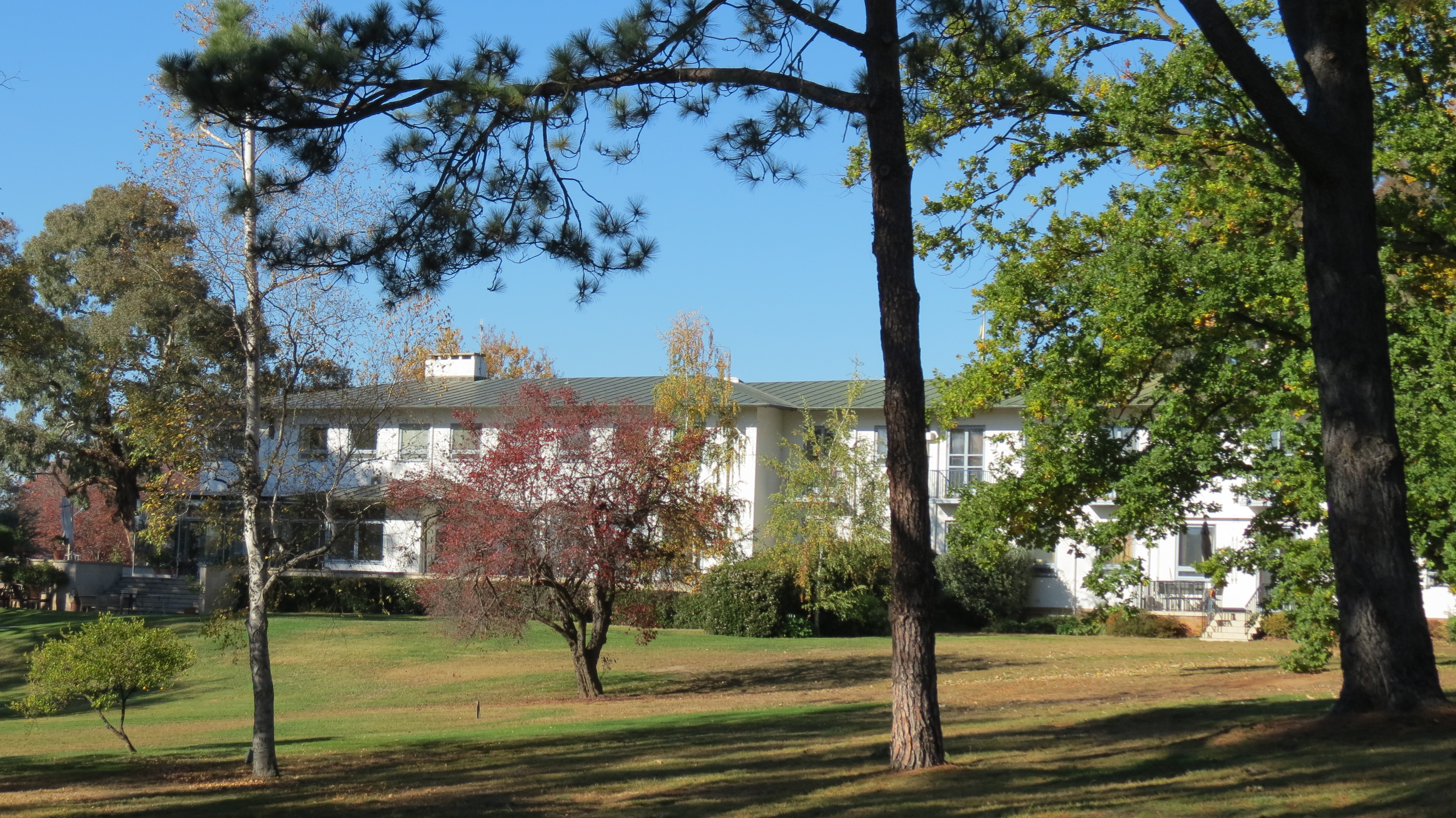
Embassy of Sweden in Canberra

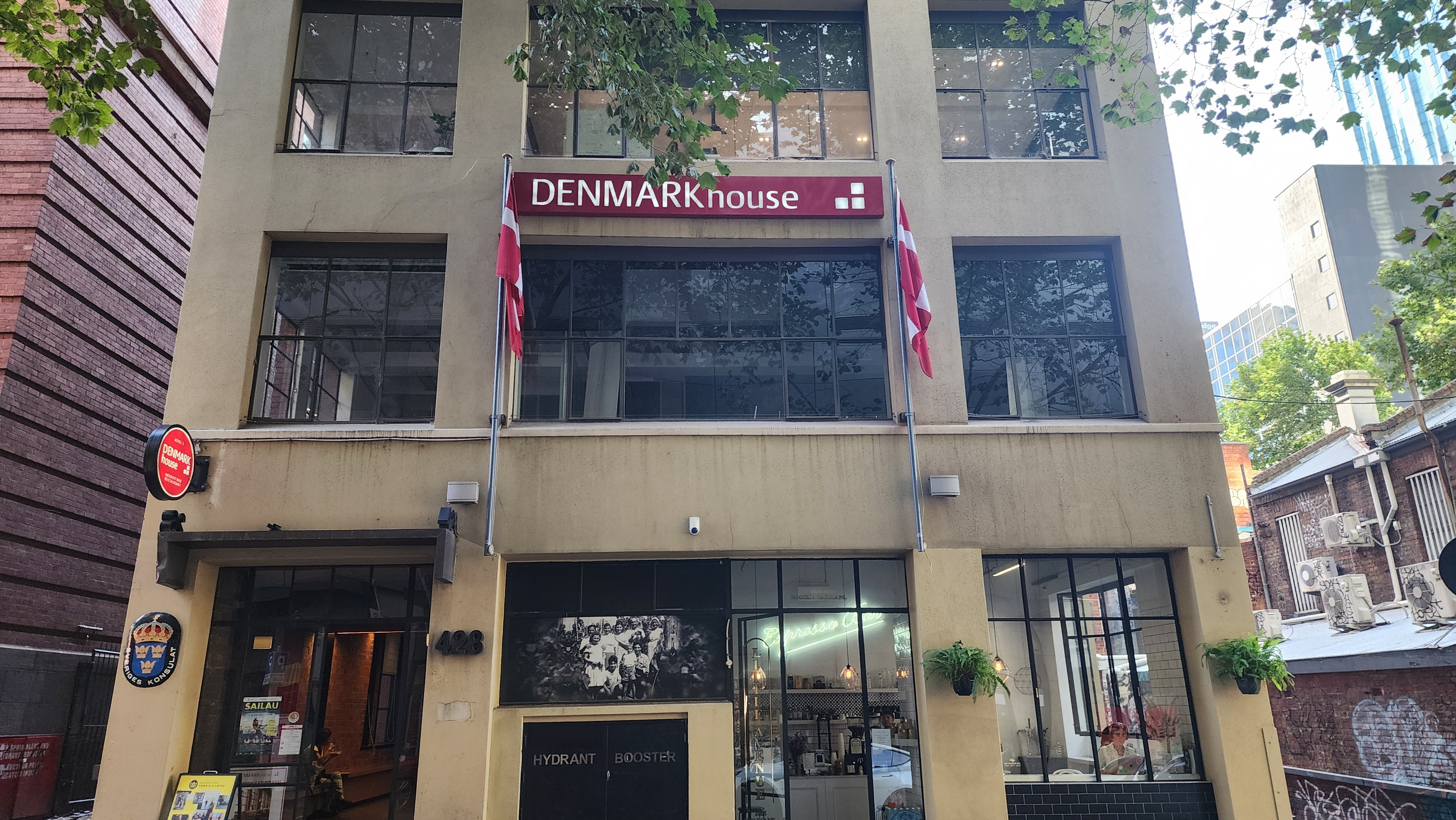
Sweden Consulate in Melbourne

== See also ==
- Foreign relations of Australia
- Foreign relations of Sweden
