= 2010 Copenhagen terror plot =

(2010) Copenhagen Plot: Denmark

Coordinates: 55.7193°N 12.4711°E

- Location: Copenhagen, Denmark
- Date: 29 December 2010
- Target: Jyllands-Posten, Copenhagen
- Attack type: "Mumbai-style"
- Weapon: machine guns
- Deaths: 0
- Injuries: 0

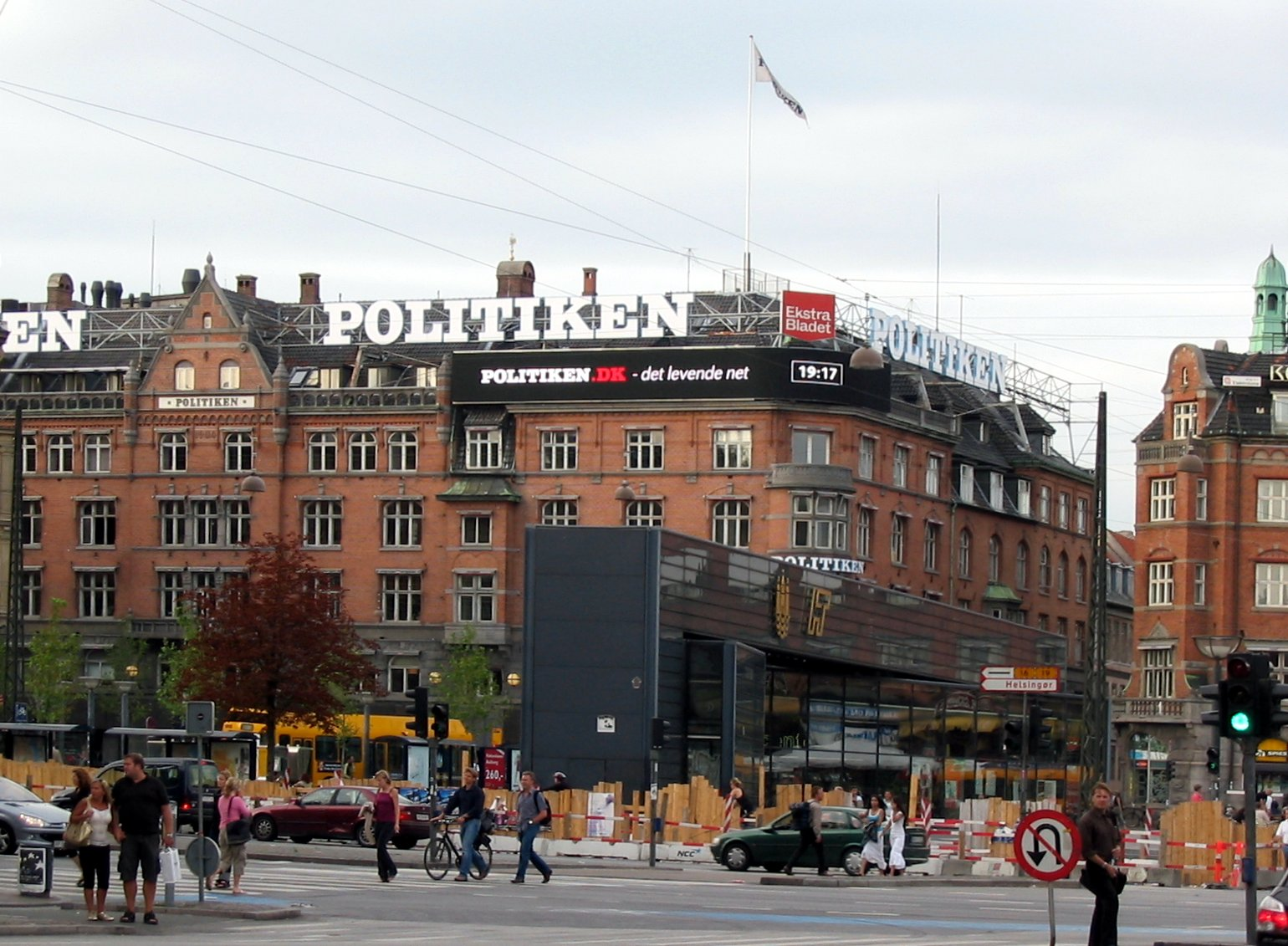
The offices of the Danish newspaper Politiken in Copenhagen

The 2010 Copenhagen terror plot was a terrorist plot against Jyllands-Posten, the publisher of the controversial cartoons of Muhammad in 2005.

== Background ==
In December the most serious terror operation ever uncovered in Denmark before the 2015 Copenhagen shootings was thwarted by a successful cooperation between security services in Denmark and Sweden. Police, accompanied by bomb experts, conducted several raids and detained five men, who were described as militant Islamists. Automatic weapons, together with ammunition and silencers, were seized by the police. Plastic strips to use as handcuffs were also found.

The terrorists allegedly plotted to conduct a "Mumbai-style" attack on Jyllands-Posten to avenge the 2005 publishing of the cartoons portraying Muhammad as a terrorist.

== Investigation ==
As suspects they had been under surveillance for an extended period of time and the arrests were the result of a long investigation. The group travelled to Copenhagen 27 December 2010, Zalouti changed his mind on the way to Denmark and returned to Järfälla. Police arrested the group 28 December 2010 in Copenhagen and Zalouti was arrested on the same day in Sweden.

== Convictions ==
The men were charged with attempted terrorism and unlawful possession of weapons (a machine gun with silencer, a pistol and more than 100 cartridges). On 4 June 2012 they were convicted and sentenced to 12 years in prison.

The convicted were transferred to a prison in Sweden, Saltviksanstalten in Härnösand which has the highest security level.

=== Munir Awad ===
Munir Awad, 29, is a Lebanese-born Swedish national. He received a sentence of 12 years in prison. He was silent during the trial (Danish: Byret), but told his version of events before the appeal court (Danish: Landsret). The state prosecutor demanded a 14-year sentence, while a lay judge recommended a 10-year sentence. The judges and the other lay judges decided on a sentence of 12 years.

While in prison he attempted to contact others by connecting other participants to a phone call with his wife, thereby attempting to communicate with people he was forbidden to contact. According to the Swedish Prison and Probation Service, Awad has a network of contacts among radicalized individuals. He was religiously active in the prison and attempted to radicalize inmates.

Munir Awad was previously arrested in Pakistan in 2009 on suspicions of terrorism, together with Mehdi Ghezali, a former Guantanamo-detainee. Munir Awad is the son-in-law of Helena Benaouda, head of the Muslim Council of Sweden. This led some Swedish newspaper editors to question Benaouda's role as head of one of the country's largest Muslim organization. The suspects' various ties to the Stockholm Grand Mosque also stirred up some media attention. Stockholm mosque is a chapter of the Islamic Association of Sweden.

In 2013 he was transferred to Saltvik prison after his appeal to have his conviction overturned in a Danish court was dismissed. Awad was the only one to appeal his conviction.

=== Others ===
- Omar Abdalla Aboelazm, 30, Swedish-Egyptian origin who had a previous conviction for sexual assault. While detained in Denmark he was suspected of planning new attacks because police found instructions for building weapons in his cell along with plans of public places. After being transferred to a Swedish prison, he received a number of warnings for refusing to work and disorderly conduct.
- Mounir Dhari, 44, Tunisian national. While incarcerated, Dhari attempted to radicalize his fellow inmates. He was also noted for disorderly conduct by issuing loud calls to prayer. He received several warnings for death threats against fellow inmates and prison staff. Among those were "I swear I shall kill you, by Allah" to a fellow inmate along with "fucking homosexual" and "I am going to fuck you". Dhari told his neighbours that he was an employee at Stockholm mosque, a position he received via the Swedish Public Employment Service, though mosque leadership denied knowing who he was, since so many are sent to the mosque by both the Prison and Probation Service and the employment service. Dhari applied several times to be transferred to a prison nearer to Stockholm but authorities refused due to the risk of escape.
- Sahbi Zalouti, 37, Tunisian origin, a Swedish national, was arrested in Järfälla, Sweden. Zalouti received several warnings from prison authorities for disorderly conduct, threats and violence and refusing to work. As a consequence he has at times been put in isolation.
- NN, 26, Iraqi - arrested in Greve, was later released without charge.

Sahbi Zalouti had also been previously arrested in Pakistan in 2009 on suspicions of terrorism, roughly at the same time as Munir Awad though not together.

== Reactions ==
- Danish Prime Minister Lars Løkke Rasmussen expressed his dismay at the fact that concrete plans for a group terrorist attack may have happened in the country. He stressed that, regardless of the case, they would not allow terrorism to endanger the values of their open society, in particular democracy and freedom of expression.
- Abd al Haqq Kielan, the imam at the Sabirin Mosque in Eskilstuna said in an interview that "These people do things that are explicitly forbidden in Islam. They make our religion to appear cruel and brutal." The imam also said that "the prophet is very clear on this: A Muslim must not be disloyal to the country he lives in, much less the country that received him, gave him a visa, residence permit and protection when you most needed it."

== See also ==
- Islamic terrorism
- Terrorism in Denmark
- Glostrup Terrorists Case
- Vollsmose terrorists
- Mohamad Al-Khaled Samha
- German Terror Plot 9/07
- 2010 Stockholm bombings
- 2010 Norway terror plot
