= List of ambassadors of Sweden to Ireland =

Ambassador of Sweden to Ireland
- Lesser coat of arms of the Kingdom of Sweden
- Incumbent; Inger Buxton since August 2026
- Ministry for Foreign Affairs; Swedish Embassy, Dublin
- Style: His or Her Excellency (formal); Mr. or Madam Ambassador (informal)
- Reports to: Minister for Foreign Affairs
- Seat: Dublin, Ireland
- Appointer: Government of Sweden
- Term length: No fixed term
- Formation: 1946
- First holder: Oscar Thorsing
- Website: Swedish Embassy, Dublin

The Ambassador of Sweden to Ireland (known formally as the Ambassador of the Kingdom of Sweden to the Republic of Ireland) is the official representative of the government of Sweden to the president of Ireland and government of Ireland.

== History ==
In January 1946, it was decided that the consulship in Dublin would be changed to a position of legation counsellor, and the holder of the position was given the status of chargé d'affaires en pied. In May 1946, the head of the Press Department of the Ministry for Foreign Affairs, Director Oscar Thorsing, was appointed as chargé d'affaires in Dublin, effective 1 July, with the title of minister plenipotentiary.

In May 1951, he was appointed as Sweden's first envoy there. On 7 June 1951, he presented his letter of credence to Prime Minister John A. Costello. During an earlier official visit, he had presented them to President Seán T. O'Kelly.

In October 1959, an agreement was reached between the Swedish and Irish governments on the mutual elevation of the respective countries' legations to embassies. The diplomatic rank was thereafter changed to ambassador instead of envoy extraordinary and minister plenipotentiary.

== List of representatives ==
Name	Period	Title	Notes	Presented credentials	Ref
Nils Jaenson	January 1946 – 30 June 1946	Chargé d'affaires en pied	Consul general (1937–46) and legation councillor (1946).		
Oscar Thorsing	1 July 1946 – 1951	Chargé d'affaires and minister plenipotentiary			
Oscar Thorsing	1951–1952	Envoy extraordinary and minister plenipotentiary			
Folke Wennerberg	1952–1958	Envoy extraordinary and minister plenipotentiary			
Leif Öhrvall	1958 – October 1959	Envoy extraordinary and minister plenipotentiary			
Leif Öhrvall	October 1959 – 1963	Ambassador			
Nils-Eric Ekblad	1963–1967	Ambassador			
Eyvind Bratt	1967–1973	Ambassador			
Bo Järnstedt	1973–1977	Ambassador			
Lennart Myrsten	1977–1982	Ambassador			
Gustaf Hamilton af Hageby	1982–1987	Ambassador			
Ilmar Bekeris	1987 – 5 November 1988	Ambassador	Died in office.		
Margareta Hegardt	1989–1993	Ambassador			
Per Jödahl	1993–1997	Ambassador			
Peter Osvald	1997–2002	Ambassador			
Nils Daag	2002–2006	Ambassador			
Claes Ljungdahl	2007–2010	Ambassador			
Elisabet Borsiin Bonnier	2010–2014	Ambassador	Resident in Stockholm		
Ulrika Sundberg	October 2014 – 2016	Ambassador	Resident in Stockholm	15 October 2014	
Anna Brandt	September 2016 – 2018	Ambassador	Resident in Stockholm	13 October 2016	
Lars Wahlund	1 September 2018 – 2021	Ambassador	Resident in Stockholm	17 January 2019	
Magnus Rydén	2021–2023	Ambassador	Resident in Stockholm	24 November 2021	
Lina van der Weyden	January 2024 – 2026	Ambassador		23 January 2024	
Inger Buxton	August 2026 – present	Ambassador			

== Gallery ==
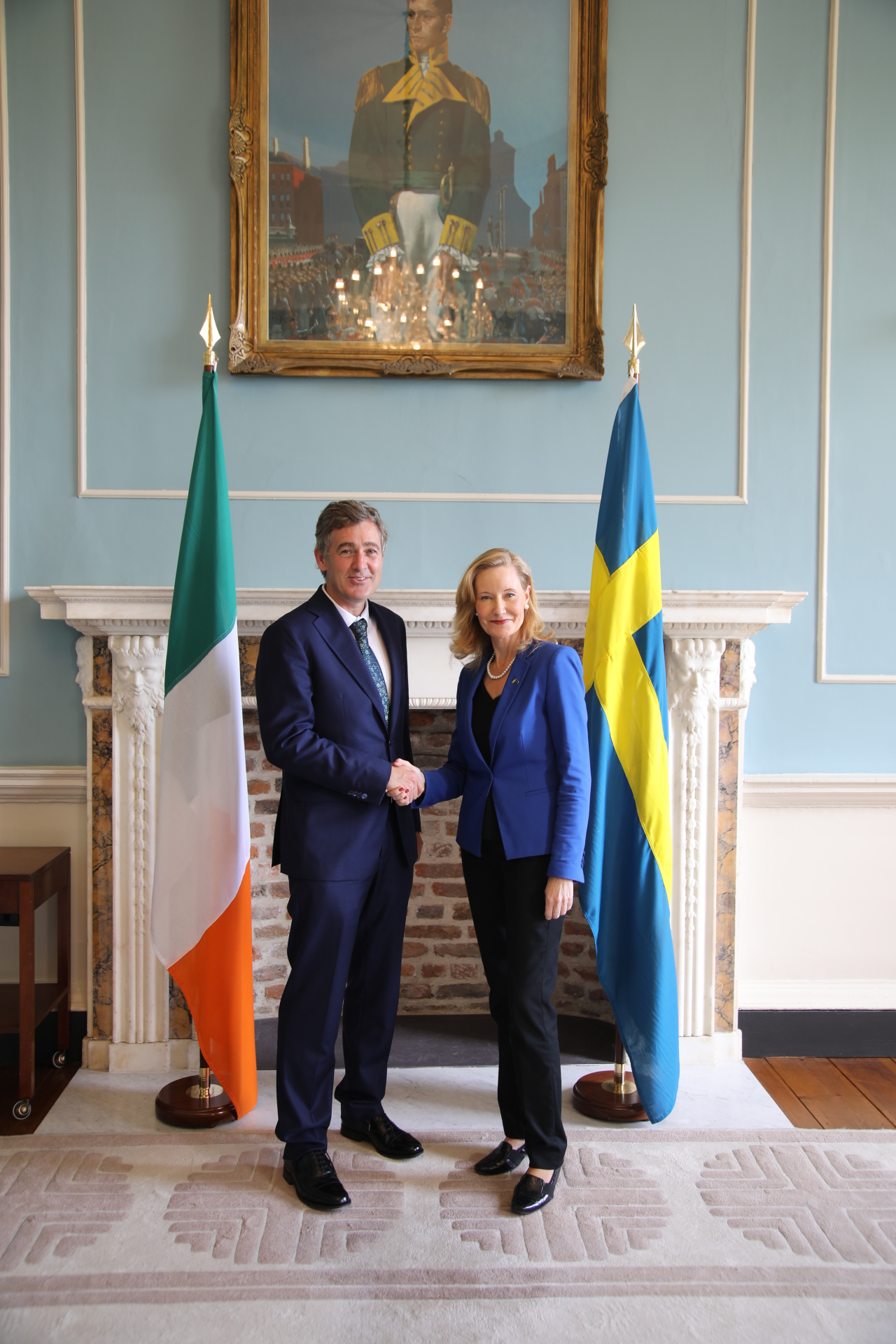
Ambassador Lina van der Weyden (2024–present) and Senator Mark Daly.

== See also ==
- Ireland–Sweden relations
- Embassy of Sweden, Dublin
