= Kielan =

Kielan is a surname. Notable people with the surname include:

- Abd al Haqq Kielan (born 1941), Swedish Muslim cleric
- Urszula Kielan (born 1960), Polish high jumper
- Zofia Kielan-Jaworowska (1925–2015), Polish paleobiologist
