= Göran Lindberg =

Swedish rapist and police chief

- Born: 25 April 1946 (age 80); Uppsala, Sweden
- Occupation: former policeman
- Children: 2
- Status: Released
- Convictions: Multiple instances of rape (including child rape) and other sex offenses
- Penalty: 6 years imprisonment

Karl Göran Gustav Lindberg (born 25 April 1946, in Uppsala) is a Swedish convicted serial rapist and a former police chief. He effectively served 2/3rd of a six-year prison sentence in Saltvik Prison for numerous sex crimes.

== Career in the police ==
He completed his law degree in 1972, and served as rector of the Swedish National Police Academy 1989–1997, and as police commissioner in Uppsala County 1997–2006. After stepping down as police commissioner, he was an adviser on gender equality and sexual harassment to the National Police Directorate.

== Criminal conviction ==
He was arrested on 25 January 2010 and charged with multiple sex offenses, including the attempted rape of a 14-year-old child. Initially, media reporting alleged that Lindberg was implicated in a network of prominent men abusing women and children, but the police denied finding anything substantiating those allegations. Later interviews with victims reiterated the network allegations. He was subsequently also charged with raping several other women, and of procuring. On 30 July 2010, he was convicted of several sex offenses, including rape, and sentenced to 6.5 years in prison by the Södertörn District Court. The High Court reduced his sentence to 6 years, and the Supreme Court rejected his appeal. He served his sentence in Saltvik Prison.

He was released in late January 2014 after serving four years in prison.
