= Erik Gandini =

Film director

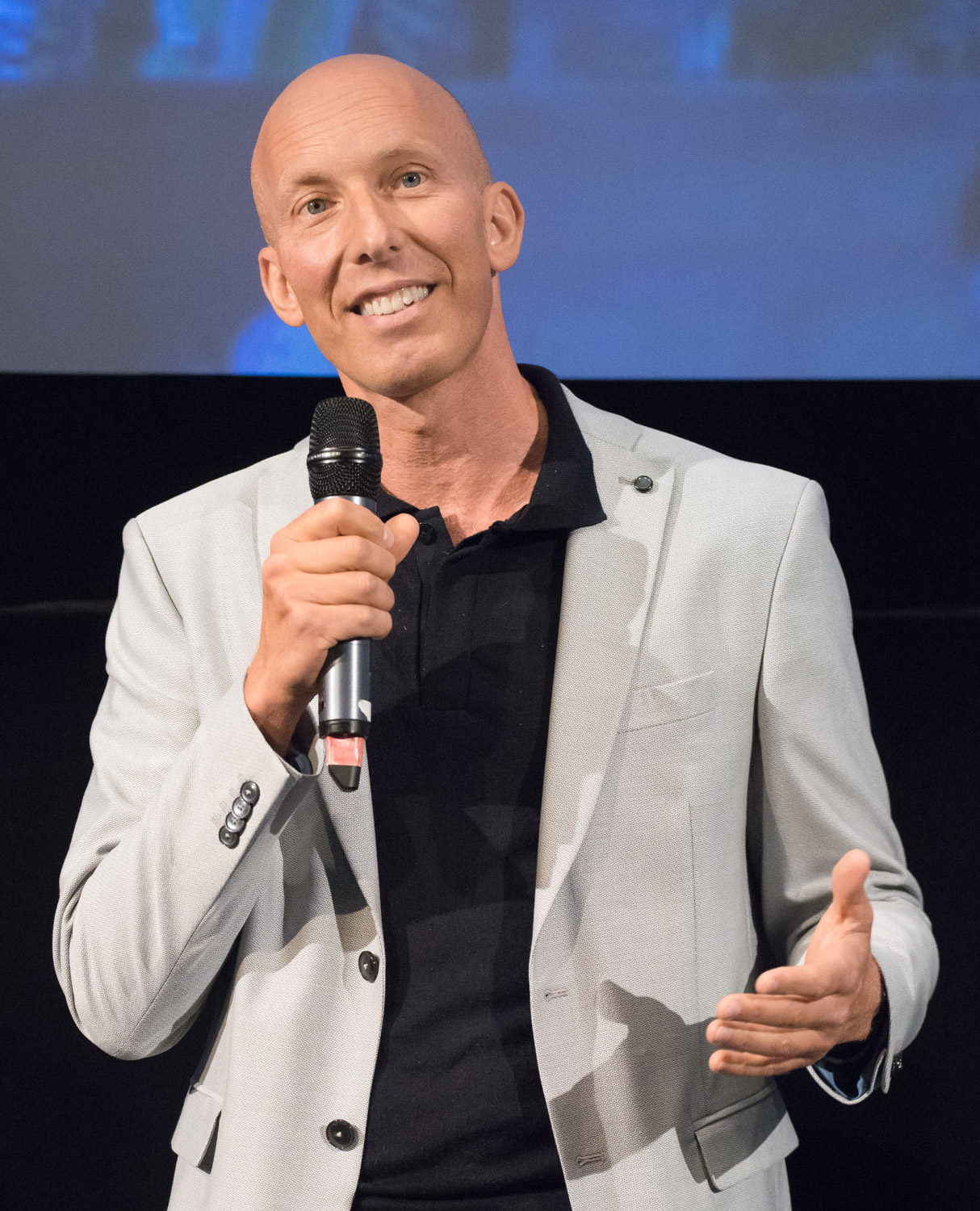
- Erik Gandini
- Born: 14 August 1967 (age 59); Bergamo, Italy
- Occupations: Director, producer, professor of documentary film
- Years active: 1994–present

Erik Walter Gandini (born 14 August 1967) is an Italian-Swedish film director, writer, producer and professor of documentary film at Stockholm University of the Arts.

His film The Swedish Theory of Love premiered at the 2015 Stockholm International Film Festival.

== Early life ==
Erik Gandini moved to Sweden at age 19 to attend film school. After his studies at Biskops Arnö and having completed a master's degree in film science at Stockholm University, he started working as a documentary filmmaker.

In 1994, Gandini adventured with a fake letter of recommendation from a small local Swedish TV broadcaster to the besieged city of Sarajevo where he directed and produced his first documentary Raja Sarajevo for Sveriges Television. The film, shot on a small Hi-8 camera by cinematographer Martina Iverus, followed four young friends trying to survive the brutality of the siege. Raja Sarajevo was Gandini's international breakthrough and was selected at Berlin International Film Festival, at IDFA, Cinema du Reél in Paris.

In 2000, Erik Gandini founded the Stockholm-based film production company ATMO, together with Tarik Saleh, Lars Rodvald and Kristina Åberg. In 2013 Gandini joined film production company Fasad, working alongside Jesper Kurlandsky, Jesper Ganslandt and Juan Libossart.

== Early Documentaries ==
=== Raja Sarajevo ===
Raja Sarajevo from 1994 (Raja means 'group of friends' in Bosnian) starred i.a. Enes Zlatar, leader of rock band Sikter and international artist Nebojsa Seric Soba, who at the time was a part-time art student and part-time soldier in the Bosnian army. In 1996, Erik Gandini shot a second documentary about the Balkan War, Not without Prijedor, about four young Bosnian refugees in Sweden who decided to return to their country to join the war. The same year he became part of a cult TV show on Swedish TV, ELBYL, where he met with Tarik Saleh.

His film Amerasians-the 100.000 children of the vietnam war from 1998 about the children of American soldiers and Vietnamese women was awarded the Silver Spire at the 1999 San Francisco International Film Festival

=== Sacrificio - Who Betrayed Che Guevara? ===
In 2001, Gandini co-directed with Tarik Saleh the documentary film Sacrificio - Who Betrayed Che Guevara?. The film centers around Ciro Bustos, Che Guevara's Argentinian lieutenant and the person who more than other has been blamed in history books as guilty of Che's death.

When captured in Bolivia, Bustos drew Ches portraits of Che Guevara and his guerrillas for the Bolivian army. Providing his interrogators with drawings framed Bustos as a traitor by historians but was according to his version part of a misleading strategy adopted under interrogation. After living in Sweden in silence for some thirty years, Sacrificio was the first documentary he took part in.

Sacrificio explores Busto's version of an event turned into a legend, finding the surviving protagonists of Che Guevara's death and raising questions about how history has been written. Sacrificio stars several of the main characters surrounding the capture and killing of the Argentinian revolutionary leader, including former CIA agent Felix Rodriguez, former Bolivian General Gary Prado and Che Guevara's executioner Mario Teran.

When released in 2001, Sacrificio sparked an international debate questioning the mystified approach to Che Guevara's death and shed new light on the role played by French intellectual Régis Debray.

== Creative documentary ==
=== Surplus - Terrorized into Being Consumers ===
Surplus: Terrorized into Being Consumers from 2003 is a non-fiction musical odyssey about the dysfunctional sides of consumer culture, shot in Sweden, USA, China, India, Cuba, Hungary and Italy over a three-year period. Surplus marked the start of a strong co-operation with composer-editor Johan Söderberg. Surplus premiered in competition at the largest documentary film festival IDFA in Amsterdam in 2003 where it won the prestigious Silver Wolf Award.

Surplus's innovative style is the product of a method that Gandini came to adopts as a very personal approach to documentary film, "the freest, cheapest way for a person to express themselves cinematically". Although his films deal with current social issues they are far from traditional documentaries. They are "creative documentaries" relying on a "show, don't tell" method, to give the viewer an experience of the world rather than an interpretation of it, making a powerful use of cinematography, music and editing to create an immersive discourse.

=== Gitmo ===
Gitmo – The New Rules of War is a documentary about the Guantanamo Bay detention camp by Erik Gandini and Tarik Saleh. The film features interviews with Janis Karpinski, Mehdi Ghezali and Geoffrey Miller, among others. Gitmo premiered at IDFA in 2005, and reached mainstream theaters in Sweden on February 10, 2006. It won a Jury award as best documentary at the 2006 Seattle International Film Festival,

=== Videocracy ===
The 2009 feature-length documentary Videocracy that shot Gandini into international fame, explores how Italy transformed culturally and morally under the dominance of Silvio Berlusconi. When it premiered at the Venice International Film Festival, its trailer was banned by Italian state broadcaster RAI, stirring an international controversy. When widely released in theaters across Italy, it climbed to the fourth position on the Italian Box Office the first weekend.

Videocracy was voted best documentary film at the Toronto International Film Festival by a critics poll conducted by Indy Wire and chosen as one of the best documentaries in 2010 by The Guardian top critic Peter Bradshaw.

=== "The Evilness of Banality" ===
To explain the cultural phenomenon of Berlusconismo, Erik Gandini coined the expression "The Evilness of Banality", thus paraphrasing Hannah Arendt's banality of evil.

In 2010, Erik Gandini was appointed visiting professor at Karlstad University, Global Media Studies. Besides his professional career as a director and producer, Gandini lectures extensively about film and the power of modern ideas in Sweden, Italy and around the world.

=== The Swedish Theory of Love ===
The documentary The Swedish Theory of Love is Gandini's exploration of the individualistic aspects of a Scandinavian ideology of personal independence, more broadly of modern society. The film portrays a near future scenario where the Swedes are suffering from an epidemic of loneliness. Gandini was inspired by his own 'split-life' as an Italian Swede. The title of the movie is derived from the book Is the Swede human?, written by the Swedish historians Henrik Berggren och Lars Trägårdh.

The movie premiered internationally in competition at CPH DO and IDFA in the Master section, was nominated for Best Documentary at the Stockholm Film Festival in 2015 and was released theatrically in Italy, Spain, Poland, Norway and The Netherlands. It has become a classic cinematic reference in several EU countries like Sweden, Italy, Spain and Poland whenever individualism and loneliness are discussed in relation to a set of values typical of modernity.

=== The Rebel Surgeon ===
The film is a portrait of senior Danish surgeon Erik Erichsen who loses his passion for his job despite being the most meaningful profession in the world. According to Erichsen due to excessive bureaucracy in the Swedish health care system. Searching for new meaning he moves to Ethiopia, the home country of his wife since 40 years Sennait Erichsen. With no tools nor resources he discovers purpose in a remote hospital in the village of Aira, where stoicism and acceptance of faith among local population reminds him of the fallibility of the west. Selected in the Master section of IDFA 2017, The Rebel Surgeon scored top ten among audience favourites.

=== After Work ===
After Work premiered in the main competition at the 2023 CPH:DOX, where it became the most-watched film on the festival’s on-demand platform. The documentary explores the culture of work in the 21st century, asking what happens to human identity and purpose when technology surpasses human labor. As automation advances, Gandini invites viewers to consider a provocative question: are we ready for a life with an excess of time — perhaps even a work-free existence?

Filmed across four continents, the film portrays contrasting lives: from those consumed entirely by work to others immersed in leisure. Through these stories, After Work opens an existential inquiry into how we choose to spend our finite time on earth.

A Swedish–Italian–Norwegian co-production, the film was selected for major international festivals including Hot Docs, Visions du Réel, and One World, and has enjoyed extensive global distribution through Cat&Docs. It has been released in 17 territories — including Amazon Prime in Italy — with cinema distribution in six countries and an estimated audience of over one million viewers.

Critics have praised the film’s cinematic and intellectual ambition, as its emphatic treatment of its characters: Variety called it a “stunningly cinematic doc,” Modern Times Review described it as “elegantly made,” while Politiken lauded it as “incredibly skillfully performed by Gandini, elegant in form and convincingly formulated.” Business Doc Europe praised its “great artistic courage,” and What’s in a Scene wrote that After Work “hits the right notes between philosophically interesting and relatable.”

== Recognitions ==
Erik Gandini is the winner of the 2012 Maj Zetterling award. The prize of 200,000SEK was granted by the Swedish Art Council for his 'innovation of cinematic language within the documentary genre' Gandini was also nominated Swedish producer of the year in 2010, competing for the Lorens Award

== As producer ==
=== The Raft ===
As a producer Gandini is behind The Raft by director Marcus Lindéen winner of the main competition at CPH DOX in 2018 and also Prix Europa in 2019.

== Professor at Stockholm University of the Arts ==
=== The Future Through The Present and the film After Work ===
Since 2016 Gandini is a professor of Documentary Film at Stockholm University of the Arts where he teaches Creative Documentary. In parallel he is leading a research project about how non-fiction film making can grasp the big challenges of the future. The project, entitled The Future Through the Present, started in collaboration with prominent scholar/author Roland Paulsen and film professor/director Jyoti Mistry. In 2021 it was granted three years funding by The Swedish Research Council, Vetenskapsrådet and once completed it was selected in competition with many other for further funding for its dissemination.

== Personal life ==
Gandini lives in Stockholm, Sweden and Italy and has three children.

== Awards ==
Awards
| Year | Result | Festival | Film |
|---|---|---|---|
| 2024 | Special Mention | Knowlton International Film Festival | After Work |
| 2023 | Main International Competition | CPH DOX | After Work |
| 2017 | Audience Award | Krakow Int. Film Festival | The Rebel Surgeon |
| 2015 | Nominated Best Documentary | Stockholm Film Festival | The Swedish Theory of Love |
| 2015 | Nominated Best Documentary | CPH DOX | The Swedish Theory of Love |
| 2009 | Special Jury Prize | Sheffield Film Festival | Videocracy |
| 2009 | Nomination | Swedish Guldbagge | Videocracy |
| 2006 | First Prize | Seattle Int. Film Festival | Gitmo |
| 2006 | Special Jury Mention | Miami Int. Film Festival | Gitmo |
| 2004 | Audience Award | Vila do Conde International Film Festival, Portugal | Surplus |
| 2003 | First prize, Silver Wolf | IDFA Amsterdam | Surplus |
| 2003 | International Festival Environmental Film, FICA, Brazil | First Prize | Surplus |
| 2003 | Nominated | Swedish Gulbagge | Surplus |
| 2001 | First Prize | Its all True Doc, Film Festival | Sacrificio |
| 2001 | Best non Latin American documentary | Havana Film Festival | Sacrificio |
| 2001 | Best use of music and sound | One World Film Festival | Sacrificio |
| 2001 | First Prize | Oporto International Film Festival | Sacrificio |

The Future Through The Present-research project
