= Walter Wojdakowski =

United States Army general

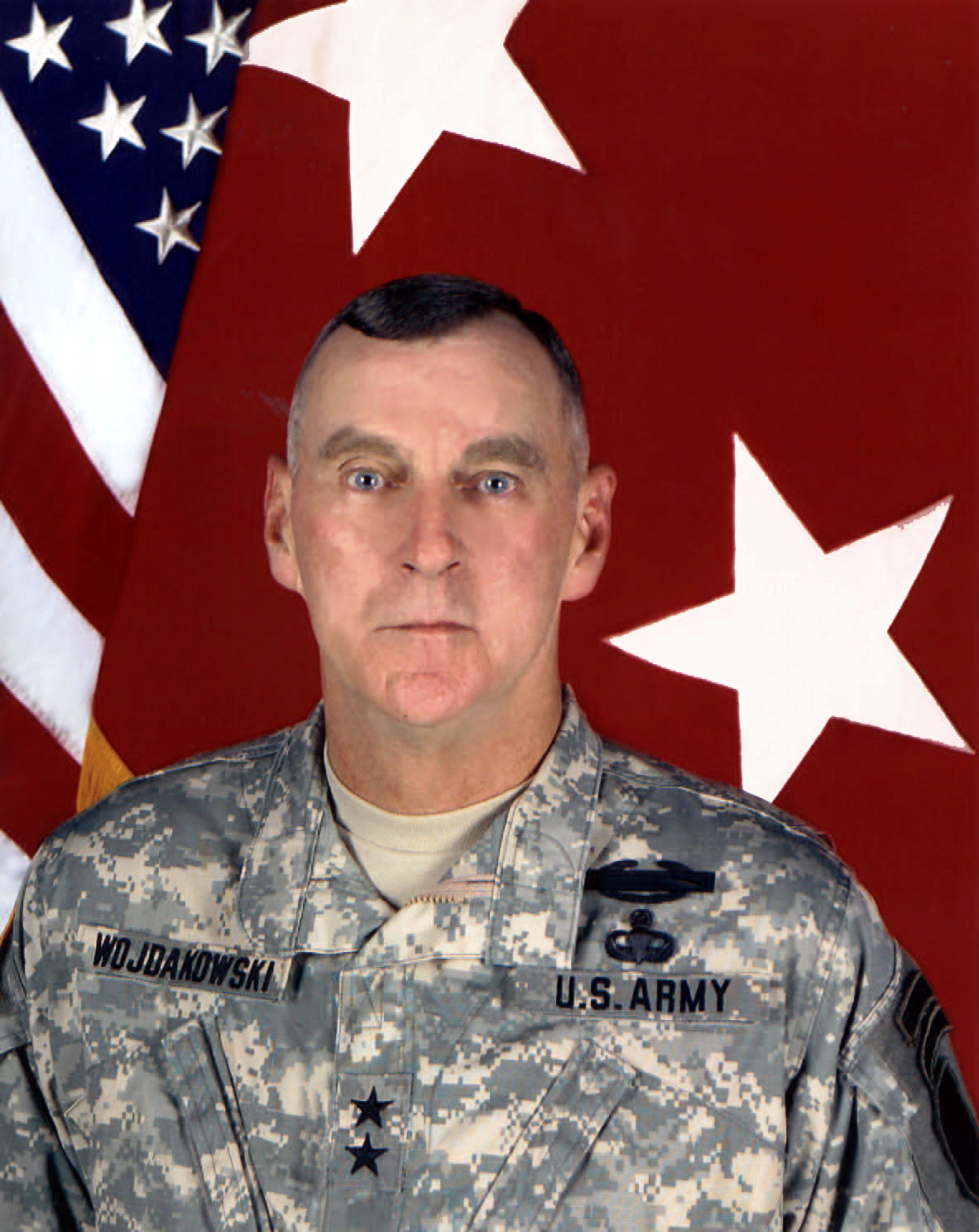
- Born: March 29, 1950; Elgin, Illinois
- Military career
- Allegiance: United States of America
- Branch: United States Army
- Service years: 1972–2008
- Rank: Major General
- Conflicts: Operation Desert Storm
- Awards: Silver Star; Legion of Merit (3); Bronze Star

Walter Wojdakowski (born March 29, 1950) is a retired United States Army Major General. He held a number of high positions within the military, including his last post as Commanding General of Fort Benning.

== Military career ==
=== Education ===
Wojdakowski graduated from the United States Military Academy at West Point in 1972. He has a Bachelor of Science and a Master of Business Administration from the University of Alaska and a Master of Military Arts and Sciences from the U.S. Army Command and General Staff College. He is a member of the Phi Kappa Phi honor society. His military education includes the Infantry Officer Basic and Advanced Courses, the Command and General Staff College, the School of Advanced Military Studies, and the Army War College.

=== Service ===
Wojdakowski served in company grade officer positions as a Platoon Leader, Scout Platoon Leader, Executive Officer, Ranger Instructor and Commander at Fort Lewis and at the Army Mountain Ranger Camp. He also was an Assistant Professor of Military Science at the University of Alaska Fairbanks. As a field grade officer, he served as a Brigade S-3, Battalion Executive Officer and Chief, Tactical Operations III Corps G-3 at Fort Hood, Texas. He commanded the 3rd Battalion, 41st Infantry Regiment, Tiger Brigade, 2nd Armored Division at Fort Hood and in Desert Storm/Desert Shield from 1989 to 1991. He was then assigned as the Senior Infantry Task Force Combat Trainer at the National Training Center, Fort Irwin, California. He attended the U.S. Army War College, Carlisle Barracks, Pennsylvania and commanded the 11th Infantry Regiment at Ft Benning, Georgia from July 1993 to July 1995. Wojdakowski's next assignment was as the Director of Training, 7th Army Training Command, USAREUR and he became the Commander, Operations Group, Combat Maneuver Training Center at the Hohenfels Training Area, Germany on 1 May 1996. Wojdakowski assumed the duties of Assistant Commandant of the Infantry School and Deputy Commanding General, Fort Benning, on 21 January 1997. In September 1998 he became Chief, Office of Military Cooperation, Kuwait at the U.S. Embassy in Kuwait City, Kuwait. He assumed duties as the ADC, 24th Infantry Division (Mech) (Fwd) and Deputy Commanding General (DCG), 1st U.S. Army on 17 August 2000. In September 2002 he assumed the position of DCG V Corps. He was later named DCG of the former Combined Joint Task Force 7, later succeeded by Multi-National Force-Iraq and Multi-National Corps-Iraq. Wojdakowski here served as top deputy to Lt. Gen. Ricardo S. Sanchez, the force commander. After this post, he was eventually named Commanding General of Ft. Benning.

=== Awards and decorations ===
Combat Infantryman Badge
Expert Infantryman Badge
Master Parachutist Badge
Ranger Tab

Silver Star
Defense Superior Service Medal
Legion of Merit with two oak leaf clusters
Bronze Star
Meritorious Service Medal with two oak leaf clusters
Army Commendation Medal with two oak leaf clusters
Navy and Marine Corps Commendation Medal
Army Achievement Medal with oak leaf cluster

=== Abu Ghraib ===
Along with other military and government personnel, Wojdakowski was investigated in the Abu Graib scandal.

Brigadier General Janis Karpinski, a general who was later disciplined for her role in the scandal, placed Maj. Gen. Wojdakowski at a meeting in late November at which there was extensive discussion of a Red Cross report that cited specific cases of abuse.

In November 2006, the German government received a complaint seeking the prosecution of Wojdakowski for alleged war crimes. The complaint alleged that during his tenure he was legally responsible for the U.S. torture programs. After an investigation, he was cleared of all charges.
