= Ulrika Sundberg =

Swedish diplomat

Ulrika Sundberg is a Swedish diplomat. Her most recent appointment is Sweden's ambassador to Ireland and previously to Belgium (Sweden based) and Pakistan.

In 2002 Sundberg wrote a paper entitled, "Durban: The Third World Conference Against Racism, Racial Discrimination, Xenophobia and Related Intolerance," in the International Review of Penal Law. It was her report on conference on racism held in Durban, South Africa in 2000, and the problems confrerees had agreeing on a definition of discrimination. In 2005 Sundberg wrote a nineteen-page report, entitled, "Human Rights and Terrorism: Some Comments on the Work of United Nations Commission on Human Rights," in the International Review of Penal Law.

In 2006 Sundberg took a lead role in Swedish efforts to have the World Bank to incorporate human rights standards into its lending.

Sundberg had regular meetings with Rehman Malik, Pakistan's Minister of the Interior, when four Muslim Swedes, Mehdi Ghezali, Munir Awad, Safia Benaouda, and her two-year-old child, were captured and faced allegations that they had ties to terrorism. The four were captured on August 28, 2009, and were released, without charge, on October 10, 2009.

Diplomatic posts
| Preceded by Anna-Karin Eneström | Ambassador of Sweden to Pakistan; 2009–2011 | Succeeded by Lars-Hjalmar Wide |
| Preceded by Magnus Robach | Ambassador of Sweden to Belgium; 2011–2014 | Succeeded by Maria Christina Lundqvist |
| Preceded by Elisabet Borsiin Bonnier | Ambassador of Sweden to Ireland; 2014–2016 | Succeeded by Anna Brandt |
