= William Brandenburg =

William Brandenburg may refer to:

- Will Brandenburg (born 1987), American alpine ski racer
- William H. Brandenburg (1951/2–2024), U.S. Army general
