= Gitmo (disambiguation) =

Gitmo is the Guantanamo Bay Naval Base, a US naval base.

Gitmo may also refer to:

- Guantánamo Bay, a bay at the southeastern end of Cuba
- Guantanamo Bay detention camp, in the Guantánamo Bay Naval Base
- Gitmo: The New Rules of War, a documentary film about the detention camp

== See also ==
- Good Morning Gitmo, a one-act dark comedy about the detention camp
- Guantanamo (disambiguation)
