= Omar Abdalla Aboelazm =

Swedish citizen

- Born: Äppelbo, Sweden

Omar Abdalla Aboelazm is a Swedish citizen who was arrested in Denmark in 2010 over a suspected terror plot against the Danish newspaper Jyllands-Posten.

Aboelazm was born in Äppelbo, Vansbro Municipality, Dalarna County, Sweden, to a Swedish mother and an Egyptian father. He has two half-siblings on his mother's side and five half-siblings on his father's side. One of his half-sisters is a neighbor to Sahbi Zalouti, one of the other suspects who was arrested in the same case. He is unmarried and has no children.

According to an article in Expressen, Aboelazm has Asperger syndrome. In 2000 he was sentenced to psychiatric treatment after an assault in 1999 when he also made sexual advances against a 25-year-old woman. He had then also molested a 23-year-old woman, a 16-year-old girl, a 13-year-old girl and three 15-year-old girls on six occasions. During a psychiatric examination in 2002, doctors concluded that Aboelazm had a "grave mental disorder" and was in need of "psychiatric treatment associated with deprivation of freedom or other coercion".

While detained in Denmark, he was suspected of planned new attacks as police found instructions to construct weaponry in his cell along with plans of public places. After being transferred to a Swedish prison, he received a number of warnings for refusing to work and disorderly conduct.
