= Donald T. Phillips =

Donald T. Phillips (born March 10, 1952) is a nonfiction writer. He has written or coauthored 20 books, including a trilogy on American leadership (Lincoln on Leadership, The Founding Fathers on Leadership, and Martin Luther King Jr. on Leadership).

Phillips has also collaborated on books with several celebrities, including: Norman Brinker, Mike Krzyzewski, Phil Mickelson, Rudy Ruettiger, Greg Norman, Cal Ripken Jr., and Lt. Gen. Ricardo S. Sanchez.

== Works ==
- 1992- Lincoln on Leadership
- 1996- On the Brink: The Life and Leadership of Norman Brinker (with Norman Brinker)
- 1997- Lincoln Stories for Leaders
- 1997- The Founding Fathers on Leadership
- 1999- Martin Luther King Jr. on Leadership
- 1999- A Diamond in Spring
- 2000- Leading With the Heart: Coach K's Successful Strategies in Basketball, Business, and Life (by Mike Krzyzewski)
- 2001- Run to Win: Vince Lombardi On Coaching and Leadership
- 2001- Five Point Play: The Story of Duke's Amazing 2000–2001 Championship Season (by Mike Krzyzewski)
- 2002- Unto Us a Child: Abuse and Deception in the Catholic Church
- 2003- Character in Action: The U.S. Coast Guard on Leadership (with Adm. James M. Loy)
- 2005- One Magical Sunday: But Winning Isn't Everything (by Phil Mickelson)
- 2005- Disasters: Wasted Lives, Valuable Lessons (with Randall Bell)
- 2005- The Rudy in You: A Guide to Building Teamwork, Fair Play, and Good Sportsmanship for Young Athletes, Parents, and Coaches (with Rudy Ruettiger and Peter M. Leddy)
- 2006- The Way of the Shark by (Greg Norman)
- 2006- On the Wing of Speed: George Washington and the Battle of Yorktown
- 2007- Get in the Game: Eight Elements of Perseverance that Make the Difference by (Cal Ripken Jr.)
- 2007- The Clinton Charisma: A Legacy of Leadership
- 2008- The Architecture of Leadership (with ADM James M. Loy)
- 2008- Wiser in Battle: A Soldier's Story (by LTGEN Ricardo S. Sanchez)
