= The Swedish Theory of Love =

- Directed by: Erik Gandini
- Written by: Erik Gandini
- Produced by: Erik Gandini, Juan Pablo Libossart
- Cinematography: Vania Tegamelli, Carl Nilsson
- Release date: 15 November 2015 (Stockholm International Film Festival)
- Country: Sweden

The Swedish Theory of Love is a 2015 Swedish documentary film directed by Erik Gandini.

The documentary offers a critical look into the ideas and practice of "state individualism". In Sweden most benefits of the welfare state are connected with the individual and seek to promote their individual autonomy, whereas in other countries the institutions of the welfare state are more focused on households. In Swedish this ideology is called statist individualism. The film examines how this has affected Swedish society since the 1960s.

From a review of the film: "with great rhythm and without losing the audience along the way, Gandini shows us the other, darker side of progress, riches and independence." Another reviewer said that "It doesn’t really add up to much of an argument, jollied along as it is by stylised editing and jaunty ironic music."
