= Munir Awad =

Lebanon-born Swedish terrorist

- Born: 1981 (age 44–45)
- Arrested: 2007; Somalia; Kenyan Army
- Released: 2007
- Citizenship: Sweden
- Detained at: black sites
- Charge: extrajudicial detention

Munir Awad
- Motive: Islamist revenge over Muhammad cartoons
- Convictions: Guilty, June 2012
- Criminal charge: Planning a terrorist attack in 2010
- Penalty: 12 years in prison

Munir Awad (Arabic: منير عوض) is a Lebanon-born citizen of Sweden who was convicted of plotting a terrorist attack in Denmark. Munir Awad, and his fiancée were arrested in Kenya in 2007 when Ethiopian forces invaded Somalia and foreigners were detained as suspected terrorists. On December 29, 2010 Awad was arrested in Denmark and in 2012 was found guilty of plotting a terrorist attack in revenge for Jyllands-Posten's publication of Muhammad cartoons.

== Arrested in Kenya ==
Munir Awad, and his fiancée (daughter of Helena Hummasten/Benaouda, Finnish-born head of the Muslim Council of Sweden), were arrested in Kenya on January 18, 2007 having fled Somalia after Ethiopian forces invaded Somalia. Though his partner referred to Awad as her husband they were not legally married at the time since she was below the legal age.

The pair describe being held in extrajudicial detention following the invasion, together with a large number of foreigners, among whom were the family of US islamist Daniel Maldonado. They were eventually released. They told reporters for Press TV that the soldiers who captured them were led by Americans and that Americans ran their interrogations.

According to an interview his fiancée gave to Raymond Bonner of the International Herald Tribune her interrogators kept asking her questions about a trip they said her boyfriend took to Denmark to recruit jihadists. Benaouda told her interviewer that she told her interrogators that Awad had never been to Denmark, and that he did not convert to Islam until after 2004.

His fiancée said she and her boyfriend had traveled to Dubai, on vacation, but were disappointed at how commercialized facilities for tourists were. So they traveled to Somalia to see a more traditional Muslim culture. They arrived in Somalia shortly before it was invaded.

== Arrested in Pakistan ==
On August 20, 2009 the pair and their young child were apprehended in Pakistan, together with fellow Swede Mehdi Ghezali, and nine other non-Pakistanis. Ghezali is reported to have told authorities that they were traveling to Lahore to participate in a Tablighi Jamaat conference. Mohammad Rizwan, the chief of police of Dera Ghazi Khan, who arrested them, told the press that their luggage included a laptop computer, $10,000 USD and a knife.

During his 43-day incarceration Helena Benaouda, the mother of his partner campaigned for their release.

In May 2010, Awad was invited to speak at a seminar criticizing the anti-terrorism laws of Sweden organized by Muslim Human Rights Committee (MMRK).

== 2010 Copenhagen terror plot ==
On December 29, 2010 he was arrested in Denmark, this time for the Copenhagen terror plot that was allegedly planning a "Mumbai-style" attack in revenge for the Jyllands-Posten Muhammad cartoons controversy. In addition to Awad the suspects include 30-year-old Swede Omar Abdalla Aboelazm, 44-year-old Tunisian national Mounir Dhahri, and 37-year-old Swede of Tunisian descent, Sahbi Zalouti. In June 2012 Awad along with the three other suspects were found guilty by the Danish court and they were sentenced to twelve years in prison.

The state prosecutor demanded a 14 year sentence, while a lay judge recommended a 10 year sentence. The judges chose a sentence of 12 years.

He was released in 2018
