= Elisabet Borsiin Bonnier =

Swedish diplomat (1950–2024)

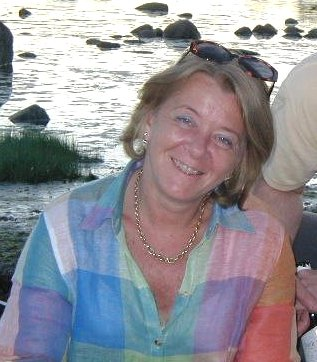
Elisabet Borsiin Bonnier in 2001

Elisabet Borsiin Bonnier (12 February 1950 – 21 July 2024) was a Swedish diplomat.

From 1973 she was working for the Swedish Foreign Ministry. From 1998 to 2003 she served as Ambassador of Sweden to Estonia.

== Awards and decorations ==
- (Estonia) Order of the Cross of Terra Mariana, I class (2003)
- Grand Decoration of Honour in Gold for Services to the Republic of Austria (1994)

Diplomatic posts
| Preceded by Katarina Brodin | Ambassador of Sweden to Estonia; 1998–2003 | Succeeded by Dag Hartelius |
| Preceded by Johan Molander | Permanent Representative of Sweden to the United Nations in Geneva; 2003–2007 | Succeeded by Hans Dahlgren |
| Preceded by Robert Rydberg | Ambassador of Sweden to Israel; 2007–2010 | Succeeded by Elinor Hammarskjöld |
| Preceded by Claes Ljungdahl | Ambassador of Sweden to Ireland; 2010–2014 | Succeeded by Ulrika Sundberg |
