= Geoffrey D. Miller =

Retired United States Army Major General

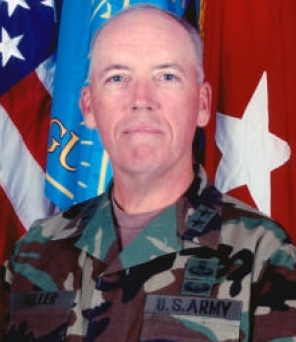
- MG Geoffrey D. Miller - former Commander JTF Guantanamo
- Born: c. 1949 (age 76–77); Gallipolis, Ohio, U.S.
- Relatives: Bob Evans (uncle)
- Military career
- Allegiance: United States of America
- Branch: United States Army
- Service years: 1972–2006
- Rank: Major general
- Commands: Joint Task Force Guantanamo
- Conflicts: Iraq War

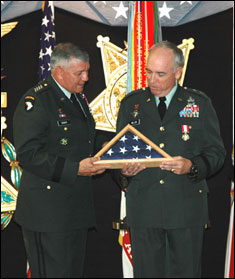
MG Geoffrey Miller honored after his retirement

Geoffrey D. Miller (born c. 1949) is a retired United States Army major general who commanded the US detention facilities at Guantanamo Bay, Cuba, and Iraq. Detention facilities in Iraq under his command included Abu Ghraib prison, Camp Cropper, and Camp Bucca. He is noted for having trained soldiers in using torture, or "enhanced interrogation techniques" in US euphemism, and for carrying out the "First Special Interrogation Plan," signed by the Secretary of Defense, against a Guantanamo detainee. Due to this use of torture, it was requested by several human rights groups that Miller, among other US officials, be prosecuted for war crimes.

Miller was born in Gallipolis, Ohio. He attended Ohio State University, where he earned an undergraduate degree in history, following this with a Master of Science in Education Administration at the University of Southern California. Miller is the nephew of Bob Evans, of Bob Evans Restaurants, franchiser from Rio Grande, Ohio.

Miller joined the US Army in 1972 and was trained in field artillery and army command. He spent time in Germany before being stationed in Korea in 1980. There, he rose to become assistant chief of staff for operations in Korea. Miller later returned to the United States to become the deputy chief of staff for personnel and installation management for the U.S. Army.

== Guantanamo Bay, Cuba ==
In November 2002, Miller was given command of Joint Task Force Guantanamo (JTF-GTMO), where he served into late 2004. He ran the US detention facilities known as Camp X-Ray, Camp Delta, and Camp Echo in the US Naval Base at Guantanamo, Cuba. In 2002 Miller claimed that two-thirds of the 600 prisoners had confessed to being involved in terrorism and were giving "actionable intelligence."

On December 2, 2002, United States secretary of defense Donald Rumsfeld authorized in writing the "First Special Interrogation Plan," listing 17 techniques to be used on the detainee Mohammed al-Qahtani. These were developed in consultation with Miller, who carried them out. It was later revealed that such techniques were used more widely against other prisoners as well. Miller advocated the use of extreme torture. At the time, the Red Cross was denied access to detainees.

On September 22, 2003, Miller ordered the arrest of James Yee, an Army captain who served as a chaplain for the Muslim prisoners at Guantanamo. Miller accused Yee of stealing classified documents and smuggling them out of the prison, but those charges were later dropped. Captain Yee was honorably discharged on January 7, 2004. It is believed that no evidence of espionage was found, but records on the case have been sealed.

== Abu Ghraib prison scandal ==
In 2008, as a result of a joint Senate investigation by the Intelligence and Armed Services Committees, it was revealed that on March 14, 2003, John Yoo of the Office of Legal Counsel, Department of Justice, issued a legal opinion to William Haynes, General Counsel of the Department of Defense, in which he concluded that federal laws related to the use of torture and other abuse would not apply to US interrogators overseas. This was five days before the US invasion of Iraq began on March 19, 2003. Yoo had also been involved in drafting what came to be known as the Torture Memos of August 2002, which had been issued to the CIA. In June 2004, Jack Goldsmith, then head of OLC, advised Defense and the CIA not to rely on these memos.

In August 2003, Miller was sent to Iraq by the Department of Defense to advise on "more productive" interrogations of Iraqi prisoners. In September, Miller submitted a report that recommended "GTMO-ising" their approach – combining the detention and interrogation units at Abu Ghraib prison into the Theater Joint Interrogation and Detention Center. Specifically, Miller suggested that prison guards be used to "soften up" prisoners for interrogations.

In his final report on the prison abuse at Abu Ghraib the following year, General Antonio Taguba blamed Miller's recommendations for the abuse. He said that using military police or guards for interrogation was a breach of official policy. Miller denies that he specifically ordered guards to torture prisoners to get information.

After the Abu Ghraib prisoner abuse story broke in April 2004, Brigadier General Janis Karpinski was suspended. Miller was appointed as the deputy commanding general for detainee operations for Multinational Forces in Iraq. In this role, Miller reported directly to Lieutenant General Ricardo Sanchez. Miller vowed to reduce the number of prisoners in Abu Ghraib, adhere to military laws as well as the Geneva Convention, investigate allegations of abuse, and reform the Iraqi prison system. He banned the use of hoods on prisoners during transport and set up a new system to allow prisoners to have visitors.

Since the investigation of abuses at Abu Ghraib, some have suggested that Miller had earlier encouraged abusive tactics. In an interview with BBC Radio, Janis Karpinski, the former prison commander, claimed that Miller had told her to treat prisoners "like dogs," saying, "if you allow them to believe at any point that they are more than a dog then you've lost control of them". Major General Miller denies the statement.

Colonel Thomas Pappas, head of the military intelligence brigade at Abu Ghraib, has claimed that it was Miller's idea to use attack dogs to intimidate prisoners. He said the same tactics were being used at Camp X-Ray at Guantanamo. Several of the photos taken at Abu Ghraib show dogs surrounding (and in at least one case biting) screaming, naked detainees.

In November 2004, Miller was replaced as deputy commanding general for detainee operations by Major General William H. Brandenburg.

=== Exercised Fifth Amendment right ===
In 2006, Miller exercised his use of the Fifth Amendment in refusing to answer certain questions while testifying in courts martial cases related to Abu Ghraib. He also used his right during a hearing before the US Senate in 2006. According to The New York Times: "He changed his position when the US Senate Armed Services Committee delayed his retirement until he was more forthcoming."

In May 2006, Miller testified at the courts martial of the Abu Ghraib dog handlers that his instructions on the use of dogs had been misunderstood. Miller testified that he instructed that dogs should be used "only for custody and control of detainees". The next day Miller's testimony was directly contradicted by Lieutenant Colonel Jerry Phillabaum, the commander of Abu Ghraib's Military Police detachment.

== Request for war crimes prosecution ==
In November 2006, the German government received a complaint seeking the prosecution of Alberto Gonzales, then-Attorney General and former White House Counsel, for alleged war crimes. Co-defendants included: Geoffrey D. Miller, Donald H. Rumsfeld, George Tenet, Stephen Cambone, Ricardo S. Sanchez, Walter Wojdakowski, Thomas M. Pappas, Barbara Fast, Marc Warren, John Yoo, William J. Haynes, II, David Addington, and Jay Bybee, top political appointees who participated in making policy about the use of enhanced interrogation techniques for CIA and DOD.

On November 14, 2006, the German attorney Wolfgang Kaleck filed the complaint with the Public Prosecutor General (Generalbundesanwalt) against Miller for his complicity in torture and other crimes against humanity at Abu Ghraib prison in Iraq and Guantanamo Bay, Cuba. Kaleck was acting on behalf of 11 victims of torture and other human rights abuses, as well as about 30 human rights activists and organizations who are co-plaintiffs.

The co-plaintiffs to the war crimes prosecution include: 1980 Nobel Peace Prize winner Adolfo Pérez Esquivel (Argentina), 2002 Nobel Peace Prize winner Martín Almada (Paraguay), Theo van Boven, the former United Nations Special Rapporteur on Torture, Sister Dianna Ortiz (Torture survivor, executive director of Torture Abolition and Survivors Support Coalition International), the International Federation for Human Rights, the International Peace Bureau (Nobel Peace Prize winner in 1910), the International Association of Lawyers Against Nuclear Arms, European Democratic Lawyers, European Democratic Jurists, International Association of Democratic Lawyers, Comité de Acción Jurídica (Argentina), Liga Argentina por los Derechos del Hombre (Argentina), Bahrain Human Rights Society, Lawyers Against the War (Canada), Colectivo de Abogados José Alvear Restrepo (Colombia), Association Africaine des Droits de l'Homme (Democratic Republic of Congo), Egyptian Organization for Human Rights (Egypt), Ligue Française des Droits de l'Homme (France), The Republican Attorneys' Association (Germany), Amman Center for Human Rights Studies (Jordan), Comisión Mexicana de Defensa y Promoción de los Derechos Humanos (Mexico), Liga Mexicana por la Defensa de los Derechos Humanos, Centro Nicaragüense de Derechos Humanos (Nicaragua), Palestinian Center for Human Rights, Association Tchadienne pour la Promotion et la Défense des Droits de l'Homme (Chad), Rencontre Africaine pour la Défense des Droits de l'Homme (Senegal), The Center for Constitutional Rights (United States), National Lawyers Guild (US), Torture Abolition and Survivors Support Coalition International (US), and Veterans for Peace (US).

The German prosecutor declined to initiate proceedings.

On January 7, 2011, the Center for Constitutional Rights (CCR) and the European Center for Constitutional and Human Rights (ECCHR) asked a Spanish judge to subpoena Miller to explain his role in the torture of four former detainees.

On April 2, 2015, the Court of Appeal of Paris ordered a first hearing of Miller to be conducted before a French magistrate prior to potential prosecutions. A subpoena will be addressed to Miller. On February 19, 2016, General Miller was summoned to a hearing regarding allegation of torture by two French citizens. Miller faced one allegation of illegal detention and torture of two detainees Mourad Benchelli and Nizar Sassi. Benchelli and Sassi were detained at Guantánamo Bay from 2002 and 2004 on terrorism related charges. After being transferred to French custody, both were convicted of charges in 2009 but not sent to prison. In April 2016, the French Court of Appeal approved Benchelli and Sassi's request and demanded Miller appear at a hearing for questioning, but Miller ignored the summons.

== Congressional testimony ==
In July 2005, discrepancies emerged between Miller's May 2004 testimony to the Senate Armed Services Committee, and sworn statements he made three months later.

On May 19, 2004, Miller had testified to the committee that he had only filed a report on his visit to Abu Ghraib, and didn't talk to Secretary Rumsfield or any of his top aides. Miller stated, that he "submitted the report up to SOUTHCOM (U.S. Southern Command, where Miller was attached in 2003)," and "had no direct discussions with [United States Under Secretary of Defense for Intelligence and Security Stephen] Cambone." Three months later, Miller said he and Cambone had discussed "how we could improve the flow of intelligence from Iraq through and in interrogations." Also, he released a statement to defense lawyers for guards being accused of prisoner abuse stating he gave an outbrief to both Deputy Secretary Paul Wolfowitz and Secretary Miller said in the August 21, 2004, statement to lawyers for guards accused of prisoner abuse, a transcript of which was obtained by the Chicago Tribune.

== Retirement ==
Miller retired from the Army on July 31, 2006. The Washington Post reports that Miller had wanted to retire in February, forgoing trying for promotion to lieutenant general, because his reputation had been damaged by alleged links between his policies at the Guantanamo Bay detainment camp and at Abu Ghraib, and the abuse of prisoners. The Washington Post reported that Congress delayed his retirement because senators were not confident he told the truth when he testified before them. The Washington Post reports that he was allowed to retire only when he promised, in writing, to appear before Congress, and testify truthfully.

At his retirement service, Miller was awarded the Distinguished Service Medal, and praised as an "innovator".

== See also ==
- Enhanced interrogation techniques
- Murat Kurnaz, German resident held without sufficient cause at Guantanamo detention camps for five years and abused under interrogation
- Lakhdar Boumediene, Bosnian citizen imprisoned seven years in Guantanamo detention camps; the Supreme Court ruled the US had insufficient evidence to hold him

Military offices
Preceded by BG Janis Karpinski	Deputy Commanding General (Detainee Operations) / Commanding General Task Force 134; 2004	Succeeded by MG William H. Brandenburg
