= Gitmo: The New Rules of War =

- Directed by: Erik Gandini; Tarik Saleh
- Release date: 2005
- Running time: 82 minutes
- Country: Sweden

Gitmo: The New Rules of War is a Swedish documentary about the Guantanamo Bay detention camp by Erik Gandini and Tarik Saleh. The film features interviews with Janis Karpinski, Mehdi Ghezali and Geoffrey Miller, among others.

Gitmo premiered at IDFA in 2005 and reached mainstream theaters in Sweden on 10 February 2006.

In 2003, a year after Swedish citizen Mehdi Ghezali was detained at "Gitmo", which sparked some media interest in Sweden, Erik and Tarik started filming the documentary and visited the base on a guided tour of selected areas. Mehdi Ghezali was released in 2004, and was interviewed for the film.

In 2006, the musical score composed by Krister Linder won first prize for music in a TV feature at the Festival international Musique et Cinéma in Auxerre, France.
