= Janis Karpinski =

Retired United States Army officer (born 1953)

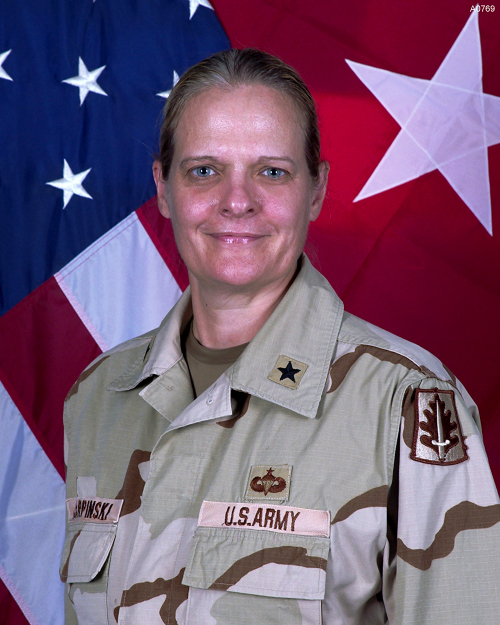
- Born: Janis Beam; May 25, 1953 (age 73); Rahway, New Jersey
- Military career
- Allegiance: United States
- Branch: United States Army
- Service years: 1977–2005
- Rank: Colonel (formerly Brigadier General)
- Commands: Abu Ghraib prison 160th Military Police Battalion
- Conflicts: Gulf War; Iraq War
- Awards: Bronze Star Medal; Meritorious Service Medal (3); Army Commendation Medal (3); Army Achievement Medal
- Other work: Author, One Woman's Army

Janis Leigh Karpinski (née Beam, born May 25, 1953) is a retired career officer in the United States Army Reserve. She is notable for having commanded the forces that operated Abu Ghraib and other prisons in Iraq in 2003 and 2004, at the time of the scandal related to torture and prisoner abuse. She commanded three prisons in Iraq and the forces that ran them.

In June 2003, during the United States-led occupation of Iraq, Karpinski was given command of the 800th Military Police Brigade, which meant she was responsible for the 15 detention facilities in southern and central Iraq run by Coalition forces. Karpinski was also given command of the National Guard and Army reserve units in the Iraqi city of Mosul. In January 2004, Lieutenant General Ricardo Sanchez formally suspended Karpinski and 16 other soldiers with undisclosed reprimands. An investigation was started into the abuse at Abu Ghraib, and Karpinski left Iraq for reasons that were explained at the time as part of "routine troop rotations."

On April 8, 2005, Karpinski was formally relieved of command of the 800th Military Police Brigade. On May 5, 2005, President George W. Bush approved Karpinski's demotion to colonel from the rank of brigadier general. Her demotion was not related officially to the abuse at Abu Ghraib.

In October 2005, she published an account of her experiences, One Woman's Army, in which she claims that the abuses were done by contract employees trained in Afghanistan and Guantanamo Bay, and sent to Abu Ghraib under orders from the Secretary of Defense Donald Rumsfeld. She said her demotion was political retribution.

Since this time, some of Karpinski's claims of top-level authorization have been confirmed by revelations of what are known as the Torture Memos, legal opinions prepared by political appointees including John Yoo in the Office of Legal Counsel, Department of Justice. His memo of March 14, 2003, five days before the US began its invasion of Iraq, concluded that federal laws related to torture and other abuses did not apply to interrogators working overseas; it was issued to William J. Haynes, the General Counsel of DOD, and finally revealed in 2008 as a result of a Senate hearing into enhanced interrogation techniques.

== Early career ==
Raised in Rahway, New Jersey, she graduated from Rahway High School in 1971. Her education included a Bachelor of Arts degree in English and secondary education from Kean College, a Master of Arts degree in aviation management from Embry-Riddle Aeronautical University, and a Master of Arts in strategic studies from the United States Army War College.

Karpinski was commissioned into the United States Army as a second lieutenant in 1977. She served primarily in intelligence and military police assignments, training the first group of female soldiers for the United Arab Emirates, and toured supporting the Special Forces and in Saudi Arabia during the Gulf War. She was awarded a Bronze Star Medal.

In 1987, she moved from the regular Army to the Army Reserve. In the private sector, she became a consultant who ran military-styled training programs for executives.

== Marriage and family ==
She is married to George Karpinski, a lieutenant colonel at the United States embassy in Oman.

== Iraq service ==
In June 2003, during the U.S.-led occupation of Iraq, Karpinski was in command of the 800th Military Police Brigade placing her in charge of the fifteen detention facilities in southern and central Iraq run by Coalition forces. She had no experience running correctional facilities. Karpinski was also given command of the National Guard and Army reserve units in the Iraqi city of Mosul who handled prisoners. Most of the forces had no training in handling prisoners, but at least two of the guardsmen later convicted of prisoner abuse had lengthy civilian experience as prison guards.

In September 2003, Karpinski led Secretary of Defense Donald Rumsfeld on a tour of the Abu Ghraib prison to demonstrate the way it had been used by Saddam Hussein to torture his enemies.

=== Allegations, suspension and investigation ===
In October 2003, allegations of torture in the United States-managed Iraqi prisons began to surface. Karpinski insisted that prisoners under her watch were treated "humanely and fairly". In an interview with the St. Petersburg Times in December 2003, Karpinski said conditions in the prison were better than many Iraqi homes, and joked that the prisoners were treated so well that she was "concerned they wouldn't want to leave."

In January 2004, Lieutenant General Ricardo Sanchez formally suspended Karpinski and 16 other soldiers with undisclosed reprimands. An investigation was started into the abuse. Karpinski was reassigned in what was said at the time to be part of "routine troop rotations." In July 2003, Karpinski stated she had evidence Israelis were involved in interrogations.

On April 8, 2005, Karpinski was formally relieved of command of the 800th Military Police Brigade. On May 5, 2005, President Bush approved Karpinski's demotion to Colonel from the rank of Brigadier General. Her demotion was not officially related to the abuse at Abu Ghraib prison. The allegations against her were for dereliction of duty, making a material misrepresentation to investigators, failure to obey a lawful order and shoplifting.

=== Taguba Report ===
In his final report, Major General Antonio Taguba blamed Karpinski for the abuse, indicating she had not paid attention to the daily operations of the prison. According to Taguba, Karpinski rarely visited the prisons during her tenure, and she reviewed and signed reports about claims of abuse without following up to make sure her orders were carried out. As a consequence, the abuse was allowed to continue and her subordinates developed a lax attitude towards protocol. Karpinski was cited throughout the Taguba Report for repeated violations of procedure and good management, and not exercising her command as directed by regulations. During interviews cited in the Taguba report, Karpinski was described as disconnected from the operations of her area of command.

14. (U) During the course of this investigation I conducted a lengthy interview with BG Karpinski that lasted over four hours, and is included verbatim in the investigation Annexes. BG Karpinski was extremely emotional during much of her testimony. What I found particularly disturbing in her testimony was her complete unwillingness to either understand or accept that many of the problems inherent in the 800th MP Brigade were caused or exacerbated by poor leadership and the refusal of her command to both establish and enforce basic standards and principles among its soldiers. (ANNEX 45 and the Personal Observations of the Interview Team).

Karpinski was issued a Memorandum of Admonishment by LTG Sanchez, Commander, CJTF-7, on 17 January 2004.

In April 2004, CBS' 60 Minutes II broadcast photographs of Iraqi prisoners being tortured and humiliated at Abu Ghraib, which had been taken by military personnel. Following the broadcast, Karpinski was suspended from her duties and replaced by Major General Geoffrey Miller, the former commander of Camp X-Ray, part of the Guantanamo Bay detention camp.

=== Karpinski's defense ===
Karpinski insisted she had no knowledge of the abuse and claims the particular wing of the prison was under the control of military intelligence "twenty-four hours a day." She claims Army intelligence officers encouraged guards to torture prisoners as an aid to interrogation, and that she was a scapegoat.

A June 2004 BBC article said, "Gen Karpinski believes the soldiers had not taken the pictures of their own accord." It quotes her as saying:

I know that the MP unit that these soldiers belonged to hadn't been in Abu Ghraib long enough to be so confident that one night or early morning they were going to take detainees out of their cells, pile them up and photograph themselves in various positions with these detainees.

Since her suspension, Karpinski has made controversial accusations against her superiors in a series of interviews. In an interview with BBC Radio, Karpinski claimed that Major General Geoffrey Miller, who was sent from Camp X-Ray in Guantanamo Bay to improve interrogations at the Iraqi prison, told her to treat prisoners "like dogs" in the sense that "if you allow them to believe at any point that they are more than a dog then you've lost control of them". Miller denies that he ever made the remarks.

In November 2006, Karpinski told Spain's El País newspaper she had seen a letter apparently signed by Rumsfeld that allowed civilian contractors to use techniques such as sleep deprivation during interrogation. She stated, "The methods consisted of making prisoners stand for long periods, sleep deprivation ... playing music at full volume, having to sit in uncomfortably ... Rumsfeld authorized these specific techniques." According to Karpinski, Rumsfeld's handwritten signature was above his printed name and in the same handwriting in the margin was written: "Make sure this is accomplished."

There have been no comments from either the Pentagon or US army spokespeople in Iraq on Karpinski's accusations. But, since that time, there have been revelations about the Torture Memos, including one issued by John Yoo on March 14, 2003, to the General Counsel of DOD, in which he advised that federal laws related to torture and other abuses did not apply to interrogators overseas – five days before the US invasion of Iraq.

On March 8, 2006, Karpinski gave an interview to Dateline, on the Australian SBS network. When asked who was ultimately responsible for the actions of torture and humiliation depicted in the photographs, Karpinski said:

You have to go back to the memorandum that was authored by our now-Attorney-General, Alberto Gonzales, and John Yoo, from out in California, who was with the current administration at the time, and they did a memorandum, authorizing departures from the Geneva Convention.

The memorandum, which was discussed at length with the Secretary of Defense and the Vice-President, according to sworn statements by people who were there when those conversations took place, that authorized the initial departure [from the Geneva Convention]. And yes, there was a memorandum that was posted at Abu Ghraib prison, that I only became aware of, after I heard of this ongoing investigation out at Abu Ghraib, and it was signed by the Secretary of Defense.

... the signature on the memorandum was over the signature block of the Secretary of Defense, Donald Rumsfeld, and the ink that was used to sign appeared to be the same ink used for this handwritten note in the margin, "make sure this happens", and it was a list of interrogation techniques that were approved, so he obviously had knowledge of those [interrogation] techniques.

When the Secretary of Defense, General Geoffrey Miller, General Ricardo Sanchez, and General Antonio Taguba testified before the Senate Armed Services Committee, they were very careful to say, in response to a question about the photographs, that they knew nothing about the photographs. However, nobody on the Senate Armed Services Committee asked them "Did you know anything about the actions depicted in those photographs?" Because they would have had to give a truthful answer and the answer would have been yes, in fact they authorized the actions depicted in those photographs. The Secretary of Defense authorized it, in conversations with General Miller, his Under-Secretary for Intelligence not only authorized those actions but was staying on top of the progress of those actions and those activities.

When questioned on the findings of the Taguba Report, which stated she had shown a lack of leadership throughout the period of events, and therefore was partly responsible for what happened, Karpinski stated

...When they do an investigation with that kind of potential, the rules are very clear, you have to identify an impartial person to do the investigation and General Taguba did not serve one day in Iraq, he spent his deployment time in the safety of Kuwait. And he was, as it came out afterwards, a good friend of General Sanchez. So if General Sanchez gave the investigating officer specific instructions on what he wanted to see in the conclusions, General Taguba was able and determined to provide and conclude what General Sanchez wanted to see. And he did exactly that. The findings in the report have been largely discredited because he was not an impartial party and because so much more information has come out. ...[General Taguba] was not charged with discovering what caused the photographs, General Taguba's instructions were to investigate the 800th Military Police Brigade and discover what was wrong with General Karpinski.

In a 2004 interview for the Santa Clarita, California newspaper, The Signal, Karpinski claimed to have seen unreleased documents from Rumsfeld that authorized the use of dogs, food and sleep deprivation, and isolation for Iraqi prisoners that were also signed by General Sanchez. Both have denied authorizing such tactics. In a May 2004 military investigation of the Abu Ghraib abuses, made public in 2005 by an ACLU Freedom of Information Act request, Karpinski had said she witnessed children as young as twelve years of age incarcerated at Abu Ghraib.

== Awards ==
- Bronze Star Medal
- Meritorious Service Medal with two oak leaf clusters
- Army Commendation Medal with two oak leaf clusters
- Army Achievement Medal
- Army Reserve Components Achievement Medal
- National Defense Service Medal with star
- Global War on Terrorism Expeditionary Medal
- Global War on Terrorism Service Medal
- Army Service Ribbon
- Overseas Service Ribbon

== Bibliography ==
- One Woman's Army : The Commanding General of Abu Ghraib Tells Her Story, 2005, (ISBN 1-4013-5247-2)
- Sjoberg, Laura; Gentry Caron E. (2007). Triple Transgressions at Abu Ghraib in Mothers, Monsters, Whores. Zed Books. pp58–87. ISBN 978-1-84277-866-1.

== Films ==
- 2005 – Gitmo: The New Rules of War. Directed by Erik Gandini, Tarik Saleh.
- 2006 – Iraq for Sale: The War Profiteers. Directed by Robert Greenwald.
- 2008 – Standard Operating Procedure. Directed by Errol Morris.

== See also ==
- Abu Ghraib
- Abu Ghraib torture and prisoner abuse
- Lynndie England

Military offices
New command	Deputy Commanding General (Detainee Operations) / Commanding General Task Force 134; 2003–2004	Succeeded by Geoffrey Miller
