= Guantánamo (disambiguation) =

Guantánamo is a city and the seat of Guantánamo Province, Cuba

Guantánamo or Guantanamo may also refer to:

- Guantánamo Province in southeastern Cuba
  - Guantánamo Bay, a body of water on the south shore of Cuba
    - Guantanamo Bay Naval Base, a U.S. military base
      - Guantanamo Bay detention camp, a U.S. military prison
    - Battle of Guantánamo Bay, 1898
- Guantánamo (baseball), a Cuban professional baseball club
- "Guantánamo", a song by Outlandish from Bread & Barrels of Water, 2002

== See also ==
- "Guantanamera" (Spanish, 'from Guantánamo'), a Cuban song
- Gitmo (disambiguation)
