= Statist individualism =

Statist individualism is an ideology which pushes for an alliance between state and individual. The ideology's basic tenet is the idea that strong state and individual freedom are not mutually exclusive, but that state interference can strengthen personal autonomy. The term was coined by the historians Henrik Berggren and Lars Trägårdh in 2006.

The concept is mainly used in the context of Sweden. While being one of the most advanced welfare states in the world, Sweden is far from collectivist. The Swedish welfare policies and Family Law are aimed at liberating people from dependence on family, church and private charities.

== Critique on statist individualism ==
In the 2015 documentary The Swedish Theory of Love, the Italian-Swedish director Erik Gandini shows the dark side of statist individualism: alienation and loneliness.

== See also ==
- Individualism
- Statism
- Social democracy
