= Mounir Dhahri =

Mounir Ben Mohamed Dhahri (born 2 February 1966 in Tunisia) is a Tunisian citizen residing in Stockholm, Sweden, who was arrested in Denmark in 2010 over a suspected terror plot against the Danish newspaper Jyllands-Posten.

== Biography ==
Dhahri came to Sweden from Tunisia in August 1993 and received a permanent residence permit in Sweden in January 1996. He has unsuccessfully applied for Swedish citizenship. Dhahri is divorced and has two children with two different women.

Dhahri has been treated for drug abuse and has been convicted several times for assault. In 2000 he was convicted for assault against his then spouse, illegal threat and resisting arrest. In 2004 he was convicted by the Stockholm district court for assault, illegal threat and drugs crime.

In March 2004 Dhahri was convicted by the Stockholm district court for having threatened to kill two employees in a 7-Eleven store in Stockholm in April 2003, after he was denied a request to borrow a telephone.
