= Ireland–Sweden relations =

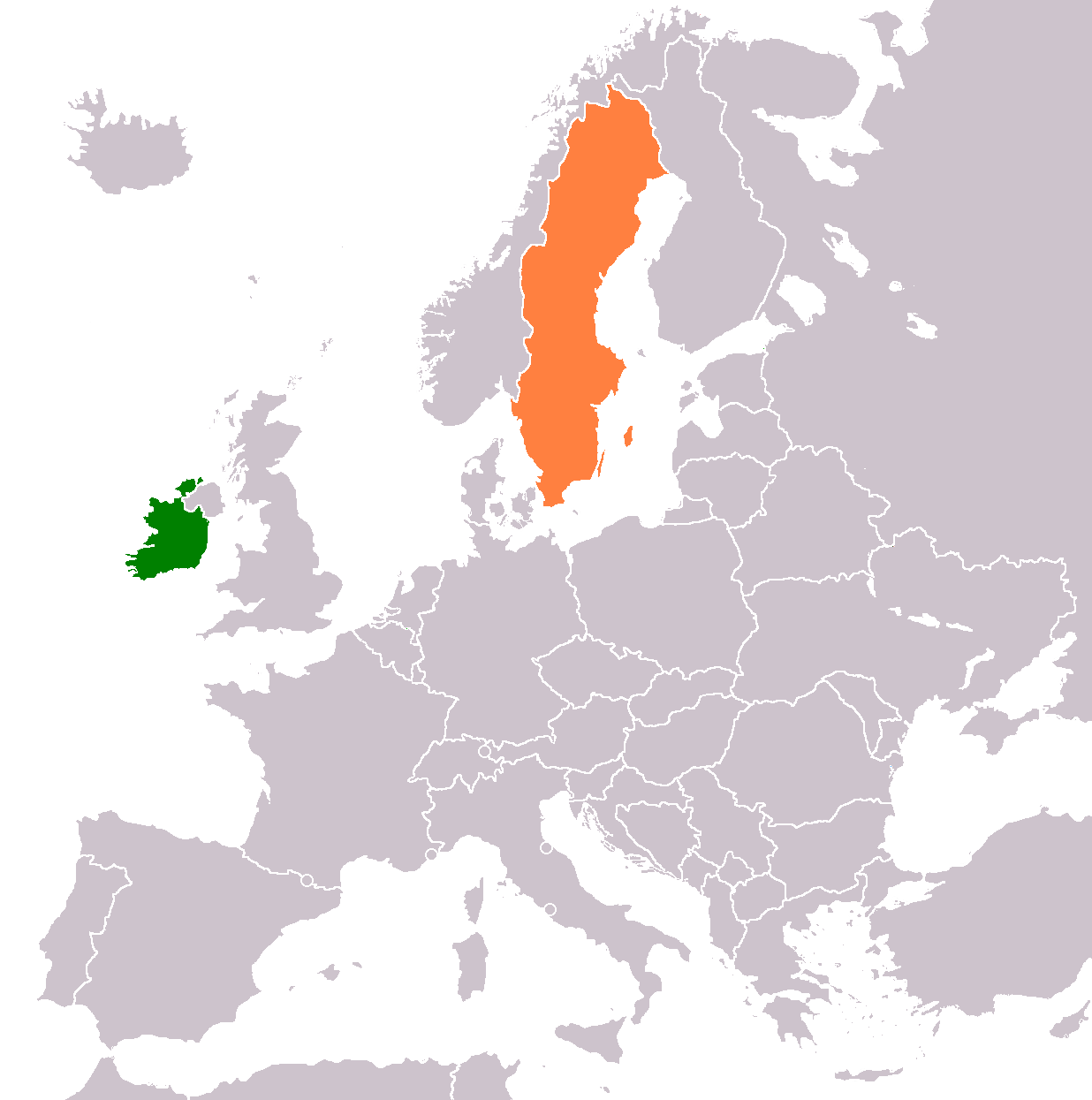

- Ireland: Sweden

Ireland and Sweden maintain foreign relations. Ireland has an embassy in Stockholm, and Sweden has an embassy in Dublin. Both countries are full members of Council of Europe and of the European Union.

== History ==
Vikings from Scandinavia began raiding Ireland just before 800 AD and continued for 200 years before Brian Boru defeated them at the Battle of Clontarf in 1014. The first recorded Viking raid in Ireland occurred in 795 AD, when the church on Lambeg Island (now part of Dublin) was plundered and burned.

On 25 February 1946, an Irish delegation arrived in Stockholm to discuss potential diplomatic relations between Ireland and Sweden. Previous relations had been via the United Kingdom, of which Ireland was a part. On 28 June, John Aloysius Belton (Ireland's charge d'affaires at the time) arrived in Stockholm. Oscar Thorsing was appointed Sweden's chargé d'affaires in Dublin on 1 July 1946. A Swedish legation in Dublin was opened the same year, and the Swedish consulate that had operated since 1926 ceased to exist.

On 26 June 2009, a few days before the start of the Swedish presidency of the European Union, the speaker of the Swedish Parliament Per Westerberg visited Dublin. On 17 July 2009, the Swedish Trade Council closed their office in Dublin and moved Irish operations to their UK office. The embassy of Sweden in Ireland was closed in 2010, with representation handled by a Stockholm-based ambassador from that time, but was reopened in February 2023.

== Diaspora ==
There was 1,944 Swedes in Ireland during the 2022 census and as of 2023, there are 3,467 people born in Ireland living in Sweden.

== Resident diplomatic missions ==
- Ireland has an embassy in Stockholm.
- Sweden has an embassy in Dublin.
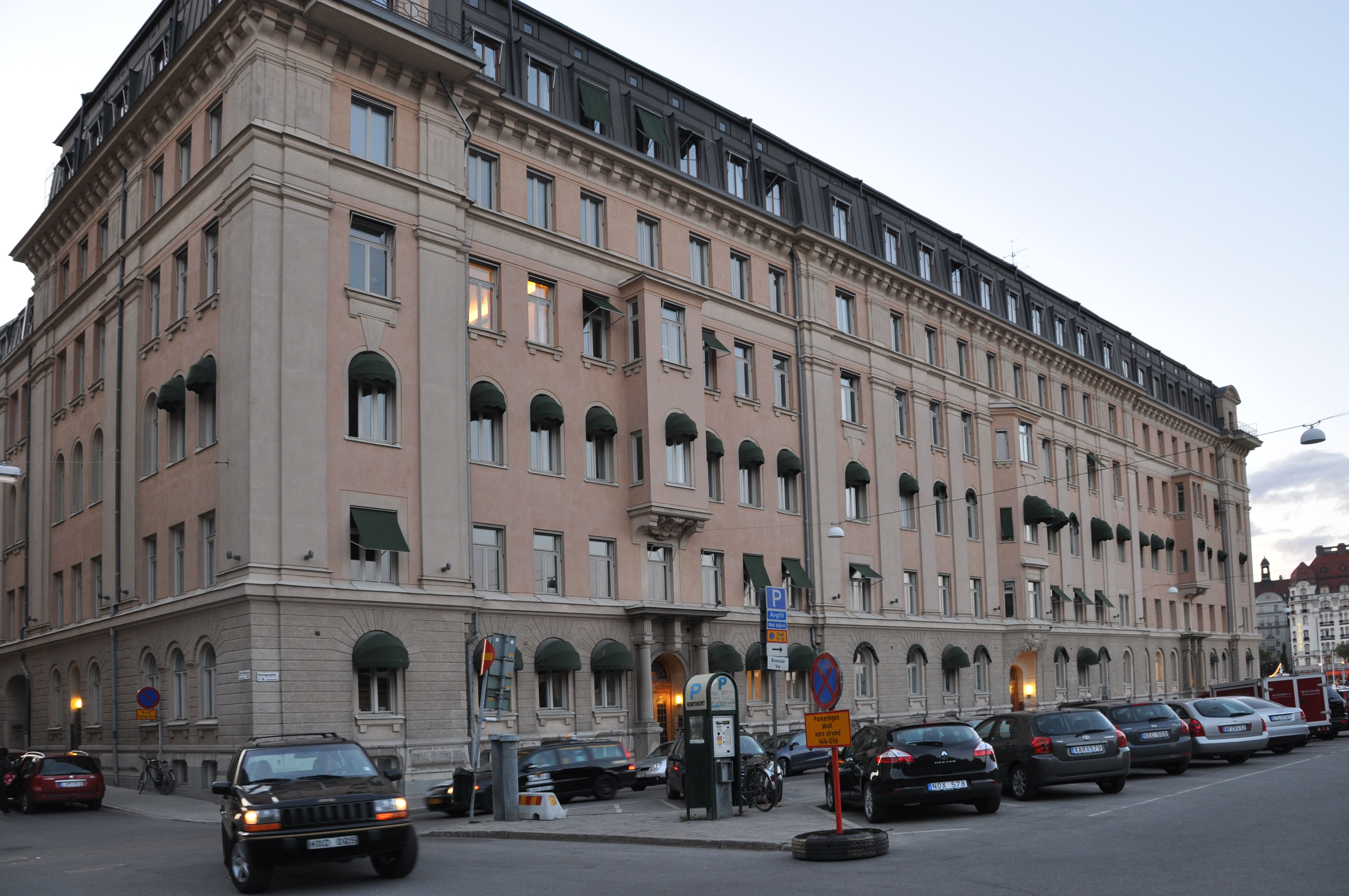
Embassy of Ireland in Stockholm

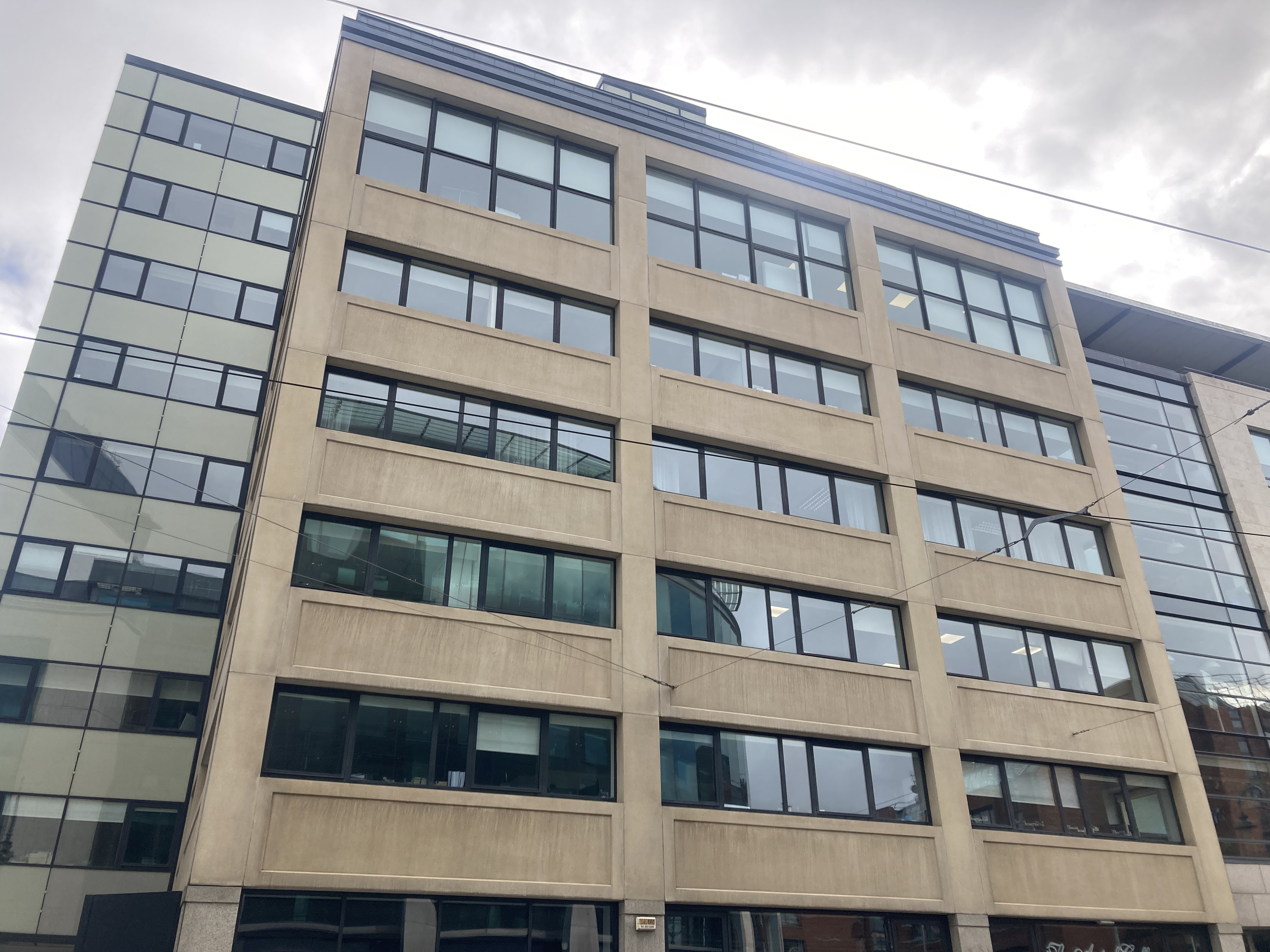
Embassy of Sweden in Dublin

== See also ==
- Foreign relations of Ireland
- Foreign relations of Sweden
- Ireland-NATO relations
- NATO-EU relations
