= William H. Brandenburg =

United States general (died 2024)

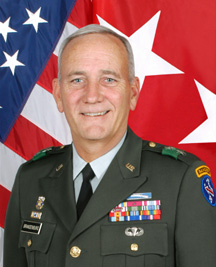
- Born: 1951 or 1952; Elloree, South Carolina, U.S.
- Died: February 26, 2024 (aged 72); South Carolina, U.S.
- Military career
- Allegiance: , United States of America
- Branch: United States Army
- Service years: 1973–2008
- Rank: Major General
- Unit: Retired
- Commands: 1st Battalion, 15th Infantry, 3d Infantry Division (Mechanized); 1st Brigade, 3d Infantry Division (Mechanized); TF-134
- Conflicts: Iraq War
- Awards: Defense Distinguished Service Medal; Legion of Merit; Bronze Star; Ranger tab

William H. Brandenburg Jr. (1951 or 1952 – February 26, 2024) was a major general in the United States Army. He last served as deputy commanding general, U.S. Army, Pacific, August 8, 2003. Prior to his last assignment, he was deputy commanding general for training and readiness, I Corps and Fort Lewis. From November 29, 2004, until December 1, 2005, he deployed to Iraq as deputy commanding general (detainee operations) and commanding general, Task Force 134.

He was a native of Elloree, South Carolina. He was a 1973 graduate from The Citadel, where he received a commission in infantry. He is the son of Brigadier General William H. Brandenburg Sr., (The Citadel, 1943) and Doris Brandenburg, who served as a nurse during World War II. He resided in Hawaii with his wife Sybil. The couple has one son. Brandenburg died on February 26, 2024, at the age of 72.

== Assignments ==
- 4th Infantry Division (Mechanized)
  - 1st Battalion, 22d Infantry, 4th Infantry Division (Mechanized)
  - Assistant S-3 (Operations), 1st Brigade, 4th Infantry Division (Mechanized)
- Schofield Barracks, Hawaii
  - Commander of C Company, 1st Battalion, 19th Infantry, 25th Infantry Division
  - Commander, Combat Support Company, 1st Battalion, 19th Infantry, 25th Infantry Division
  - Assistant S-3 (Operations), 1st Brigade, 25th Infantry Division
- Fort Hood, Texas
  - Materiel Officer, Armor Support Battalion (General Support), 13th Support Command (Combat)
  - Executive Officer, Armor Support Battalion (General Support), 13th Support Command (Combat)
  - S-3 (Operations), 1st Battalion, 5th Cavalry, 1st Cavalry Division
  - Executive Officer, 1st Battalion, 5th Cavalry, 1st Cavalry Division
- Fort Benning, Georgia
  - Chief, Bradley Fighting Vehicle New Equipment Training Team
  - Doctrine Writer and Chief, Doctrine Division, United States Army Infantry School
- Germany (June 1991)
  - Commander, 1st Battalion, 15th Infantry, 3d Infantry Division (Mechanized), United States Army Europe and Seventh Army
- Camp H.M. Smith, Hawaii
  - Plans Officer for Programs, Requirements, and Force Structure, J5, United States Pacific Command
- Fort Stewart, Georgia
  - Commander, 1st Brigade, 3d Infantry Division (Mechanized) until August 1998
- Germany
  - Chief of Staff, V Corps
  - Deputy Chief of Staff (Operations), Allied Command Europe Rapid Reaction Corps

== Retirement ==
M.G. Brandenburg's retirement ceremony was held at Fort Shafter, Hawaii, on January 5, 2008, and his retirement became effective on March 1, 2008. The ceremony was hosted by Lieutenant General John M. Brown III, commanding general, United States Army Pacific Command. During the ceremony M.G. Brandenburg was awarded the Defense Distinguished Service Medal as well as letters of appreciation from President George W. Bush, General George Casey, and General Richard Cody.

== Education and awards ==
Major General Brandenburg held a master's degree in management. He was a graduate of the Infantry Officer Basic Course, Armor Officer Advanced Course, Ordnance Officer Advanced Course, Command and General Staff College, and the Air War College.

His awards and decorations include the Defense Distinguished Service Medal, Defense Meritorious Service Medal, Legion of Merit (2 Oak Leaf Clusters), Bronze Star Medal, Meritorious Service Medal (4 Oak Leaf Clusters), Army Commendation Medal, Joint Service Achievement Medal, Expert Infantryman Badge, the Parachutist Badge, and the Ranger Tab.

- Defense Distinguished Service Medal
- Legion of Merit with two oak leaf clusters
- Defense Meritorious Service Medal
- Bronze Star
- Meritorious Service Medal with four oak leaf clusters
- Army Commendation Medal
- Joint Service Achievement Medal
- Expert Infantryman Badge
- Parachutist Badge
- Ranger Tab

Preceded by MG Geoffrey Miller	Deputy Commanding General (Detainee Operations) / Commanding General Task Force 134; 2004-2005	Succeeded by LTG John D. Gardner
