= Mehdi Ghezali =

Former Swedish Guantanamo Bay detainee

Mehdi Mohammad Ghezali
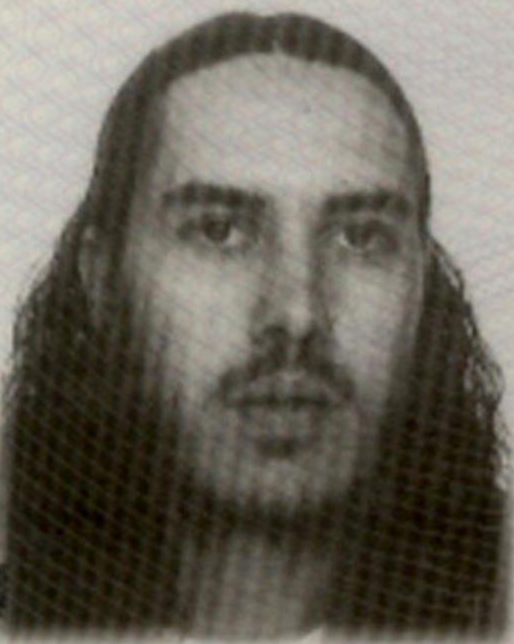
- Ghezali's Swedish passport photo
- Born: 5 July 1979 (age 47); Stockholm, Sweden
- Detained at: Guantanamo
- ISN: 166
- Charge: No charge (held in extrajudicial detention)

Mehdi Mohammad Ghezali (Arabic: مهدي محمد غزالي; born 5 July 1979), in media previously known as the Cuban-Swede (Swedish: Kubasvensken), is a Swedish citizen of Algerian and Finnish descent who was held in extrajudicial detention in the United States Guantanamo Bay detainment camp in Cuba between January 2002 and July 2004. Ghezali claimed to have been "physically and mentally tortured" at Guantanamo.

Prior to his capture, Ghezali attended a Muslim religious school and mosque in the United Kingdom before travelling to Saudi Arabia, Afghanistan, and finally ended up in Pakistan where he was captured. Following his release from detention the Swedish government dropped all charges against him for criminal misconduct prior to his capture.

In December 2002, Pakistan withdrew all charges against Ghezali in connection with his arrest at the Afghan border. Pakistan suspected him of having participated in a prison uprising in Pakistan where 17 people (including seven prison guards) were killed. Ghezali denied having any knowledge of or participation in the prison uprising.

A man bearing Ghezali's passport was one of twelve foreigners Pakistani security officials reported were captured trying to cross into Afghanistan on 28 August 2009. According to the Associated Press Ghezali was "reportedly part of a group of 156 suspected al-Qaeda fighters caught while fleeing Afghanistan's Tora Bora mountains." Ghezali denied any links to al-Qaeda.

In July 2012, a day after the Burgas bus bombing Bulgarian media reported that Ghezali was the suicide bomber. Swedish and Bulgarian officials denied that he was involved in any way and investigators ruled him out as a suspect within 48 hours. Ghezali was featured in the documentary Gitmo – The New Rules of War.

== Early life and travel ==
Mehdi Ghezali was born in Botkyrka, Stockholm, on 5 July 1979 and grew up in Örebro, the son of an Algerian and a Finnish woman. He finished secondary studies in 1999 and trained as a welder. He was suspected of theft the same year, but left the country and could not be questioned by the Swedish police. When police officers visited Ghezali's father he stated that Ghezali had left for Algeria in order to complete his military service; however, Ghezali had traveled to Portugal, supposedly to pursue a career as a football player. Ghezali was apprehended by the Portuguese police in the Algarve region of Portugal on 31 July 1999 for a suspected bank robbery and a jewelry theft together with his partner Stavros Christos Toilos. The bank robbery in Albufeira netted 600,000 euros while the jewelry theft in Playa de la Galé netted 5,000 euros. Ghezali and his partner were released from prison on 12 June 2000 after having spent 10 months in a Portuguese prison without being charged, and returned to Sweden.

Ghezali then traveled to Medina in Saudi Arabia to study at the university. However, he was not accepted and returned to Sweden in March or April 2001 for a brief period before travelling to London where he studied at the madrasah of the Muslim cleric Omar Bakri. He then travelled to Pakistan in the summer of 2001 in order to study at one of the madrasahs situated there. After failing to gain acceptance into any of the madrasahs, he then travelled to Afghanistan, where he, according to his own statements, stayed with a family in Jalalabad. Ghezali stated that: "I lived a simple life, playing with the children and seeing how Afghans lived." "Sweden's security police chief, Jan Danielsson, described Ghezali more as a confused youth traveling the world looking for spiritual fulfillment rather than a terrorist. 'We have no information that indicates he's an al-Qaeda member, much less that he held a leading position,' Danielsson said in an interview."

== Capture and detention ==
After the U.S. military, together with the Afghan Northern Alliance, initiated a bombing campaign on the Tora Bora mountains, a large number of al-Qaeda sympathisers and others in the affected areas fled southward to Pakistan. Mehdi Ghezali was captured by local warlords in Pakistan in the Tora Bora mountains which are close to the border between Afghanistan and Pakistan, and then handed over to the U.S. Armed Forces which transported him to Guantanamo Bay Naval Base on Cuba where Ghezali was held at Guantanamo Bay detainment camp.

In December 2002, Pakistan withdrew all charges against Ghezali in connection with his arrest at the Afghan border. Pakistan suspected him of having participated in a prison uprising in Pakistan, where 17 people (including seven prison guards) were killed. When questioned about the prison uprising at the press conference following his release Ghezali denied having any knowledge of or participation in the prison uprising.

During his stay at Guantanamo Bay, Ghezali was visited by representatives of the Swedish government (February 2002, January and July 2003 and January 2004) and was informed that he had been assigned an attorney in Sweden (Peter Althin) and that his case had been brought up in inter-governmental contacts and had been featured on several occasions in the Swedish media. Ghezali supposedly refused to discuss what he was doing in Afghanistan and Pakistan with the agents of the Swedish government.

On 15 May 2006, the United States Department of Defense released a list of all the individuals who had been held in military custody in their Guantanamo Bay detainment camps. That list gave Ghezali's Guantanamo detainee ID as 166. The DoD listed his place of birth as Stockholm.

== Release ==
After being held as an enemy combatant for 930 days, Ghezali was released into the custody of the Swedish government on 8 July 2004 since he was no longer considered a threat to the United States, since he had no information that was of interest to the American Intelligence Service and since he had not committed a crime which could be proven in a military court. Ghezali was transported home by the Swedish Air Force on a Gulfstream IV jet, at the expense of the Swedish government (estimated at 500 000 – 600 000 Swedish kronor).

Initially, Swedish prosecutors stated that they would press charges against him for crimes committed prior to Ghezali's departure from Sweden, but they were subsequently dropped. There were also threats made against Ghezali, it was perceived that the Swedish government had given Ghezali too much help.

Ghezali was the subject of the English-language documentary Gitmo - The New Rules of War. A film about the Guantanamo Bay detention camp by film director Erik Gandini and Tarik Saleh.

An article in the Boston Globe, published four months after Ghezali's release from Guantanamo, said he was being "monitored by Swedish intelligence agents". The article also said that Swedish security agents have said Ghezali is not a threat. Ghezali has stated in his book that he feels he is being intensely monitored by the Swedish Security Service (SÄPO), both in his home and when he moves around. He claims that the surveillance has caused him to feel depressed.

== Statements after release ==
After his release Ghezali criticized the Swedish government for not helping him sufficiently and denied having been told that he was assigned an attorney or being informed of actions taken on his behalf by the Swedish government, however this was refuted by the Swedish foreign ministry which had documented their meetings with Ghezali. It has been suggested by a psychologist that Ghezali's recollection of events might have been affected by the stress of capture and detention. Ghezali has also made statements describing his stay at the Guantanamo Bay detainment camp. He claims to have been subject to torture such as sleep deprivation and made to sit in an interrogation room for thirteen hours in a row. He is planning a class-action lawsuit against the USA. He has together with Gösta Hultén published a book, Fånge På Guantánamo: Mehdi Ghezali berättar (Prisoner on Guantanamo: Mehdi Ghezali tells his story) ISBN 91-7343-086-2, in which he chronicles his experiences.

== Activities in Afghanistan and Pakistan ==
Ghezali says that he was in Afghanistan on September 11, 2001, living with a normal family in Jalalabad. "I lived a simple life, playing with the children and seeing how Afghans lived." He also said that he had no contact with al-Qaeda.

At a press conference following his return to Sweden, Ghezali said the following about the al-Qaeda leader Osama bin Laden:

Jag känner honom inte som person och därför kan jag inte döma honom. Jag tror inte på det amerikanerna säger om honom. Det är mycket som inte stämmer. (I do not know him as a person and therefore cannot pass judgment on him. I do not believe what the Americans say about him. There is a lot that does not add up.)

== Subsequent appearances ==
On 4 July 2006, Ghezali made his first public appearance since his release at a demonstration held outside the U.S. Embassy in Stockholm, Sweden. Ghezali and approximately 60 others called for the closure of the Guantanamo Bay facility. Ghezali, who declined to answer any questions from reporters, and the other demonstrators also appeared in support of Oussama Kassir, the Swedish citizen at the time being held in the Czech Republic for alleged involvement with al-Qaeda.

== Lawsuit dropped ==
Ghezali is reported to have dropped his suit against the US government. According to The Muslim News: "The Swede eventually found a [U.S.] firm willing to take the case on, but it dropped out shortly before the deadline for bringing a case expired."

== 2009 arrest and release in Pakistan ==
On 10 September 2009, the Swedish television programme Rapport reported that Ghezali was among a group of twelve foreign citizens who had been arrested one week earlier in the Dera Ghazi Khan District in Punjab, Pakistan, on suspicions of having ties to al-Qaeda. Pakistani security officials reported the 12 men were captured on 28 August 2009.

Among the twelve arrested men, three (including Ghezali) were Swedish, seven were Turkish, one was Russian and another one was an Iranian citizen. According to the Pakistani police chief Mohammad Rizwan, the individuals were arrested when they were trying to sneak into the Punjab province through a checkpoint. According to Rizwan, the police had found CDs, exchange money and literature which all indicated links to terrorist activity. Following their arrest, Ghezali and the two other Swedish citizens were moved to Islamabad. Rizwan described Ghezali as "a very dangerous man".

Ghezali's attorney, Anton Strand response to the news that Ghezali was reported to have been captured was: "Yes, I'm surprised by it. One should remember that Ghezali has traveled in that region previously and he has an interest in the region. He is religious and has friends and contacts."

Swedish newspaper, The Local quoted Gösta Hultén, the author of a book on Ghezali, who said that Ghezali's father believed he was on a religious pilgrimage to Saudi Arabia. He reported that Ghezali had called from Saudi Arabia "a few days ago"—which would be about a week after Pakistani authorities reported the ten men were captured. According to Hultén: "The father is very upset about the allegations that Mehdi has ties to al-Qaeda. He has already been cleared from those suspicions once."

On 13 September 2009, Swedish officials confirmed that Pakistan had apprehended three Swedish citizens. But they declined to comment further on their identity.

On 16 September 2009, two of Ghezali's traveling companions were identified. He was reported to have been captured with "28-year-old Munir Awad and 19-year-old Safia Benaouda, and their two and a half-year-old boy." The most recent allegations state the four Swedes were traveling to Miranshah in Waziristan, to meet Zahir Noor, alleged to be a Taliban leader.

Ghezali is reported to have explained that the group were traveling to Lahore to participate in what Swedish newspaper The Local described as "a harmless meeting with a Muslim revivalist movement, Tablighi Jamaat."

The Swedes were released on 10 October 2009. They were placed on a plane to Sweden at 800 GMT. Rehman Malik Pakistan's Minister of the Interior had told Swedish diplomats on 6 October 2009 that he would be receiving a formal report on the Swedes on 7 October 2009, and that he would make a decision about their continued detention at that point. Swedish paper The Local reported one additional anonymous allegation, that the group "were found in a prohibited area near a nuclear power facility." Ulrika Sundberg, the Swedish Ambassador, accompanied the Swedes to their flight. As of the time of their release Swedish officials had still not received a formal report from Pakistan explaining why the four were detained. During a 23 November 2009 press conference, Ghezali's lawyers offered more details of the trip. The asserted that Ghezali and his companions had made a last-minute decision, during a tour of middle eastern countries, to alter their plans to include Pakistan in their itinerary. They were told by their tour coordinator that the visas for travel within Pakistan could be arranged upon their arrival. His lawyers expressed concern that Swedish intelligence officials continued to keep Ghezali under surveillance. They expressed concern that the press speculation that his travel to Pakistan had been inspired by support for Islamic extremism was unfair and unsupported by any evidence.

== Alleged involvement in Bulgarian bombing attack ==
Bulgarian media suggested on 19 July 2012 that Ghezali might have been the suicide bomber responsible for the 18 July Burgas bus attack. The Swedish Security Service responded with a brief statement that Ghezali was not the bomber. Within 48 hours Bulgarian investigators ruled him out as a suspect.

== See also ==
- Gouled Hassan Dourad
