= Embassy of Sweden, Dublin =

Diplomatic mission of Sweden in Ireland

- Location: Dublin
- Address: Kildress House, Floor 2 Pembroke Row, Dublin; D02 H008; Ireland
- Coordinates: 53.33470°N 6.24814°W
- Opened: 1946 (1st time); 2023 (2nd time)
- Ambassador: Inger Buxton
- Jurisdiction: Ireland
- Website: Official website

The Embassy of Sweden in Dublin is Sweden's diplomatic mission in Ireland. When Ireland became independent, Sweden was one of the countries that early established diplomatic relations with Ireland. The embassy has its origins in the legation that was opened in 1946, which in turn has its origins in the Swedish consulate that was opened in 1926. The embassy closed in 2010 and reopened in 2023.

The Swedish embassy in Dublin is tasked with representing Sweden and the Swedish government in Ireland and promoting Sweden's interests. This is done by having a dialogue with Irish representatives and through information and cooperation with the cultural sector, companies and other authorities and organisations.

== History ==
The embassy originated in the consulate that the Swedish government decided to open in Dublin in 1926. A petition was received from the Consul General in London, endorsed by the envoy there, in which the Consul General requested that a consulate be established in the Irish Free State or, if this was not possible, that a trade representative be sent instead. The reasons given in support of strengthening commercial representation in Ireland were considered very weighty by the minister for foreign affairs; however, due to the state's financial situation at the time, he considered it impossible to recommend that special funds be requested for this purpose. Investigations showed that the need for strengthened commercial representation in Ireland could be met to a significant extent by assigning the second vice-consul at the Consulate General of Sweden in London to duty in Ireland. The King in Council therefore proposed that the Riksdag allow the salary allocated for a second vice-consul at the consulate general in London to be used, according to the King in Council's assessment, for the salary of a second vice-consul stationed in Ireland. This petition was approved by the Riksdag.

The Swedish consulate was subordinate to the Consulate General in London and was located from 1930 to 1931 at 5 Upper Ely Place. From 1932 to 1935, it was located at 17 Fitzwilliam Square, from 1936 to 1937 at 67 Merrion Square, and from 1938 to 1946 at 6 Ailesbury Road in Ballsbridge.

In January 1946, the Swedish government decided that the consul in Dublin would be upgraded to a position of legation counsellor, and the holder of the post was given the status of chargé d'affaires en pied. On 25 February 1946, an Irish delegation arrived in Stockholm to discuss, among other matters, the establishment of diplomatic relations between Ireland and Sweden. On 28 June, Ireland's chargé d'affaires, John Aloysius Belton, arrived in Stockholm. Oscar Thorsing was appointed Swedish chargé d'affaires in Dublin from 1 July 1946.

In October 1959, an agreement was reached between the Swedish and Irish governments on the mutual elevation of their respective legations to embassies. In connection with this, Sweden's envoy in Dublin, Leif Öhrvall, was appointed ambassador.

In 2010, the Swedish government decided to close the embassy as part of a policy to shut six European embassies, including those in Bulgaria, Luxembourg, and Slovenia. From 2010, a Stockholm-based ambassador, who regularly traveled to Dublin, was responsible for bilateral relations between Sweden and Ireland. Sweden also maintained an honorary consulate general in Dublin, located at 12 Fitzwilliam Place.

On 3 November 2021, the Swedish government decided to reopen the embassy in Dublin. From 1 February 2023, the embassy was located in temporary premises at the Danish Embassy in Iveagh Court on Harcourt Road, pending a permanent address. On 12 November 2024, the new Swedish embassy was officially inaugurated by Migration Minister Johan Forssell, who unveiled the embassy's coat of arms.

== Staff and tasks ==
=== Staff ===
Two people work at the Swedish embassy. An ambassador and an embassy councilor, also deputy head of mission. In addition, Sweden has an honorary consulate in Dublin that handles consular matters.

=== Tasks ===
The embassy's task is to represent Sweden and the Swedish government in Ireland and to promote Sweden's interests. This is done by having a close dialogue with Irish representatives and through information and cooperation with the cultural sector, companies and other authorities and organisations.

== Buildings ==
=== Chancery ===
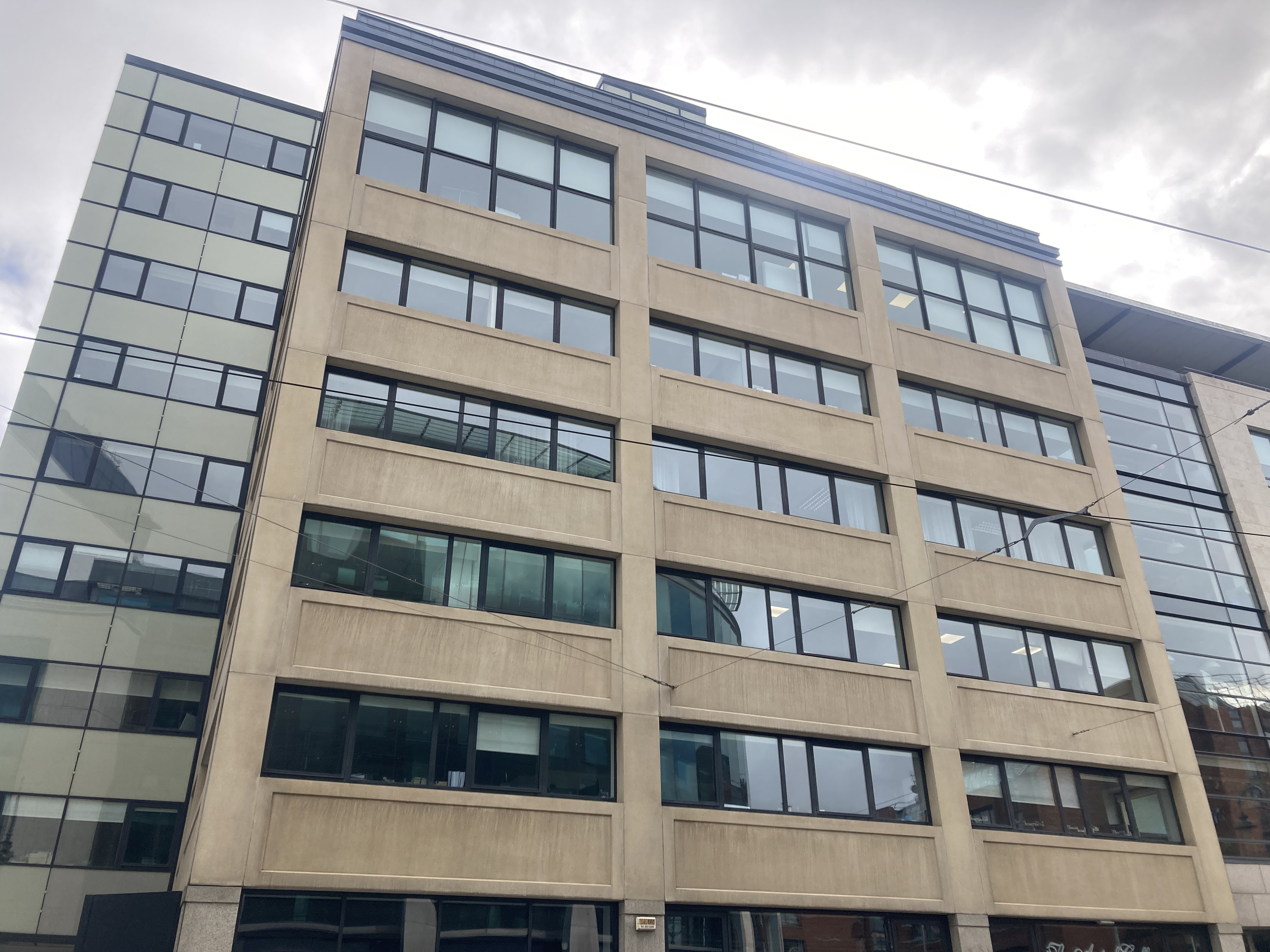
Iveagh Court on Harcourt Road where the Swedish embassy was located in 2010 and from 2023 to 2024.

In 1948, the chancery was located at 79 Merrion Square, Dublin. From 1949 to 1981, it was located at 31 Merrion Road, Ballsbridge. From 1982 to 2009, it was located in Sun Alliance House at 13–17 Dawson Street, Dublin 2. In 2010, the chancery was located at Block E in the Iveagh Court Building, Dublin 2. After the embassy reopened on 1 February 2023, the chancery was once again located at the address Block E, Iveagh Court at Harcourt Road as a temporary solution in the Danish Embassy pending a permanent address. On 12 November 2024, the new chancery at Kildress House at Pembroke Row was inaugurated.

=== Residence ===
The ambassador's residence was built in 1967 and was designed by Swedish architect Sten Lindgren and Irish architect Arthur Douglas. It was located at 25 Greenfield Park in Donnybrook, Dublin 4. The bungalow was set on 1.23 acres and spanned 479 sqm (5,173 sq ft). The residence featured a modest exterior and interior design in a 1960s style. Notable elements included formal function rooms with floor-to-ceiling views of the garden and a large study. The property had two bedroom wings—one for the family, with five bedrooms, and the other for staff. The grounds included gardens, a vegetable patch, and a two-car garage.

In 2008, a downhole heat exchanger system was installed at the residence, a solution that attracted a lot of attention in Ireland. During an opening ceremony on 17 November 2008, Ambassador Claes Ljungdahl showed off the system to colleagues and the Irish press. Among the guests were the director general of the National Property Board of Sweden Bo Jonsson as well as ambassadors from, among others, United Kingdom, France, Germany, the Netherlands and Japan.

In connection with the closing of the embassy in 2010, the 437 square meter house was put up for sale. The starting price was set at €3 million.

== See also ==
- Ireland–Sweden relations
