= Helena Hummasten =

Swedish Muslim leader (born 1959)

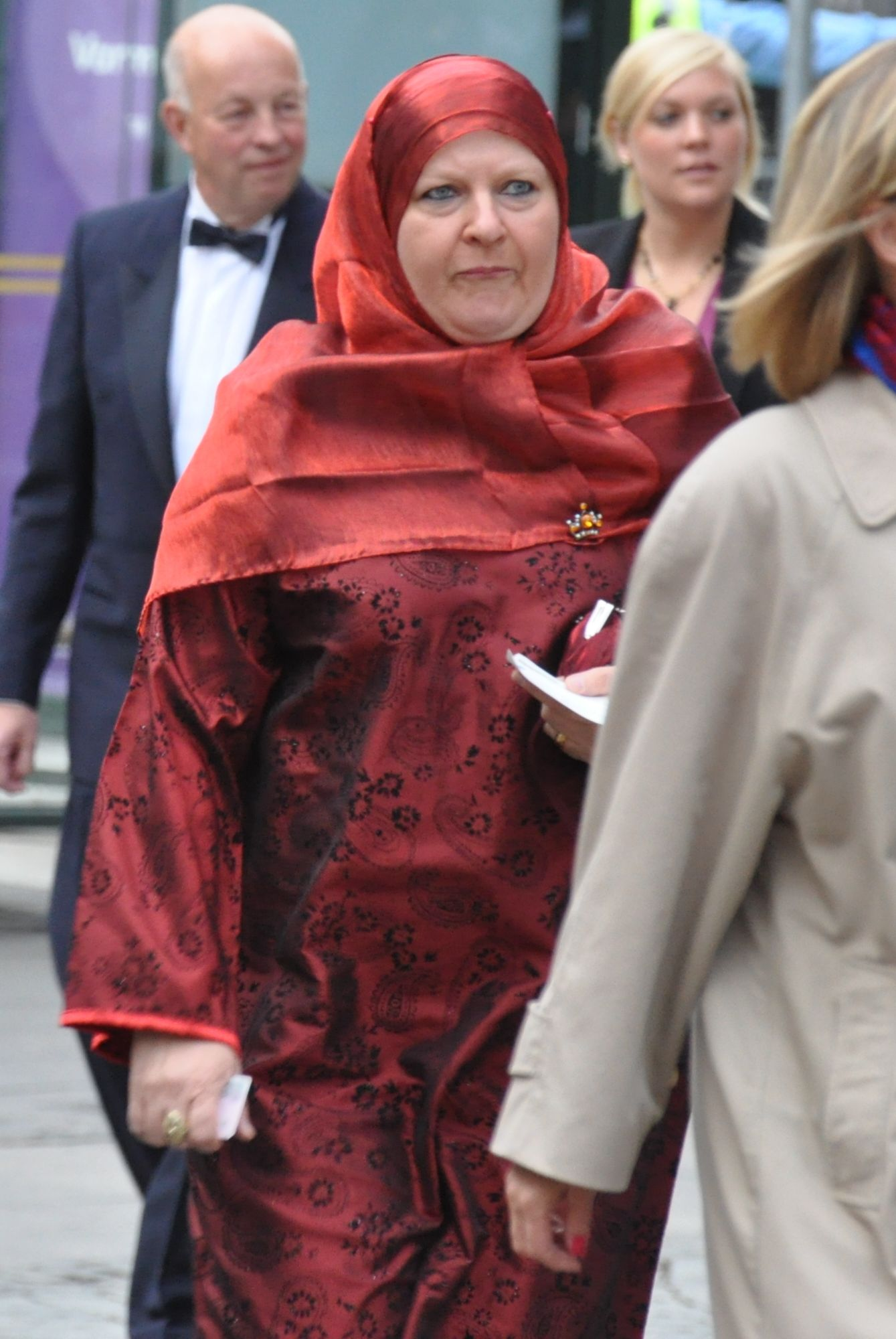
- Born: Helena Fagerdin; 22 May 1959; Haukipudas, Finland
- Citizenship: Swedish
- Known for: Muslim organization leader
- Spouse: Mohammed Benaouda

Helena Hummasten (née Fagerdin; born 22 May 1959), also known as Helena Benaouda, is a former chair of the Swedish Muslim Council.

== Early life ==
Helena Hummasten (née Fagerdin) was born on 22 May 1959 in Haukipudas in Finland. She moved to Sweden in 1979 and almost immediately came into contact with Islam via people in her neighbourhood, converting to that religion. She studied sociology, history of ideas and economics.

== Life in Sweden ==
In the 1990s, Hummasten worked for the non-profit Islamic Information Association, including as a writer for its newspaper Salaam - Islamisk tidskrift (Salaam - Islamic Journal). Between 1996 and 2000 she served as the magazine's editor. She married Mohamed Benaouda, a Moroccan living in Sweden, who died in a drowning accident in 1999. Hummasten became chair of the Ibn Rushd Study Association and between 2004 and 2014 was chair of the Swedish Muslim Council. In this capacity she participated in the wedding of Victoria, Crown Princess of Sweden, and Prince Daniel, Duke of Västergötland. In 2010, she was a deputy on the board of the Muslim Political Forum. She has often been seen in the media in discussions concerning the role of Islam in Sweden. For a time, she was a member of the Feminist Initiative Party but came to consider that Islam was a higher form of feminism.

Hummasten is the mother-in-law of convicted terrorist Munir Awad via her daughter. In December 2010, Awad was arrested in Denmark for plotting a terrorist attack in revenge for the magazine Jyllands-Posten's publication of cartoons against Muhammed. The couple had previously been arrested in 2007 at the Ethiopian-Kenya border because of their activities in Somalia. Hummasten has condemned all forms of terrorism and denied all knowledge of their activities.
