= Abd al Haqq Kielan =

Swedish Muslim cleric (born 1941)

Abd al Haqq Kielan (Arabic: عبدالحق كيلان, born 22 June 1941) is a Swedish Muslim cleric. He is an imam at the mosque in Eskilstuna and at the Islamic Association in Stockholm. He is also chairman of the Swedish Islamic Society and permanent secretary of the Swedish Islamic Academy.

Kielan was born Leif Karlsson in Eskilstuna, Sweden. He first came in contact with Islam during a travel to Morocco in 1963. He converted to the religion in 1984 when he also changed his legal name to Abd al Haqq Kielan, an Arabic name which loosely means "humble servant of the truth".

Kielan caused controversy after an interview in 2004 where he said that "it's doubtful" whether women should be entitled to their own social life outside the home. In the interview he also said that women should not be entitled to marry on their own initiative, and that "according to the Law of Moses, adultery is punishable by death by stoning for both the sexes".
