= Saltvik Prison =

Prison in Sweden

Coordinates: 62°39′13″N 17°53′42″E

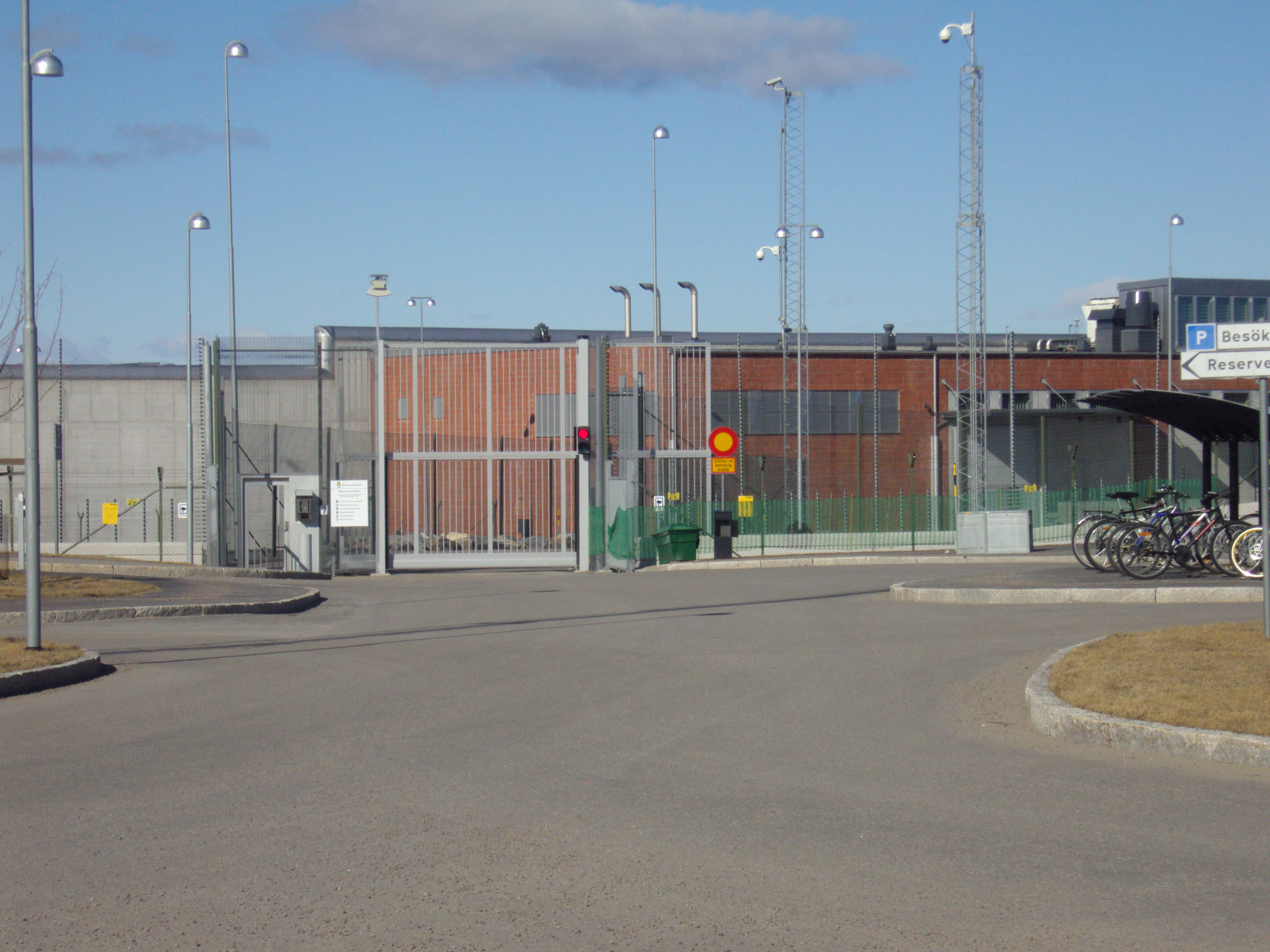

Saltvik Prison (Swedish: Saltviksanstalten or Anstalten Saltvik) is a prison located in Härnösand Municipality, Sweden. This prison has 134 cells.

In December 2003, the Swedish government decided to replace the aging prison in Härnösand. The original replacement project Anstalten Härnösand was cancelled in 2009 and its replacement Saltviksanstalten opened in autumn of 2010.
