= Ricardo Sanchez =

United States Army lieutenant general (born 1953)

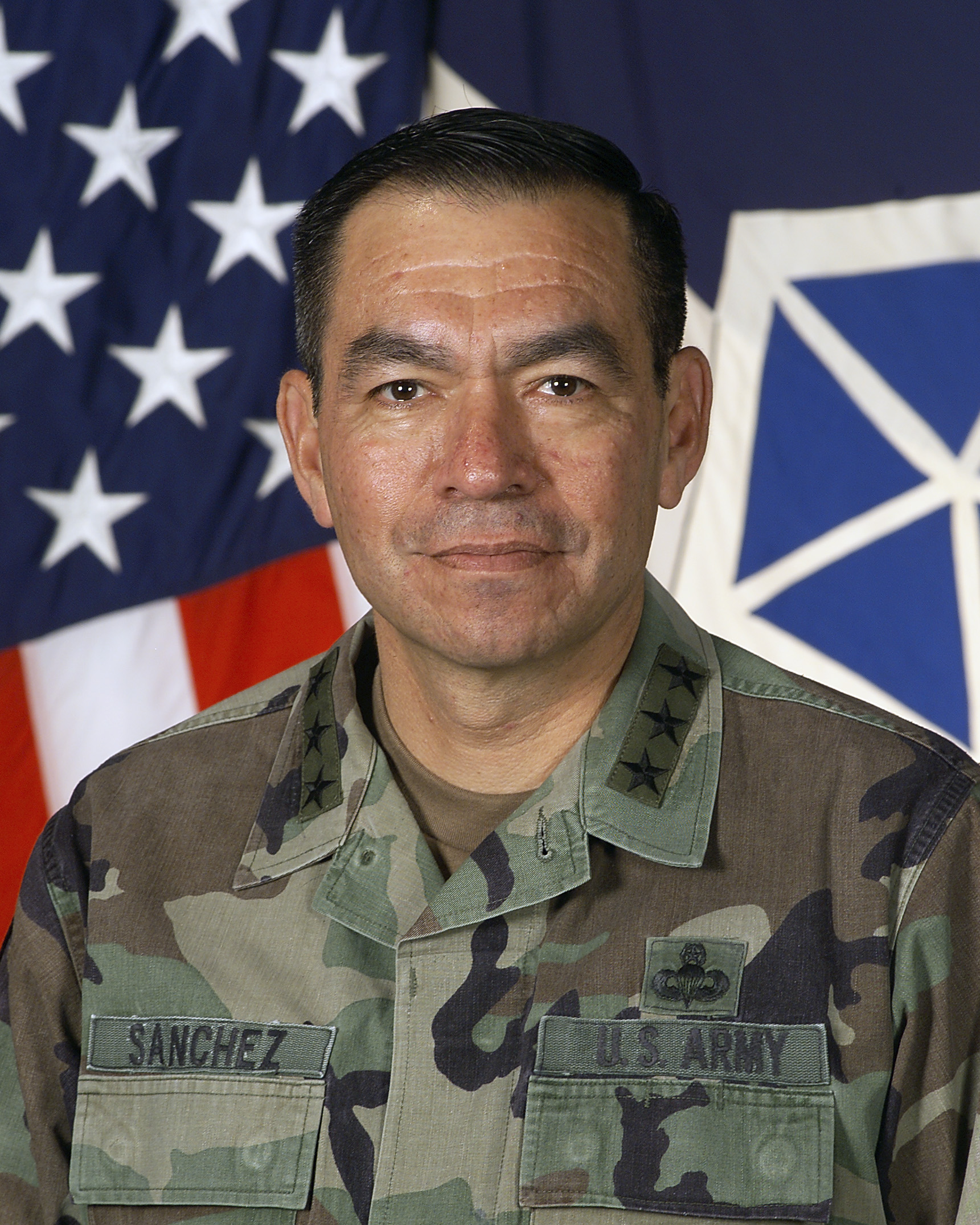
- Sanchez in 2004
- Born: September 9, 1953 (age 72); Rio Grande City, Texas, U.S.
- Allegiance: United States of America
- Branch: United States Army
- Service years: 1973–2006
- Rank: Lieutenant general
- Commands: 2nd Battalion, 69th Armor, 197th Infantry Brigade; 2nd Brigade, 1st Infantry Division; 1st Armored Division; Multi-National Force – Iraq; V Corps
- Conflicts: Persian Gulf War; Iraq War
- Awards: Defense Distinguished Service Medal; Army Distinguished Service Medal; Defense Superior Service Medal; Legion of Merit; Bronze Star

Ricardo Sanchez, also written Sánchez (Spanish: [sãnˈtʃes]; born September 9, 1953), is a former lieutenant general in the United States Army.

== Early life and education ==
Sánchez was born into a Mexican American family in Rio Grande City, Texas. He spent one year at the University of Texas at Austin on an ROTC scholarship, eventually transferring to Texas A&M University-Kingsville, where he graduated in 1973 with a double major in mathematics and history. Sánchez was named a Distinguished Military Graduate (DMG), meaning he was in the top 20% of all ROTC cadets in the nation. He was commissioned as a second lieutenant in the United States Army.

== Career ==
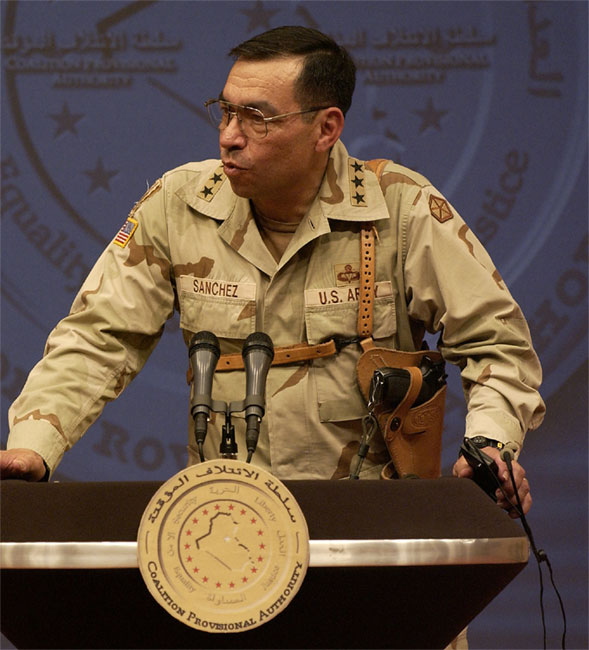
Sanchez speaking at a Baghdad press conference in September 2003.

Sánchez became a platoon leader in the 82nd Airborne Division, stationed at Fort Bragg, North Carolina. By 1977, he had transferred from the infantry to armor. He received promotions regularly and was stationed at posts in the United States, South Korea, Panama and Germany.

In 1991, then Lieutenant Colonel Sánchez served as a battalion commander during Operation Desert Storm, successfully leading his unit of the 197th Infantry Brigade (Mechanized) to Basra without suffering any casualties. Shortly after the Gulf War, Sánchez was promoted to colonel and given command of the 2nd Brigade of the 1st Infantry Division. Afterwards, he served on the staff of U.S. Southern Command, first as deputy chief of staff then as director of operations.

On July 10, 2001, by then a general, Sánchez became commander of 1st Armored Division under V Corps. He held that position for nearly two years, including commanding the division during the invasion of Iraq in March 2003, before assuming command of V Corps on June 14, 2003. On this date he also became commander of Combined Joint Task Force 7, the coalition ground forces in the U.S.-led occupation of Iraq. Much of Sánchez's time commanding 1st Armored Division had been as a brigadier general.

=== Commander of Coalition Ground Forces in Iraq ===
==== June 2003 to June 2004 ====
Sánchez held the top military position in Iraq during what was arguably one of the most critical periods of the war—the year after the fall of the Hussein regime, and the time the insurgency took root and began its counterattack. Highlights during his tenure as commander in Iraq include the killing of Uday and Qusay Hussein, and the capture of Saddam Hussein.

He was in command when the abuse of prisoners occurred most notably at Abu Ghraib prison. Some have been highly critical of the U.S. military's failure to hold senior officers accountable, as blame for abuses at Abu Ghraib and other detention centers was placed only on a few individuals of the lowest rank.

Sánchez was succeeded as commander of coalition ground forces in Iraq by a four-star general: former Army Vice Chief of Staff George Casey. This changeover was part of a larger split in responsibilities as Sánchez's former command, Combined Joint Task Force 7 under a three-star general, was superseded by Multi-National Force Iraq under a four-star general.

==== Disunity in leadership ====
Paul Bremer was the leader of the Coalition Provisional Authority in Iraq. As the appointed authority, Bremer wanted national elections to take place only after the creation of a constitution that included basic principles about the election process. This led to the delay of the elections, which led to serious problems. It was during this time that the power vacuum within Baghdad was being filled by a Shi'a cleric, a factor that Bremer failed to take into account. Insurgency among Sunni civilians first became a problem when American troops first became a presence on Iraqi soil. This insurgency led to Bremer kicking all the Sunni Ba'thists out of the Iraqi administration and the disbandment of the Iraqi army via Coalition Provisional Authority Order 2, which only prompted a harsh response from the American troops. This was a very poor decision on Bremer's part, according to Sánchez, who viewed the insurgency as mostly provoked by Bremer. He is quoted as saying,

When you take a father in front of his family and put a bag over his head and put him on the ground, you have a significant adverse effect on his dignity and respect in the eyes of his family.

There was almost a complete failure to communicate between Bremer, the top civilian, and Sánchez, the military leader. According to journalist Thomas Ricks: "It was very clear they hated each other. They lived in the same palace and didn't talk to each other." This disunity in leadership has been cited as one of the major failures of the first year of the Iraq War.

==== Abu Ghraib scandal ====
Sánchez was commander of coalition forces during a period when abuse of prisoners occurred at Abu Ghraib and at other locations. In a memo signed by General Sánchez and later acquired by the ACLU through a Freedom of Information Act request, techniques were authorized to interrogate prisoners, included "environmental manipulation" such as making a room hot or cold or using an "unpleasant smell", isolating a prisoner, disrupting normal sleep patterns and "convincing the detainee that individuals from a country other than the United States are interrogating him."

On May 5, 2006, Sánchez denied ever authorizing interrogators to "go to the outer limits". Sánchez said he had told interrogators: "...we should be conducting our interrogations to the limits of our authority." Sanchez called the ACLU: "...a bunch of sensationalist liars, I mean lawyers, that will distort any and all information that they get to draw attention to their positions."

Documents obtained by The Washington Post and the ACLU showed that Sanchez authorized the use of military dogs, temperature extremes, reversed sleep patterns, and sensory deprivation as interrogation methods in Abu Ghraib. A November 2004 report by Brigadier General Richard Formica found that many troops at the Abu Ghraib prison had been following orders based on a memorandum from Sanchez, and that the abuse had not been carried out by isolated "criminal" elements. ACLU lawyer Amrit Singh said in a statement from the union that "General Sanchez authorized interrogation techniques that were in clear violation of the Geneva Conventions and the army's own standards."

=== Military career after Iraq ===
In June 2004, Sánchez relinquished command of the Multi-National Force Iraq (MNF-I) to General George Casey, Vice Chief of Staff of the Army. Sánchez returned to Germany, where he continued as Commanding General, V Corps. He was briefly considered for promotion to four-star rank with assignment as Commander, Southern Command; nomination would have required Senate confirmation, which would have been contentious due to the Abu Ghraib scandal. He was not nominated; the position went to General Bantz Craddock.

On September 6, 2006, Sánchez relinquished command of V Corps in a ceremony at Campbell Barracks, Heidelberg, Germany. Sánchez had commanded the corps for more than 3 years; longer than any previous commander in the unit's history. In deference to Sánchez' longevity, he relinquished command to General David McKiernan, Commanding General, US Army Europe and Seventh Army, his higher commander, instead of to a successor.

Sánchez retired on November 1, 2006, culminating 33 years of Army service. Sánchez now lives in his home state of Texas.

In May 2008 Sanchez's autobiography Wiser in Battle: a Soldier's Story was published by HarperCollins Publishers. The book focused mostly on Sanchez's frustrations following his appointment to command coalition ground forces in Iraq in 2003.

=== 2012 U.S. Senate campaign ===
In May 2011, Sánchez announced that he was considering a candidacy for the Democratic nomination for the U.S. Senate seat held by Kay Bailey Hutchison in the 2012 elections. If he ran, Sánchez indicated that his campaign would be guided by the tenets of Catholic faith, as well as his experiences in growing up so poor that members of his family used cardboard to cover holes in their shoes. On December 16, 2011, he announced that he would not run, citing a fire that destroyed his home and other concerns. In a statement to his followers Sanchez stated:

I am very grateful for the strong support and encouragement I have received from supporters across the country and the wonderful Texans I have met in every part of our great state. However, pressing personal challenges, coupled with the recent loss of our home due to fire and lagging fundraising numbers make a statewide election campaign impractical for me at this time.

After extensive consultation with my family, Maria Elena and I have decided to put family first and I will therefore end my campaign for the 2012 U.S. Senate seat as of today.

I am blessed to have made friends with so many great Texans on this journey. Their personal stories and their love for our homeland will continue to inspire me as I look ahead and consider future opportunities for public service. I remain steadfast in the desire to serve both my country and the State of Texas to help bring new, responsible, and fair-minded leadership to our government.

May God Bless Texas and May God Bless America.

=== Criticism of the media and political leadership ===
Speaking to a group of military reporters and editors in Washington, D.C., on October 12, 2007, Sanchez lambasted the media for "sensationalist" coverage and "self-aggrandizement" and expressing the belief that reporters were willing to "compromise [their] integrity" and "display questionable ethics" to get front page stories:

The death knell of your ethics has been enabled by your parent organizations who have chosen to align themselves with political agendas. What is clear to me is that you are perpetuating the corrosive partisan politics that is destroying our country and killing our servicemen who are at war. My assessment is that your profession, to some extent, has strayed from these ethical standards and allowed external agendas to manipulate what the American public sees on TV, what they read in our newspapers and what they see on the web. For some of you, just like some politicians, the truth is of little to no value if it does not fit your preconceived notions, biases and agendas.

Sánchez went on to criticize the partisanship that has characterized America's political leadership on Iraq:

There has been a glaring, unfortunate, display of incompetent strategic leadership within our national leaders. As a Japanese proverb says, "Action without vision is a nightmare." There is no question that America is living a nightmare with no end in sight. Since 2003, the politics of war have been characterized by partisanship as the Republican and Democratic parties struggled for power in Washington. National efforts to date have been corrupted by partisan politics that have prevented us from devising effective, executable, supportable solutions. At times, these partisan struggles have led to political decisions that endangered the lives of our sons and daughters on the battlefield. The unmistakable message was that political power had a greater priority than our national security objectives. Overcoming this strategic failure is the first step toward achieving victory in Iraq — without bipartisan cooperation we are doomed to fail. There is nothing going on in Washington that would give us hope.

Sánchez has become the most senior retired general to criticize American political leadership of the war.

== Military awards ==
Among Ricardo Sánchez military awards and decorations are the following:

=== Decorations and medals ===
Defense Distinguished Service Medal
Army Distinguished Service Medal (with one Oak leaf cluster)
Defense Superior Service Medal
Legion of Merit
Bronze Star Medal (with Oak leaf cluster and "V" device)
Joint Service Commendation Medal
Army Commendation Medal
Army Achievement Medal (with 1 Oak leaf clusters)
Meritorious Unit Commendation
Army Superior Unit Award
Joint Meritorious Unit Award
National Defense Service Medal (with one Service star)
Southwest Asia Service Medal
Kosovo Campaign Medal
Global War on Terrorism Service Medal
Army Service Ribbon
Army Overseas Service Ribbon
NATO Medal
Kuwait Liberation Medal (Saudi Arabia)
Kuwait Liberation Medal (Kuwait)

=== Badge ===
Master Parachutist Badge

== Bibliography ==
On May 6, 2008, HarperCollins Publishers released Wiser in Battle: A Soldier's Story, a memoir by General Sánchez and Donald T. Phillips.

On May 7, 2008, General Sánchez was interviewed by Fresh Air host Terry Gross on NPR where he discussed the Iraq war, his life and book.

Military offices
Preceded by Tommy Franks	Commander Multinational Force Iraq; 2003–2004	Succeeded by George W. Casey, Jr.
Preceded by William S. Wallace	Commander V Corps (United States); 2003–2006	Succeeded by Fred D. Robinson Jr.
