= LGBTQ rights in Ukraine =

- Location of Ukraine (green) in Europe (dark grey) – [Legend]
- Legal status: Legal since 1991
- Gender identity: Transgender people allowed to change gender
- Military: Gays, lesbians and bisexuals allowed to serve
- Discrimination protections: Sexual orientation and gender identity protections in employment (see below)

Family rights
- Recognition of relationships: No recognition of same-sex relationships
- Restrictions: Constitutional prohibition of same-sex marriage disputed
- Adoption: Single people allowed to adopt; same-sex couples banned

Lesbian, gay, bisexual, transgender, and queer (LGBTQ) people in Ukraine face challenges not experienced by non-LGBTQ individuals. Since the fall of the Soviet Union and Ukraine's independence in 1991, the Ukrainian LGBTQ community has gradually become more visible and more organized politically, holding several LGBTQ events in Kyiv, Odesa, Kharkiv, and Kryvyi Rih. In the 2010s and 2020s, positive treatment of LGBTQ people has been on the rise in Ukrainian society.

In a 2010 European study, 28% of Ukrainians polled believed that LGBT individuals should live freely and however they like, the lowest number of all European countries polled apart from Russia. In the 2011 UN Human Rights Council declaration for LGBT rights (A/HRC/RES/17/19), Ukraine expressed its support, voting in favour along with neighbouring countries Poland, Hungary, and Slovakia, while Russia and Moldova voted against it. In 2015, the Ukrainian Parliament approved an employment anti-discrimination law covering sexual orientation and gender identity, and in 2016, Ukrainian officials simplified the transition process for transgender people. In 2021, the Ukrainian Ministry of Health implemented their 2016 proposal to allow gay and bisexual men to donate blood.

In late 2022, parliament unanimously approved a media regulation bill that banned hate speech and incitement based on sexual orientation or gender identity. In March 2023, a parliamentary bill was introduced for civil unions. In 2023 the International Lesbian, Gay, Bisexual, Trans and Intersex Association ranked Ukraine 39th out of 49 European countries in terms of LGBTQ rights legislation, similarly to EU members Lithuania and Romania. Marriage remains limited to heterosexual couples under the 1996 constitution. In a 2024 poll, 70.4% of Ukrainians polled agreed that LGBTQ people should have the same rights as other Ukrainian citizens, an increase from 67.3% in 2023 and 63.7% in 2022. 28.7% approved of civil partnerships without adoption for same-sex couples, 35.7% were opposed, and 25.6% were indifferent.

On 14 May 2025, the government approved a road map for joining the EU, which featured additional LGBTQ-inclusive legislation. (Note: In particular, p. 3.11 of the roadmap envisages the development and adoption of a law determining the legal status of registered partnerships (with a deadline for implementation in the III quarter of 2025), as well as anti-discrimination legislation (with a deadline of the II quarter of 2026).)

== History ==
During early medieval Kievan Rus to the late medieval Grand Duchy of Lithuania no case of execution for one's sexuality is known, contrary to other countries of the time. The maximum punishment during the intermediary high medieval Principality of Kiev and Kingdom of Galicia–Volhynia was church fasting, excommunication, prayer, and mandatory repentance.

The Zaporozhian Sich considered homosexuality unchristian and demonic; Cossacks caught in contact with people of the same sex were trampled into the ground by horses. The status of homosexuals within the Cossacks and the Zaporozhian Sich prior to the end of the 17th century remains undetermined.

Given that in 16–18 centuries most of the territories inhabited by Ukrainians were under the control of different states, different laws were in force in the respective territories. In western Ukraine, which was then part of Polish–Lithuanian Commonwealth, gays were mostly beheaded and publicly hanged, in the east (Hetmanate), which was then under the protectorate of Russia, they were impaled or sent to hard labor in Siberia, and in the south, which was then under the rule of the Crimean Khanate and the Ottoman Empire, gays were brutally killed or castrated.

In Ukrainian villages in the 19th century, group masturbation became widely popular among teenagers, including homosexuals. (секеляння, sekelyannya)

After the February Revolution and the Ukrainian People's Republic (UPR) gaining autonomy in 1917 and declaring independence in 1918, all laws of the Russian Empire were repealed, including the article punishing homosexuality. During the time of the UPR, homosexual relations were legal, but the situation of this population group was not publicly discussed by the politicians of that time due to the War of Independence.

After the formation of the USSR, the authorities initially treated LGBTQ people neutrally, secretly monitoring such people. But after Stalin's rise in later 1920s and Genrikh Yagoda's message accusing homosexuals of "espionage", homosexuality was criminalized in 1933 as part of Stalin's repressions; the corresponding article was introduced into the Criminal Code of the Ukrainian SSR in 1934, and was more often applied to political opponents and dissidents. In January 1936, a commissioner Nikolai Krylenko declared that "homosexuality is a product of moral decay". Later, lawyers and doctors in the USSR also reasoned about homosexuality as a manifestation of "moral decay.".

During the German occupation of Ukraine in 1941–1944, according to official data, the Nazis murdered more than 10,000 homosexuals, some of whom were sent to Nazi concentration camps. Between the 1950s and 1980s, about 25,000 men were officially imprisoned in the USSR.

One of the most famous people convicted of homosexuality in Ukraine was Sergey Paradzhanov, a director of Armenian background. Like other people who did not fit into the norms of the Soviet system, convicted homosexuals in the USSR suffered not only from imprisonment, but also from punitive psychiatry.

Particularly cruel medical experiments were conducted on them (unofficially, of course), often Soviet doctors abused the patient trying to determine the degree of tolerance of a particular person to pain: they cut their tendons, damaged healthy teeth, injected drugs that caused not just degradation of the personality but paralysis of the whole body. In this way, the Soviet system in the 1960s and 1980s turned healthy people who allegedly threatened state security into invalids.

== Legality of same-sex sexual activity ==
Male homosexual sex was legalized in Ukraine in 1991; female homosexual sex was never a crime there. As of 2018, the law relates to same-sex sexual activity when it involves prostitution with people under the legal age of consent or public conduct that is deemed to be in violation of public decency standards. The age of consent is set at 16, regardless of gender and/or sexual orientation.

== Recognition of same-sex relationships ==
Article 51 of the Constitution, adopted in 1996, states that marriage is based on the free consent of a woman and a man, without providing an explicit definition of marriage or an explicitly prohibition of same-sex marriage. Whether this provision constitutes a constitutional barrier to same-sex marriage is subject to differing legal interpretations. No legal recognition exists for same-sex marriage, nor is there any sort of more limited recognition for same-sex couples.

On 23 November 2015, the Government approved an action plan to implement the National Strategy on human rights in the period up to 2020, which include the promise to draft a bill creating registered civil partnerships for opposite-sex and same-sex couples by 2017, among others. However, in early 2018, the Ministry of Justice stated that "the development and submission to the Government of a draft law on the legalization of a registered civil partnership in Ukraine cannot be implemented" due to "numerous appeals from the regional councils, the Council of Churches and other religious organizations".

In June 2018, the Justice Ministry confirmed that currently "there is no legal grounds" for same-sex marriage and civil partnerships in Ukraine.

In the modern world, the level of democracy of society is measured in including through the state policy aimed at ensuring equal rights for all citizens. Every citizen is an integral part of civil society and is entitled to all the rights and freedoms enshrined in the Constitution of Ukraine. All people are free and equal in their dignity and rights. Human rights and freedoms are inalienable and inviolable (Article 21 of the Constitution of Ukraine). The Family Code of Ukraine stipulates that the family is the primary and basic unit of society. The family consists of persons who live together living together, connected by common life, have mutual rights and duties. According to the Constitution of Ukraine, marriage is based on the free consent of a woman and man (Article 51). In conditions of martial law or a state of emergency, the Constitution of Ukraine may not be amended (Article 157 of the Constitution of Ukraine). At the same time, the Government has been developing options for the legalization of registered civil partnership in Ukraine as part of the work on assertion and ensuring human rights and freedoms. According to Article 116 of the Constitution of Ukraine, the Cabinet of Ministers of Ukraine takes measures to ensure the rights and freedoms of man and citizen. In view of the above, I appealed to the Prime Minister of Ukraine with request to consider the issue raised in the electronic petition and to inform about the relevant results.

- Volodymyr Zelenskyy

In July 2022, a petition in Ukraine asking for the legalisation of same-sex marriage reached over 28,000 signatures, and all petitions in Ukraine that reach over 25,000 signatures automatically start the consideration of the President of Ukraine. On 2 August 2022, in response to the petition, Zelenskyy affirmed that democracies were measured by how they ensure equal rights for all citizens, and that the family "consists of persons who live together, are connected by common life, have mutual rights and obligations"; he asked the Prime Minister of Ukraine to review civil partnerships for same-sex couples. However, he said that same-sex marriage could not be introduced during wartime as this would require amending the Constitution of Ukraine, and the Constitution cannot be changed during martial law. The war has spurred efforts to legalize same-sex marriage to ensure gay soldiers' partners are given the same rights and privileges afforded to those in legally recognised marriages, with activists pointing to the service of LGBTQ military personnel as having shifted attitudes towards LGBTQ people.

On 16 November 2024, during a meeting between Ukrainian president Zelenskyy and representatives of the Ukrainian Students Association, one of the student representatives asked him if he would sign the law on registered partnerships. The President curtly replied: "Yes!" (Ukrainian: Так!, romanized: Tak!). The student responded with: "Thank you!", and the audience applauded and cheered the President.

On 14 May 2025, the government approved a road map for joining the EU, in particular, p. 3.11 envisages the development and adoption of a law determining the legal status of registered partnerships with a deadline for implementation in the III quarter of 2025.

The Desnianskyi District Court recognized "existence of actual marital relations" between two Ukrainian men on 10 June 2025, the first such decision for Ukraine. On 22 January 2026, a draft of a revised Civil Code was submitted to the Parliament of Ukraine by Speaker Ruslan Stefanchuk and a large group of lawmakers, intended to "harmonize Ukrainian family law with European Union standards". It introduces amendments that define a family as the cohabitation of a man and a woman and includes a provision to automatically annul marriages if one spouse undergoes legal sex reassignment. The Parliament Speaker has described the proposal as "modern and European". If adopted, the new Civil Code would explicitly exclude same-sex partnerships.

In March 2026, the Supreme Court in Kyiv rejected a challenge to a lower-court ruling that recognized same-sex couples as de facto family.

== Adoption and parenting ==
Single people who are citizens of Ukraine, regardless of sexual orientation, are allowed to adopt, but same-sex couples are explicitly banned from adoption (Clause 211 of Family Code of Ukraine). The law also mentions that people "whose interests conflict with the interests of the child" may not be adopters, but whether this provision has ever been applied against gay adopters is unknown.

Additional restrictions are placed on foreign adopters. Only couples married in a registered different-sex marriage are allowed to adopt children from Ukraine.

However, lesbian couples are given more access to parenting than men, as IVF and assisted insemination treatments are legal.

== Discrimination protections and hate crime laws ==
A law that (if enacted) would have barred employers from rejecting workers based on their sexual orientation was indefinitely postponed on 14 May 2013.

After having failed to gain enough votes on 5 and 9 November 2015, the Ukrainian Parliament approved an amendment to the Labor Code banning sexual orientation and gender identity discrimination at work on 12 November 2015. The law passed on 12 November 2015 was an EU requirement for Ukraine to move forward in its application for visa-free travel to the Schengen Area. Before the vote of the bill, Parliamentary Speaker Volodymyr Groysman strongly spoke out against same-sex marriage. (Note: Extracts from Groysman speech to the Verkhovna Rada are: "Dear deputies: Seven votes stand between us and a visa-free regime. You and we stand for family values, I hear some fake information which says that there may be same-sex marriages in Ukraine. God forbid, this will ever happen. We will never support this". In favor of the bill, Groysman stated "the individual and his rights are at the foundation of our society.")

The Criminal Code of Ukraine contains a number of articles that provide for harsher penalties for crimes committed on the grounds of racial, national, or religious intolerance. Thus, although the concept of “hate crime” is currently absent in Ukrainian legislation, in practice, such a category of crimes is recognized, but only for the three above-mentioned motives. However, if a crime stems from intolerance towards an individual’s or group’s sexual orientation or gender identity, existing legislation does not stipulate heightened punishment, thus failing to classify it as a “hate crime.” In April 2020, a parliamentary draft aimed at amending the Ukrainian Criminal Code to address hate crimes based on sexual orientation and gender identity was introduced. However, in September 2020, the draft was withdrawn from consideration following the Committee on Law Enforcement’s conclusion, citing the absence of terms such as “gender identity of a person,” “sexual orientation,” “intolerance towards gender identity,” and others within Ukrainian legislative texts.

In November 2016, the Ukrainian Parliament initially refused to back the Istanbul Convention, a Council of Europe domestic violence treaty, because its references to sexual orientation and gender violated what many Ukrainian lawmakers said were basic Christian values. The Ukrainian Council of Churches, too, opposed the ratification of the Istanbul Convention citing, “promotion of gender ideology,” which they claimed was threatening to the younger generations’ since it could “distort their sexual identity, popularize the same-sex relations, and spread gender dysphoria.” The Council of Churches did not change their opinion on the Istanbul Convention following the Russian full-scale invasion in 2022, and argued against its ratification, advocating for “alternative ways of combating domestic violence and violence against women.” Despite the opposition from religious groups, eleven years after signing the Istanbul Convention, Ukrainian Parliament voted to ratify the Convention in response to the surge of reports of violence against women since the beginning of Russia’s full-scale aggression. The adoption of the Treaty coincided with Ukraine’s EU membership bid, with some EU members indicating that ratifying the Convention is a precondition for approving Ukraine’s candidacy status. On 18 June 2022, president Zelenskyy registered in Parliament a bill on the ratification of the Istanbul Convention. On 20 June 2022, the Verkhovna Rada of Ukraine supported the ratification of the Istanbul Convention by 259 votes against 8. Ukraine submitted its instrument of ratification on 18 July 2022, so the Convention entered into force in Ukraine on 1 November 2022.

In December 2022, the Ukrainian Parliament unanimously passed a bill that banned hate speech and discrimination against LGBTQ people in mass media. The provision was included in the media regulation bill, which was one of the main requirements for approval of Ukraine’s EU candidacy status. The bill aimed to align Ukrainian legislation with the EU's Audiovisual Media Services Directive (Directive (EU) 2018/1808).

=== Rule of Law Roadmap 2025 ===
On 14 May 2025, the Cabinet of Ministers of Ukraine adopted and approved a roadmap for transformations in the areas of the rule of law upon joining the EU, in particular, p. 3.11 on discrimination against representatives of the LGBTIQ community, the development and adoption of a law defining the legal status of registered partnerships, personal non-property and property rights and obligations of partners, their protection, with a deadline for implementation in the III quarter of 2025.

Also, in the II quarter of 2026, the development and adoption of a draft law aimed at making changes to the Code of Ukraine on Administrative Offenses and the Criminal Code of Ukraine is planned for the purpose of:

- determination of administrative responsibility for manifestations of discrimination;
- committing a criminal offense based on intolerance (including signs of gender identity and sexual orientation) as an aggravating circumstance;
- criminal responsibility for public calls for violence based on intolerance (including signs of gender identity and sexual orientation);

Separately, the drafting of a draft law on amendments to the Law of Ukraine "On Free Legal Assistance" with the aim of providing free secondary legal assistance to victims of criminal offenders based on intolerance and the introduction of registration of such offenders in the Unified register of pre-trial investigations.

== Gender identity and expression ==
Transsexuality is classified as a psychiatric disorder in Ukraine. Sex reassignment surgery is legal, but it is only permissible for those over the age of 25 years.

In 2011, the Ukrainian Civil Code was amended to allow transgender people who have undergone gender affirming surgery to change their name to better reflect their gender identity. In 2014, seven people had undergone sex reassignment surgery, and five people received new documentation.

Since December 2016, new identity documents are issued before surgery is conducted. This followed an August 2016 ruling which ordered changes requested by two transgender people to their passports and all other documents without requiring them to undergo surgery. Transgender individuals who are married or have an underage child can also apply for transition. Previously, all applicants needed permission from a special commission of the Ministry of Healthcare, had to spend 30 days in a psychiatric hospital (usually placed in the same wards with patients considered "mentally ill"), and needed to be "diagnosed with transsexuality"; this is no longer required.

== Military service ==
According to law, homosexuality is not a reason for exemption from the army. A 2007 report wrote that many young gay men tried to avoid call-up to military service, as they were afraid to face unauthorized relations and other difficulties. In 2018, Viktor Pylypenko, who had served in the war in Donbas for two years, became the first Ukrainian soldier to come out publicly. In 2019, several gay soldiers in the Ukrainian army participated in a photo exhibition called "We are here". In 2021, Pylypenko was trying to organize a special unit in the Ukrainian army for LGBTQ soldiers. In July 2021, Pylypenko stated there were 16 open LGBTQ soldiers in the Ukrainian army.

The 2022 Russian invasion resulted in an increased influx of openness and acceptance regarding LGBTQ soldiers in the Ukrainian military. A growing number of soldiers disclosed their identity, believing that they could fight not just for their home country but also against existing stereotypes. The invasion also saw the spread of "unicorn insignia" which Ukrainian LGBTQ soldiers sew onto their uniforms. The unicorn was chosen due to its nature as "fantastic 'non-existent' creature", sarcastically countering claims about there being no LGBT+ individuals in the Ukrainian military.

The non-governmental organisation Ukrainian LGBT+ Military Personnel and Veterans for Equal Rights includes more than 500 LGBTQ soldiers and veterans as of 2025. The organisation defends the rights of LGBTQ soldiers and veterans, and works to support veterans after their return from war. In July 2026, the organisation launched an educational course about LGBTQ people in the military, featuring Pylypenko, Oleksandr Demenko, and others as presenters. The course is available on the Diia.Education platform and is aimed at military personnel, with the goal of improving inclusion and reducing discrimination in the military.

== Blood donation ==
On February 8, 2022, the Ukrainian Ministry of Health quietly enacted new regulations governing blood donation, allowing gay and bisexual men to donate blood. These changes had been initially proposed in 2016. Previously, the Ministry of Health listed homosexuality as a "risky behaviour" for which donors could not give blood.

== Society ==
"I knew one 19-year-old guy who accidentally left his laptop lying around his house and his parents saw messages he sent to his boyfriend. For over a year they didn't let him go out of the house to work or study; they just kept him inside for fear of shame. And that's a familiar story in Ukraine."

— Stas Mischenko, vice-president of the Gay Alliance of Ukraine

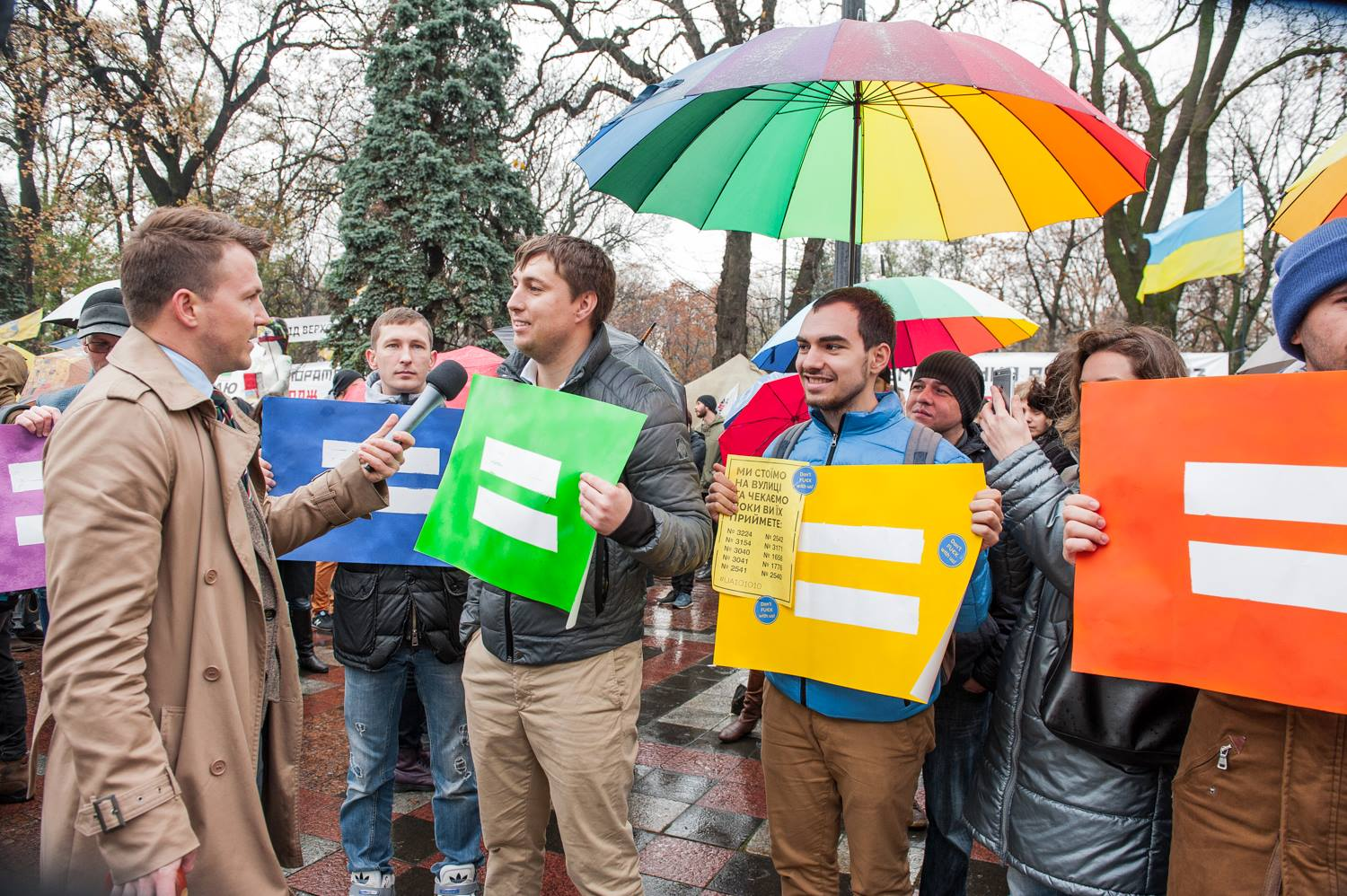
Protest in support of employment equality under the Ukrainian Parliament, 2015

Sexual orientations and gender identity remain taboo subjects in Ukraine. Most Ukrainians affiliated with the Orthodox or Catholic Church tend to view homosexuality and non-traditional gender roles as signs of immorality. Prior to the 25 May 2013 Kyiv pride parade, the head of the Ukrainian Orthodox Church - Kyiv Patriarchate, Patriarch Filaret, stated that people supporting LGBTQ rights would be cursed, and Archbishop Sviatoslav Shevchuk of the Ukrainian Greek Catholic Church denounced homosexuality as a sin tantamount to manslaughter.

Beyond the traditional religious teachings, most Ukrainians grew up with little, if any, comprehensive, fact-based public education about human sexuality in general, let alone sexual orientation and gender identity. The lack of sex education promotes the view of homosexuals as a dangerous social group and as a source of sexually transmitted diseases, especially HIV/AIDS.

During the Soviet era, non-heterosexual sexual relations were labelled as abnormal. Some remnants of the Soviet mentality, which sees sexual topics as taboo and even denies their existence, still exist today.

In 2011, there were frequent reports of harassment, even violence directed at LGBTQ people in Ukraine. Many LGBTQ people in Ukraine reported feeling the need to lie about their true sexual orientation or gender identity in order to avoid being a target for discrimination or violent harassment. Hate crimes against the LGBTQ community are frequently reported on in the international press and, while such violence is not legal in Ukraine, there is a perception by Ukrainians and globally that such violence is frequently tolerated by the Government. The Ukrainian police hardly ever detain attackers. The prevailing intolerance and threats of violence pressure many LGBTQ people to remain in the closet, especially if they are public figures who feel that their career as a politician or celebrity would end if people knew that they are part of the LGBTQ community. (Note: Former Minister of Justice Serhiy Holovatyi has never denied being a homosexual.)

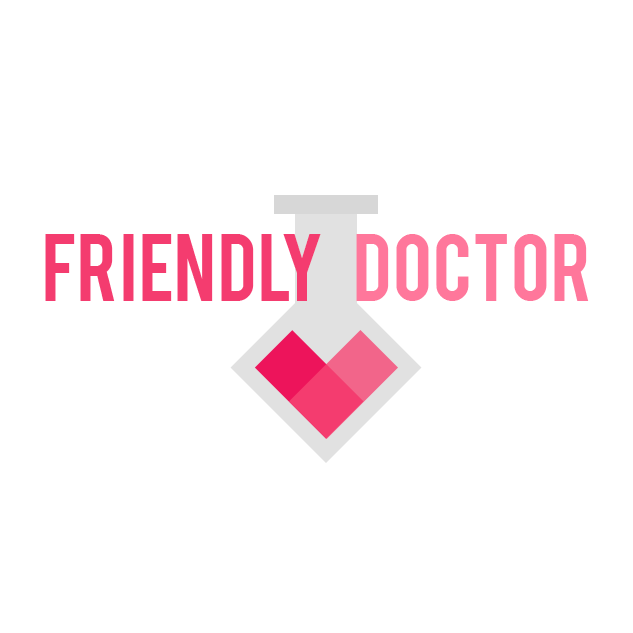
Friendly Doctor is a network of LGBT-friendly health clinics and testing facilities established in 2014.

While prevailing public attitudes are intolerant, the Ukrainian LGBTQ community has gradually become more visible and more organized politically since 1991. The issue of LGBTQ rights in Ukraine has been publicly debated much more, largely as the result of the actions of right-wing nationalists and social conservatives to classify any positive depictions of LGBTQ people or LGBTQ rights as being pornographic.

One of the major movements in opposition to LGBTQ rights in Ukraine is the "ex-gay" movement which believes that lesbian, gay, or bisexual sexual orientations, as well as transgender identities, can be "cured" through therapeutic or religious programs. The largest of these groups in Ukraine is Love Against Homosexuality, who believe that LGBTQ people are "sexual perverts" who need to be cured.

== Freedom of expression and censorship ==
In 1999, the former President of Ukraine, Leonid Kravchuk, stated that there are more important issues than LGBTQ rights to discuss in Parliament and that homosexuality is caused by a mental illness or the corrupting influence of foreign films.

In 2007, the leader of the Parliamentary Committee on Human Rights called gay men "perverts" who must be stopped. Other MPs, namely Communist MP Leonid Grach, have listed homosexuality and lesbianism as evils the state must stop.

A draft law that would make it illegal to talk about homosexuality in public and in the media and to import, distribute, and broadcast video, photo, and audio products that "encourages homosexuality" (with penalties of up to five years in prison and fines for up to ₴5,000 (US$616)) was passed in first reading in the Verkhovna Rada (Ukrainian Parliament) on 2 October 2012. An estimated 20 community activists representing several organizations protested outside of the Verkhovna Rada building during the vote. On 4 October 2012, a second vote was tentatively scheduled for 16 October. This law was deemed homophobic by the LGBTQ community and human rights organisations and condemned by Amnesty International, the European Union, and the United Nations. The Venice Commission concluded in June 2013 that the bill was "incompatible with the European Convention on Human Rights and international human rights standards". In January 2015, the bill was removed from the agenda.

A petition was subsequently started by anti-gay groups, calling for "measures to be taken to stop the propaganda of homosexuality and for defending family values". In March 2018, Ukraine's Anti-Discrimination Ombudsperson removed the petition from the electronic petitions section. By then, the petition had received 23,000 signatures and support from various religious organisations. The Ombudsman described the petition as "anti-freedom", and deleted it due to "containing calls to restrict human rights".

== Living conditions ==
In 1998, the first LGBTQ rights group was created. Our World (Ukrainian: Наш світ) is an LGBTQ community center and human rights advocacy organization. In 2008, Ukrainian LGBTQ rights organizations came together to create a coalition, the Union of Gay Organizations of Ukraine (Рада ЛГБТ-організацій України). The Gay Alliance of Ukraine (Гей-альянс Україна) was founded in 2009.

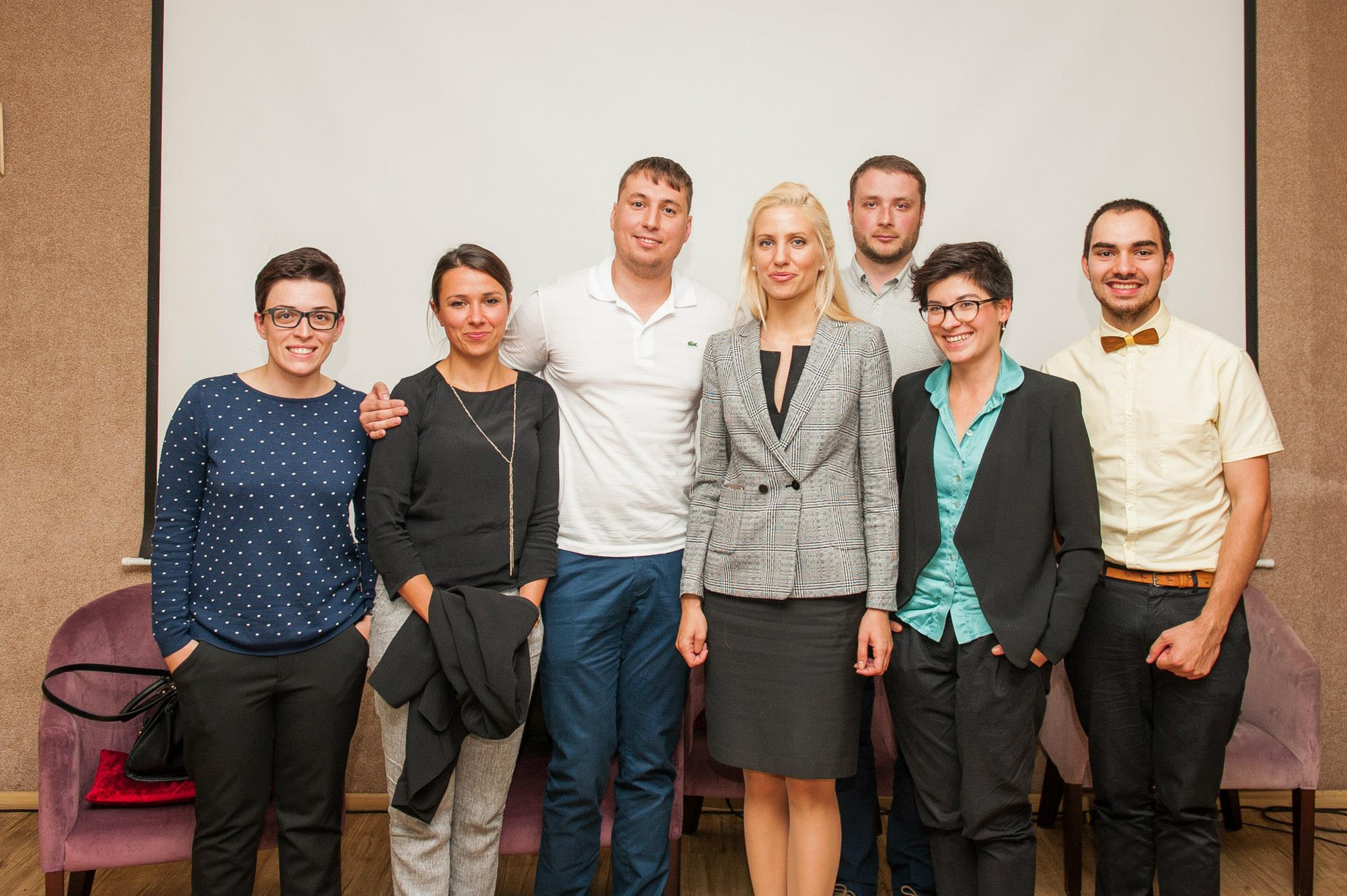
Members of Tochka Opory advocacy group, which was founded in 2009

=== Pride parades and rallies ===
==== 2003 to 2015 ====
In September 2003, the first, albeit small, public pride parade was held in Kyiv.

In May 2008, Ukrainian LGBTQ groups were prevented from marking the International Day Against Homophobia after a last-minute intervention by authorities who told organisers that due to the likelihood of friction the events would have to be canceled. Roman Catholics, Evangelic Christians, Seventh-day Adventists, Eparchy of Christianity and Baptist and the Union of Independent Orthodox churches had asked local authorities to forbid any action by representatives of sexual minorities.

In May 2012, a Kyiv gay pride parade was cancelled by its participants because they feared for their safety. Two gay rights activists were beaten up and tear-gassed by a group of youths after pride goers were evacuated by police escort.

On 23 May 2013, a Ukrainian court satisfied a petition by Kyiv city authorities to ban the holding of any events, other than those envisaged by the program for the celebration of Kyiv Day (in the central part of the city); in doing so it de facto banned the gay pride parade in Kyiv that was planned for 25 May. The pride event was then changed to "a private event outside of the central part of Kyiv". On this day on a narrow pathway near Pushkin Park and Shuliavska metro station, about 50 people gathered and marched. Among them, at least 10 were from Munich (Germany), including Vice Mayor Hep Monatzeder, and some were from Sweden. They marched under the protection of 1,500 policemen, 13 of the about 100 anti-gay protesters were arrested and no physical (Note: A few religious anti-gay protesters, disguised as journalists, attempted to rip the banners and placards of the paraders.) violence occurred. After one hour, the protesters who took part in the parade were evacuated from the area. In an attempt to avoid revenge attacks, they then changed their clothes and switched modes of transport multiple times.

A procession organised by gay rights activists took place in central Kyiv on 11 January 2014, amidst the Euromaidan protests.

The Kyiv gay pride parade was again cancelled on 5 July 2014 after the police failed to guarantee its protection. It would have been a small, closed march several kilometers outside Kyiv.

==== 2015 to 2022 ====
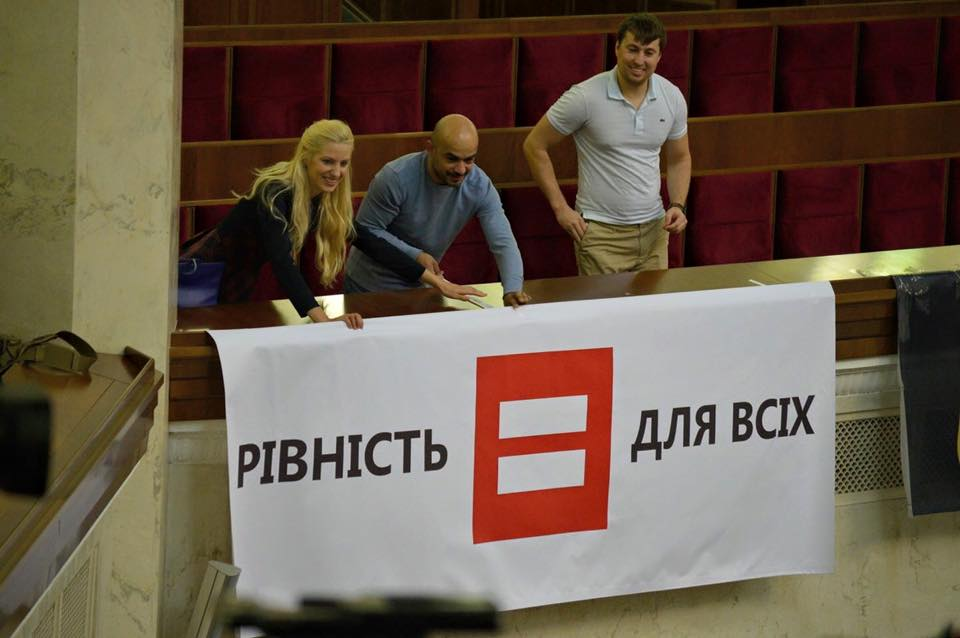
Equality for Everyone banner in the Ukrainian Parliament, 2015. MPs Svitlana Zalishchuk and Mustafa Nayyem, with (on the right) activist Bogdan Globa

On 6 June 2015, Ukraine's second pride parade was held in Kyiv. The march was finished in less than half an hour. The number of police protection far outnumbered the pride participants. The venue for the march was only disclosed to the march's participants that had registered on its website. During the march, five policemen were injured in scuffles after unidentified people had attacked the rally with smoke bombs and stones. One police officer was admitted to intensive care. 25 anti-gay activists were arrested. Members of Parliament Svitlana Zalishchuk and Serhiy Leshchenko attended the march along with the Swedish Ambassador to Ukraine, Andreas von Beckerath, and other foreign diplomats. The organizers urged the pride participants to disperse in small groups and not to use the Kyiv Metro. On 4 June 2015, Kyiv Mayor Vitali Klitschko had, as in the previous year, asked to cancel the pride citing "danger of provocations". On the other hand, Ukrainian President Petro Poroshenko stated on 5 June 2015 that there was no reason to prevent the march.

On 12 June 2016, Ukraine's third pride parade, dubbed the Equality March, was held in Kyiv without incidents. The march of 1,500 people lasted about half an hour and was guarded by more than 5,500 police officers and 1,200 members of the National Guard. 57 people were detained for aggressive behaviour.

On 13 August 2016, an LGBTQ Equality March was held in Odesa. The march of 50 people lasted about half an hour and was guarded by more than 700 police officers. Twenty men, who were trying to break through to the event, were detained.

In May 2017, LGBTQ activists organised a rally in the city of Kharkiv. Thirty people attacked the participants and police officers, injuring two.

On 18 June 2017, Kyiv's fourth pride parade, again dubbed Equality March, was held in the city without major incidents with 6 people detained for trying to breach the security cordon.

On 17 June 2018, Kyiv's fifth pride parade was held in the city centre. It lasted less than one hour and was, according to Kyiv police attended by 3,500 people, while the organizers said there were at least 5,000 participants. No serious incidents occurred during the march. Clashes did break out when 150 far-right protesters who tried to block off the route were dispersed by riot police. 57 protesters were detained.

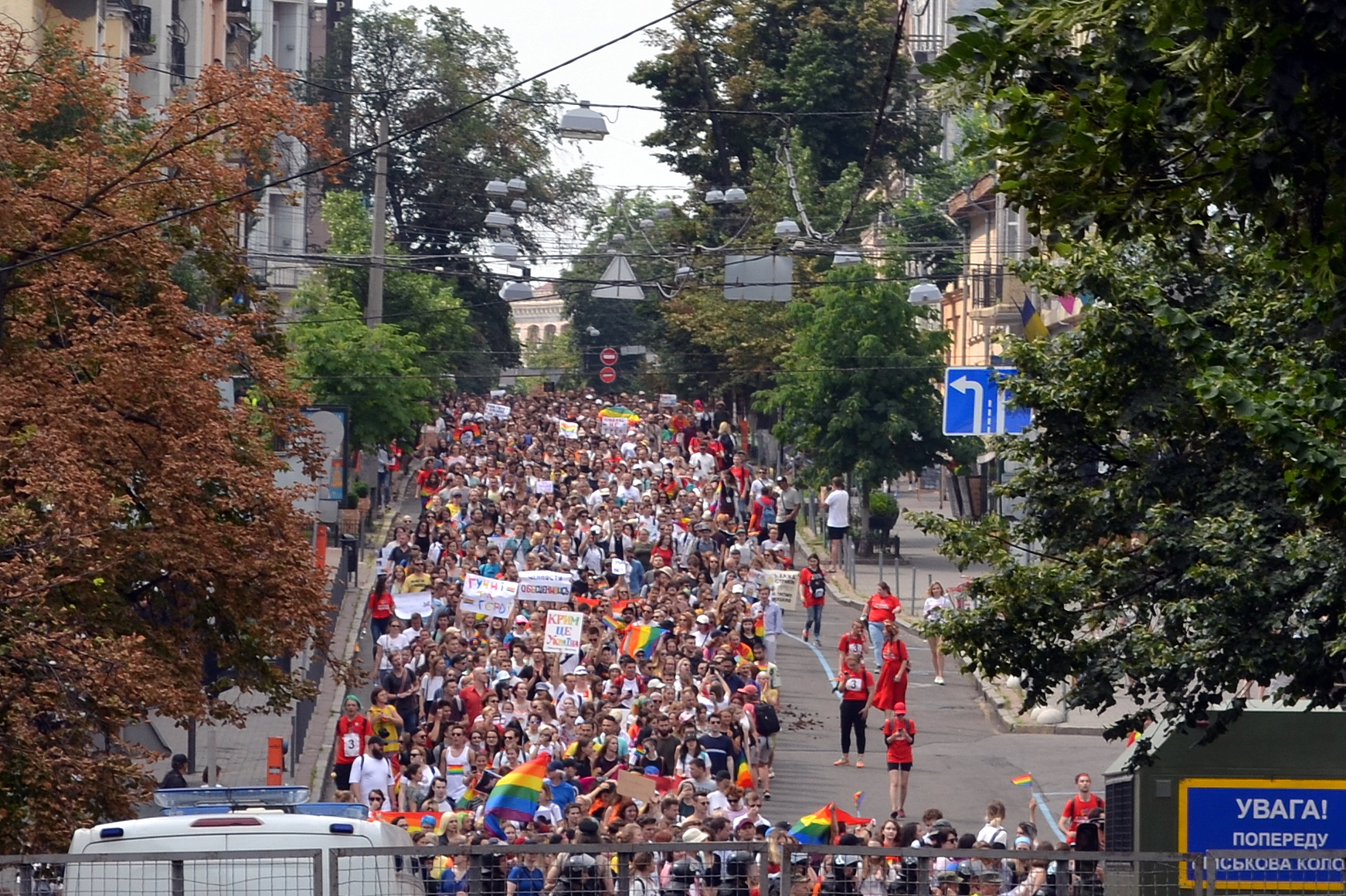
Kyiv Pride 2019

In June 2019, an estimated 8,000 people marched at the Kyiv Pride parade, among them politicians and foreign diplomats. The event was peaceful. Police foiled a plot to throw condoms filled with human excrement at marchers. President Volodymyr Zelenskyy, who took office in May 2019, urged the police to prevent violence and safeguard the safety of the participants.

In August 2019, about 300 people took part in the LGBTQ Equality March in Odesa. A number of diplomatic missions took part, as well as guests from Canada, Germany, the United States and other countries. Some small clashes were reported. The marchers were protected by 500 police officers, who arrested three people for minor hooliganism.

In September 2019, an estimated 2,000 people participated in Kharkiv's first pride march. The march went forward despite Mayor Hennadiy Kernes threatening to file legal action against the organizers. At the end of the march, clashes between the police and anti-pride march right-wing demonstrators saw two police agents being treated for pepper spray-related injuries. After the march ended, far-right counter demonstrators gathered in Shevchenko park hoping to attack LGBTQ activists attempting to leave on foot. One march participant had to be rescued by a press photographer.

On 30 August 2020, an LGBTQ Equality March in Odesa ended in a fight between members of the LGBTQ community and opponents of the march. Sixteen people were detained and two police officers were injured. A 13 September 2020 "AutoPride rally" in Kharkiv passed without incidents. In Zaporizhzhia a pride parade was held on 20 September 2020 on the city's Festival Square; although pride goers were harassed by anti-LGBTQ activists, no injuries were reported. There were twice as many pride opponents as there were pride goers (reportedly 500 people).

On 22 May 2021 a Trans-March, organised by Insight and partners KyivPride and Cohort, took place in Kyiv. The march was attended by about 150 participants, protected by 400 police officers and there was a counter-demonstration with approximately 200 opponents. During the march, several people tried to attack the marchers, but the police quickly prevented that.

On 29 August 2021 violent clashes broke out between police and the far-right nationalist group Tradition and Order during an LGBTQ Equality March in Odesa. 29 law enforcement officers were injured, mostly from reactions to tear gas, and 51 members of Tradition and Order were arrested.

On 12 September 2021 an LGBTQ Equality March, organised by KharkivPride, took place in Kharkiv. According to KharkivPride, up to 3,000 people took part in the march.

The KyivPride-2021 Equality March took place in Kyiv on 19 September 2021 with between 5,000 and 7,000 participants. Several hundred activists opposing the march held their own rally, no clashes between the two sides took place. The KyivPride-2021 Equality March was attended by the Ambassador of Sweden to Ukraine Tobias Thyberg, MP of the Voice faction Inna Sovsun and deputy of the Kyiv City Council from the Servant of the People party faction Yevhenia Kuleba.

==== Since the 2022 Russian invasion ====
Due to the 2022 Russian invasion of Ukraine causing many Ukrainians to flee the country and Russian aerial bombing campaigns, KyivPride 2022 was held in Warsaw, Poland, in a combined event with the city's Equality Parade on June 25. In addition to LGBTQ rights, the march also focused on supporting Ukraine and calling for peace.

The first Kyiv Pride march in Ukraine itself since the 2022 Russian invasion took place on 16 June 2024 in Kyiv. About 500 participants joined. Due to safety concerns only 500 people were allowed to attend. The tightly policed march was stopped by Ukrainian police after travelling only a few metres due to safety fears. The police had warned that radical, anti-LGBTQ+ groups had also organised gatherings in the city. Due to the possibility of these threats and the frequent missile strikes on Kyiv by the Russian Armed Forces the event was held close to a metro station for shelter in the event of an air raid warning.

The second Kyiv Pride march in Kyiv itself since the 2022 invasion took place on 14 June 2025. 1,500 participants, including foreign diplomats, took part. A nearby counterprotest was held and the march was surrounded by police and restricted in their route, but no violent incidents were reported.

=== Attacks on the LGBTQ community ===
On 22 June 2012, a man approached LGBTQ activist Taras Karasiichuk saying, "Are you a fag?" and then kicked him in the head and jaw. Human Rights Watch said authorities should treat the incident as a hate crime.

An Amnesty International expert on Ukraine stated in 2013 that "people have been beaten and in one case murdered because of their real or perceived sexual orientation or gender identity. Most of these crimes have not been properly investigated and have gone unpunished."

On 6 July 2014, a group of 15-20 neo-Nazis mounted an attack against the gay club "Pomada" (Lipstick) in Kyiv. The attackers wore camouflage and balaclava (ski masks) and threw a smoke grenade and firecrackers.

On 29 October 2014, Kyiv's oldest movie theater, Zhovten, caught fire when a smoke grenade was thrown into it during the screening of the French film Summer Nights, which was shown as part of an LGBTQ program at the Molodist Film Festival. None of the roughly hundred people attending were injured. Police arrested two suspects, one of whom said that the intent was not to burn the building down, but to make a protest against films with an LGBTQ theme.

Oleksandr Zinchenko, an Our World representative, stated on 3 June 2015 that 40 hate crimes had been committed against LGBTQ people in 2014 and that about 10 such crimes had already happened in 2015.

=== Persecution in Russian-occupied territory ===
LGBTQ people have faced active persecution in the parts of the country under Russian occupation since 2014.

Lesbian, gay, bisexual, and transgender individuals have complained about an increase of attacks in the self-proclaimed Donetsk People's Republic in Eastern Ukraine. On 8 June 2014, ten armed people attacked the gay club Babylon in the city of Donetsk. They fired blank cartridges into the air for intimidation and declared that there should not be gay clubs in the city, after which they robbed the visitors. In 2015, the Deputy Minister for Political Affairs of the Donetsk People's Republic stated: "A culture of homosexuality is spreading… This is why we must kill anyone who is involved in this." Many volunteers who took in refugees from territories controlled by the Donetsk People's Republic refused to host LGBTQ people.

In July 2015, the head of the Donetsk People's Republic, Alexander Zakharchenko, said he respected Ukraine's far-right party Right Sector "when they beat up the gays in Kyiv and when they tried to depose Poroshenko".

== Public opinion ==
In a 2007 country-wide survey by the Institute of Sociology, 16.7% disagreed strongly and 17.6% disagreed with the following statement: Gay men and lesbians should be free to live their own life as they wish. 30.2% agreed strongly and agreed with the statement, making it the lowest rating of agreed strongly and agreed with the statement of 24 countries investigated.

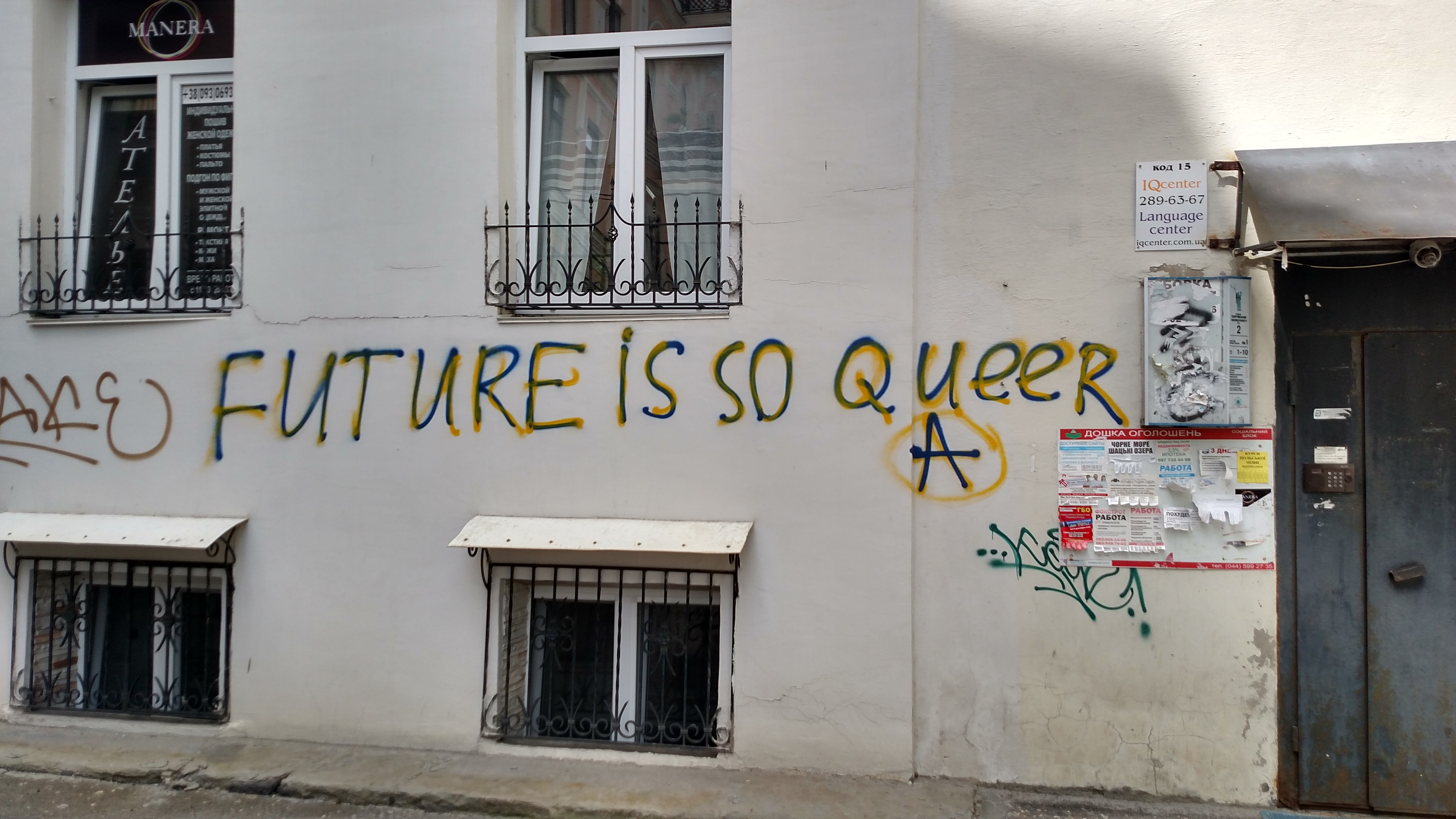
Graffiti in Kyiv (photographed in June 2016), Ukraine that reads "future is so queer"

In a December 2007 survey by Angus Reid Global Monitor, 81.3% of Ukrainians polled said that homosexual relations were "never acceptable", 13% answered "sometimes acceptable" and 5.7% "acceptable". Of all the behaviors listed, homosexuality was viewed as the third worst after shoplifting and drunk driving. Notably, more people viewed this as never acceptable than adultery (61.5% never, 29.3% sometimes), traffic rule violation (70.2% never, 25.6% sometimes), pollution (73.3% never, 22.4% sometimes), tax evasion (48.5% never, 37.5% sometimes), deception for the sake of profit (48.3% never, 41.6% sometimes), as well as a list of other things including abortion, premarital sex, complaining to authorities about a friend who has stolen something, etc.

In another Angus Reid Global Monitor survey, this one in June 2007, on a long list of possible social reforms in the country, legalization of same-sex marriage only received 4.7% of the vote, the lowest by far (the next lowest being light drugs, at 7.1%).

A December 2010 Gorshenin Institute poll stated that the "Ukrainian attitude to sexual minorities" was "entirely negative" for 57.5%, "rather negative" for 14.5%, "rather positive" for 10% and "quite positive" for 3%.

A May 2013 poll by GfK Ukraine found that 4.6% of respondents were in favour of same-sex marriage and 16% supported other forms of recognition, while 79.4% were opposed to any form of recognition.

A summer 2015 survey by the British Council revealed that one in five of Ukrainian youth (Note: The survey was not held in Crimea, Donetsk and Luhansk.) would be uncomfortable with having lesbian and gay people as friends.

According to a 2015–16 survey by the Pew Research Center, 86% of Ukrainian respondents believed that homosexuality should not be accepted by society.

In May 2016 in a survey by Nash Svit Center, conducted by the Kyiv International Institute of Sociology, only 3,3% of respondents claimed to be positive about LGBT people in general, while 60,4% were negative and 30,7% were indifferent. When asked about equal rights, 33,4% agreed that LGBT members should have the same rights as others, while 45,2% disagreed and 21,3% could not or did not want to answer.

On 25 September 2016, European scientific studies detected that Ukrainians displayed higher levels of homophobia than Albanians and Italians, confirming the central role of cultural differences in homophobic attitudes.

A Pew Research Center poll published in May 2017 suggested that 9% of Ukrainians were in favor of same-sex marriage, while 85% opposed it. According to the poll, younger people were more likely than their elders to favor legal same-sex marriage (11% vs. 7%).

According to a 2017 poll carried out by ILGA, 56% of Ukrainians agreed that gay, lesbian and bisexual people should enjoy the same rights as straight people, while 21% disagreed. Additionally, 59% agreed that they should be protected from workplace discrimination. 20% of Ukrainians, however, said that people who are in same-sex relationships should be charged as criminals, while 55% disagreed. As for transgender people, 60% agreed that they should have the same rights, 58% believed they should be protected from employment discrimination and a plurality of 43% believed they should be allowed to change their legal gender.

In May 2022 in a survey by Nash Svit Center, also conducted by the Kyiv International Institute of Sociology, 12.8% of respondents claimed to be positive about LGBT people in general, while 38.2% were negative and 44.8% indifferent. When asked about equal rights, 63.7% agreed that LGBT members should have equal rights, while 25.9% disagreed and 10.4% could not or did not want to answer. Nash Svit Center believes that acceptance of LGBT people in Ukraine has "Dramatically improved" compared to results from their similar survey from 2016. It might have been a result of Russian invasion, carried out under the slogans of defending traditional values and fighting gay parades.

One study suggests that the norms of male prisons, which evolved as means of self-regulation in numerous post-Soviet nations, contribute to anti-gay sentiments. This is attributed to the significant portion of individuals who experienced the Soviet Union's penitentiary system.

According to a poll conducted in January 2023 by the National Democratic Institute with the help of the Kyiv International Institute of Sociology, 56% of Ukrainians agreed that same-sex couples should have the right to register their relationship in the form of a civil partnership, while 24% disagreed. 44% supported same-sex marriage, 36% were against it. 30% supported the adoption of children by same-sex couples, 48% were against. The role of LGBT community members in the Ukrainian military following the 2022 Russian invasion has been credited with shifting public attitudes toward same-sex partnerships in Ukraine.

In a June 2024 survey by the Kyiv International Institute of Sociology when asked if LGBTQ people should have the same civil liberties and constitutional rights as all Ukrainians 70% of respondents said "yes." People polled were asked if they would support a (at the time not existing) possibility for LGBTQ couples legal civil partnership for LGBTQ couples (minus the ability to adopt); 28.7% of respondents said "yes", while 35.7% said "no" and 25.6% stated "indifference." The poll also inquired about the attitudes (of those polled) toward LGBTQ people; 47.3% stated "indifference" and 32.1% stated "negative." The pollster concluded that the support for LGBTQ rights in Ukraine has continued to improve, and that the younger demographic and women were generally more positive about LGBTQ issues.

== Summary table ==
Same-sex sexual activity legal	Yes (Since 1991)
Equal age of consent (16)	Yes (Since 2001)
Anti-discrimination laws in employment	Yes (Since 2015)
Anti-discrimination laws in the provision of goods and services	No
Anti-discrimination laws in all other areas (including indirect discrimination, hate speech)	Yes (Since 2023)
Same-sex marriage(s)	No (Constitution prohibits same-sex marriage is disputed)
Recognition of same-sex couples	No (Pending since 2022)
Single LGBTQ people allowed to adopt	Yes
Stepchild adoption by same-sex couples	No
Joint adoption by same-sex couples	No
LGBTQ people allowed to serve openly in the military	Yes
Right to change legal gender	Yes (Since 2011)
Access to IVF for lesbians	Yes
Automatic parenthood for both spouses after birth	No
Conversion therapy banned on minors	No
Homosexuality declassified as an illness	Yes (Since 1991)
Transsexuality declassified as an illness	No
Commercial surrogacy for gay male couples	No
MSMs allowed to donate blood	Yes (Since 2016)

== See also ==
- LGBTQ rights in Europe
- Human rights in Ukraine
- Sexual orientation and military service
