= Maciej Lang =

Polish political scientist and diplomat

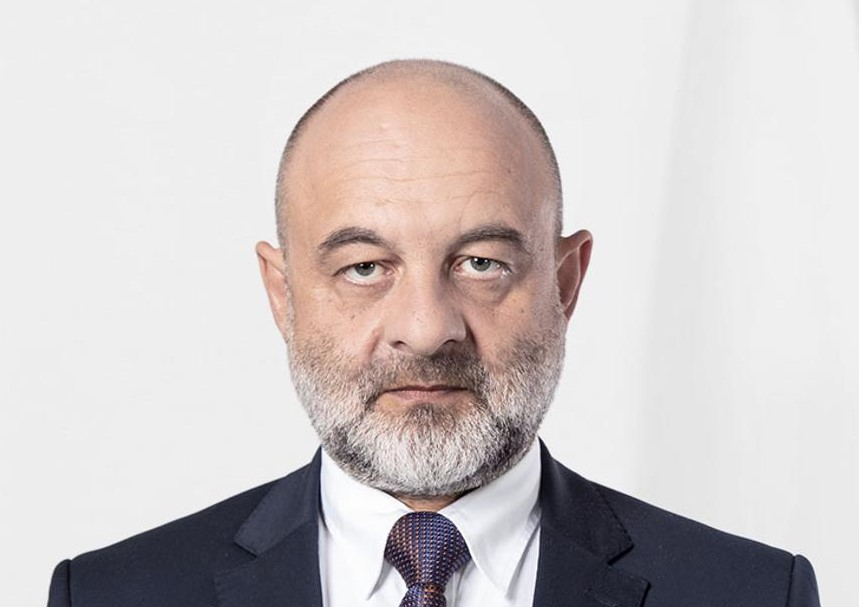

Poland Ambassador to Turkey
- Incumbent
- Assumed office 2023
- Preceded by: Jakub Kumoch

Poland Ambassador to Romania
- In office July 29, 2020 – February 5, 2023
- Appointed by: Andrzej Duda
- President: Klaus Iohannis
- Preceded by: Marcin Wilczek
- Succeeded by: Paweł Soloch

Undersecretary of State in the Ministry of Foreign Affairs
- In office 2016–2018
- Appointed by: Jacek Czaputowicz

Poland Ambassador to Turkey
- In office 2015–2016
- Appointed by: Andrzej Duda
- President: Recep Tayyip Erdoğan
- Preceded by: Mieczysław Cieniuch
- Succeeded by: Jakub Kumoch

Poland Ambassador to Kazakhstan
- In office 2009–2012
- Appointed by: Bronisław Komorowski
- President: Nursultan Nazarbayev
- Preceded by: Jacek Kluczkowski
- Succeeded by: Selim Chazbijewicz

Poland Ambassador to Afghanistan
- Appointed by: Lech Kaczyński
- President: Hamid Karzai
- Preceded by: Jerzy Więcław
- Succeeded by: Piotr Łukasiewicz

Poland Ambassador to Turkmenistan
- In office 2007–2009
- Appointed by: Lech Kaczyński
- President: Gurbanguly Berdimuhamedow
- Preceded by: Witold Śmidowski
- Succeeded by: Stefan Radomski

Poland Charge d'Affairs to Greece
- In office 2006–2007
- Appointed by: Stefan Meller
- Preceded by: Maciej Górski
- Succeeded by: Michał Klinger

Personal details
- Born: 1968 (age 57–58) Piotrków Trybunalski, Poland
- Education: University of Warsaw
- Profession: Diplomat, historian

Maciej Przemysław Lang (born in 1968 in Piotrków Trybunalski) is a Polish political scientist, journalist and diplomat with a PhD in Humanities. He has served as the Ambassador of the Republic of Poland to Turkmenistan (2007–2009), Afghanistan (2009–2012), Kazakhstan (2015–2016), Turkey (2016–2018, since 2023), and Romania (2020–2023), and Undersecretary of State in the Ministry of Foreign Affairs for Security, Asian Policy, American Policy, and African and Middle Eastern Policy (2018–2020).

== Life ==
He is an expert in the areas of Central Asia, the Middle East, including Iran, and petroleum issues in the region. He is fluent in English, Turkish, Persian, French, Italian, and Russian.

Graduate of the Bolesław Chrobry Secondary School in Piotrków Trybunalski. In 1993 he graduated from the Faculty of Journalism and Political Science at the University of Warsaw. In 2016, he obtained a Ph.D. degree in the Faculty of Oriental Studies of the University of Warsaw, presenting the thesis “The concept of state and nation in the writings of Deobandi ulema”.

In the years 1993–1997 he worked in the Department of Migration and Refugees of the Ministry of Interior and Administration. In 1997 he joined the Ministry of Foreign Affairs. In the years 1997–2003, he was the counselor of the Embassy of the Republic of Poland in Almaty. After returning to Poland, he was a minister's advisor in the Department of Eastern Policy of the Ministry of Foreign Affairs. From March 2006 to January 2007, he Served at the Polish Embassy in Greece as chargé d’affaires. In 2007–2009 he was the first ambassador of the Republic of Poland in Ashgabat after the establishment of the branch, and from August 2009 to June 2012 he managed the Polish diplomatic mission in Kabul. From April 2014 to July 2015, he was the head of the regional team of observers of the OSCE in w Ukraine. In August 2015, he was appointed an extraordinary and plenipotentiary Ambassador of the Republic of Poland in Kazakhstan, and in November that year also accredited as Ambassador to Kyrgyzstan. In October 2016, he was appointed the Polish ambassador to Turkey. On November 5, 2018, he became the Undersecretary of State in the Ministry of Foreign Affairs responsible for economic diplomacy, development cooperation, relations with Asian, African and Middle East countries. In July 2020, he was nominated ambassador to Romania, presenting his credentials the same month. He ended his term in Bucharest on February 5, 2023 and was nominated for the second term as the ambassador to Turkey.

He is the author of publications and analytical studies devoted to Central Asia and the Middle East (including ethnic and demographic problems, peace processes and conflicts, and energy issues). He cooperated, among others with the Centre for Eastern Studies. He is a co-author of publications from the scientific series "Contemporary Central Asia" prepared by the Institute of Political Sciences of the University of Warsaw.

== Honours ==
- Officer’s Cross of the Order of Polonia Restituta (2012)
- Commander's Cross of the Order of Polonia Restituta (2022)

== Works ==
He authored a number of publications and analyses, mainly on Central Asia and the Middle East:

- Tradition of Migration in the Muslim Culture, 1998
- Changes in the Ethnic Composition of Kazakhstan in the 20th Century, 2000
- Civil War and Peace Process in Tajikistan, 2002
- The Aegean Question in the Greek-Turkish relations, 2003
- Religion and Politics in Islam, 2003
- The Kyrgyz People under the Yoke of the Russian Empire, 2004
- Lang, Maciej (2021). W poszukiwaniu Nowej Medyny : muzułmańskie wizje niepodległych Indii u schyłku panowania brytyjskiego (in Polish). Towarzystwo Autorów i Wydawców Prac Naukowych "Universitas". Kraków: Towarzystwo Autorów i Wydawców Prac Naukowych "Universitas". ISBN 978-83-242-3742-5. OCLC 1262587094.

Translations

- Muhammad Husayn Tabatabai: Zarys nauk islamu. Maciej Lang (trans.). Warszawa: s.n., 1992, pp. 170. OCLC 749407492.
- Murtazā Muţahharī: Poznanie Koranu. Maciej Lang (trans.). Piotrków Trybunalski: Wydawnictwo Episteme, 1992, pp. 144. OCLC 749206242.
