= National Security Council (Sweden) =

Swedish government council

National Security Council of Sweden
- Nationella Säkerhetsrådet

Agency overview
- Formed: 10 November 2022
- Headquarters: Rosenbad
- Agency executives: Prime Minister Ulf Kristersson, Chairman; Niclas Kvarnström, National Security Advisor
- Parent agency: Prime Minister's Office

The National Security Council of Sweden (Swedish: Nationella säkerhetsrådet) is the body under the Swedish government in which matters of national security are discussed and security cooperation between different departments organized. A number of other countries also have similar councils, many of these serving as inspiration for the decision to establish the Swedish National Security Council.

== Composition ==
The National Security Council is chaired by the prime minister and consists of cabinet ministers. These are: The minister of justice, the minister of foreign affairs, the minister of defence, the minister of civil defence, and the minister of finance. Other leaders of political parties that are members of the government also become members of the council.

While those mentioned above are the only members of the council and are entitled to attend all meetings, the prime minister may invite others to attend individual meetings. These have so far included the leaders of all political parties in the Riksdag, the national police commissioner and the chief of defence.

As of July 2025, the National Security Council's membership is as follows:

Image	Member	Office(s)
	Ulf Kristersson (Chair)	Prime Minister
	Ebba Busch (Deputy Chair)	Deputy Prime Minister; Minister for Energy, Business, and Industry
	Elisabeth Svantesson	Minister for Finance
	Maria Malmer Stenergard	Minister for Foreign Affairs
	Gunnar Strömmer	Minister for Justice
	Pål Jonson	Minister for Defence
	Carl-Oskar Bohlin	Minister for Civil Defence
	Simona Mohamsson	Minister for Education and Integration

== History and function ==
The National Security Councils creation was first announced by Prime Minister Ulf Kristersson in his Declaration of Government held on 18 October 2022. The proposal to create one had however existed for many years and a Political Security Council had existed since the premiership of Stefan Löfven. On 10 November 2022 Henrik Landerholm was appointed as the first National Security Advisor to the Government and tasked with advicing the prime minister on how the council could be structured and operate.

The National Security Council ordinarily convenes every other week under the Prime Minister's chairmanship. It may however meet more often if required, such as in a state of emergency. The role of the council is to make it easier for cabinet ministers to inform each other and the prime minister on matters of national security and cooperate operations between their departments regarding national security.

== National Security Advisor ==
The National Security Advisor to the Government of Sweden (Swedish: Regeringens nationella säkerhetsrådgivare) is the official responsible for assisting and advicing the National Security Council and the prime minister, as well as managing the councils affairs. They shall also provide analysis and information to the council.

The Chief officer for crisis management under the Government Offices serves as Deputy National Security Advisor.

The National Security Advisor is appointed by the Prime Minister and serves at their pleasure. The position has a monthly salary of 110,000 SEK, the same as that of a director general of a government agency. The position is supposed to be outside of the spoils system.

=== List of National Security Advisors ===
No.	Portrait	Name	Took office	Left office	Time in office	Party	Prime Minister
1	Henrik Landerholm	Lieutenant Colonel; Henrik Landerholm (born 1963)	10 November 2022	27 January 2025	2 years, 78 days	Moderate	Ulf Kristersson (M)
-	Annika Brändström	Annika Brändström; Acting	27 January 2025	8 May 2025	101 days	Independent	Ulf Kristersson (M)
2	Tobias Thyberg	Tobias Thyberg (born 1975)	8 May 2025	9 May 2025	1 day	Independent	Ulf Kristersson (M)
-	Annika Brändström	Annika Brändström; Acting	9 May 2025	28 July 2025	80 days	Independent	Ulf Kristersson (M)
3	Niclas Kvarnström	Niclas Kvarnström (born 1975)	28 July 2025	Incumbent	1 year, 13 days	Independent	Ulf Kristersson (M)
