= Thyberg =

Thyberg is a surname. Notable people with the surname include:

- Ninja Thyberg (born 1984), Swedish filmmaker
- Tobias Thyberg (born 1975), Swedish diplomat
