= Strömmen =

Strömmen may refer to:

- Strømmen, a town in Norway.
- Stockholms ström, a part of the Saltsjön bay of the Baltic Sea, in Sweden.
