= Prime Minister's Office (Sweden) =

- Statsrådsberedningen

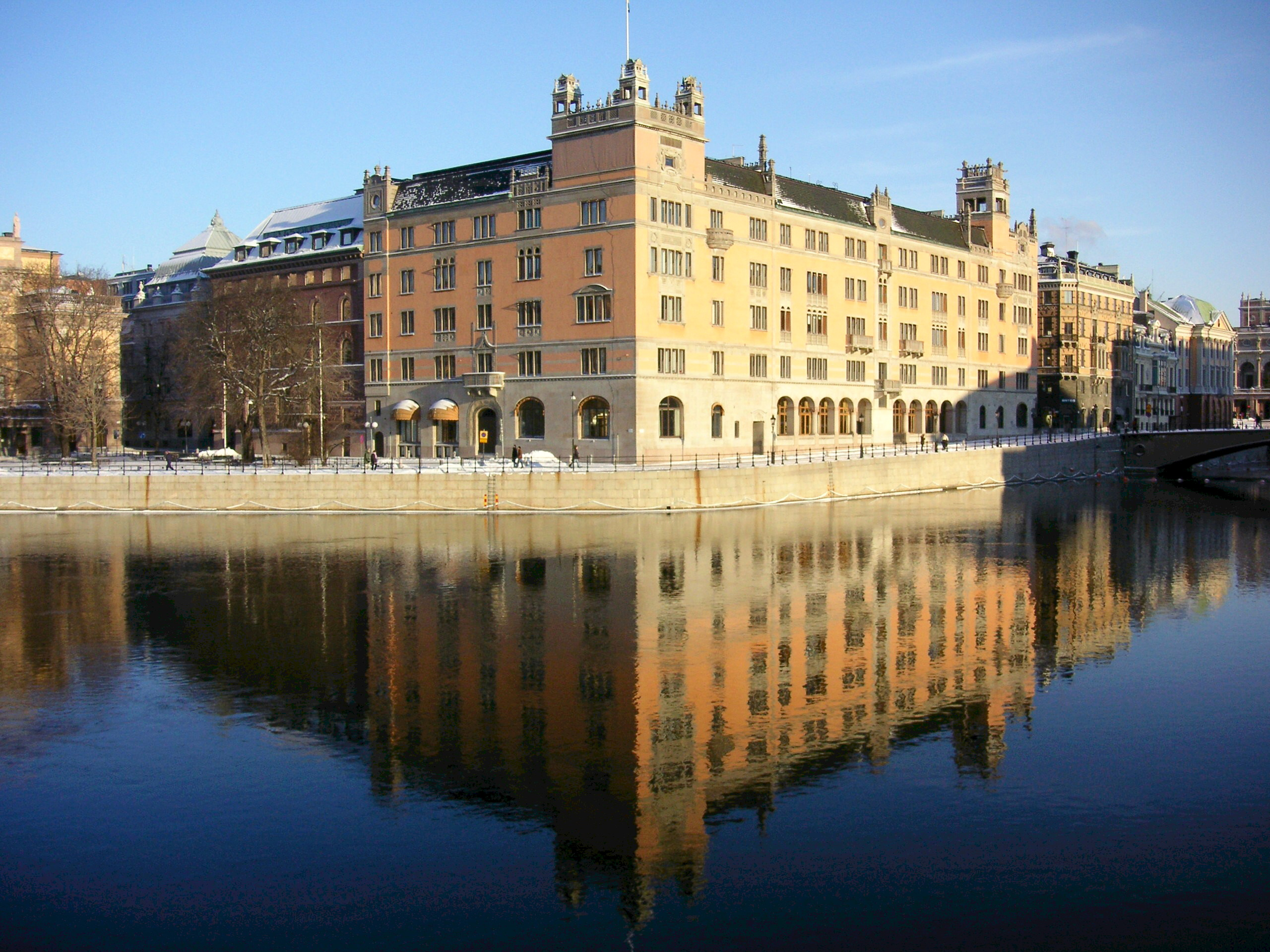
- Rosenbad, the seat of the Prime Minister's Office.

Agency overview
- Formed: 1960
- Headquarters: Stockholm, Sweden
- Employees: 238 (2024)
- Annual budget: N/A (Note: The Prime Minister's Office is part of the Government Offices of Sweden, which had a budget of SEK 9.512 billion in 2024.)
- Agency executive: Ulf Kristersson, Prime Minister of Sweden
- Key document: SFS 1996:1515
- Website: www.regeringen.se/sveriges-regering/statsradsberedningen/

The Prime Minister's Office (Note: Statsrådsberedningen is translated as the Prime Minister's Office. Previously, it was sometimes translated as Cabinet Office.) (Swedish: Statsrådsberedningen, SB) in Sweden is responsible for leading, coordinating, and supporting the work of the Government Offices. It assists the prime minister and the minister for EU affairs, ensuring that government policies, administration, and decision-making across ministries are aligned and effective. The office oversees political strategy, legal matters, crisis management, national security, EU affairs, and internal administration.

The office has evolved gradually since the late 19th century. Initially, the prime minister had no dedicated staff, and support functions were part of the Ministry of Justice. By the 1960s, the Prime Minister's Office became an independent unit, and in 1997 it became part of the unified Government Offices of Sweden, headed by the prime minister.

Organizationally, the office is led by the prime minister and supported by state secretaries and the permanent secretary. It includes specialized offices for administration, legal coordination, EU policy, strategic planning, crisis management, national security, intelligence coordination, and internal auditing. These units work together to ensure consistency, efficiency, and strategic oversight across all government operations, helping the prime minister manage both day-to-day administration and long-term government priorities.

== History ==
The Prime Minister's Office as an organizational unit within the Government Offices of Sweden is of relatively recent origin. The prime minister, whose office was established in 1876, initially did not have any proper administrative staff at his disposal. Such a function gradually developed as a preparatory body within the Ministry of Justice. It was not until the early 1950s that the foundation was laid for the staff that the Prime Minister now commands. At first, it was organized as two secretariats within the Ministry of Justice, one for the Prime Minister and one for ministers without portfolio (the reviewing consultants).

Only in the 1960 edition of the Sveriges statskalender was the Prime Minister's Office listed as an independent organizational unit within the Royal Chancery (now the Government Offices of Sweden). Through the 1965 Instructions for Government Departments (1965:386), the duties of the Prime Minister's Office were formally regulated. Section 2 states that "the task of the Prime Minister's Office is to assist the Prime Minister and ministers without portfolio." It was not until the late 1960s that the Prime Minister's Office acquired a more substantial administrative structure, including its own archival system (registry, etc., from 1 July 1969), although matters such as budget appropriations for the Prime Minister's Office were still handled within the Ministry of Justice.

With the 1974 Instrument of Government, the old Royal Chancery was replaced by the Government Offices of Sweden. Under the Basic Laws, the Prime Minister personally makes a number of decisions: he or she appoints heads of ministries, convenes Cabinet meetings, and may decide that a group of matters belonging to one ministry shall be presented by a minister other than the head of that ministry, among other responsibilities. Since 1 January 1997, the Government Offices of Sweden has been organized as a single government agency (SFS 1996:1515), consisting of the Prime Minister's Office, all ministries, and the central body common to the entire administration, the Government Offices' Office for Administrative Affairs (Regeringskansliets förvaltningsavdelning). The prime minister serves as the head of the Government Offices.

== Organisation ==
The head of the Prime Minister's Office is the prime minister. The Prime Minister's Office also includes the minister for EU affairs. The Prime Minister's Office is divided into offices. Directly below the ministers are the state secretaries. They assist the ministers with planning, coordination, and follow-up of activities.

=== Prime Minister's Office (PM's staff) ===
Within the Prime Minister's Office, there is a staff that manages the prime minister's engagements. The staff also works on the government's overall political strategy. There is also a press unit that handles media relations. The prime minister's state secretary supports the prime minister in his or her role as head of government and as head of the Government Offices. Furthermore, directly under the prime minister, this official is responsible for directing and allocating work within the Prime Minister's Office and leads the Group for Strategic Coordination (Gruppen för strategisk samordning, GSS) in matters concerning crisis management.

=== Coordination Office ===
The Coordination Office handle political coordination within the Government Offices of Sweden.

=== Office of the Minister for EU Affairs ===
Within the Office of the Minister for EU Affairs (EU-ministerns kansli), there is a staff that manages the minister's engagements. There is also a press secretary responsible for media relations. The state secretary to the minister for EU affairs has corresponding responsibilities in relation to the prime minister in EU matters and bilateral engagements in Europe.

=== Permanent Secretary and the Permanent Secretary's Office ===
The permanent secretary (förvaltningschefen) assists, together with the prime minister's state secretary and the director-general for legal affairs (rättschefen) in the Prime Minister's Office), the prime minister in the day-to-day management of the Government Offices. The permanent secretary is also the head of the Government Offices' Office for Administrative Affairs and is organizationally placed within the Prime Minister's Office. The permanent secretary is responsible for the overall planning of the Government Offices, as well as for budgeting and follow-up. The permanent secretary is also responsible for administrative matters that concern multiple ministries or multiple committees across different areas of responsibility. Under the prime minister's state secretary, the permanent secretary also has overarching responsibility for the administration of the Prime Minister's Office and submits proposals for, and follows up on, its budget.

The Permanent Secretary's Office (Förvaltningschefens kansli) assists the permanent secretary both in his or her capacity as permanent secretary of the Government Offices and as head of the Government Offices' Office for Administrative Affairs. The office is responsible for matters concerning the organization of the Government Offices, premises management, development and efficiency improvements, and the allocation process for the Government Offices' appropriations. Furthermore, the office supports the permanent secretary in matters concerning the administration of the Prime Minister's Office. Reporting to the permanent secretary is the HR Director, who is specifically tasked with promoting development and uniformity in employer policy issues across the Government Offices. The HR Director is also responsible for HR matters within the Prime Minister's Office.

=== Director-General for Legal Affairs and the Legal Affairs Office ===
The director-general for legal affairs (rättschefen) in the Prime Minister's Office assists, together with the prime minister's state secretary and the permanent secretary (förvaltningschefen), the prime minister in the day-to-day management of the Government Offices. The director-general for legal affairs also assists the prime minister in legal matters. The director-general for legal affairs in the Prime Minister's Office is responsible for coordination within the Government Offices in legal and linguistic matters, with the aim of ensuring consistency and high quality in legislation and public administration. The director-general for legal affairs oversees legality, coherence, and uniformity in the preparation of matters within the Prime Minister's Office.

The Legal Affairs Office (Rättschefens kansli) assists the director-general for legal affairs and serves as the legal secretariat of the Prime Minister's Office. Its task is to support the coordination of the Government Offices for which the Prime Minister's Office is responsible. Furthermore, the office supports the Prime Minister and the rest of the political leadership in the Prime Minister's Office in legal matters and has particular responsibility for government business. The office also participates in efforts to develop the Government Offices as a public authority. The Legal Affairs Office also includes the office responsible for the official record of government decisions.

=== Office for the Development of Core Processes ===
Reporting to the director-general for legal affairs is the Office for the Development of Core Processes (Kansliet för utveckling av kärnprocesserna). This office leads cross-government work on developing the working methods of core operations, supported by digital tools.

=== Review Office ===
Under the director-general for legal affairs is the Review Office (Granskningskansliet). It operates within the Government Offices to promote consistency and high quality in legislation, with particular responsibility for ensuring that language is clear, simple, and comprehensible. The office carries out legal and linguistic quality control of legislation from all ministries, provides advisory services, and participates in training and other development work. In addition, the office is responsible for EU language review. Furthermore, the office is responsible for the electronic promulgation of statutes in the Swedish Code of Statutes (SFS) and for the Government Offices' legal databases, as well as for the Government Offices' contacts with the Council on Legislation.

=== Head of EU Affairs and EU Coordination ===
The head of EU affairs assists the prime minister in EU matters. Under the head of EU affairs is the EU coordination (EU-samordningen) function, which works to ensure the effective implementation of Sweden's EU policy. It coordinates EU work within the Government Offices and is responsible for the EU treaties and the long-term budget. The coordination function is also responsible for the government's conduct in cases before the Court of Justice of the European Union, coordinates Sweden's implementation of EU law, and carries out certain legal reviews related to EU law. The coordination function is to promote the employment of Swedish nationals in the institutions of the European Union and has administrative responsibility for the Swedish Institute for European Policy Studies (Sieps). EU coordination includes the Office for the General Affairs Council and COREPER I, the Office for the European Council and COREPER II, and the Office for EU Legal and Institutional Affairs.

=== National Security Adviser ===
Within the Prime Minister's Office, there is a national security advisor responsible for the analysis, coordination, and strategic direction of matters concerning national security. The adviser assists the National Security Council. The adviser also assists the prime minister in foreign and security policy matters, as well as in matters concerning national security.

=== Senior Official for Crisis Management and the Crisis Management Office ===
Under the national security adviser, the senior official for crisis management is responsible for analysis, coordination, and strategic direction of crisis management within the Government Offices, as well as for its development, follow-up, and necessary preparations. Reporting to the senior official for crisis management is the Crisis Management Office.

=== Office for Foreign and Security Policy Affairs ===
Under the national security advisor, there is an Office for Foreign and Security Policy Affairs (Kansliet för utrikes och säkerhetspolitiska frågor). The office supports the national security adviser in assisting the prime minister with ongoing foreign and security policy matters.

=== Office for Strategic Analysis and Coordination of National Security Issues ===
Under the national security adviser, there is an Office for Strategic Analysis and Coordination of National Security Issues (Kansliet för strategisk analys och samordning av frågor om nationell säkerhet). The office analyses and coordinates matters relating to national security and supports the ministries in their work on such issues.

=== Office for Intelligence Coordination ===
Under the national security adviser, there is an Office for Intelligence Coordination (Kansliet för samordning av underrättelser). The office analyses and coordinates intelligence within the Government Offices.

=== Internal Audit ===
The internal audit function is responsible for conducting internal audits of all activities within the Government Offices, including committees and the diplomatic service. The audits include, among other things, independent reviews of internal governance and control within the Government Offices, as well as how the Government Offices fulfill their financial reporting obligations.

== Location ==
In the mid-1960s, planning began for an expansion of the Government Offices in the southern Klara district. The Parliament had vacated its building on Helgeandsholmen for several years, and in 1975, it decided to move back to its "own building." This prompted the acceleration of plans for the ministry expansion, as Parliament needed to use the chancery building (Kanslihuset) at Mynttorget 2. In 1981, the Prime Minister's Office and the Ministry of Justice moved out of the chancery and into Rosenbad. Prior to this, several ministries had already relocated from Gamla stan to other premises. After 1981, the remaining ministries in Gamla stan moved across Stockholms ström to southern Klara. The Ministry of Education was the last to relocate, in 1993. In 2008, parts of the Government Offices moved into the former Central Post Office Building on Mäster Samuelsgatan/Vasagatan. After all these relocations, the entire Government Offices is now situated north of Stockholms ström—gathered together but still spread across different buildings. Most ministries, the Prime Minister's Office, and the Government Offices' Office for Administrative Affairs (Regeringskansliets förvaltningsavdelning) are connected through an underground tunnel system.

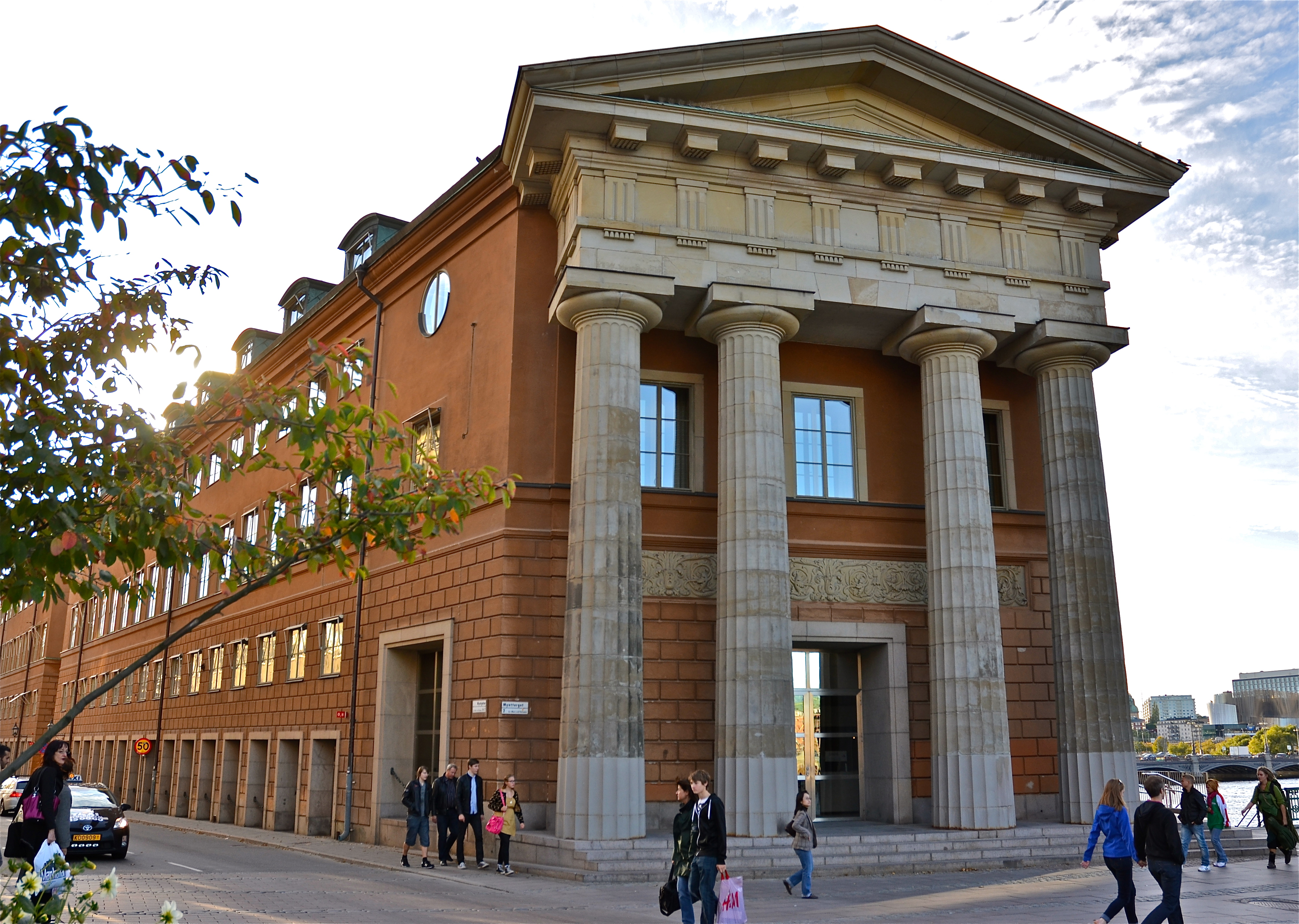
Mynttorget 2
(–1981)

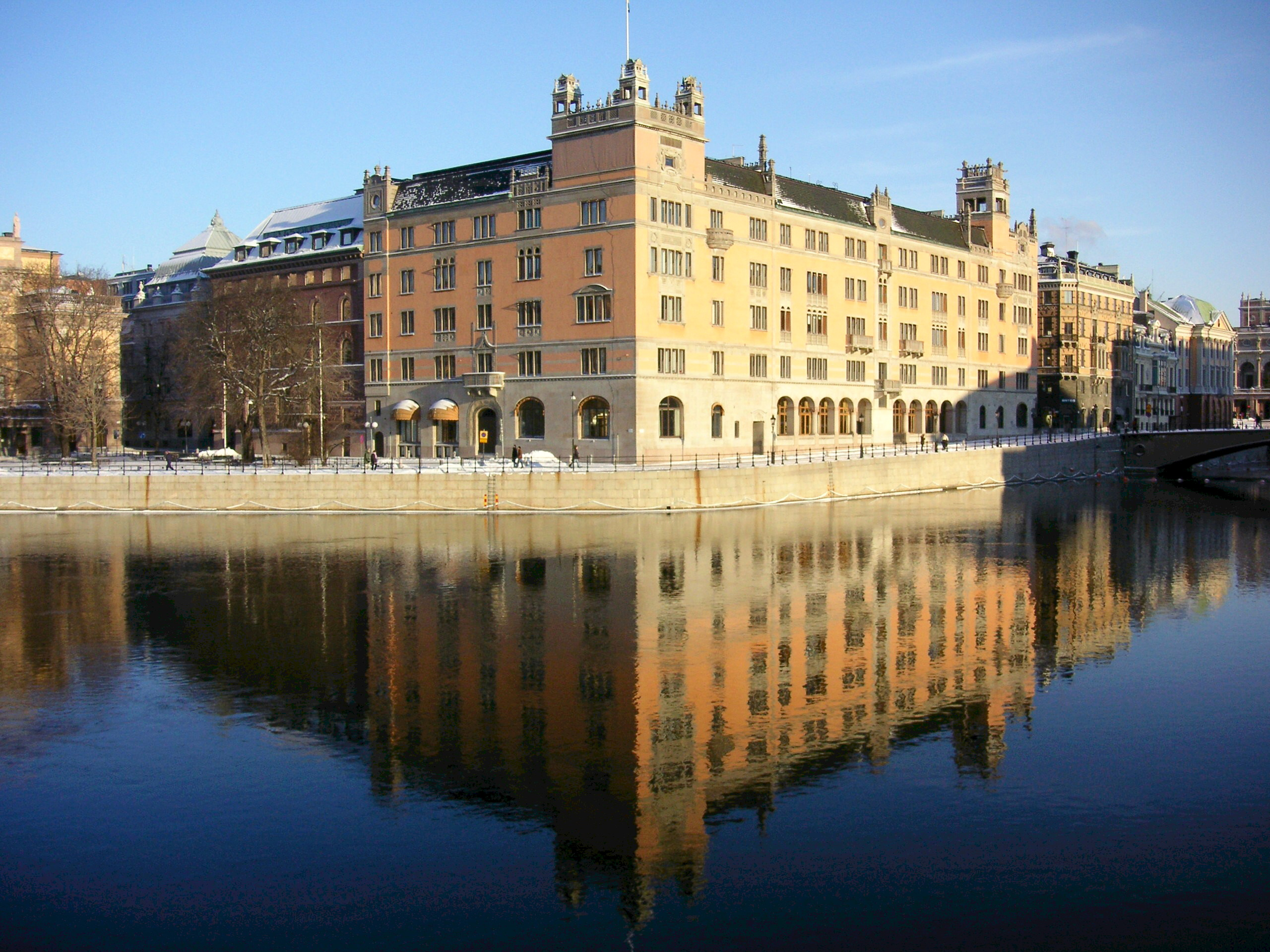
Rosenbad 4
(1981–present)
