= Maciej Górski =

Maciej Górski may refer to:

- Maciej Górski (politician) (1944–2020), Polish diarist and politician
- Maciej Górski (footballer) (born 1990), Polish footballer
