= Stefan Gullgren =

Swedish diplomat (born 1968)

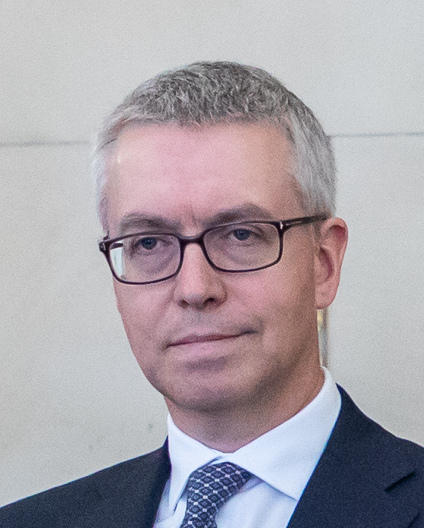
- Stefan in 2023

Ambassador of Sweden to the United Kingdom
- Incumbent
- Assumed office August 2023
- Preceded by: Mikaela Kumlin Granit

Ambassador of Sweden to Poland
- In office 1 September 2017 – August 2023
- Preceded by: Inga Eriksson Fogh
- Succeeded by: Andreas von Beckerath

Ambassador of Sweden to Ukraine
- In office 2009–2013
- Preceded by: John-Christer Åhlander
- Succeeded by: Andreas von Beckerath

Personal details
- Born: 8 November 1968 (age 57) Jönköping, Sweden
- Citizenship: Sweden
- Spouse: Alla Logova (m. 1997)
- Occupation: Politician

Stefan Gullgren (born 8 November 1968) is a Swedish politician and diplomat who currently serves as the Ambassador of Sweden to the United Kingdom since August 2023. He previously served as the Ambassador of Sweden to Ukraine from 2009 to 2013 and the Ambassador of Sweden to Poland from 2017 to 2021.

== Early life and education ==
Stefan Gullgren was born on 8 November 1968 in Jönköping, Sweden. He got a Degree of Master of Laws at Uppsala University in 1994. In 1997, he married Alla Logova.

== Career ==
Gullgren previously served as the Ambassador of Sweden to Ukraine from 2009 to 2013. After that, he became the head of Ministry of Foreign Affairs' unit for Eastern Europe and Central Asia from 2013 to September 2017.

Gullgren then became the Ambassador to Poland in September 2017. In 2018, he met with the head of the National Security Bureau Paweł Soloch, and discussed on security within the Baltic Sea region. In 2019, he gave a lecture for students at the College of Europe.

In June 2023, it was confirmed that Gullgren would be the Swedish Ambassador of the United Kingdom. He was appointed in August 2023.

=== Visits ===
In January 2025, Tuot Panha, Ambassador of Cambodia to the United Kingdom, visited Gullgren to his residence where they discussed strengthening bilateral relations and cooperation between the two countries.

Diplomatic posts
Preceded by John-Christer Åhlander	Ambassador of Sweden to Ukraine; 2009–2013	Succeeded by Andreas von Beckerath
Preceded by Inga Eriksson Fogh	Ambassador of Sweden to Poland; 2017–2023	Succeeded by Andreas von Beckerath
Preceded by Mikaela Kumlin Granit	Ambassador of Sweden to the United Kingdom; 2013–present	Succeeded by Incumbent
