= List of ambassadors of Poland to Greece =

Poland Ambassador to Greece
- Ambasador Rzeczypospolitej Polskiej w Grecji
- Coat of arms of Poland
- Style: Mr. Ambassador (informal); His Excellency (diplomatic)
- Reports to: Polish Ministry of Foreign Affairs
- Seat: Athens, Greece
- Appointer: President of Poland
- Term length: No fixed term
- Website: Embassy of Poland, Greece

The Republic of Poland's Ambassador to Greece is the official representative of the President and Government of Poland to the President and Government of Greece. The ambassador is also the head of the Poland's diplomatic mission in Greece.

Diplomatic relations between Poland and Greece were established on 13 March 1919.

The Embassy of Poland in Greece is located in Athens, and Honorary Consulates are located in Thessaloniki, Piraeus, Heraklion and Rhodes.

== List of ambassadors of Poland to Greece ==
- 1919–1921 – August Zaleski (envoy)
- 1921–1924 – Mikołaj Jurystowski (envoy)
- 1924–1926 – Czesław Andrycz (chargé d’affaires)
- 1926–1934 – Paweł Juriewicz (envoy)
- 1934–1936 – Zygmunt Wierski (chargé d’affaires)
- 1936–1942 – Władysław Günther-Schwarzburg (envoy)
- 1942–1943 – Roger Adam Raczyński (envoy)
- 1943–1945 – Paweł Czerwiński (chargé d’affaires)
- 1945 – Roger Adam Raczyński (envoy)
- 1956–1960 – Aleksander Małecki (envoy)
- 1960–1966 – Zygmunt Dworakowski
- 1966–1970 – Henryk Golański
- 1972–1975 – Stanisław Dobrowolski
- 1975–1979 – Jan Bisztyga
- 1979–1984 – Janusz Lewandowski
- 1984–1989 – Józef Tejchma
- 1989–1992 – Janusz Lewandowski
- 1992–1997 – Ryszard Żółtaniecki
- 1997–2001 – Wojciech Lamentowicz
- 2001–2005 – Grzegorz Dziemidowicz
- 2005–2006 – Maciej Górski
- 2006–2007 – Maciej Lang (chargé d’affaires)
- 2007–2012 – Michał Klinger
- 2012–2014 – Maciej Krych
- 2015–2019 – Anna Barbarzak
- 2020–2024 – Artur Lompart
- since 2024 – Wojciech Ponikiewski (chargé d’affaires)
