= List of ambassadors of Poland to Romania =

Poland Ambassador to Romania
- Ambasador Rzeczypospolitej Polskiej w Rumunii
- Coat of arms of Poland
- Incumbent; Vacant since 30 October 2026
- Style: Mr. Ambassador (informal); His Excellency (diplomatic)
- Reports to: Polish Ministry of Foreign Affairs
- Seat: Bucharest, Romania
- Appointer: President of Poland
- Term length: No fixed term
- Website: Embassy of Poland, Romania

The Polish ambassador to Romania is the official representative of the president and the government of Poland to the president and the government of Romania.

The ambassador and his staff work in the Polish embassy in Bucharest. Moreover, there are honorary consulates located in Brașov, Cluj-Napoca and Timișoara.

== History ==
Poland have established diplomatic relations with Romania on June 22, 1919. Due to the World War II, in 1940, diplomatic relations between the two countries broke off. In 1945 new communist governments of Poland and Romania officially restored diplomatic relations.

== List of ambassadors of Poland to Romania ==
=== Second Polish Republic ===
- 1918-1919: Marian Linde (chargé d’affaires a.i.)
- 1919-1922: Aleksander Skrzyński (envoy)
- 1922-1923: Paweł Juriewicz (chargé d’affaires a.i.)
- 1923: Paweł Juriewicz (envoy)
- 1923-1926: Józef Wielowieyski
- 1927-1932: Jan Szembek
- 1932-1938: Mirosław Arciszewski
- 1938-1940: Roger Adam Raczyński

November 4, 1940 – closure of the diplomatic mission at the request of the Germany to the government of the Kingdom of Romania.

=== Polish People's Republic ===
- 1946-1947: Stefan Wengierow (chargé d’affaires)
- 1947-1951: Piotr Szymański
- 1951-1955: Wojciech Wrzosek
- 1955-1957: Jan Izydorczyk
- 1957-1963: Janusz Zambrowicz
- 1963-1968: Wiesław Sobierajski
- 1968-1973: Jaromir Ochęduszko
- 1973-1979: Władysław Wojtasik
- 1979-1981: Jerzy Kusiak
- 1981-1988: Bolesław Koperski
- 1988-1990: Jerzy Woźniak

=== Third Polish Republic ===
- 1990-1992: Zygmunt Komorowski
- 1993-1999: Bogumił Luft
- 1999-2003: Michał Klinger
- 2003-2008: Krystyn Jacek Paliszewski
- 2008-2010: Wojciech Zajączkowski
- 2011-2015: Marek Szczygieł
- 2015-2019: Marcin Wilczek
- 2020-2023: Maciej Lang
- since 2023: Paweł Soloch
