= Sobieski Institute =

Polish think tank

Instytut Sobieskiego (the Sobieski Institute) is a think tank founded in Poland in 2004, known for its political advocacy of the Polish conservative political movement. Poland's social conservative party Law and Justice, which governed Poland from 2005 to 2007 and from 2015 to 2023, was inspired by many ideas and projects proposed by the Sobieski Institute.

It is committed to a conservative, liberal state, with strong focus on free market and new technologies, Polish strong presence within the European Union and is an advocate of economic freedom.

The main areas of interest of its experts and analysts are security and defense policy, energy policy, international relations, law, public finance and information and communication technologies.

It publishes reports and comment on economy, law proposals and innovation strategies of Poland and European Union. Used to publish journal Międzynarodowy Przęgląd Polityczny (The International Political Review), which reports on the latest developments in political thought from major neoconservative political centres in Europe and United States.

Former presidents of the Sobieski Institute play important role in Polish public life. Marek Dietl was the CEO of Warsaw Stock Exchange, Paweł Soloch is the ambassador to Romania and was the chief of the National Security Office and Paweł Szałamacha is the board member of the National Bank of Poland (Narodowy Bank Polski).

Instytut Sobieskiego is a member of the Stockholm Network.
