= Anna Barbarzak =

Polish diplomat

Poland Ambassador to Greece
- In office 21 January 2016 – 15 August 2019
- Appointed by: Andrzej Duda
- President: Prokopis Pavlopoulos
- Preceded by: Maciej Krych
- Succeeded by: Artur Lompart

Personal details
- Spouse: Wojciech Flera
- Education: Warsaw School of Economics
- Profession: Diplomat

Anna Barbarzak is a Polish civil servant and diplomat who served as an ambassador to Greece from 2016 to 2019.

== Education ==
Barbarzak studied international economic relations at the SGH Warsaw School of Economics. She was studying also international security at the Geneva Centre for Security Policy.

== Career ==
In 2001, she began her career at the Ministry of Foreign Affairs. Between 2006 and 2007 she was working as a Third Secretary at the Permanent Mission of the Republic of Poland to the United Nations Office in Geneva. From 2007 to 2011 she was Second and First Secretary at the Embassy in Washington, being responsible for economic, climate and energy issues. Afterwards, she was heading the unit at the Minister's secretary. In 2013, she became deputy director, and later director of the Department of Economic Cooperation, being in charge of, among other, coordinating cooperation with OECD, IMF, UNCTAD, EBRD, EIB.

In October 2015, Barbarzak was nominated as Poland's ambassador to Greece. She presented her letter of credence on 21 January 2016. During her time as ambassador she increased cooperation between the Polish and Greek shipbuilding industries. She also attempted to expand the tourism cooperation between the two countries by pushing new promotional initiatives. She ended her term in 2019.

From 2023 to 2024, Barbarzak was Minister-Counsellor for the World Intellectual Property Organization at the Polish mission to the UN. Since 2024 she has been Minister Plenipotentiary for the World Intellectual Property Organization, CERN, and the International Telecommunication Union.

== Personal life ==
Besides Polish, Barbarzak speaks English and Russian languages. She is married to Wojciech Flera.
