= Marcin Wilczek =

Polish politician (born 1967)

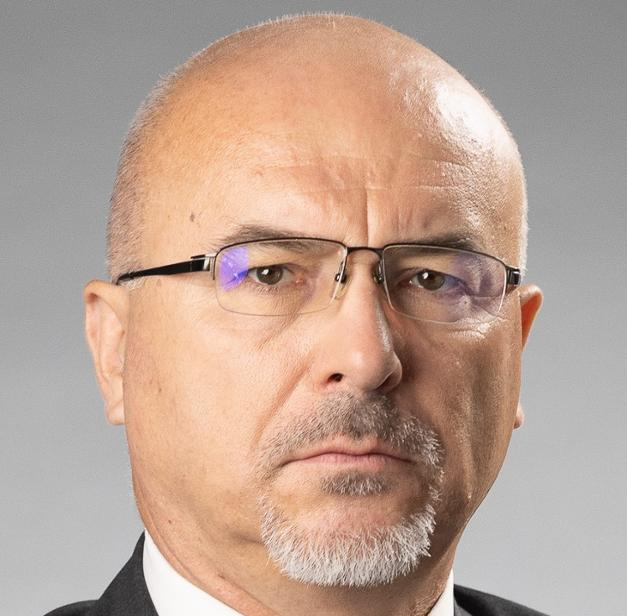
- Marcin Wilczek (2024)

Poland Ambassador to Romania
- In office 2015–2019
- Appointed by: Bronisław Komorowski
- President: Klaus Iohannis
- Preceded by: Marek Szczygieł
- Succeeded by: Maciej Lang

Poland Ambassador to Turkey
- In office 2008–2012
- Appointed by: Lech Kaczyński
- President: Abdullah Gül
- Preceded by: Grzegorz Michalski
- Succeeded by: Mieczysław Cieniuch

Poland Consul General to Istanbul
- In office 2005–2008
- Preceded by: Maciej Krych
- Succeeded by: Mirosław Stawski

Personal details
- Born: 25 April 1967 (age 59) Warsaw, Poland
- Children: two
- Education: University of Warsaw
- Profession: Diplomat

Marcin Bartłomiej Wilczek (born 25 April 1967 in Warsaw) is a Polish diplomat, Poland Ambassador to Turkey (2008–2012) and to Romania (2015–2019).

== Education and career ==
Marcin Wilczek graduated from the University of Warsaw Institute of Applied Linguistics (M.A., 1991) and the National School of Public Administration (1994).

He started his career in 1991 at Lot Polish Airlines. In 1994, he joined the Ministry of Foreign Affairs, beginning as a desk officer responsible for Albania and Turkey. Between 1997 and 2002, he worked at the embassy in London. From 2002 to 2005, he was the head of MFA Northern Europe section. In 2005, he became the Consul-General in Istanbul. From 2008 to 2012 he served as an ambassador to Turkey. After his return to Warsaw, between 2012 and 2015, he was the Head of Minister's Secretariat at the MFA. On 29 July 2015, he was nominated to be Poland Ambassador to Romania. He presented his credentials to president Klaus Iohannis on 10 September 2015. Wilczek ended his term on 31 August 2019. Shortly after he became Deputy Director of the European Policy Department. From 2020 to 2024, he worked at the MFA EU External Policy Department. In October 2024, Wilczek became chargé d'affaires of Poland to Iran.

== Languages spoken ==
Besides Polish, he speaks English, French, and Turkish languages.

== Personal life ==
He is married, with two children.[2]

== Honours ==
- Order of Honour (Greece)
- Commander of the National Order of Faithful Service (Romania, 2019)
