= Rosenbad =

Building used for the Swedish Government Offices, Stockholm, Sweden

Coordinates: 59°19′42″N 18°03′56″E

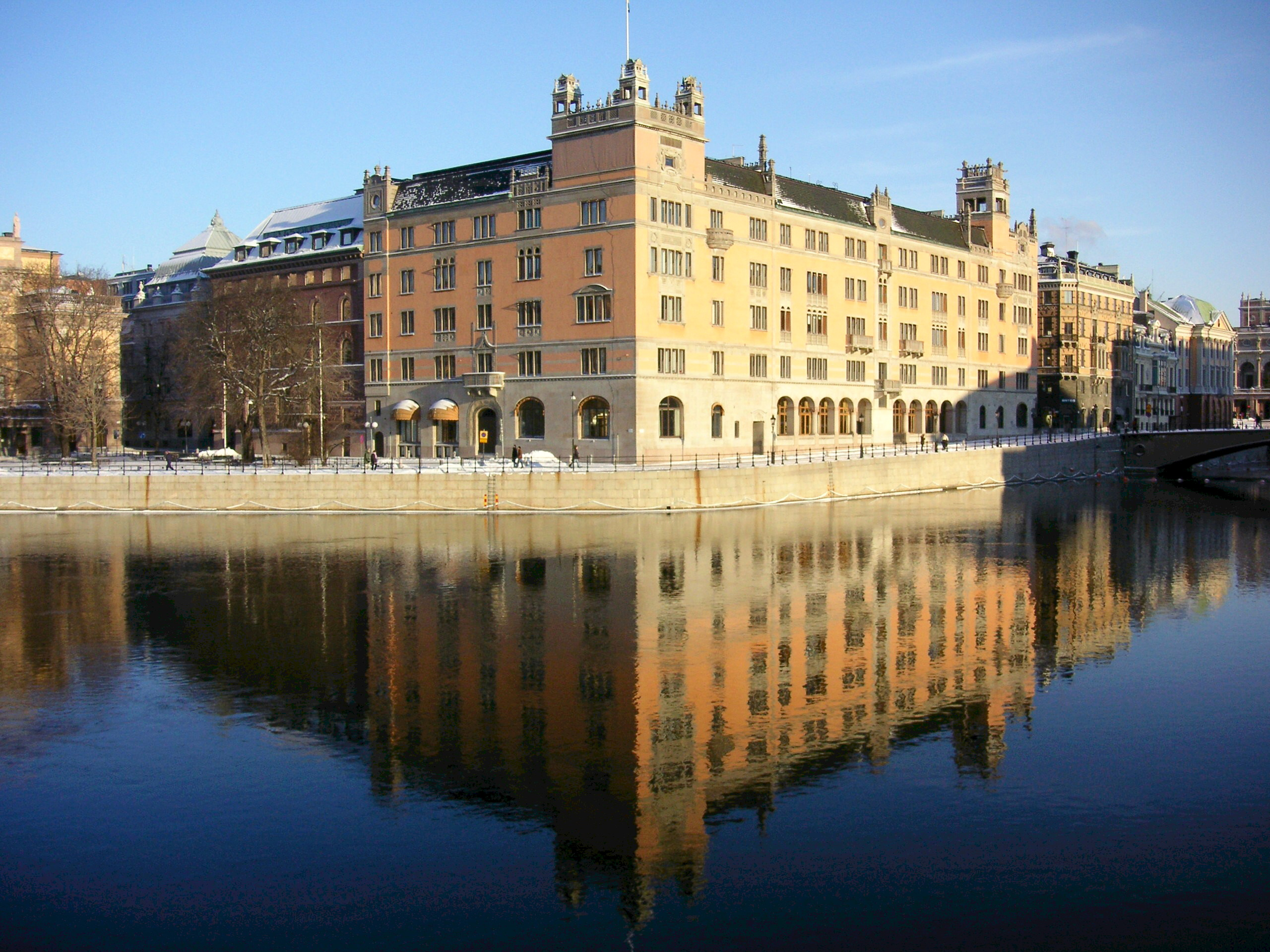
- Rosenbad
- Interactive map of the Rosenbad area

General information
- Location: Stockholm, Sweden
- Construction started: 1900
- Completed: 1902

Design and construction
- Architect: Ferdinand Boberg

Rosenbad (Swedish: [ˈrûːsɛnˌbɑːd], lit. 'Rosen bath') is a building in central Stockholm, precinct of Norrmalm. It is a building owned by the Swedish state and serves as the seat of the Government. The present government of Sweden is the right-leaning Kristersson Cabinet.

Rosenbad is located on Strömgatan on the north side of the river Norrström. It was designed by Art Nouveau architect Ferdinand Boberg, and completed in 1902. It originally housed a variety of functions, including a restaurant (until 1956) of the same name. Renovation of the entire block began in autumn 2018, and is expected to be completed in spring 2023. In the meantime, the Government Offices are housed in surrounding blocks.

== Government building ==
Rosenbad now functions as the seat for the Prime Minister's Office and the Government Offices. It is located close to the Sager House, the official residence of the Prime Minister. The Parliament House and the Royal Palace are located across the waters of Stockholms ström.

== See also ==
- Architecture of Stockholm
- Government of Sweden
- Politics of Sweden
