= List of ambassadors of Sweden to Poland =

Ambassador of Sweden to Poland
- Lesser coat of arms of the Kingdom of Sweden
- Incumbent; Martina Quick since September 2025
- Ministry for Foreign Affairs; Swedish Embassy, Warsaw
- Style: His or Her Excellency (formal); Mr. or Madam Ambassador (informal)
- Reports to: Minister for Foreign Affairs
- Residence: Bagatela 3, Ujazdów (Note: The ambassador's residence is at the same location as the chancery.)
- Seat: Warsaw, Poland
- Appointer: Government of Sweden
- Term length: No fixed term
- Inaugural holder: Gustaf Zülich
- Formation: 1729
- Website: Swedish Embassy, Warsaw

The Ambassador of Sweden to Poland (known formally as the Ambassador of the Kingdom of Sweden to the Republic of Poland) is the official representative of the government of Sweden to the president of Poland and government of Poland.

== History ==
Sweden established diplomatic relations with Poland on 3 June 1919. Ivan Danielsson arrived in Warsaw in 1919 as Sweden's chargé d'affaires, while Cossva Anckarsvärd did not arrive until June 1920 as envoy. On 5 June 1919, the King in Council decided to recognize Poland as an independent and sovereign state.

In September 1956, an agreement was reached between the Swedish and Polish governments on the mutual elevation of the respective countries' legations to embassies. The diplomatic rank was thereafter changed to ambassador instead of envoy extraordinary and minister plenipotentiary.

== List of representatives ==
Name	Period	Title	Resident / Concurrent accreditation	Notes	Presented credentials	Ref
Crown of the Kingdom of Poland (1385–1795)
Gustaf Zülich	1729–1732	Minister				
Carl Rudenschöld	18 December 1732 – 1733	Chargé d'affaires				
Carl Rudenschöld	23 April 1733 – 19 July 1734	Minister plenipotentiary				
Paul Gammal Ehrenkrona	30 October 1738 – November 1741	Minister		At the Polish and Saxon courts in Dresden		
Gustaf Wulfvenstierna	1744–1745	Chargé d'affaires		Accompanied the King of Poland to Grodno in the capacity of chargé d'affaires		
Gustaf Wulfvenstierna	March 1745 – 1747	Minister				
Johan August Greiffenheim	1747–1749	Minister		At the Polish and Electoral Saxon court		
Carl Otto von Höpken	1749–1754	Minister		Poland and Saxony		
Carl Otto von Höpken	1754–1765	Envoy extraordinary				
Henrik Jakob von Düben	August 1767 – 1772	Envoy				
Lars von Engeström	11 November 1787 – 1788	Chargé d'affaires				
Lars von Engeström	17 August 1788 – 1790	Resident minister				
Lars von Engeström	28 May 1790 – 1792	Envoy				
Nils Bark	1792–1792	Envoy		Never took office		
Johan Christoffer Toll	30 September 1792 – 3 June 1794	Minister plenipotentiary		To the Polish court		
–	1794–1919	–		No representation between the Third Partition of Poland in 1795 and the creation of the Second Republic in 1918.		
Second Polish Republic (1918–1939)
Ivan Danielsson	1919–1920	Chargé d'affaires				
Cossva Anckarsvärd	20 February 1920 – 1931	Envoy			2 June 1920	
Einar Hennings	1931–1933	Envoy	Dual accreditation to Bucharest in 1933		2 December 1931	
Erik Boheman	1934–1937	Envoy	Dual accreditation to Bucharest from 1934 to 1935			
Joen Lagerberg	26 November 1937 – 1939 (Note: He left Poland and arrived in Cernăuți, Romania, near the Polish border, on 16 September 1939. On 18 September, he had arrived in Bucharest. From Bucharest, he traveled by train via Berlin to Stockholm, where he arrived on 27 September.)	Envoy				
–	1939–1945	–		No representation due to World War II		
Provisional Government of National Unity (1945–1947)
Brynolf Eng	1945–1945	Chargé d'affaires		Swedish government's delegate at the Provisional Government of National Unity		
Claes Westring	1945–1947	Envoy				
Republic of Poland (1947–1952) and Polish People's Republic (1952–1989)
Claes Westring	1947–1949	Envoy				
Gösta Engzell	1949–1951	Envoy				
Eric von Post	1951–1956	Envoy				
Gunnar Reuterskiöld	July 1956 – September 1956	Envoy			7 July 1956	
Gunnar Reuterskiöld	September 1956 – 1959	Ambassador			2 October 1956	
Ragnvald Bagge	1959–1962	Ambassador				
Erik Kronvall	1963–1969	Ambassador				
Claës Ivar Wollin	1969–1976	Ambassador				
Carl Johan Rappe	1976–1979	Ambassador				
Knut Thyberg	1979–1984	Ambassador				
Örjan Berner	1984–1987	Ambassador				
Jean-Christophe Öberg	1987–1989	Ambassador				
Republic of Poland (1989–present)
Jean-Christophe Öberg	1989–1991	Ambassador				
Karl-Vilhelm Wöhler	1991–1996	Ambassador				
Stefan Noreén	1996–2000	Ambassador				
Mats Staffansson	2000–2005	Ambassador				
Tomas Bertelman	2005–2008	Ambassador				
Dag Hartelius	2008–2010	Ambassador				
Staffan Herrström	2011–2015	Ambassador				
Inga Eriksson Fogh	2015–2017	Ambassador				
Stefan Gullgren	1 September 2017 – 2023	Ambassador				
Andreas von Beckerath	August 2023 – 2025	Ambassador				
Martina Quick	September 2025 – present	Ambassador				

== See also ==
- Poland–Sweden relations
