= Artur Lompart =

Polish diplomat

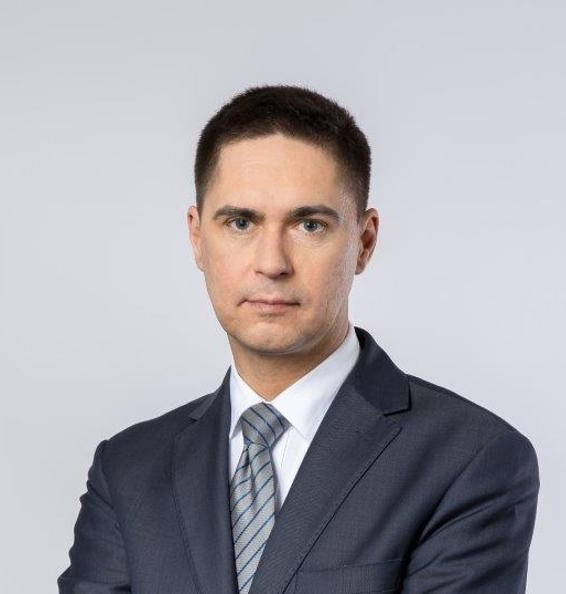

Poland Ambassador to Greece
- In office 20 July 2020 – July 2024
- Appointed by: Andrzej Duda
- President: Katerina Sakellaropoulou
- Preceded by: Anna Barbarzak
- Succeeded by: Wojciech Ponikiewski

Personal details
- Born: 30 July 1973 (age 53) Nowy Sącz
- Children: 2
- Education: University of Warsaw
- Profession: Diplomat, spokesperson

Artur Piotr Lompart (born 30 July 1973 in Nowy Sącz) is a Polish spokesperson, civil servant and diplomat, between 2020 and 2024 ambassador to Greece.

== Life ==
Lompart finished high school in Nowy Sącz. In 1997, he received master's degree at the University of Warsaw Institute of International Relations. Between 1994 and 1996, he was cooperating with Polish Television and Życie daily. In 1996, he started working for the University of Warsaw Bureau of Information and Promotion. In 1997, he became deputy spokesperson and, five years later, head of the Bureau and spokesperson.

In 2007, he started his diplomatic career, serving as culture and science counsellor at the embassy in New Delhi. Later, he was also responsible for development cooperation and consular affairs.

In 2014, he returned to the University of Warsaw, being in charge of coordination of the celebration of its 200th anniversary. In December 2015, he was employed by the Ministry of Foreign Affairs, Bureau for Organizing NATO 2016 Warsaw summit. In September 2016, he joined the MFA Consular Department, since February 2017 as head of its unit for America, Africa, Asia and Australia. On 6 October 2017, he took post of the director of the MFA Press Office and spokesperson of the Ministry. Since 22 October 2018, he was director of the MFA Bureau of Human Resources. Following his nomination as ambassador to Greece in May 2020, he took the post on 20 July 2020. He returned to Warsaw in July 2024.

Married, with two children.

== Honours ==
- Gold Cross of Merit, Poland (2019)
