= Labor Code of Ukraine =

- Original title: Кодекс законів про працю України
- Ratified: 10 December 1971
- Date effective: 17 December 1971

Official website
- zakon.rada.gov.ua/laws/show/322-08

The Labor Code of Ukraine (Ukrainian: Кодекс законів про працю України, romanized: Kodeks zakoniv pro pratsyu Ukrayiny) is the national code of laws about labor. The code was adopted and ratified by the Supreme Soviet of the Ukrainian SSR on 10 December, 1971.

== Overview ==
The Labor Code of Ukraine was adopted in the Soviet period. After the declaration of Ukraine's independence it was not adopted in a new version, only some articles of the code were added and updated, which makes it generally considered an outdated legal act.

The right to work in Ukraine is guaranteed by Article 43 of the Constitution of Ukraine and the Labor Code develops the provisions of this provision of the Basic Law. The right to work is the right of Ukrainian citizens, ensured by the state, to obtain employment with remuneration not lower than the minimum wage established by the state, and to freely choose a profession, occupation and work.

To replace the Labor Code adopted back in 1971, the government of Ukraine introduced draft law No. 2708 "On Labor," which was registered in the Verkhovna Rada on December 28, 2019, a couple of days before the deadline set by the president. By January 1, 2020, the Cabinet of Ministers was supposed to create conditions for "liberalization of labor relations and updating labor legislation." The document already has alternative versions, introduced by deputies of the Opposition Platform — For Life and Batkivshchyna.

== Structure ==
The Labor Code of Ukraine is divided into 18 chapters:

1. General Principles
2. Collective Agreement
3. Labor Agreement
  1. Providing employment to laid-off workers
4. Working Hours
5. Resting Hours
6. Normalization of Labor
7. Payment for Work
8. Guarantees and Compensations
9. Warranties for laying onto employees a liability for damage caused to enterprises, institutions, organizations
10. Job discipline
11. Job security
12. Female Labor
13. Youth Labor
14. Employee benefits that combine work with study
15. Individual Labor Disputes
16. Trade unions. Employee participation in managing an enterprise, institution, organization
  1. Labor team
17. Compulsory state social insurance and pension provision
18. Supervision and control over the observance of labor legislation
