= Paweł Soloch =

Polish official

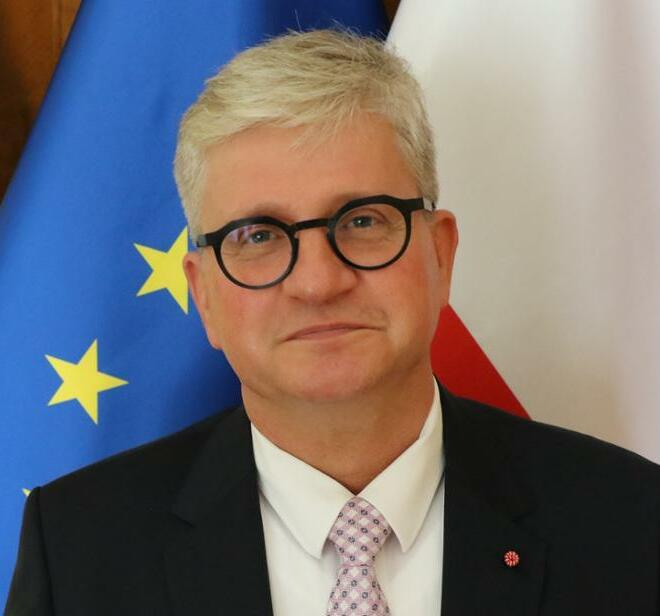
- Soloch in 2023

Poland Ambassador to Romania
- In office August 2023 – 30 October 2026
- Appointed by: Andrzej Duda
- President: Klaus Iohannis
- Preceded by: Maciej Lang

Head of the National Security Bureau
- In office August 2015 – October 2022
- Appointed by: Andrzej Duda
- Preceded by: Stanisław Koziej
- Succeeded by: Jacek Siewiera

Undersecretary of State at the Ministry of Interior and Administration
- In office November 2005 – November 2007

Personal details
- Born: Paweł Krzysztof Soloch; 3 February 1962 (age 64) Szczecin, Poland
- Children: 2
- Education: University of Warsaw
- Profession: diplomat, politician, historian

Paweł Krzysztof Soloch (born 3 February 1962) is a Polish politician and official. From August 2023 to 2026 he represented Poland as the Ambassador to Romania. Prior to that, he was the Head of the National Security Bureau (2015–2022).

== Biography ==
Soloch was born in Szczecin, and attended high school there. In 1989, he graduated from the Faculty of History at the University of Warsaw. He completed postgraduate studies at the Institut De Hautes Etudes En Administration Publique in Lausanne (1990–1991) and École nationale d'administration, Strasbourg-Paris (1994–1995).

In 1989, he worked in the National Electoral Office of the Solidarity Citizens' Committee. From 1990 to 1992, he worked as a specialist at the Foundation for the Development of Local Democracy.

Between 1992 and 1998, he worked for the Ministry of Foreign Affairs, the Department of Security Policy, and the Ministry of Defence, the Defence Policy Office and the Strategic Studies Department. From 1998 to 1999, he was adviser to the Prime Minister and then deputy director of the Department of Defence Affairs at the Chancellery of the Prime Minister of Poland. From 1999 to 2001 he was acting director of the Department of Public Security at the Ministry of Interior and Administration.

Between 1999 and 2005, he was working also as an assistant at the Polish Academy of Sciences, the Institute of Political Studies. He was also lecturer of the Melchior Wańkowicz School of Journalism in Warsaw and the University of Social Sciences and Humanities in Warsaw.

In 2004, he became chief specialist and then advisor at the Warsaw City Hall. Between 2005 and 2007, he served as the Undersecretary of State, Head of National Civil Defence at the Ministry of Interior and Administration. Next, until 2010, he was advisor to the Head of the National Security Bureau. In 2010, he joined the Sobieski Institute think tank which he was presiding from 2013 to 2015. He was also lecturer at the National School of Public Administration (2013–2014).

From 2015 to 2022, he held the position of the Secretary of State, Head of the National Security Bureau. Since 10 October 2022, he was public advisor to the President of Poland.

On 13 June 2023, Soloch was nominated Poland Ambassador to Romania. He took the post in August 2023. He ended his mission on 30 October 2026.

He is married, with two children.

== Honours ==
- 2000 – Bronze Cross of Merit, Poland
- 2007 – Honorary Citizen of Gmina Mszana Dolna
- 2015 – Grand Officer of the Order of Leopold II, Belgium
- 2016 – Grand Cross of the Royal Norwegian Order of Merit, Norway
- 2017 – Commander, First Class, of the Order of the Lion of Finland, Finland
- 2018 – First Class Medal of the National Security and Defence Council of Ukraine, Ukraine
- 2019 – Grand Cross of the Order of the Star of Romania, Romania
- 2019 – Grand Commander of the Order for Merits to Lithuania, Lithuania
- 2022 – „Defender of Ukraine” Medal, Ukraine
- 2022 – Officer of the Order of Polonia Restituta, Poland
- 2023 – Cross of Recognition, 2nd class, Latvia
