= List of ambassadors of Sweden to Ukraine =

Ambassador of Sweden to Ukraine
- Lesser coat of arms of the Kingdom of Sweden

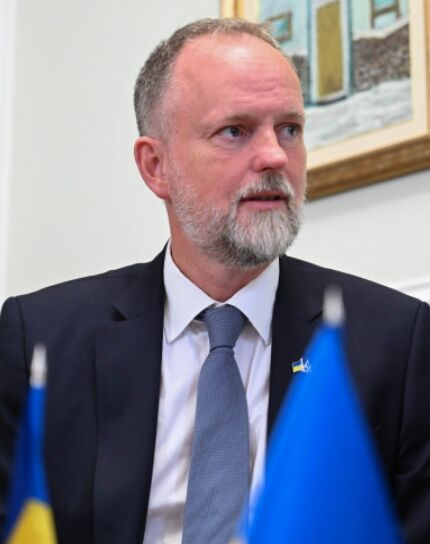
- Incumbent; Martin Åberg since August 2023
- Ministry for Foreign Affairs; Swedish Embassy, Kyiv
- Style: His or Her Excellency (formal); Mr. or Madam Ambassador (informal)
- Reports to: Minister for Foreign Affairs
- Seat: Kyiv, Ukraine
- Appointer: Government of Sweden
- Term length: No fixed term
- Inaugural holder: Martin Hallqvist
- Formation: 1992
- Website: Swedish Embassy, Kyiv

The Ambassador of Sweden to Ukraine (known formally as the Ambassador of the Kingdom of Sweden to Ukraine) is the official representative of the government of Sweden to the president of Ukraine and government of Ukraine.

== History ==
On 19 December 1991, the Swedish government recognized Ukraine as an independent state. The Swedish government decided on 9 January 1992, to enter into an agreement with Ukraine to establish diplomatic relations. The agreement came into effect on 13 January 1992. It was signed in Kyiv by Sweden's Foreign Minister, Margaretha af Ugglas, and Ukraine's Foreign Minister, Anatoliy Zlenko.

== List of representatives ==
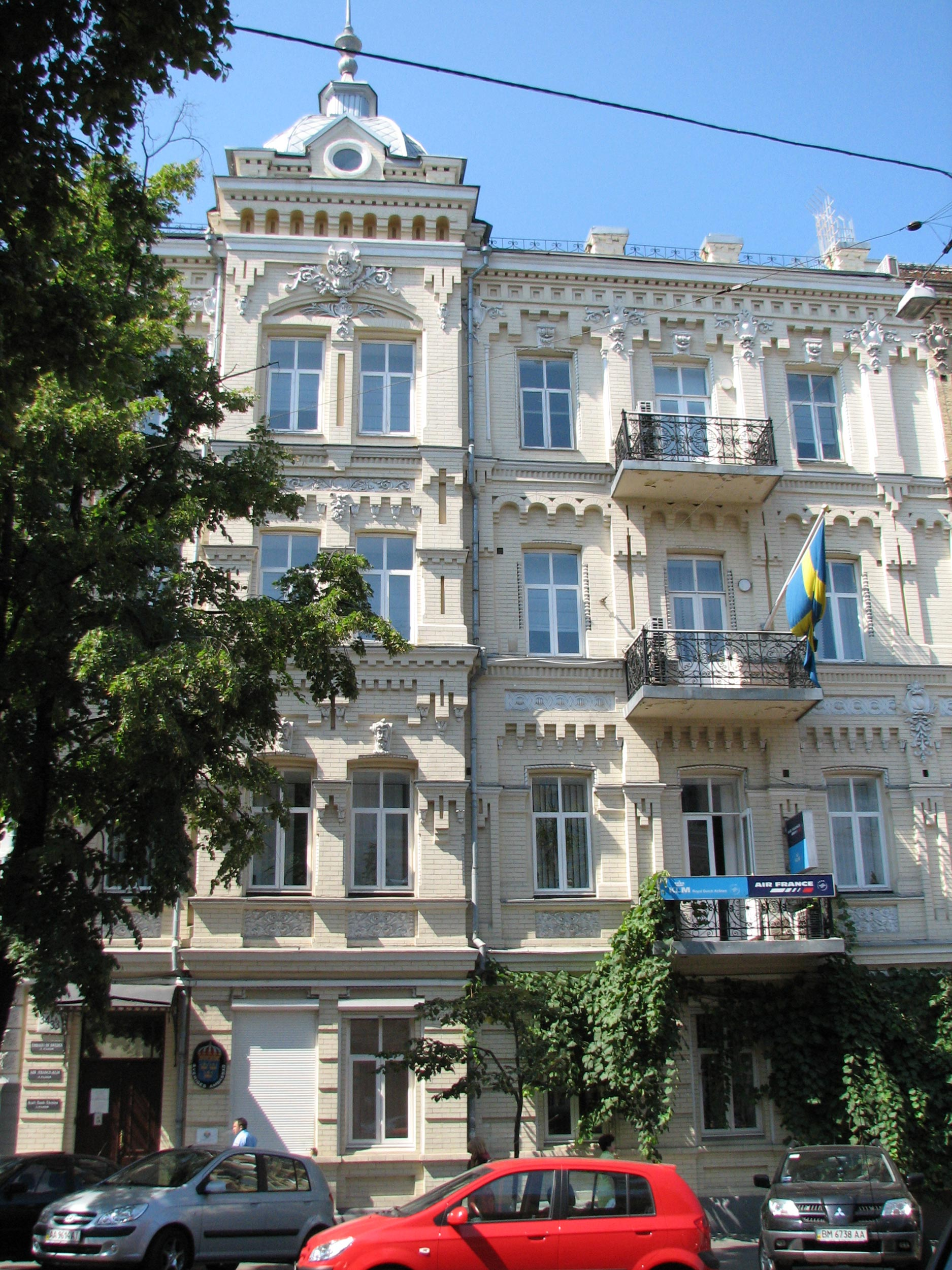
The Swedish Embassy on vul. Ivana Franka 34/33 in Kyiv.

The Swedish embassy in Kyiv was opened in 1992 with its location at Hotel National on vul. Rozi Luksemburg 5. Since 1997 the embassy is located at vul. Ivana Franka 34/33.

| Name | Period | Title | Notes | Presented credentials | Ref |
|---|---|---|---|---|---|
| Mats Staffansson | 1992–1992 | Chargé d'affaires | | | |
| Martin Hallqvist | 1992–1996 | Ambassador | | | |
| Göran Jacobsson | 1996–2000 | Ambassador | Also accredited to Chișinău (from 1998). | | |
| Åke Peterson | 2000–2004 | Ambassador | | | |
| John-Christer Åhlander | 2004–2008 | Ambassador | | | |
| Stefan Gullgren | 2009–2013 | Ambassador | | | |
| Andreas von Beckerath | 2013–2016 | Ambassador | | | |
| Martin Hagström | September 2016 – 2019 | Ambassador | | | |
| Tobias Thyberg | 1 September 2019 – 2023 | Ambassador | | | |
| Martin Åberg | August 2023 – present | Ambassador | | 17 August 2023 | |

Since 2000 there is also a Swedish honorary consulate in Kakhovka, Kherson Oblast in southern Ukraine.

| In office | Consuls in Kakhovka |
|---|---|
| 2000–present | Carl Sturén |

== Swedish representatives in the Ukrainian part of the Russian Empire ==
Sweden also had several consuls and vice-consuls in the Ukrainian part of the Russian Empire. The diplomatic representations were formally in function until 1924, but in reality until about 1920. There were consuls in Odesa, Kharkiv and Kyiv and vice-consuls (most often non-Swedes) in Berdiansk, Kerch, Mariupol, Mykolaiv, Odesa, Sevastopol and Taganrog.

| In office | Consuls in Odesa |
|---|---|
| 1824–1857 | John Wilkins |
| 1857–1882 | Ignace von Ephrussi |
| 1882–1900 | Robert Wilkins |
| 1900–1902 | vacant |
| 1902–1924 | Oscar Mauritz Heribert Osberg |

| In office | Consuls in Kharkiv |
|---|---|
| 1908–1924 | Adolf Gustaf Münch |

| In office | Consuls in Kyiv |
|---|---|
| 1908–1916 | Michael Teofilovitj Bukowinski |
| 1916–1917 | Claude Gustaf Hjalmar de Laval |
| 1918 | vacant |
| 1919–1924 | Theodor Harald Focker |

| In office | Vice-Consuls in Berdiansk |
|---|---|
| 1848–1889 | Giovanni Gasparo Ivancich |
| 1889–1916 | Andronic Paicos |
| 1916–1924 | Edgar Borchert |

| In office | Vice-Consuls in Kerch |
|---|---|
| 1869–1902 | François Tomasini della Torre |

| In office | Vice-Consuls in Mariupol |
|---|---|
| 1871–1898 | Giovanni Battista Chiozzo |

| In office | Vice-Consuls in Mykolaiv |
|---|---|
| 1874–1897 | Charles Huntley Lawton |
| 1897–1915 | Victor Bossalini |
| 1915–1924 | James Reginald Martin |

| In office | Vice-Consuls in Odesa |
|---|---|
| ?–1824 | John Wilkins |
| 1853–1882 | Robert Wilkins |
| 1882–1898 | vacant |
| 1898–1901 | Einar Jessen |

| In office | Vice-Consuls in Sevastopol |
|---|---|
| 1893–1902 | Nicolas Pierre Gripari |

== See also ==
- Sweden–Ukraine relations
- List of ambassadors of Ukraine to Sweden
