= Tobias Thyberg =

Swedish diplomat and politician (born 1975)

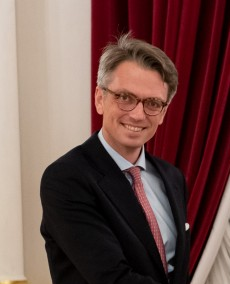
- Thyberg in 2019

National Security Advisor to the Government of Sweden
- In office 8 May 2025 – 9 May 2025
- Prime Minister: Ulf Kristersson
- Preceded by: Annika Brändström (acting)
- Succeeded by: Annika Brändström (acting)

Ambassador of Sweden to Ukraine
- In office August 2019 – August 2023
- Preceded by: Martin Hagström
- Succeeded by: Martin Åberg

Personal details
- Born: 12 September 1975 (age 51) Stockholm, Sweden
- Education: Uppsala University (M.Sc.); Stockholm School of Economics (M.Sc.)

Olof Tobias Sebastian Thyberg (born 12 September 1975) is a Swedish diplomat who served as National Security Advisor to the Government of Sweden from 8 to 9 May 2025. He resigned within 12 hours after his pictures from Grindr had surfaced. He was Ambassador of Sweden to Ukraine from 2019 to 2023.

== Biography ==
Tobias Thyberg was born in Stockholm on 12 September 1975.

He holds an M.Sc. in political science from the Uppsala University and an M.Sc. in international economics from the Stockholm School of Economics. He speaks Swedish, English, Russian, French, Spanish and German.

Tobias Thyberg is a career diplomat who served as Ambassador of Sweden to Afghanistan until August 2019. His previous diplomatic postings include Swedish missions in New Delhi, Moscow, Washington, D.C., as well as the Swedish Representation to the European Union in Brussels and the Delegation of the European Union to Georgia.

On 8 May 2025, he was appointed as National Security Advisor to the Government of Sweden, but resigned 12 hours later on 9 May after sensitive pictures of him on the dating app Grindr were anonymously sent to the government.

== Personal life ==
Thyberg lives in central Stockholm with his husband Florian Fuckner, a German citizen.

Diplomatic posts
Preceded by Anders Sjöberg	Ambassador of Sweden to Afghanistan; 2017–2019	Succeeded by Caroline Vicini
Preceded by Martin Hagström	Ambassador of Sweden to Ukraine; 2019–2023	Succeeded by Martin Åberg
Government offices
Preceded by Annika Brändström (acting)	National Security Advisor to the Government of Sweden; 2025	Vacant
