= Maciej Górski (politician) =

Polish diarist and politician (1944–2020)

Poland Ambassador to Greece
- In office 2005–2006
- Appointed by: Aleksander Kwaśniewski
- President: Karolos Papoulias
- Preceded by: Grzegorz Dziemidowicz
- Succeeded by: Michał Klinger

Undersecretary of State in the Ministry of National Defence
- In office 2003–2005

Poland Ambassador to Italy
- In office 1996–2001
- Appointed by: Aleksander Kwaśniewski
- President: Oscar Luigi Scalfaro; Carlo Azeglio Ciampi
- Preceded by: Bolesław Michałek
- Succeeded by: Michał Radlicki

Personal details
- Born: 27 January 1944 Warsaw, Poland
- Died: 5 January 2020 (aged 75)
- Education: University of Warsaw
- Profession: Diplomat, diarist, politician

Maciej Górski (27 January 1944 – 5 January 2020) was a Polish diarist and politician.

== Life ==
Górski was born in Warsaw. In 1966, he graduated from law at the University of Warsaw. He worked for Życie Warszawy and the Polish news agency and publishing house Interpress. He was correspondent in Stockholm, Rome, and the Vatican City. He was Vice Minister for Defence 2003–2005, and president Aleksander Kwaśniewski advisor for European affairs. Ambassador to Italy (1996–2001) and Greece (2005–2006).

In 1997, he received Knight Grand Cross with Collar of the Order of Merit of the Italian Republic.

Górski is buried at the Powązki Military Cemetery.
