= Stockholms ström =

Body of water in Stockholm, Sweden

Coordinates: 59°19′34.61″N 18°4′38.42″E

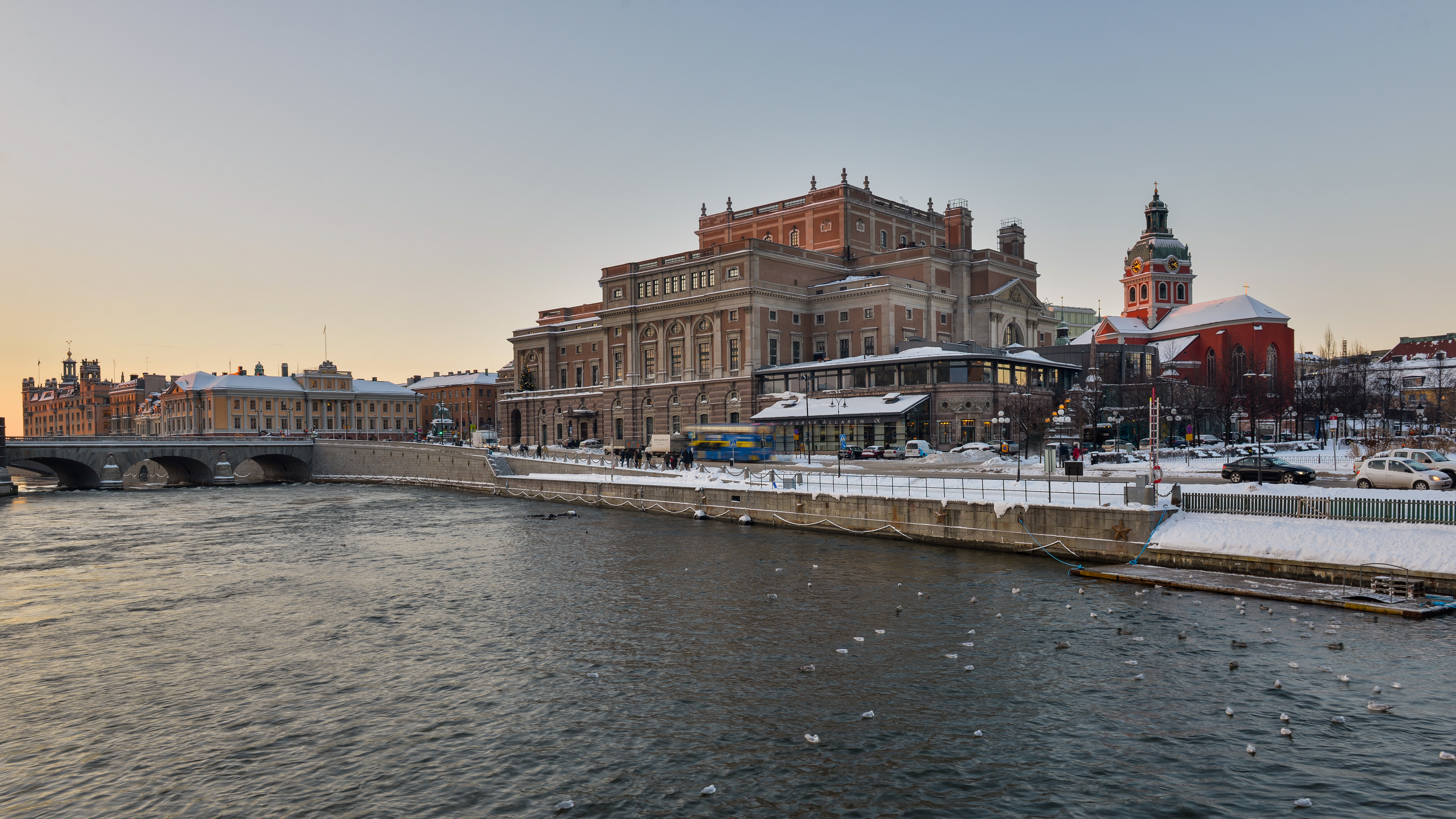
Stockholms ström in December 2012

Stockholms ström (The Stream of Stockholm), also known as Strömmen (The Stream), in Stockholm is the innermost part of Saltsjön, a bay of the Baltic Sea. It continues into Lake Mälaren through Norrström and Söderström.

== See also ==
- Geography of Stockholm
- Rivers of Sweden
