= Lists of ambassadors of Sweden =

List of ambassadors of Sweden may refer to:

== A ==
- List of ambassadors of Sweden to Afghanistan
- List of ambassadors of Sweden to Albania
- List of ambassadors of Sweden to Algeria
- List of ambassadors of Sweden to Angola
- List of ambassadors of Sweden to Argentina
- List of ambassadors of Sweden to Armenia
- List of ambassadors of Sweden to Australia
- List of ambassadors of Sweden to Austria
- List of ambassadors of Sweden to Azerbaijan

== B ==
- List of ambassadors of Sweden to Bahrain
- List of ambassadors of Sweden to Bangladesh
- List of ambassadors of Sweden to Barbados
- List of ambassadors of Sweden to Belarus
- List of ambassadors of Sweden to Belgium
- List of ambassadors of Sweden to Belize
- List of ambassadors of Sweden to Benin
- List of ambassadors of Sweden to Bolivia
- List of ambassadors of Sweden to Botswana
- List of ambassadors of Sweden to Brazil
- List of ambassadors of Sweden to Bulgaria
- List of ambassadors of Sweden to Burkina Faso

== C ==
- List of ambassadors of Sweden to Cambodia
- List of ambassadors of Sweden to Cameroon
- List of ambassadors of Sweden to Canada
- List of ambassadors of Sweden to the Central African Republic
- List of ambassadors of Sweden to Chad
- List of ambassadors of Sweden to Chile
- List of ambassadors of Sweden to China
- List of ambassadors of Sweden to Colombia
- List of ambassadors of Sweden to the Comoros
- List of ambassadors of Sweden to Croatia
- List of ambassadors of Sweden to Cuba
- List of ambassadors of Sweden to Cyprus
- List of ambassadors of Sweden to the Czech Republic
- List of ambassadors of Sweden to Czechoslovakia

== D ==
- List of ambassadors of Sweden to the Democratic Republic of the Congo
- List of ambassadors of Sweden to Denmark
- List of ambassadors of Sweden to Djibouti
- List of ambassadors of Sweden to the Dominican Republic

== E ==
- List of ambassadors of Sweden to East Germany
- List of ambassadors of Sweden to Ecuador
- List of ambassadors of Sweden to Egypt
- List of ambassadors of Sweden to Eritrea
- List of ambassadors of Sweden to Estonia
- List of ambassadors of Sweden to Eswatini
- List of ambassadors of Sweden to Ethiopia

== F ==
- List of ambassadors of Sweden to the Federated States of Micronesia
- List of ambassadors of Sweden to Fiji
- List of ambassadors of Sweden to Finland
- List of ambassadors of Sweden to France

== G ==
- List of ambassadors of Sweden to Gabon
- List of ambassadors of Sweden to Georgia
- List of ambassadors of Sweden to Germany
- List of ambassadors of Sweden to Ghana
- List of ambassadors of Sweden to Greece
- List of ambassadors of Sweden to Guatemala
- List of ambassadors of Sweden to Guinea
- List of ambassadors of Sweden to Guinea-Bissau
- List of ambassadors of Sweden to Guyana

== H ==
- List of ambassadors of Sweden to Haiti
- List of ambassadors of Sweden to the Holy See
- List of ambassadors of Sweden to Hungary

== I ==
- List of ambassadors of Sweden to Iceland
- List of ambassadors of Sweden to India
- List of ambassadors of Sweden to Indonesia
- List of ambassadors of Sweden to Iran
- List of ambassadors of Sweden to Iraq
- List of ambassadors of Sweden to Ireland
- List of ambassadors of Sweden to Israel
- List of ambassadors of Sweden to Italy
- List of ambassadors of Sweden to Ivory Coast

== J ==
- List of ambassadors of Sweden to Japan
- List of ambassadors of Sweden to Jordan

== K ==
- List of ambassadors of Sweden to Kazakhstan
- List of ambassadors of Sweden to Kenya
- List of ambassadors of Sweden to Kosovo
- List of ambassadors of Sweden to Kuwait
- List of ambassadors of Sweden to Kyrgyzstan

== L ==
- List of ambassadors of Sweden to Laos
- List of ambassadors of Sweden to Latvia
- List of ambassadors of Sweden to Lebanon
- List of ambassadors of Sweden to Liberia
- List of ambassadors of Sweden to Libya
- List of ambassadors of Sweden to Lithuania

== M ==
- List of ambassadors of Sweden to Madagascar
- List of ambassadors of Sweden to Malaysia
- List of ambassadors of Sweden to the Maldives
- List of ambassadors of Sweden to Mali
- List of ambassadors of Sweden to Marshall Islands
- List of ambassadors of Sweden to Mexico
- List of ambassadors of Sweden to Moldova
- List of ambassadors of Sweden to Montenegro
- List of ambassadors of Sweden to Morocco
- List of ambassadors of Sweden to Mozambique

== N ==
- List of ambassadors of Sweden to Namibia
- List of ambassadors of Sweden to the Netherlands
- List of ambassadors of Sweden to New Zealand
- List of ambassadors of Sweden to Nicaragua
- List of ambassadors of Sweden to Nigeria
- List of ambassadors of Sweden to North Korea
- List of ambassadors of Sweden to North Macedonia
- List of ambassadors of Sweden to North Yemen
- List of ambassadors of Sweden to Norway

== P–R ==
- List of ambassadors of Sweden to Pakistan
- List of ambassadors of Sweden to Palau
- List of ambassadors of Sweden to Papua New Guinea
- List of ambassadors of Sweden to Peru
- List of ambassadors of Sweden to the Philippines
- List of ambassadors of Sweden to Poland
- List of ambassadors of Sweden to Portugal
- List of ambassadors of Sweden to Qatar
- List of ambassadors of Sweden to Romania
- List of ambassadors of Sweden to Russia
- List of ambassadors of Sweden to Rwanda

== S ==
- List of ambassadors of Sweden to São Tomé and Príncipe
- List of ambassadors of Sweden to Saudi Arabia
- List of ambassadors of Sweden to Senegal
- List of ambassadors of Sweden to Serbia
- List of ambassadors of Sweden to Seychelles
- List of ambassadors of Sweden to Singapore
- List of ambassadors of Sweden to Slovakia
- List of ambassadors of Sweden to Slovenia
- List of ambassadors of Sweden to the Solomon Islands
- List of ambassadors of Sweden to Somalia
- List of ambassadors of Sweden to South Africa
- List of ambassadors of Sweden to South Korea
- List of ambassadors of Sweden to South Yemen
- List of ambassadors of Sweden to Spain
- List of ambassadors of Sweden to Sudan
- List of ambassadors of Sweden to Switzerland
- List of ambassadors of Sweden to Syria

== T ==
- List of ambassadors of Sweden to Tajikistan
- List of ambassadors of Sweden to Tanzania
- List of ambassadors of Sweden to Thailand
- List of ambassadors of Sweden to Timor-Leste
- List of ambassadors of Sweden to Togo
- List of ambassadors of Sweden to Trinidad and Tobago
- List of ambassadors of Sweden to Tunisia
- List of ambassadors of Sweden to Turkey
- List of ambassadors of Sweden to Turkmenistan

== U–Z ==
- List of ambassadors of Sweden to Uganda
- List of ambassadors of Sweden to Ukraine
- List of ambassadors of Sweden to the United Arab Emirates
- List of ambassadors of Sweden to the United Kingdom
- List of ambassadors of Sweden to the United States
- List of ambassadors of Sweden to Uruguay
- List of ambassadors of Sweden to Uzbekistan
- List of ambassadors of Sweden to Venezuela
- List of ambassadors of Sweden to Vietnam
- List of ambassadors of Sweden to Yemen
- List of ambassadors of Sweden to Yugoslavia
- List of ambassadors of Sweden to Zambia
- List of ambassadors of Sweden to Zimbabwe
