= List of ambassadors of Sweden to Azerbaijan =

Ambassador of Sweden to Azerbaijan
- Lesser coat of arms of the Kingdom of Sweden

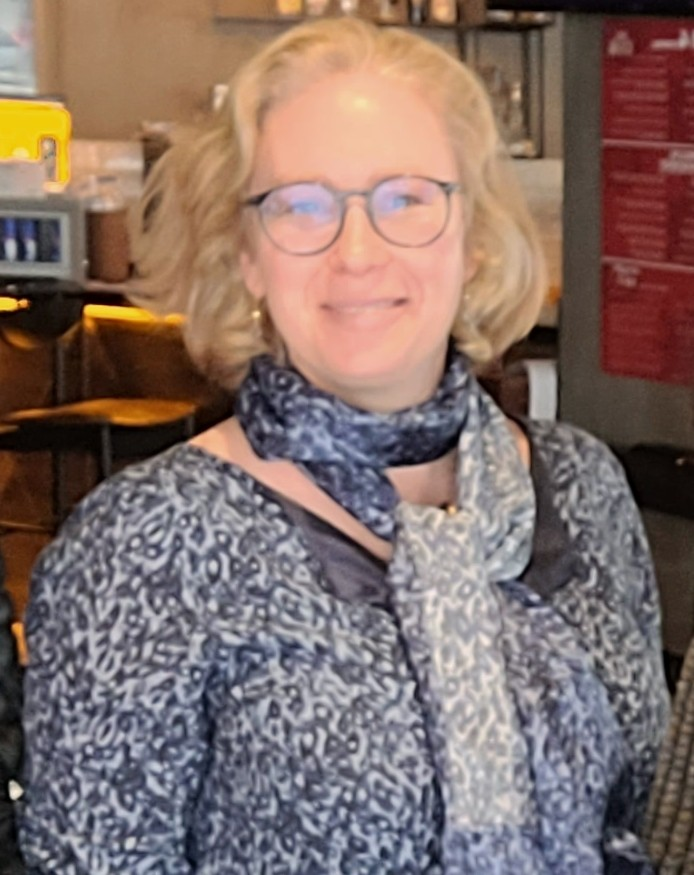
- Incumbent; Louise Morsing since August 2026
- Ministry for Foreign Affairs; Swedish Embassy, Baku
- Style: His or Her Excellency (formal); Mr. or Madam Ambassador (informal)
- Reports to: Minister for Foreign Affairs
- Seat: Baku, Azerbaijan
- Appointer: Government of Sweden
- Term length: No fixed term
- Inaugural holder: Örjan Berner
- Formation: 1992
- Website: Swedish Embassy, Baku

The Ambassador of Sweden to Azerbaijan (known formally as the Ambassador of the Kingdom of Sweden to the Republic of Azerbaijan) is the official representative of the government of Sweden to the president of Azerbaijan and government of Azerbaijan.

== History ==
In a report on the reorganization of the Ministry for Foreign Affairs in early January 1921, it was proposed that the head of mission in Constantinople also be accredited to Baku, Sofia, Belgrade, Athens, Tbilisi, and eventually Armenia. However, the experts recommended that, for the time being, the minister be accredited only to Sofia.

On 16 January 1992, the Swedish government recognized the Republic of Azerbaijan as an independent state. On 7 May 1992, the Swedish government decided to enter into an agreement with Azerbaijan to establish diplomatic relations. The agreement entered into force on 8 May 1992, upon its signing in Baku by Ambassador Örjan Berner on behalf of Sweden, and Hussein Sadychov on behalf of Azerbaijan. That same year, Sweden's ambassador in Moscow, Örjan Berner, was also accredited as ambassador to Azerbaijan.

The ambassador in Moscow remained accredited to Azerbaijan's capital, Baku, until 2006, when a Stockholm-based ambassador for the Caucasus region (Armenia, Azerbaijan, Georgia) assumed the accreditation.

Sweden opened an embassy in Baku on 3 March 2014. As before, the ambassador was based in Stockholm. In the absence of the ambassador, the embassy was headed by a chargé d'affaires ad interim. Until the embassy's opening, Sweden had been represented in Azerbaijan by an honorary consulate (established in February 1998). The honorary consulate was closed in connection with the opening of the Swedish embassy. The embassy was officially inaugurated by the Minister for Foreign Trade, Ewa Björling, on 12 June 2014.

== List of representatives ==
Name	Period	Resident / Non-resident	Title	Resident / Concurrent accreditation	Notes	Presented credentials	Ref
Örjan Berner	1992–1994	Non-resident	Ambassador	Resident in Moscow			
Sven Hirdman	1994–1997	Non-resident	Ambassador	Resident in Moscow			
Michael Sahlin	1997–1998	Non-resident	Ambassador	Resident in Ankara			
Henrik Liljegren	1998–2001	Non-resident	Ambassador	Resident in Ankara			
Ann Dismorr	2001–2005	Non-resident	Ambassador	Resident in Ankara			
Hans Adén	September 2006 – 2010	Non-resident	Ambassador	Resident in Stockholm			
Mikael Eriksson	March 2011 – October 2015	Non-resident	Ambassador	Resident in Stockholm		2 December 2011	
Tomas Danestad	2014 – July 2017	Resident	Chargé d'affaires ad interim				
Ingrid Tersman	2015–2020	Non-resident	Ambassador	Resident in Stockholm		18 January 2016	
Christian Kamill	September 2017 – September 2020	Resident	Chargé d'affaires ad interim				
Christian Kamill	September 2020 – 2022	Resident	Ambassador	Also accredited to Bishkek		24 September 2020	
Tobias Lorentzson	August 2022 – 2026	Resident	Ambassador			16 August 2022	
Louise Morsing	August 2026 – present	Resident	Ambassador				

== Gallery ==
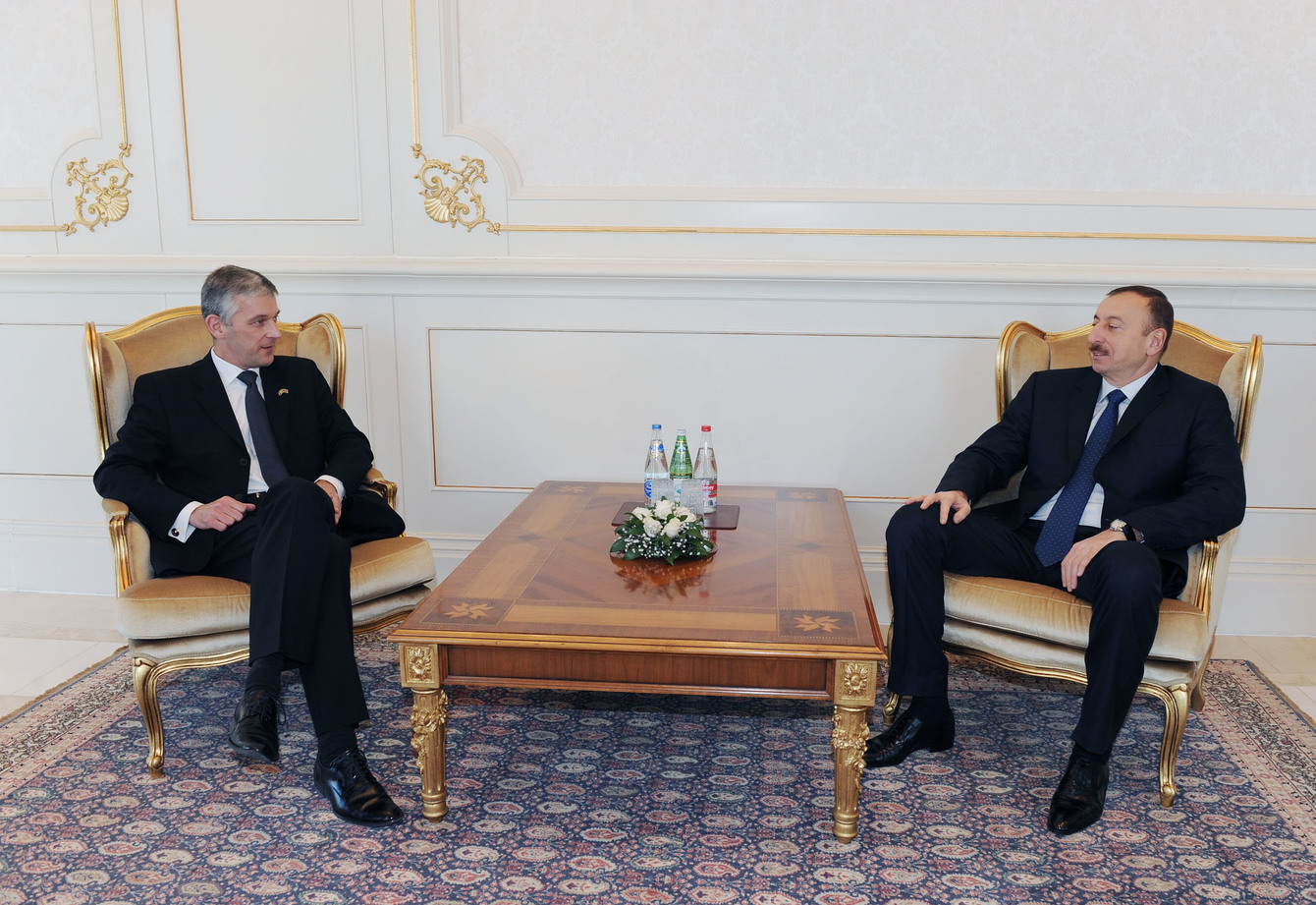
Ambassador Mikael Eriksson (2011–2015) with President Ilham Aliyev.

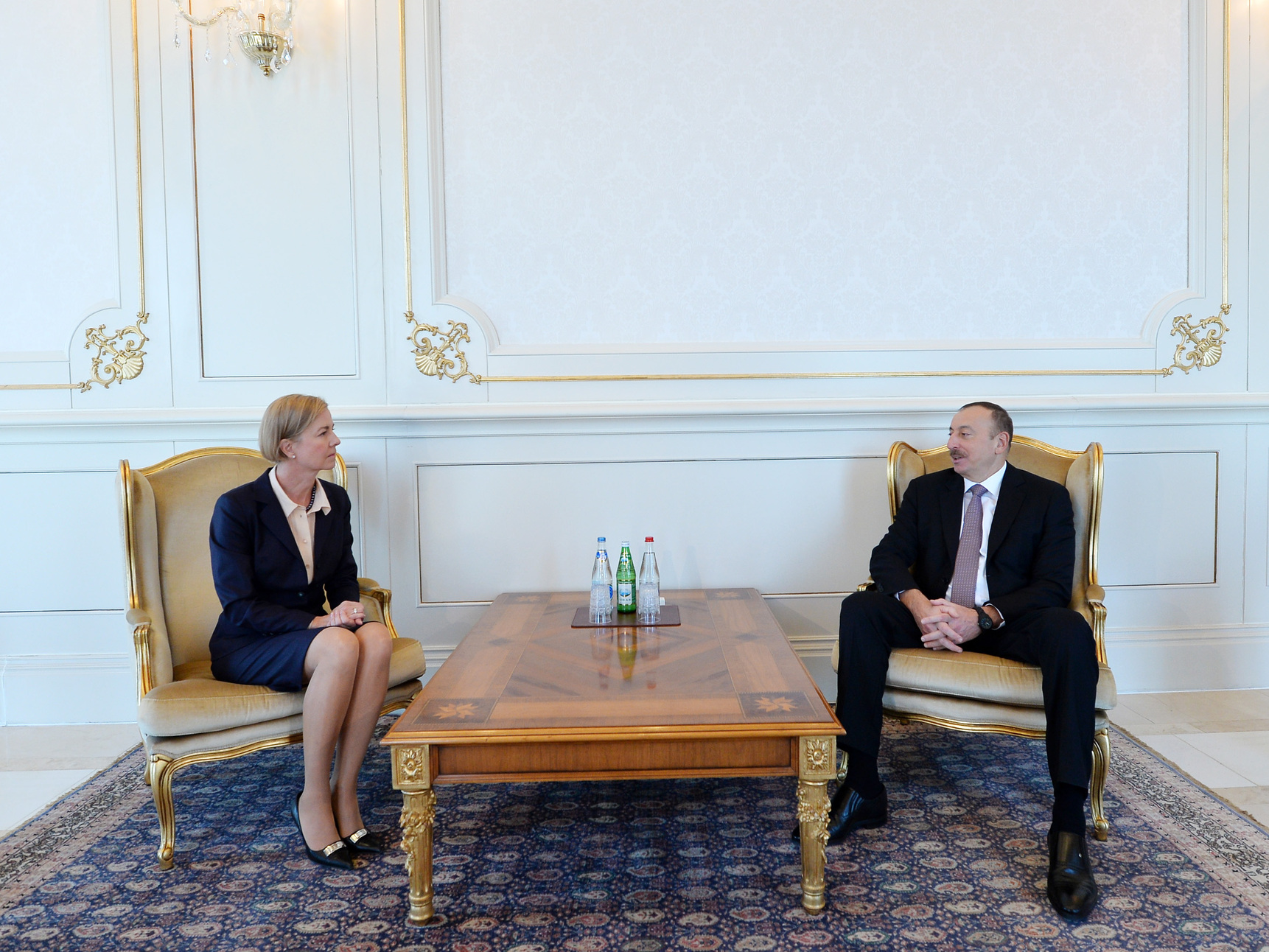
Ambassador Ingrid Tersman (2015–2020) with President Ilham Aliyev.

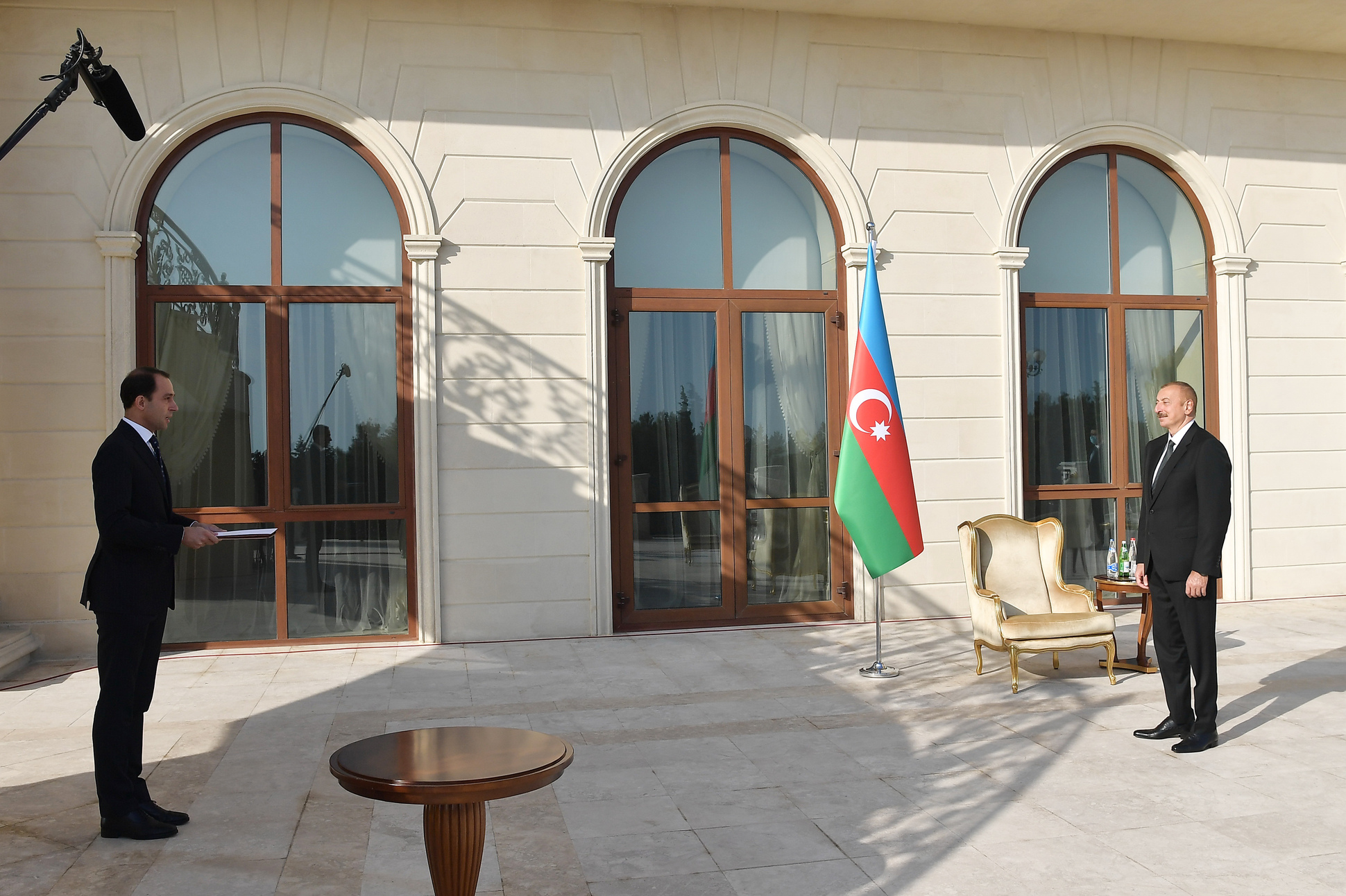
Ambassador Christian Kamill (2020–2022) with President Ilham Aliyev.

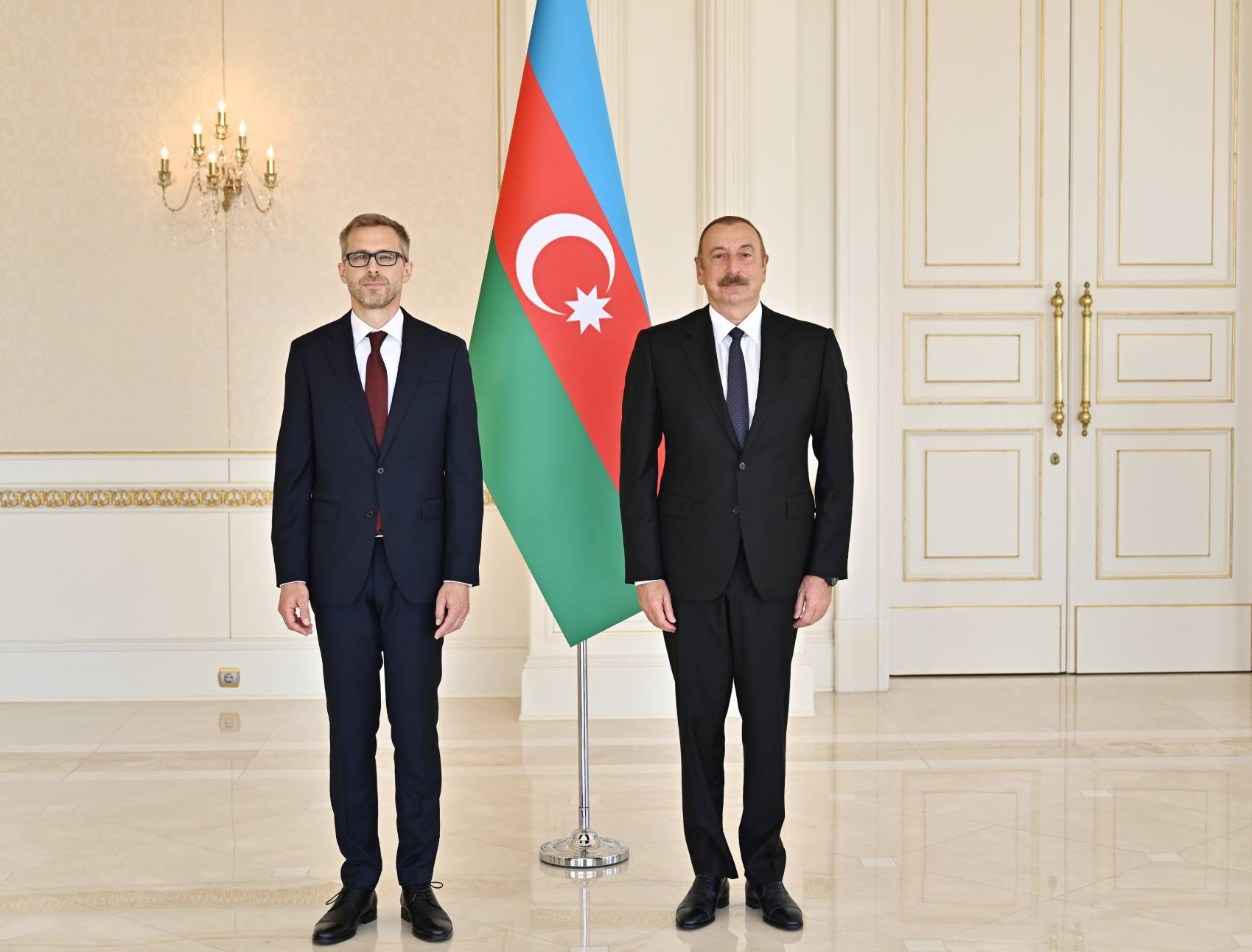
Ambassador Tobias Lorentzson (2022–present) with President Ilham Aliyev.

== See also ==
- Azerbaijan–Sweden relations
