= List of ambassadors of Sweden to Georgia =

Ambassador of Sweden to Georgia
- Lesser coat of arms of the Kingdom of Sweden
- Incumbent; David Emtestam since August 2026
- Ministry for Foreign Affairs; Swedish Embassy, Tbilisi
- Style: His or Her Excellency (formal); Mr. or Madam Ambassador (informal)
- Reports to: Minister for Foreign Affairs
- Seat: Tbilisi, Georgia
- Appointer: Government of Sweden
- Term length: No fixed term
- Inaugural holder: Örjan Berner
- Formation: 1992
- Website: Swedish Embassy, Tbilisi

The Ambassador of Sweden to Georgia (known formally as the Ambassador of the Kingdom of Sweden to Georgia) is the official representative of the government of Sweden to the government of Georgia and the president of Georgia.

== History ==
In a report on the reorganization of the Ministry for Foreign Affairs in early January 1921, it was proposed that the head of mission in Constantinople also be accredited to Sofia, Belgrade, Athens, Tbilisi, Baku, and eventually Armenia. However, the experts recommended that, for the time being, the minister be accredited only to Sofia.

On 2 April 1992, the Swedish government recognized the Republic of Georgia, as the last of the former Soviet republics. On 25 June 1992, the Swedish government decided to enter into an agreement with Georgia to establish diplomatic relations. The agreement entered into force on 19 September 1992, upon its signing in Moscow by Ambassador Örjan Berner on behalf of Sweden, and Pedo Japaridze on behalf of Georgia . That same year, Sweden's ambassador in Moscow, Örjan Berner, was also accredited as ambassador to Georgia.

The ambassador in Moscow remained accredited to Georgia's capital, Tbilisi, until 2006, when a Stockholm-based ambassador for the Caucasus region (Armenia, Azerbaijan, Georgia) assumed the accreditation. In 2010, Sweden opened an embassy in Tbilisi. The ambassador there was then also accredited to Yerevan, Armenia until 2020 when the a Swedish ambassador resident in Yerevan was appointed.

== List of representatives ==
Name	Period	Title	Notes	Ref
Örjan Berner	1992–1994	Ambassador	Resident in Moscow.	
Sven Hirdman	1994–2004	Ambassador	Resident in Moscow.	
Johan Molander	2004–2006	Ambassador	Resident in Moscow.	
Hans Adén	September 2006 – 2010	Ambassador	Resident in Stockholm.	
Diana Janse	2010–2014	Ambassador	Also accredited to Yerevan.	
Martina Quick	2014–2018	Ambassador	Also accredited to Yerevan.	
Ulrik Tideström	1 September 2018 – 2023	Ambassador	Also accredited to Yerevan (until 2020).	
Anna Lyberg	15 August 2023 – 2026	Ambassador		
David Emtestam	August 2026 – present	Ambassador		
