= List of ambassadors of Sweden to Armenia =

Ambassador of Sweden to Armenia
- Lesser coat of arms of the Kingdom of Sweden
- Incumbent; Eva Sundquist since 2025
- Ministry for Foreign Affairs; Swedish Embassy, Yerevan
- Style: His or Her Excellency (formal); Mr. or Madam Ambassador (informal)
- Reports to: Minister for Foreign Affairs
- Seat: Yerevan, Armenia
- Appointer: Government of Sweden
- Term length: No fixed term
- Inaugural holder: Örjan Berner
- Formation: 1992
- Website: Swedish Embassy, Yerevan

The Ambassador of Sweden to Armenia (known formally as the Ambassador of the Kingdom of Sweden to the Republic of Armenia) is the official representative of the government of Sweden to the president of Armenia and government of Armenia.

== History ==
In a report on the reorganization of the Ministry for Foreign Affairs in early January 1921, it was proposed that the head of mission in Constantinople also be accredited to Sofia, Belgrade, Athens, Tbilisi, Baku, and eventually Armenia. However, the experts recommended that, for the time being, the minister be accredited only to Sofia.

On 16 January 1992, the Swedish government recognized the Republic of Armenia as an independent state. On 8 July 1992, the Swedish government decided to enter into an agreement with Armenia to establish diplomatic relations. The agreement entered into force on 10 July 1992, upon its signing in Helsinki by Foreign Minister Margaretha af Ugglas on behalf of Sweden, and Foreign Minister Raffi Hovannisian on behalf of Armenia. That same year, Sweden's ambassador in Moscow, Örjan Berner, was also accredited as ambassador to Armenia.

The ambassador in Moscow remained accredited to Armenia's capital, Yerevan, until 2006, when a Stockholm-based ambassador for the Caucasus region (Armenia, Azerbaijan, Georgia) assumed the accreditation. In 2010, Sweden opened an embassy in Tbilisi, the capital of Georgia. The ambassador there was then also accredited to Yerevan.

In March 2014, Sweden opened an embassy in Yerevan. The embassy was inaugurated on 13 June 2014 by Trade Minister Ewa Björling. The embassy was managed by a chargé d'affaires ad interim in the ambassador's absence. Since 2020, Sweden has had a resident ambassador in Yerevan.

== List of representatives ==
Name	Period	Title	Resident / Concurrent accreditation	Notes	Presented credentials	Ref
Örjan Berner	1992–1994	Ambassador	Resident in Moscow			
Sven Hirdman	1994–2004	Ambassador	Resident in Moscow			
Johan Molander	2004–2006	Ambassador	Resident in Moscow			
Hans Adén	September 2006 – 2010	Ambassador	Resident in Stockholm			
Diana Janse	2011–2014	Ambassador	Resident in Tbilisi		23 March 2011	
Mårten Ehnberg	7 August 2014 – 2016	Chargé d'affaires				
Martina Quick	2015–2018	Ambassador	Resident in Tbilisi		17 February 2015	
Margareta Kristianson	September 2016 – 2017	Chargé d'affaires ad interim				
Martin Fredriksson	2017–2019	Chargé d'affaires ad interim (Note: He held the following diplomatic rank: minister counsellor)				
Ulrik Tideström	2018–2020	Ambassador	Resident in Tbilisi		6 November 2018	
Birger Karlsson	2019–2020	Chargé d'affaires ad interim (Note: He held the following diplomatic rank: minister counsellor)				
Patrik Svensson	September 2020 – 2025	Ambassador			24 September 2020	
Eva Sundquist	2025–present	Ambassador			15 September 2025	
