= Örjan Berner =

Swedish diplomat (born 1937)

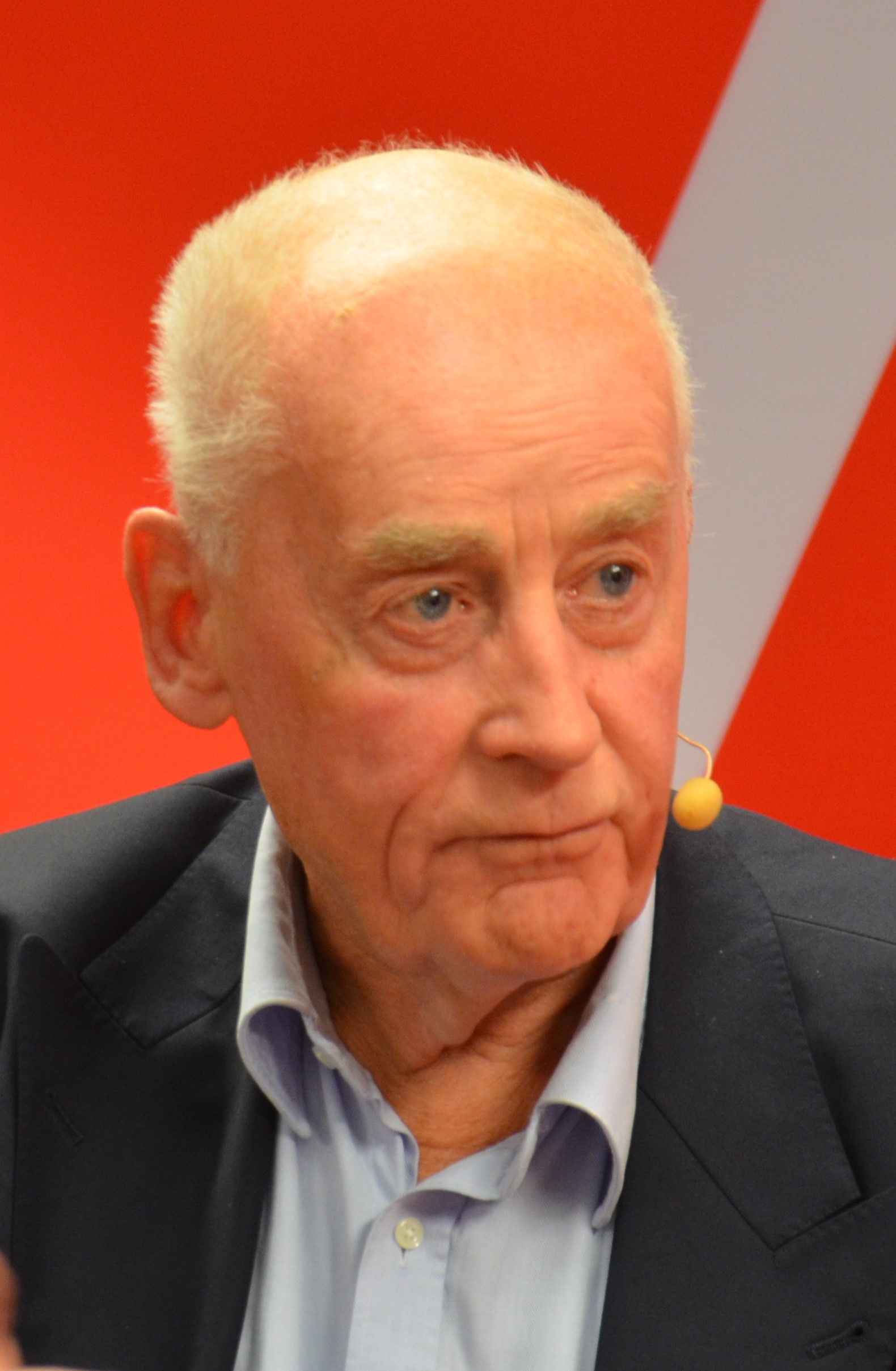
- Berner in 2014.
- Born: Carl Otto Örjan Berner; 15 November 1937 (age 88); Lund, Sweden
- Education: Lund University
- Occupation: Diplomat
- Years active: 1960–2001
- Spouse(s): Kristin Svensson (m. 1978; died 1979) Benedicte Eyde
- Children: 3

Carl Otto Örjan Berner (born 15 November 1937) is a Swedish diplomat. Berner began his diplomatic career in 1960 and held various positions, including serving at the Swedish UN delegation, SIPRI, and embassies in Beijing and Moscow. He later became ambassador to multiple countries, including Poland, India, and Russia, where he was also accredited to several former Soviet republics. His final postings were as ambassador to Bonn and Paris before retiring in 2001. After retirement, he remained active in international relations, serving on boards and advising organizations focused on Swedish-Russian cooperation.

== Early life ==
Berner was born on 15 November 1937 in Lund, Sweden, the son of Carl Berner, an agricultural engineer, and his wife Karin (née Sylwan). During his studies, in November 1958, Berner was awarded a scholarship from the Countess Anna Bogeman-Stackelberg Foundation (Grevinnan Anna Bogeman-Stackelbergs stiftelse), along with, among others, Pär Kettis and Henrik Liljegren. He earned a Candidate of Law degree from Lund University in 1960.

== Career ==
Berner was hired as an attaché at the Ministry for Foreign Affairs in Stockholm in 1960. He served at the Swedish UN delegation in New York City from 1961 to 1964, as deputy director at the Stockholm International Peace Research Institute from 1966 to 1967, and as first secretary at the Swedish embassy in Beijing from 1968 to 1971. He then held the same position at the Swedish embassy in Moscow from 1971 to 1974 before becoming a desk officer (departementssekreterare) at the political department of the Ministry for Foreign Affairs in 1976. From 1978 to 1983, he served as minister at the Swedish embassy in Paris.

In 1983–1984, he studied at the Center for International Affairs at Harvard University. Berner was appointed ambassador to Warsaw (1984–1987) and New Delhi (1987–1989), where he was also accredited to Sri Lanka, Nepal, and Bhutan. He then served as ambassador to Moscow (1989–1994). During his posting in Moscow, he was also accredited to Mongolia (1989–1992), Armenia (1992–1994), Azerbaijan (1992–1994), Georgia (1992–1994), Belarus (1992–1994), Kazakhstan (1993–1994), Kyrgyzstan (1993–1994), Tajikistan (1993–1994), Turkmenistan (1993–1994), and Uzbekistan (1993–1994). He later served as ambassador to Bonn (1994–1996) and Paris (1996–2001) before retiring.

Berner is a board member of the Sverker Åström Foundation, which promotes Swedish-Russian relations. He has also been an advisor to East Capital, secretary-general of Swedes Worldwide (Svenskar i Världen, SVIV), chairman of the Swedish branch of Transparency International, and chairman of several Swedish-Russian companies, including Vostok Oil Ltd (until 2004).

== Personal life ==
In May 1978, at the Stockholm City Court, Berner married embassy secretary Kristin Svensson (1948–1979), daughter of Gustav Svensson and Molka (née Mutas). Svensson died due to cancer less than a year later. In 1981, Berner wrote a book about his wife's battle with cancer.

Berner later remarried Benedicte Eyde (born 1955), the daughter of Sigurd Mörner-Eyde and Kate (née Schröder). They have three children.

== Awards and decorations ==
- (Sweden) H. M. The King's Medal, 12th size gold (silver-gilt) medal worn around the neck on the Order of the Seraphim ribbon (2011)

== Bibliography ==
- Berner, Örjan (2020). Krig eller fred: ödesdigra beslut i kristider [War or peace: fateful decisions in times of crisis] (in Swedish). Stockholm: Carlssons. ISBN 9789189063242. SELIBR dqv53pn7b2zt4cct.
- Berner, Örjan (2018). I revolutionens Peking: intriger, drömmar, stormaktsspel [In the Beijing of the Revolution: Intrigues, Dreams, Great Power Games] (in Swedish). Stockholm: Carlssons. ISBN 9789173318808. SELIBR 21555612.
- Berner, Örjan (2014). Härskarna i Kreml: från Gorbatjov till Putin [The rulers of the Kremlin: from Gorbachev to Putin] (in Swedish). Stockholm: Bonnier. ISBN 9789100143480. SELIBR 16464733.
- Berner, Örjan (1986). Soviet policies toward the Nordic countries. Lanham, Md.: Univ. Press of America. ISBN 0819153818. SELIBR 5768520.
- Berner, Örjan (1985). Sovjet & Norden [The Soviet Union and the Nordic countries] (in Swedish). Stockholm: Bonnier fakta. ISBN 9134505628. SELIBR 7246951.
- Berner, Örjan (1981). Kristin Svensson (in Swedish). Stockholm: Tiden. ISBN 9155025277. SELIBR 7420884.
- Berner, Örjan (1969). Kinas ekonomi och handel 1968-69 [China's economy and trade 1968-69] (in Swedish). Stockholm. SELIBR 11890546.
- Berner, Örjan (1965). U-landsbiståndet: de internationella organens verksamhet [Developing country aid: the activities of international bodies]. Världspolitikens dagsfrågor, 0042-2754 ; 1965:4 (in Swedish). Stockholm: Utrikespolitiska institutet. SELIBR 557335.

Diplomatic posts
Preceded by Knut Thyberg	Ambassador of Sweden to Poland; 1984–1987	Succeeded by Jean-Christophe Öberg
Preceded by Axel Edelstam	Ambassador of Sweden to India; 1987–1989	Succeeded by Pär Kettis
Preceded by Axel Edelstam	Ambassador of Sweden to Sri Lanka; 1987–1989	Succeeded by Pär Kettis
Preceded by Axel Edelstam	Ambassador of Sweden to Nepal; 1987–1989	Succeeded by Pär Kettis
Preceded by Axel Edelstam	Ambassador of Sweden to Bhutan; 1987–1989	Succeeded by Pär Kettis
Preceded by Anders Thunborg	Ambassador of Sweden to Russia; 1989–1994	Succeeded by Sven Hirdman
Preceded by Anders Thunborg	Ambassador of Sweden to Mongolia; 1989–1992	Succeeded by Sven Linder
Preceded by None	Ambassador of Sweden to Armenia; 1992–1994	Succeeded by Sven Hirdman
Preceded by None	Ambassador of Sweden to Azerbaijan; 1992–1994	Succeeded by Sven Hirdman
Preceded by None	Ambassador of Sweden to Belarus; 1992–1994	Succeeded by Sven Hirdman
Preceded by None	Ambassador of Sweden to Georgia; 1992–1994	Succeeded by Sven Hirdman
Preceded by None	Ambassador of Sweden to Kazakhstan; 1993–1994	Succeeded by Sven Hirdman
Preceded by None	Ambassador of Sweden to Kyrgyzstan; 1993–1994	Succeeded by Sven Hirdman
Preceded by None	Ambassador of Sweden to Tajikistan; 1993–1994	Succeeded by Sven Hirdman
Preceded by None	Ambassador of Sweden to Turkmenistan; 1993–1994	Succeeded by Sven Hirdman
Preceded by None	Ambassador of Sweden to Uzbekistan; 1993–1994	Succeeded by Sven Hirdman
Preceded by Torsten Örn	Ambassador of Sweden to Germany; 1994–1996	Succeeded by Mats Hellström
Preceded by Stig Brattström	Ambassador of Sweden to France; 1996–2001	Succeeded by Frank Belfrage
