= List of ambassadors of Sweden to Kyrgyzstan =

Ambassador of Sweden to Kyrgyzstan
- Lesser coat of arms of the Kingdom of Sweden
- Incumbent; Tomas Danestad since 2023
- Ministry for Foreign Affairs
- Style: His or Her Excellency (formal); Mr. or Madam Ambassador (informal)
- Reports to: Minister for Foreign Affairs
- Seat: Stockholm, Sweden
- Appointer: Government of Sweden
- Term length: No fixed term
- Inaugural holder: Örjan Berner
- Formation: 1993

The Ambassador of Sweden to Kyrgyzstan (known formally as the Ambassador of the Kingdom of Sweden to the Kyrgyz Republic) is the official representative of the government of Sweden to the president of Kyrgyzstan and government of Kyrgyzstan. Since Sweden does not have an embassy in Bishkek, Sweden's ambassador to Kyrgyzstan is based in Stockholm, Sweden.

== History ==
On 16 January 1992, the Swedish government recognized the Kyrgyz Republic as an independent state. On 19 March 1992, the Swedish government decided to establish diplomatic relations with Kyrgyzstan. The agreement came into effect on 25 March 1992, when it was signed in Helsinki by Foreign Minister Margaretha af Ugglas on behalf of Sweden and Muratbek Imanalive on behalf of Kyrgyzstan. The following year, Sweden's ambassador in Moscow was also accredited to Kyrgyzstan. From 2004 onward, a Stockholm-based ambassador-at-large was appointed, who in addition to Kyrgyzstan is also ambassador to other Central Asian countries.

== List of representatives ==
Name	Period	Title	Notes	Presented credentials	Ref
Örjan Berner	1993–1994	Ambassador	Resident in Moscow.		
Sven Hirdman	1994–2004	Ambassador	Resident in Moscow.		
Hans Olsson	2004–2012	Ambassador	Resident in Stockholm.		
Åke Peterson	30 August 2012 – 2015	Ambassador	Resident in Stockholm		
Christian Kamill	2015–2020	Ambassador	Resident in Astana (Note: Kamill was ambassador to Astana until 2017 when he was succeeded by Mats Foyer. It is unclear whether he continued to reside in Astana after that. He was ambassador to Kyrgyzstan until 2020 when he was appointed Sweden's ambassador to Baku.)	30 March 2016	
Christian Kamill	2020–2022	Ambassador	Resident in Baku		
Tomas Danestad	2023–present	Ambassador	Resident in Stockholm	28 March 2023	
