= Yvonne Hirdman =

Swedish historian and gender researcher (born 1943)

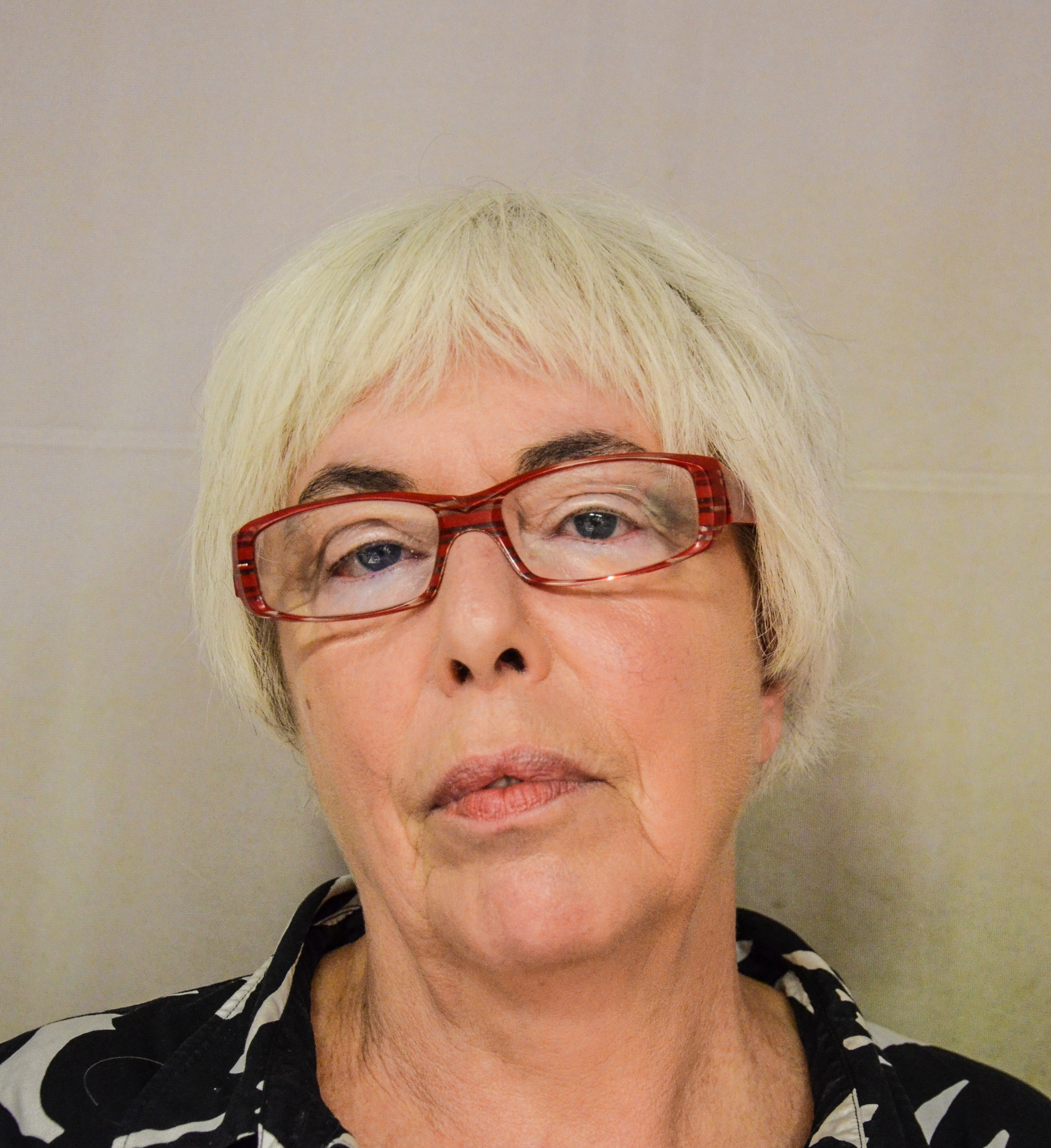
Yvonne Hirdman (2012)

Yvonne Hirdman (born 18 January 1943) is a Swedish historian and gender researcher. She has received many awards for her work including the August Prize.

== Early years and education ==
Yvonne Hirdman is the daughter of the language teacher Einar Hirdman (1916–1999) and Charlotte Hirdman, born Schledt (1906–1966), and granddaughter of Gunnar and Maj Hirdman. She is the mother of Anja Hirdman and sister of Sven Hirdman. She grew up in Hökarängen, Malmberget. and Oskarshamn. She received a bachelor's degree in 1968 and PhD in 1974 at Stockholm University with the thesis of Sveriges Kommunistiska Parti 1939–1945 ("Swedish Communist Party 1939–1945").

== Career ==
She has, among other things, conducted gender-oriented research and is particularly known for having in Sweden launched the concept of "genus". Her theories came first to have an impact on the state power investigation, where she was one of the members. She has been a professor of history at the University of Gothenburg, working at the Institute for Working Life; professor of contemporary history at Södertörn University; and professor of history at Stockholm University, where, as of 2017, she is professor emerita in the history department.

The concept of gender became helpful when talking about the "female" or the "male" in a context of cultural and social rather than biological. In 1988, Hirdman published a report at the University of Gothenburg in book form entitled: The Genus System: theoretical considerations about women's social subordination, the Power Investigation. It was in this report that Hirdman wrote about the concept of gender in its importance in the Swedish language and then the concept was launched in the Swedish language. In 2004 she wrote a book by the title: The Genus System - Reflections on Women's Social Subordination. In 2001, Hirdman published her first edition of the book Genus, about the changing forms of stability. A newer edition was published in 2003 with the same title.

In 2015, her autobiography was published, Medan jag var ung ("While I was young").

== Selected works ==
- Sveriges kommunistiska parti 1939–1945. Sverige under andra världskriget. Stockholm: Allmänna förl. 1974. Libris 7257729
- Vi bygger landet: den svenska arbetarrörelsens historia från Per Götrek till Olof Palme. Solna: Pogo press. 1979. Libris 7639436
- Mat som vetenskap, utopi och ideologi. 1980. Libris 3172972
- Magfrågan: mat som mål och medel : Stockholm 1870–1920. Tema nova. Stockholm: Rabén & Sjögren. 1983. Libris 8349157
- Olof Petersson och Yvonne Hirdman (1985). Två föredrag om maktutredningen: TAMs, TBVs och TCOs tematräff om den politiska makten och folkstyret den 5 December 1985. Uppsala: Maktutredningen. Libris 556019
- Om makt. Uppsala: Maktutredningen. 1986. Libris 556040
- Genussystemet: teoretiska funderingar kring kvinnors sociala underordning. Uppsala: Maktutredningen. 1988. Libris 753181
- Att lägga livet till rätta: studier i svensk folkhemspolitik. Stockholm: Carlsson. 1989. Libris 7665869
- The gender system: theoretical reflections on the social subordination of women. Uppsala: Maktutredningen. 1990. Libris 883049
- Den socialistiska hemmafrun och andra kvinnohistorier. Stockholm: Carlsson. 1992. Libris 8376656
- Utopia in the home: an essay. International journal of political economy; Vol. 22:2. Armonk, N.Y.: Sharpe. 1992. Libris 12000263
- Folkhemstanken och kvinnorna: historiens andra sida. Samtal om rättvisa, 1103-2146; 9. Stockholm: Brevskolan. 1993. Libris 7431356
- Narratives of subordination?. Reprint - Institutet för arbetslivsforskning, 1400-2027:19. Stockholm: Institutet för arbetslivsforskning. 1994. Libris 1975578
- Social engineering and the woman question: Sweden in the thirties. Reprint - Institutet för arbetslivsforskning, 1400-2027:7. Stockholm: Institutet för arbetslivsforskning. 1994. Libris 1956049
- Women - from possibility to problem?: gender conflict in the welfare state - the Swedish model. Research report series / Arbetslivscentrum, 1103-2499:3. Stockholm: Arbetslivscentrum. 1994. Libris 1777349
- Genusanalys av välfärdsstaten: en utmaning av dikotomierna. Reprint - Institutet för arbetslivsforskning, 1400-2027:5. Stockholm: Institutet för arbetslivsforskning. 1994. Libris 1947234
- Påminnelser: om kvinnors liv i Sverige. Stockholm: Carlsson. 1995. Libris 7666498
- Med kluven tunga: LO och genusordningen. Stockholm: Atlas. 1998. Libris 7777514
- Genus: om det stabilas föränderliga former. Malmö: Liber. 2001. Libris 8354469
- Key concepts in feminist theory: analysing gender and welfare. Freia 0907-2179 34. Aalborg: Freia, Feminist Research Centre in Aalborg, Department of Development and Planning, Aalborg University. 2001. Libris 8954150
- Det tänkande hjärtat: boken om Alva Myrdal. Stockholm: Ordfront. 2006. Libris 10141468
- Gösta och genusordningen: feministiska betraktelser. Stockholm: Ordfront. 2007. Libris 10425277
- Den röda grevinnan: en europeisk historia. Stockholm: Ordfront. 2010. Libris 11744243
- Vad bör göras? : jämställdhet och politik under femtio år. Stockholm: Ordfront. 2014. Libris 15122351
- Medan jag var ung : ego-historia från 1900-talet. Stockholm: Ordfront. 2015. Libris 17048945

== Awards ==
- 2003 – Årets väckarklocka
- 2005 – Kellgrenpriset
- 2010 – Hertig Karls prize
- 2010 – August Prize
- 2016 – Moa Award
