= Sven Hirdman =

Swedish diplomat (1939–2026)

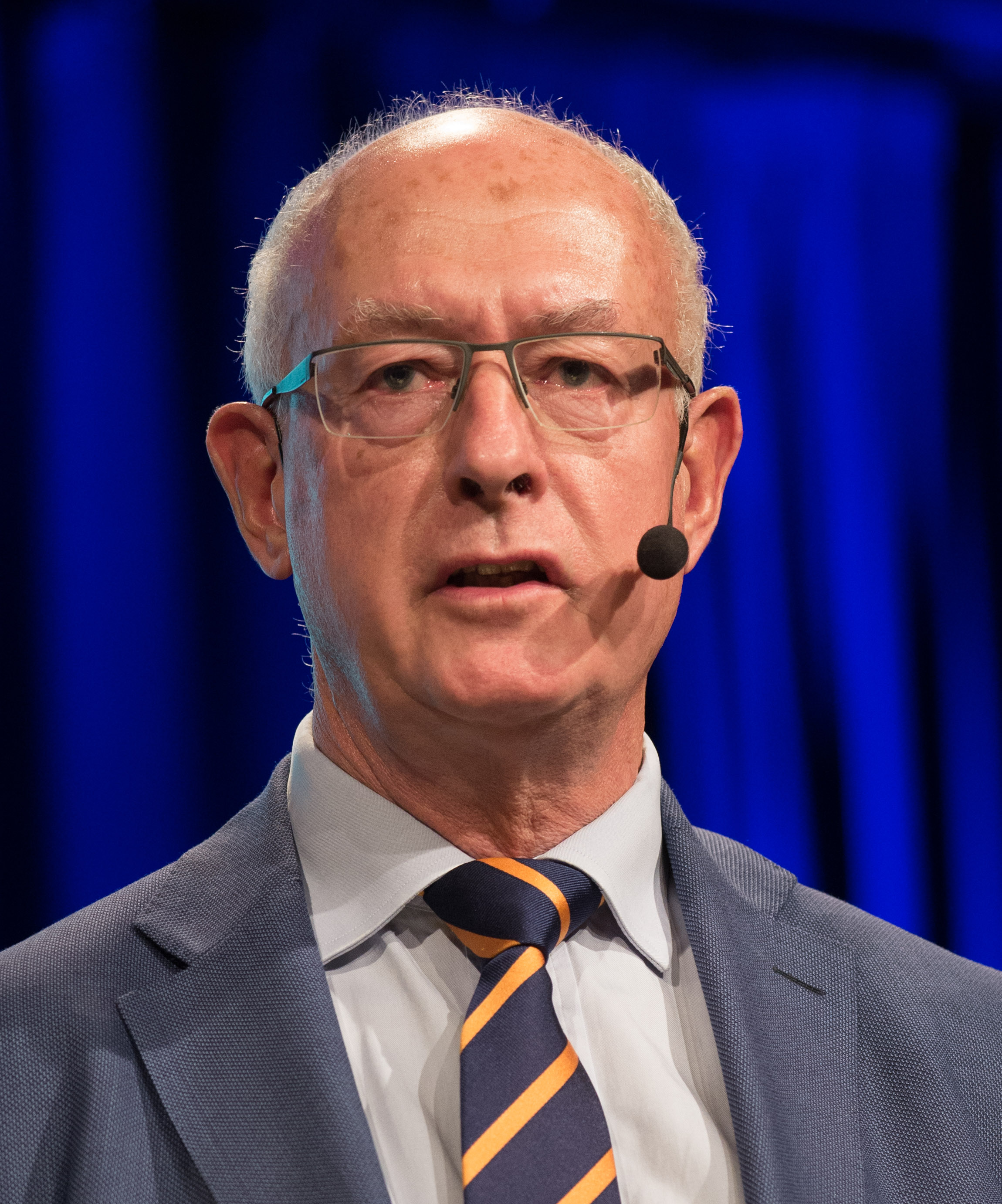
- Hirdman in 2015
- Born: Henrik Sven Hirdman; 28 September 1939; Stavanger, Norway
- Died: 9 October 2026 (aged 87)
- Education: Uppsala University
- Occupation: Diplomat
- Years active: 1963–2004
- Spouse: Marianne Ljungqvist (m. 1959)
- Children: 3

Henrik Sven Hirdman (Swedish pronunciation: [hẹn:rik sveːn hiːrdmaːn]; 28 September 1939 – 9 October 2026) was a Swedish diplomat.

== Early life ==
Hirdman was born on 28 September 1939 in Stavanger, Norway, the son of Einar Hirdman (1916–1999), a lector, and his wife Charlotte Schledt (1906–1966), a language teacher and interpreter. Hirdman's grandparents on the mother's side were the Swiss Emélie and the German Fritz Schledt, and Swedish Gunnar and Maj Hirdman on the father's side. Eili and Yvonne Hirdman are sisters to Sven Hirdman. In August 2010 Yvonne Hirdman published a prized book entitled Den röda grevinnan (The Red Countess) about their mother Charlotte.

After military service at the Swedish Army Language School in 1958, Sven Hirdman went to Uppsala University for studies in Slavic languages and a Master of Social Sciences, with international relations as the major field of study. He received a Master of Social Science degree from Uppsala University in 1963.

== Career ==
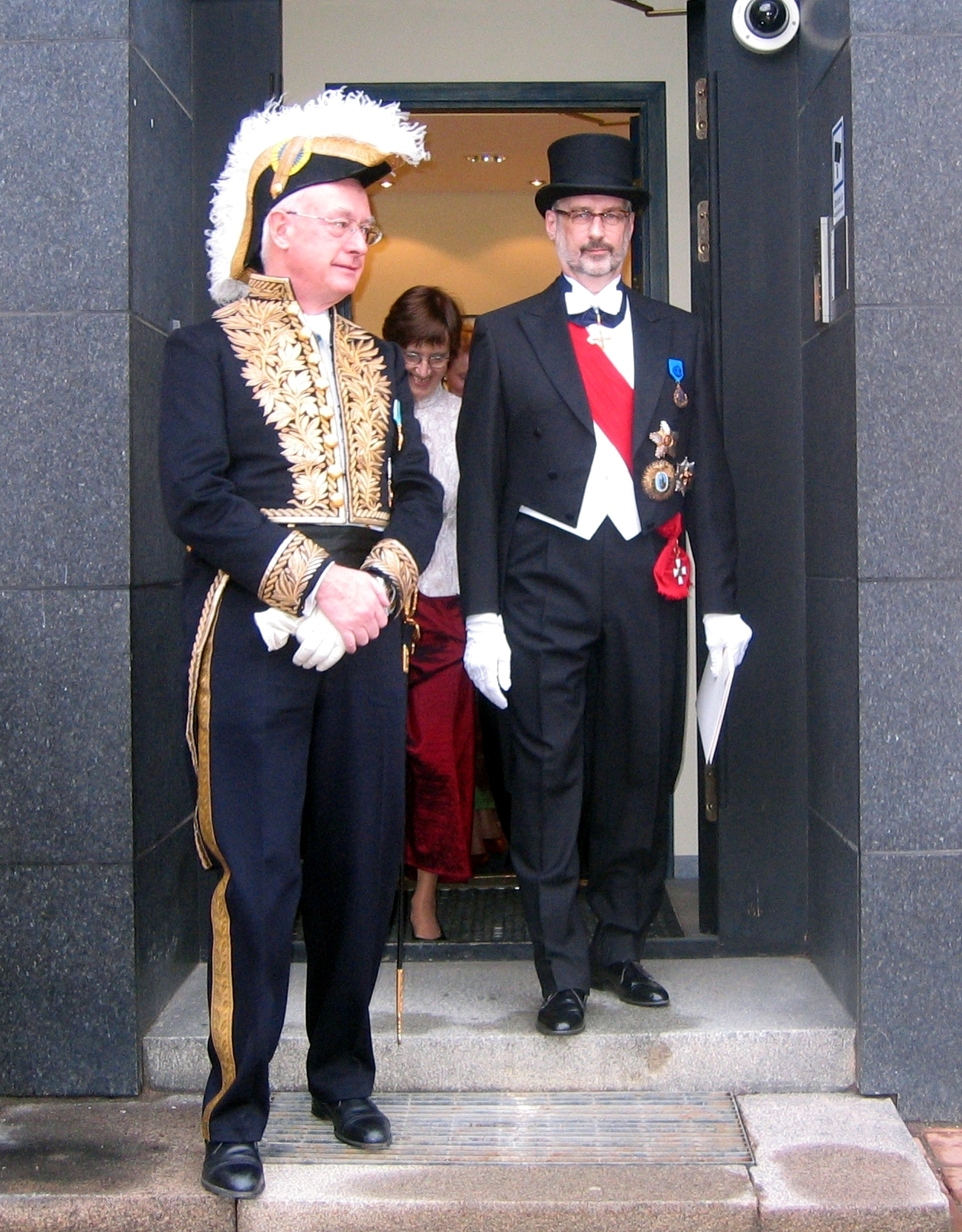
Swedish diplomat Sven Hirdman in diplomatic uniform with ambassador Jaak Jõerüüt of Estonia in white tie, and top hat (2011).

In the years 1963–1994, Sven Hirdman served in the Ministry for Foreign Affairs. He served as ambassador in Moscow and Tel Aviv and earlier as embassy official in London and Beijing.

In time chronology, Hirdman was deputy director of the Stockholm International Peace Research Institute (SIPRI) from 1969 until 1972; Embassy Counsellor in Beijing from 1972 to 1976; Head of Division in the Ministry of Foreign Affairs from 1976 to 1979; State Secretary in the Ministry of Defence from 1979 to 1982; Ambassador in Tel Aviv and Nicosia from 1983 to 1987; War Materials Inspector and head of the National Swedish War Materials Inspectorate from 1987 to 1994. Between 1994 and 2004 he was Sweden's Ambassador in Moscow, and in the four last years also the Dean (Doyen) of the Diplomatic Corps there. During his service in Moscow Hirdman was simultaneously accredited as ambassador to Belarus, Georgia, Armenia, Azerbaijan, Kazakhstan, Kyrgyzstan, Uzbekistan, Tajikistan and Turkmenistan.

Hirdman was part of the Swedish chapter of Transparency International between the years 2008 and 2009 chairman, and between the years 2005 and 2011 Marshal of the Diplomatic Corps at the Foreign Ministry. Since 1990 he was member of the Royal Swedish Academy of War Sciences. He has also had assignments for industry.

As an active participant in the security policy debate in Sweden Sven Hirdman was often engaged as a lecturer around the country. He was against Swedish membership in NATO, and published in October 2015 the book Ryssland och svensk säkerhetspolitik - 50 år i utrikespolitisk tjänst (Russia and Swedish Security Policy - 50 years in foreign policy service).

== Personal life and death ==
In 1959, Hirdman married Marianne Ljungqvist (born 1938), the daughter of John Ljungqvist and Hanna (née Isberg). They had three daughters: Annika, Viveka, and Tonika.

Hirdman died on 9 October 2026, at the age of 87.

Diplomatic posts
Preceded by Torsten Örn	Ambassador of Sweden to Israel; 1983–1987	Succeeded by Mats Bergquist
Preceded by Torsten Örn	Ambassador of Sweden to Cyprus; 1983–1987	Succeeded by Mats Bergquist
Preceded by Örjan Berner	Ambassador of Sweden to Russia; 1994–2004	Succeeded by Johan Molander
Preceded by Örjan Berner	Ambassador of Sweden to Armenia; 1994–2004	Succeeded by Johan Molander
Preceded by Örjan Berner	Ambassador of Sweden to Azerbaijan; 1994–1997	Succeeded by Michael Sahlin
Preceded by Örjan Berner	Ambassador of Sweden to Belarus; 1994–2004	Succeeded by Johan Molander
Preceded by Örjan Berner	Ambassador of Sweden to Georgia; 1994–2004	Succeeded by Johan Molander
Preceded by Örjan Berner	Ambassador of Sweden to Kazakhstan; 1994–2004	Succeeded by Hans Olsson
Preceded by Örjan Berner	Ambassador of Sweden to Kyrgyzstan; 1994–2004	Succeeded by Hans Olsson
Preceded by Örjan Berner	Ambassador of Sweden to Tajikistan; 1994–2004	Succeeded by Hans Olsson
Preceded by Örjan Berner	Ambassador of Sweden to Turkmenistan; 1994–2004	Succeeded by Hans Olsson
Preceded by Örjan Berner	Ambassador of Sweden to Uzbekistan; 1994–2004	Succeeded by Hans Olsson
