= List of ambassadors of Sweden to Kazakhstan =

Ambassador of Sweden to Kazakhstan
- Lesser coat of arms of the Kingdom of Sweden
- Incumbent; Stefan Eriksson since 2025
- Ministry for Foreign Affairs; Swedish Embassy, Astana
- Style: His or Her Excellency (formal); Mr. or Madam Ambassador (informal)
- Reports to: Minister for Foreign Affairs
- Seat: Astana, Kazakhstan
- Appointer: Government of Sweden
- Term length: No fixed term
- Inaugural holder: Örjan Berner
- Formation: 1993
- Website: Swedish Embassy, Astana

The Ambassador of Sweden to Kazakhstan (known formally as the Ambassador of the Kingdom of Sweden to the Republic of Kazakhstan) is the official representative of the government of Sweden to the president of Kazakhstan and government of Kazakhstan.

== History ==
On 16 January 1992, the Swedish government recognized the Republic of Kazakhstan as an independent state. On 3 April 1992, the Swedish government decided to establish diplomatic relations with Kazakhstan. The agreement came into effect on 7 April 1992, when it was signed in Alma-Ata by Ambassador Örjan Berner on behalf of Sweden and Tulentaj Suleimenov on behalf of Kazakhstan. The following year, Sweden's ambassador in Moscow was also accredited to Kazakhstan. From 2004 onward, a Swedish ambassador based in Stockholm was accredited to Kazakhstan and other Central Asian countries.

On 9 September 2010, the Swedish government decided to open an embassy in Astana later that autumn. The embassy was established as a "mini-embassy," with a chargé d'affaires sharing facilities with staff from Norway and Finland. It officially opened on 1 October 2010. Since February 2013, Sweden has had a resident ambassador in Astana.

== List of representatives ==
Name	Period	Title	Notes	Presented credentials	Ref
Örjan Berner	1993–1994	Ambassador	Resident in Moscow.		
Sven Hirdman	1994–2004	Ambassador	Resident in Moscow.		
Hans Olsson	2004–2012 (Note: It is unclear how long Hans Olsson served as the Stockholm-based ambassador to Kazakhstan. The latest source is dated 28 January 2012. He may have continued as ambassador until Manne Wängborg assumed the role in February 2013.)	Ambassador	Resident in Stockholm.		
Manne Wängborg	November 2010 – February 2013	Chargé d'affaires ad interim			
Manne Wängborg	February 2013 – 2014	Ambassador			
Christian Kamill	2014–2017	Ambassador	Also accredited to Bishkek (from 2015).		
Mats Foyer	19 October 2017 – 2022	Ambassador			
Ewa Polano	November 2022 – 2025	Ambassador		24 January 2023	
Stefan Eriksson	2025–present	Ambassador		29 August 2025	
