= List of ambassadors of Sweden to Tajikistan =

Ambassador of Sweden to Tajikistan
- Lesser coat of arms of the Kingdom of Sweden
- Incumbent; Tomas Danestad since 2022
- Ministry for Foreign Affairs
- Style: His or Her Excellency (formal); Mr. or Madam Ambassador (informal)
- Reports to: Minister for Foreign Affairs
- Seat: Stockholm, Sweden
- Appointer: Government of Sweden
- Term length: No fixed term
- Inaugural holder: Örjan Berner
- Formation: 1993

The Ambassador of Sweden to Tajikistan (known formally as the Ambassador of the Kingdom of Sweden to the Republic of Tajikistan) is the official representative of the government of Sweden to the president of Tajikistan and government of Tajikistan. Since Sweden does not have an embassy in Dushanbe, Sweden's ambassador to Tajikistan is based in Stockholm, Sweden.

== History ==
On 16 January 1992, the Swedish government recognized Tajikistan as an independent state. On 26 November 1992, the Swedish government decided to establish diplomatic relations with Tajikistan. The agreement came into effect on 9 December 1992, when it was signed in Moscow by Ambassador Örjan Berner on behalf of Sweden and Jamshed Karimov on behalf of Tajikistan. The following year, Sweden's ambassador in Moscow was also accredited to Tajikistan. From 2004 onward, a Stockholm-based ambassador-at-large was appointed, who in addition to Tajikistan is also ambassador to other Central Asian countries.

== List of representatives ==
Name	Period	Title	Notes	Presented credentials	Ref
Örjan Berner	1993–1994	Ambassador	Resident in Moscow		
Sven Hirdman	1994–2004	Ambassador	Resident in Moscow		
Hans Olsson	2004–2012	Ambassador	Resident in Stockholm		
Åke Peterson	February 2013 – 2015	Ambassador	Resident in Stockholm		
Ingrid Tersman	September 2015 – 2022	Ambassador	Resident in Stockholm	11 March 2016	
Tomas Danestad	2022–present	Ambassador	Resident in Stockholm	19 November 2022	
