= Lars Fredén =

Swedish diplomat (born 1951)

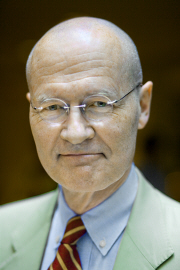
Lars Fredén.

Lars Peter Fredén (born 9 August 1951) is a Swedish diplomat who has held several ambassadorships during his career.

== Career ==
Working in the Swedish Foreign Service since 1982, Fredén was Ambassador to China and Mongolia from 2010 to 2016. Previous ambassadorships have taken him to Zagreb, Skopje, Pristina and Tirana. From 2003 to 2006, Fredén was the Head of the International Affairs Department at the European Space Agency in Paris. He was also the Security Policy Aid to the Prime Minister (1992–1994) and Deputy Chief of Mission in Moscow (1995–1998).

He studied at Shandong University, Peking University, and Harvard.

Diplomatic posts
Preceded by Sture Theolin	Ambassador of Sweden to Croatia; 2006–2008	Succeeded by Fredrik Vahlquist
Preceded by Ulrika Cronenberg-Mossberg	Ambassador of Sweden to the former Yugoslav Republic of Macedonia; 2008–2010	Succeeded by Lars Wahlund
Preceded by Ulrika Cronenberg-Mossberg	Ambassador of Sweden to Kosovo; 2008–2010	Succeeded by Lars Wahlund
Preceded by Anders Bjurner	Ambassador of Sweden to Albania; 2008–2010	Succeeded by Lars Wahlund
Preceded by Mikael Lindström	Ambassador of Sweden to China; 2010–2016	Succeeded by Anna Lindstedt
Preceded by Mikael Lindström	Ambassador of Sweden to Mongolia; 2010–2016	Succeeded by Anna Lindstedt
