= List of ambassadors of Sweden to Belarus =

Ambassador of Sweden to Belarus
- Lesser coat of arms of the Kingdom of Sweden
- Incumbent; Lars-Gunnar Wigemark as Chargé d'affaires ad interim since October 2025
- Ministry for Foreign Affairs; Swedish Embassy, Minsk
- Style: His or Her Excellency (formal); Mr. or Madam Ambassador (informal)
- Reports to: Minister for Foreign Affairs
- Seat: Minsk, Belarus
- Appointer: Government of Sweden
- Term length: No fixed term
- Inaugural holder: Örjan Berner
- Formation: 1992
- Website: Swedish Embassy, Minsk

The Ambassador of Sweden to Belarus (known formally as the Ambassador of the Kingdom of Sweden to the Republic of Belarus) is the official representative of the government of Sweden to the president of Belarus and government of Belarus.

== History ==
On 19 December 1991, the Swedish government recognized the Republic of Belarus. On 9 January 1992, the Swedish government decided to enter into an agreement with Belarus to establish diplomatic relations. The agreement entered into force on 14 January 1992, upon its signing in Minsk by Sweden's Minister for Foreign Affairs, Margaretha af Ugglas on behalf of Sweden, and Belarus' Minister for Foreign Affairs Piatro Kravchanka on behalf of Belarus. That same year, Sweden's ambassador in Moscow, Örjan Berner, was also accredited as ambassador to Belarus.

In 2000, Sweden opened an honorary consulate in Minsk. In November 2003, Sweden expanded its presence by opening an embassy office, which was part of the Embassy of Sweden in Moscow. The embassy office was operated by a single Swedish diplomat. In December 2007, the Swedish government decided to elevate the embassy office to a full embassy, a transition that was officially completed in 2008. The embassy was temporarily closed from August 2012 to July 2013 and reopened in 2014.

≈==List of representatives==

Name	Period	Title	Resident / Concurrent accreditation	Notes	Presented credentials	Ref
Örjan Berner	1992–1994	Ambassador	Resident in Moscow			
Sven Hirdman	1994–2004	Ambassador	Resident in Moscow			
Johan Molander	2004–2008	Ambassador	Resident in Moscow			
Stefan Eriksson	2008 – 3 August 2012	Ambassador		Declared persona non grata. (Note: The announcement that Stefan Eriksson was declared persona non grata came a month after the Teddybear Airdrop Minsk incident, during which the Swedish PR agency Studio Total dropped teddy bears carrying regime-critical messages over Belarus. However, this was reportedly "not at all" mentioned in connection with the decision to expel the ambassador, according to Swedish Foreign Minister Carl Bildt.)		
Embassy was closed between August 2012 and July 2013
Martin Åberg	July 2013 – April 2015	Chargé d'affaires ad interim				
Martin Åberg	April 2015 – 2017	Ambassador			25 June 2015	
Christina Johannesson	1 September 2017 – 2022	Ambassador				
Eva Sundquist	September 2022 – January 2024	Chargé d'affaires				
Hannes Tordengren	January 2024 – October 2025	Chargé d'affaires ad interim				
Lars-Gunnar Wigemark	October 2025 – present	Chargé d'affaires ad interim				
