= List of ambassadors of Sweden to the Holy See =

Ambassador of Sweden to the Holy See
- Lesser coat of arms of the Kingdom of Sweden
- Incumbent; Per Holmström since 2023
- Ministry for Foreign Affairs
- Style: His or Her Excellency (formal); Mr. or Madam Ambassador (informal)
- Reports to: Minister for Foreign Affairs
- Seat: Stockholm, Sweden (Note: The Swedish ambassador to the Holy See is based in Stockholm, Sweden.)
- Appointer: Government of Sweden
- Term length: No fixed term
- Inaugural holder: Gunnar Ljungdahl
- Formation: 1983
- Website: Swedish Embassy, Holy See

The Ambassador of Sweden to the Holy See (known formally as the Ambassador of the Kingdom of Sweden to the Holy See) is the official representative of the government of Sweden to the Holy See, the leadership of the Catholic Church. The official representation began with the formal opening of diplomatic relations between Sweden and the Holy See in 1982. Sweden accredited its first ambassador to the Holy See in 1983. The ambassador is resident in Stockholm, Sweden.

== History ==
Diplomatic relations between Sweden and the Holy See were severed at the Riksdag of 1527 in Västerås under Gustav Vasa, who carried out the Reformation and became Sweden's first Protestant king.

After more than 450 years, diplomatic relations were re-established through an exchange of notes conducted in Stockholm and Rome on 30 June, 12 July, and 26 July 1982. Sweden and the Holy See agreed to establish diplomatic relations with effect from 2 August 1982.

On 24 March 1983, Ambassador Gunnar Ljungdahl, Sweden's first ambassador to the Holy See, presented his credentials to Pope John Paul II. During the initial years, the ambassador was resident in Stockholm. From 1988 to 2001, the ambassador was resident in Rome, and since 2001 the ambassador has once again been resident in Stockholm.

Over the years, the ambassador to the Holy See has also been accredited as Sweden's ambassador to Malta (1987–1992, 2008–present) and San Marino (1989–2005).

== List of representatives ==
Name	Period	Resident/Non resident	Title	Notes	Presented credentials	Ref
Gunnar Ljungdahl	1983–1986	Non-resident	Ambassador		24 March 1983	
Bengt Friedman	1986–1988	Non-resident	Ambassador	Also accredited to Valetta (from 1987).		
Lars Bergquist	1988–1993	Resident	Ambassador	Also accredited to the City of San Marino (from 1989) and Valetta (1989–1992).	December 1988	
Tom Tscherning	1993–1994	Resident	Ambassador	Also accredited to the City of San Marino.		
Torsten Örn	1994–1996	Resident	Ambassador	Also accredited to the City of San Marino.	November 1994	
Anders Thunborg	1996–1999	Resident	Ambassador	Also accredited to the City of San Marino.		
Bo Henrikson	1999–2001	Resident	Ambassador	Also accredited to the City of San Marino.	20 December 1999	
Fredrik Vahlquist	2001–2007	Non-resident	Ambassador	Also accredited to the City of San Marino (2003–2005).		
Ulla Gudmundson	2008–2013	Non-resident	Ambassador	Also accredited to Valetta.		
Lars-Hjalmar Wide	2013–2016	Non-resident	Ambassador	Also accredited to Valetta.		
Cecilia Björner	September 2016 – 2021	Non-resident	Ambassador	Also accredited to Valetta.		
Andrés Jato	2021 – August 2023	Non-resident	Ambassador	Also accredited to Valetta.		
Per Holmström	2023–present	Non-resident	Ambassador	Also accredited to Valetta.		
