= Karin Olofsdotter (diplomat) =

Swedish diplomat (born 1966)

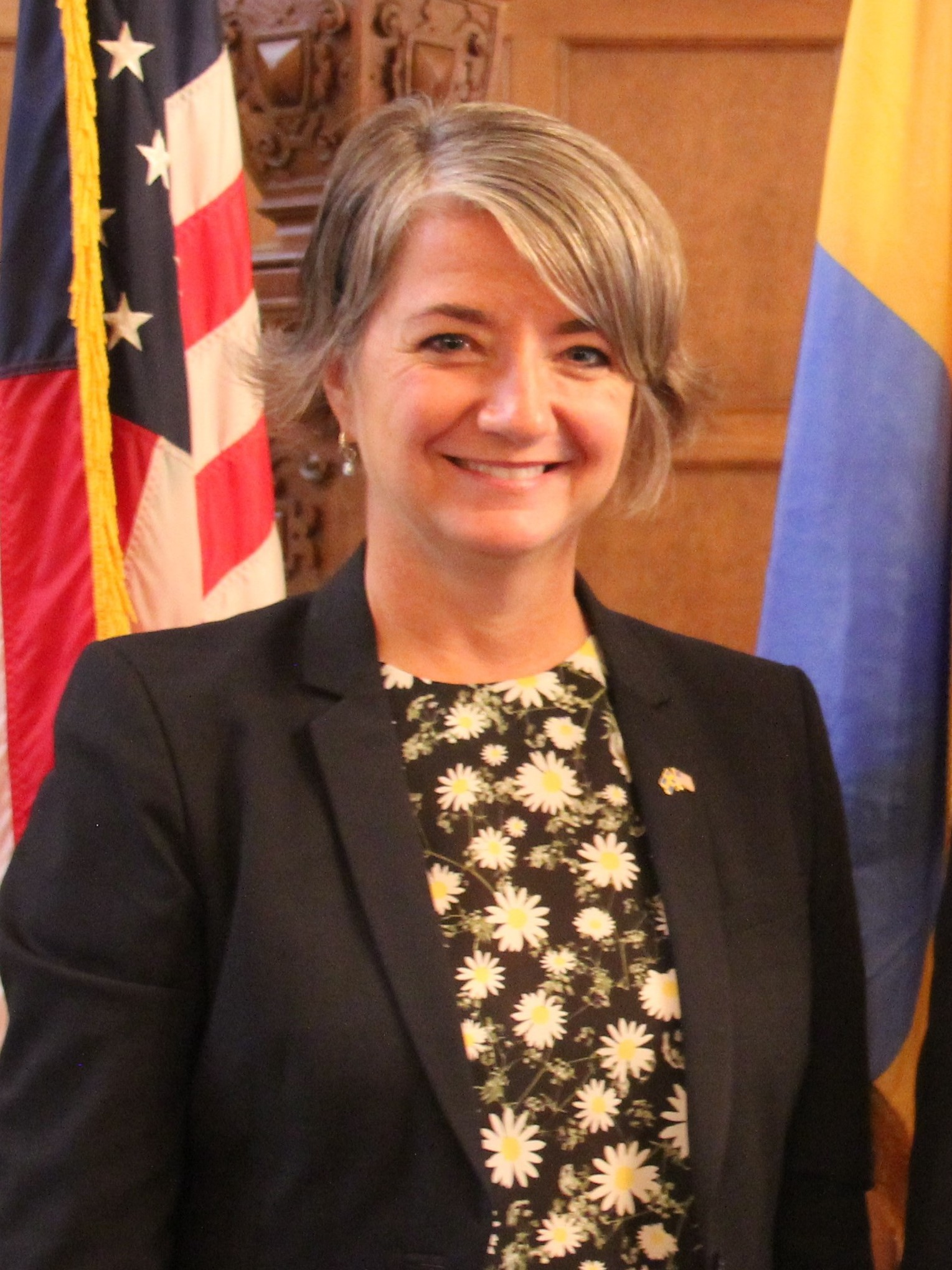
- Olofsdotter in 2018

Ambassador of Sweden to Russia
- In office 15 August 2023 – 2025
- Preceded by: Malena Mård
- Succeeded by: Christina Johannesson

Ambassador of Sweden to the United States
- In office 2017 – 14 August 2023
- Preceded by: Björn Lyrvall
- Succeeded by: Urban Ahlin

Ambassador of Sweden to Hungary
- In office 2011–2014
- Preceded by: Cecilia Björner
- Succeeded by: Niclas Trouvé

Personal details
- Born: 16 June 1966 (age 60) Sweden
- Parent(s): Olle and Eivor Svensson
- Education: Lund University (BA, 1994); University of California, Los Angeles

Karin Ulrika Olofsdotter (born 16 June 1966) is a Swedish diplomat and Swedish Ambassador to the Russian Federation. She was Swedish Ambassador to the United States from 2017 to 2023. She started her role as Ambassador of Sweden to the United States on 1 September 2017.

== Career ==
Karin Olofsdotter entered the Foreign Service in 1994, and served as Chief of Staff to several Swedish Foreign Ministers and as Director of the Ministers Office in Stockholm before joining the Embassy in Washington.

Before her assignment to Washington, D.C., Olofsdotter served as Director-General for Trade at the Ministry for Foreign Affairs in Sweden from 1 September 2016. Olofsdotter has also held the position of Deputy Director-General and Head of the Department for Promotion of Sweden, Trade and CSR in Stockholm in the two years prior.

From 2011 to August 2014, Olofsdotter was Swedish Ambassador to Hungary. While in Hungary, on 9 September 2012, Olofsdotter attend the "dedication ceremony yesterday of the Raoul Wallenberg Memorial Park, which was held in the courtyard of the Dohany Street Synagogue in Budapest". From 2008 and 2011, Olofsdotter was Deputy Chief of Mission in Washington, D.C.

She has also served at the Swedish EU Representation in Brussels, Belgium, working with European security policy and defense issues. She chaired the EU's Political-Military Group during the Swedish Presidency of the EU in 2001. Prior to this she worked at the Swedish delegation to NATO. Her first posting was in Moscow, Russia, where she was mainly responsible for covering Belarus.

As a part of diplomatic outreach, Olofsdotter, with Karl-Theodor zu Guttenberg was part of a town hall style meeting in Peters Township, south of Pittsburgh, Pennsylvania.

Ambassador Olofsdotter has a B.A. in psychology, economics and Russian. She studied at the UCLA Anderson School of Management and speaks Swedish, Russian, French and English.

== Media ==
On 22 July 2024, she acted as Sommar host.

== Publications ==
- Sweden refused to impose a coronavirus lockdown. The country's ambassador explains why, Los Angeles Times, 2020

== Honours ==
- (Sweden) H. M. The King's Medal, 12th size, worn on the ribbon of the Order of the Seraphim (6 June 2026)

Diplomatic posts
| Preceded by Cecilia Björner | Ambassador of Sweden to Hungary; 2011–2014 | Succeeded by Niclas Trouvé |
| Preceded by Björn Lyrvall | Ambassador of Sweden to the United States; 2017–2023 | Succeeded by Urban Ahlin |
| Preceded by Malena Mård | Ambassador of Sweden to Russia; 2023–2025 | Succeeded by Christina Johannesson |
