= List of ambassadors of Sweden to Croatia =

Ambassador of Sweden to Croatia
- Lesser coat of arms of the Kingdom of Sweden
- Incumbent; Anna Boda since August 2023
- Ministry for Foreign Affairs; Swedish Embassy, Zagreb
- Style: His or Her Excellency (formal); Mr. or Madam Ambassador (informal)
- Reports to: Minister for Foreign Affairs
- Seat: Zagreb, Croatia
- Appointer: Government of Sweden
- Term length: No fixed term
- Inaugural holder: Sune Danielsson
- Formation: 1992
- Website: Swedish Embassy, Zagreb

The Ambassador of Sweden to Croatia (known formally as the Ambassador of the Kingdom of Sweden to the Republic of Croatia) is the official representative of the government of Sweden to the president of Croatia and government of Croatia.

== History ==
Sweden recognized Croatia on 16 January 1992, following its independence from the Socialist Federal Republic of Yugoslavia. On 23 January 1992, the Swedish government decided to establish diplomatic relations with Croatia. The agreement came into effect on 29 January 1992. Sweden opened an embassy in Zagreb on 9 March 1992. Initially, the embassy was headed by a chargé d'affaires. An ambassador was appointed later that year.

== List of representatives ==
Name	Period	Title	Notes	Presented credentials	Ref
Eva-Christine Bergström	1992–1992	Chargé d'affaires			
Sune Danielsson	1992–1997	Ambassador			
Ingemar Börjesson	1997–2001	Ambassador			
Sture Theolin	2001–2006	Ambassador			
Lars Fredén	2006–2008	Ambassador			
Fredrik Vahlquist	2008–2013	Ambassador			
Lars Schmidt	September 2013 – August 2018	Ambassador			
Diana Madunic	1 September 2018 – 2023	Ambassador		7 September 2018	
Anna Boda	August 2023 – present	Ambassador		28 September 2023	

== See also ==
- Croatia–Sweden relations
