= List of ambassadors of Sweden to Turkmenistan =

Ambassador of Sweden to Turkmenistan
- Lesser coat of arms of the Kingdom of Sweden
- Incumbent; Tomas Danestad since 2022
- Ministry for Foreign Affairs
- Style: His or Her Excellency (formal); Mr. or Madam Ambassador (informal)
- Reports to: Minister for Foreign Affairs
- Seat: Stockholm, Sweden
- Appointer: Government of Sweden
- Term length: No fixed term
- Inaugural holder: Örjan Berner
- Formation: 1993

The Ambassador of Sweden to Turkmenistan (known formally as the Ambassador of the Kingdom of Sweden to Turkmenistan) is the official representative of the government of Sweden to the president of Turkmenistan and government of Turkmenistan. Since Sweden does not have an embassy in Ashgabat, Sweden's ambassador to Turkmenistan is based in Stockholm, Sweden.

== History ==
On 16 January 1992, the Swedish government recognized Turkmenistan as an independent state. On 9 April 1992, the Swedish government decided to establish diplomatic relations with Turkmenistan. The agreement came into effect on 10 April 1992, when it was signed in Ashgabat by Ambassador Örjan Berner on behalf of Sweden and Adby Kuliv on behalf of Turkmenistan. The following year, Sweden's ambassador in Moscow was also accredited to Turkmenistan. From 2004 onward, a Stockholm-based ambassador-at-large was appointed, who in addition to Turkmenistan is also ambassador to other Central Asian countries.

== List of representatives ==
Name	Period	Title	Notes	Presented credentials	Ref
Örjan Berner	1993–1994	Ambassador	Resident in Moscow		
Sven Hirdman	1994–2004	Ambassador	Resident in Moscow		
Hans Olsson	2004–2012	Ambassador	Resident in Stockholm		
Åke Peterson	30 August 2012 – 2015	Ambassador	Resident in Stockholm	22 November 2012	
Ingrid Tersman	September 2015 – 2022	Ambassador	Resident in Stockholm	26 October 2015	
Tomas Danestad	2022–present	Ambassador	Resident in Stockholm	16 February 2023	
