= Anders Thunborg =

Swedish diplomat and politician (1934–2004)

Minister for Defence
- In office 17 January 1983 – 14 October 1985
- Prime Minister: Olof Palme
- Preceded by: Börje Andersson
- Succeeded by: Roine Carlsson

Personal details
- Born: Anders Ingemar Thunborg; 9 June 1934 Stockholm, Sweden
- Died: 3 December 2004 (aged 70) Stockholm, Sweden
- Party: Swedish Social Democratic Party
- Spouse: Ingalill Holm
- Occupation: Diplomat

Anders Ingemar Thunborg (9 June 1934 – 3 December 2004) was a Swedish social democratic politician and diplomat. He served as the defence minister between 1983 and 1985. He was also Swedish ambassador to the United Nations, Moscow, Washington and the Vatican City. He was one of the senior experts on Nordic security.

== Early life ==
Thunborg was born on 9 June 1934 in Stockholm, Sweden, the son of municipal worker Albert Thunborg and school janitor Greta (née Lundin). He graduated from secondary school in 1954 and pursued university studies from 1954 to 1958. In the 1950s, he was a motorcycle racermotorcycle racer and worked as a youth secretary at the International Abstaining Motorists' Association (Motorförarnas Helnykterhetsförbund) from 1956 to 1958. He later served as chairman of the Swedish Motorcycle Association (Svenska motorcykelförbundet) from 1969 to 1976.

== Career ==
Thunborg began his career as secretary of the Planning Committee of the Health and Social Services (Socialvårdens planeringskommitté) in 1958, served as ombudsman of the Stockholm Labour Union from 1958 to 1960, secretary of the Social Democratic Party Executive from 1961 to 1969, and state secretary at the Ministry of Defence from 1969 to 1974. He was chair of the 1974 Defence Inquiry before joining the Ministry for Foreign Affairs later that year.

Thunborg then served as the Permanent Representative of Sweden to the United Nations between 1977 and 1983. During this time, he served as chair of the United Nations Trust Fund for South Africa from 1977 to 1983, was a member of the UN Study Group on Nuclear Weapons from 1979 to 1980, and vice president of the United Nations General Assembly from 1981 to 1982.

In 1983, Thunborg was appointed minister of defence to the second cabinet of Olof Palme. Thunborg replaced Börje Andersson who resigned from the post on 2 December 1983. Thunborg resigned from office in 1985. The reason for his resignation was the remarks by Foreign Minister Lennart Bodström about the Swedish military force.

Thunborg's next post was ambassador to the Soviet Union which he served between 1986 and 1989. Then he was appointed Swedish ambassador to the United States and was in office until 25 January 1993 when he was replaced by Henrik Liljegren in the post. He served as the Swedish ambassador to the Vatican City State in 1996. Next Thunborg was named as the Swedish ambassador to Greece in 1997. It was his last diplomatic post which he could hold just for a short period because of his asthma problems.

In addition to his diplomatic service Thunborg was the chairman of the Swedish Motorcycle Association. He published several articles in Finnish international relations magazine Ulkopolitiikka.

== Personal life and death ==
Thunborg was married to Ingalill Holm (born 1934), the daughter of the merchant John Holm and Signe (née Glaes).

Thunborg died on 3 December 2004 in Stockholm. He was interred on 16 June 2005 at Galärvarvskyrkogården in Stockholm.

Government offices
| Preceded by Börje Andersson | Minister for Defence; 1983–1985 | Succeeded by Roine Carlsson |
Diplomatic posts
| Preceded by Olof Rydbeck | Permanent Representative of Sweden to the United Nations; 1977–1983 | Succeeded by Anders Ferm |
| Preceded by Torsten Örn | Ambassador of Sweden to Russia; 1986–1989 | Succeeded by Örjan Berner |
| Preceded by Torsten Örn | Ambassador of Sweden to Mongolia; 1986–1989 | Succeeded by Örjan Berner |
| Preceded by Wilhelm Wachtmeister | Ambassador of Sweden to the United States; 1989–1993 | Succeeded by Henrik Liljegren |
| Preceded by Karl-Anders Wollter | Ambassador of Sweden to Greece; 1993–1993 | Succeeded by Krister Kumlin |
| Preceded by Torsten Örn | Ambassador of Sweden to the Holy See; 1996–1999 | Succeeded by Bo Henrikson |
