= List of ambassadors of Sweden to Albania =

Ambassador of Sweden to Albania
- Lesser coat of arms of the Kingdom of Sweden
- Incumbent; Niklas Ström since August 2023
- Ministry for Foreign Affairs; Swedish Embassy, Tirana
- Style: His or Her Excellency (formal); Mr. or Madam Ambassador (informal)
- Reports to: Minister for Foreign Affairs
- Seat: Tirana, Albania
- Appointer: Government of Sweden
- Term length: No fixed term
- Inaugural holder: Lennart Finnmark
- Formation: June 1969
- Website: Swedish Embassy, Tirana

The Ambassador of Sweden to Albania (known formally as the Ambassador of the Kingdom of Sweden to the Republic of Albania) is the official representative of the government of Sweden to the president of Albania and government of Albania.

== History ==
On 10 April 1922, the King in Council recognized the Principality of Albania as an independent and sovereign state.

Sweden recognized the People's Republic of Albania in June 1969, and the Swedish ambassador in Belgrade, Lennart Finnmark, was concurrently accredited to Tirana. On 21 September 1969, the Albanian Telegraphic Agency (ATA) reported that Finnmark had presented his credentials to Haxhi Lleshi, Chairman of the Presidium of the People’s Assembly of Albania, at the Presidential Palace in Tirana.

The Swedish ambassador to Yugoslavia remained accredited to Albania until the dissolution of Yugoslavia in 1992. Thereafter, the role was transferred to Sweden's ambassador in Italy, and in 2008 it was taken over by Sweden's ambassador in Macedonia.

In 2010, a Swedish embassy was opened in Tirana. The ambassador remained resident in Skopje, Macedonia, and in his absence the embassy was headed by a chargé d'affaires ad interim.

In 2015, Johan Ndisi became Sweden's first resident ambassador in Tirana. He presented his credentials to President Bujar Nishani in October of that year.

== List of representatives ==
Name	Period	Title	Resident / Concurrent accreditation	Notes	Presented credentials	Ref
People's (Socialist) Republic of Albania (1946–1991)
Lennart Finnmark	June 1969 – 1975	Ambassador	Resident in Belgrade		September 1969	
Axel Lewenhaupt	1975–1978	Ambassador	Resident in Belgrade			
Bertil Arvidson	1978–1982	Ambassador	Resident in Belgrade			
Lennart Myrsten	1982–1987	Ambassador	Resident in Belgrade			
Jan af Sillén	1987–1991	Ambassador	Resident in Belgrade			
Republic of Albania (1991–present)
Jan af Sillén	1991–1992	Ambassador	Resident in Belgrade			
Ola Ullsten	1992–1996	Ambassador	Resident in Rome	Political appointee (non-career diplomat)		
Torsten Örn	1996–1998	Ambassador	Resident in Rome			
Göran Berg	1998–2002	Ambassador	Resident in Rome			
Staffan Wrigstad	2002–2006	Ambassador	Resident in Rome			
Anders Bjurner	2006–2008	Ambassador	Resident in Rome			
Lars Fredén	2008–2010	Ambassador	Resident in Skopje			
Lars Wahlund	2010–2013	Ambassador	Resident in Skopje			
Patrik Svensson	2010–2015	Chargé d'affaires ad interim				
Mats Staffansson	2013–2016	Ambassador	Resident in Skopje			
Johan Ndisi	2015–2016	Chargé d'affaires ad interim				
Johan Ndisi	September 2016 – 2019	Ambassador			October 2015	
Elsa Håstad	1 September 2019 – 2023	Ambassador			12 September 2019	
Niklas Ström	August 2023 – present	Ambassador			30 August 2023	

== See also ==
- Albania–Sweden relations
