= List of ambassadors of Sweden to Kosovo =

Ambassador of Sweden to Kosovo
- Lesser coat of arms of the Kingdom of Sweden
- Incumbent; Åsa Pehrson since August 2026
- Ministry for Foreign Affairs; Swedish Embassy, Pristina
- Style: His or Her Excellency (formal); Mr. or Madam Ambassador (informal)
- Reports to: Minister for Foreign Affairs
- Seat: Pristina, Kosovo
- Appointer: Government of Sweden
- Term length: No fixed term
- Inaugural holder: Ulrika Cronenberg-Mossberg
- Formation: 2008

The Ambassador of Sweden to Kosovo (known formally as the Ambassador of the Kingdom of Sweden to the Republic of Kosovo) is the official representative of the government of Sweden to the president of Kosovo and government of Kosovo.

== History ==
On 4 March 2008, the Swedish government recognised the Republic of Kosovo as an independent state. Sweden and Kosovo established diplomatic relations on 28 March 2008.

That same year, Sweden's ambassador in Skopje was appointed to be concurrently accredited to Pristina. In his absence, the embassy was headed by a chargé d'affaires ad interim.

Initially, Sweden did not have an embassy but instead a section office called the Office for Co-operation, operating under the Swedish International Development Cooperation Agency (Sida). This section office was upgraded to an embassy in 2010. The embassy became independent in September 2016 when the Swedish government appointed Henrik Nilsson as Sweden's first resident ambassador in Pristina.

== List of representatives ==
Name	Period	Title	Notes	Presented credentials	Ref
Ulrika Cronenberg-Mossberg	2008–2008	Ambassador	Resident in Skopje		
Lars Fredén	2008–2010	Ambassador	Resident in Skopje		
Ingrid Johansson	2009–2013	Chargé d'affaires ad interim (Note: With diplomatic rank of embassy counselor.)			
Lars Wahlund	2010–2013	Ambassador	Resident in Skopje		
Henrik Nilsson	September 2013 – September 2016	Chargé d'affaires ad interim (Note: With diplomatic rank of minister counselor.)			
Mats Staffansson	2014–2016	Ambassador	Resident in Skopje		
Henrik Nilsson	September 2016 – 2018	Ambassador		18 October 2016	
Karin Hernmarck Ahliny	1 September 2018 – 2022	Ambassador			
Jonas Westerlund	September 2022 – 2026	Ambassador		26 August 2022	
Åsa Pehrson	August 2026 – present	Ambassador			

== See also ==
- Kosovo–Sweden relations
