= Malena Mård =

Swedish diplomat

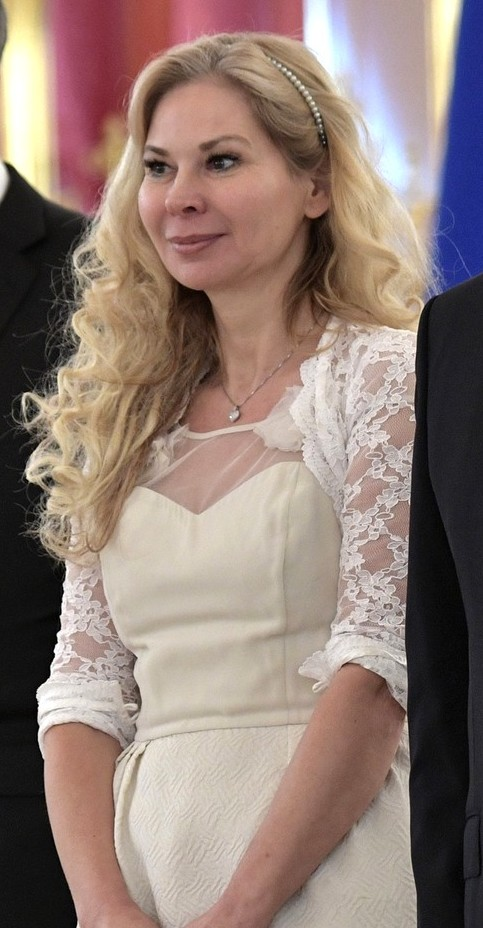
Malena Mard

Malena Mård (born 23 March 1969) is a Swedish diplomat who served as the Head of the European Union Delegation in Azerbaijan from 2014 until 2017. She became the Swedish ambassador to the Russian Federation when she presented her credentials, on 3 September 2019, to Deputy Minister of Foreign Affairs of Russia Vladimir Titov.

Mård graduated from Uppsala University and earned a MSc in business administration and economics. She has been serving as the Swedish ambassador to Turkey since 2023 until 2026.

Diplomatic posts
Preceded by Peter Ericson	Ambassador of Sweden to Russia; 2019–2023	Succeeded by Karin Olofsdotter
Preceded by Staffan Herrström	Ambassador of Sweden to Turkey; 2023–2026	Succeeded by Ulrika Funered
