= Stefan Eriksson (diplomat) =

Swedish diplomat

Personal details
- Born: 18 March 1962 (age 64) Västerås, Sweden
- Education: Stockholm School of Economics
- Awards: Mark Palmer Prize; Belarusian Democratic Republic 100th Jubilee Medal (2018); Cross of Good Neighbourhood (2023)

Stefan Eriksson (born 18 March 1962) is a Swedish diplomat, who was Ambassador of Sweden to Belarus in the period from 2008 to 2012. Prior to this, he served as the head of the Belarusian department of the Swedish Embassy in Moscow. In addition to his native Swedish language, he speaks English, French, German, Russian, and Belarusian. Eriksson is married and has three children.

In his role as the Ambassador, he showed solidarity with marginalized communities fighting for democracy in Belarus. In 2012, the Belarusian government expelled Eriksson from the country over his efforts in advocating democracy. In 2013 he was awarded the Mark Palmer Prize for his involvement in Belarus, and in 2019 - the Belarusian Democratic Republic Centenary Medal. In 2023 Eriksson received the Cross of Good Neighbourhood from Sviatlana Tsikhanouskaya. The distinction is awarded by the Belarusian United Transitional Cabinet to outstanding individuals who have significantly helped the cause of Belarusians.

Between 1 August 2017 and 31 July 2025, Stefan Eriksson was the Director of the Nordic Council of Ministers’ Office in Latvia. In this position he actively promoted Nordic-Baltic cooperation, democratic values and the exchange of knowledge and experience in the region. While residing in Riga, he became fluent in the Latvian language, which assisted greatly in building diplomatic relations.

As of August 2025, he has been appointed Ambassador of the Kingdom of Sweden to Kazakhstan.

Diplomatic posts
Preceded by Johan Molander	Ambassador of Sweden to Belarus; 2008–2012	Succeeded by Martin Åberg as Chargé d'affaires ad interim
Preceded by Ewa Polano	Ambassador of Sweden to Kazakhstan; 2025–present	Succeeded by Incumbent
