= List of ambassadors of Sweden to North Macedonia =

Ambassador of Sweden to North Macedonia
- Lesser coat of arms of the Kingdom of Sweden

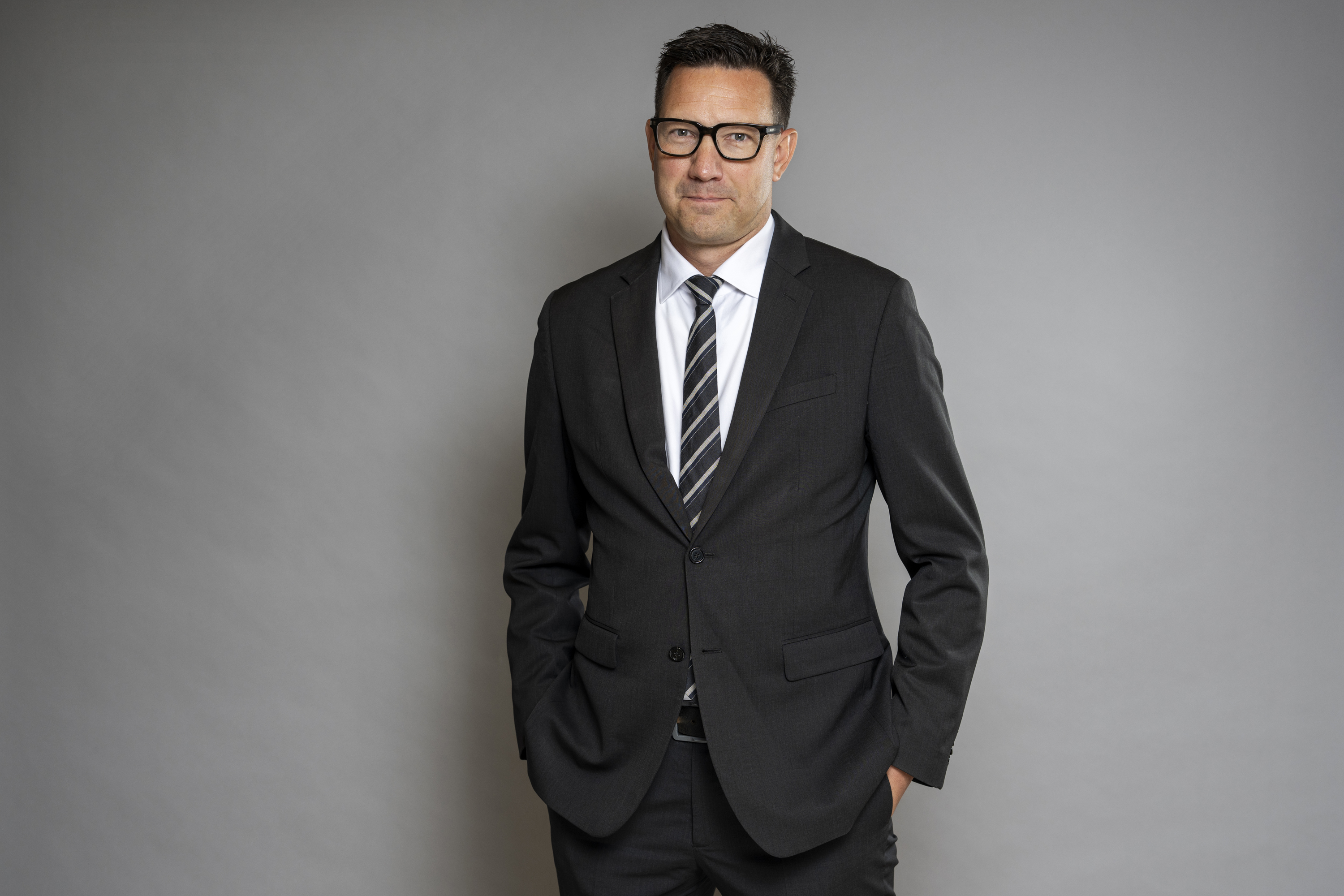
- Incumbent; Ola Sohlström since 2025
- Ministry for Foreign Affairs; Swedish Embassy, Skopje
- Style: His or Her Excellency (formal); Mr. or Madam Ambassador (informal)
- Reports to: Minister for Foreign Affairs
- Seat: Skopje, North Macedonia
- Appointer: Government of Sweden
- Term length: No fixed term
- Inaugural holder: Erik Pierre
- Formation: 17 February 1994

The Ambassador of Sweden to North Macedonia (known formally as the Ambassador of the Kingdom of Sweden to the Republic of North Macedonia) is the official representative of the government of Sweden to the president of North Macedonia and government of North Macedonia.

== History ==
The Swedish government decided on 16 December 1993 to enter into an agreement with the former Yugoslav Republic of Macedonia (FYROM) on the establishment of diplomatic relations through an exchange of notes. The agreement entered into force on 20 December 1993 after it was signed in New York City.

In 1993, Sweden opened a consulate in Skopje. On 17 February 1994, Erik Pierre was appointed as Sweden's first ambassador to be accredited in Skopje, with residence in Stockholm. On 19 September 1996, Sweden's ambassador in Belgrade was also appointed to be accredited as ambassador to Skopje. The ambassador in Belgrade continued to hold dual accreditation to Skopje until 2005.

In 2000, the consulate was upgraded into an Office for Cooperation through the introduction of bilateral development cooperation managed by the Swedish International Development Cooperation Agency (Sida). In 2005, the Office for Cooperation was upgraded to an embassy. The Swedish embassy was officially inaugurated on 25 August 2005. That same year, Sweden appointed its first resident ambassador in Skopje.

The Swedish ambassador was concurrently accredited in Pristina, Kosovo, and Tirana, Albania, between 2008 and 2016.

== List of representatives ==
Name	Period	Title	Notes	Presented credentials	Ref
former Yugoslav Republic of Macedonia (1993–2019)
Erik Pierre	17 February 1994 – 1996	Ambassador	Resident in Stockholm.		
Mats Staffansson	19 September 1996 – 2000	Ambassador	Resident in Belgrade.		
Michael Sahlin	2000–2002	Ambassador	Resident in Belgrade.		
Lars-Göran Engfeldt	2002–2005	Ambassador	Resident in Belgrade.		
Ulrika Cronenberg-Mossberg	2005–2008	Ambassador	Also accredited to Pristina (from 2008).		
Lars Fredén	2008–2010	Ambassador	Also accredited to Pristina and Tirana.		
Lars Wahlund	2010–2013	Ambassador	Also accredited to Pristina and Tirana.		
Mats Staffansson	2014–2019	Ambassador	Also accredited to Pristina and Tirana (both until 2016 (Note: In 2016, Henrik Nilsson was appointed as Sweden's first resident ambassador in Pristina, and in the same year Johan Ndisi was appointed as Sweden's first resident ambassador in Tirana. Mats Staffansson was therefore no longer ambassador in Pristina and Tirana.)).		
Republic of North Macedonia (2019–present)
Kristin Forsgren Bengtsson	1 September 2019 – 2022	Ambassador			
Ami Larsson-Jain	September 2022 – 2025	Ambassador			
Ola Sohlström	2025–present	Ambassador		16 September 2025	
