= List of ambassadors of Sweden to Uzbekistan =

Ambassador of Sweden to Uzbekistan
- Lesser coat of arms of the Kingdom of Sweden
- Incumbent; Martin Rosén since August 2026
- Ministry for Foreign Affairs
- Style: His or Her Excellency (formal); Mr. or Madam Ambassador (informal)
- Reports to: Minister for Foreign Affairs
- Seat: Stockholm, Sweden
- Appointer: Government of Sweden
- Term length: No fixed term
- Inaugural holder: Örjan Berner
- Formation: 1993

The Ambassador of Sweden to Uzbekistan (known formally as the Ambassador of the Kingdom of Sweden to the Republic of Uzbekistan) is the official representative of the government of Sweden to the president of Uzbekistan and government of Uzbekistan. Since Sweden does not have an embassy in Tashkent, Sweden's ambassador to Uzbekistan is based in Stockholm, Sweden.

== History ==
On 16 January 1992, the Swedish government recognized Uzbekistan as an independent state. On 2 April 1992, the Swedish government decided to establish diplomatic relations with Uzbekistan. The agreement came into effect on 8 April 1992, when it was signed in Tashkent by Ambassador Örjan Berner on behalf of Sweden and A. Abdurazakov on behalf of Uzbekistan. The following year, Sweden's ambassador in Moscow was also accredited to Uzbekistan. From 2004 onward, a Stockholm-based ambassador-at-large was appointed, who in addition to Uzbekistan is also ambassador to other Central Asian countries.

== List of representatives ==
Name	Period	Title	Notes	Presented credentials	Ref
Örjan Berner	1993–1994	Ambassador	Resident in Moscow		
Sven Hirdman	1994–2004	Ambassador	Resident in Moscow		
Hans Olsson	2004–2012	Ambassador	Resident in Stockholm		
Åke Peterson	2012–2015	Ambassador	Resident in Stockholm		
Ingrid Tersman	September 2015 – 2022	Ambassador	Resident in Stockholm	29 August 2016	
Tomas Danestad	2022–2026	Ambassador	Resident in Stockholm		
Martin Rosén	August 2026 – present	Ambassador	Resident in Stockholm		
