= Henrik Liljegren (diplomat) =

Swedish ambassador and author

- Born: Carl Henrik Sihver Liljegren; 17 April 1936 (age 89); Tallinn, Estonia
- Education: St. Albans School; Sigtunaskolan
- Alma mater: Stockholm University
- Occupation: Diplomat
- Years active: 1960–2001
- Spouse: Nil Kirectepe (m. 1984)

Carl Henrik Sihver Liljegren (born 17 April 1936) is a Swedish diplomat and author whose career spanned more than four decades. After earning a law degree from Stockholm University in 1960, he joined the Swedish Ministry for Foreign Affairs as an attaché. He held early postings in Tokyo, Berlin, and Paris before advancing to senior roles in the Foreign Ministry. Liljegren served as ambassador to Turkey (1981–1985), East Germany (1985–1989), Belgium (1989–1992), and the United States (1993–1997). He was later consul general in Istanbul and returned as ambassador to Turkey, also accredited to Azerbaijan, until his retirement in 2001. An author and lifetime director of the Atlantic Council, Liljegren documented his experiences in From Tallinn to Turkey – as a Swede and Diplomat.

== Early life ==
Liljegren was born on 17 April 1936 in Tallinn, Estonia, the son of Edmund Sihver, a civil engineer, and his wife Eva Liljegren, née Kjellberg. His father was Baltic German and his mother became a well-known translator. As a four-year-old, he came out on the last boat to Sweden in 1940. In the early 1950s, he moved to the United States where his stepfather, Mårten Liljegren, was cultural attaché in Washington, D.C. Henrik Liljegren went to St. Albans School for a year before trying farm work one summer in Ohio as a sixteen-year-old. Back in Sweden, he went to Sigtunaskolan before enrolling in university. Liljegren received a Candidate of Law degree from Stockholm University in 1960.

== Career ==
Liljegren was hired as an attaché by the Swedish Ministry for Foreign Affairs in 1960 and served as in Tokyo in 1961, as vice consul in Berlin in 1963, and as consul there in 1964. He served at the Foreign Ministry in Stockholm in 1966 and as a desk officer (departementssekreterare) there in 1968. Liljegren was first embassy secretary at the OECD delegation in Paris in 1970, served as deputy director (kansliråd) in the political department at the Foreign Ministry in 1975, and as director (departementsråd) in 1979.

Liljegren served as ambassador in Ankara from 1981 to 1985, in East Berlin from 1985 to 1989, in Brussels from 1989 to 1992 and in Washington D.C. from 1993 to 1997. Between 1997 and 1998, he was the consul general in Istanbul and from 1998 until his retirement in 2001 he again served as ambassador to Turkey in Ankara, with additional accredition in Baku. He is the author of From Tallinn to Turkey - as a Swede and Diplomat and he is a lifetime director of the Atlantic Council.

== Personal life ==
In 1984, Liljegren married Nil Kirectepe (née Ilden), the daughter of minister Nevit Ilden and Murassa (née Tamtekin).

== Bibliography ==
- Liljegren, Henrik (2004). Från Tallinn till Turkiet: som svensk och diplomat (in Swedish). Stockholm: Timbro. ISBN 9175665506. SELIBR 9408534.

Diplomatic posts
| Preceded by Rune Nyström | Ambassador of Sweden to Turkey; 1981–1985 | Succeeded by Lennart Dafgård |
| Preceded by Rune Nyström | Ambassador of Sweden to East Germany; 1985–1989 | Succeeded by Vidar Hellners |
| Preceded by Kaj Sundberg | Ambassador of Sweden to Belgium; 1989–1992 | Succeeded by Göran Berg |
| Preceded by Anders Thunborg | Ambassador of Sweden to the United States; 1993–1997 | Succeeded by Rolf Ekéus |
| Preceded by Ingemar Börjesson | Consul general of Sweden to Istanbul; 1997–1998 | Succeeded by Sture Theolin |
| Preceded by Michael Sahlin | Ambassador of Sweden to Turkey; 1998–2001 | Succeeded by Ann Dismorr |
| Preceded by Michael Sahlin | Ambassador of Sweden to Azerbaijan; 1998–2001 | Succeeded by Ann Dismorr |
