= List of ambassadors of Sweden to Turkey =

Ambassador of Sweden to Turkey
- Lesser coat of arms of the Kingdom of Sweden
- Incumbent; Ulrika Funered since August 2026
- Ministry for Foreign Affairs; Swedish Embassy, Ankara
- Style: His or Her Excellency (formal); Mr. or Madam Ambassador (informal)
- Reports to: Minister for Foreign Affairs
- Residence: Katip Çelebi Sokak No:7, Kavaklıdere (Note: The ambassador's residence is at the same location as the chancery.)
- Seat: Ankara, Turkey
- Appointer: Government of Sweden
- Term length: No fixed term
- Inaugural holder: Axel Reenstierna
- Formation: 1727
- Website: Swedish Embassy, Ankara

The Ambassador of Sweden to Turkey (known formally as the Ambassador of the Kingdom of Sweden to the Republic of Türkiye) is the official representative of the government of Sweden to the president of Turkey and the government of Turkey.

== History ==
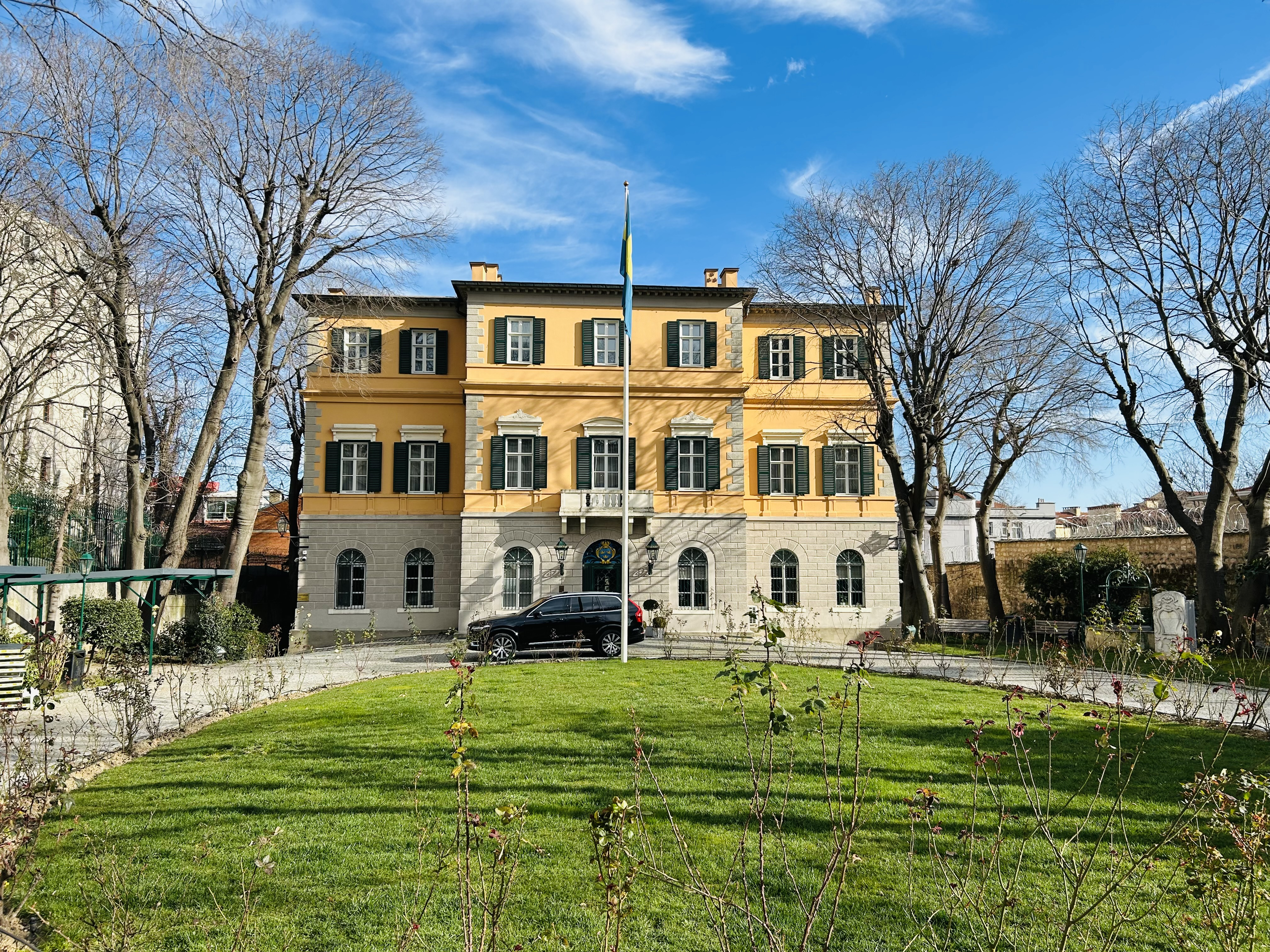
Palais de Suède, Istanbul, the representative home of Swedish diplomacy from 1757 to the 1920s

In a report on the reorganization of the Ministry for Foreign Affairs in early January 1921, it was proposed that the head of the mission in Constantinople also be accredited in Sofia, Belgrade, Athens, Tiflis, Baku, and eventually in Armenia. However, the experts suggested that, for the time being, the minister should be accredited only in Sofia.

In December 1956, an agreement was reached between the Swedish and Turkish governments on the mutual elevation of the respective countries' legations to embassies. The diplomatic rank was thereafter changed to ambassador instead of envoy extraordinary and minister plenipotentiary.

== List of representatives ==
Name	Period	Title	Notes	Ref
Ottoman Empire (1299–1922)
Axel Reenstierna	1727 – 16 February 1730	Minister	Died on 16 February 1730 in Stockholm before he could take up the aforementioned position.	
Carl Fredrik von Höpken	7 December 1734 – 1738	Chargé d'affaires	Along with Edvard Carleson.	
Carl Fredrik von Höpken	17 August 1738 – 1742	Envoy extraordinary	Along with Edvard Carleson.	
Edvard Carleson	7 December 1734 – 1742	Chargé d'affaires	Along with Carl Fredrik von Höpken.	
Edvard Carleson	17 August 1738 – 1742	Envoy extraordinary	Along with Carl Fredrik von Höpken.	
Gustaf Celsing	6 July 1747 – 1750	Resident		
Gustaf Celsing	19 January 1750 – 1770	Envoy		
Ulric Celsing	27 November 1770 – 20 January 1780	Envoy	Letter of credence 3 June 1771. Also acting consul in Smyrna on 16 May 1777.	
Ignatius Mouradgea d'Ohsson	December 1782 – May 1783	Chargé d'affaires ad interim		
Gerhard von Heidenstam	7 November 1782 – 24 February 1791	Minister	Also acting consul in the Levant 16 February 1787.	
Carl Gustaf Adlerberg	9 June 1787 – ?	Chargé d'affaires ad interim		
Georg Joseph von Brentano	22 January 1789 – 17 January 1792	Minister	Along with Pehr Olof von Asp. (Note: Von Brentano was an envoy in Constantinople on a special mission on 22 January 1789 (Swedish minister in Constantinople along with Pehr Olof von Asp on 24 February 1791, according to a renewed letter of credence, which, however, was to be retained by von Asp for the time being and probably was not used).)	
Carl Gustaf Adlerberg	30 October 1792 – 17 July 1795	»co-minister»		
Pehr Olof von Asp	24 February 1791 – 17 July 1795	Minister	Also consul general in the Levant.	
Ignatius Mouradgea d'Ohsson	1795–1795	Chargé d'affaires		
Ignatius Mouradgea d'Ohsson	8 July 1795 – 1 May 1805	Minister plenipotentiary	On leave 26 February 1799.	
Carl Gustaf König	26 February 1799 – 31 May 1805	Chargé d'affaires	Also acting consul general in the Levant.	
Nils Gustaf Palin	31 May 1805 – 1814	Chargé d'affaires	Also consul general in the Levant.	
Nils Gustaf Palin	15 December 1814 – 20 February 1824	Resident minister		
Carl Gustaf Löwenhielm	20 February 1824 – 1827	Resident minister	Also acting consul general in the Levant.	
Albrecht Elof Ihre	4 July 1827 – 1831	Chargé d'affaires		
Anton Testa	1831–1838	Chargé d'affaires		
Uno von Troil	29 June 1838 – 9 April 1839	Resident minister	Died in office.	
Anton Testa	1839–1858	Chargé d'affaires		
Georg Sibbern	1858–1858	Envoy		
Peter Collett	1859–1860	Envoy		
Carl Wachtmeister	20 July 1861 – October 1861	Envoy		
Oscar Björnstjerna	1 November 1861 – 1862	Chargé d'affaires ad interim		
Oscar Björnstjerna	29 April 1862 – 1863	Chargé d'affaires		
Oscar Björnstjerna	27 March 1863 – 1864	Resident minister		
Carl Fredrik Palmstierna	16 October 1865 – 1 December 1868	Envoy extraordinary and minister plenipotentiary		
Oluf Stenersen	? – 20 January 1869	Chargé d'affaires ad interim		
Oluf Stenersen	21 January 1869 – May 1869	Resident minister		
Selim Ehrenhoff	1 May 1869 – 1879	Resident minister		
Selim Ehrenhoff	11 July 1879 – 9 December 1887	Minister plenipotentiary		
Gustaf Lennart Reuterskiöld	9 October 1888 – 1890	Envoy extraordinary and minister plenipotentiary		
Otto Stenbock	16 October 1890 – 1900	Acting minister plenipotentiary		
Otto Stenbock	29 June 1900 – 1903	Envoy extraordinary and minister plenipotentiary		
Joachim Beck-Friis	22 May 1903 – 1905	Envoy extraordinary and minister plenipotentiary		
Charles Emil Ramel	9 June 1905 – 28 September 1906	Envoy extraordinary and minister plenipotentiary		
Cossva Anckarsvärd	28 September 1906 – 1920	Envoy	Also consul general there. Also accredited to Sofia (from 8 April 1914).	
Gustaf Wallenberg	1921–1923	Envoy	Also accredited to Sofia.	
Republic of Turkey (1923–present)
Gustaf Wallenberg	1923–1930	Envoy	Also accredited to Sofia.	
Johannes Kolmodin	20 August 1924 – 4 October 1930	Chargé d'affaires ad interim	On various occasions.	
Carl von Heidenstam	14 July 1930 – 1931	Envoy	Also accredited to Sofia.	
Erik Boheman	1931–1934	Envoy	Also accredited to Athens (from 1933) and Sofia.	
Wilhelm Winther	1934–1937	Envoy	Also accredited to Athens and Sofia (until 1935).	
Eric Gyllenstierna	1938–1939	Envoy	Also accredited to Athens.	
Sven Allard	1939–1940	Chargé d'affaires		
Einar Modig	21 August 1939 (Note: Assumed the position in 1941.) – 1945	Envoy	Also accredited to Athens.	
Knut Richard Thyberg	1940–1941	Chargé d'affaires ad interim		
Eric von Post	1945–1951	Envoy		
Adolf Croneborg	1951 – December 1956	Envoy		
Adolf Croneborg	December 1956 – 1959	Ambassador		
Åke Malmaeus	1959–1963	Ambassador		
Jan Stenström	1964–1968	Ambassador		
Harry Bagge	1969–1973	Ambassador		
Östen Lundborg	1973–1975	Ambassador		
Lennart Myrsten	1975–1977	Ambassador		
Rune Nyström	1977–1981	Ambassador		
Henrik Liljegren	1982–1985	Ambassador		
Lennart Dafgård	1985–1989	Ambassador		
Erik Cornell	1990–1995	Ambassador		
Michael Sahlin	1995–1998	Ambassador	Also accredited to Baku (from 1997).	
Henrik Liljegren	1998–2001	Ambassador	Also accredited to Baku.	
Ann Dismorr	2001–2005	Ambassador	Also accredited to Baku.	
Christer Asp	2005–2010	Ambassador		
Håkan Åkesson	2010–2013	Ambassador		
Lars Wahlund	2013–2018	Ambassador		
Annika Molin Hellgren	1 September 2018 – 2020	Ambassador		
Staffan Herrström	1 September 2020 – 2023	Ambassador		
Malena Mård	August 2023 – 2026	Ambassador		
Ulrika Funered	August 2026 – present	Ambassador		

== See also ==
- Sweden–Turkey relations
