= List of ambassadors of Sweden to Russia =

Ambassador of Sweden to Russia
- Lesser coat of arms of the Kingdom of Sweden
- Incumbent; Christina Johannesson since 2025
- Ministry for Foreign Affairs; Swedish Embassy, Moscow
- Style: His or Her Excellency (formal); Mr. or Madam Ambassador (informal)
- Reports to: Minister for Foreign Affairs
- Residence: 60 Mosfilmovskaya Street (Note: The ambassador's residence is at the same location as the chancery.)
- Seat: Moscow, Russia
- Appointer: Government of Sweden
- Term length: No fixed term
- Inaugural holder: Herman Cedercreutz
- Formation: 1722
- Website: Swedish Embassy, Moscow

The Ambassador of Sweden to Russia (known formally as the Ambassador of the Kingdom of Sweden to the Russian Federation) is the official representative of the government of Sweden to the president of Russia and government of Russia.

== History ==
The Swedish government decided on 15 March 1924, to recognize and establish consular and diplomatic relations with the Union of Soviet Socialist Republics.

Following the dissolution of the Soviet Union, the Russian Federation was established on 12 December 1991. On 19 December 1991, the Swedish government recognized the Russian Federation as an independent state. On 2 April 1992, Sweden and the Russian Federation reviewed agreements made with the former Soviet Union. The Swedish Ministry for Foreign Affairs submitted a list of valid agreements on 3 September 1992, dated 2 September 1992. The Russian Ministry of Foreign Affairs confirmed this list as joint on 5 November 1992. The Swedish government approved this assessment on 28 January 1993.

== List of representatives ==
Name	Term start	Term end	Title	Resident / Concurrent accreditation	Notes	Presented credentials	Ref
Russian Empire (1721–1917)
Johan von Lilienthal	22 December 1664	1667	Resident				
Herman Cedercreutz	15 March 1722	21 July 1729	Envoy				
Josias Cederhielm	1725	1726	Ambassador				
Joachim von Dittmer	21 July 1729	1738	Envoy				
Eric Matthias von Nolcken	13 July 1738	20 May 1741	Envoy				
Nils Bark	1 December 1743	25 June 1747	Envoy				
Gustaf Wulfvenstierna	1747	1748	Envoy Extraordinaire				
Gustaf Wilhelm von Höpken	1748	26 August 1749	Envoy Extraordinaire		Died in office		
Johan August Greiffenheim	1749	1752	Envoy Extraordinaire				
Carl Barthold Lagerflycht	1749	1752	Chargé d'affaires				
Mauritz Posse	1752	1762	Envoy				
Carl Wilhelm von Düben	4 May 1763	1766	Envoy				
Carl Ribbing	1766	1773	Envoy Extraordinaire				
Fredric Nolcken	29 April 1773	14 July 1788	Envoy Extraordinaire				
Gustaf d'Albedyhll	August 1780	September 1780	Chargé d'affaires ad interim				
Gustaf d'Albedyhll	10 May 1782	November 1783	Chargé d'affaires ad interim				
Carl Eherenfried von Carisien	1785	1787	Resident minister				
Curt von Stedingk	August 1790	February 1808	Ambassador				
Fredrik Samuel Silverstolpe	1805	1807	Chargé d'affaires				
Curt von Stedingk	September 1809	December 1811	Ambassador				
Baltasar af Schenbom	1811	30 April 1812	Chargé d'affaires		Died in office		
Carl Löwenhielm	1 September 1812	1819	Envoy				
Nils Fredric Palmstjerna	30 September 1820	19 August 1845	Envoy extraordinary and minister plenipotentiary				
Gustaf af Nordin	9 October 1845	28 September 1856	Envoy				
Georg Adelswärd	5 December 1856	1858	Envoy				
Frederik Anton Ferdinand Hartwig Wedel-Jarlsberg	1858	1865	Envoy				
Oscar Björnstjerna	31 October 1865	1872	Envoy				
Otto Stenbock	26 August 1867	8 November 1867	Chargé d'affaires				
Otto Stenbock	22 July 1868	28 September 1868	Chargé d'affaires				
Otto Stenbock	28 August 1869	1 November 1869	Chargé d'affaires				
Frederik Georg Knut Due	November 1873	1890	Envoy				
Arvid Taube	30 June 1888	31 September 1888	Chargé d'affaires ad interim				
Arvid Taube	29 June 1889	7 October 1889	Chargé d'affaires ad interim				
Gustaf Leonard (Lennart) Reuterskiöld	24 September 1890	7 July 1899	Envoy extraordinary and minister plenipotentiary		Died in office		
Arvid Taube	13 June 1890	10 November 1890	Chargé d'affaires ad interim				
Arvid Taube	1 June 1891	3 July 1891	Chargé d'affaires ad interim				
Arvid Taube	18 August 1891	11 October 1891	Chargé d'affaires ad interim				
Gustaf Falkenberg	11 August 1898	9 November 1898	Chargé d'affaires ad interim				
August Gyldenstolpe	1899	1904	Envoy				
Herman Wrangel	31 December 1904	1906	Envoy extraordinary and minister plenipotentiary				
Edvard Brändström	12 March 1906	1920 (Note: In the fall of 1918, Brändström left Saint Petersburg and returned to Stockholm but kept his position until 1920.)	Envoy				
Carl von Heidenstam	1911	1916	Chargé d'affaires ad interim		At different times		
Soviet Union (1922–1991)
Carl von Heidenstam	22 March 1924	26 June 1924	Chargé d'affaires ad interim				
Carl von Heidenstam	27 June 1924	1930	Envoy	Also accredited to Tehran from 26 March 1929			
Eric Gyllenstierna	1930	1 October 1937	Envoy	Also accredited to Tehran from 5 September 1930 to 1936 and to Baghdad from 18 May 1934 to 1936			
Wilhelm Winther	1 March 1938	1940	Envoy				
Vilhelm Assarsson	1940	1944	Envoy		Declared persona non grata on 17 December 1943 (Note: On 17 December 1943, Assarsson was declared persona non grata. The stated reason was that the Swedish military attaché, Captain Hans Nygren, had allegedly passed Soviet military secrets to Germany. Assarsson returned to Stockholm in February 1944.)		
Staffan Söderblom	28 April 1944	June 1946	Envoy		Assumed office 16 July		
Gunnar Hägglöf	1946	1947	Envoy				
Rolf Sohlman	15 April 1947	29 December 1947	Envoy				
Rolf Sohlman	30 December 1947	1964	Ambassador	Also accredited to Afghanistan (1948–60), Romania (1951–63), and Bulgaria (1951–63). (Note: Envoy to Kabul from 30 June 1948 (assumed office on 24 May 1949) to 1960, also to Bucharest from 1 September (assumed office on 6 October) 1951 to 1963, and also to Sofia from 1 September (assumed office on 19 October) 1951 to 1963.)			
Gunnar Jarring	1964	1973	Ambassador	Also accredited to Mongolia			
Brynolf Eng	1973	1975	Ambassador	Also accredited to Mongolia from 1974			
Göran Ryding	1975	1979	Ambassador	Also accredited to Mongolia		13 October 1975	
Carl De Geer	1979	1983	Ambassador	Also accredited to Mongolia			
Torsten Örn	1983	1986	Ambassador	Also accredited to Mongolia			
Anders Thunborg	1986	1989	Ambassador	Also accredited to Mongolia			
Örjan Berner	1989	1991	Ambassador	Also accredited to Mongolia			
Russian Federation (1991–present)
Örjan Berner	1991	1994	Ambassador	Also accredited to Mongolia (1989–92), Armenia (1992–94), Azerbaijan (1992–94), Georgia (1992–94), Kazakhstan (1993–94), Kyrgyzstan (1993–94), Tajikistan (1993–94), Turkmenistan (1993–94), Uzbekistan (1993–94), and Belarus (1992–94)			
Sven Hirdman	1994	2004	Ambassador	Also accredited to Armenia, Azerbaijan (1994–97), Georgia, Kazakhstan, Kyrgyzstan, Tajikistan, Turkmenistan, Uzbekistan, and Belarus			
Johan Molander	2004	2008	Ambassador	Also accredited to Armenia (2004–06), Georgia (2004–06), and Belarus			
Tomas Bertelman	2008	2012	Ambassador				
Veronika Bard Bringéus	2012	2015	Ambassador				
Peter Ericson	2015	2019	Ambassador				
Malena Mård	1 September 2019	2023	Ambassador				
Karin Olofsdotter	August 2023	2025	Ambassador				
Christina Johannesson	2025	Incumbent	Ambassador				

== See also ==
- Russia–Sweden relations
- Embassy of Sweden, Moscow
