= Coat of arms of Sweden =

Greater coat of arms of the Kingdom of Sweden

Versions
- Version without the ermine mantling

- Version without the ermine mantling, the compartment and the supporters

- Version consisting of the crowned escutcheon only

- The banner of arms, which serves as a royal military command sign. Introduced by royal regulation in 1943, it has only been created once.
- Armiger: Kingdom of Sweden
- Adopted: 1448; 17 November 1905
- Crest: Royal Crown of Sweden
- Shield: Azure, quartered by a cross or with outbent arms, and an inescutcheon containing the dynastic arms of the Royal House. In the first and fourth fields three open crowns Or, placed two above one. In the second and third fields three sinisterbendwise streams argent, a lion crowned with an open crown or armed gules. The inescutcheon is party per pale the arms for the House of Vasa (Bendwise azure, argent and gules, a vasa (sheaf of wheat) Or); and the House of Bernadotte (Azure, issuant from a wavy base a bridge with three arches and two towers embattled argent, in honour point an eagle regardant with wings inverted resting on thunderbolts Or, and in chief the Big Dipper constellation of the same).
- Supporters: two lions regardant, crowned and with forked tails (queue fourchée) Or armed gules, standing on a compartment Or
- Compartment: Pedestal Or
- Order: Order of Seraphim
- Other elements: All surrounded by ermine mantling, crowned with a royal crown and tied up with tasseladorned strings Or

Lesser coat of arms of the Kingdom of Sweden

Versions
- Version without the Order of the Seraphim
- Armiger: The Riksdag; Government of Sweden; King of Sweden
- Adopted: 1336; 17 November 1905
- Crest: Royal Crown of Sweden
- Shield: Azure, three coronets Or, placed two above one
- Order: Order of Seraphim

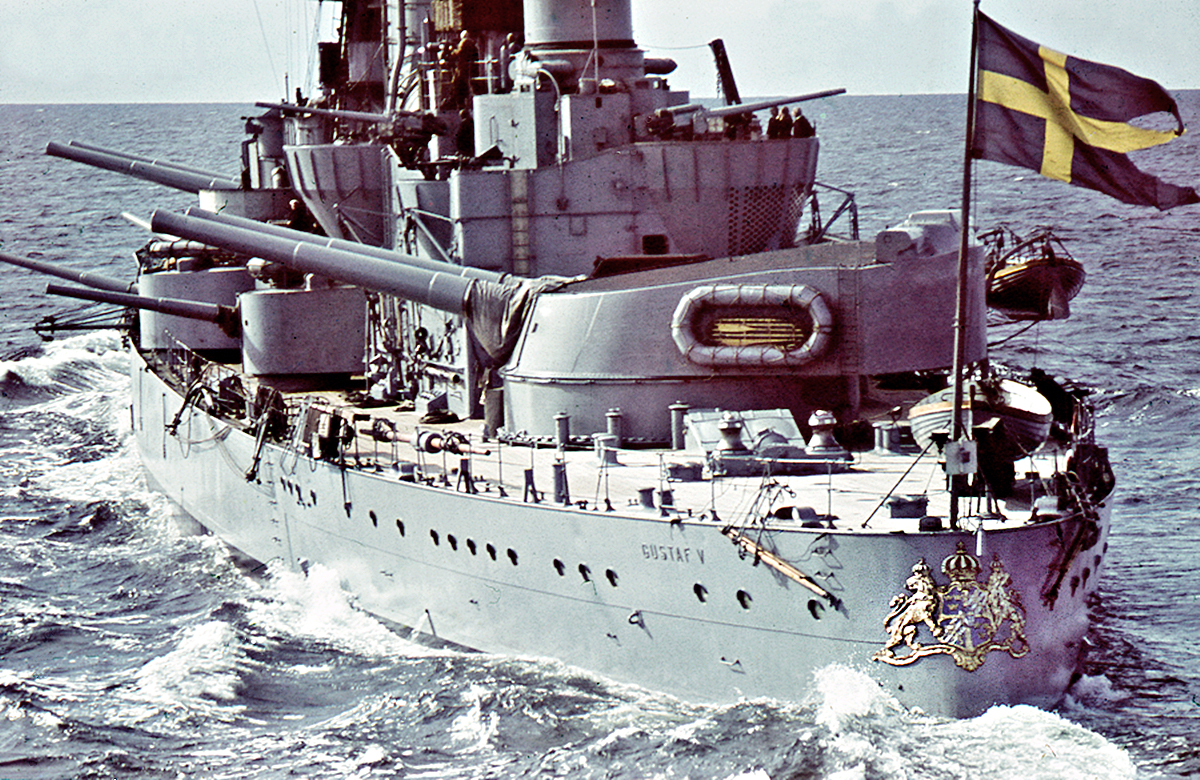
Arms adorning the stern of HSwMS Gustaf V

The coat of arms of the Kingdom of Sweden (Swedish: Sveriges riksvapen) is the arms of dominion of the Swedish monarch. It has a greater and a lesser version. The shield displays the "Three Crowns of Sweden" quartering the "Lion of Bjälbo", with an inescutcheon overall of the House of Vasa impaling the House of Bernadotte.

== Regulated usage ==
The usage of the coats of arms is regulated by Swedish Law, Act 1970:498 which states (in unofficial translation) that "in commercial activities, the coats of arms, the flag or other official insignia of Sweden may not be used in a trademark or other insignias for products or services without proper authorisation. This includes any mark or text referring to the Swedish State which this can give the commercial mark a sign of official endorsement. This includes municipal coats of arms which are registered."

Any representation consisting of three crowns ordered two above one are considered to be the lesser coat of arms, and its usage is therefore restricted by law 1970:498.

== Variants ==
The arms of Sweden were first formally codified by law in 1908. This law also formally codifies the differences between the "greater" and "lesser" arms. The present law prescribing the two arms dates from 1982.

=== Greater version ===
The greater coat of arms is blazoned in Swedish law as follows:

A shield azure, quartered by a cross Or with outbent arms, and an inescutcheon containing the dynastic arms of the Royal House. In the first and fourth fields three open crowns Or, placed two above one. In the second and third fields three sinisterbendwise streams argent, a lion crowned with an open crown Or armed gules. The inescutcheon is party per pale the arms for the House of Vasa (Bendwise azure, argent and gules, a vasa Or); and the House of Bernadotte (Azure, issuant from a wavy base a bridge with three arches and two towers embattled argent, in honor point an eagle regardant with wings inverted resting on thunderbolts Or, and in chief the Big Dipper constellation of the same). The main shield is crowned by a royal crown and surrounded by the insignia of the Order of the Seraphim. Supported by two lions regardant, crowned and with forked tails Or armed gules, standing on a compartment Or. All surrounded by purpure mantling doubled ermine, crowned with a royal crown and tied up with tasseled strings Or.

The greater arms may also be displayed only with the crowned escutcheon. While the arms have undergone significant changes over the years, such as changing the inescutcheon with the ruling dynasty, they are based on arms created by King Charles VIII in 1448.

The escutcheon used in the greater blazon has in total five elements: 4 quarterings on the main escutcheon (two coats of arms duplicated), and three coat of arms incorporated into an escutcheon of pretense. However, Bernadotte never used any stars in the arms of Pontecorvo (neither as Prince of Pontecorvo, nor as King of Sweden and Norway). The stars were introduced as an element in the royal coat of arms in the 19th century, chosen as a symbol of Sweden's eternal existence, as in the poem by Esaias Tegnér:

As long as Charles's Wain still turns,
Its golden wheels around the Northern zone,
As long as the land still produces iron and heroes,
Intact shall stand the ancient Swedish throne.

This symbol became especially popular through its allusion to the name that had been borne by so many famous Swedish kings. The Big Dipper, or as it is called in Swedish, Karlavagnen (Charles' Wain), adds a Swedish accent to the Bernadotte dynastic coat of arms much in the same way as do the Vasa arms.

The three crowns	House of Bjälbo	House of Bernadotte
The House of Vasa	Arms of Jean-Baptiste Jules Bernadotte as Prince of Ponte Corvo and Marshal of France (later Charles XIV John of Sweden)
Big Dipper/Charles' Wain	Napoleon I (Jove's Eagle)	Ponte Corvo

The arms are supported by two lions with forked tails (queue fourchée), facing away from the shield and crowned with Royal Crowns. For centuries, the lion has been an important element in Swedish heraldry and especially for the State Coat of Arms. The shield may be surmounted by the Collar of the Order of Seraphim, the foremost order in Sweden, and the highest honour the Swedish state can bestow on an individual.

Besides being the official national coat of arms, the greater coat of arms is also the personal coat of arms of the king, and as such he can decree its use as a personal coat of arms by other members of the Royal House, with the alterations and additions decided by him.

Blazon: "The greater state arms consist of a head shield azure, quartered by a cross or with outbent arms, and an inescutcheon containing the dynastic arms of the Royal House.

In the first and fourth fields three coronets or, placed two above one. In the second and third fields three sinisterbendwise streams argent, a lion crowned with an open crown or with armaments gules. The inescutcheon is party per pale the arms for the House of Vasa and the House of Bernadotte. The main shield is crowned by a royal crown and surrounded by the insignia of the Order of the Seraphim. Supported by two lions regardant or crowned, with parted tails and armaments gules, standing on a postament. All surrounded by hermine mantling crowned with a royal crown and tied up with tasseled strings or."

=== Lesser version ===
The lesser coat of arms is mainly used by the Government of Sweden and subordinate State authorities. As such it may be joined by insignias symbolising the activity of individual government agencies, following approval by the State Board of Heraldry. It is, for instance, embroidered on all Swedish police uniforms and in various coats of arms of the Swedish Armed Forces, and is displayed on Sweden's passports and embassies.

Blazon: "Azure, with three coronets Or, ordered two above one." Crowned with a royal crown. The shield may also be surrounded by the insignias of the Order of the Seraphim."

== See also ==
- Swedish heraldry
- Three Crowns
- Flag of Sweden
- List of flags of Sweden
