= List of ambassadors of Sweden to Norway =

Ambassador of Sweden to Norway
- Lesser coat of arms of the Kingdom of Sweden

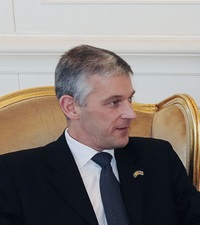
- Incumbent; Mikael Eriksson since 2024
- Ministry for Foreign Affairs; Swedish Embassy, Oslo
- Style: His or Her Excellency (formal); Mr. or Madam Ambassador (informal)
- Reports to: Minister for Foreign Affairs
- Residence: Inkognitogata 27 (Note: The ambassador's residence is at the same location as the chancery.)
- Seat: Oslo, Norway
- Appointer: Government of Sweden
- Term length: No fixed term
- Inaugural holder: Ernst Günther
- Formation: 1905
- Website: Swedish Embassy, Oslo

The Ambassador of Sweden to Norway (known formally as the Ambassador of the Kingdom of Sweden to the Kingdom of Norway) is the official representative of the government of Sweden to the monarch and government of Norway.

== History ==
Sweden's first minister in Norway, Ernst Günther, was appointed in November 1905 after the dissolution of the union between Norway and Sweden in June of the same year. The consulate general established for Norway after the dissolution of the union was entrusted to the King in Council's minister in Norway.

In 1947, an agreement was reached between the Swedish and Norwegian governments on the mutual elevation of the respective countries' legations to embassies. The diplomatic rank was thereafter changed to ambassador instead of envoy extraordinary and minister plenipotentiary. On 21 September of the same year, Baron Johan Beck-Friis took office as Sweden's first ambassador in modern times.

== List of representatives ==
Name	Period	Title	Notes	Ref
Ernst Günther	29 November 1905 – 1908	Envoy extraordinary and minister plenipotentiary	Also consul general. (Note: Acting consul general from 29 November 1905, regular from 16 June 1906 to 17 June 1908.)	
Ivan Danielsson	1908–1910	Chargé d'affaires ad interim		
Gustaf Falkenberg	17 June 1908 – 1913	Envoy	Also consul general. (Note: Consul general for Norway from 17 June 1908 to 28 November 1913.)	
Evert Åkerhielm	1910–1910	Chargé d'affaires ad interim		
Fredrik Ramel	28 November 1913 – 1923	Envoy	Also consul general. (Note: Consul general for Norway from 28 November 1913.)	
Claës Bonde	9 March 1917 – 1 June 1918	Chargé d'affaires ad interim		
Patrik Reuterswärd	1918–1918	Chargé d'affaires ad interim		
Torvald Höjer	28 February 1923 – 30 October 1937	Envoy		
Christian Günther	26 November 1937 – 1939	Envoy		
Johan Beck-Friis	1940 – 20 September 1947	Envoy		
Johan Beck-Friis	21 September 1947 – 1950	Ambassador		
Hans W:son Ahlmann	1950–1956	Ambassador		
Rolf Edberg	1956–1967	Ambassador		
Dick Hichens-Bergström	1968–1973	Ambassador		
Yngve Möller	1973–1978	Ambassador		
Love Kellberg	1978–1987	Ambassador		
Axel Edelstam	1987–1989	Ambassador		
Lennart Bodström	1989–1993	Ambassador		
Kjell Anneling	1993–1997	Ambassador		
Magnus Vahlquist	1997–2002	Ambassador		
Mats Ringborg	2002–2006	Ambassador		
Michael Sahlin	2007–2010	Ambassador		
Ingrid Hjelt af Trolle	2010–2014	Ambassador		
Axel Wernhoff	2014–2018	Ambassador		
Krister Bringéus	November 2018 – 2020	Ambassador		
Cecilia Björner	January 2021 – 2024	Ambassador		
Mikael Eriksson	2024–present	Ambassador		

== See also ==
- Norway–Sweden relations
- Embassy of Sweden, Oslo
