= Kjell Anneling =

Swedish diplomat (born 1938)

- Born: Kjell Yngve Andersson; 20 May 1938 (age 88); Gothenburg, Sweden
- Education: Gothenburg School of Business, Economics and Law
- Occupation: Diplomat
- Years active: 1963–2006
- Spouse: Birgit Hahn (m. 1965)

Kjell Yngve Anneling, né Andersson (born 20 May 1938) is a retired Swedish diplomat. Anneling’s more than 40-year diplomatic career began in 1963 as an attaché at the Ministry for Foreign Affairs, with early postings in Oslo, Kinshasa, and Athens, and later service as counsellor and chargé d’affaires in Dhaka and Manila. He went on to serve as minister in Oslo, director at the Ministry, and ambassador to New Zealand with accreditation to Fiji, Tonga, and Western Samoa. From 1990 to 1993 he was director-general for administrative affairs, followed by appointments as ambassador to Norway and later to China, Mongolia, and North Korea, where he oversaw major trade initiatives and high-level diplomatic exchanges. He subsequently coordinated Sweden’s trade and investment promotion, served as Consul General in New York City, and was appointed to government inquiries on tourism promotion and Swedish-language education abroad. From 2010 to 2019, he chaired the Swedish–Norwegian Association.

== Early life ==
Anneling was born on 20 May 1938 in Gothenburg, Sweden, the son of Carl Andersson and his wife Ingeborg (née Hallberg). He received a civilekonom degree from Gothenburg School of Business, Economics and Law in 1963.

== Career ==
Anneling began his diplomatic career in 1963 as an attaché at the Ministry for Foreign Affairs. The following year he was posted to Oslo, and in 1965 he was appointed second secretary, first in Stockholm and later that year in Kinshasa. Returning to the Ministry in 1968, he served as administrative officer (kanslisekreterare), and in 1971 became desk officer (departementssekreterare). Two years later, he was posted to Athens as first secretary, followed in 1975 by an assignment as counsellor and chargé d’affaires ad interim in Dhaka. In 1977, he took on the same role in Manila.

In 1979, Anneling became minister at the Swedish Embassy in Oslo, and in 1983 he returned to Stockholm as a director at the Ministry for Foreign Affairs. Four years later, he was appointed ambassador to New Zealand, based in Wellington, with concurrent accreditation to Fiji, Tonga, and Western Samoa. His tenure coincided with the Fijian coups d'état of May and September 1987, as well as the high-profile disappearance of Swedish nationals Urban Höglin and Heidi Paakkonen in New Zealand in 1989, later revealed to be a case of murder. From 1990 to 1993, he served as director-general for administrative affairs (expeditionschef) at the Ministry, overseeing the administrative leadership of Sweden’s foreign service. In November 1990, he was also appointed chair of the Ministry’s admissions board.

Appointed ambassador to Norway in 1993, he returned to the region he had known early in his career. In 1997, he became ambassador to China, with additional accreditation to Mongolia and North Korea. During his posting, he organised the landmark Swedish exhibition in Shanghai in March 1999, the largest and most comprehensive Swedish export showcase to date, with a budget of 40 million kronor and some 500 Swedish participants. In North Korea, his letter of credence was addressed to Kim Il Sung, who had been dead for several years. In 2001, during a state visit by Swedish Prime Minister Göran Persson in his capacity as President of the European Council, Anneling met North Korean leader Kim Jong Il and joined him for lunch.

In 2002, he succeeded Mikael Lindström as chief coordinator for the foreign service’s trade and investment promotion activities. The following year, on 27 May 2003, he was appointed expert in a government inquiry reviewing the organisation, role, and effectiveness of Sweden’s tourism promotion.

On 8 July 2004, Anneling was named Consul General in New York City. Initially appointed on a temporary basis until the year’s end, he remained in the post until 2006, when he was succeeded by Ulf Hjertonsson. In April that same year, he was appointed expert in a government inquiry into support for Swedish-language education abroad.

From 2010 to 2019, Anneling served as chair of the Swedish-Norwegian Association.

== Personal life ==
In 1965, Anneling married Birgit Hahn (born 1937), the daughter of Commander Klaus Friedrich Hahn and Margit (née Walter).

One son was born on 10 April 1969 at Allmänna BB in Stockholm.

== Awards and decorations ==
- (Norway) Grand Cross of the Royal Norwegian Order of Merit (1997)
- (Norway) Commander of the Order of St. Olav (1983)

Diplomatic posts
Preceded by Christer Sylvén	Ambassador of Sweden to New Zealand; 1987–1990	Succeeded by Hans Andén
Preceded by Christer Sylvén	Ambassador of Sweden to the Fiji; 1987–1990	Succeeded by Hans Andén
Preceded by Christer Sylvén	Ambassador of Sweden to Tonga; 1987–1990	Succeeded by Hans Andén
Preceded by Christer Sylvén	Ambassador of Sweden to Western Samoa; 1987–1990	Succeeded by Hans Andén
Preceded by Lennart Bodström	Ambassador of Sweden to Norway; 1993–1997	Succeeded by Magnus Vahlquist
Preceded by Sven Linder	Ambassador of Sweden to China; 1997–2002	Succeeded by Börje Ljunggren
Preceded by Sven Linder	Ambassador of Sweden to Mongolia; 1997–2002	Succeeded by Börje Ljunggren
Preceded by Sven Linder	Ambassador of Sweden to North Korea; 1997–2002	Succeeded by Paul Beijer
Preceded by Olle Wästberg	Consul general of Sweden to New York City; 2004–2006	Succeeded by Ulf Hjertonsson
