= Rifled breech loader =

Class of artillery

A rifled breech loader (RBL) is an artillery piece which, unlike the smoothbore cannon and rifled muzzle loader which preceded it, has rifling in the barrel and is loaded from the breech at the rear of the gun.

The spin imparted by the gun's rifling gives projectiles directional stability and increased range. Loading from the rear of the gun leaves the crew less exposed to enemy fire, allows smaller gun emplacements or turrets, and allows a faster rate of fire.

These rapidly improving breech systems and the powerful new guns they facilitated led to an arms race in fortification and ironclad warship design that led to the battleship class of HMS Dreadnought and continued until the start of World War I.

== Overview ==
The major problem to be solved with breechloading artillery was obturation: the sealing of the breech after firing to ensure that none of the gases generated by the burning of the propellant (initially gunpowder) escaped rearwards through the breech. This was both a safety issue and one of gun performance – all the propellant gas was needed to accelerate the projectile along the barrel.

The second problem was speed of operation – how to close the breech before firing and open it after firing as quickly as possible consistent with safety.

Two solutions were developed more or less in parallel, the "screw breech" block and "sliding wedge" or "sliding block".

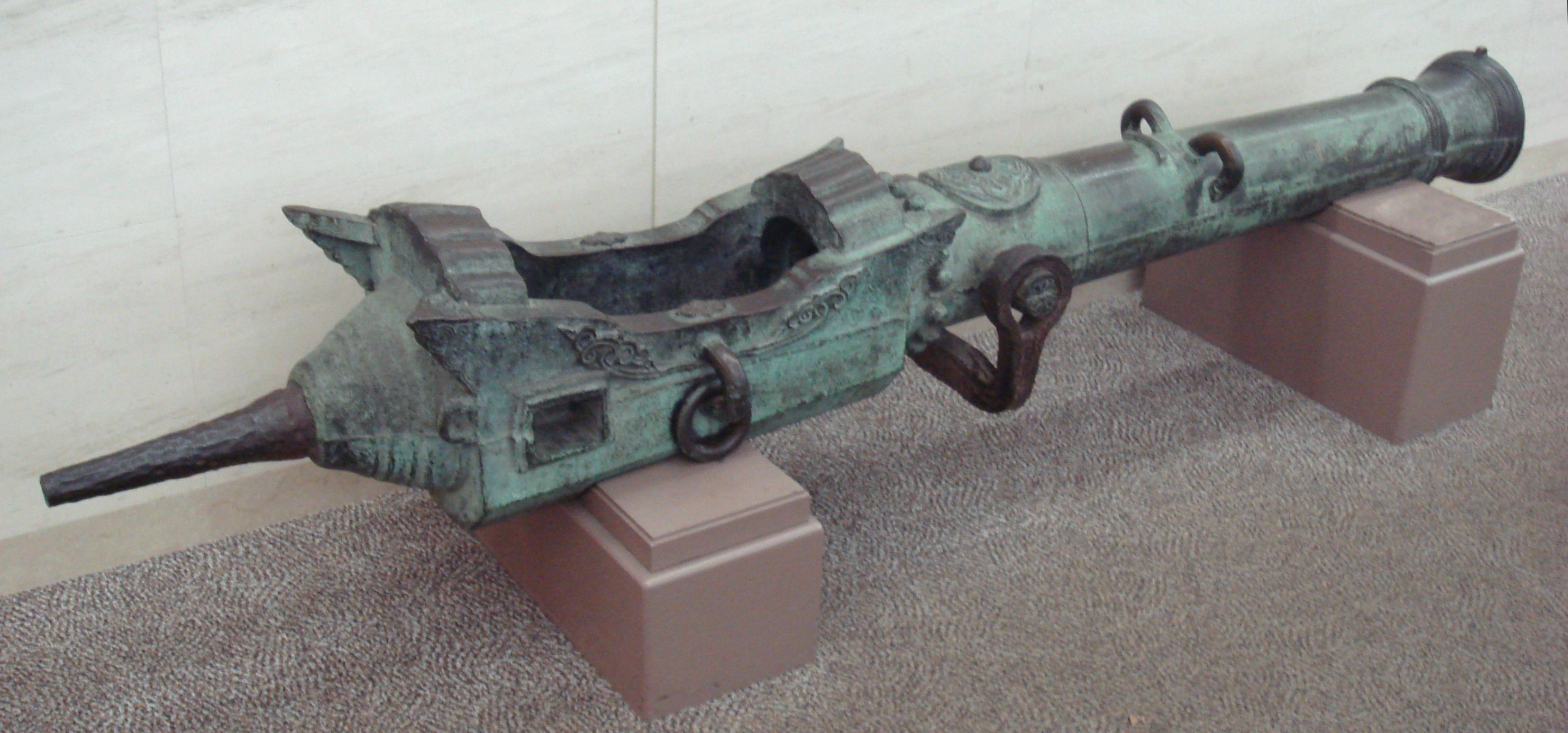
A Japanese swivel breech-loading gun of the time of Oda Nobunaga, 16th century.

At the time of development of the first modern breechloaders in the mid-19th century, gunpowder propellant charges for artillery were typically loaded in cloth bags, which combusted totally on firing. Hence, unlike with a metal rifle cartridge, the breech mechanism itself somehow needed to provide obturation.

The early "screw" mechanisms for sealing the breech consisted of threaded blocks which were screwed tightly into the breech after loading, but the threads themselves were insufficient to provide a gas-tight seal. This was further complicated by the need to screw and unscrew the breech as quickly as possible; this was met by the "interrupted thread" breech block, where the block circumference was alternately threaded and left unthreaded at a slightly smaller diameter to allow the whole block to be fully inserted and rotated a fraction to lock it. Hence if the block circumference was divided into two sets of threads and gaps, the block only needed to be rotated ¼ turn to lock it instead of several turns. The tradeoff was that only ½ the block's circumference was threaded, reducing the security accordingly.

The other possibility of sealing the breech was to enclose the propellant charge in a metal cartridge case which expanded on firing and hence sealed the breech, leaving the breech-block merely needing to lock the cartridge case in place. This was more easily accomplished by sliding the block in behind the cartridge case through a vertical or horizontal slot cut through the rear of the breech : the "sliding wedge" or "sliding block" breech.

== History ==
=== Early breechloaders ===
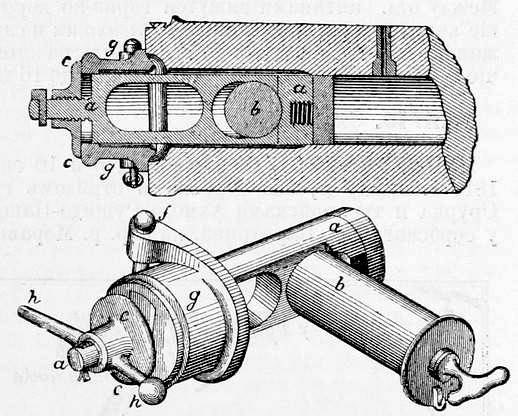
Wahrendorff breech

The very first cannons of the Middle Ages were breech loaded, with gunpowder and shot contained in pots dropped at the back of the barrel, but the poor seals made them dangerous, and they wore quickly and could not be scaled to larger weapons. Until the 19th century, mainly muzzle-loaders were used.

In 1837, Martin von Wahrendorff patented a design for a breech-loader with a cylindrical breech plug secured by a horizontal wedge; it was adopted by Sweden in 1854. Independently, Giovanni Cavalli first proposed a breech-loader gun in 1832 to the Sardinian Army, and first tested such a gun in 1845.

=== Armstrong screw breech ===
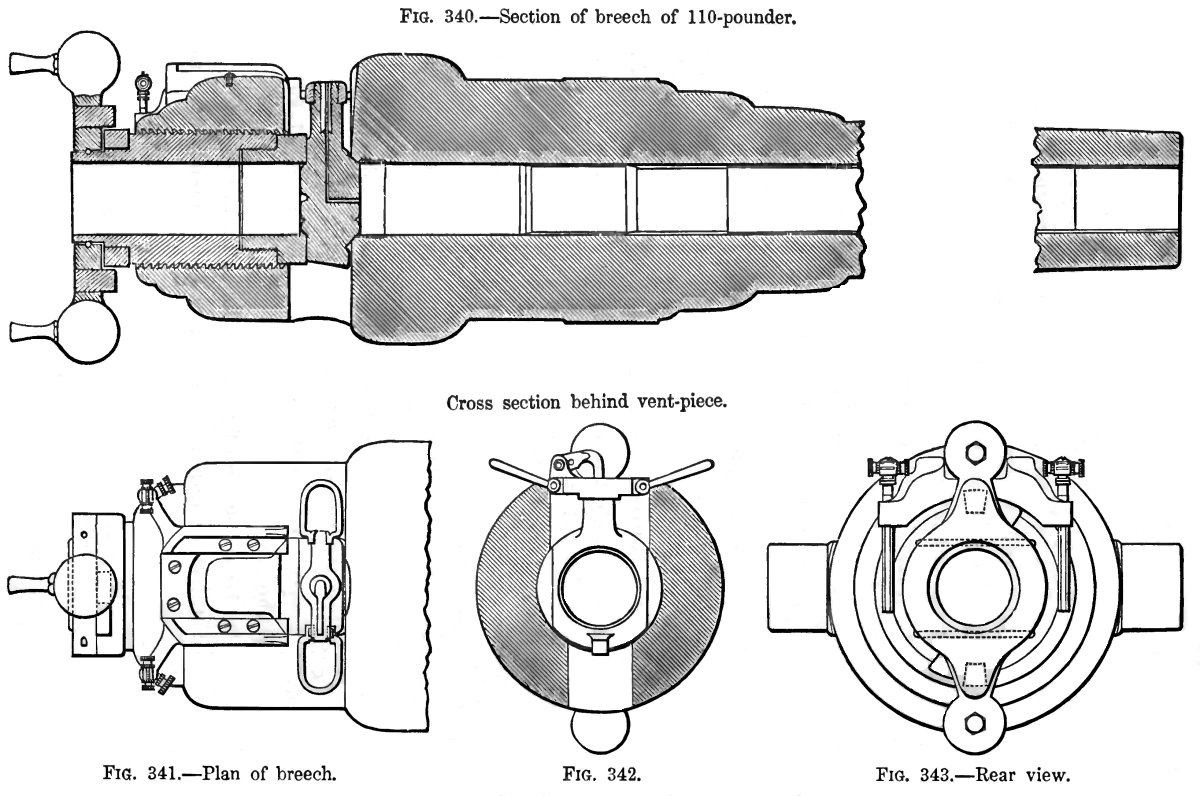
Armstrong gun screw breech.

Advances in metallurgy in the industrial era allowed for the construction of rifled breech-loading guns that could fire at a much greater muzzle velocity. After the British artillery was shown up in the Crimean War as having barely changed since the Napoleonic Wars the industrialist William Armstrong was awarded a contract by the government to design a new piece of artillery. Production started in 1855 at the Elswick Ordnance Company and the Royal Arsenal at Woolwich.

His "Armstrong screw" breech involved loading the shell and gunpowder propellant charge in a cloth bag through the hollow breech screw, lowering a heavy block into a slot behind the powder chamber and screwing the breech screw tightly against the block to lock it in place. A degree of obturation was achieved via a cup on the face of the block being forced into a recessed ring on the chamber face. The system was in effect a vertical sliding block such as later used by Krupp in both horizontal and vertical form, with the crucial difference that Armstrong failed to make the progression to loading the powder charge in a metal cartridge, with the result that complete obturation was impossible.

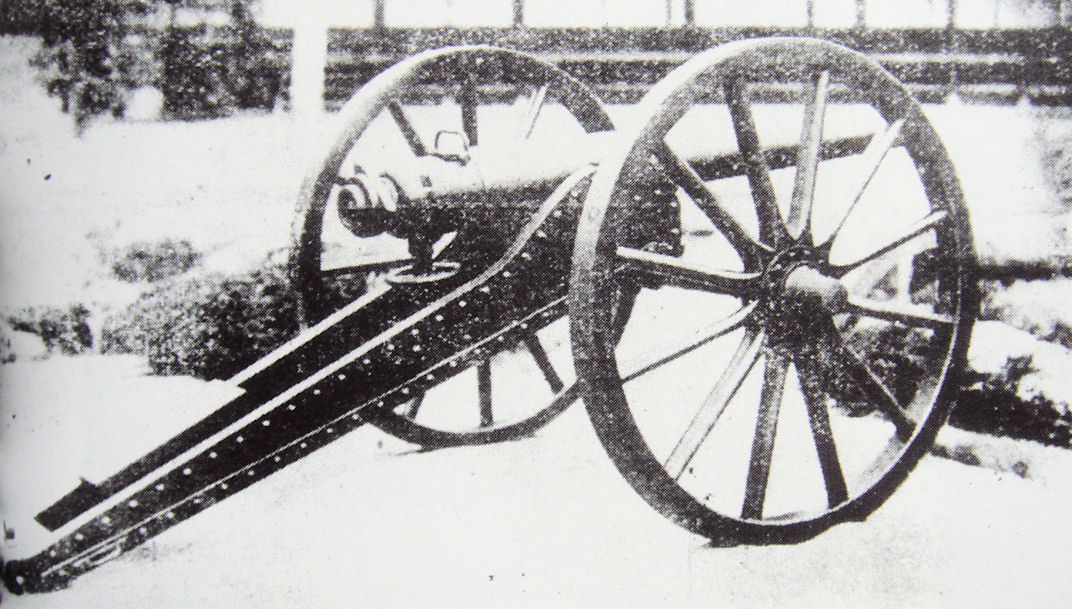
The Armstrong gun was a pivotal development for modern artillery as the first practical rifled breech loader. Pictured, deployed by Japan during the Boshin War (1868–69).

Whatever obturation that was achieved relied on manual labour rather than the power of the gun's firing, and was hence both uncertain, based on an unsound principle and unsuited to large guns. Armstrong screw-breech guns were initially adopted by the British Army and Royal Navy, but concerns about limited armour penetration of the shells due to limited maximum velocity, safety concerns with the breech blocks blowing out of guns, and higher skill levels demanded of gunners led the British Government to revert to rifled muzzle-loaders from 1865 to 1880, when Britain finally deployed reliable screw breech mechanisms.

The Imperial Japanese Army used Armstrong cannon during the Boshin War to devastate the Aizu castle town and force its inhabitants to surrender quickly, and British Armstrong light field guns proved deadly against Chinese forces in the Second Opium War. However, the British Army and Navy preferred to revert to muzzle-loaders until larger high-powered breech-loaders with secure obturation systems that were relatively simple to operate were developed.

=== Broadwell ring ===
American engineer Lewis Wells Broadwell who worked as sales agent for the Gatling Gun Company in Europe replaced a papier-mache obturating cup in bag-loaded RBLs with a metallic gas ring and patented his invention in 1861, later perfecting it in 1864 and 1866; most countries paid royalties to Broadwell for the design, but in Germany the Krupp company stole it and used it for free.

=== French efforts ===
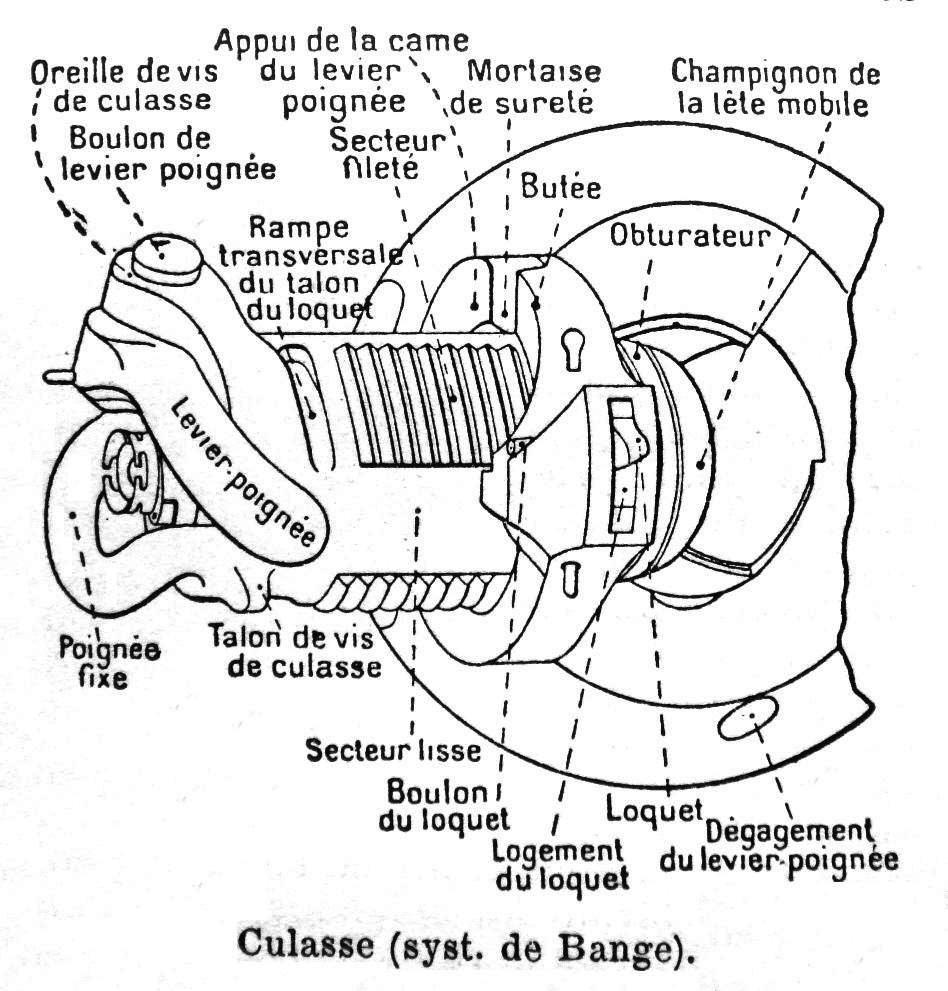
de Bange interrupted screw breech.

In the meantime the French persevered with trying to develop breechloaders which combined faster loading than muzzle-loaders, high power, safety and solved the problem of obturation. The Lahitolle 95 mm cannon of 1875 with an interrupted screw breech met the first three requirements to a great extent and partially solved the obturation problem.

Finally the de Bange system introduced in 1877 solved the obturation problem with an asbestos pad impregnated with grease which expanded and sealed the breech on firing. The de Bange system formed the obturation system for all subsequent screw breeches to the present day. Britain adopted the de Bange breech when it returned to breechloaders in the early 1880s after some initial experiments with the inferior "Armstrong cup" obturation system.

Britain, France, and the United States preferred screw breeches for most calibres, but the major drawback of the de Bange interrupted screw as first implemented was that only half of the circumference of the breech block could be threaded, and hence it needed to be fairly long to achieve safe locking of the breech, which required three separate motions to open after firing; rotate to unscrew, retract the screw and swing to the side. Loading required the 3 operations in reverse. This was hence termed a "three motion block" and was slow to operate.

=== Welin breech block ===
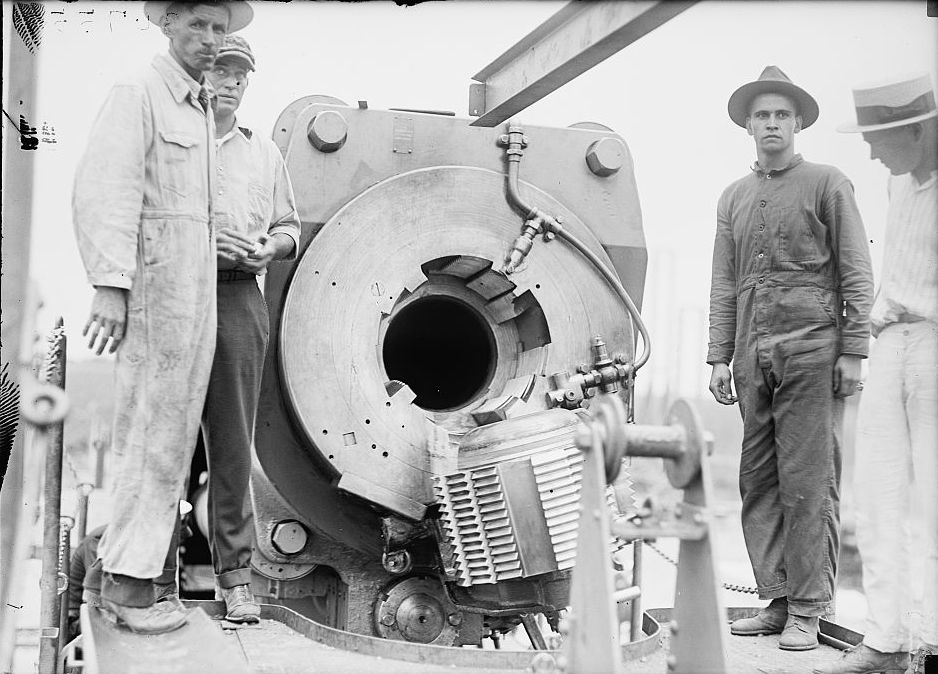
Welin breech with 4 sets of 3 thread steps.

While working as a weapons designer for Thorsten Nordenfelt in London, Axel Welin solved this problem in 1889–1890 with his stepped interrupted screw Welin breech block. This had threads in sets of steps of increasing diameter so that instead of only half of the screw being threaded, the fraction threaded was number of steps / (1 + number of steps): i.e. if the block of a large gun had four steps of threads, 80% of the screw was threaded, allowing a much shorter screw and hence breech block. This allowed the block to be unscrewed and swung out in two motions – the "two motion interrupted screw" breech.

=== Bofors ogival screw ===
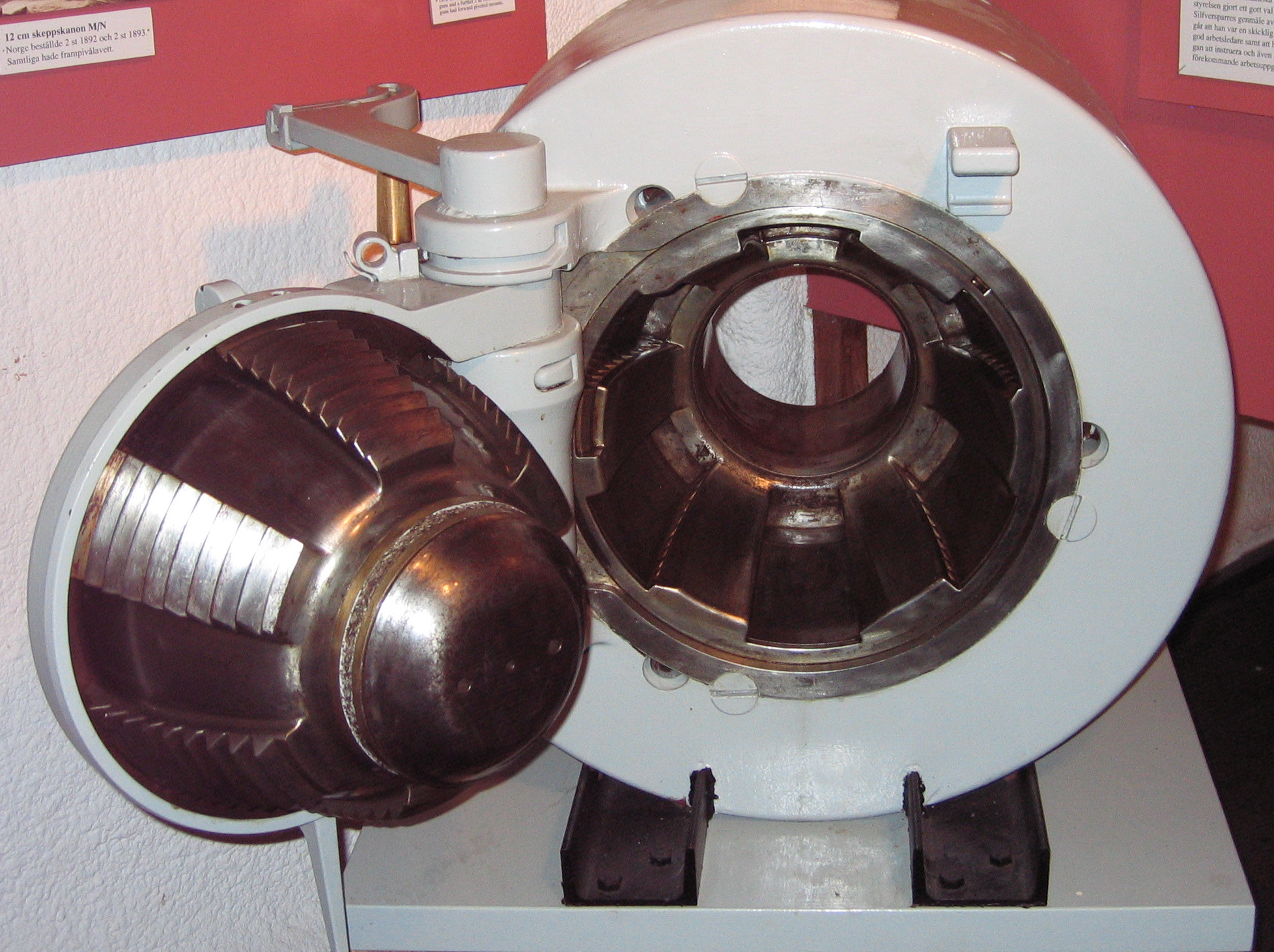
Bofors ogival screw breech

Also in the early 1890s, Arent Silfversparre of Bofors invented an ogival screw breech, similar to the Armstrong model in the way it eliminated the need to withdraw the screw before swinging it to the side. Bofors continued to use this in medium artillery into the 20th century. The Elswick conical screw breech is very similar in concept.

=== The sliding block ===
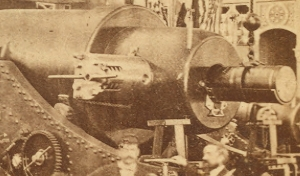
Krupp horizontal sliding block (left side) breech on large gun exhibited at the Centennial Exhibition, Philadelphia, 1876.

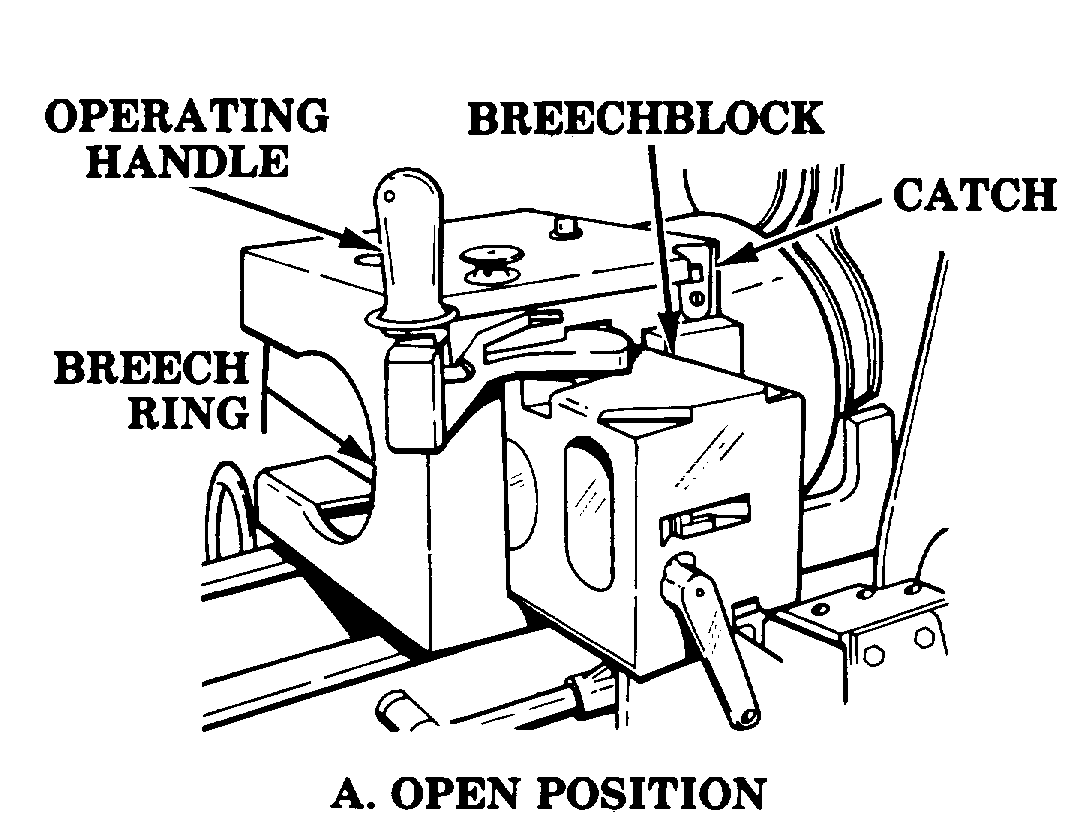
Diagram of the horizontal sliding wedge.

The German company Krupp in contrast, adopted "Horizontal sliding block" breeches, rather than screw breeches, for all artillery calibres up to 16 in (410 mm) naval guns. This was similar in some ways to the original "Armstrong screw"; the shot and powder cartridge were inserted through the open rear end of the breech into the gun bore, and a steel block was slid home into a horizontal slot cut through the breech to close the rear end of the breech.

However, unlike Armstrong, Krupp loaded the powder propellant in a metal cartridge case much like a large rifle cartridge, which expanded against the chamber wall on firing and effectively sealed the breech. The sliding block, in both horizontal and vertical forms, and metal cartridge case continued to be the preferred German breech system until after World War II (e.g. 7.5 cm Pak 40), and is still used by some modern artillery.

=== Quickfiring guns ===
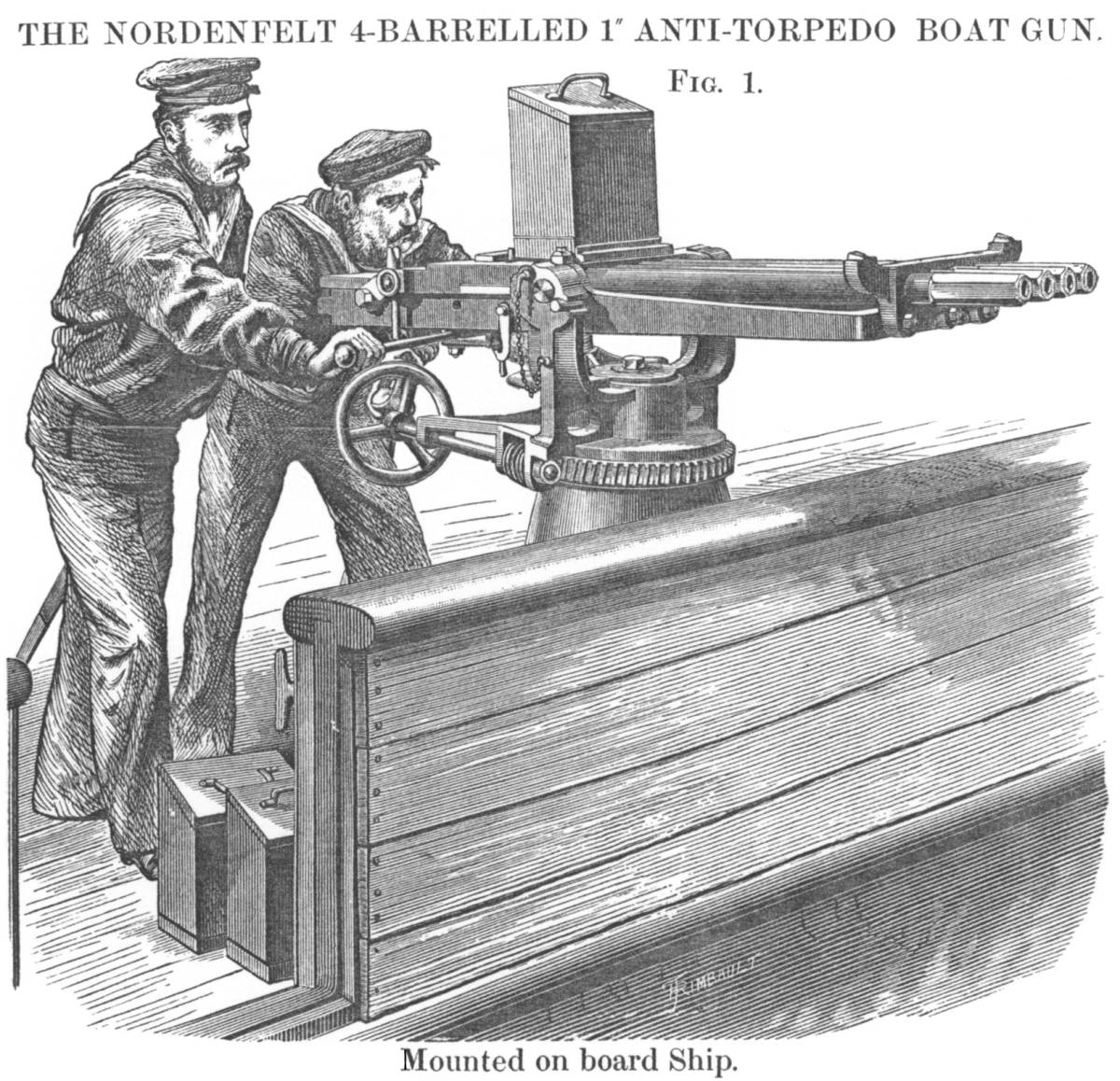
Woodcut depicting Royal Navy gunners in action with the 1-inch Nordenfelt gun, the first practical QF gun.

The first quick-firing light gun was the 1-inch Nordenfelt gun, built in Britain from 1880. The gun was expressly designed to defend larger warships against the new small fast-moving torpedo boats in the late 1870s to the early 1880s and was an enlarged version of the successful rifle-calibre Nordenfelt hand-cranked "machine gun" designed by Helge Palmcrantz. The gun fired a solid steel bullet with hardened tip and brass jacket.

It was superseded for anti-torpedo boat defence in the mid-1880s by the new generation of Hotchkiss and Nordenfelt "QF" guns of 47-mm and 57-mm calibre firing exploding "common pointed" shells weighing 3–6 lb (1.4–2.7 kg).

The French firm Hotchkiss produced the QF 3 pounder as a light 47-mm naval gun from 1886. The gun was ideal for defending against small fast vessels such as torpedo boats and was immediately adopted by the RN as the "Ordnance QF 3 pounder Hotchkiss". It was built under licence by Elswick Ordnance Company.

Both the Hotchkiss and Nordenfelt guns loaded ammunition as a single cartridge with projectile, cartridge case and primer in a single unit. The cartridge case sealed the breech on firing and a vertical sliding wedge (block) locked it in place. These new guns incorporated recoil control devices which facilitated consistency of aim, allowed single-motion loading and could be fired as soon as the cartridge was inserted, and then ejected it after firing, these properties denoting a "quick-firing" gun. This set a new standard for artillery, and made firing cycles measured in seconds rather than minutes possible.

Britain used brass cartridge cases for all calibres up to 6 inches in the late 1880s and early 1890s. However, British-designed quickfiring ("QF" in British terminology, which became synonymous with charges in metal cartridge cases) continued to use screw breech blocks, but with their function merely to lock the cartridge in place rather than provide obturation. The powerful backward force generated by 6-inch QF guns still required a strongly seated breech screw with as much thread as possible. However, a basic interrupted-thread screw sufficiently long enough to have enough thread to secure the cartridge on firing still required three separate motions to operate – rotate, withdraw, swing aside after firing, and repeated in reverse before firing.

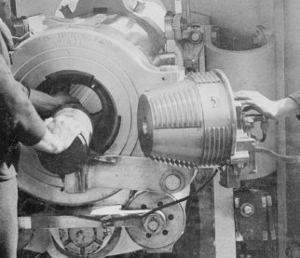
Elswick coned interrupted screw breech of QF 6-inch naval gun.

Elswick Ordnance Company (Armstrong's ordnance arm) developed a coned version of the interrupted-thread screw, with a decreasing rather than constant diameter towards the front. This eliminated the second "withdrawal" motion, with just two motions now necessary, rotate and swing aside. This proved short-lived, with Britain adopting charges in bags using the Welin stepped interrupted screw for all guns 5 in (130 mm) and up within several years of it becoming available.

== See also ==
- Armstrong Gun
- Anglo-German naval arms race
