= Herman Hurmevaara =

Finnish politician

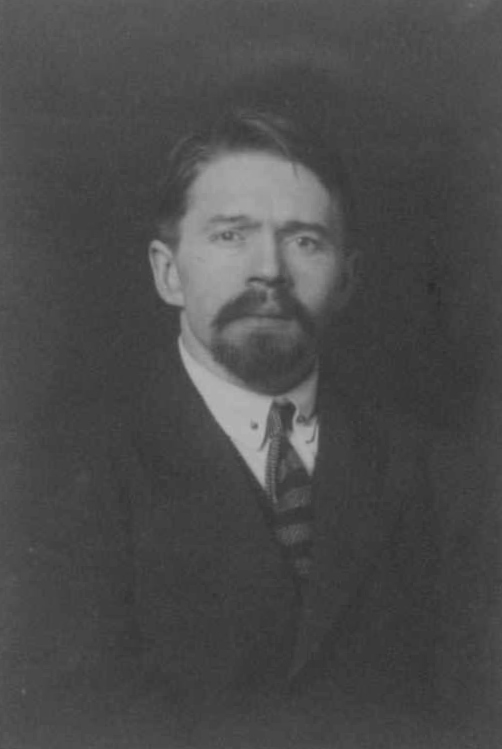
Herman Hurmevaara in the 1910s

Herman Hurmevaara (Russian Герман Вильгельмович Хурмеваара, German Vilgelmovich Khurmevaara; 19 February 1886 – 16 February 1938) was a Finnish Social Democratic Party of Finland Member of Parliament. He was born in Kiuruvesi, and served in the Parliament of Finland from 1917 to 1919. In the 1920s, he lived in Sweden. In 1930, he was exiled from Sweden, and with his family he moved to the Soviet Union. During the Great Purge, Hurmevaara was arrested on charges of espionage and imprisoned on December 23, 1937. He was later sentenced to death and executed by firing squad in Petrozavodsk. After the death of Joseph Stalin, he was rehabilitated in 1956.

== Youth and the Civil War ==
Born in Kalliokylä in Kiuruvesi, Herman Hurmevaara's parents were farmhand Abram Vilhelm Pietikäinen (1837-1889) and Saara Kokkonen (1846-1914). After attending public school, he worked as a bricklayer in Oulu from 1900 to 1902 and in Helsinki from 1902.

During the Great Strike, Hurmevaara belonged to the Helsinki red guard company that guarded the railway station. In the years 1906-1909, he worked as a traveling speaker of the Social Democratic Party and since 1910 as the district secretary and housekeeper of the Social Democratic District of Uusimaa. Hurmevaara was also a member of Helsinki's social democratic municipal committee.

After the February revolution, in the summer of 1917, the banking council of the parliament elected Hurmevaara as the deputy auditor of the Bank of Finland. In the parliamentary elections of the same autumn, he was elected as a Member of Parliament. After the start of the Finnish Civil War, Hurmevaara became a member of the Communist Party of Finland or SKP. He was appointed to a position corresponding to the governor of Uusimaa county, in addition to serving in the financial affairs department of the people's delegation in the early days of February. After the people's delegation withdrew to Vyborg at the beginning of April, Hurmevaara was elected to the committee sent to St. Petersburg, which took care of the evacuation of the Reds fleeing to Soviet Russia.

== As a refugee in Sweden ==
In October 1918, Hurmevaara moved to Sweden as a political refugee. According to Arvo Tuominen, Hurmevaara, who acted as the committee's housekeeper, took with him funds from the Bank of Finland, which were used to finance the underground activities of Finnish communists. The committee soon turned into the Stockholm office, where he worked until 1920. Hurmevaara was also the editor of the magazine Viesti and lectured at agitation courses led by Kullervo Manner and Yrjö Sirola.

In the SKP, he used the pseudonym "Hansson". Hurmevaara belonged to the staff of the Swedish battalion of the Finnish Red Guard, which was revealed in 1921 and he was a suspect in the case of treason brought against the communists.

From 1921, Hurmevaara served as a representative of the Karelian Working People's Commune and later as a commercial representative of the Karelia ASNT. They also tried to get him official ambassador status, but Sweden did not agree to it.

Hurmevaara, who was in the country with refugee status, did not have a Finnish passport, so in 1922 he took Soviet citizenship in order to visit the country. In 1927, Hurmevaara was dismissed from his duties, after which he was hired as an archivist for the communist newspaper Folkets Dagblad Politiken. When the Swedish Communist Party broke up, Hurmevaara supported the minority led by Hugo Sillén, loyal to the Comintern and to Joseph Stalin in his intra-party dispute with Nikolai Bukharin. During party disputes, he was suspected of participating behind the scenes under the pseudonym "Ex. R.” (Executivens representative), which was also allegedly used by the trio formed by Hurmevaara, Kullervo Manner and Allan Wallenius. In his interview with Nya Dagligt Allehanda, Hurmevaara denied that he was "Ex. R.”.

== Exile in the Soviet Union ==
Hurmevaara attracted the attention of the authorities in the fall of 1929 in connection with the so-called "kapsäkki affair", when Kullervo Manner's suitcase containing his letters was also found in the possession of Comintern agent Leon Purman. Hurmevaara's activities were adjudged to endanger Sweden's security and he was advised to leave the country by the deadline. Hurmevaara did not follow the order, but appealed based on his family connections, because he did not think he could go to a foreign country with his children.

At the beginning of December, Hurmevaara was ordered to be deported, but he appealed the decision. A petition drawn up on his behalf stated that Hurmevaara is a political refugee who faces a prison sentence of years in Finland, and that he should not be deported until the matter is thoroughly investigated. Among the signatories were the chairman of the Social Democrats Per Albin Hansson, former prime ministers Carl Gustaf Ekman and Rickard Sandler, former social minister Gustav Möller, former finance minister Ernst Wigforss, MP Arthur Engberg, Stockholm mayor Carl Lindhagen, Dagens Nyheter editor-in-chief Sten Dehlgren, lieutenant colonel Karl-Axel Bratt and authors Ludvig Nordström and Elin Wägner. The high command's office, which interrogated Hurmeavaara, issued a statement in mid-March, which stated that he had cooperated with foreign parties aiming to subvert the Swedish social order, and ordered his deportation. Carl Lindhagen made an interlocutory question about the matter in the Riksdag, but the government carried out the deportation and Hurmevaara finally traveled with his family to the Soviet Union in April 1930.

After arriving in the Soviet Union, Hurmevaara worked in Moscow from 1930 to 1932 as an administrator of the International Red Aid, handling, among other things, the affairs of the Nordic countries. In 1933 he went to work for the Finnish section of the Comintern. In 1933, on Edvard Gylling's recommendation, Hurmevaara moved to Petrozavodsk, where he initially worked at the Statistics Office and from 1936 as a proofreader for Kustannusliike Kirja.

Hurmevaara was expelled from the Communist Party of Norway in September 1937 for "social democratism" and "national fanaticism", and was imprisoned in December 1937 on charges of counter-revolutionary espionage. He was sentenced to death and executed on February 16, 1938 near Petroskoi. Hurmevaara was rehabilitated after J.V. Stalin's death in 1956.

== Family ==
Herman Hurmevaara's spouse was Anna Sigrid Paunula (b. 1887), born in Orivede, whom he married in 1914. Among other things, Anna Hurmevaara worked as the treasurer of the ironers' professional department of the Helsinki Workers' Association. The couple had two children.

Vappu Hurmevaara (1915-1993), who studied at the Lenin School, was spared Stalin's persecution after being sent by Otto Wille Kuusinen to the SKP's Stockholm office in July 1937. Later Hurmevaara worked in the Comintern. Aino Hurmevaara (1925-1999) was a linguist and literary researcher at the University of Petrozavodsk who translated the Kalevala into Russian together with Nikolai Gippiev.

== Sources ==
- Herman Hurmevaara. Edustajamatrikkeli. Kansanedustajat 1907 –. Eduskunta (Parliament of Finland). (in Finnish)
- "KASNT:n NKVD:n vuosina 1937–1938 rankaisemien Suomen Eduskunnan entisten jäsenten luettelo". Valtioelinten virallinen palvelin (in Finnish). Petroskoi: Karjalan tasavalta. 2 December 1998.
