= List of ambassadors of Sweden to the Federated States of Micronesia =

Ambassador of Sweden to the Federated States of Micronesia
- Lesser coat of arms of the Kingdom of Sweden

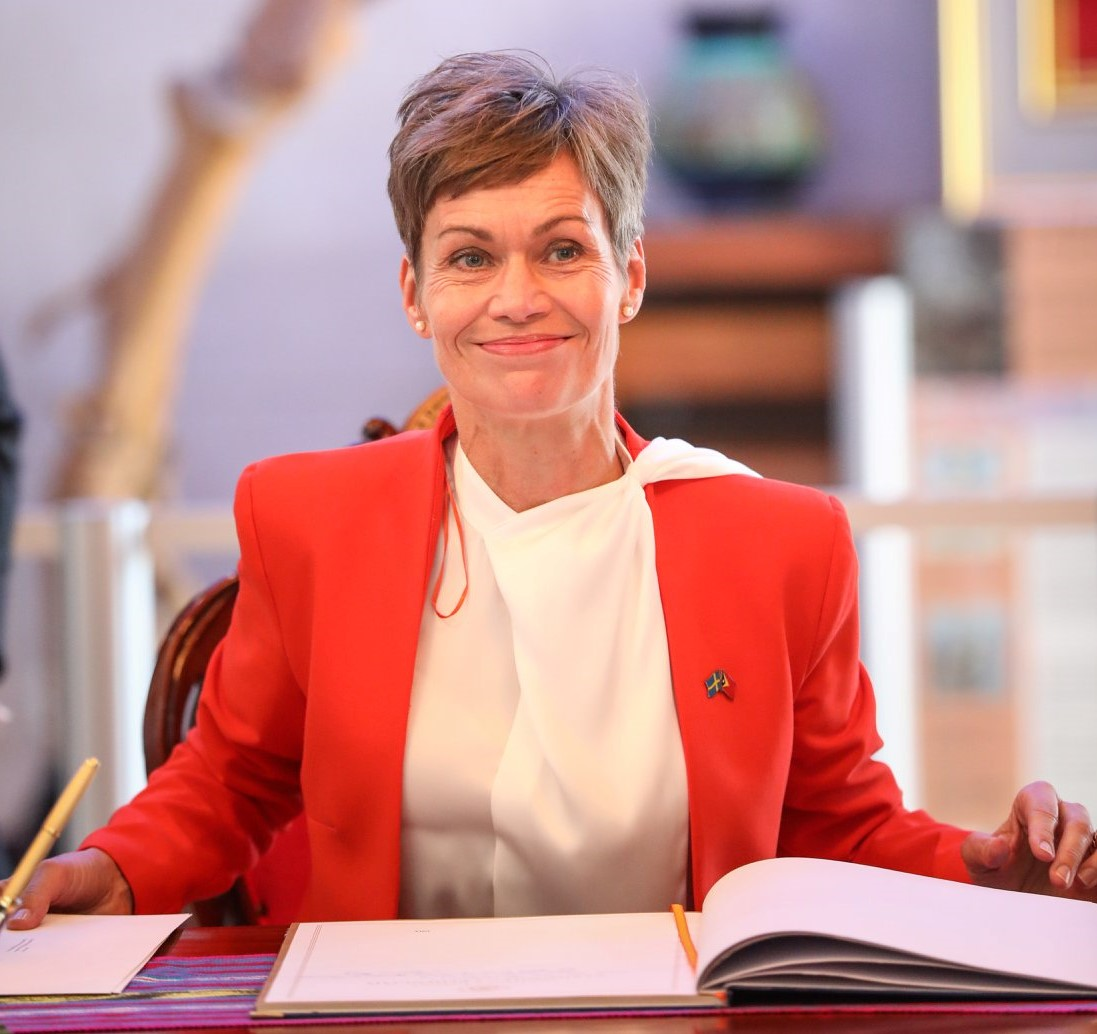
- Incumbent; Marina Berg since 2025
- Ministry for Foreign Affairs
- Style: His or Her Excellency (formal); Mr. or Madam Ambassador (informal)
- Reports to: Minister for Foreign Affairs
- Seat: Stockholm, Sweden (Note: Since 2025, the Swedish ambassador to the Federated States of Micronesia is based in Stockholm, Sweden.)
- Appointer: Government of Sweden
- Term length: No fixed term
- Inaugural holder: Magnus Vahlquist
- Formation: 1995

The Ambassador of Sweden to the Federated States of Micronesia (known formally as the Ambassador of the Kingdom of Sweden to the Federated States of Micronesia) is the official representative of the government of Sweden to the president of the Federated States of Micronesia and government of the Federated States of Micronesia. Since Sweden does not have an embassy in Palikir, Sweden's ambassador to the Federated States of Micronesia is based in Stockholm, Sweden.

== History ==
On 5 September 1991, Sweden recognized the Federated States of Micronesia as an independent state. The background was that the Federated States of Micronesia sought admission as a member of the United Nations.

The Swedish government decided on 5 December 1991 to enter into an agreement on the establishment of diplomatic relations with the Federated States of Micronesia through an exchange of notes. The agreement with the Federated States of Micronesia on the establishment of diplomatic relations was signed in New York City on 17 December 1991 and 26 August 1992. The agreement entered into force on 26 August 1992.

In 1995, a Swedish ambassador was accredited for the first time in the capital of the Federated States of Micronesia, Palikir. Between 1995 and 2024, Sweden's ambassador in Tokyo was concurrently accredited to Palikir.

As of 2025, the post of Swedish ambassador to the Federated States of Micronesia is held by a Stockholm-based ambassador-at-large, who is also ambassador to 10 other countries in Oceania.

== List of representatives ==
Name	Period	Title	Resident / Concurrent accreditation	Notes	Presented credentials	Ref
Magnus Vahlquist	1995–1997	Ambassador	Resident in Tokyo			
Krister Kumlin	1997–2002	Ambassador	Resident in Tokyo			
Mikael Lindström	2002–2006	Ambassador	Resident in Tokyo			
Stefan Noreén	2006–2011	Ambassador	Resident in Tokyo			
Lars Vargö	2011–2014	Ambassador	Resident in Tokyo		June 2012	
?	2014–2019	Ambassador				
Pereric Högberg	2019–2024	Ambassador	Resident in Tokyo		21 February 2024	
Marina Berg	2025–present	Ambassador	Resident in Stockholm			
