= Magnus Vahlquist =

Swedish diplomat (born 1938)

- Born: Alf Magnus Vahlquist; 24 May 1938 (age 88); Motala, Sweden
- Education: Uppsala University
- Occupation: Diplomat
- Years active: 1962–2011
- Spouse: Märta Christina Trana (m. 1963)

Alf Magnus Vahlquist (born 24 May 1938) is a Swedish diplomat. He joined the Ministry for Foreign Affairs in 1962, with early postings in Moscow and Beijing, and later served as first embassy secretary in Geneva. He held senior roles at the European Free Trade Association (EFTA) before leading Sweden's foreign trade unit and serving as deputy managing director of the Swedish Trade Council.

Vahlquist was ambassador to Japan (1992–1997) and Norway (1997–2002), later serving as Marshal of the Diplomatic Corps and Grand Master of Ceremonies at the Swedish Royal Court. He has also been active in cultural and foundation work, including establishing the Märta Christina and Magnus Vahlquist Foundation

== Early life ==
Vahlquist was born on 24 May 1938 in Motala, Sweden, the son of lector Alf C:son Vahlquist and Birgit (née Hæffner-Flodman). He had three younger siblings, the youngest of whom is Ambassador Fredrik Vahlquist.

His paternal grandfather was the physician and politician Conrad Vahlquist (1856–1929). His uncles were the pediatrician and academic Bo Vahlquist (1909–1978) and Sune Conradsson Vahlquist (1902–1988), who served as mayor of the town of Skänninge.

At the age of six, Vahlquist moved with his family to Vadstena, where he lived in the town center throughout his school years. During the summers, he worked as a guide at Övralid Manor. He completed his military service at the Swedish Army Interpreter School (Arméns tolkskkola), where he learned Russian. He studied languages and economics at Uppsala University, earning a Bachelor of Arts degree in 1960. After receiving a scholarship in French, he was expected to apply for a position at the Ministry for Foreign Affairs.

== Career ==
Vahlquist was appointed attaché at the Ministry for Foreign Affairs in 1962 and served in Moscow from 1963 to 1964 and in Beijing from 1965 to 1967. In 1972, then serving as a desk officer (departementssekreterare), he was appointed first embassy secretary at Sweden's delegation to the international organizations in Geneva. He went on to serve as chef de cabinet at the European Free Trade Association (EFTA) from 1976 to 1978 and as deputy secretary-general of EFTA from 1978 to 1982.

In 1982, he was appointed acting director-general (departementsråd) at the Ministry of Commerce and Industry, where he became head of the foreign trade unit responsible for Sweden's relations with the European Community (EC) and EFTA, bilateral relations with Western Europe, and matters concerning Nordic cooperation. From 1986 to 1992 as deputy managing director of the Swedish Trade Council. At the Trade Council, Vahlquist primarily promoted commercial relations with Eastern Europe, China, the Soviet Union, and developing countries.

He then served as ambassador to Tokyo from 1992 to 1997. From 1995, he was also held dual accreditations to the Marshall Islands and the Federated States of Micronesia. Between 1997 and 2002, he served as ambassador to Oslo. From 2003 to 2005, he was Marshal of the Diplomatic Corps (Introduktör av främmande sändebud), and from 2005 to 2011 he served as Grand Master of Ceremonies in the Royal Court of Sweden, where his responsibilities included overseeing the wedding of Crown Princess Victoria of Sweden and Daniel Westling.

In October 2003, Vahlquist was elected a member of the Idun Society. He has served as a board member of the Swedish-Japanese Foundation (Svensk-japanska stiftelsen) and was chairman of the Friends of the Vadstena Academy, a support association for the Vadstena Academy, for 16 years until September 2014. He is also honorary chairman of the Scandinavia-Japan Sasakawa Foundation and a member of the Friends of the Abbey Church (Klosterkyrkans Vänner), the Birgitta Foundation, and the Heidenstam Society (Heidenstamsällskapet).

In 2016, the Märta Christina and Magnus Vahlquist Foundation was established to support humanitarian work in Sweden and internationally, promote culture, the arts, education, and research (particularly in medicine), safeguard cultural and natural heritage—especially in Vadstena—and provide support to Swedish museums (notably Prince Eugen's Waldemarsudde and the Nationalmuseum), as well as contribute to the education and development of young people.

== Personal life ==
In 1963, Vahlquist married court secretary Märta Christina Trana (born 1938), the daughter of the civil engineer Einar Trana och Märta-Lisa (née Björkman).

After retiring from the Ministry for Foreign Affairs, Vahlquist and his wife bought Örgården, once Prince Eugen, Duke of Närke's summer residence outside Vadstena.

== Awards and decorations ==
- (Sweden) H. M. The King's Medal, 12th size, for meritorious services as Grand Master of Ceremonies (8 June 2010)
- (Norway) Grand Cross of the Royal Norwegian Order of Merit (2002)
- (Estonia) 2nd Class of the Order of the Cross of Terra Mariana (12 January 2011)

Diplomatic posts
Preceded by Ove Heyman	Ambassador of Sweden to Japan; 1992–1997	Succeeded by Krister Kumlin
Preceded by None	Ambassador of Sweden to the Marshall Islands; 1995–1997	Succeeded by Krister Kumlin
Preceded by None	Ambassador of Sweden to the Federated States of Micronesia; 1995–1997	Succeeded by Krister Kumlin
Preceded by Kjell Anneling	Ambassador of Sweden to Norway; 1997–2002	Succeeded by Mats Ringborg
Court offices
Preceded by Christer Sylvén	Grand Master of Ceremonies; 2005–2011	Succeeded by Lars Grundberg
