= Krister Kumlin =

Swedish diplomat (born 1938)

- Born: Ralf Krister Sten Wilhelm Kumlin; 2 December 1938 (age 87); Stockholm, Sweden
- Education: Stockholm University College
- Occupation: Diplomat
- Years active: 1962–2012
- Spouse(s): Gunilla Molander (m. 1962) Ewa Axelson (m. 1981)
- Children: 5, including Mikaela
- Relatives: Sten Dehlgren (grandfather)

Ralf Krister Sten Wilhelm Kumlin (born 2 December 1938) is a Swedish diplomat who served in the Ministry for Foreign Affairs from 1962 until his retirement in 2012. Over the course of his career, he held postings in Washington, D.C., Guatemala City, Bangkok, and Paris, and served in senior positions at the ministry in Stockholm. In 1982, he was appointed minister at Sweden's Permanent Mission to the United Nations in New York City and later served as vice president of the United Nations Economic and Social Council. He was ambassador to Brasília (1986–1990), ambassador to Athens (from 1993), and ambassador to Tokyo (1997–2002), with concurrent accreditation to the Marshall Islands and the Federated States of Micronesia.

After returning to Stockholm, he served at the Prime Minister's Office, was appointed Marshal of the Diplomatic Corps in 2005, and acted as senior adviser to the Swedish Emergency Management Agency until 2012. He also chaired several cultural and international committees and contributed to the establishment of the Stockholm Prize in Criminology.

== Early life ==
Kumlin was born on 2 December 1938 in Oscar Parish in Stockholm, Sweden, the son of Ambassador Ragnar Kumlin (1897–1979) and his wife Hervor (née Dehlgren). His paternal grandfather was the agronomist and agricultural reformer Wilhelm Kumlin (1859–1940), and his maternal grandfather was Sten Dehlgren (1881–1947), editor-in-chief of Dagens Nyheter.

He received a Candidate of Law degree from Stockholm University College in 1962.

== Career ==
Kumlin was appointed attaché at the Ministry for Foreign Affairs in 1962 and was posted to Washington, D.C., in 1963. He became embassy secretary in Guatemala City in 1965 and administrative officer (kanslisekreterare) at the ministry in 1967. In 1971, he was appointed first embassy secretary in Bangkok, followed by a posting to Paris in 1974, where he became embassy counsellor in 1977. He returned to the ministry in 1978 as deputy director (kansliråd).

In 1982, he was appointed minister at Sweden's Permanent Mission to the United Nations in New York City, and in 1985 he served as vice president of the United Nations Economic and Social Council. He was ambassador to Brasília from 1986 to 1990, after which he returned to the Ministry for Foreign Affairs as press director in 1990. In 1993, he was appointed ambassador to Athens, and from 1997 to 2002 he served as ambassador to Tokyo, with dual accreditation to the Marshall Islands and the Federated States of Micronesia.

After returning to Stockholm, Kumlin worked at the Prime Minister's Office, where he served as secretary-general of the Stockholm International Forum. He was executive secretary of the Euro-Atlantic Partnership Council Security Forum in Åre on 24–25 May 2005. In September 2005, he was appointed Marshal of the Diplomatic Corps (Introduktör av främmande sändebud) and later served as chargé d'affaires ad interim in Paris in 2007. Between 2005 and his retirement in 2012, he was senior adviser to the Swedish Emergency Management Agency (Krisberedskapsmyndigheten).

Kumlin chaired the Swedish Parthenon Committee, the Swedish Committee for the Return of the Parthenon Marbles (part of the International Association for the Reunification of the Parthenon Sculptures), the Friends' Association of the Swedish Institute at Athens (Föreningen Svenska Atheninstitutets Vänner), and ISO/TC 223 (Societal Security) from 2006 to 2012.

He also played a key facilitating role in the early stages of the process that led to the establishment of the Stockholm Prize in Criminology, first awarded in 2006, helping to open the door for discussions that would eventually result in the creation of the prize.

== Personal life ==
In 1962, Kumlin married Gunilla Molander (later Bristedt). Kumlin has three children with his first wife: Ambassador Mikaela Kumlin Granit (born 1967), Alexandra Kumlin (born 1969), and the fashion model Kristina Kumlin (born 1973).

In 1981, he married cultural counsellor Ewa Axelson (born 1955), daughter of the forest ranger Swen Axelson and the home economics teacher Märta (née Johansson). They had two sons: Fredrik (born 1984) and Philip (born 1986).

== Bibliography ==
- Kumlin, Krister; Kjellström, Björn; Bergström, Niklas, eds. (1991). Sverige och den västeuropeiska integrationen: vem informerar om vad? (in Swedish) (New updated ed.). Stockholm: Utrikesdep. ISBN 9138107384. SELIBR 7263776.

Diplomatic posts
Preceded by Lennart Rydfors	Ambassador of Sweden to Brazil; 1986–1990	Succeeded by Gunnar Hultner
Preceded by Anders Thunborg	Ambassador of Sweden to Greece; 1993–1997	Succeeded by Björn Elmér
Preceded by Magnus Vahlquist	Ambassador of Sweden to Japan; 1997–2002	Succeeded by Mikael Lindström
Preceded by Magnus Vahlquist	Ambassador of Sweden to the Marshall Islands; 1997–2002	Succeeded by Mikael Lindström
Preceded by Magnus Vahlquist	Ambassador of Sweden to the Federated States of Micronesia; 1997–2002	Succeeded by Mikael Lindström
