= Embassy of Sweden, Oslo =

- Location: Oslo
- Address: Inkognitogata 27; 0256 Oslo
- Coordinates: 59.91724°N 10.72102°E
- Opening: 1905
- Ambassador: Mikael Eriksson
- Jurisdiction: Norway
- Website: Official website

The Embassy of Sweden in Oslo is Sweden's diplomatic mission in Norway. It's located on Inkognitogata 27, close to The Queen Sonja Art Stable and the Royal Palace. The embassy was opened in 1905 and is tasked with representing Sweden and the Swedish government in Norway and promoting Sweden's interests.

== History ==
Diplomatic relations between Norway and Sweden were established after the dissolution of the union between Norway and Sweden in November 1905. The Swedish state then bought a property on Inkognitogata, intended as a residence for the Swedish envoy to Norway. Until the end of World War II, this property was both the residence of the ambassador and the chancery. In 1947, the Swedish legation in Norway received embassy status. After World War II, the operations required other premises that the embassy had to rent a property until the new chancery building on Nobels gate was completed in 1957. Since May 2019, the embassy has been back in the building on Inkognitogata.

== Staff and tasks ==
=== Staff ===
A total of 14 people work at the Swedish embassy, including one defence attaché and three sent from the Ministry for Foreign Affairs.

=== Tasks ===
The embassy's task is to represent Sweden and the Swedish government in Norway and to promote Sweden's interests. This is done through a close dialogue with Norwegian representatives and through information and cooperation with the cultural sector, companies and other authorities and organisations. The embassy also works closely with other Swedish organizations present in Norway, including Business Sweden, Voksenåsen and the Church of Sweden. In addition, Sweden has eight consulates in various locations in Norway.

== Buildings ==
=== Inkognitogata 27 (1906–present) ===
The chancery and residence is located at Inkognitogata 27 in the Uranienborg neighborhood in the borough of Frogner. The house was designed by the Norwegian architect Ove Ekman and was built in classicist style in 1872–1873. The house dates back to the 18th century when it was part of a country estate just outside the city limits. Today, the property's surroundings are made up of the Royal Palace and the Palace Park. From the beginning, the house had a rectangular building, two floors and a plastered facade. The owner of the house, wholesaler Adolph Holter and his family, lived here until the end of the 19th century when Holter had such great financial problems that he had to sell. The house was purchased by the Swedish state in 1906 for SEK 100,000 and is the third oldest state-owned Swedish property of the Swedish foreign service after the one in Istanbul (1757) and the one in Madrid (1904). In connection with the purchase, the house was rebuilt to partly create a building with a more Swedish character, partly to adapt the house for its new purpose as a chancery and residence. Another floor, to accommodate the chancery and guest rooms, was added as well as extensions for the kitchen, serving room, entrance hall and veranda. The facades were also replastered. The rebuilding in 1906–1907 was led by the Swedish architect Fredrik Lilljekvist. Until the end of World War II, the house functioned as both a chancery and residence for the Swedish envoy and his family. From 1945, temporary premises were rented in the area until the chancery moved into newly built premises at Nobels gate 16 in 1957. Areas that were vacated with the move in the house on Inkognitogatan were converted, among other things, into guest rooms and a chef's residence. Somewhat later, a gatekeeper's house was also built in the style of the main building.

As both houses on Inkognitogata and Nobels gate were too large and had empty areas, the solution was to combine all functions at one address. In February 2017, the National Property Board of Sweden petitioned the Swedish government to carry out the reconstruction of the residence for an estimated SEK 30 million, and in August of the same year the project was given the greenlight. In 2018–2019, a reconstruction by architect Bo Hofsten took place. Renovation and adaptation was done to re-house the chancery in the same building as the residence. When the National Property Board of Sweden began the renovation in 2018, the residence consisted of a basement, two floors and an attic alongside a couple of smaller houses such as a garage and a gate house. Interior-wise, the renovation has mainly concerned the attic, which was converted to function as a chancery. When the house was empty, all surface layers, where there was a need, were also refreshed. Externally, the garage was demolished and replaced with a new building of the same size, in the same location. The building's new entrance and the consular office were moved here. The front door was artistically designed by Göran Strååt in the 1950s and has been moved from the former chancery. Accessibility was also significantly improved during the renovation by adding a new accessible lift, an accessible toilet and a lifting table in the consular office. In terms of energy, the biggest improvement was the old electric boiler which was removed and that the house has been connected to district heating instead. The project in Oslo was in line with the National Property Board of Sweden's work to contribute to the global goals in Agenda 2030 and the goal of social sustainability. In 2019, the residence and the chancery were inaugurated by Foreign Minister Margot Wallström in the presence of the National Property Board of Sweden's Director General Ingrid Eiken Holmgren.

=== Meltzers gate 4 (1949–1957) ===
Between 1949 and 1957, the chancery was located at Meltzers gate 4 in the Uranienborg neighborhood in the borough of Frogner.

=== Nobels gate 16 (1957–2019) ===
Between 1957 and 2019, the chancery was located at Nobels gate 16 in the district of Frogner.

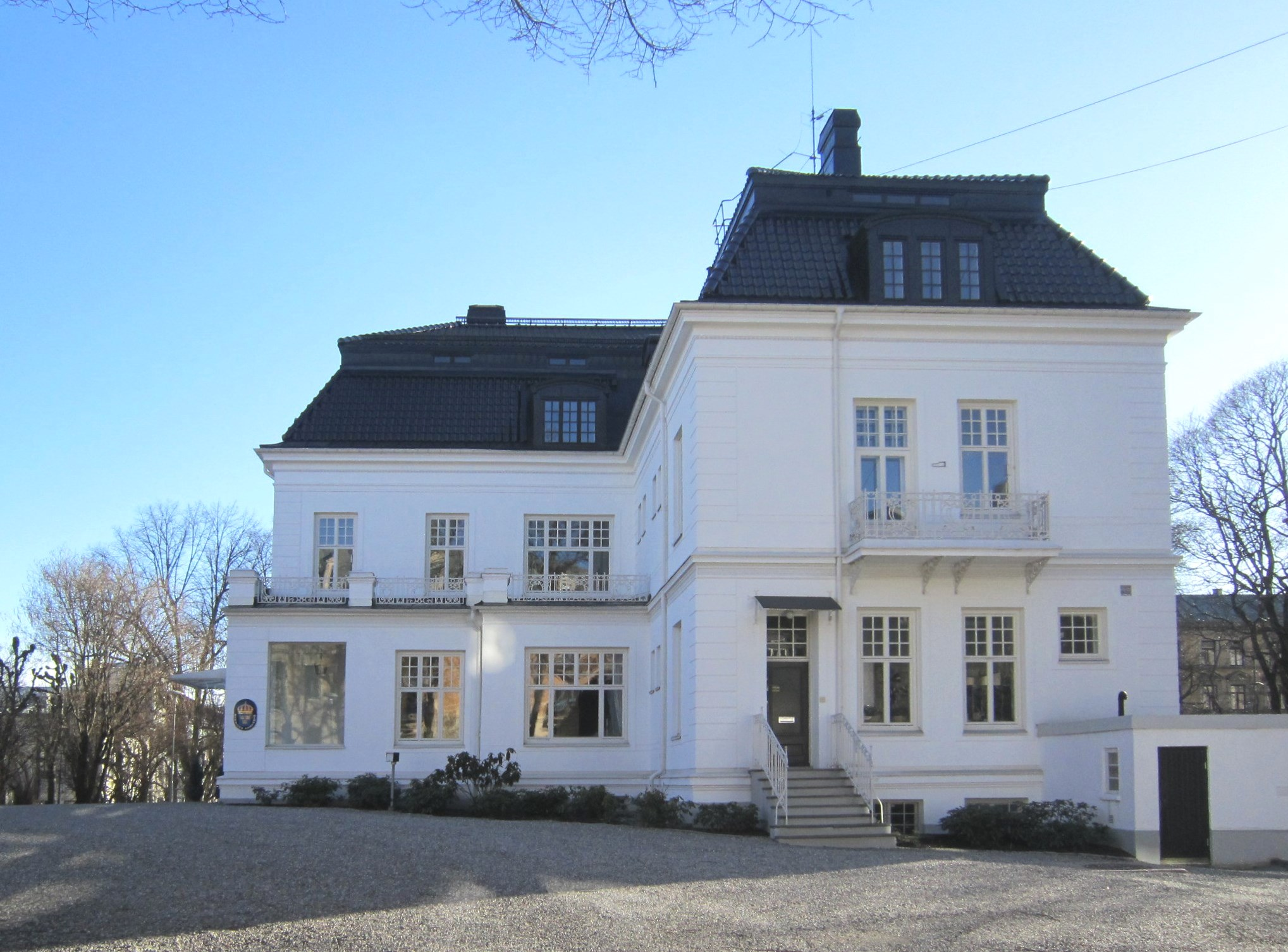
Inkognitogata 27
Chancery (1906–1949, 2019–present) and residence (1906–present)

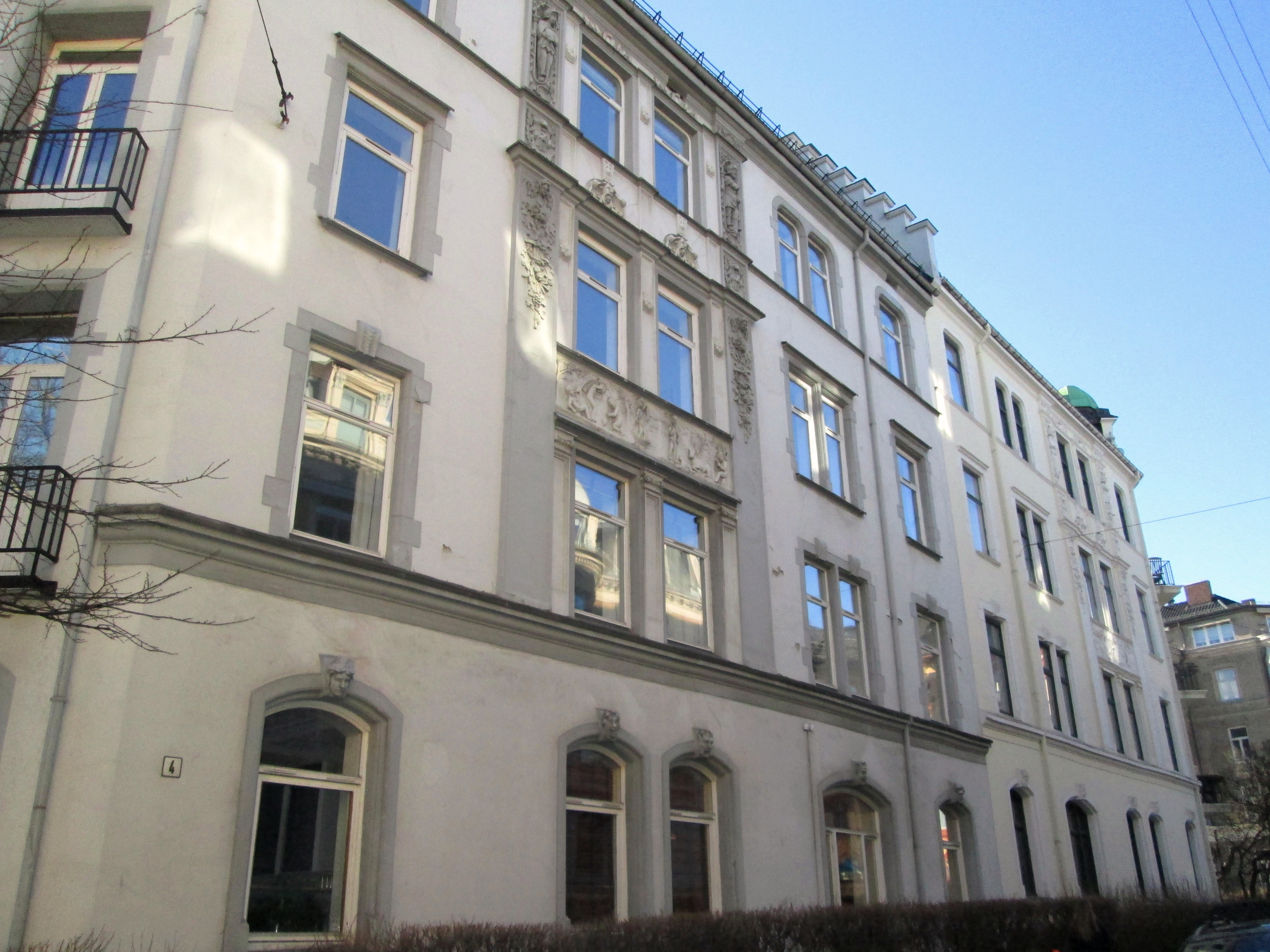
Meltzers gate 4
Chancery (1949–1957)

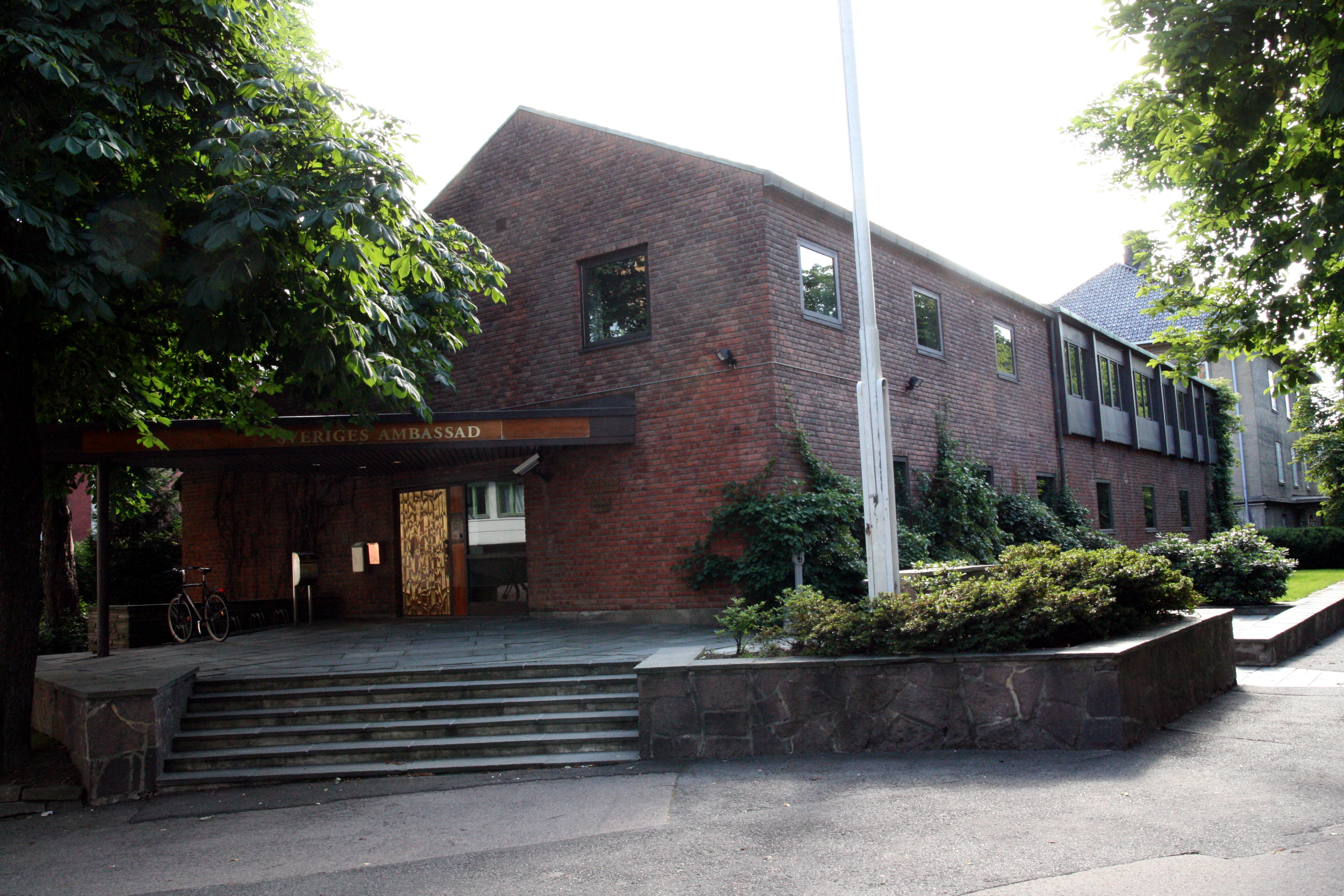
Nobels gate 16
Chancery (1957–2019)

== See also ==
- Norway–Sweden relations
