= Giovanni Cavalli =

Italian inventor and politician (1808–1879)

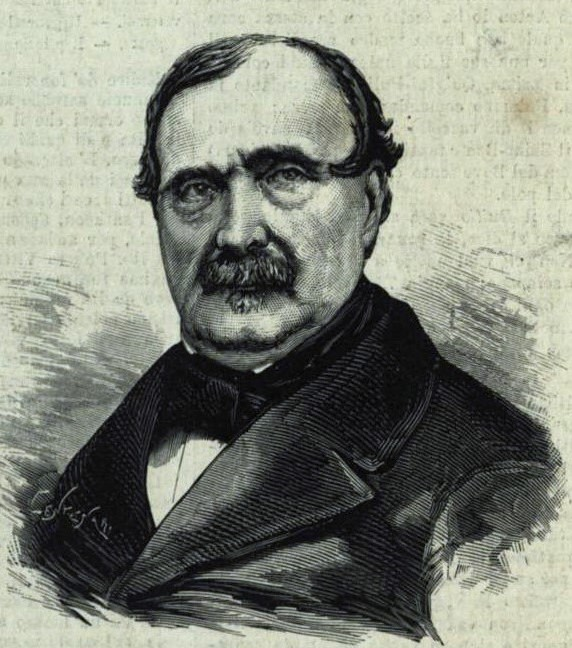
Giovanni Cavalli

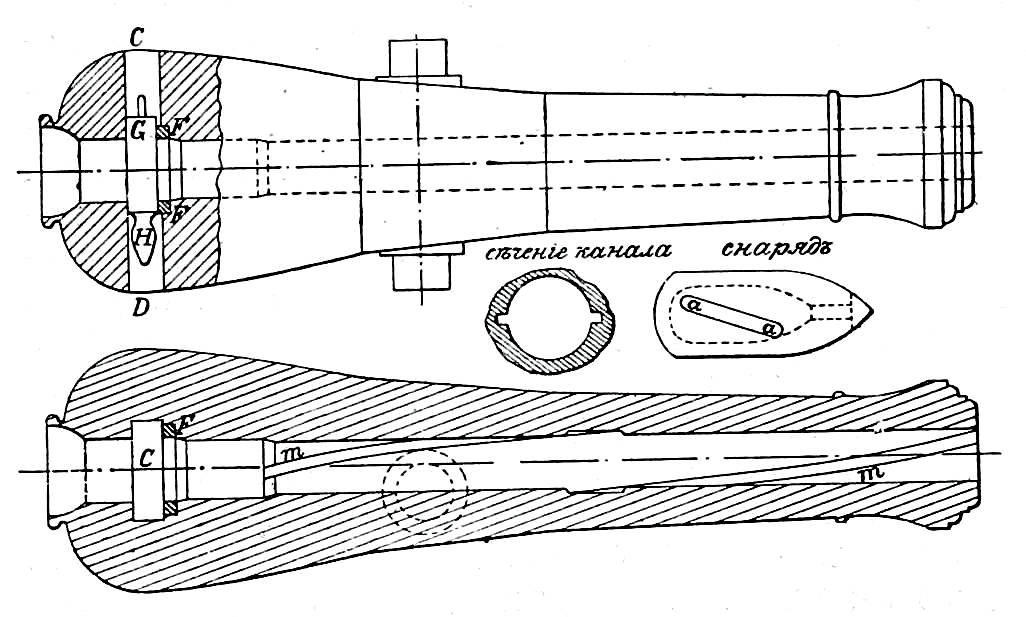

Giovanni Cavalli (Novara, 23 July 1808 – Turin, 23 December 1879) was an Italian lieutenant general, artillerist and inventor. He is credited with the creation of the first successful rifled breech loader gun.

== Biography ==
He entered the Royal Academy of Turin in 1818, and graduated from it in 1828 as first of his class, with the rank of lieutenant. He worked on ways to reform and improve the work of artillerist and pontoneers, detailing proposals to change size and duties of gun crews, the procedures to drill them, among others.

Then-captain Cavalli's first design for a breech-loading gun dated from 1832, but initially it was met with indifference; only in 1843 his proposal sparked some interest, and he was sent to Sweden to oversee the construction of an experimental rifled gun to his specifications. He met there and collaborated with Baron Martin von Wahrendorff, and in 1846 the first trials with the gun met with resounding success.

He fought in the First War of Italian Independence with the rank of major, participating in the siege of Peschiera del Garda; he also served in a similar capacity in the Second Italian War of Independence, as a colonel. Afterwards, he became director of the foundry of the Turin arsenal.

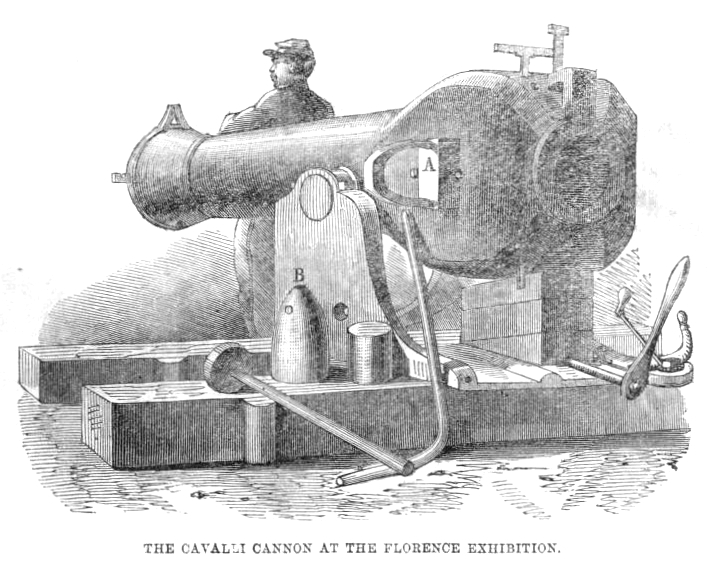
The Cavalli cannon at the Florence Exhibition of 1861, Illustrated London News

Promoted to major general in 1860 and to lieutenant general in 1862, he served on the Comitato d'Artiglieria (Artillery Committee), and from April 1865 as commander of the Royal Academy of Turin. He retired in July 1879, dying in Turin shortly after.
