= Telub affair =

The Telub affair (Swedish: Telubaffären) was a political scandal in Sweden in the early 1980s.

In 1977 the Swedish government-owned company Telub was contacted by a representative of the Libyan military who wanted to explore the possibilities to buy education for a group of Libyan military students. The education was in the field of telecommunication techniques and engineering. Telub won the contract in fierce competition with other European companies, and in March 1979 the contract between Telub and the Libyan military was signed. The 96 Libyan students arrived in Sweden in March 1980.

The case became heated when the newspaper Expressen in an article described the group of Libyan students as future terrorists. One of the strongest critics was Olle Wästberg, an MP for the People's Party, who described them as agents of the Palestine Liberation Organization (PLO). In January 1981 it was revealed that the technical education also had some military fields of use. While there was no legal ground to force Telub to cancel its education, the pressure on the company eventually became so hard that the Libyan students had to leave Sweden. A German company then overtook the contract.

The case was reviewed by the parliamentary Committee on the Constitution. The committee criticised Minister of Commerce and Industry Staffan Burenstam Linder for his handling of the case. However, Minister for Foreign Affairs Karin Söder and Minister for Defence Eric Krönmark were not criticised since the Communist Party laid down their votes in those cases.

The Swedish government also started an official investigation, which published its report in 1981.

== Bibliography ==
- Hedlund, Ingvar (1980). Ska Sverige utbilda terrorister?: en rapport om Telubaffären (in Swedish). Stockholm: Marieberg. ISBN 9175880423. SELIBR 7650061.
- Telubutredningen (1981). Telubaffären: granskning verkställd av Telubutredningen : betänkande (in Swedish). Stockholm: LiberFörlag/Allmänna förl. ISBN 9138063522. SELIBR 7260699.
