= Olle Wästberg =

Swedish politician (1945–2023)

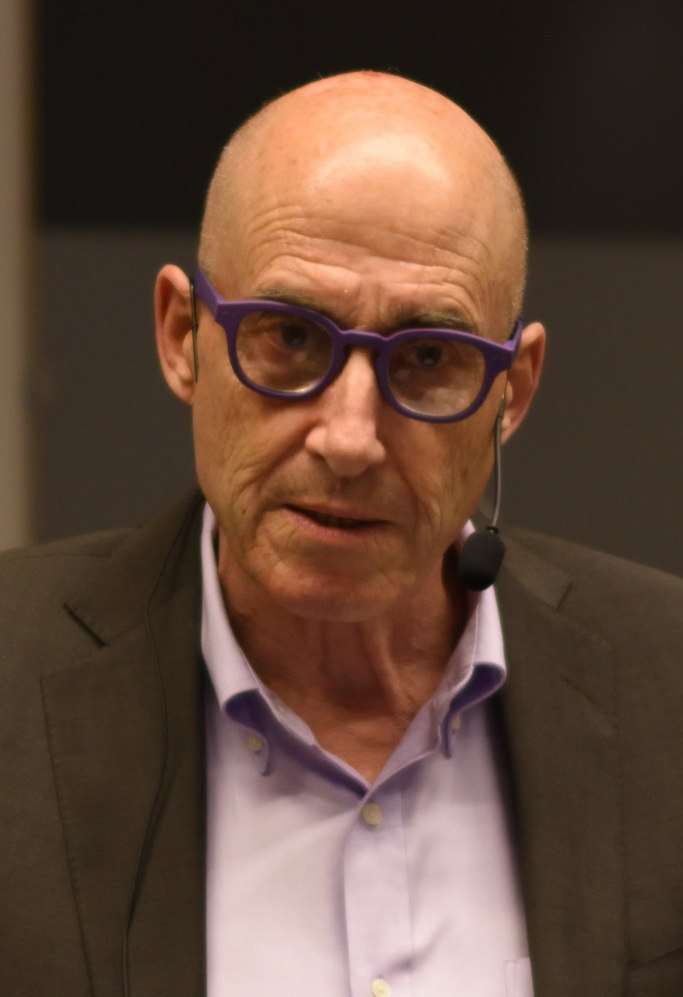
- Wästberg in 2016

Consul General of Sweden to New York City
- In office 1999–2004
- Preceded by: Dag Sebastian Ahlander
- Succeeded by: Kjell Anneling

Personal details
- Born: Olof Mattias Wästberg; 6 May 1945 Stockholm, Sweden
- Died: 10 October 2023 (aged 78)
- Party: Liberal People's Party
- Spouse: Inger Claesson-Wästberg
- Children: 2
- Relatives: Per Wästberg (brother)
- Education: Stockholm University
- Website: wastberg.se

Olof "Olle" Mattias Wästberg (6 May 1945 – 10 October 2023) was a Swedish journalist, politician and diplomat, who served as Director-General of the Swedish Institute from 2005 to 2010.

== Biography ==
Olle Wästberg was born in Stockholm, the son of Erik Wästberg and his wife Greta née Hirsch, and is the younger brother of Per Wästberg. He received a Candidate of Philosophy in political science and economic history from Stockholm University in 1972. He was married to Inger Claesson-Wästberg with whom he had two children.

Wästberg started his political career in the Liberal Youth of Sweden, where he served as Secretary-General from 1966 to 1969. He worked as an editorial writer in Expressen from 1969 to 1971. He was elected Member of Parliament for the Liberal People's Party from 1976 to 1982. During his time as an MP, he was noted for his criticism towards the Fälldin government during the Telub affair in 1981. From 1983 to 1991 Wästberg was CEO of the company Dagspressens marknadsinformation AB. From 1991 to 1993 he served as State Secretary at the Swedish Ministry of Finance under Minister for Finance Anne Wibble. In 1993 Wästberg became editor-in-chief of Expressen, but was fired in 1995 after a conflict with the Bonnier family owners.

From 1999 to 2004 Wästberg served as Consul-General of Sweden in New York City. He was appointed Director-General of the Swedish Institute on 1 March 2005. He has written many articles and books on New York and in 2005 he nominated its former mayor Rudy Giuliani for the Nobel Peace Prize for his efforts to severely reduce crime rates in the city.

Wästberg died on 10 October 2023, at the age of 78.

== Sources ==
- Judisk Krönika, 1–1999

Diplomatic posts
Preceded by Dag Sebastian Ahlander	Consul General of Sweden to New York City; 1999–2004	Succeeded by Kjell Anneling
