= Master of Ceremonies (Sweden) =

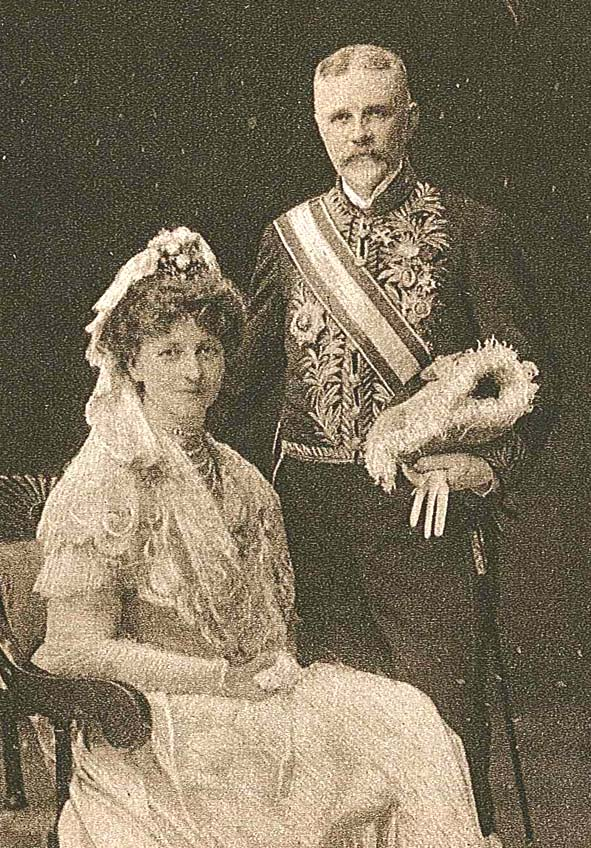
Robert Sager (1850–1919) was Grand Master of the Ceremonies from 1907 to 1918.

Master of Ceremonies (Swedish: Ceremonimästare) or more properly Grand Master of the Ceremonies (Swedish: Överceremonimästare), in Sweden are three chief administrators charged with ceremonial matters relating to the Royal Court of Sweden.

== History ==
Sweden has since 1802 a Grand Master of Ceremonies, a Master of Ceremonies and a Vice Master of Ceremonies within the Royal Court of Sweden. They are part of the Ceremonial Household (Ceremonielet), also called the Office of Ceremonies which in turn is a part of the Office of the Marshal of the Court (Hovmarskalksämbetet). They are responsible for ceremonial state visits, formal audiences, medal awards, official meals and receptions, as well as during royal christenings, birthdays, marriages, and burials. The Grand Master of Ceremonies is usually a former ambassador and has a special responsibility for contacts with the diplomatic corps in Stockholm.

The professional backgrounds of the Master of Ceremonies, Vice Master of Ceremonies, Cabinet Chamberlain's and Chamberlain's varies from culture, science, business and defense and other government service. Together they must have a significant personal attention which comes in handy in the care of guests.

== Grand Master of Ceremonies ==
- ????–????: Johan Jacob Burensköld
- 1701–1712: Johan Gabriel Sparwenfeld
- ????–????: ?
- 1732–????: Gustaf Cronström
- ????–????: Jakob Silfverstedt
- 1748–????: Johan Bergenstierna
- 1748–????: Hakvin Stiernblad
- 1758–1767: Lennart Ribbing
- ????–????: ?
- 1778–1782: Carl Anders Plommenfelt
- ????–????: ?
- 1802–1826: Leonard von Hauswolff
- 1826–1828: Åke Gustaf Oxentierna (acting)
- 1828–1831: Martin von Wahrendorff
- 1831–1843: Carl Gustaf Eickstedt d'Albedyhll
- 1843–1854: Carl Jedvard Bonde
- ????–????: ?
- 1863–1883: Filip von Saltza
- 1883–1896: Carl Fredrik Palmstierna
- 1896–1900: Carl Carlson Bonde
- ????–????: ?
- 1902–1907: Fredrik von Rosen
- 1907–1918: Robert Sager
- 1919–1950: Eugène von Rosen
- 1951–1953: Louis Carl Gerard Etienne de Geer af Leufsta
- 1953–1970: Joen Lagerberg
- 1971–1977: Alexis Aminoff
- 1977–1983: Tore Tallroth
- 1983–1988: Axel Lewenhaupt
- 1988–1995: Carl Gustaf von Platen
- 1995–2000: Tom Tscherning
- 2000–2005: Christer Sylvén
- 2005–2011: Magnus Vahlquist
- 2011–2014: Lars Grundberg
- 2014–2023: Johan Molander
- 2023–present: Anders Ahnlid
