= Lennart Bodström =

Swedish politician (1928–2015)

Minister for Foreign Affairs
- In office 8 October 1982 – 17 October 1985
- Prime Minister: Olof Palme
- Preceded by: Ola Ullsten
- Succeeded by: Sten Andersson

Personal details
- Born: 20 April 1928 Gothenburg, Sweden
- Died: 30 April 2015 (aged 87)
- Party: Swedish Social Democratic Party
- Relatives: Thomas Bodström (son, politician)
- Occupation: politician

Ture Lennart Bodström (20 April 1928 – 30 April 2015) was a Swedish politician born in Gothenburg, who served as the Minister for Foreign Affairs in Olof Palme's Social Democratic cabinet from 1982 to 1985.

His refusal, without further evidence, to participate in the accusations against the Soviet Union regarding its possible submarine operations in Swedish waters led to a motion of confidence against him in the Riksdag, which failed. This is still as of 2008 the only time such a motion has been raised against a single member of a Swedish government (although some have resigned facing the threat of one).

Following the 1985 election, Bodström was reassigned to the post of Minister for Education. Bodström's son Thomas Bodström is also a Social Democratic politician.

He died one week and three days after his 87th birthday.

Government offices
Preceded by Björn Molin	Minister of Commerce and Industry; October 1982–December 1982	Succeeded by Mats Hellström
Preceded by Ola Ullsten	Minister for Foreign Affairs; 1982–1985	Succeeded by Sten Andersson
Preceded by Lena Hjelm-Wallén	Minister for Education; 1985–1989	Succeeded by Bengt Göransson
Diplomatic posts
Preceded by Axel Edelstam	Ambassador of Sweden to Norway; 1989–1993	Succeeded by Kjell Anneling
