= List of ambassadors of Sweden to Marshall Islands =

Ambassador of Sweden to the Marshall Islands
- Lesser coat of arms of the Kingdom of Sweden

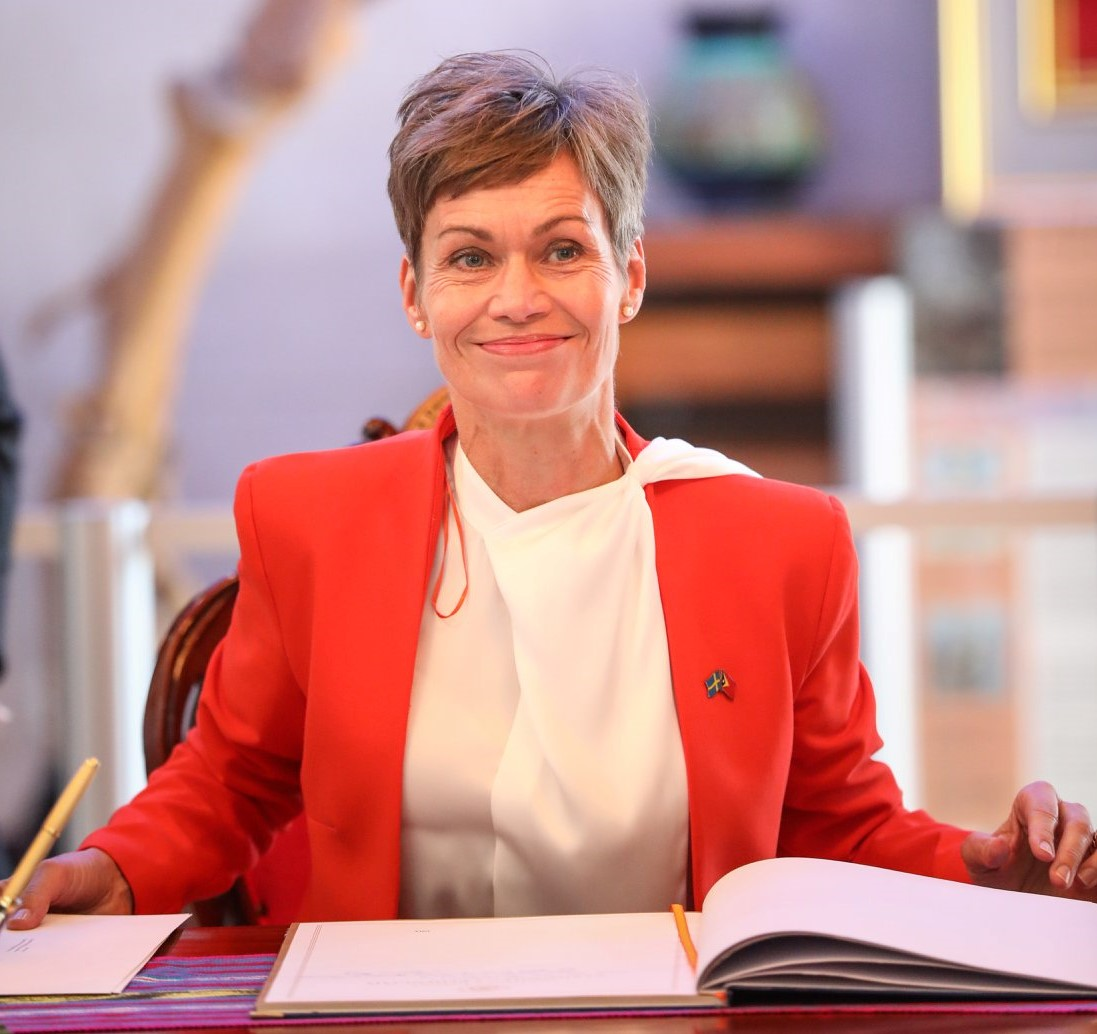
- Incumbent; Marina Berg since 2025
- Ministry for Foreign Affairs
- Style: His or Her Excellency (formal); Mr. or Madam Ambassador (informal)
- Reports to: Minister for Foreign Affairs
- Seat: Stockholm, Sweden (Note: Since 2025, the Swedish ambassador to the Marshall Islands is based in Stockholm, Sweden.)
- Appointer: Government of Sweden
- Term length: No fixed term
- Inaugural holder: Magnus Vahlquist
- Formation: 1995

The Ambassador of Sweden to the Marshall Islands (known formally as the Ambassador of the Kingdom of Sweden to the Republic of the Marshall Islands) is the official representative of the government of Sweden to the president of the Marshall Islands and government of the Marshall Islands. Since Sweden does not have an embassy in Majuro, Sweden's ambassador to the Marshall Islands is based in Stockholm, Sweden.

== History ==
On 5 September 1991, Sweden recognized the Marshall Islands as an independent state. The background was that the Marshall Islands sought admission as a member of the United Nations.

The Swedish government decided on 5 December 1991 to enter into an agreement on the establishment of diplomatic relations with the Marshall Islands through an exchange of notes. The agreement was signed in Washington, D.C. on 10 December 1991 by Ambassador Anders Thunborg on behalf of Sweden and Ambassador Wilfred I. Kendall on behalf of the Marshall Islands. The agreement entered into force on 14 February 1992.

In 1995, a Swedish ambassador was accredited for the first time in the capital of the Marshall Islands, Majuro. Between 1995 and 2024, Sweden's ambassador in Tokyo was concurrently accredited to Majuro.

As of 2025, the post of Swedish ambassador to the Marshall Islands is held by a Stockholm-based ambassador-at-large, who is also ambassador to 10 other countries in Oceania.

== List of representatives ==
Name	Period	Title	Notes	Presented credentials	Ref
Magnus Vahlquist	1995–1997	Ambassador	Resident in Tokyo		
Krister Kumlin	1997–2002	Ambassador	Resident in Tokyo		
Mikael Lindström	2002–2006	Ambassador	Resident in Tokyo		
Stefan Noreén	2006–2011	Ambassador	Resident in Tokyo		
Lars Vargö	2011–2014	Ambassador	Resident in Tokyo		
?	2014–2024	Ambassador			
Marina Berg	2025–present	Ambassador	Resident in Stockholm		
