= Voksenåsen =

Hill in Oslo, Norway

Coordinates: 59°58′25″N 10°39′37″E

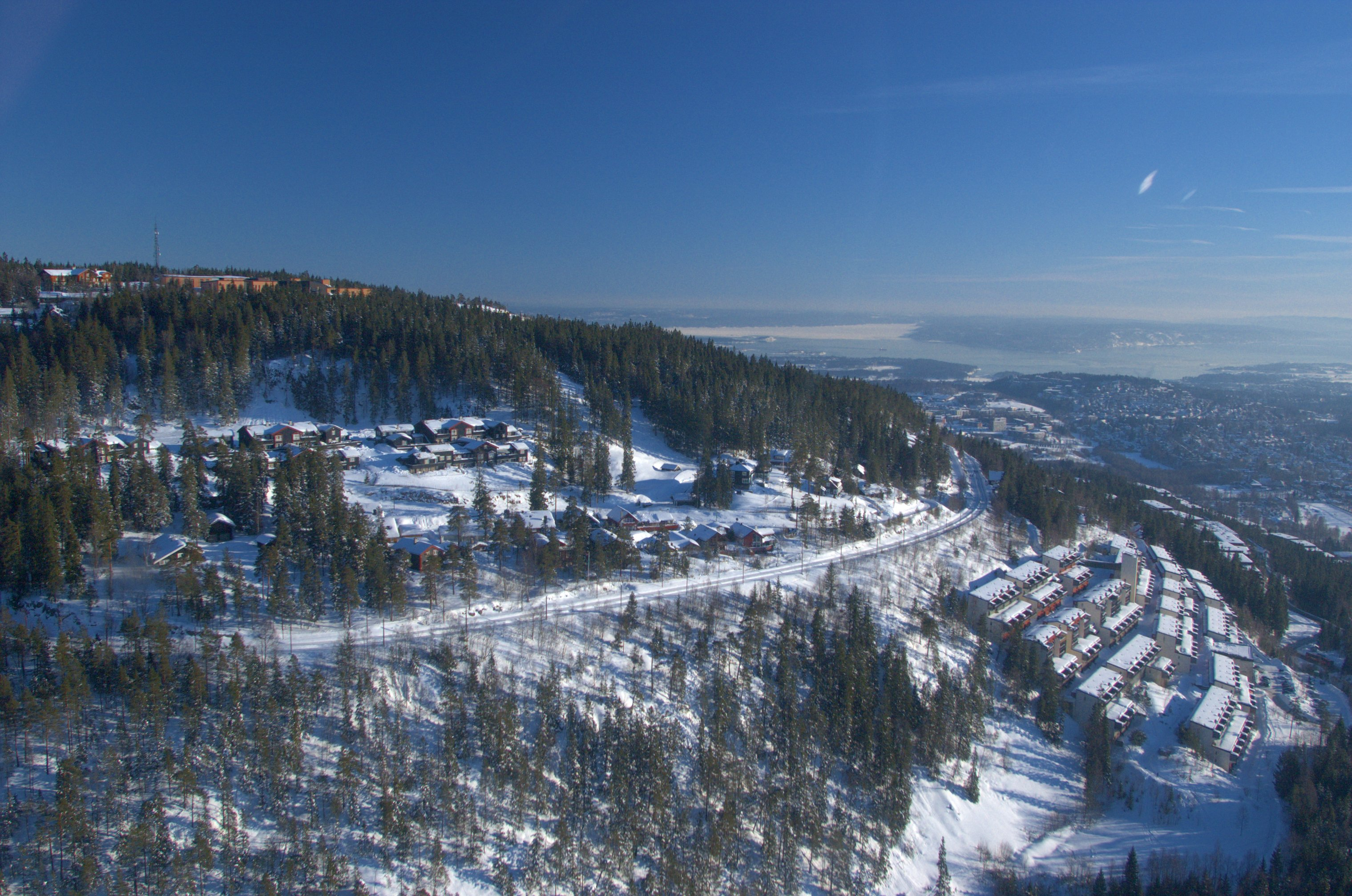
Voksenåsen's west side, with Skogen station and the neighborhood to the right. .

Voksenåsen is a hill and neighborhood in Vestre Aker borough in Oslo, Norway.

== Vokenåsen Hotel ==
Vokenåsen Hotel is a hotel and conference facility at the summit of the hill. It was given by Norway to Sweden as thanks for the help provided to Norway in the Second World War. Today the hotel is operated as both a hotel and conference venue and a centre for Norwegian-Swedish cooperation.

== Education ==
Down towards Bogstad is the Grindbakken primary school. With the exception of Voksentoppen Skole, a special school for children with disabilities, no other schools are located in the area. Middle-School students from the area walk, bike, drive or take the train down to Midtstuen School, while one has to go closer to the center of Oslo to find the nearest high school.
