= Sten Dehlgren =

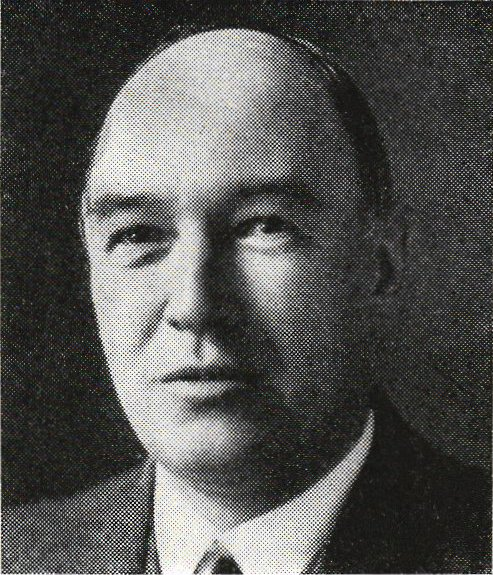
- Born: Sten Fredrik Dehlgren; 26 May 1881; Stockholm, Sweden
- Died: 21 November 1947 (aged 66); Stockholm, Sweden
- Occupations: Navy officer; newspaper editor
- Employer: Dagens Nyheter
- Relatives: Krister Kumlin (grandson)

Sten Fredrik Dehlgren (26 May 1881 – 21 November 1947) was a Swedish Navy officer and newspaper editor.

== Early life ==
Dehlgren was born on 26 May 1881 in the City of Stockholm, Stockholm County, Sweden, the son of the regimental chaplain Alfred Teodor Dehlgren, and Henrietta (Jetta) Sofia Malmgren. He attended Beskowska skolan from 1887 to 1893 before joining the navy in 1894.

== Career ==
In 1922, Dehlgren was appointed editor-in-chief of the newspaper Dagens Nyheter. He also served as chairman of the board of the news agency Tidningarnas Telegrambyrå for several years.

During the Second World War, he chaired the disciplinary and censorship committees Pressrådet (1939–1941) and Council of the Press (from 1941).

== Personal life ==
On 29 December 1906, Dehlgren married Rut Amelie Swanlund (born 22 September 1886 in Karlskrona), the daughter of the pharmacist Per Ernst Rikard Swanlund and Amelie Hildegard Haggren.

== Death ==
Dehlgren died in 1947 in Skeppsholm Parish, Stockholm County, Sweden.
