= Martin von Wahrendorff =

Swedish diplomat and inventor (1789–1861)

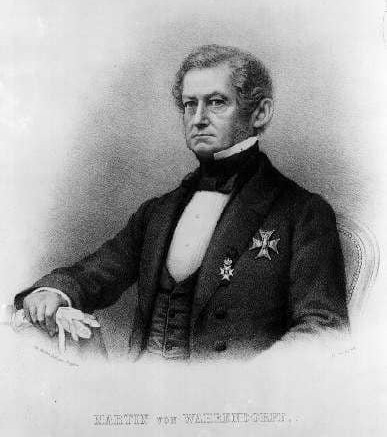
- Born: 1789
- Died: 1861 (aged 71–72)
- Occupations: Diplomat, inventor

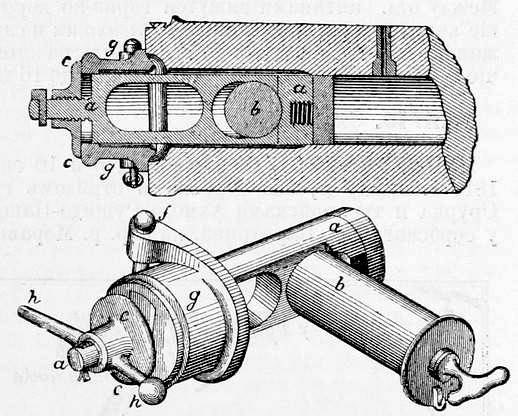
Wahrendorff breech

Martin von Wahrendorff (1789 – 1861) was a Swedish diplomat and inventor.

His father Anders von Wahrendorff was the owner of the gun foundry at Åker. Wahrendorff was Grand Master of Ceremonies at the Royal Court of Sweden from 1828 to 1831

In 1837 Wahrendorff applied for patent on a new breech mechanism, later known as the Wahrendorff breech. The first breech loaded Wahrendorff gun was manufactured at Åker in 1840. In the 1840s the Sardinian major Giovanni Cavalli was sent to the Åker foundry to inspect guns that the Sardinian government had ordered. The two then started experimenting with pointed elongated lead-coated projectiles fired from rifled, breech loading, guns of Wahrendorff's design. In 1854 the Swedish Army adopted three different types of smooth bored breech loaded Wahrendorff guns, in calibers from 155 to 226 mm.

Wahrendorff died in 1861.
