= Mikael Lindström =

Swedish diplomat

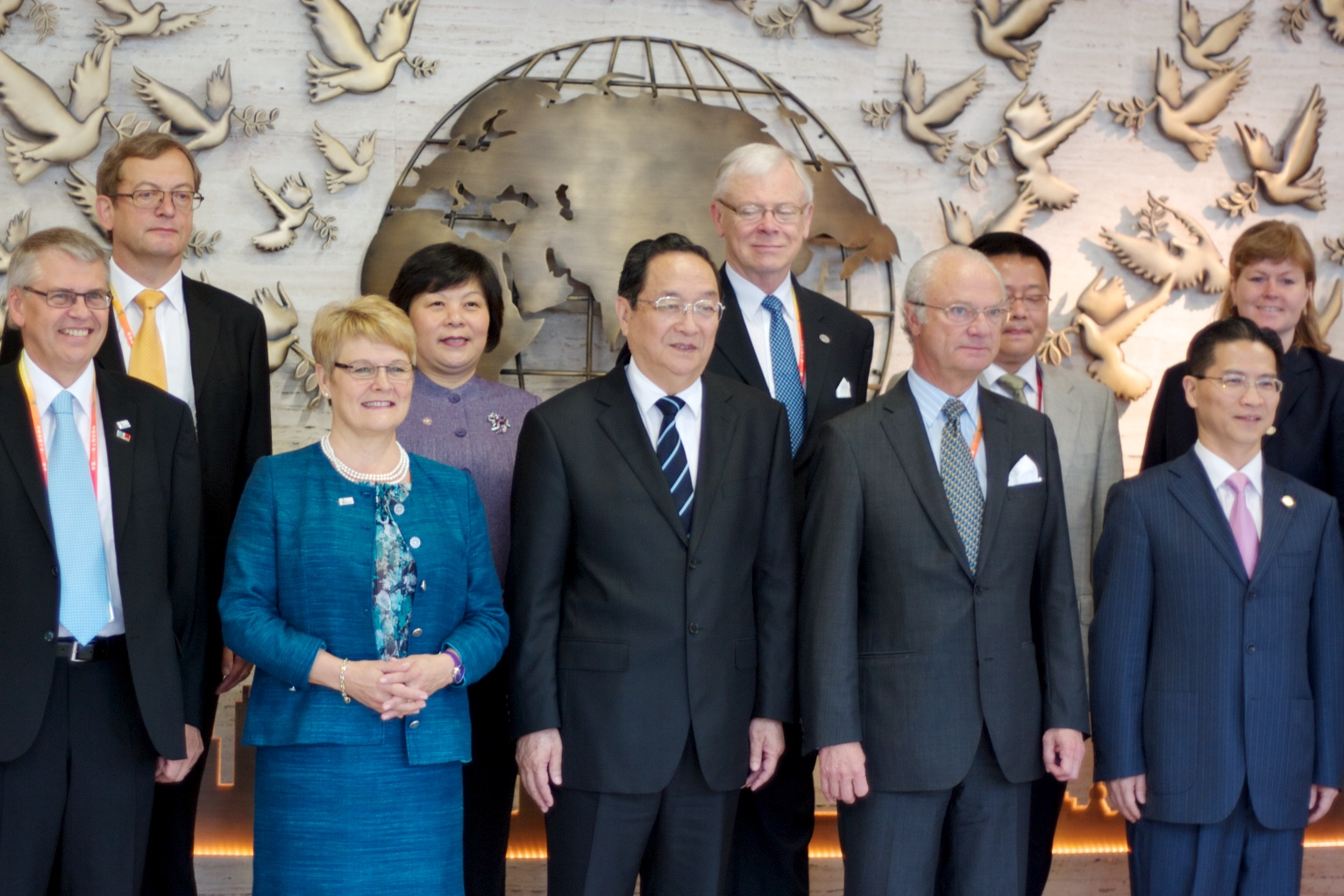
- Lindström (in the middle of the back row) as ambassador to China.
- Born: Jan-Mikael Lindström; 20 August 1944 (age 81); Solna, Sweden
- Education: Sigtunaskolan Humanistiska Läroverket
- Alma mater: Uppsala University; Northwestern University Pritzker School of Law
- Occupation: Diplomat
- Years active: 1970–2020
- Spouse: Kerstin Davidson (m. 1971)
- Children: 3

Jan-Mikael Lindström (born 20 August 1944) is a retired Swedish diplomat. Lindström's career in international diplomacy spans several decades, beginning with his role as a foreign service officer in Sweden's Ministry for Foreign Affairs in 1970. He gained early experience at embassies in Rabat and Paris, before specializing in European trade and nuclear non-proliferation issues at the Ministry. From 1983 to 1987, he was stationed at the Swedish Embassy in Washington, D.C., and later became deeply involved in international trade negotiations, including the Uruguay Round and China's accession to GATT, working in Geneva from 1990 to 1994. Lindström then served as Sweden's ambassador to Jakarta, Tokyo, and Beijing, where he furthered Sweden's diplomatic relationships in Asia and addressed complex trade and investment issues. His diplomatic work included membership in the WTO Dispute Settlement Panel and culminated with a key role as Chief Co-ordinator for Trade and Investment Promotion.

== Early life ==
Lindström was born on 20 August 1944 in Solna, Sweden, the son of Jan-Gunnar Lindström and his wife Monica (née Söderberg). Lindström's father worked as a manager at a government agency in Sweden, but in early 1949, he was offered a position with the United Nations, which was still relatively new. In February of that year, the family traveled to New York City on the Swedish American Line, where Lindström's father began his role as a director in the UN Secretariat. Lindström, who was then four and a half, lived in New York City until the age of twelve. He then Sigtunaskolan Humanistiska Läroverket (SSHL) for six years. He graduated from SSHL in 1963. Lindström received a Candidate of Law degree from Uppsala University in 1967.

Between 1968 and 1969, Lindström was a Ford Foundation fellow in international law and a Fulbright scholar. In 1969, he graduated with a Master of Laws degree from Northwestern University Pritzker School of Law. He received a Bachelor of Arts in economics from Uppsala University in 1970 and etween 1968 and 1970 he was teaching assistant in international law at the same university.

== Career ==
Lindström joined the Ministry for Foreign Affairs as a foreign service officer in 1970. He was posted to the Swedish Embassy in Rabat as a second embassy secretary from 1973 to 1976 and as first embassy secretary in Paris from 1976 to 1979. He then served as Head of Section for European Coal and Steel Community, Trade Department, Ministry for Foreign Affairs from 1979 and 1981 and Head of Section for Nuclear and Non-proliferation Affairs, Political Department from 1981 to 1983. Lindström was also an expert on the Atomic Legislation Committee (atomlagstiftningskommittéen) from 1981 to 1983.

From 1983 to 1987, he served as first secretary at the Swedish Embassy in Washington, D.C. and as a representative to the International Cotton Council. Lindström then served as deputy director (kansliråd) and of the Department for Trade with Africa, Asia, and Latin America at the Foreign Ministry in Stockholm from 1987 to 1989, and of the Department for Multilateral Trade Affairs from 1989 to 1990. From 1990 to 1994, Lindström was Minister Plenipotentiary and Uruguay Round negotiator, Swedish Delegation to the International Organisations in Geneva. During this time he was also member of the Working Group on China's Accession to GATT (WTO). Lindström was also a Nordic countries representative in negotiations for establishing the World Trade Organization (WTO) from 1990 to 1994. He chaired negotiations on an international aviation industry agreement from 1991 to 1993.

Lindström then served as ambassador in Jakarta from 1994 to 1998, and as director (departementsråd) and head of the ministers of commerce's office from 1998 to 2000. He has also served as a member of the World Trade Organization's Dispute Settlement Panel. From 2000 to 2002, he was Chief Co-ordinator for Trade and Investment Promotion at the Foreign Ministry and from October 2002 to 2006 he served as ambassador to Tokyo, with a dual accreditation to the Marshall Islands and the Federated States of Micronesia. From 2006 to 2010, Lindström served as ambassador to Beijing with a dual accreditation to Ulaanbaatar.

From 2011 to 2020, Lindström was a senior advisor to Huawei Sweden. He is currently a senior advisor with the business consultancy Six Year Plan AB. He is also chairman of Sweden Asia Consulting AB.

== Personal life ==
In 1971, Lindström married Kerstin Davidson (born 1949), the daughter of mining engineer Per Davidson and Ulla (née Jansson). They have three children.

Diplomatic posts
Preceded by Lars-Erik Wingren	Ambassador of Sweden to Indonesia; 1994–1998	Succeeded by Harald Sandberg
Preceded by Krister Kumlin	Ambassador of Sweden to Japan; 2002–2006	Succeeded by Stefan Noreén
Preceded by Krister Kumlin	Ambassador of Sweden to the Marshall Islands; 2002–2006	Succeeded by Stefan Noreén
Preceded by Krister Kumlin	Ambassador of Sweden to the Federated States of Micronesia; 2002–2006	Succeeded by Stefan Noreén
Preceded by Börje Ljunggren	Ambassador of Sweden to China; 2006–2010	Succeeded by Lars Fredén
Preceded by Börje Ljunggren	Ambassador of Sweden to Mongolia; 2006–2010	Succeeded by Lars Fredén
