= Norway–Sweden relations =

- Norway: Sweden

Diplomatic mission
- Embassy of Norway in Stockholm: Embassy of Sweden in Oslo

Envoy
- Ambassador Anne K. Lund: Ambassador Axel Wernhof

Norway and Sweden have a very long history together. They were both part of the Kalmar Union between 1397 and 1523, and a personal union between 1814 and 1905. The countries established diplomatic relations in 1905, after the dissolution of the union.

Sweden has an embassy in Oslo and 14 honorary consulates, in Ålesund, Arendal, Bergen, Bodø, Hamar, Hammerfest, Kirkenes, Mandal, Moss, Narvik, Porsgrunn, Stavanger, Tromsø and Trondheim. Norway has an embassy in Stockholm and three consulates, in Gothenburg, Malmö and Sundsvall.

Both countries are full members of the Council of Europe, Nordic Council, Joint Expeditionary Force and NATO.

== History ==
=== Early unions and relations with Danish Norway ===
Kalmar Union ca. 1400

Sweden and Norway were already partly linked by dynastic ties in the Middle Ages and early modern period. This led to the first personal union in 1319 under King Magnus Eriksson, which lasted until 1355. From 1397, both realms belonged to the Kalmar Union, an alliance of all three Nordic kingdoms under one monarch, initiated by Danish Queen Margaret I. This union broke apart in 1523 when Sweden seceded under Gustav Vasa, while Norway remained with Denmark. After that, rivalry and wars shaped the relationship between Sweden and Denmark-Norway. There were several border changes in Sweden's favor: In the Torstenson War, Sweden forced Norway to cede the provinces of Jämtland and Härjedalen in the Peace of Brömsebro in 1645, and in the Treaty of Roskilde in 1658, Norway lost Bohuslän, among other territories, to Sweden, and also briefly ceded the province of Trøndelag, which Norway regained in 1660.

During the Napoleonic Wars, Sweden changed alliances and lost Finland to Russia in 1809. Denmark-Norway, on the other hand, sided with Napoleon and suffered a heavy defeat in 1814. In January 1814, the Treaty of Kiel forced Denmark to cede Norway to Sweden. The Norwegians responded with a declaration of independence: on May 17, 1814, the Norwegian Constituent Assembly adopted a liberal constitution and elected the Danish prince Christian Frederik as king. However, Sweden – represented by Crown Prince Karl XIV John (Jean-Baptiste Bernadotte) – did not accept this and invaded Norway with around 50,000 soldiers in the summer of 1814. After brief fighting (including battles for the Fredriksten Fortress and at the Kjølberg Bridge), Norway surrendered in part. On August 14, 1814, an agreement was reached in the Convention of Moss. Norway recognized Swedish sovereignty but was allowed to retain its Eidsvoll Constitution (one of the most liberal of its time) with certain adjustments and enter into a personal union with Sweden. King Christian Frederik abdicated, and the Swedish king Charles XIII (known as Charles II in Norway) became joint head of state. This personal union, officially called the United Kingdoms of Sweden and Norway, began in November 1814 and was to last for almost a century.

=== Union between Sweden and Norway (1814–1905) ===
Flag of Sweden and Norway (1844–1905)

The Swedish-Norwegian Union was unique in that both states retained their own constitutions, parliaments, laws, administrations, currencies, and armies. They were united by the monarch—who was king of both Sweden and Norway—and a common foreign and consular policy, which was directed from Stockholm. Norway thus had internal autonomy, but found itself in a subordinate position in foreign policy. In the early phase of the union, the Norwegians grudgingly accepted this arrangement; in 1821, the Norwegian parliament (Storting) at least succeeded in having its own flag (with a union symbol in the corner) introduced. The royal governor's office, which was usually held by a Swede, was abolished in 1873 under pressure from Norway. Since then, the Norwegian head of government has held the title of Prime Minister and resided in Christiania (Oslo).

During the 19th century, nationalism grew stronger in Norway. There were several conflicts with Stockholm over Norwegian participation in foreign policy and debates about equal rights in the diplomatic service. The dispute over Norway's own consular service escalated towards the end of the century: Norway demanded the right to establish its own consulates abroad in order to represent its own trade interests, while Sweden refused. The Norwegian Storting passed several laws to establish an independent consular service, but King Oscar II consistently vetoed them. This crisis came to a head in 1905 when, on June 7, the Norwegian government under Christian Michelsen resigned en masse after the king again refused to confirm a consular law. Since Oscar II was unable (and unwilling) to appoint a new Norwegian government, the Storting unilaterally declared that the king was “no longer able to perform his duties as King of Norway,” thereby proclaiming the dissolution of the union. In Norway, a referendum on August 13, 1905, confirmed the separation by an overwhelming majority: 368,208 voters voted in favor of ending the union, with only 184 against (women, who did not yet have the right to vote at that time, also expressed their support en masse in separate signature campaigns).

After several weeks of tense diplomatic contacts – both sides even mobilized troops on the border – negotiations on the terms of separation took place in the Swedish city of Karlstad. On September 23, 1905, the delegations agreed on a compromise, the Treaty of Karlstad, thereby preventing war. Sweden agreed to respect Norway's decision, but demanded, among other things, that the border fortresses (such as Fredriksten Fortress) be demolished as a security measure. King Oscar II subsequently officially recognized Norway as an independent state and renounced the Norwegian throne on October 26, 1905. Norway rejected an offer to appoint a Swedish prince as the new Norwegian king. Instead, in a separate vote, the Norwegian people elected Prince Carl of Denmark as king, who ascended the throne as Haakon VII on November 25, 1905. The peaceful resolution of the crisis—not a single shot was fired—was praised internationally as a civilized precedent.

=== Relations after 1905 ===
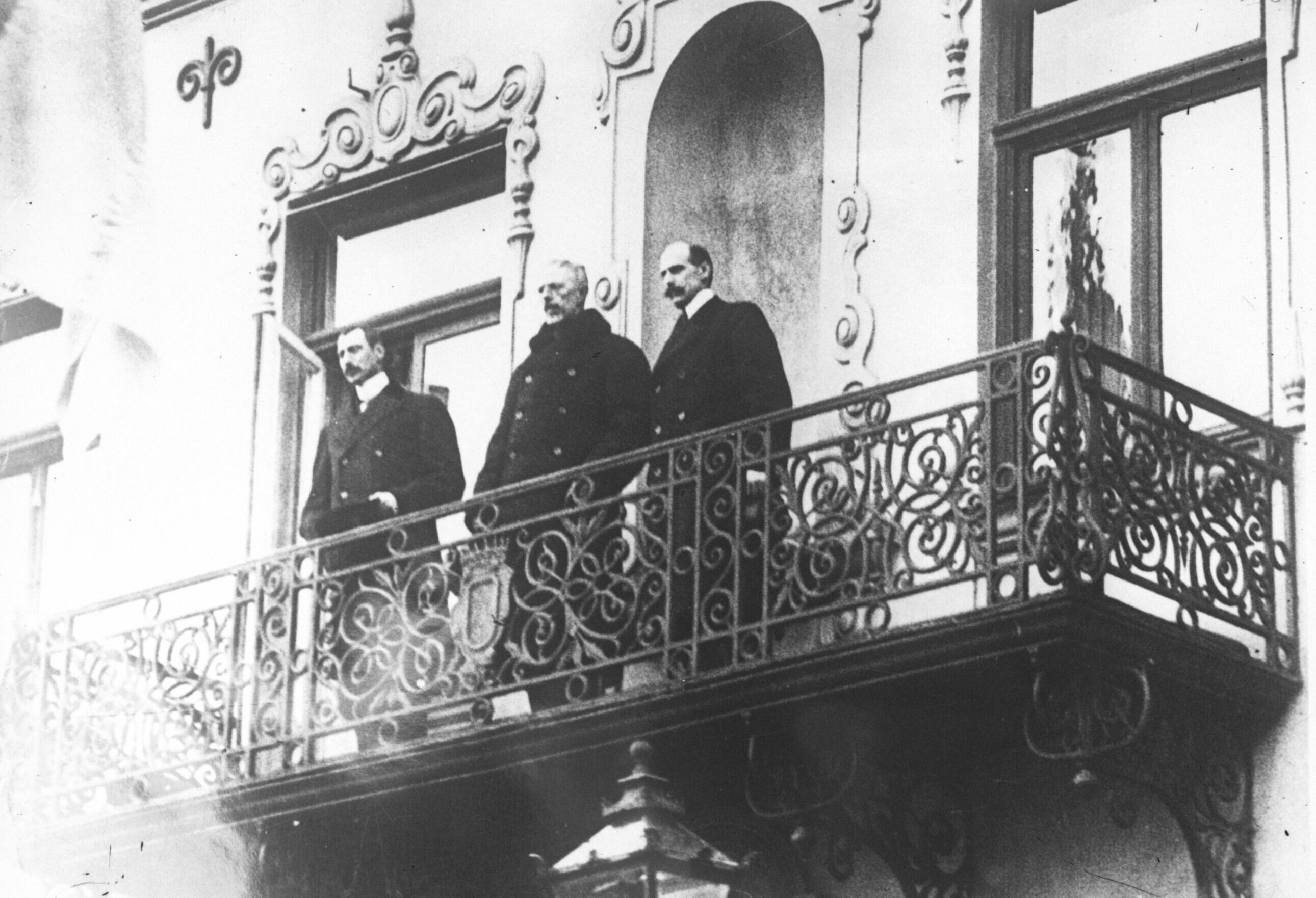
Meeting of Haakon VII (Norway), Gustav V (Sweden), and Christian X (Denmark) in Malmö (1914)

In the years that followed, Sweden and Norway signed a friendship treaty (1907) and Norway and Sweden remained in the Scandinavian Monetary Union until 1914. Although a certain mutual scepticism remained in the politically conservative camp in both countries, friendly relations soon prevailed. In the First World War, both Sweden and Norway declared their neutrality; efforts were made to settle trade issues jointly and to alleviate bottlenecks together. While Norway was occupied by Nazi troops in 1940, Sweden maintained its neutrality during the Second World War. Nevertheless, Sweden supported the Norwegians in subtle ways: Norwegian refugees found refuge in Sweden, and some Norwegians could train militarily on Swedish soil to liberate their homeland. After 1945, ties continued to strengthen. Both countries joined the United Nations in 1946 and, together with Denmark, Iceland, and Finland, founded the Nordic Council in 1952. Although they took different paths in terms of security policy – Norway was one of the founding members of NATO in 1949, while Sweden pursued a policy of non-aligned neutrality – this had little impact on bilateral cooperation. During the Cold War, Stockholm and Oslo worked closely together to build trust between NATO and the Eastern Bloc and remained closely intertwined economically and culturally.

An important step toward economic integration between the two countries was the introduction of the Nordic Passport Union (1954) and Norway's subsequent participation in the EFTA, while Sweden joined the EU in 1995. The open border and linguistic similarities facilitated mobility: tens of thousands of Swedes and Norwegians live and work in the neighboring country, which has created family and social ties. The countries also emphasized their closeness at the state level. In the 21st century, relations remained excellent. Both countries share values such as democracy, social welfare, and often act in union. They cooperate closely on energy issues (e.g., interconnection of electricity grids) and on environmental and climate protection in the far north. When Sweden abandoned its non-aligned security policy in the wake of the Russian attack on Ukraine in 2022 and applied to join NATO, Norway expressly welcomed this. Both countries have cooperated lately in Northern Europe to strengthen their defense readiness against Russia.

== Economic relations ==
The economies of Sweden and Norway are closely intertwined. Sweden is one of Norway's most important trading partners: in 2023, around 7.7% of Norwegian exports went to Sweden, and around 10.8% of Norwegian imports came from Sweden. Conversely, Norway is also one of Sweden's largest export markets – trade is dominated by energy and raw materials from Norway and industrial products from Sweden. Norway traditionally supplies petroleum and natural gas, electrical energy (hydropower) and fishery products to Sweden, while Sweden mainly exports machinery, vehicles, chemical products and consumer goods to Norway. Trade benefits from Norway's participation in the EU single market via the European Economic Area (EEA). There are virtually no customs barriers and the border can be crossed freely. Both countries have a long tradition of cross-border economic cooperation. There have been several cross-border mergers in heavy industry and the banking sector. For example, the Swedish car manufacturer Volvo also has a strong presence in Norway, while Norwegian companies (e.g. in the energy sector) invest in Sweden.

The close economic ties are also evident in everyday life: thousands of Norwegians regularly visit Swedish border towns to shop (“Harrytur”), because certain goods (such as food and alcohol) are cheaper in Sweden. Conversely, many Swedes commute to Norway for work, particularly in the service sector, where wages are often higher.

== Cultural relations ==
Culturally, Sweden and Norway have traditionally been closely linked. Both countries share a Scandinavian heritage, and Norwegian and Swedish are closely related languages that are largely mutually intelligible. This linguistic and cultural proximity has historically led to lively exchanges in literature, art, and science. The royal families of both countries are in close contact; even today, the Scandinavian monarchies are related and pay mutual visits. Official cultural cooperation takes place within the framework of the Nordic Culture Fund, in particular through the Nordic Council, which promotes mutual cultural relations. There are numerous joint cultural projects, such as the Nordic Music and Literature Prize awarded annually by the Nordic Council, in which Swedish and Norwegian contributions are often prominently represented.

== Diaspora ==
There are around 44,773 Swedes living in Norway and 41,062 Norwegians living in Sweden.

== International border ==
Crossing the border between Sweden and Norway is relatively simple. No passport is required due to the Nordic Passport Union and there are no physical border obstructions. However, since Norway is not part of the European Union customs controls can be made if traveling by car to prohibit smuggling. Foreign citizens requiring visa to either state are not allowed to cross the border legally without applying for visa again. There are no restrictions on non-felon Swedish and Norwegian people's rights to live in the neighbouring country.

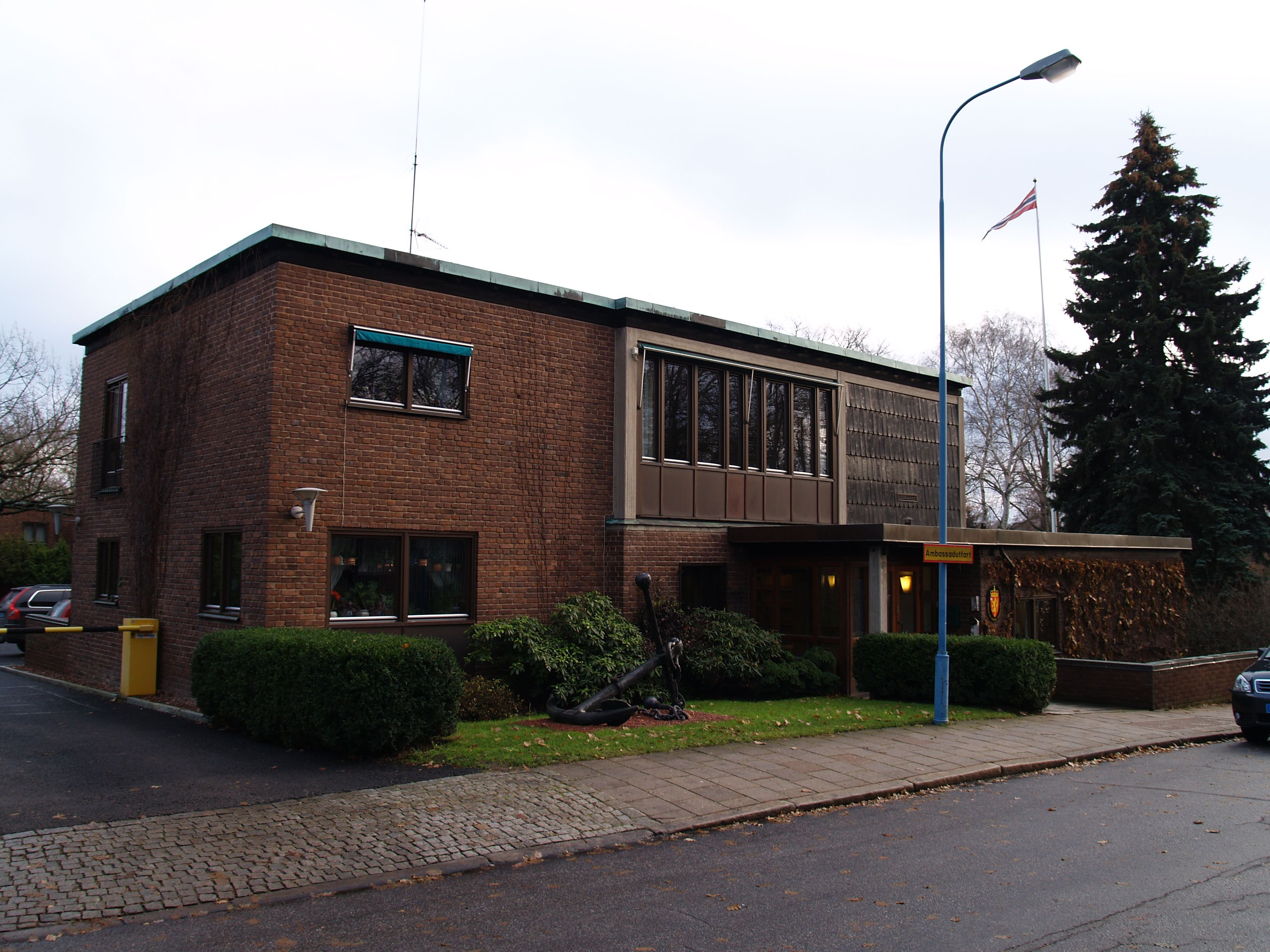
Embassy of Norway, Stockholm

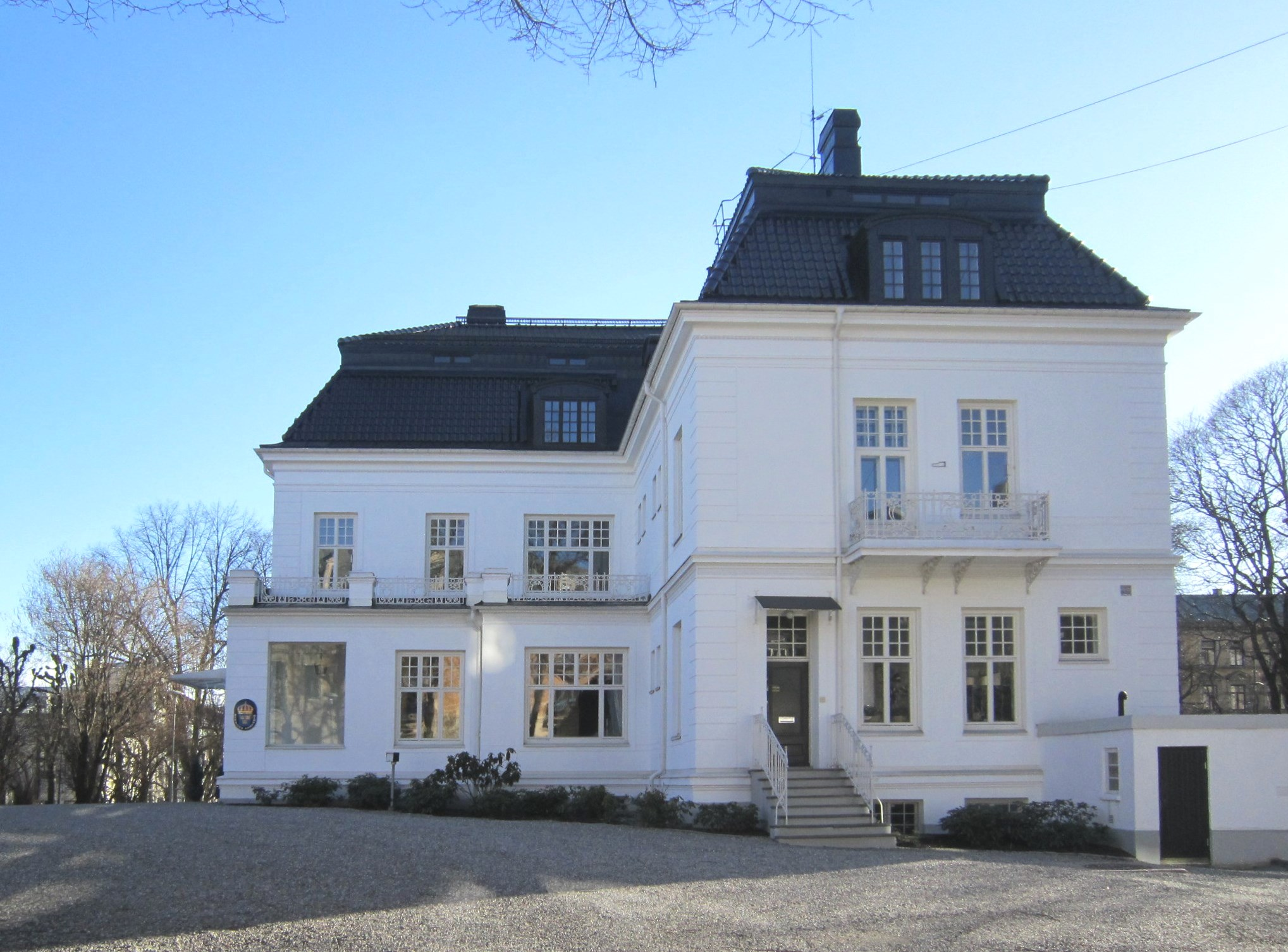
Embassy of Sweden, Oslo

== NATO ==
While Norway was one of the founding members of NATO, Sweden has only been a member since 2024. In 2022, Sweden and Finland both sought membership as a consequence of the Russian invasion of Ukraine. While Finland's entry took place mid-2023, Sweden's entry was prolonged by multiple hurdles but was finally approved early 2024 and officially joined on March 7, 2024.

== See also ==
- Foreign relations of Norway
- Foreign relations of Sweden
- Union between Sweden and Norway
- Norwegian Swedes
- Swedes in Norway
- Sweden–NATO relations
- Denmark–Sweden relations
