= Sven Allard =

Swedish diplomat

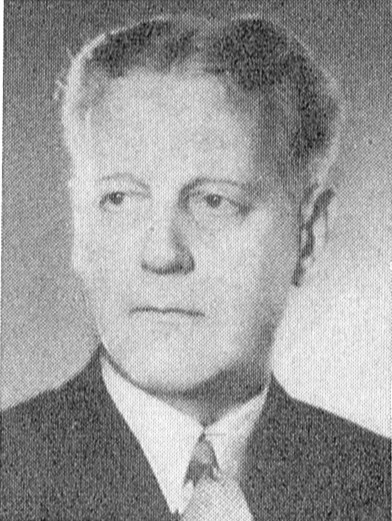
- Born: 6 July 1896; Tjällmo, Sweden
- Died: 17 August 1975 (aged 79); Tjällmo, Sweden
- Education: Uppsala University
- Occupation: Diplomat
- Years active: 1921–1964
- Spouse: Margareta Silfverschiöld (m. 1933)
- Children: 2

Sven Allard (6 July 1896 – 17 August 1975) was a Swedish diplomat. Allard began his diplomatic career as an attaché at the Ministry for Foreign Affairs in Stockholm in 1921, serving in various roles in Warsaw, Riga, and other cities throughout the 1920s and 1930s. He played a significant role in the Swedish-British trade agreement negotiations and later served as first legation secretary in several capitals, including Rome and Paris. In December 1943, he became Sweden's first envoy to Chungking, China, after a long gap in diplomatic relations, and worked on dismantling extraterritorial rights concerning Swedish interests. After his time in China, he served as a trade treaty negotiator and was envoy in Bucharest, Budapest, and Prague. In 1956, he was appointed Sweden's ambassador in Vienna, where he served until 1964 and participated in the International Atomic Energy Agency. Following this, he represented Sweden at the Food and Agriculture Organization in Rome and published a reflective book on his Vienna experiences in 1965.

== Early life ==
Allard was born on 6 July 1896 on the farm Klofstenalund (Lund) in Tjällmo, Östergötland County, Sweden, the son of Joel Andersson and his wife Maria Allard. He passed studentexamen in Linköping in 1914 and received a Bachelor of Arts degree from Uppsala University in 1918 and a Candidate of Law degree in 1920.

== Career ==
Allard was employed as an attaché at the Ministry for Foreign in Stockholm in 1921 and served in Warsaw in 1922, as well as in Riga, Reval, and Kovno that same year. He worked at the Ministry for Foreign Affairs in 1925, was acting second legation secretary in Brussels and The Hague in 1926, and became second secretary at the Ministry in 1927. He served as vice-consul in London in 1931 (acting in 1930) and as first legation secretary in Warsaw in 1932. Allard was secretary during the Swedish-British trade agreement negotiations from 1932 to 1933, first legation secretary in Rome in 1933, in Paris in 1934, and trade councilor there the same year. He then served as legation councilor and chargé d'affaires in Athens in 1938, Ankara from 1939 to 1940, and in Sofia in 1941. He represented the Swedish government for the relief efforts during the Great Famine in Greece from 1942 to 1943.

In December 1943, Allard was appointed as envoy in Chongqing, becoming Sweden's first diplomat in the capital of free China. Previously, Sweden had been accredited to Chiang Kai-shek through the Swedish legation in Shanghai until the city was occupied by the Japanese. The position of envoy to Chiang Kai-shek had been vacant for several years, leaving Sweden without diplomatic relations with the Chinese Nationalist Government. It wasn't until June 1944 that Allard could begin his journey to China aboard the ship Sagoland, traveling to Lisbon and then via Portuguese East Africa. His assignment in China included the task of dismantling the special extraterritorial rights concerning Swedish interests. These rights encompassed specific economic and legal privileges, notably in the well-known international concessions in Shanghai, which had already been abolished by most other countries.

Allard served at the Ministry for Foreign Affairs as a trade treaty negotiator from 1947 to 1949 and was envoy to Bucharest, Budapest, and Sofia in 1949. On 1 March 1949, he presented his credentials in Bucharest to Professor Constantin Ion Parhon, President of Romania's Supreme Council. He presented his credentials in Sofia on 5 April 1950.

He served as envoy in Prague and Budapest from 1951 to 1954, and in Vienna in 1954. He presented his credentials to President Theodor Körner on 20 March 1954. In August 1956, an agreement was reached between the Swedish and Austrian governments to elevate their respective legations to embassies. Consequently, the diplomatic rank changed from envoy extraordinary and minister plenipotentiary to ambassador. Allard was appointed as Sweden's ambassador in Vienna and presented his credentials to President Theodor Körner in September of that same year. During his time in Vienna, he was also part of the Swedish delegation to the International Atomic Energy Agency, serving as a deputy and advisor.

He served as ambassador in Vienna until 1964. After that, he moved to Rome, where he was a Swedish government representative at the Food and Agriculture Organization in 1964. The following year, he published the book Diplomat in Vienna, which reflected on his ten years as Sweden's envoy in Vienna.

== Personal life ==
On 10 April 1933, Allard married in London to Baroness Margareta Silfverschiöld (1904–1987), the daughter of Chief Chamberlain (överstekammarjunkare), Baron Otto Silfverschiöld and Ingeborg von Horn. They had two children: Embassy Counsellor Sven-Otto Allard (born 1934) and Consul General Nils-Urban Allard (1936–2017).

== Death ==
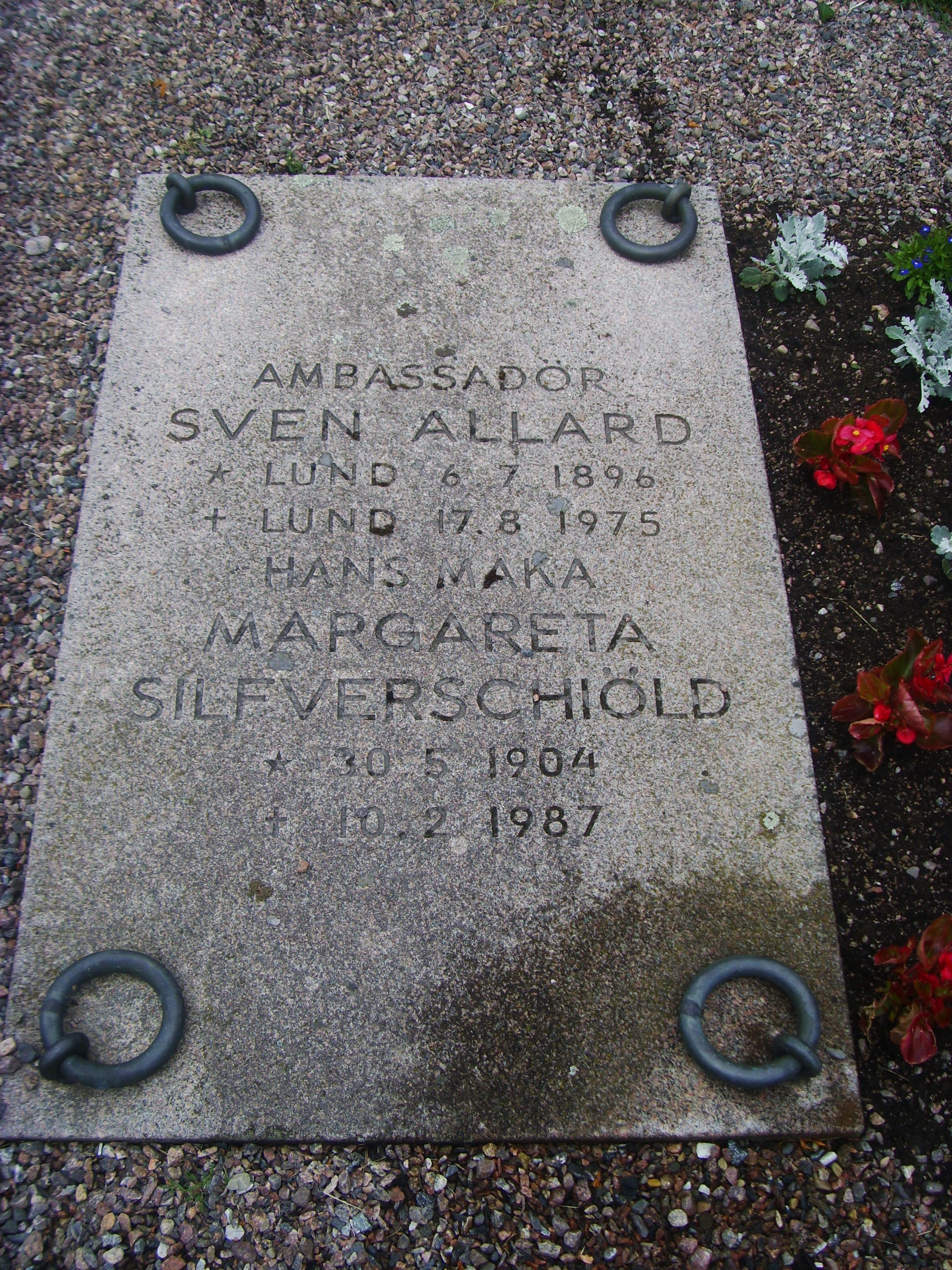
The gravestone of Sven Allard and his wife Margareta at Tjällmo Cemetery.

Allard died on 17 August 1975 on the same farm in Tjällmo where he was born. He was interred on 27 August 1975 in Tjällmo Cemetery at Tjällmo Church.

== Awards and decorations ==
- (Sweden) Commander Grand Cross of the Order of the Polar Star (4 June 1960)
- (Sweden) Commander of the Order of the Polar Star (6 June 1947)
- Grand Decoration of Honour in Gold for Services to the Republic of Austria (23 March 1960)
- (Greece) Grand Cross of the Order of the Phoenix
- (China) Order of Brilliant Star
- (Netherlands) Grand Officer of the Order of Orange-Nassau
- (Italy) 1st Class of the Order of the Star of Italian Solidarity
- (Germany) 1st Class of the Order of the German Eagle
- (Belgium) Officer of the Order of the Crown
- (France) Officer of the Legion of Honour
- (Latvia) Officer of the Order of the Three Stars
- Knight of the Order of the White Rose of Finland

== Bibliography ==
- Allard, Sven (1974). Stalin und Hitler: die sowjetrussische Aussenpolitik 1930-1941 [Stalin and Hitler: Soviet Russian foreign policy 1930-1941] (in German). Bern: Francke. SELIBR 107027.
- Allard, Sven (1970). Stalin och Hitler: en studie i sovjetrysk utrikespolitik 1930-41 [Stalin and Hitler: A Study in Soviet Russian Foreign Policy 1930-41] (in Swedish). Stockholm: Norstedt. SELIBR 8080761.
- Allard, Sven (1970). Russia and the Austrian state treaty: a case study of Soviet policy in Europe. University Park ...: Penn State University Press. SELIBR 46290.
- Allard, Sven (1966). Miehitysajan loppunäytös Wienissä: ruotsalaisen diplomaatin muistelmia [The end of the occupation period in Vienna: memoirs of a Swedish diplomat] (in Finnish). Porvoo: W. Söderström OY. SELIBR 805289.
- Allard, Sven (1965). Ryskt utspel i Wien [Russian outing in Vienna] (in Swedish). Stockholm: Norstedt. SELIBR 8074962.
- Allard, Sven (1965). Diplomat in Wien: Erlebnisse, Begegnungen und Gedanken um den österreichischen Staatsvertrag [Diplomat in Vienna: Experiences, encounters and thoughts about the Austrian State Treaty] (in German). Köln: Wissenschaft und Politik. SELIBR 819114.

Diplomatic posts
Preceded by None¹	Envoy of Sweden to China; 1943–1947	Succeeded by Henrik Ramel as Chargé d'affaires
Preceded by Patrik Reuterswärd	Envoy of Sweden to Romania; 1949–1951	Succeeded by Rolf Sohlman
Preceded by Patrik Reuterswärd	Envoy of Sweden to Bulgaria; 1949–1951	Succeeded by Rolf Sohlman
Preceded by Hugo Tamm as Chargé d'affaires	Envoy of Sweden to Hungary; 1949–1954	Succeeded by Carl Olof Gisle
Preceded by Wilhelm Winther	Envoy of Sweden to Czechoslovakia; 1951–1954	Succeeded by Carl Olof Gisle
Preceded by Kurt-Allan Belfrage	Envoy/ambassador of Sweden to Austria; 1954–1964	Succeeded by Karl-Gustav Lagerfelt
Notes and references
1. The envoy position was vacant since Johan Beck-Friis left China in 1939.
