= Lis Asklund =

Swedish sex educator

- Lis Asklund circa 1986
- Born: 23 March 1913
- Died: 12 January 2006 (aged 92); Stockholm, Sweden
- Occupations: Sex educator, presenter, and author
- Spouse: Erik Asklund (div. 1980)
- Children: Malin, Jonas

Louise Viveka Ulrika Asklund, (born Lagercrantz, known by the nickname Lis), (23 March 1913 – 12 January 2006) was a Swedish sex educator, television and radio presenter, and author.

== Early life and marriage ==
Born in 1913, Lis Asklund's father was a former naval officer who ran a peat factory who later ran an insurance company and a bank. She was one of five children that her parents had together, with her father also later having three children after remarrying. Her brother, Olof Lagercrantz, went on to become a prominent author. Her father wished his daughters to gain education and opportunities to his sons, and Lis Asklund gained her school-leaving certificate at the Wallin school in Stockholm after moving there.

From 1933 to 1936 Lis Asklund trained as a nurse with the Swedish Red Cross at Sabbatsberg hospital, before going on to spend a year in London with the Florence Nightingale International Foundation, where she studied a broad range of subjects related to sociology, psychology, ethics, philosophy, and healthcare. She also gained practical experience working in the poor East End of London. After returning to Sweden in 1938, Lis Asklund became one of only two hospital almoners (essentially social workers working within hospitals) working in Sweden at the time. She continued as an almoner until 1949.

In the same year as starting work as an almoner in Sweden, Lis Asklund also met Erik Asklund, with whom she was married in 1940. Erik Asklund was an author, and their social circle included a number of Swedish literary and cultural figures of the time, including Ivar Lo-Johansson, Nils Ferlin, Gunnar Ekelöf, Stig Åsberg, and Tora Dahl. The couple went on to have a daughter (Malin) in 1946 and a son (Jonas) in 1951. Lis Asklund later described her marriage to Erik Asklund as unhappy in her 1986 biographical book Uppbrott (Departure), and they were eventually divorced in 1980.

== Career in sexual health ==
The first law legalising abortion in Sweden had been introduced under the Abortion Act of 1938, however this only allowed abortion under very limited circumstances. This had led to women seeking dangerous illegal back-street abortionists as they were not able to have legal abortions. The feminist journalist Elise Ottesen-Jensen (known by her pen-name Ottar) approached Lis Asklund in 1940 to establish an office for the Swedish Association for Sexuality Education (Riksförbund för sexuell upplysning) where women could go for advice and could therefore be steered away from dangerous abortionists. Part of this involved helping women apply to have an abortion, though in the early years many applications were rejected. Lis Asklund worked voluntarily in this office in the evenings alongside her work as an almoner. Two years after the establishment of this office, Asklund established a further sexual health advice centre for Stockholm city, together with a colleague.

Lis Asklund campaigned for the relaxation of abortion laws in Sweden and was a witness before a census enquiry on abortions, and later the 1950 official enquiry into abortion. Her efforts bore partial fruit in 1946 when socio-economic grounds were allowed as a reason for having an abortion, which increased the number of successful applications for abortions to roughly half. In 1975 abortion in Sweden became available on demand up to the 18th week of pregnancy.

== Broadcasting career and later life ==
In 1956, Lis Asklund began appearing on the weekly radio programme Människor emellan (Between People) broadcast by the Swedish Broadcasting Corporation. On the show, Asklund answered letters from listeners asking for advice about various personal problems, such as, for example, a married man with a family who claimed to be addicted to pornography. Asklund appeared on the programme until 1968, receiving roughly 100 letters a week (80% from women) and reaching a weekly audience of roughly 700,000 people.

Asklund also appeared on other radio programmes, including a 1959 report into conditions at the Eugeniahem disabled children's home in Stockholm where she reported harsh conditions and strict punishments being meted out to children for minor infractions. A state commission tried to stop the broadcasting of the programme, howevert this attempt instead resulted in the Swedish radio act being amended to include a specific mandate to broadcast socially important works. The report was followed by an official inquiry in 1961 which confirmed her findings, and the home was subsequently shut down. Asklund also hosted a television fundraiser in 1965 that funded the construction of 300 homes for disabled people.

During the 1970s Asklund was introduced to the Fountain House model of treating mental illnesses in New York, where mental health issues are treated in the community in a clubhouse, rather than necessarily in a clinical setting. Asklund subsequently introduced the model to Scandinavia, starting the Swedish Fountain House Foundation in 1979, assisting in the founding of several branches within Sweden, and becoming an honorary member of two Swedish clubhouses.

Asklund was awarded the Socrates Prize in 1978. The prize was awarded for Asklund's "many years of socially critical activities as a reporter and producer on radio and television". Asklund had a number of books published during her life, including Vägen till mognad (The Road To Maturity) in 1966 with Torsten Wickbom which focused on equality of the sexes, Samtal är arbete (Conversations are work) on the importance of doctors talking to their patients, and her memoir Uppbrott in 1986.
