= Christian Günther =

Swedish diplomat (1886–1966)

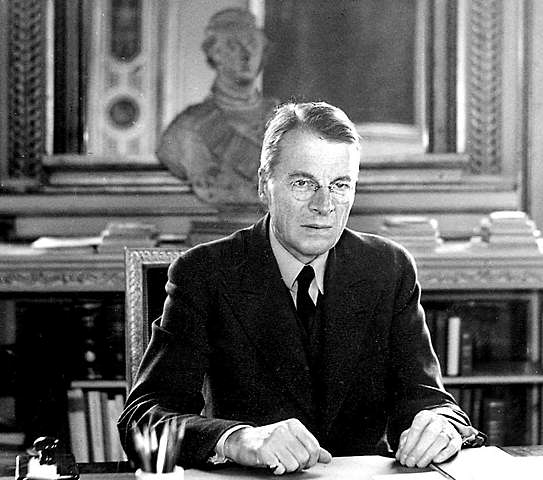
- Günther as foreign minister in 1940.

Envoy of Sweden to Italy
- In office 28 June 1946 – 21 April 1950
- Preceded by: Joen Lagerberg
- Succeeded by: Johan Beck-Friis

Minister for Foreign Affairs
- In office 13 December 1939 – 31 July 1945
- Monarch: Gustaf V
- Prime Minister: Per Albin Hansson
- Preceded by: Rickard Sandler
- Succeeded by: Östen Undén

Envoy of Sweden to Norway
- In office 26 November 1937 – 1939
- Preceded by: Torvald Höjer
- Succeeded by: Johan Beck-Friis

State Secretary for Foreign Affairs
- In office 30 November 1934 – 1937
- Preceded by: Carl Hamilton
- Succeeded by: Erik Boheman

Envoy of Sweden to Argentina, Chile, Paraguay, Uruguay
- In office 23 January 1931 – 1933
- Preceded by: Einar Ekstrand
- Succeeded by: Einar Modig

Personal details
- Born: Christian Ernst Günther; 3 December 1886 Stockholm, Sweden
- Died: 6 March 1966 (aged 79) Stockholm, Sweden
- Party: Independent
- Spouse: Ingrid Sjöberg (m. 1909)
- Children: 3
- Relatives: Einar Löfstedt (brother-in-law); Anders Österling (brother-in-law); Ingrid Arvidsson (niece); Per Lind (nephew)
- Education: Nya elementarskolan Uppsala University; Lund University
- Occupation: Diplomat

Christian Ernst Günther (5 December 1886 – 6 March 1966) was Swedish Minister for Foreign Affairs in the Hansson III Cabinet. The unity government was formed after the Soviet attack on Finland in November 1939, the Winter War, and it was dissolved on 31 July 1945.

Günther, whose father had been Swedish diplomat and whose grandfather briefly had been prime minister, had entered the civil service at the age of 30. He was eight years later transferred to the Foreign Ministry from the position as personal secretary of Prime Ministers Hjalmar Branting and Rickard Sandler. In the Foreign Ministry, he advanced in the 1930s to the position immediately beneath Foreign Minister Rickard Sandler, as Under-secretary of State for Foreign Affairs and then was Accredited as ambassador to Norway, where he intended to stay until retirement.

Günther's main achievement was to defend Sweden's neutrality during the Second World War, which made his country escape the fate of the occupied Norway and the defeated Finland. The dominant historiography for decades after the war ignored the Holocaust and used what it called the "small state realist" argument that neutrality and co-operation with Germany were necessary for survival since Germany was vastly more powerful. Concessions were limited and made only if the threat was too great, neutrality was bent but not broken, national unity was paramount and Sweden had the neutral right of trading with Germany. Swedish iron was needed by Germany, which had nothing to gain and much iron to lose by an invasion.

Sweden was run by a unity government, which included all major parties in the Riksdag.

== Personal background ==
Günther was hardly a typical representative for the diplomatic corps. Although a perpetual student of law, his ambitions were rather that of a writer, drama, lyrics and a few novels, not without some success. Unanimous testimony describes him as a man of unassuming ways, high intelligence and a bohemian personality, with a significant lack of ambition; he made his visits in the office as brief as possible. He was passionate for harness racing and had the nerves of a habitual gambler.

Günther represents the last generation of cultural Scandinavists, who were sympathetic to the relative political liberalism in Denmark and Norway. He was influenced from French and English thinking, unlike the ancien régimes of Austria, Prussia, and Russia. Beside that, he was virtually ignorant of the English-speaking world. Like many other liberal Swedes, he was untouched and rather alienated by Finland's political and cultural development after 1809, which was signified by a high regard for the autocratic Gustavian Constitution of 1772, the fervent anti-Germanic Fennomania and the bloody aftermath of the Civil War.

As a foreign minister, Günther favoured policies that were rather in the taste of pro-German Conservatives than of pro-Soviet Radicals. Both during the war and after the Allies' victory, he was the target of criticism, which chiefly argued that the nation's soul would have been better saved by a less indulgent position toward Nazi Germany and a more yielding attitude towards the Allies, even if that had resulted in a German invasion and occupation. Together with his aristocratic appearance and bourgeois upbringing, that has rendered him being sometimes characterized as a conservative. Günther himself would hardly have approved, as he was an ardent anti-Nazi; a religious sceptic; and, according to his wife, Ingrid, a cautious supporter of the Social Democrats.

Günther, who had distanced himself from the state church by a civil marriage, was buried in a civil funeral.

== Situation during appointment as Foreign Minister ==
A serious cabinet crisis in Stockholm put an end to his mission in Norway. The failure of Foreign Minister Rickard Sandler's policy, which had been characterized by high-profile diplomatic support for Finland without sufficient agreement from other Social Democratic ministers for concrete military actions outside of Sweden's borders, was starkly illuminated by the run-up to and the outbreak of the Winter War. The cabinet's refusal to authorize even limited military actions for the defence of de-militarized Åland before the war and, even more significantly, the waters between Åland and Stockholm, made Sandler's resignation unavoidable, but it was somewhat postponed because of the tense international situation.

The outbreak of the Winter War put Sweden in one of the worst political crises since the secession of Finland in 1809. A strong and vociferous public opinion demanded unlimited solidarity with Finland. However, a broad parliamentary majority opposed not only military support of Finland but also other actions that might put Sweden in danger of an invasion by either Nazi Germany or its ally, the Soviet Union.

To overcome the crisis, a National Unity Government was deemed essential, which proved difficult since the Conservative Party, led by Gösta Bagge, supported at least moderately-activist policies for the defence of Finland. To solve the difficulties, it was agreed to appoint a "non-political" Foreign Minister from among Sweden's top diplomats, which was thought to put the foreign policies in the firm grip of the party leaders in the cabinet, where they planned to broker compromises.

== Foreign minister ==
Günther left no memoirs, no diaries, very few personal letters of interest for historians, and actually remarkably few notes and writings from his time as Foreign Minister. Hence, an assessment of Günther must rely on the account of colleagues in the cabinet and in the Foreign Ministry.

As a Foreign Minister, Günther represented a stark contrast to Rickard Sandler's idealist policies. Günther's preferred line was a cautious realpolitik, which was adapted to the very limited options of a small country during a war between great power neighbours. Like many, maybe most, of his contemporary peers, he expected German culture to be inherently stronger than the Nazi barbarism. Thus, he did not subscribe to the idea of the world war as primarily a clash of democracy against fascism but rather as a traditional war on dominance of Continental Europe. In that light, a German victory over the Soviet Union, the latter being the latest appearance of Sweden's old arch-enemy, could not be perceived as particularly alarming. On that point, Günther was close to the most conservative cabinet members.

Günther coined the phrase "Finlands sak är vår" (English: The Finnish cause is ours) for a campaign to recruit Swedish volunteers to fight with Finland against the Soviet Union.

== In popular culture ==
In the Swedish television movie Four Days that shook Sweden - The Midsummer Crisis 1941 (Sveriges Television TV1, from 1988), his role is played by the Swedish character actor Sven Lindberg.

He is depicted in the 2026 movie The Swedish Connection, played by Olle Jansson, during the events leading up to the Rescue of the Danish Jews.

Diplomatic posts
Preceded by Einar Ekstrand	Envoy of Sweden to Argentina; 1931–1933	Succeeded by Einar Modig
Preceded by Einar Ekstrand	Envoy of Sweden to Chile; 1931–1933	Succeeded by Einar Modig
Preceded by Einar Ekstrand	Envoy of Sweden to Paraguay; 1931–1933	Succeeded by Einar Modig
Preceded by Einar Ekstrand	Envoy of Sweden to Uruguay; 1931–1933	Succeeded by Einar Modig
Preceded by Torvald Höjer	Envoy of Sweden to Norway; 1937–1939	Succeeded by Johan Beck-Friis
Preceded by Joen Lagerberg	Envoy of Sweden to Italy; 1946–1950	Succeeded by Johan Beck-Friis
Political offices
Preceded by Carl Hamilton	State Secretary for Foreign Affairs; 1934–1937	Succeeded by Erik Boheman
Preceded by Rickard Sandler	Swedish Minister for Foreign Affairs; 1939–1945	Succeeded by Östen Undén
