= Wilhelm Winther =

Swedish diplomat (1891–1983)

- Born: Otto Wilhelm Winther; 29 November 1891; Helsingborg, Sweden
- Died: 5 April 1983 (aged 91); Stockholm, Sweden
- Education: Lund University
- Occupation: Diplomat
- Years active: 1913–1967
- Spouse: Cornelia Kuylenstierna (m. 1922; died 1980)
- Children: 5

Otto Wilhelm Winther (29 November 1891 – 5 April 1983) was a Swedish diplomat whose career spanned over four decades, beginning at the Ministry for Foreign Affairs in 1916 and including postings in London, Kristiania (Oslo), Paris, Ankara, Sofia, Athens, Moscow, Buenos Aires, Montevideo, Asunción, Prague, and Madrid. He represented Sweden at major international conferences, headed key departments at the Foreign Ministry, led trade negotiations with Czechoslovakia and Spain, and served as ambassador to Spain from 1956 to 1958. In retirement, he chaired the Friends of the Post Museum Association until 1967, when he was made an honorary member.

== Early life ==
Winther was born on 29 November 1891 in Helsingborg, Sweden, the son of Otto Jönsson, a merchant, and his wife Christina (née Winther). He passed studentexamen in 1909 and received a Candidate of Law degree from Lund University in 1913.

== Career ==
Winther worked as a law clerk at Luggude Judicial District from 1913 to 1914. He was appointed attaché at the Ministry for Foreign Affairs in 1916, acting second secretary in 1917, and posted to the legation in London in 1918. He served as second legation secretary in London from 1919 to 1920, and as secretary to the minister for foreign affairs in 1920. In 1922 he became first legation secretary at the Foreign Ministry, and in 1923 was posted to Kristiania (Oslo). In 1924 he was appointed Head of the Political and Commercial Policy Department at the Foreign Ministry, and in 1925 served as delegate to the International Aviation Conference. He was counsellor at the legation in Paris in 1928, delegate to the Conference for the Abolition of Export and Import Restrictions in Paris in 1929, and to the Conference on the Marketing of Agricultural Products in Paris in 1931.

From 1931 to 1934 he was Sweden’s representative to the Bureau International des Expositions in Paris, and in 1933 a member of the International Council for German Refugees in Lausanne. In 1934 he became envoy to Ankara (Istanbul), Sofia, and Athens; in 1938 to Moscow; in 1940 to Buenos Aires, Montevideo, and Asunción; and in 1947 to Prague, where he also chaired the Swedish delegation in trade agreement negotiations with Czechoslovakia that year.

He was appointed envoy to Madrid in 1951, Sweden’s representative in trade negotiations with Spain from 1952 to 1956, and ambassador there from 1956 to 1958.

Winther had a keen interest in philately and in 1958 succeeded former Minister for Foreign Affairs Christian Günther as chairman of the Friends of the Post Museum Association (Föreningen Postmusei Vänner), a position he held until 1967, when he was made an honorary member.

== Personal life ==
In 1922, Winther married Cornelia Kuylenstierna (1897–1980), daughter of Major Osvald Kuylenstierna and Elisabeth (née Hammarberg). He was the father of Otto (1923–2012), Jan (1925–2014), Wiveka (1928–2007), Henry (1936–2002), and Christian (born 1940).

Mr. and Mrs. Winther owned Villa Fridhem in Särö, Kungsbacka Municipality, between 1939 and 1983.

== Death ==
Winther died on 5 April 1983 in Stockholm. He was interred on 27 May 1983 at Norra begravningsplatsen in Stockholm.

== Awards and decorations ==
=== Swedish ===
- (Sweden) Commander Grand Cross of the Order of the Polar Star (15 November 1948)
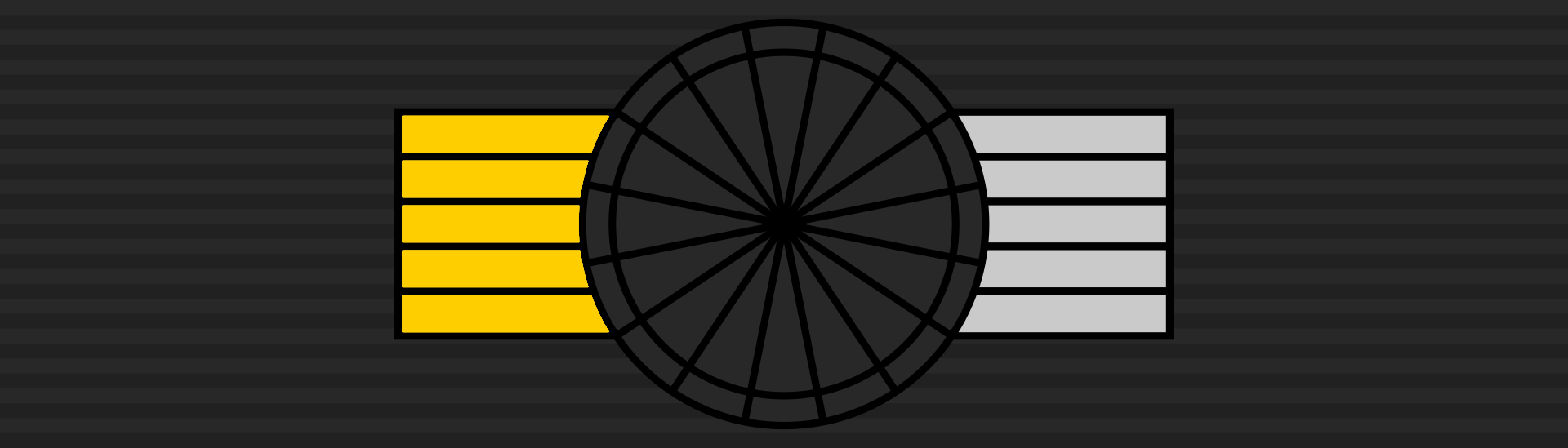
- (Sweden) Commander 1st Class of the Order of the Polar Star (5 June 1937)
- (Sweden) Knight of the Order of the Polar Star (1928)

=== Foreign ===
- (Bulgaria) Grand Cross of the Order of Civil Merit
- (Greece) Grand Cross of the Order of the Phoenix
- (Spain) Grand Cross of the Order of Isabella the Catholic
- Grand Cross of the Order of Merit of the Republic of Hungary
- Commander of the Order of the White Rose of Finland
- (France) Commander of the Order of the Black Star
- (Norway) Commander of the Order of St. Olav
- (France) Officer of the Legion of Honour
- (Netherlands) Officer of the Order of Orange-Nassau

Diplomatic posts
Preceded by Erik Boheman	Envoy of Sweden to Turkey; 1934–1937	Succeeded by Eric Gyllenstierna
Preceded by Erik Boheman	Envoy of Sweden to Greece; 1934–1937	Succeeded by Eric Gyllenstierna
Preceded by Erik Boheman	Envoy of Sweden to Bulgaria; 1934–1935	Succeeded by Patrik Reuterswärd
Preceded by Eric Gyllenstierna	Envoy of Sweden to Soviet Union; 1938–1940	Succeeded by Vilhelm Assarsson
Preceded by Einar Modig	Envoy of Sweden to Argentina; 1940–1946	Succeeded by Carl Olof Gisle
Preceded by Einar Modig	Envoy of Sweden to Uruguay; 1940–1946	Succeeded by Carl Olof Gisle
Preceded by Einar Modig	Envoy of Sweden to Paraguay; 1940–1946	Succeeded by Carl Olof Gisle
Preceded by Torsten Hammarström	Envoy of Sweden to Czechoslovakia; 1947–1950	Succeeded by Sven Allard
Preceded by Karl Ivan Westman	Envoy/Ambassador of Sweden to Spain; 1951–1958	Succeeded by Herbert Ribbing
