= Carl Olof Gisle =

Swedish diplomat (1900–1964)

- Born: 22 September 1900; Gothenburg, Sweden
- Died: 4 June 1964 (aged 63); Åryd, Sweden
- Education: Uppsala University; Göteborgs högre realläroverk
- Occupation: Diplomat
- Years active: 1924–1959
- Spouse: Cecilia Lilliehöök (m. 1936)
- Children: 4

Carl Olof Gisle (22 September 1900 – 4 June 1964) was a Swedish diplomat. He pursued a distinguished diplomatic career following his legal studies at Uppsala University. After completing his judicial apprenticeship in the mid-1920s, he joined the Swedish Ministry for Foreign Affairs in 1928. Over the next decade, he held postings in Madrid, Lisbon, London, and Warsaw, and gradually advanced through the ranks in Stockholm, becoming first secretary in 1936.

Gisle played an important role during the Second World War. Posted to London from 1939, he served as acting commercial counsellor and later legation counsellor, participating in all wartime negotiations between Sweden and the British government.

After the war he was appointed envoy to several regions: first to Buenos Aires, Asunción, and Montevideo (1946), then to Pretoria (1949). He chaired the Swedish delegation at the Torquay Round of GATT (1950–51), and in 1954 became envoy to Prague and Budapest. Throughout his career, he also served as a key figure in Sweden's trade policy negotiations with numerous countries. He left active service in 1959 at his own request.

== Early life ==
Gisle was born on 22 September 1900 in Gothenburg, Sweden, the son of industrialist and forestry advocate Edwin Ohlsson (1866–1956) and Torinna (Tora) Ferm (1865–1936). His father rose from modest beginnings to become a leading figure in the Swedish timber and sawmill industry. He founded and led several major companies and was the driving force behind the creation of Skogssällskapet, significantly shaping modern Swedish forest management.

Carl Olof was the brother of Major Hakon Gisle of Åryd and Margit Gisle, proprietor of Vallens farm in Våxtorp, Halland. He completed his studentexamen (upper-secondary final exam) in 1919, earned a Bachelor of Arts degree at Uppsala University in 1922, and a Candidate of Law degree in 1924.

== Career ==
Gisle served his judicial apprenticeship in the Östra Värend and Sunnerbo judicial districts from 1924 to 1927, worked at the Svea Court of Appeal in 1928, and became an attaché at the Ministry for Foreign Affairs later that year. He served in Madrid and Lisbon in 1929, London in 1930, Warsaw in 1931, and then returned to the Foreign Ministry in 1932. He was appointed acting second secretary in 1934, second secretary in 1935, and acting first secretary in 1936. In 1938 he became first secretary of the Swedish legation in Berlin, and in 1939 he served as acting commercial counsellor in London, where he was appointed legation Counsellor in 1944 (acting since 1941). While in London, he took part in all wartime negotiations with the British government.

He served as envoy in Buenos Aires, Asunción, and Montevideo in 1946, and in Pretoria in 1949. He chaired the Swedish delegation at the Torquay Round of the General Agreement on Tariffs and Trade (GATT) from 1950 to 1951, and became envoy in Prague and Budapest in 1954. He also served as secretary or representative in trade policy negotiations with numerous countries. At his own request, Gisle left active service on 30 September 1959 and was placed on reserve.

== Personal life ==
In 1936, Gisle married Cecilia Lilliehöök (1913–2006), the daughter of Colonel Bertil Lilliehöök and Eleonor Berndes. They had four children: Peter (born 1937), Catharina (born 1938), Anna (born 1941), and Caroline (born 1948).

== Death ==
Gisle died on 4 June 1964 in Åryd, Sweden. The funeral service was held on 10 June 1964 in Hemmesjö Church.

In an obituary, Ambassador Gunnar Hägglöf described him as "a man of sharp intelligence and great sensitivity. He did not like to be in the spotlight. He preferred to hide his rich personality and warm heart behind a reserved exterior. But to his friends he revealed his true self — a distinctive and richly nuanced character, seasoned with a peppery sense of humor and irony."

== Awards and decorations ==
=== Swedish ===
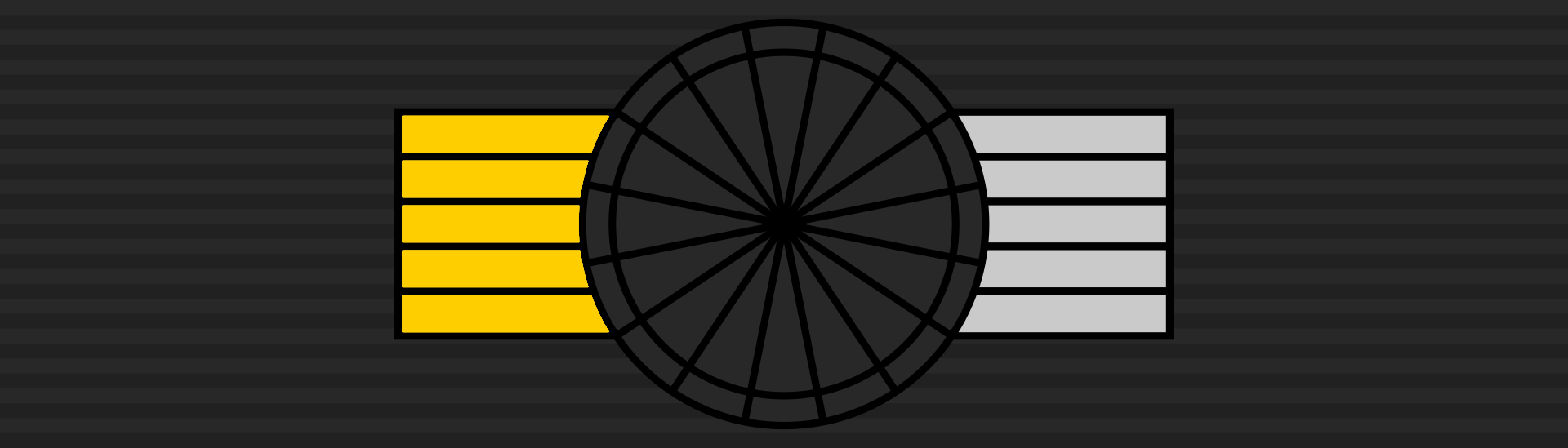
- (Sweden) Commander 1st Class of the Order of the Polar Star (6 June 1953)
- (Sweden) Commander of the Order of the Polar Star (15 November 1949)
- (Sweden) Knight of the Order of the Polar Star (1944)
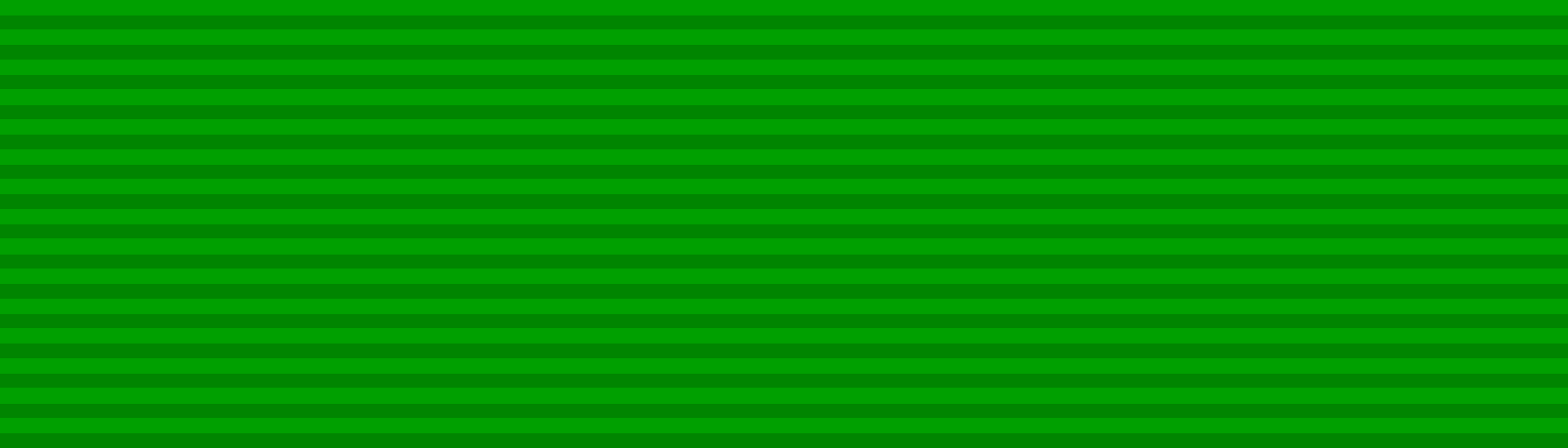
- (Sweden) Knight of the Order of Vasa (1941)

=== Foreign ===
- Commander of the Order of the Crown of Italy
- (Belgium) Officer of the Order of Leopold II
- (Chile) Officer of the Order of Merit
- (Poland) Officer of the Order of Polonia Restituta
- (Portugal) Knight of the Military Order of Christ (3 September 1931)
- (Spain) Knight of the Order of Civil Merit
- Decoration of Honour for Services to the Republic of Austria

== Honours ==
- Honorary member of the National University of La Plata (1947)
- Honorary chairman of the Argentine-Swedish Cultural Institute (1947)

Diplomatic posts
Preceded by Wilhelm Winther	Envoy of Sweden to Argentina; 1945–1949	Succeeded by Herbert Ribbing
Preceded by Wilhelm Winther	Envoy of Sweden to Paraguay; 1945–1949	Succeeded by Herbert Ribbing
Preceded by Wilhelm Winther	Envoy of Sweden to Uruguay; 1945–1949	Succeeded by Herbert Ribbing
Preceded by Harry Eriksson	Envoy of Sweden to South Africa; 1948–1954	Succeeded by Alexis Aminoff
Preceded by Sven Allard	Envoy of Sweden to Czechoslovakia; 1954–1959	Succeeded by Karl Fredrik Almqvist
Preceded by Sven Allard	Envoy of Sweden to Hungary; 1954–1959	Succeeded by Karl Fredrik Almqvist
