= Charlotte Wrangberg =

Swedish journalist and diplomat

Her Excellency Charlotte Wrangberg OMRI
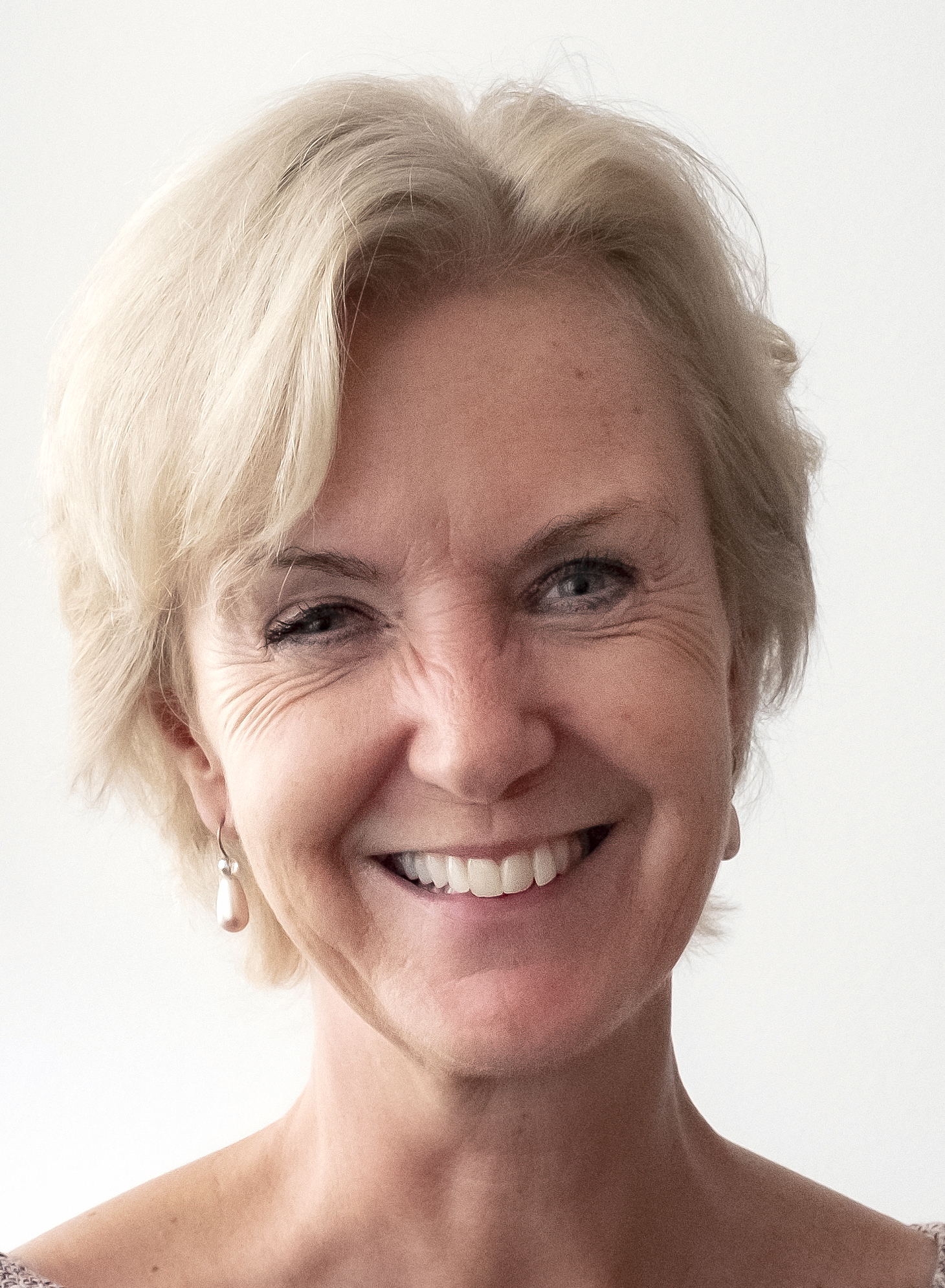
- Wrangberg in 2020

Ambassador of Sweden to Estonia
- Incumbent
- Assumed office 2024
- Preceded by: Ingrid Tersman

Ambassador of Sweden to Denmark
- In office 1 September 2020 – 14 August 2024
- Preceded by: Fredrik Jörgensen
- Succeeded by: Hans Wallmark

Ambassador of Sweden to Greece
- In office 2013–2017
- Preceded by: Håkan Malmqvist
- Succeeded by: Charlotte Sammelin

Ambassador of Sweden to Argentina
- In office 2010–2013
- Preceded by: Arne Rodin
- Succeeded by: Gufran Al-Nadaf

Personal details
- Born: Britt Charlotte Wrangberg; 17 June 1959 (age 66) Scania, Sweden
- Occupation: Journalist and diplomat

Britt Charlotte Wrangberg (born 17 June 1959) is a Swedish journalist and diplomat who became the incumbent ambassador to Denmark since 2020, Greece from 2013 to 2017, and Argentina from 2010 to 2013.

== Early life and education ==
Wrangberg spent her early years mostly in Denmark, attended school in Lund, and was raised in Skåne. As a journalist at Kvällsposten in Malmö, she covered the discussion leading up to the decision to build the Öresund Bridge. After that, she switched from covering foreign affairs to working on foreign policy.

== Diplomatic career ==
Wrangberg held positions at the embassies in Madrid, Mexico City, and Pretoria. She has also worked in the Africa Unit, the Consular and Civil Affairs Unit, and the European Union Unit of the Department of Foreign Affairs (DFA). She served as ambassador from 2010 to 2013 in Asunción and Montevideo, then from 2013 to 2017 in Athens. Wrangberg oversaw protocol at the Ministry of Foreign Affairs from 2017 until 2020. She moved to Denmark as an ambassador in September 2020 after serving as the Foreign Ministry's chief of protocol.

=== Greece ===
On 8 October 2015, Wrangberg met with the Alternate Foreign Minister for European Affairs, Nikos Xydakis, in the Foreign Ministry to address matters of common and European concern. Both parties mentioned the good cooperation between their countries throughout the meeting, which was held in a cordial environment. She concluded by expressing the personal interest of Swedish Prime Minister Stefan Löfvén in labor relations and social policy matters.

=== Denmark ===
On 7 May 2020, the Swedish government named Wrangberg ambassador to Copenhagen. September marks her start of her new role. On 9 September, Wrangberg presented her the credentials after beginning work earlier on the 1st and working for the Danish Queen Margrethe II. She has spent the first portion of that time getting to know the embassy's personnel and procedures, and at this point she was beginning to orient herself more externally and make connections with the outside world.

== Honours ==
- Grand Officer of the Order of Merit of the Italian Republic (OMRI; 14 January 2019)

Diplomatic posts
Preceded by Arne Rodin	Ambassador of Sweden to Argentina; 2010–2013	Succeeded by Gufran Al-Nadaf
Preceded by Arne Rodin	Ambassador of Sweden to Paraguay; 2010–2013	Succeeded by Gufran Al-Nadaf
Preceded by Arne Rodin	Ambassador of Sweden to Uruguay; 2010–2013	Succeeded by Gufran Al-Nadaf
Preceded by Håkan Malmqvist	Ambassador of Sweden to Greece; 2013–2017	Succeeded by Charlotte Sammelin
Preceded by Fredrik Jörgensen	Ambassador of Sweden to Denmark; 2020–2024	Succeeded by Hans Wallmark
Preceded by Ingrid Tersman	Ambassador of Sweden to Estonia; 2024–present	Succeeded by Incumbent
