= Mats Foyer =

Swedish diplomat (born 1954)

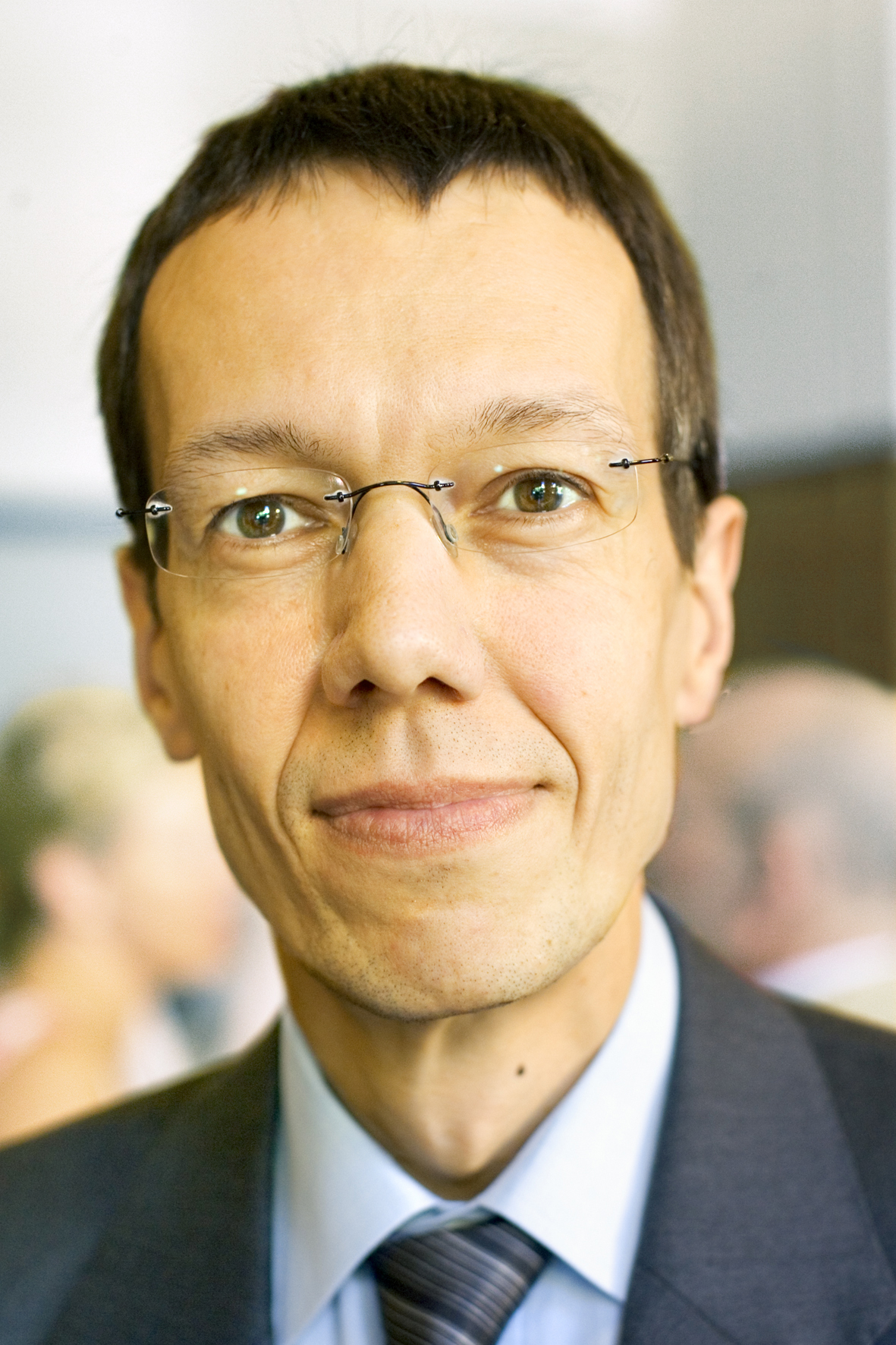
Mats Foyer, August 2005

Mats Olof Foyer (born 3 November 1954) is the former ambassador of the Kingdom of Sweden accredited to and resident in the People's Democratic Republic of Korea (North Korea), a position he held from 2005 to 2010.

== Education ==
Foyer has an LL.B. and BA from the Stockholm University and speaks Swedish, English, Russian and French.

== Diplomatic career ==
From 2002 to 2005 Foyer was minister in charge of political affairs at the Swedish Embassy in Beijing. Foyer has also served in the posts of the Russian Federation, and Czech Republic.:

At home in Sweden he worked at the Russian desk at the Ministry of Foreign Affairs.

Foyer was involved in the talks to release American journalists held in North Korea. He met with the journalists several times while they were held. The government of Sweden represents the United States in North Korea in lieu of an American embassy.

== Awards and decorations ==
- (Kazakhstan) Order of Friendship, 2nd Class (29 November 2022)

Diplomatic posts
Preceded by Paul Beijer	Ambassador of Sweden to North Korea; 2005–2010	Succeeded by Barbro Elm
Preceded by Christian Kamill	Ambassador of Sweden to Kazakhstan; 2017–2022	Succeeded by Ewa Polano
