= Barbro Elm =

Swedish diplomat

Her Excellency Barbro Elm
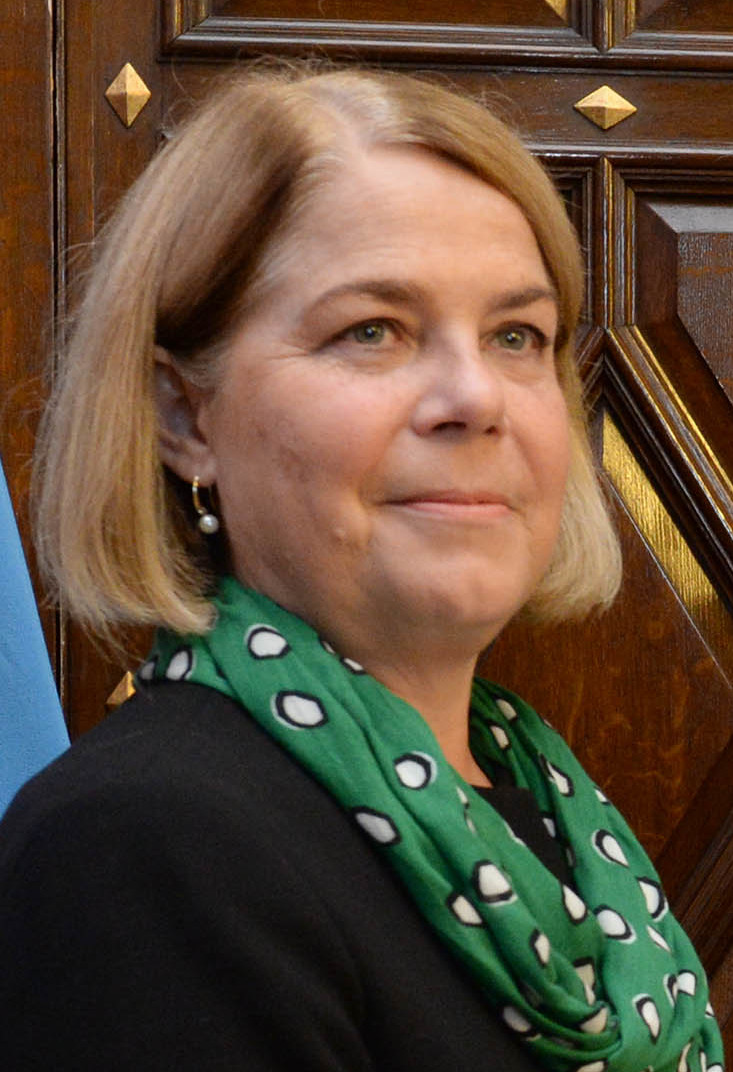
- Elm in 2015

Ambassador of Sweden to Argentina
- In office 1 September 2016 – July 2019
- Preceded by: Gufran Al-Nadaf
- Succeeded by: Anders Carlsson

Ambassador of Sweden to North Korea
- In office 2010–2012
- Preceded by: Mats Foyer
- Succeeded by: Karl-Olof Andersson

Personal details
- Born: 1959 (age 66–67) Sweden
- Occupation: Diplomat

Barbro Elm (born 1959) is a Swedish diplomat who formerly became the ambassador to Argentina from 2016 to 2019, and North Korea from 2010 to 2012. She has been assigned to Swedish embassies in several countries which include Dhaka, Havana, Athens, Madrid and Bratislava.

== Diplomatic career ==
=== Argentina ===
Elm has been chosen as the Swedish government's envoy in Buenos Aires. She works at the Foreign Ministry's America division at the moment. Her new role would begin on 1 September 2016.

Barbro Elm, the Swedish ambassador to Argentina, honoured the memory of Raoul Wallenberg, the Swedish diplomat who prevented thousands of deaths in Nazi-occupied Hungary, on 17 January 2017. The act was timed to the release of a lengthy piece in The Jerusalem Post titled "Our debt to Raoul Wallenberg," which had signatures from Baruch Tenembaum, Eduardo Eurnekian, and Perla Graisman, the founder, president, and director of worldwide development of the Raoul Wallenberg Foundation.

Rodolfo Nin Novoa and Elm received credentials from Rodolfo Nin Novoa on 21 March 2017. The occasion was used to evaluate the most important features of the great relations between the two countries. Among other things, the Uruguay-Sweden Political Consultation Mechanism Meeting in April 2016 was noteworthy because it established a structure for both nations to prioritise measures on subjects of shared interest.

In May 2017, the Elm paid a visit to South American Institute for Resilience and Sustainability Studies along with a delegation led by Sweden's Ministry of Public Administration's Ardalan Shekarabi. During the event, many measures were deliberated upon in an effort to progress systems for academic cooperation between the nations. Among these measures was the advancement of PhD scholarships in Sweden. The event was planned as a component of Stockholm University's outreach tour, which aims to strengthen ties with various Latin American universities. Elm provided a reception to kick off the gathering.

On 6 June, the national day of Sweden, Ambassador Elm, gave a reception last Wednesday in honour of the country. Elm would conclude a three-year tenure to Argentina, Uruguay, and Paraguay in July 2019.

=== Return to Sweden ===
The news of the "impending execution of the sentence" were known to them, according to Elm, a spokesman for the Swedish foreign ministry who spoke to AFP. "We are trying to clarify the reports and are continually raising the issue with representatives for Iranian authorities," she stated. A reference to Ahmad Reza Djalali, who was given a death sentence after being charged with spying on and working with Israel.

Diplomatic posts
Preceded by Mats Foyer	Ambassador of Sweden to North Korea; 2010–2012	Succeeded by Karl-Olof Andersson
Preceded by Gufran Al-Nadaf	Ambassador of Sweden to Argentina; 2016–2019	Succeeded by Anders Carlsson
Preceded by Gufran Al-Nadaf	Ambassador of Sweden to Paraguay; 2016–2019	Succeeded by Anders Carlsson
Preceded by Gufran Al-Nadaf	Ambassador of Sweden to Uruguay; 2016–2019	Succeeded by Anders Carlsson
