= List of ambassadors of Sweden to Uruguay =

Ambassador of Sweden to Uruguay
- Lesser coat of arms of the Kingdom of Sweden
- Incumbent; Torsten Ericsson since 2023
- Ministry for Foreign Affairs; Swedish Embassy, Montevideo
- Style: His or Her Excellency (formal); Mr. or Madam Ambassador (informal)
- Reports to: Minister for Foreign Affairs
- Seat: Buenos Aires, Argentina (Note: The Swedish ambassador in Buenos Aires is also accredited in Montevideo.)
- Appointer: Government of Sweden
- Term length: No fixed term
- Inaugural holder: Carl Hultgren
- Formation: 1918

The Ambassador of Sweden to Uruguay (known formally as the Ambassador of the Kingdom of Sweden to the Oriental Republic of Uruguay) is the official representative of the government of Sweden to the president of Uruguay and government of Uruguay. Since Sweden does not have an embassy in Montevideo, Sweden's ambassador in Buenos Aires, Argentina is co-accredited in Montevideo.

== History ==
In July 1949, the King in Council appointed councillor Carl-Herbert Borgenstierna at the Swedish legation in Buenos Aires to serve as chargé d'affaires en pied in Montevideo. Borgenstierna moved to Montevideo in early November of the same year to open a Swedish legation.

In June 1961, an agreement was reached between the Swedish and Uruguayan governments on the mutual elevation of the respective countries' legations to embassies. The diplomatic rank was thereafter changed to ambassador instead of envoy extraordinary and minister plenipotentiary. In connection with this, Sweden's envoy to Montevideo, Gösta Hedengren, was designated as ambassador.

Due to budget cuts, the Swedish embassy in Montevideo was downgraded in 1981 to an embassy office headed by a non-resident ambassador. In 1991, the Swedish government announced plans to close the embassy within the coming years, and on 11 January 1993, the decision to shut it down was officially made.

== List of representatives ==
| Name | Period | Resident/Non resident | Title | Notes | Presented credentials | Ref |
|---|---|---|---|---|---|---|
| Carl Hultgren | 1918–1925 | Non-resident | Envoy | Resident in Buenos Aires | | |
| Einar Ekstrand | 1925–1931 | Non-resident | Envoy | Resident in Buenos Aires | | |
| Christian Günther | 23 January 1931 – 1933 | Non-resident | Envoy | Resident in Buenos Aires | | |
| Einar Modig | 31 December 1934 – 1939 | Non-resident | Envoy | Resident in Buenos Aires | | |
| Wilhelm Winther | 1940–1945 | Non-resident | Envoy | Resident in Buenos Aires | | |
| Carl Olof Gisle | 1945–1948 | Non-resident | Envoy | Resident in Buenos Aires | | |
| Herbert Ribbing | December 1948 – 1949 | Non-resident | Envoy | Resident in Buenos Aires | | |
| Carl-Herbert Borgenstierna | July 1949 – 1953 | Resident | Charge d'affaires en pied | | | |
| Gösta Hedengren | 1953–1956 | Resident | Charge d'affaires | | | |
| Gösta Hedengren | 1956 – June 1961 | Resident | Envoy | | | |
| Gösta Hedengren | June 1961 – 1963 | Resident | Ambassador | | | |
| Åke Jonsson | 1964–1969 | Resident | Ambassador | | | |
| Tore Högstedt | 1969–1976 | Resident | Ambassador | Also accredited to Asunción (from 1972) | | |
| Torsten Björck | 1976–1981 | Resident | Ambassador | Also accredited to Asunción | | |
| Lars Karlström | 1981–1983 | Non-resident | Ambassador | Resident in Buenos Aires | | |
| Bengt Friedman | 1983–1986 | Non-resident | Ambassador | Resident in Buenos Aires | | |
| Claes Sandgren | 1985–1987 | Resident | Chargé d'affaires ad interim (Note: Held the diplomatic rank of first embassy secretary.) | | | |
| Ethel Wiklund | 1986–1987 | Non-resident | Ambassador | Resident in Buenos Aires | | |
| Christer Persson | 1987–1990 | Resident | Chargé d'affaires ad interim (Note: Held the following diplomatic ranks: first embassy secretary (1987–1990) and embassy counselor (1990).) | | | |
| Anders Sandström | 1987–1993 | Non-resident | Ambassador | Resident in Buenos Aires | | |
| Göran Bolin | 1990–1993 | Resident | Chargé d'affaires ad interim (Note: Held the diplomatic rank of embassy counselor.) | | | |
| Håkan Granqvist | 1994–1997 | Non-resident | Ambassador | Resident in Buenos Aires | | |
| Peter Landelius | 1997–2001 | Non-resident | Ambassador | Resident in Buenos Aires | | |
| Martin Wilkens | 2002–2005 | Non-resident | Ambassador | Resident in Buenos Aires (Note: The Swedish ambassador in Buenos Aires Madeleine Ströje-Wilkens' husband, Martin Wilkens was stationed as ambassador at the Swedish Embassy in Buenos Aires from 2002 to 2005, with dual accreditation to Montevideo (and Asunción and La Paz).) | | |
| Arne Rodin | 2005–2010 | Non-resident | Ambassador | Resident in Buenos Aires | | |
| Charlotte Wrangberg | 2010–2013 | Non-resident | Ambassador | Resident in Buenos Aires | 22 February 2011 | |
| Gufran Al-Nadaf | 2013–2016 | Non-resident | Ambassador | Resident in Buenos Aires | 10 March 2014 | |
| Barbro Elm | 2016–2019 | Non-resident | Ambassador | Resident in Buenos Aires | 19 December 2017 | |
| Anders Carlsson | 2019–2023 | Non-resident | Ambassador | Resident in Buenos Aires | 4 May 2023 | |
| Torsten Ericsson | 2023–present | Non-resident | Ambassador | Resident in Buenos Aires | 7 January 2025 | |

== See also ==
- Sweden–Uruguay relations
