= List of ambassadors of Sweden to Estonia =

Ambassador of Sweden to Estonia
- Lesser coat of arms of the Kingdom of Sweden

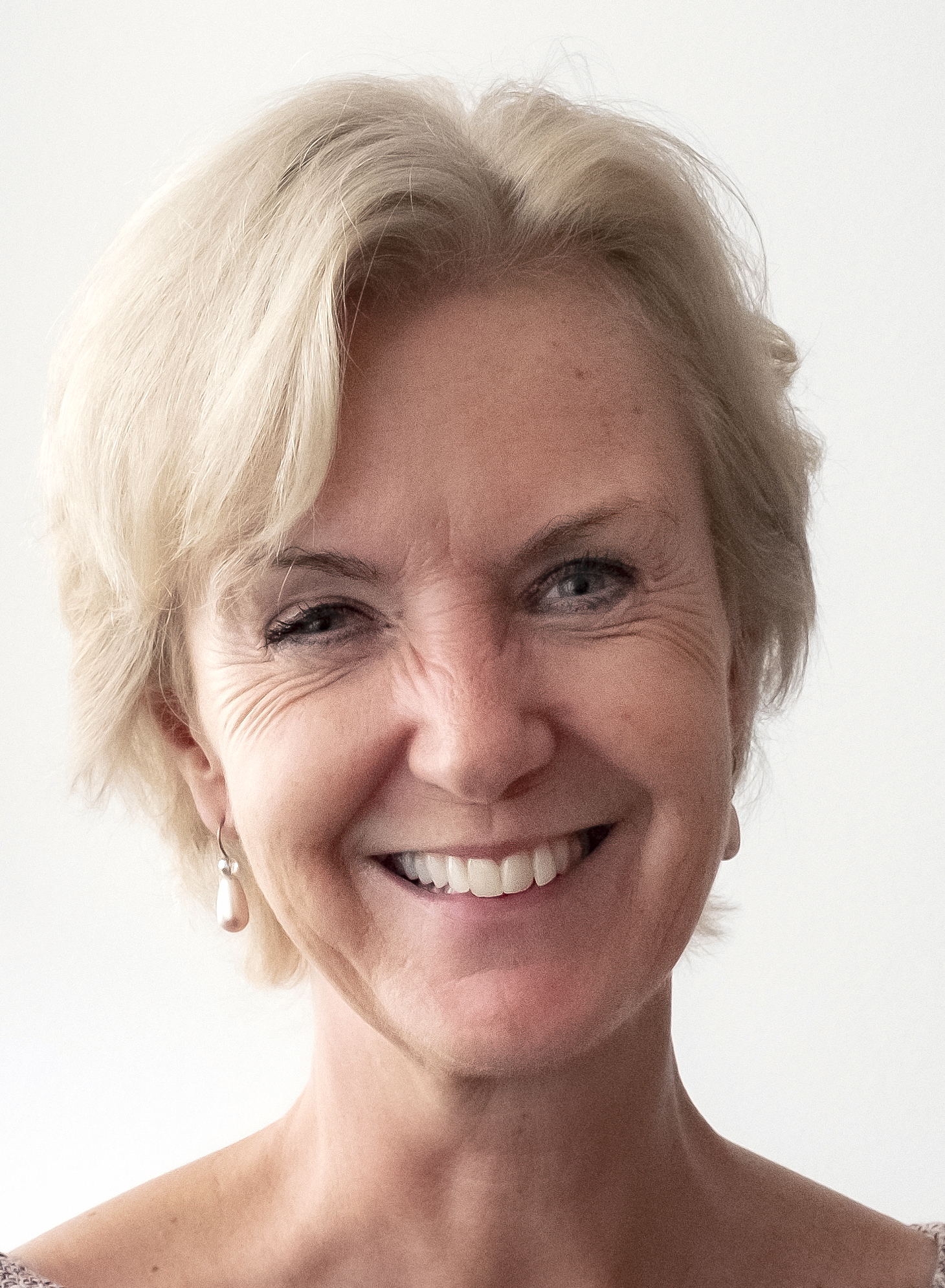
- Incumbent; Charlotte Wrangberg since 2024
- Ministry for Foreign Affairs; Swedish Embassy, Tallinn
- Style: His or Her Excellency (formal); Mr. or Madam Ambassador (informal)
- Reports to: Minister for Foreign Affairs
- Residence: Pikk tn 28, Old Town (Note: The ambassador's residence is at the same location as the chancery.)
- Seat: Tallinn, Estonia
- Appointer: Government of Sweden
- Term length: No fixed term
- Inaugural holder: Torsten Undén
- Formation: 1921
- Website: Swedish Embassy, Tallinn

The Ambassador of Sweden to Estonia (known formally as the Ambassador of the Kingdom of Sweden to the Republic of Estonia) is the official representative of the government of Sweden to the president of Estonia and government of Estonia.

== History ==
A Swedish consulate was established in Reval (Tallinn) in 1814 and converted into a vice-consulate in 1850. In 1919, Sweden reopened a consulate in Reval. On 4 February 1921, it was announced that the King in Council had recognized the Republic of Estonia as an independent and sovereign state. Later that summer, a chargé d'affaires ad interim was appointed to head the consulate, which functioned as a legation during the interwar period. On 30 September 1921, Torsten Undén was appointed Sweden's first minister in Reval and Riga. After just one year, the legation was relocated to Riga, and the mission in Tallinn was downgraded to a consulate under the Riga embassy. The head of mission in Riga thus became accredited in Tallinn as well.

The consulate was closed in 1938. In September 1939, Sweden's envoy to Riga, Tallinn, and Kaunas, Birger Johansson, presented his letters of recall to the Estonian and Lithuanian presidents. At the same time, Legation Counselor Svante Hellstedt took office as chargé d'affaires en pied in Tallinn. On 15 June 1940, the Soviet Union began its occupation of the Baltic states. On 24 August 1940, Sweden closed its diplomatic missions in Tallinn, Riga, and Kaunas, with a deadline of 25 August to complete the withdrawal.

In 1989, Sweden opened a branch office in Tallinn under the Consulate General in Leningrad, managed by a consul. On 27 August 1991, the Swedish government decided to reestablish diplomatic relations with Estonia. The agreement took effect the following day, 28 August. The Swedish consul was then appointed ambassador, and an embassy was opened in the former consulate's premises.

The new Swedish embassy in Tallinn was inaugurated on 29 August 1991, in a ceremony officiated by Minister for Foreign Affairs Sten Andersson.

== List of representatives ==
Name	Period	Title	Resident / Concurrent accreditation	Notes	Presented credentials	Ref
Einar af Wirsén	24 June 1921 – December 1921	Chargé d'affaires ad interim	Also in Riga			
Torsten Undén	1921–1928	Envoy	Resident in Riga			
Patrik Reuterswärd	13 June 1928 – 1935	Envoy	Resident in Riga			
Herbert Ribbing	30 April – 2 June 1929	Chargé d'affaires ad interim (Note: With diplomatic rank of first legation secretary.)	Also in Riga and Kovno			
Herbert Ribbing	15 November – 1 December 1929	Chargé d'affaires ad interim	Also in Riga and Kovno			
Anders Koskull	1 July 1930 – 29 June 1938	Chargé d'affaires ad interim (Note: With diplomatic rank of minister plenipotentiary.)		Died in office (Note: Anders Koskull died during his vacation in Sweden on 29 June 1938. Erik von Sydow was already in Tallinn to fill in for Koskull when Koskull died in Stockholm.)		
Birger Johansson	1935 – September 1939	Envoy	Resident in Riga		29 August 1935	
Svante Hellstedt	1 September 1938 – September 1939	Chargé d'affaires ad interim (Note: With diplomatic rank of legation counsellor.)				
Svante Hellstedt	September 1939 – 24 August 1940	Chargé d'affaires en pied				
No head of mission between 1940 and 1991
Lars Grundberg	1991–1995	Ambassador				
Katarina Brodin	1995–1998	Ambassador				
Elisabet Borsiin Bonnier	1998–2003	Ambassador				
Dag Hartelius	2003–2008	Ambassador				
Jan Palmstierna	2008–2013	Ambassador				
Anders Ljunggren	September 2013 – 2018	Ambassador				
Mikael Eriksson	1 September 2018 – 2021	Ambassador				
Ingrid Tersman	October 2021 – 2024	Ambassador				
Charlotte Wrangberg	2024–present	Ambassador				

== See also ==
- Estonia–Sweden relations
