= Gufran Al-Nadaf =

Swedish journalist and diplomat

Her Excellency Gufran Al-Nadaf
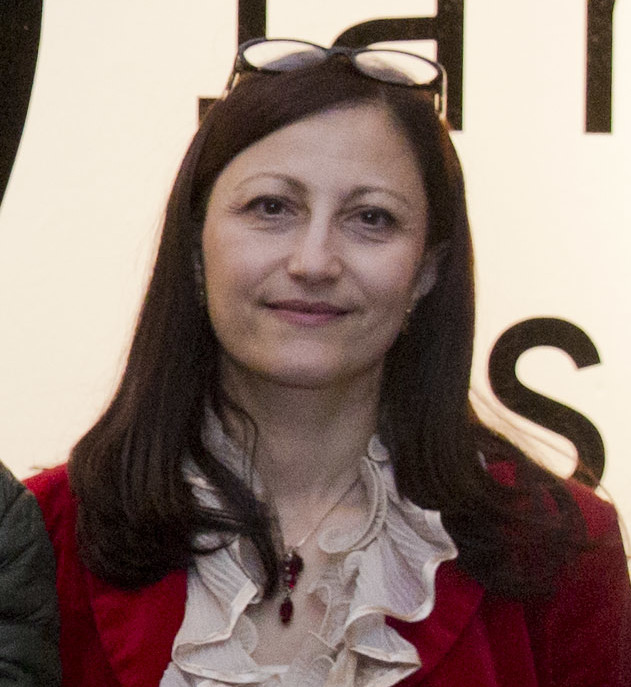
- Al-Nadaf in 2015

Ambassador of Sweden to Argentina
- In office 11 April 2013 – 2016
- Preceded by: Charlotte Wrangberg
- Succeeded by: Barbro Elm

Personal details
- Born: 17 December 1967 (age 58) Bucharest, Romania
- Education: Uppsala University; Stockholm University
- Occupation: Journalist and diplomat

Gufran Al-Nadaf (born 17 December 1967) is a Swedish journalist and diplomat of Iraqi–Iranian descent who formerly became the ambassador to Argentina from 2013 to 2016. She began her career at the Ministry for Foreign Affairs, and during Sweden's tenure on the UN Security Council (2017–2018), she held the positions of ambassador for children and armed conflict.

== Early life and education ==
Al-Nadaf was born in Bucharest and raised in Iraq, but she also spent her early years in Romania, Iran, and Libya. Her parents are Iraqi and Iranian, respectively. The family arrived in Sweden in 1978, and in 1979 they were granted refuge. Since then, the country has become the family's new home. She attended the universities of Uppsala and Stockholm.

== Career ==
=== Journalism ===
Al-Nadaf was employed for Sveriges Television as a journalist. For the first time since she was two years old, Al-Nadaf returned to Iraq in 2009, this time donning a bulletproof vest and helmet.

=== Diplomatic career ===
==== Argentina ====
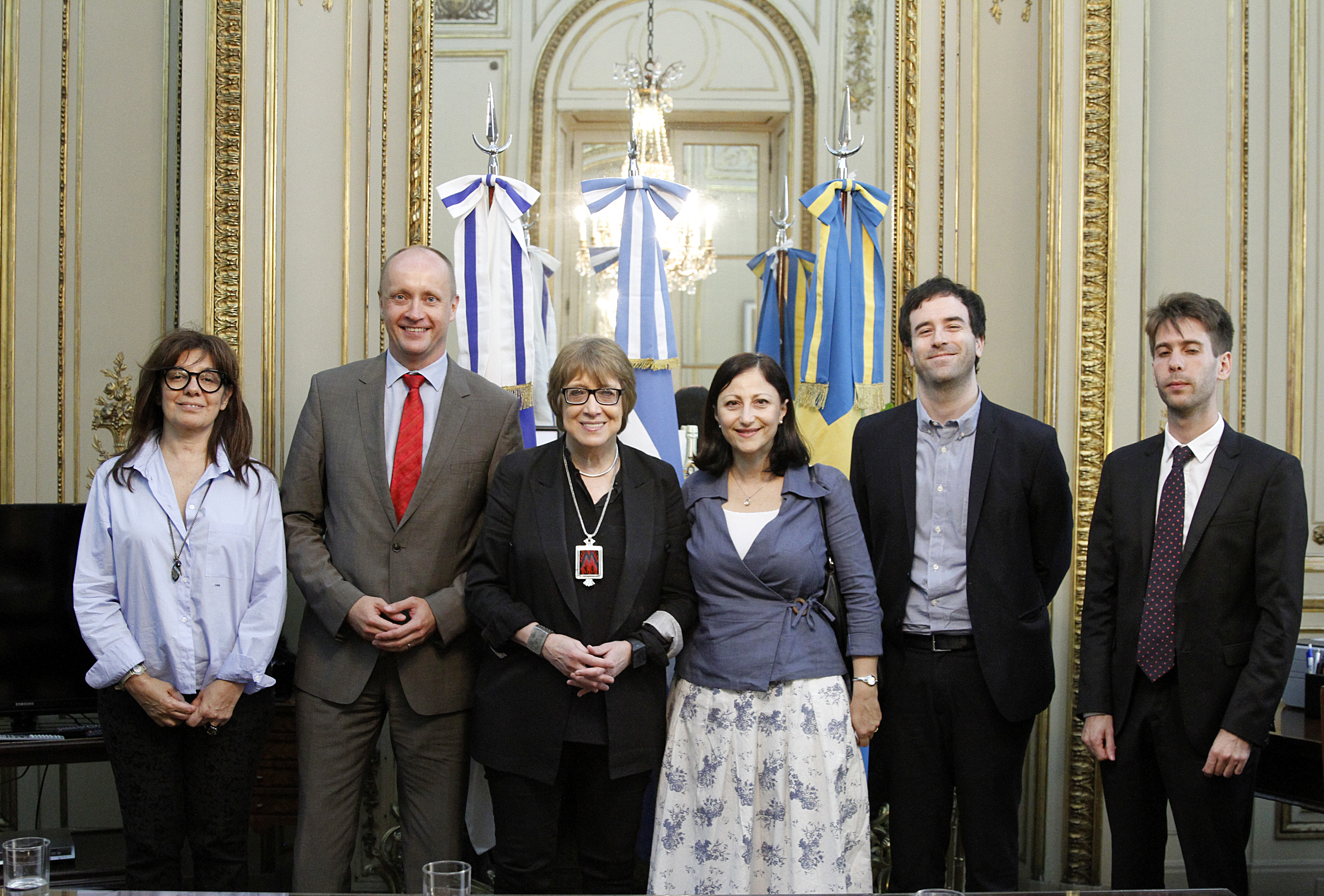
Al-Nadaf (3rd, right) next to Teresa Parodi in Argentina, 2014

Al-Nadaf, the ambassador to Argentina, was one of several new ambassadors nominated by the Swedish government on 11 April 2013. At the time of her appointment, she worked in the Middle East and North Africa division of the Ministry of Foreign Affairs. She had previously worked in the Foreign Ministry's Press, Information, and Communications Unit, the then-embassy in Lima, the embassy in Damascus, where she was in charge of monitoring Lebanon, and other places. She said goodbye in Colonia del Sacramento, Uruguay. After serving as ambassador for three years in Uruguay, Argentina, and Paraguay, she returned to Sweden in the fall of 2016. Among other things, she has been concerned in refugee concerns.

==== UN Security Council ====
She later served as Swedish Ambassador for Children and Armed Conflict, since March 2017. She was based at the Ministry of Foreign Affairs in Stockholm. Within the framework of Swedish foreign and development policy, she would be in charge of organising the activities related to children and armed conflict. She was appointed in an effort to bolster the country's already strong focus on the problem of children in armed conflict.

Al-Nadaf's trip to the Democratic Republic of the Congo (DRC) with UNICEF came to a close on 24 May 2018. The Ambassador has visited with both children who were directly involved in fighting and children whose communities are harmed to have a deeper understanding of the effects of the armed conflict on children in Congo and to boost her advocacy work.

=== Later life ===
According to Al-Nadaf, the rector of the Foreign Ministry's Diplomat Program, a selection process that was too restrictive can undermine democracy because Swedish diplomats are expected to be able to represent the entirety of Sweden. Since September 2019, she has served as the special diplomatic program's rector.

Diplomatic posts
Preceded by Charlotte Wrangberg	Ambassador of Sweden to Argentina; 2013–2016	Succeeded by Barbro Elm
Preceded by Charlotte Wrangberg	Ambassador of Sweden to Paraguay; 2013–2016	Succeeded by Barbro Elm
Preceded by Charlotte Wrangberg	Ambassador of Sweden to Uruguay; 2013–2016	Succeeded by Barbro Elm
