= Gerhard Löwen =

Swedish diplomat (1868–1938)

Baron Gerhard Löwen
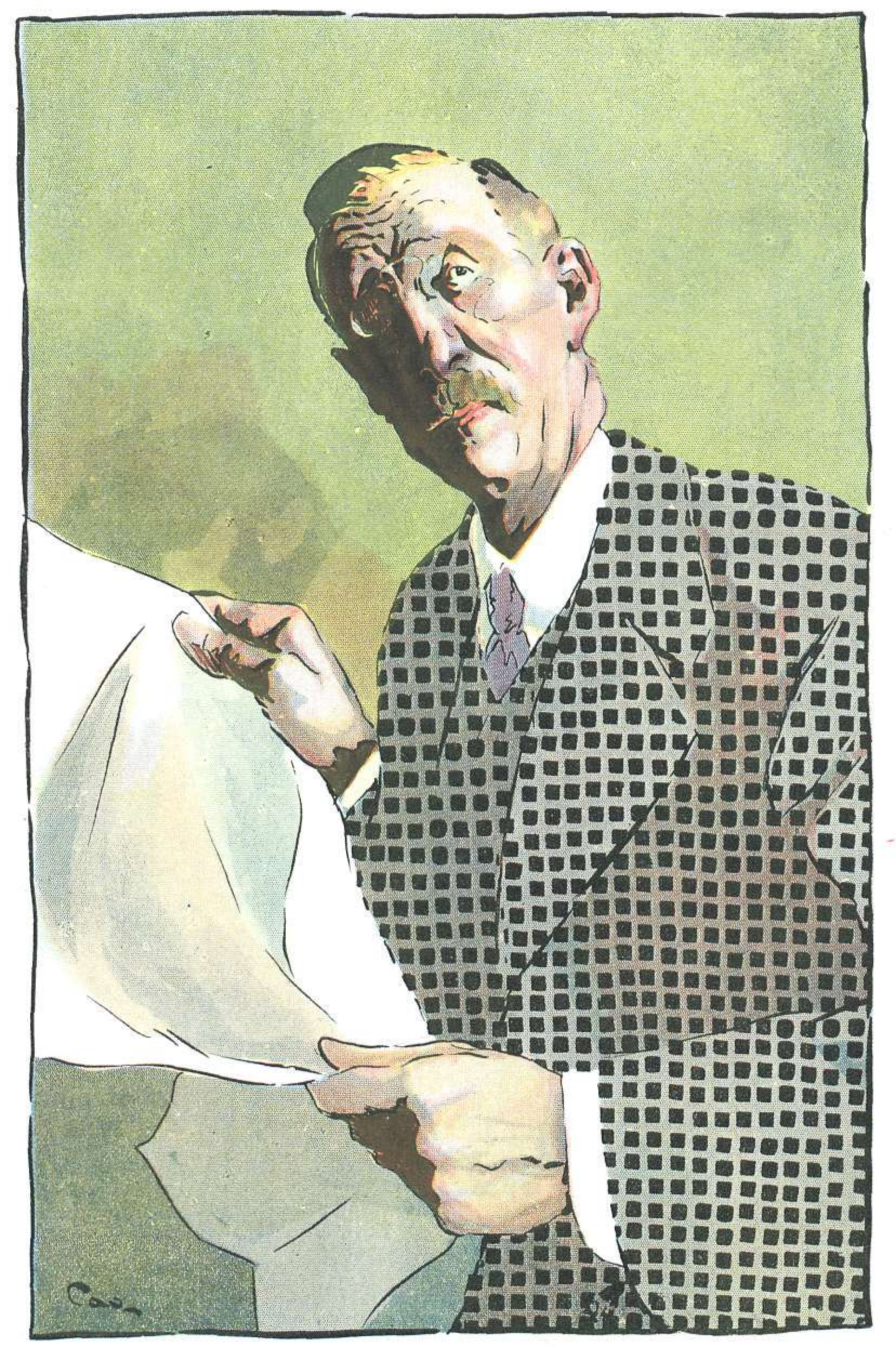
- Caricature of Löwen by José María Cao.
- Born: Carl Gerhard Eugen Löwen; 9 August 1868; Västerhaninge, Sweden
- Died: 27 January 1938 (aged 69); Lästringe, Sweden
- Education: Uppsala University
- Occupation: Diplomat
- Years active: 1894–1935

Baron Carl Gerhard Eugen Löwen (9 August 1868 – 27 January 1938) was a Swedish diplomat. He entered government service in 1894 and joined the diplomatic service in 1898. He served in Stockholm and Saint Petersburg before becoming resident minister and consul general in Buenos Aires in 1910. Following his recall in connection with the Luxburg affair in 1917, he was placed at the disposal of the government. In 1920, he undertook a special mission to Iceland, and in 1921 became Sweden's first envoy extraordinary and minister plenipotentiary to Czechoslovakia, serving in Prague until 1932.

== Early life ==
Gerhard Löwen was born into the noble Löwen family on 9 August 1868 at Häringe Palace in Västerhaninge, Stockholm County, Sweden. He was the son of the officer and estate manager Baron Claes Vilhelm Fabian Löwen (1838–1904) and his first wife, Görel Maria Eleonora Wiman (1835–1887). After his mother's death, his father remarried in 1892 to Ingeborg Agda Tillander (born 1852). He had two brothers, one older and one younger, as well as a sister. Through his sister Görel, he was the brother-in-law of the officer and athlete Carl Adlercreutz (1864–1930).

Löwen passed his matriculation examination (mogenhetsexamen) in Stockholm on 17 May 1886 and enrolled at Uppsala University on 24 September of the same year. He passed the preliminary law examination (juridisk preliminärexamen) on 13 December 1887 and completed his legal examination for service in the judiciary (hovrättsexamen) on 31 May 1894.

== Career ==
On 5 June 1894, Löwen was appointed an extra-ordinary clerk at the Svea Court of Appeal; on 2 February 1897, an extra-ordinary official at the National Board of Trade; on 30 December 1898, a consular fellow; and on 5 December 1901, second secretary at the Ministry for Foreign Affairs. On 13 March 1904, he was appointed acting legation secretary in Saint Petersburg, and on 23 September 1906, legation counsellor there. On 16 December 1910, he was appointed resident minister and consul general in Buenos Aires.

In Buenos Aires, Löwen became involved in the so-called Luxburg affair in 1917. In the midst of the First World War, United States secretary of state Robert Lansing announced that the Swedish legation in Buenos Aires had, through the Ministry for Foreign Affairs in Stockholm, forwarded coded telegrams to Berlin from the German minister to Argentina, Count Karl von Luxburg. The revelation provoked a strong reaction, particularly in the Entente countries, and the Swedish government was accused of violating Sweden's neutrality. Löwen was recalled to Sweden, although many believed that he had acted on instructions from the Ministry for Foreign Affairs.

On 15 March 1918, Löwen was placed at the disposal of the government as resident minister. In 1920, Löwen was assigned a special mission to Iceland. The King in Council appointed him to travel to Iceland during the summer of that year to investigate the matter of Swedish representation there and to take preparatory measures for establishing a practical solution.

Following the government's decision to establish a Swedish legation in Czechoslovakia, Löwen was appointed in January 1921 as Sweden's first envoy extraordinary and minister plenipotentiary to the Czechoslovak Republic. He presented his credentials to President Tomáš Masaryk on 5 May 1921.

On 17 April 1925, Löwen was appointed an honorary member of the Swedish-Czechoslovak Society (Svensk-tjeckoslovakiska sällskapet).

In September 1932, the king in council granted Löwen leave from his post as envoy in Prague and appointed him an envoy at the disposal of the government. He remained in this status from 1932 to 1935.

== Death ==
Löwen died on 27 January 1938 at his home at Gärdesta Manor in Lästringe socken, Nyköping Municipality. The funeral service took place on 3 February 1938, at Ösmo Church in Ösmo. He was interred on the same day at Ösmo Old Cemetery.

== Awards and decorations ==
=== Swedish ===
- (Sweden) King Gustaf V's Jubilee Commemorative Medal (1928)
- (Sweden) Commander Grand Cross of the Order of the Polar Star (6 June 1931)
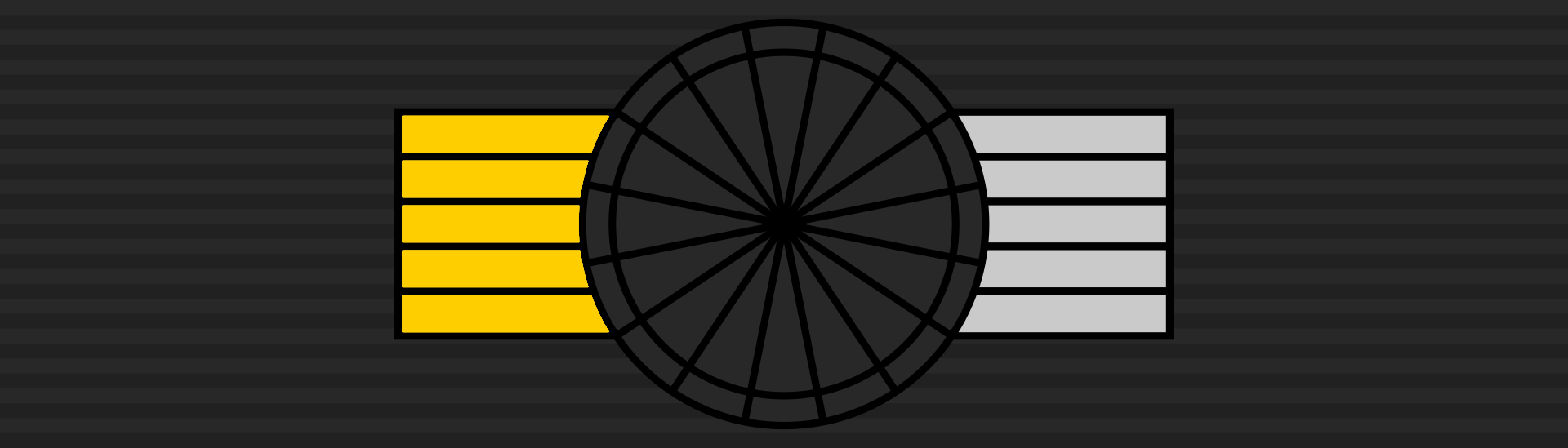
- (Sweden) Commander 1st Class of the Order of the Polar Star (6 June 1923)
- (Sweden) Commander of the Order of the Polar Star (6 August 1912)
- (Sweden) Knight of the Order of the Polar Star (18 June 1908)

=== Foreign ===
- (Czechoslovakia) Grand Cross of the Order of the White Lion (1929)
- (Portugal) Commander of the Order of the Immaculate Conception of Vila Viçosa (1907)
- (Spain) Knight of the Order of Charles III (1904)
- (Russian Empire) Knight 2nd Class Order of Saint Stanislaus with star (1909)

Diplomatic posts
Preceded by Olof Gyldén	Resident Minister and Consul General of Sweden to Buenos Aires; 1910–1918	Succeeded by Carl Hultgren
Preceded by None	Envoy of Sweden to Czechoslovakia; 1921–1932	Succeeded by Knut Richard Thyberg as Chargé d'affaires ad interim
