= Finlands sak är vår =

Swedish book by Lagercrantz and Hillebrand in 1939

Finlands sak är vår (English: The Finnish cause is ours) is the title of a Swedish book written by journalists Olof Lagercrantz and Karl-Gustaf Hildebrand. It appeared in December 1939, at the outbreak of the Winter War. Its print run was 600,000 copies, and it spread throughout Sweden.

The book's title was adopted as a campaign motto by the Finland committee. The sentence was coined by Swedish foreign minister Christian Günther. The campaign sought volunteers to fight with Finland against the Soviet invasion, and resulted in 10,000 applicants, of which 8,000 eventually were sent to Finland. In addition the campaign provided economic aid, clothing assistance and medical personnel. Many Swedish cultural personalities and journalists participated in the campaign. The campaign was financed by large Swedish companies as well as the Swedish Trade Union Confederation.
