= List of ambassadors of Sweden to Argentina =

Ambassador of Sweden to Argentina
- Lesser coat of arms of the Kingdom of Sweden
- Incumbent; Torsten Ericsson since August 2023
- Ministry for Foreign Affairs; Swedish Embassy, Buenos Aires
- Style: His or Her Excellency (formal); Mr. or Madam Ambassador (informal)
- Reports to: Minister for Foreign Affairs
- Seat: Buenos Aires, Argentina
- Appointer: Government of Sweden
- Term length: No fixed term
- Inaugural holder: Olof Gyldén
- Formation: 26 October 1906
- Website: Swedish Embassy, Buenos Aires

The Ambassador of Sweden to Argentina (known formally as the Ambassador of the Kingdom of Sweden to the Argentine Republic) is the official representative of the government of Sweden to the president of Argentina and government of Argentina.

== History ==
On 10 December 1831, a Swedish consulate was established in Buenos Aires, whose first holder was referred to as the consul general. On 1 October 1906, the position of consul general was combined with that of the head of the Swedish legation to the Argentine Republic, with a jurisdiction limited to that state.

The Swedish foreign minister, in a 14 January 1918 report to the King in Council regarding the 1919 national budget, reviewed Sweden's trade and maritime relations with South America. Concerning Chile, he noted that Sweden was represented only by an honorary consul in Valparaíso, who was also head of a large British firm. It was considered desirable to have a paid Swedish representative in Chile. This could be achieved without creating a separate consular or chargé d'affaires post by accrediting Sweden's diplomatic representative in Buenos Aires also to the Chilean Republic. Thanks to the new railway over the Andes, the distance between Buenos Aires and Santiago was small enough for the head of mission to visit Chile regularly. During his absence, a commercial attaché serving both countries could handle ongoing duties, and a consular officer could be added later if needed. From the same year 1918, Envoy Carl Hultgren was also accredited in Santiago (Chile) and Montevideo (Uruguay).

In January 1957, an agreement was reached between the Swedish and Argentine governments on the mutual elevation of the respective countries' legations to embassies. The diplomatic rank was thereafter changed to ambassador instead of envoy extraordinary and minister plenipotentiary.

Today the Swedish ambassador in Argentina is also accredited to Paraguay and Uruguay.

== List of representatives ==
#	Name	Title	Appointment	Presented credentials	Termination of mission	Notes	Ref
1	Olof Gyldén	Resident minister	26 October 1906	8 February 1907	21 January 1910	Also consul general.	
2	Gerhard Löwen	Resident minister	16 December 1910		15 March 1918	Also consul general.	
3	Carl Hultgren	Envoy Extraordinary and Minister Plenipotentiary	1 April 1918		1925	Also accredited to Asunción (from 1921), Montevideo, and Santiago (from 1 April 1918).	
4	Einar Ekstrand	Envoy Extraordinary and Minister Plenipotentiary	1925		1931	Also accredited to Asunción, Montevideo, and Santiago.	
–	Axel Paulin	Chargé d'affaires	1925		1926		
–	Axel Paulin	Chargé d'affaires	1928		1931		
5	Christian Günther	Envoy Extraordinary and Minister Plenipotentiary	23 January 1931		1933	Also accredited to Asunción, Montevideo, and Santiago.	
–	Axel Paulin	Chargé d'affaires	1932		1933		
6	Einar Modig	Envoy Extraordinary and Minister Plenipotentiary	31 December 1934		1939	Also accredited to Asunción, Montevideo, and Santiago.	
–	Gunnar Dryselius	Chargé d'affaires	1937		1938		
–	Gunnar Dryselius	Chargé d'affaires	1939		1940		
7	Wilhelm Winther	Envoy Extraordinary and Minister Plenipotentiary	1940		1945	Also accredited to Asunción and Montevideo.	
8	Carl Olof Gisle	Envoy Extraordinary and Minister Plenipotentiary	1945		1949	Also accredited to Asunción and Montevideo.	
9	Herbert Ribbing	Envoy Extraordinary and Minister Plenipotentiary	1949	16 January 1957 (Note: As amabssador.)	January 1957	Also accredited to Asunción and Montevideo (until 1949).	
9	Herbert Ribbing	Ambassador Extraordinary and Plenipotentiary	January 1957		1958	Also accredited to Asunción.	
10	Carl-Herbert Borgenstierna	Ambassador Extraordinary and Plenipotentiary	1958	19 February 1958	1963	Also accredited to Asunción.	
11	Östen Lundborg	Ambassador Extraordinary and Plenipotentiary	1964		1972	Also accredited to Asunción.	
12	Sven Fredrik Hedin	Ambassador Extraordinary and Plenipotentiary	1973		1975		
13	Per Bertil Kollberg	Ambassador Extraordinary and Plenipotentiary	1975		1977		
14	Karl-Anders Wollter	Ambassador Extraordinary and Plenipotentiary	1977		1980		
15	Lars Karlström	Ambassador Extraordinary and Plenipotentiary	1980		1983	Also accredited to Montevideo (from 1981).	
16	Bengt Friedman	Ambassador Extraordinary and Plenipotentiary	1983		1986	Also accredited to Montevideo.	
17	Ethel Wiklund	Ambassador Extraordinary and Plenipotentiary	1986		1987	Also accredited to Asunción and Montevideo.	
18	Anders Sandström	Ambassador Extraordinary and Plenipotentiary	1987		1994	Also accredited to Asunción and Montevideo.	
19	Håkan Granqvist	Ambassador Extraordinary and Plenipotentiary	1994		1997	Also accredited to Asunción and Montevideo.	
20	Peter Landelius	Ambassador Extraordinary and Plenipotentiary	1997	5 March 1997	2001	Also accredited to Asunción and Montevideo.	
21	Madeleine Ströje-Wilkens	Ambassador Extraordinary and Plenipotentiary	2001	7 November 2001	2005	No dual accreditation. (Note: Ambassador Madeleine Ströje-Wilkens' husband, Martin Wilkens was stationed as ambassador at the Swedish Embassy in Buenos Aires from 2002 to 2005, with dual accreditation to Asunción, La Paz, and Montevideo.)	
22	Arne Rodin	Ambassador Extraordinary and Plenipotentiary	2005		2010	Also accredited to Asunción, La Paz, and Montevideo.	
23	Charlotte Wrangberg	Ambassador Extraordinary and Plenipotentiary	2010	1 November 2010	2013	Also accredited to Asunción and Montevideo.	
24	Gufran Al-Nadaf	Ambassador Extraordinary and Plenipotentiary	12 April 2013	5 September 2013	2016	Also accredited to Asunción and Montevideo.	
25	Barbro Elm	Ambassador Extraordinary and Plenipotentiary	23 March 2016	27 September 2016	2019	Also accredited to Asunción and Montevideo.	
26	Anders Carlsson	Ambassador Extraordinary and Plenipotentiary	11 April 2019	10 September 2019	2023	Also accredited to Asunción and Montevideo.	
27	Torsten Ericsson	Ambassador Extraordinary and Plenipotentiary	17 May 2023	6 October 2023	Incumbent	Also accredited to Asunción (Note: Presented credentials to President Santiago Peña on 4 March 2024.) and Montevideo (Note: Presented credentials to President Luis Lacalle Pou on 7 January 2025.).	

== Gallery ==
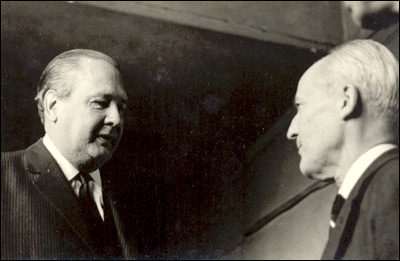
Ambassador Östen Lundborg (1964–1972) and Luis Federico Leloir.

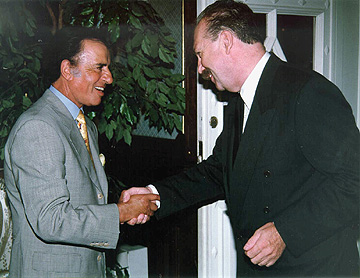
Ambassador Håkan Granqvist (1994–1997) and President Carlos Menem.

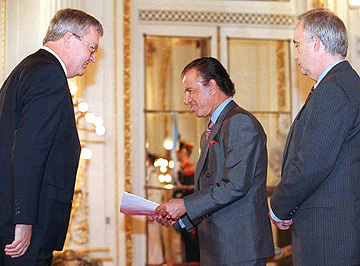
Ambassador Peter Landelius (1997–2001) and President Carlos Menem.

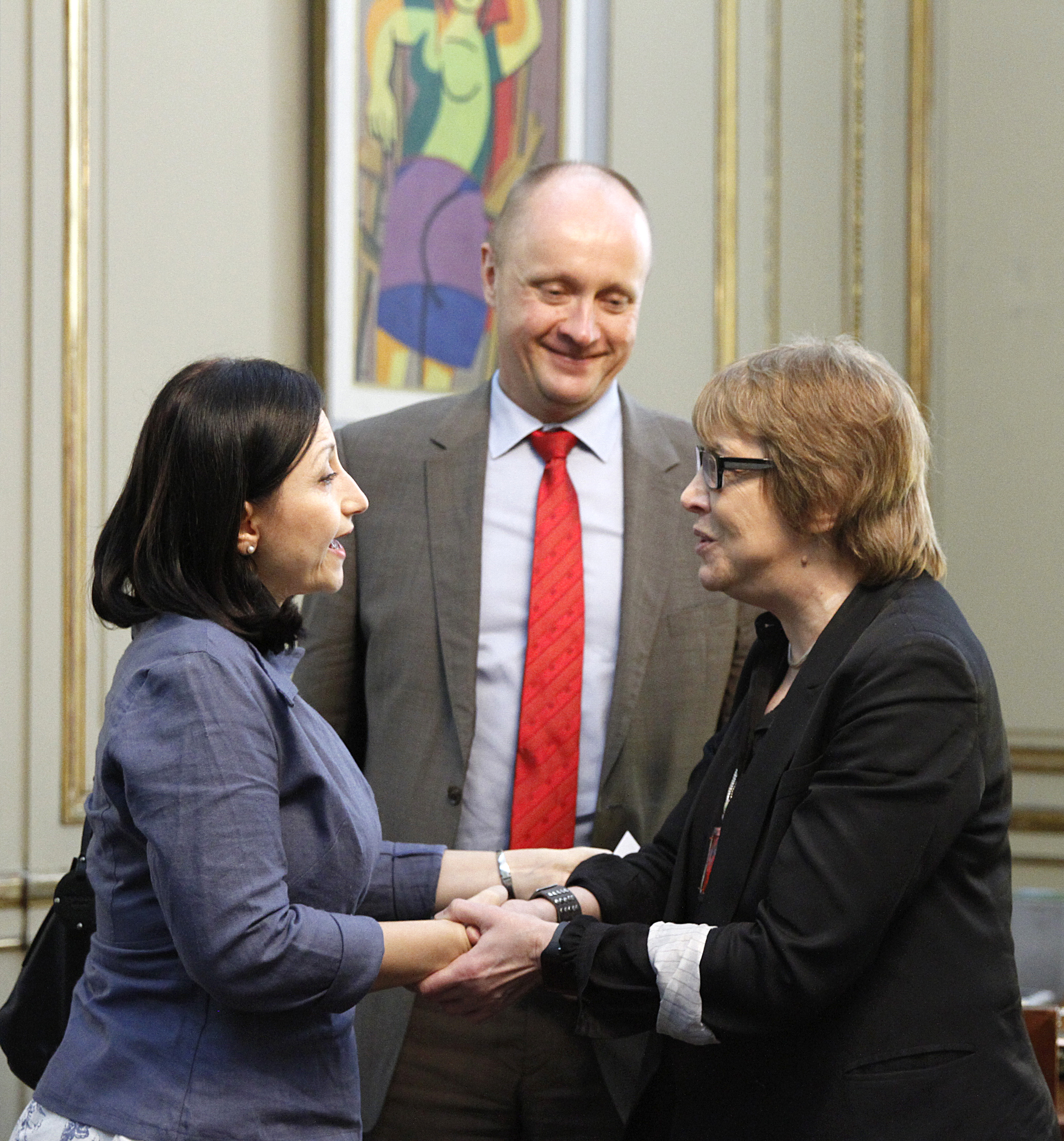
Ambassador Gufran Al-Nadaf (2013–2016) and Minister of Culture Teresa Parodi.

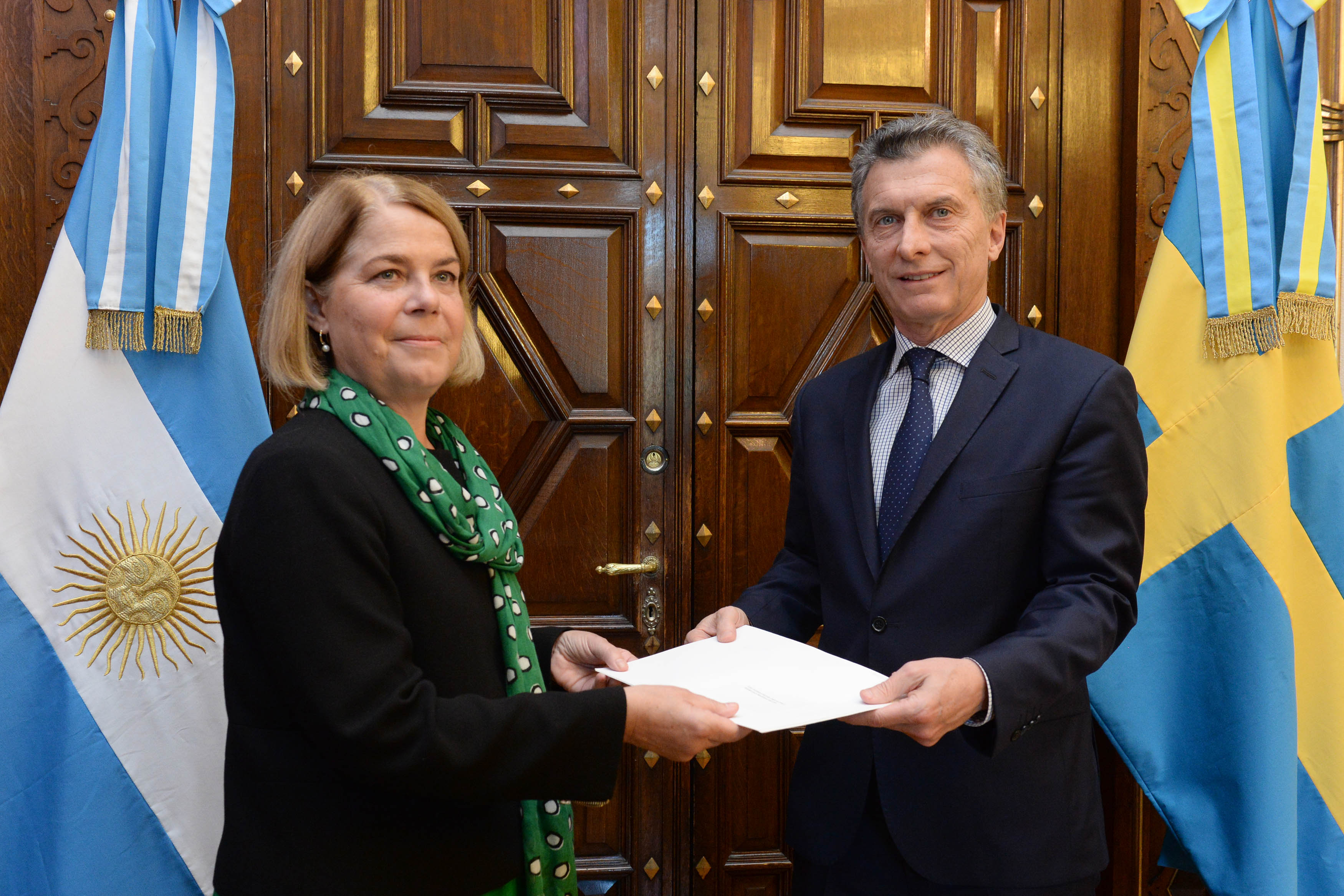
Ambassador Barbro Elm (2016–2019) and President Mauricio Macri.

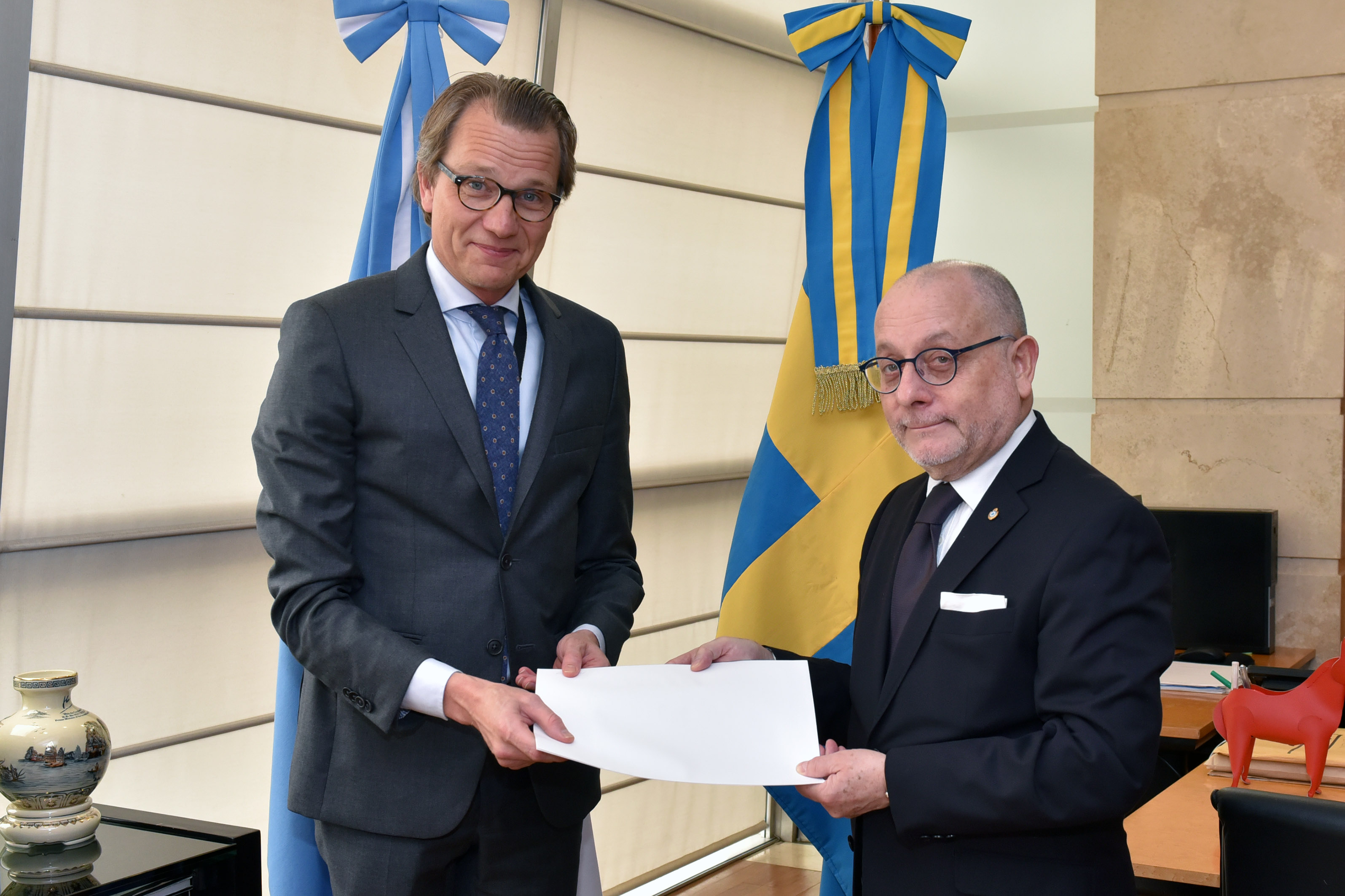
Ambassador Anders Carlsson (2019–2023) and Minister of Foreign Affairs Jorge Faurie.

== See also ==
- Argentina–Sweden relations
- Embassy of Sweden, Buenos Aires
