= List of ambassadors of Sweden to North Korea =

Ambassador of Sweden to North Korea
- Lesser coat of arms of the Kingdom of Sweden
- Incumbent; Josef Ahlberg since August 2026
- Ministry for Foreign Affairs; Swedish Embassy, Pyongyang
- Style: His or Her Excellency (formal); Mr. or Madam Ambassador (informal)
- Reports to: Minister for Foreign Affairs
- Residence: Munsudong 3, Taedonggang-guyok
- Seat: Pyongyang, North Korea
- Appointer: Government of Sweden
- Term length: No fixed term
- Inaugural holder: Arne Björnberg
- Formation: May 1973
- Website: Swedish Embassy, Pyongyang

The Ambassador of Sweden to North Korea (known formally as the Ambassador of the Kingdom of Sweden to the Democratic People's Republic of Korea) is the official representative of the government of Sweden to the Supreme Leader and government of North Korea. Sweden is the protecting power of United States interests in North Korea. Until 2001, Sweden was the only western state with unbroken diplomatic representation in the city. The Swedish embassy has consular representation for Australia, Canada and the Nordic countries.

== History ==
On 6 April 1973, the Swedish government decided, as the first Western European country, in the Council of State to recognize North Korea. Two days later, on 8 April, North Korea announced that it had received and accepted Sweden's proposal to establish diplomatic relations between the two countries. In May of the same year, Sweden's ambassador in Beijing, Arne Björnberg, was also accredited to North Korea. Björnberg presented his credentials to President Kim Il Sung in Pyongyang on 24 May 1973. Björnberg was the first diplomat to present his credentials to Kim Il Sung, who had become president the year before.

On 6 December 1974, Erik Cornell was appointed Sweden's first counsellor and chargé d'affaires ad interim in Pyongyang. The Swedish embassy opened in February 1975. Until 2002, the Swedish ambassador was still accredited from Beijing, when Paul Beijer was appointed as Sweden's first resident ambassador in Pyongyang.

== List of representatives ==
Name	Period	Resident/Non resident	Title	Notes	Ref
Arne Björnberg	May 1973 – 1974	Non-resident	Ambassador	Resident in Beijing.	
Kaj Björk	1975–1979	Non-resident	Ambassador	Resident in Beijing.	
Erik Cornell	1975–1977	Resident	Chargé d'affaires (Note: Held the diplomatic rank of embassy counsellor.)		
Karlerik Nordenquist	1977–1979	Resident	Chargé d'affaires		
Ingolf Kiesow	1979–1981	Resident	Chargé d'affaires		
Sten Sundfeldt	1980–1982	Non-resident	Ambassador	Resident in Beijing.	
–	1983–1983		Ambassador	Vacant	
Per Fritzson	1982–1983	Resident	Chargé d'affaires		
Ulla Boija	1983–1985	Resident	Chargé d'affaires		
Lars Bergquist	1984–1988	Non-resident	Ambassador	Resident in Beijing.	
Gudmund Naessén	1985–1988	Resident	Chargé d'affaires		
Björn Skala	1988–1991	Non-resident	Ambassador	Resident in Beijing.	
Göran Wide	1989–1992	Resident	Chargé d'affaires		
Sven Linder	1992–1997	Non-resident	Ambassador	Resident in Beijing.	
–	1993–1994		Chargé d'affaires	Vacant	
Åke Lövquist	1995–1997	Resident	Chargé d'affaires		
Kjell Anneling	1997–2002	Non-resident	Ambassador	Resident in Beijing.	
Svante Kilander	1998–2001	Resident	Chargé d'affaires (Note: Held the diplomatic rank of minister.)		
Paul Beijer	2001–2002	Resident	Chargé d'affaires		
Paul Beijer	2002–2005	Resident	Ambassador		
Mats Foyer	2005–2010	Resident	Ambassador		
Barbro Elm	2010–2012	Resident	Ambassador		
Karl-Olof Andersson	2012–2014	Resident	Ambassador		
Torkel Stiernlöf	2014–2017	Resident	Ambassador		
Jonas Wendel	1 September 2017 – 2019	Resident	Ambassador		
Joachim Bergström	1 September 2019 – 2021	Resident	Ambassador		
Andreas Bengtsson	1 September 2021 – 2026	Resident	Ambassador		
Josef Ahlberg	August 2026 – present	Resident	Ambassador		

== See also ==
- North Korea–Sweden relations
