= List of ambassadors of Sweden to Czechoslovakia =

Ambassador of Sweden to Czechoslovakia
- Lesser coat of arms of the Kingdom of Sweden
- Ministry for Foreign Affairs; Swedish Embassy, Prague
- Style: His or Her Excellency (formal); Mr. or Madam Ambassador (informal)
- Reports to: Minister for Foreign Affairs
- Residence: Úvoz 13, Hradčany (Note: The ambassador's residence was at the same location as the chancery.)
- Seat: Prague, Czechoslovakia
- Appointer: Government of Sweden
- Term length: No fixed term
- Formation: 1921
- First holder: Gerhard Löwen
- Final holder: Lars-Åke Nilsson
- Abolished: 1991
- Superseded by: Ambassador of Sweden to the Czech Republic; Ambassador of Sweden to Slovakia

The Ambassador of Sweden to Czechoslovakia (known formally as the Ambassador of the Kingdom of Sweden to Czechoslovakia) was the official representative of the government of Sweden to the president of Czechoslovakia and government of Czechoslovakia.

== History ==
On 24 October 1919, the King in Council decided to recognize the Czechoslovak Republic as an independent and sovereign state.

In 1933, the Swedish government proposed cost-cutting measures within the Ministry for Foreign Affairs. For Prague, this meant that Sweden kept its diplomatic mission, but temporarily left the post of envoy vacant and had the mission headed instead by a lower-ranking diplomat serving as chargé d'affaires ad interim.

In September 1959, an agreement was reached between the Swedish and the Czechoslovak governments on the mutual elevation of the respective countries' legations to embassies. The diplomatic rank was thereafter changed to ambassador instead of envoy extraordinary and minister plenipotentiary.

== List of representatives ==
Name	Period	Title	Resident / Concurrent accreditation	Notes	Presented credentials	Ref
First Czechoslovak Republic (1918–1938)
Gerhard Löwen	21 January 1921 – 1932	Envoy extraordinary and minister plenipotentiary			5 May 1921	
Knut Richard Thyberg	1931–1932	Chargé d'affaires ad interim				
Joen Lagerberg	1 October 1932 – 1935	Chargé d'affaires ad interim				
Joen Lagerberg	26 April 1935 – 1937	Envoy				
Folke Malmar	26 November 1937 – 1939	Envoy			26 January 1938	
–	1939–1945	Envoy		No representation (Note: No representation due to the occupation of Czechoslovakia.)		
Third Czechoslovak Republic (1945–1948)
Torsten Hammarström	1945–1947	Envoy				
Wilhelm Winther	1947–1948	Envoy				
Czechoslovak Republic (1948–1960)
Wilhelm Winther	1948–1950	Envoy				
Sven Allard	1951–1954	Envoy	Also accredited to Budapest			
Carl Olof Gisle	1954 – 30 September 1959	Envoy	Also accredited to Budapest			
Karl Fredrik Almqvist	1959–1960	Ambassador	Also accredited to Budapest			
Czechoslovak Socialist Republic (1960–1990)
Karl Fredrik Almqvist	1960–1962	Ambassador	Also accredited to Budapest			
Harry Bagge	1963–1969	Ambassador	Also accredited to Budapest (1963–1964)			
Agda Rössel	1969–1973	Ambassador				
Carl-George Crafoord	1973–1976	Ambassador				
Marc Giron	1976–1977	Ambassador				
Sigge Lilliehöök	1978–1979	Ambassador				
Bengt Rösiö	1979–1981	Ambassador				
Olof Skoglund	1981–1984	Ambassador				
Karl-Vilhelm Wöhler	1985–1988	Ambassador				
Lars-Åke Nilsson	1988–1991	Ambassador				

== See also ==
- Embassy of Sweden, Prague
