= Olof Lagercrantz =

Swedish writer, critic, and literary scholar (1911–2002)

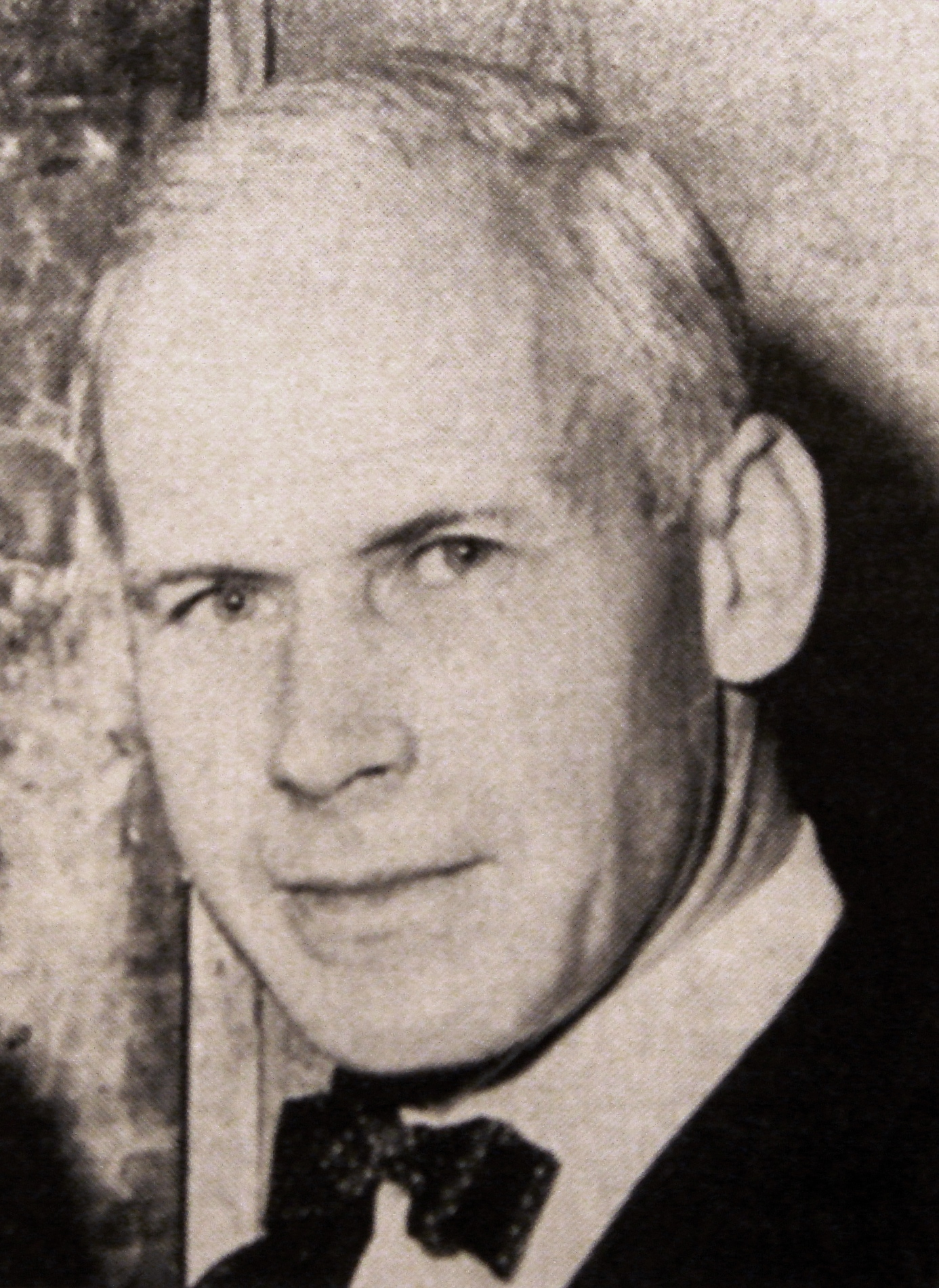
- Born: Olof Gustaf Hugo Lagercrantz; 10 March 1911; Stockholm, Sweden
- Died: 23 July 2002 (aged 91); Ekerö, Sweden
- Occupations: Author, critic, publicist
- Spouse: Martina Ruin (m. 1939)
- Children: 5, including Marika and David
- Writing career
- Period: 1935–1996
- Notable works: From Hell to Paradise; Min första krets

Olof Gustaf Hugo Lagercrantz (10 March 1911 – 23 July 2002) was a Swedish writer, critic, literary scholar (PhD 1951) and publicist (editor-in-chief of Dagens Nyheter 1960–1975).

== Life and career ==
Lagercrantz was born in Stockholm, Sweden, the son of bank director Carl Lagercrantz, of the noble Lagercrantz family, and Countess Agnes Hamilton, whose great-grandfather was the prominent Swedish writer Erik Gustaf Geijer. Lagercrantz married Martina Ruin (born 1921), daughter of Professor Hans Ruin and Karin Sievers, in 1939. Lagercrantz is the father of actress Marika Lagercrantz and author David Lagercrantz. His sister Lis Asklund was an author, social worker, curator, and program producer for Sveriges Radio. His nephews Lars and Johan Lönnroth are also famous in their own right.

His childhood was dark, under the clouds of his mother's mental illness and later his sister's suicide.

Lagercrantz commanded considerable influence as a critic and publicist. He became an expert of sorts in literary biography, and several of his studies on important Swedish writers are still cornerstones of Swedish literary studies, in particular, his biography of August Strindberg (1979) and his portrait of his friend Gunnar Ekelöf, Jag bor i en annan värld men du bor ju i samma.

During the latter part of his professional life, Lagercrantz' concerns in his role as literary critic and cultural pundit progressed from the strictly aesthetic to the political. Lagercrantz' political engagement became apparent during his time at Dagens Nyheter, where he was head of the cultural section from 1951 and editor-in-chief from 1960 on. He was an influential, albeit controversial, voice in the political and cultural radicalism of the 1960s and 1970s, assuming a crucial role in the national secularization debate.

Lagercrantz in his public role gave rise to strong emotions. His cultural radicalism in particular was perceived as provocative in light of his aristocratic background. Lagercrantz was widely criticized for the conciliatory and fairly positive appraisals of Communism that he published in Dagens Nyheter after travelling as a journalist to the Soviet Union and China.

Lagercrantz dwelt on parts of this in his autobiographical works. His upper-class childhood and adolescence are the subject of Min första krets (1982), and the turbulence of his time at Dagens Nyheter is the topic of his memoir Ett år på sextiotalet (1990).

Lagercrantz grew up in Falköping and in 2001 was awarded the title of Honorary Resident of Skaraborg by the Skaraborg Academy in tribute to the fact he had wielded one of the mightiest pens of the 20th century. He was also awarded the Illis quorum by the government of Sweden in 1996.

== Bibliography ==
- Den döda fågeln ("The Dead Bird", 1935, poems) OCLC 13259316
- Den enda sommaren ("The Only Summer", 1937, poems) OCLC 8582894
- Jungfrun och demonerna ("The Maiden and the Demons", 1938, a study of Erik Axel Karlfeldt) OCLC 492621585
- Trudi (1939, novel) OCLC 483238582
- Finlands sak är vår (1939) OCLC 187085656
- Möten med bibeln ("Facing the Bible", 1941) OCLC 487630227
- Dikter från mossen ("Poems from the Bog", 1943) OCLC 186791320
- Om kärlek ("On Love", 1946) OCLC 493959725
- Fågelropet ur dimman ("The Bird's Call Out of the Fog", 1947, essays) OCLC 464968262
- Studieplan i svensk lyrik ("Syllabus of Swedish Lyric Poetry", 1950) OCLC 867827320
- Agnes von Krusenstierna (1951, revised 1980, literary study) ISSN 0348-6133
- Dagbok ("Diary", 1954) OCLC 470808663
- Dikter och dagbok ("Poems and Diary", 1955) OCLC 185273405
- Stig Dagerman (1958, literary study) OCLC 492621925
- Ensamheter i öst och väst ("Solitudes in the East and the West", 1961, travel literature) OCLC 186017473
- Svenska lyriker ("Swedish Lyric Poets", 1961) OCLC 185734048
- Linjer ("Lines", 1962, poems) OCLC 483238448
- Från helvetet till paradiset ("From Hell to Paradise", 1964, a study of Dante) OCLC 312822274
- Dikter 1935–1962 ("Poems 1935–1962", 1964) OCLC 473451351
- Den pågående skapelsen ("The Creation in Progress", 1966, a study of Nelly Sachs) OCLC 186114862
- Opinionslägen ("Current Opinions", 1968) OCLC 13250136
- Att finnas till ("To Exist", 1970, a study of James Joyce) OCLC 925651837
- Tröst för min älskling ("Comfort for My Beloved", 1971) OCLC 187104206
- Tretton lyriker och Fågeltruppen ("Thirteen Lyric Poets and the Troop of Birds", 1973) ISBN 9789146119692
- Enhörningen ("The Unicorn", 1977, prose) ISBN 9789146129073
- Från Aeneas till Ahlin ("From Aeneas to Ahlin", 1978) ISBN 9789146131670
- August Strindberg (1979, literary study) ISBN 9789146134770
- Eftertankar om Strindberg ("Second Thoughts on Strindberg", 1980) ISBN 9789170543531
- Min första krets ("My First Circle", 1982, autobiography) ISBN 9789146141051
- Om konsten att läsa och skriva ("On the Art of Reading and Writing", 1985, essay) ISBN 9789146148005
- Färd med mörkrets hjärta ("A Journey with the Heart of Darkness", 1987, a study of Joseph Conrad) ISBN 9789146154501
- Ett år på sextiotalet ("A Year in the 60s", 1990, autobiography) ISBN 9789146158646
- En blödande ros ("A Bleeding Rose", 1991, selected poems) ISBN 9789146160090
- Att läsa Proust ("Reading Proust", 1992) ISBN 9789146164159
- Jag bor i en annan värld, men du bor ju i samma ("I Live in Another World, but You Live in the Same", 1994, a study of Gunnar Ekelöf) ISBN 9789146165453
- Mina egna ord ("My Own Words", 1994, selection of articles from Dagens Nyheter) ISBN 9789146165477
- Dikten om livet på den andra sidan ("The Poem of Life on the Other Side", 1996, a study of Emanuel Swedenborg) ISBN 9789146169321
