= Jessica Pilnäs =

- Born: 5 July 1978 (age 47); Åryd, Sweden
- Genres: soul
- Occupation: singer

Jessica Georganne Pilnäs (born 5 July 1978 in Åryd, Växjö ) is a Swedish singer perhaps mostly known for her song "Jag ger dig allt" (English: I give you all). She sang the song in Melodifestivalen 1995, and came in third place. In 2000, her song, "Pretender", which she recorded under the name Isa, also became a hit single in Sweden.

Born in Åryd, she is the daughter of Thommy Gustafsson, keyboard player for the Swedish band Sven-Ingvars.

== Discography ==
=== Albums ===
- 2011: Bitter and Sweet
- 2012: Norma Deloris Egstrom - A Tribute to Peggy Lee

=== Singles ===
- 1995: "Jag ger dig allt"
- 2000: "Pretender" (under the name Isa)
