= Stig Åsberg =

Swedish graphic artist

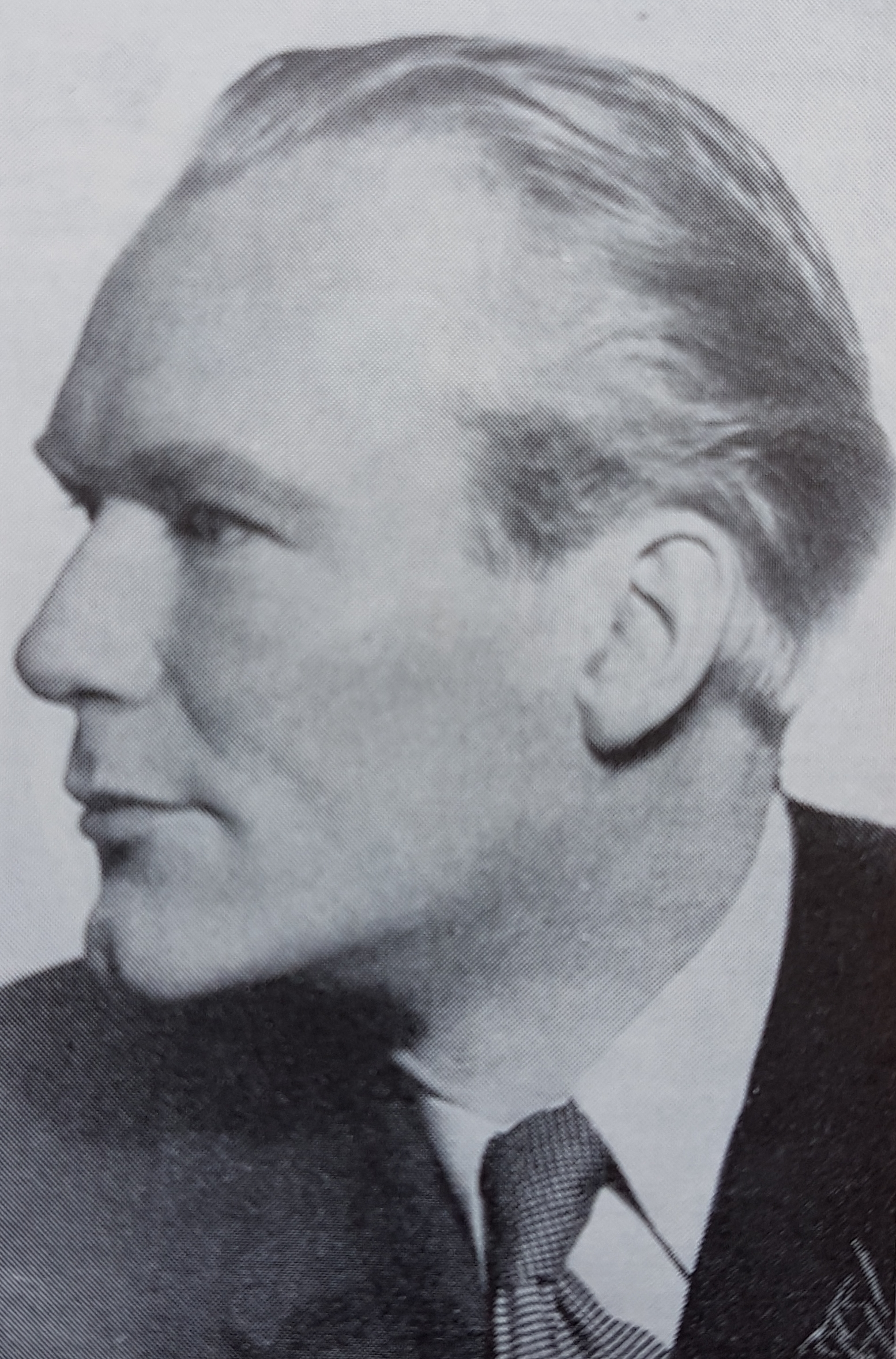
Stig Åsberg

Stig Åsberg (1909, Baku — 1968, Stockholm) was a Swedish graphic artist.

He studied at Konstfack in Stockholm and had a breakthrough in 1936 with illustrations made for a book by Gustav Sandgren. He developed a close cooperation with several Swedish writers. Apart from illustrations for books, he also designed postage stamps and notably etchings, often of landscapes. He was influenced by the experience of living in several of the countries around the Baltic Sea as a child and by the harsh conditions under which he lived as a youth, on the verge of starvation, in Södermanland. He has been described as depicting "intimately poetic landscapes and meticulously reproduced plants and animals, often complicated by surreal or macabre traits".

There are works by Åsberg in the collections of Nationalmuseum, Stockholm and the National Gallery of Denmark, Copenhagen, among others.

== Bibliography ==
- Martling, Göran (2003). Stig Åsberg. En svensk grafiker (in Swedish). Atlantis förlag. ISBN 91-7486-775-X.
