= Tjällmo =

- Location within Östergötland Location within Sweden
- Coordinates: 58°43′N 15°21′E
- Country: Sweden
- Province: Östergötland
- County: Östergötland County
- Municipality: Motala Municipality

Area
  - Total: 0.71 km^{2} (0.27 sq mi)

Population (31 December 2010)
  - Total: 557
  - Density: 783/km^{2} (2,030/sq mi)
- Time zone: UTC+1 (CET)
  - Summer (DST): UTC+2 (CEST)

Tjällmo is a locality situated in Motala Municipality, Östergötland County, Sweden with 557 inhabitants in 2010.

== Riksdag elections ==
Year	%	Votes	V	S	MP	C	L	KD	M	SD	NyD	Left	Right
1973	93.7	879	1.4	44.6		35.0	2.5	5.2	11.3			46.0	48.8
1976	93.7	878	1.5	43.4		36.6	3.5	3.3	11.6			44.9	51.7
1979	92.9	875	2.5	43.1		35.2	2.7	2.4	13.8			45.6	51.8
1982	92.8	866	2.3	44.8	0.5	31.3	2.4	3.9	14.8			47.1	48.5
1985	91.9	857	2.6	42.2	0.7	32.9	7.9		13.4			44.8	54.3
1988	88.5	826	1.7	42.6	4.6	31.8	5.8	3.0	10.4			48.9	48.1
1991	87.2	844	2.5	34.5	2.6	23.3	4.9	8.9	13.7		9.0	37.0	50.8
1994	89.9	852	4.7	42.7	5.4	20.8	3.2	4.1	18.0		0.7	52.8	46.0
1998	86.0	768	11.8	34.5	3.3	15.6	1.7	16.0	16.3			49.6	49.6
2002	79.8	702	6.1	40.5	2.1	18.9	6.1	12.4	10.8	1.0		48.7	48.3
2006	83.4	750	3.6	36.3	1.3	20.9	4.3	6.8	19.9	2.9		41.2	51.9
2010	85.7	735	4.5	35.6	3.8	15.9	5.3	4.8	26.4	3.0		43.9	52.4
2014	87.3	746	5.1	32.7	4.0	13.9	2.7	3.4	18.4	18.0		41.8	38.3
2018	86.6	781	5.4	28.2	1.5	12.0	1.9	7.0	16.0	26.0		47.1	51.0
