= Åryd, Växjö Municipality =

Åryd
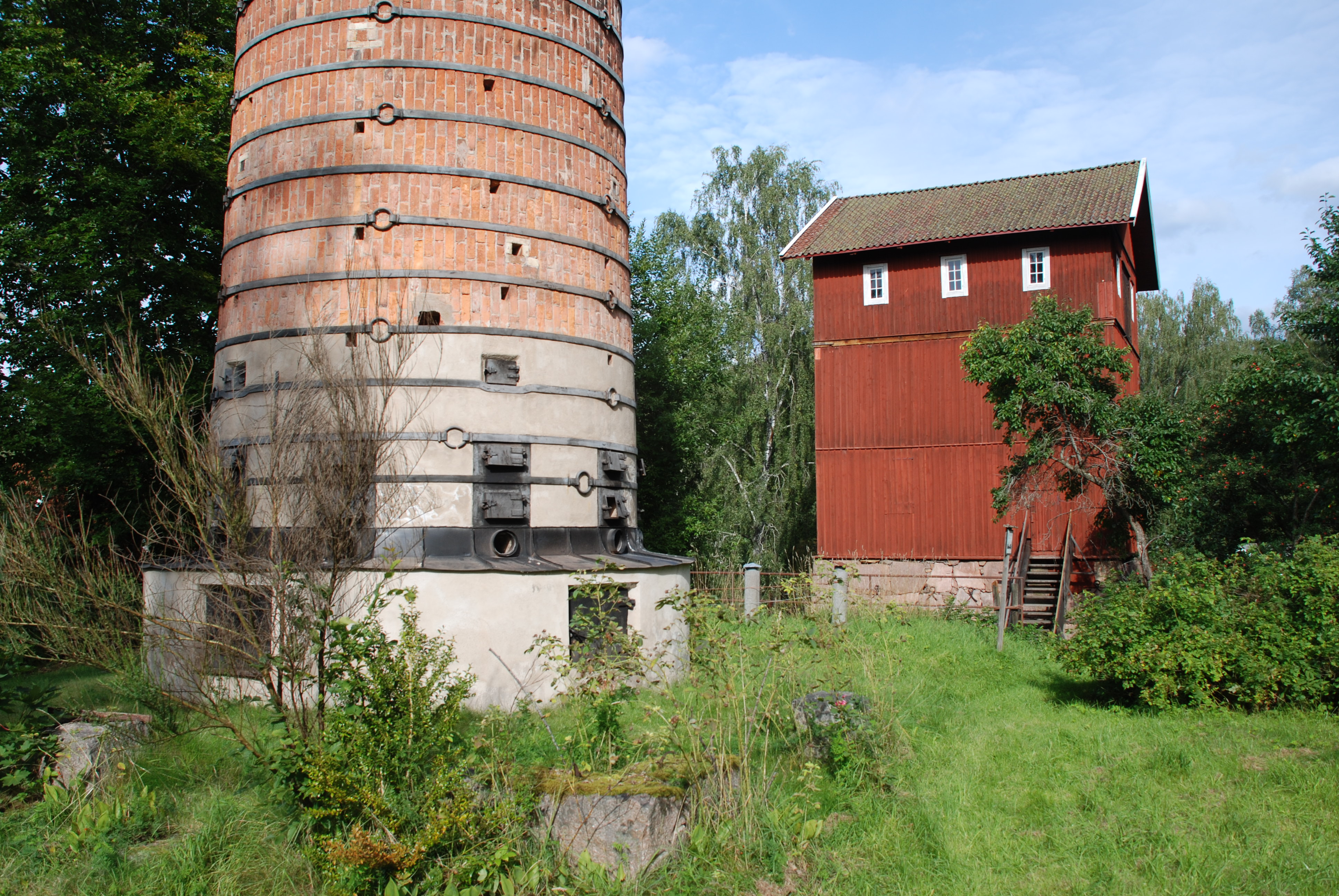
- Old iron furnaces

- Location within Kronoberg Location within Sweden
- Coordinates: 56°50′N 14°59′E
- Country: Sweden
- Province: Småland
- County: Kronoberg County
- Municipality: Växjö Municipality

Area
  - Total: 0.81 km^{2} (0.31 sq mi)

Population (31 December 2010)
  - Total: 684
  - Density: 845/km^{2} (2,190/sq mi)
- Time zone: UTC+1 (CET)
  - Summer (DST): UTC+2 (CEST)

Åryd is a locality situated in Växjö Municipality, Kronoberg County, Sweden with 684 inhabitants in 2010.

Singer Jessica G. Pilnäs who participated in Melodifestivalen 1995, finishing third, was born in Åryd.
