= Einar Löfstedt =

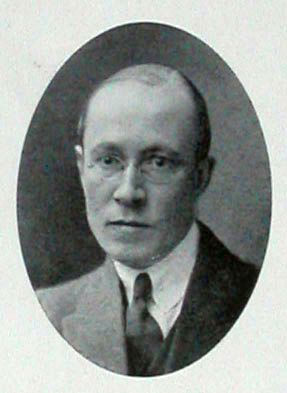

Haimon Einar Harald Löfstedt (15 June 1880 – 10 June 1955) was a Swedish Latinist and classical philologist. His father, also named Einar Löfstedt, was a scholar of Greek.

He was Professor of Roman Oratory and Poetry at Lund University from 1913. Löfstedt was a member of the Swedish Academy, of the Royal Swedish Academy of Sciences, of the Göttingen Academy of Sciences, a corresponding fellow of the British Academy, and a member of the Bavarian Academy of Sciences and of the Prussian Academy of Sciences.

His daughter Ingrid Arvidsson was a noted Swedish poet.
