= Ingrid Arvidsson =

Swedish author (1919–2023)

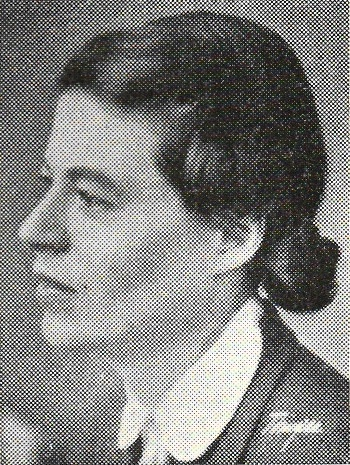
- Arvidsson in 1959
- Born: 3 July 1919; Lund, Sweden
- Died: 7 May 2023 (aged 103); Stockholm, Sweden
- Occupation: Author
- Spouse: Karl Axel Arvidsson

Ingrid Helena Arvidsson (née Löfstedt, 3 July 1919 – 7 May 2023) was a Swedish poet, author, diplomat, and journalist.

== Biography ==
Arvidsson was born to Einar Löfstedt, a Latin professor, and Annie Günther, a literary critic, on 3 July 1919 in Lund. She spent her early years living amongst the local academic community. She later wrote an essay about her childhood years entitled Muren runt Lundagård (The Walls Round Lundagård) which was published in 1955. Arvidsson graduated from high school in 1938, and received her bachelor's degree from Lund University in 1941.

Following graduation Arvidsson worked as a substitute journalist for a number of rural publications, and from 1942–1944 worked for the Swedish women's publication Idun in Stockholm. In 1951 she made her debut as a poet with the book Danser (Dancer). She continued to publish poetry until 1964, when her output slowed (but did not stop) due to other commitments. After retiring she took up poetry again, and had two collections of poetry published during the 1990s. In 2005 a further book of poetry entitled Det röda (The Red) was published under the Albert Bonniers förlag imprint.

Arvidsson also worked from 1949 to 1966 as a film reviewer for the Swedish publications Veckojournalen and Vi, and from 1966–1972 was the cultural attaché for the Swedish embassy in Washington DC. After returning from the United States Arvidsson became a programme controller for Swedish Radio from 1973 to 1984. Her husband, the art critic and radio personality Karl Arvidsson, died in 1962.

Arvidsson died in Stockholm on 7 May 2023, at the age of 103.

== Bibliography ==
- Personligt bagage (Stockholm: Bonniers, 1975), ISBN 91-0-040680-5
- Tal på Övralid 1977 (Skänninge: Heidenstamsällskapet, 1979)
- Under ytan (Stockholm: Bonniers, 1986), ISBN 91-0-047105-4
- Öden i vår tid (Stockholm: Rabén & Sjögren, 1987), ISBN 91-29-58319-5
- En glimmande vägg (Stockholm: Bonniers, 1992), ISBN 91-0-055516-9
- Rummet innanför (Stockholm: Bonniers, 1999), ISBN 91-0-056850-3
- Det röda (Stockholm: Bonniers, 2005), ISBN 91-0-010539-2
