= Wachtmeister (surname) =

Wachtmeister (German for "sergeant" or "constable") is a Swedish and Austrian surname. Notable people with the surname include:

- Alice Trolle-Wachtmeister (1926–2017), Swedish countess
- Axel Wachtmeister (1643–1699), Swedish count and field marshal
- Carl Wachtmeister (disambiguation), several people
- Constance Wachtmeister (1838–1910), English/French countess, theosophist
- Erik Wachtmeister (born 1955), co-founder of ASmallWorld
- Fredrik Wachtmeister (1855–1919), Swedish politician and diplomat
- Gustaf Wachtmeister (1757–1826), Swedish Army officer
- Hans Wachtmeister (1642–1714), admiral general of the Swedish Navy
- Ian Wachtmeister (1932–2017), Swedish industrialist and politician
- Louise Wachtmeister (born 1978), co-founder of ASmallWorld
- Rosina Wachtmeister (born 1939), Austrian artist
- Ted Wachtmeister (1892–1975), Swedish jurist, reserve officer and rower
- Wilhelm Wachtmeister (1923–2012), Swedish diplomat
