= Wachtmeister (disambiguation) =

Wachtmeister is a German, Austrian and Swiss military rank of non-commissioned officers.

Wachtmeister may also refer to:

- Wachtmeister (surname)
- HSwMS Wachtmeister, several ships of the Swedish Navy
- Wachtmeister family, a Swedish noble family
