= Wachtmeister family =

Swedish noble family

Wachtmeister
- Swedish noble family
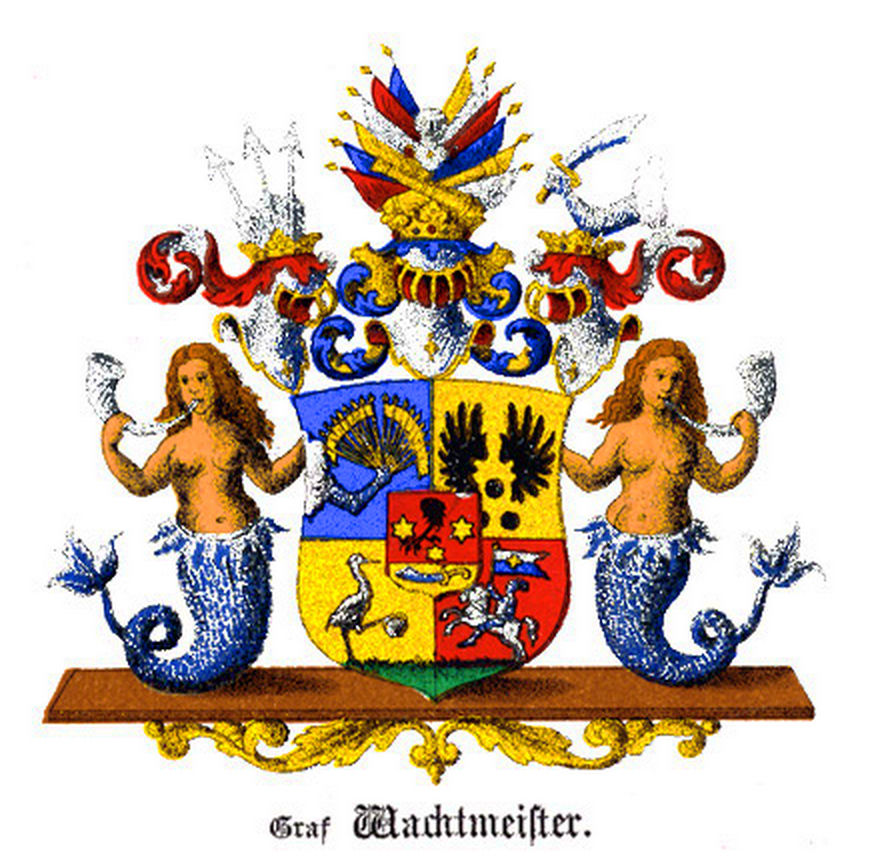
- Coat of arms of the Wachtmeister family
- Country: Sweden
- Current region: Northern Europe
- Origin: Livonia

The Wachtmeister family (Swedish pronunciation: [ˈvaktmεjstər]; German pronunciation: [vaxtˈmaɪ̯stɐ]) is a Swedish noble family from Livonia, who immigrated to Sweden in the 16th century. The name Wachtmeister is German for 'sergeant'.

The family divided in 1683 and was introduced at the Swedish House of Nobility in 1689 through two major distinct lines: the baronial Wachtmeister af Björkö no. 31 and the countly Wachtmeister af Johannishus no. 25. The baronial line within Sweden eventually became extinct on 11 July 1889. Though extinct in Sweden, the Björkö line continues to exist as part of the German nobility. The head of this house is the Prussian Count Axel-Dietrich von Wachtmeister (born 1941). The comital branch in Germany comes from a specific offshoot of the Björkö line that was formally integrated into the Prussian nobility and elevated into a comital dignity on 17 January 1816.

== History ==
The Swedish noble families of Wachtmeister, which originated from Hans Wachtmeister, who came from Livonia to Sweden and was ennobled in 1578. His grandson Hans became a Friherre with Björkö (in Karelia) in 1651 and is the progenitor of the baronial family of Wachtmeister af Björkö. Two of his sons became counts, namely Hans in 1687, progenitor of the comital family of Wachtmeister af Johannishus, and Axel in 1693, progenitor of the comital family of Wachtmeister af Mälsåker (in Södermanland), which dissolved on the "sword side" (svärdssidan, literally "on the side of the sword") in 1708. The aforementioned Friherre ("Baron") Hans Wachtmeister's grandson Karl Adam received count's dignity in 1799. His nephew, Friherre Karl Axel Didrik (1780–1837), who left Swedish service in 1806 with the rank of Lieutenant Colonel and settled in Pomerania, became a Prussian count in 1816.

Count Hans Wachtmeister af Johannishus' grandson's son, the Lord High Steward Carl Axel Wachtmeister, adopted, with the support of a royal letter on 5 April 1808, after his mother he took up the entailed estate of Trolleberg, the name Trolle-Wachtmeister. This name, along with the Trolle coat of arms in conjunction with that of the Wachtmeister coat of arms, must be borne by his descendant of the Wachtmeister family, who holds the mentioned entailed estate (the right of the entailed estate was transferred in 1830 from Trolleberg to Ljungby, later called Trolle-Ljungby).

== Wachtmeister af Björkö no. 31 ==
- Hans Wachtmeister (1609–1652), Major General, Riksråd and Master of the Horse
  - Eva Juliana Wachtmeister (1639–1666), married to Count Bengt Gabrielsson Oxenstierna (1661–1666)

== Wachtmeister af Johannishus no. 25 ==
- Hans Wachtmeister (1641–1714), admiral general of the Swedish Navy
  - Carl Hans Wachtmeister (1689–1736), Admiral
    - Fredrik Georg Hans Carl Wachtmeister (1720–1792), officer
      - Carl Axel Trolle-Wachtmeister (1754–1810), Lord of the Realm, Lord High Steward, Minister for Justice
        - Hans Gabriel Trolle-Wachtmeister (1782–1871), Minister for Justice
          - Axel Knut Trolle-Wachtmeister (1812–1907), County Governor
            - Hans Gustaf Trolle-Wachtmeister (1846–1922), senior valet de chambre (överstekammarjunkare)
              - Oskar Carl-Axel Fredrik Trolle-Wachtmeister (1893–1956), Hovjägmästare
                - Hans-Gabriel Trolle–Wachtmeister (1923–2023), was married to Alice Viktoria Tornérhielm (1926–2017)
            - Axel Fredrik Wachtmeister (1858–1889), married Engla Elisabeth Carlsson
              - Georg Axel Albert Wachtmeister (1884–1971), married Djardul Flavia Maniassi-Zadé Ljungqvist, then Karin Hount Johannesen
      - Hans Fredrik Wachtmeister (1752–1807), Rear Admiral
        - Hans Wachtmeister (1793–1827), jurist, civil servant, county governor
          - Hans Wachtmeister (1828–1905), county governor, member of parliament, writer.
            - Hans Hansson Wachtmeister (1851–1929), politician
            - Axel Hansson Wachtmeister (1855–1926), officer, politician, county governor
              - Arvid Wachtmeister (1889–1961), jurist, writer
                - Carl Axel Wachtmeister (1924–2017), professor
            - Carl Alarik Wachtmeister (1865–1925), vice admiral
              - Alarik Wachtmeister (1890–1953), rear admiral
                - Alarik Wachtmeister (1922–2013), sales director
            - Hugo Hansson Wachtmeister (1867–1940), farmer, writer, member of parliament.
        - Carl Axel Wachtmeister (1795–1865), Chamberlain
          - Axel Wachtmeister (1827–1899), Lord Chancellor, Member of Parliament
            - Henning Wachtmeister (1869–1940), mill owner, member of parliament
              - Baltzar Wachtmeister (1895–1960), chamberlain
              - Welam Wachtmeister (1897–1973), chamberlain, cavalry captain
          - Carolina Lovisa Wachtmeister (1826–1910), married to Friherre Louis Gerhard De Geer, Prime Minister of Sweden
            - Gerhard Louis De Geer (1854–1935), Prime Minister of Sweden
            - Gerard De Geer (1858–1943), geologist
              - Sten De Geer (1886–1933), professor
          - Axel Fredrik Wachtmeister (1827–1899), Chamberlain
            - Ulrika Charlotta Elisabet (1855-1913), married Count Magnus Gabriel de La Gardie (1839-1905)
            - Carl Axel Baltzar Wachtmeister (1856–1935), First Crown Equerry
              - Gustaf Axel Otto Wachtmeister (1887–1978), cabinet chamberlain
                - Wilhelm Wachtmeister (1923–2012), diplomat
                  - Erik Wachtmeister (born 1955), Internet entrepreneur, married to Louise Wachtmeister (née Austern)
              - Otto Carl Fredrik Wachtmeister (1897–1938), Hovjägmästare
                - Brita Elisabeth (EÄ Elisabet) (Beth) Wachtmeister (1926–1972), married to Count Carl Carlsson Bonde af Björnö (1962–1972)
      - Gustaf Wachtmeister (1757–1826), General, Lord of the Realm
        - Gustaf Wachtmeister (1792–1859), lieutenant colonel
          - Fredrik Wachtmeister (1830–1889), captain, landowner, member of parliament
            - Carl Wachtmeister (1869–1941), colonel
              - Arvid Wachtmeister (1924–2004), landowner
        - Claes Adam Wachtmeister (1795–1873), lieutenant colonel
          - Axel Fredrik Claesson Wachtmeister (1855–1919), Minister for Foreign Affairs
            - Nils Claes Ludvig Wachtmeister (1891–1960), Hovstallmästare
              - Gunnila Wachtmeister (1923–2016), was married to Carl Johan Bernadotte
            - Shering "Ted" Wachtmeister (1892–1975), jurist
              - Bengt Fredrik Shering Wachtmeister (1921–2006),
                - Yvonne Wachtmeister (born 1951), married Prince Ludwig Ferdinand of Sayn-Wittgenstein-Berleburg (b. 1942)
                  - Princess Anna of Bavaria (born 1978), married to Prince Manuel of Bavaria (born 1972)
                  - Prince August Fredrik zu Sayn-Wittgenstein-Berleburg (born 1981)
                  - Princess Theodora zu Sayn-Wittgenstein-Berleburg (born 1986)
              - Nils Erik Gustaf Wachtmeister (1923–2003), Swedish Army colonel
              - Thomas Axel Wilhelm "Tom" Wachtmeister (1931–2011), businessman
              - Ian Wachtmeister (1932–2017), industrialist and politician
              - Georg Carl Gustaf Wachtmeister (born 1940),
              - Sten Ted Patrick Wachtmeister (born 1945), businessman
            - Louise Violet Gunilla Wachtmeister (1899–1992), married to Ambassador Erik Boheman (1919–1927)
        - Alarik Wachtmeister (1804–1887), officer
        - Vilhelm Wachtmeister (1809–1879), landowner
      - Claes Adam Wachtmeister (1755–1828), Admiral
        - Carl Johan Wachtmeister (1793–1843), Adjutant General
          - Carl Wachtmeister (1823–1871), Envoy, Lord of the Realm, Minister for Foreign Affairs, married to Constance de Bourbel de Montpincon (1838–1910)
          - Gotthard Wachtmeister (1834–1920), County Governor
            - Johan Fredrik Wachtmeister (1869–1950), Swedish Army lieutenant colonel
              - Carl Johan Wachtmeister (1903–1993), Swedish Army colonel and fencer
        - Christina Hilda Wachtmeister (1796–1871), married to Lieutenant General, Baron Bror Cederström (1780–1877)

== Wachtmeister af Mälsåker no. 39 ==
- Axel Wachtmeister (1643–1699), field marshal
  - Eleonora Margareta Wachtmeister (1684–1748), married to Count Hans Reinhold von Fersen (1683–1736)
    - Carl von Fersen (1716–1786), Överhovjägmästare
    - Axel von Fersen (1719–1794), Lord Marshal of the Riksdag of the Estates, married to Hedvig Catharina von Fersen (1732–1800)
      - Axel von Fersen (1755–1810), General, Marshal of the Realm of Sweden, Lord of the Realm
      - Sophie von Fersen (1757–1816), Lady-in-waiting
      - Fabian von Fersen (1762–1818), politician, officer, courtier
      - Hedvig "Hedda" Eleonora von Fersen (1753–1792), Lady-in-waiting

== Others ==
- Carl Wachtmeister (born 1989), footballer
