= List of ambassadors of Sweden to Denmark =

Ambassador of Sweden to Denmark
- Lesser coat of arms of the Kingdom of Sweden

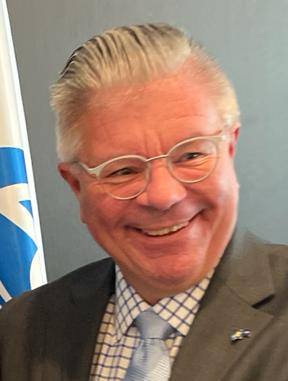
- Incumbent; Hans Wallmark since 2024
- Ministry for Foreign Affairs; Swedish Embassy, Copenhagen
- Style: His or Her Excellency (formal); Mr. or Madam Ambassador (informal)
- Reports to: Minister for Foreign Affairs
- Residence: Sankt Annæ Plads 15
- Seat: Copenhagen, Denmark
- Appointer: Government of Sweden
- Term length: No fixed term
- Inaugural holder: Pehr Adlerfelt
- Formation: 1719
- Website: Swedish Embassy, Copenhagen

The Ambassador of Sweden to Denmark (known formally as the Ambassador of the Kingdom of Sweden to the Kingdom of Denmark) is the official representative of the government of Sweden to the monarch and government of Denmark.

== History ==
In September 1947, an agreement was reached between the Swedish and Danish governments on the mutual elevation of the respective countries' legations to embassies. The diplomatic rank was thereafter changed to ambassador instead of envoy extraordinary and minister plenipotentiary. In the same month, Ambassador Gustaf von Dardel presented his credentials to King Frederik IX at Fredensborg Palace.

== List of representatives ==
Name	Period	Title	Notes	Presented credentials	Ref
Pehr Adlerfelt	11 April 1720 – 16 August 1725	Minister		24 May 1720	
Nils Örncrona	29 January 1728 – 18 April 1734	Minister plenipotentiary	Died in office		
Anders Skutenhjelm	1734–1739	Minister			
Nils Palmstierna	6 November 1739 (Note: Probably on 6 November and no later than 13 November 1739.) – 31 October 1743	Minister plenipotentiary	Left Copenhagen on 25 January 1744		
Carl Gustaf Tessin	1743–1744	Ambassador			
Carl Fredrik von Höpken	20 March 1744 – 1747	Minister			
Otto Fleming	8 February 1748 – 1755	Envoy			
Carl Alexander von Ungern Sternberg	1756–1760	Envoy			
Johan Vilhelm Sprengtporten	1761–1787	Envoy			
Bengt Faxell	21 March 1763 – ?	Chargé d'affaires ad interim			
Adam Horn	19 August 1766 – ?	Ambassador			
Bengt Faxell	6 May 1767 – 11 September 1769	Chargé d'affaires ad interim			
Gustaf d'Albedyhll	15 September 1784 – November 1785	Minister en second	Assumed office in January 1785.		
Johan Vilhelm Sprengtporten	1787–1795	Ambassador			
Fredrik Wilhelm von Ehrenheim	27 September 1790 – 1794	Chargé d'affaires			
Fredrik Wilhelm von Ehrenheim	18 March 1794 – 1797	Minister			
Fredrik Wilhelm von Ehrenheim	15 December 1797 – 1797	Envoy extraordinary			
Carl Gustaf Oxenstierna	1798–1813	Envoy			
Carl Hochschild	13 September 1819 – 1821	Chargé d'affaires			
Johan Henrik Tawast	1814–1821	Envoy			
Carl Hochschild	27 May 1821 – 1836	Envoy			
Elias Lagerheim	13 July 1836 – 1856	Envoy			
Georg Adelswärd	July 1841	Chargé d'affaires ad interim			
Otto Gabriel Mörner af Morlanda	19 April 1843	Chargé d'affaires			
Wilhelm af Wetterstedt	9 May 1856 – 1856	Chargé d'affaires			
Christian Adolph Virgin	5 December 1856 – 1858	Envoy extraordinary and minister plenipotentiary	Also appointed on 6 June 1858		
Carl Wachtmeister	16 December 1858 – 1861	Envoy extraordinary and minister plenipotentiary			
Henning Ludvig Hugo Hamilton	20 July 1861 — 19 February 1864	Envoy extraordinary and minister plenipotentiary			
Oscar Magnus Fredrik Björnstjerna	27 February 1864 – 1865	Minister ad interim			
Carl Wachtmeister	31 October 1865 – 1868	Envoy extraordinary and minister plenipotentiary			
Eugène von Stedingk	7 May 1868 – 1869	Minister plenipotentiary ad interim			
Eugène von Stedingk	1 June 1869 – 16 December 1870	Envoy			
Lave Gustaf Beck-Friis	16 December 1870 – 3 October 1902	Envoy extraordinary and minister plenipotentiary			
Carl Snoilsky	August 1875 – November 1875	Chargé d'affaires			
Ove Gude	1902–1905	Envoy			
Eric Hallin	1904–1905	Chargé d'affaires			
Eric Trolle	30 June 1905 – November 1905	Envoy extraordinary and minister plenipotentiary			
Hjalmar Hammarskjöld	17 November 1905 – 1907	Envoy	Appointed on 28 September 1906		
Carl von Heidenstam	1906–1910	Chargé d'affaires ad interim			
Herman Lagercrantz	18 January 1908 – 17 June 1908	Acting Envoy			
Ernst Axel Günther	1908–1918	Minister			
Joachim Beck-Friis	11 June 1918 – 1928	Envoy extraordinary and minister plenipotentiary			
Patrik Reuterswärd	1918–1918	Chargé d'affaires ad interim			
Patrik Reuterswärd	1919–1919	Chargé d'affaires ad interim			
Claës Bonde	18 December 1919 – 31 December 1921	Chargé d'affaires ad interim			
Oskar Ewerlöf	1929 – 22 October 1934	Envoy	Died in office		
Carl Hamilton af Hageby	1934–1941	Envoy			
Gustaf von Dardel	1941 – September 1947	Envoy			
Gustaf von Dardel	September 1947 – 1 October 1948	Ambassador			
Herman Eriksson	1 October 1948 (Note: Appointed on 26 August 1948 but never took office on 1 October.)	Ambassador	Political appointee (non-career diplomat). Never took office.		
Gustaf von Dardel	1 January 1949 – 29 June 1949	Acting ambassador			
Hans Beck-Friis	1949–1956	Ambassador			
Stig Sahlin	1957 – 11 June 1963	Ambassador	Died in office		
Åke Jonsson	1963–1963	Chargé d'affaires			
Rolf Sohlman	14 January 1964 – 1965	Ambassador			
Ragnvald Bagge	1965–1969	Ambassador			
Herman Kling	1969–1973	Ambassador	Political appointee (non-career diplomat)		
Hubert de Bèsche	1973–1977	Ambassador			
Tord Hagen	1977–1980	Ambassador			
Carl Swartz	1980–1981	Ambassador			
Claës Ivar Wollin	1981–1984	Ambassador			
Carl De Geer	1984–1988	Ambassador			
Anders Ferm	1988–1990	Ambassador	Political appointee (non-career diplomat)		
Carl-Johan Groth	1990–1996	Ambassador			
Håkan Berggren	1996–2000	Ambassador			
Carl-Magnus Hyltenius	2000–2005	Ambassador			
Lars Grundberg	2005–2010	Ambassador			
Inga Eriksson Fogh	2010–2015	Ambassador			
Fredrik Jörgensen	2015–2020	Ambassador		13 October 2015	
Charlotte Wrangberg	September 2020 – 2024	Ambassador		9 September 2020	
Hans Wallmark	2024–present	Ambassador	Political appointee (non-career diplomat)	4 September 2024	

== See also ==
- Denmark–Sweden relations
- Embassy of Sweden, Copenhagen
