= Baltzar von Platen =

Baltzar von Platen may refer to:

- Baltzar von Platen (1766–1829), Swedish naval officer and statesman
- Baltzar von Platen (1804–1875), Swedish noble and naval officer
- Baltzar von Platen (inventor) (1898–1984), Swedish inventor
