= Herman Kling =

Swedish politician and diplomat (1913–1985)

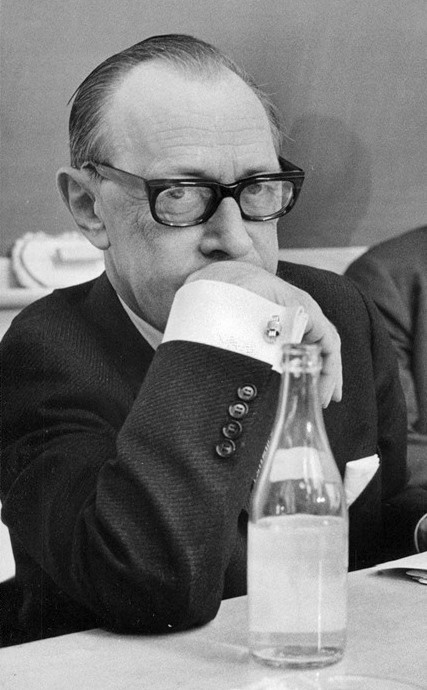

Ambassador of Sweden to Portugal
- In office 1973–1979
- Preceded by: Karl Fredrik Almqvist
- Succeeded by: Sven Fredrik Hedin

Ambassador of Sweden to Denmark
- In office 1969–1973
- Preceded by: Ragnvald Bagge
- Succeeded by: Hubert de Bèsche

Minister for Justice
- In office 1 December 1959 – 14 October 1969
- Prime Minister: Tage Erlander
- Preceded by: Ingvar Lindell
- Succeeded by: Lennart Geijer

Personal details
- Born: 12 June 1913 Västanfors, Sweden
- Died: 13 June 1985 (aged 72) Malmö, Sweden
- Party: Social Democratic
- Spouse: Karin Kropp (m. 1944–1985)
- Children: 1
- Profession: Jurist

Erik Herman Kling (12 July 1913 – 13 June 1985) was a Swedish politician and diplomat. He served as a member of the Riksdag for the Swedish Social Democratic Party and as minister for justice from 1959 to 1969. Kling served as ambassador in Copenhagen from 1969 to 1973 and in Lisbon from 1973 to 1979.

== Early life ==
Kling was born on 12 July 1913 in Västanfors, Sweden, the son of August Kling and his wife Hilda (née Östling). He passed studentexamen in 1933 and received a Candidate of Law degree in Stockholm in 1938.

== Career ==
Kling worked as an extraordinary notary in Stockholm City Court in 1938 and he became an assistant (amanuens) in 1941. He then worked as acting assessor in 1942, as vice assessor in 1946 and as head of the Lagbyrå in the Ministry of Agriculture in 1945. Kling worked as an acting director general for administrative affairs (expeditionschef) in 1947 and as State Secretary in the Ministry for Civil Service Affairs in 1950. He was then Director General and head of the Swedish Agency for Administrative Development (Statskontoret) from 1956, minister without portfolio from 1957 to 1959 and minister for justice and head of the Ministry of Justice from 1959 to 1969. During his ten years as minister for justice, Kling presented several notable laws, the most important of which were the preparations for the new constitutional laws, which, however, were adopted after his resignation. The Penal Code, the Copyright Act, the Land Code also derive from his time, as well as the Child Welfare Act (1960:97), the Care of Young Persons Act and the introduction of social central boards. He was succeeded by Lennart Geijer as minister for justice, in connection with all ministers requesting dismissal on the resignation of Prime Minister Tage Erlander and Olof Palme's accession on 9 October 1969. Kling then served as ambassador and head of the Embassy of Sweden in Copenhagen from 1969 to 1973 and as ambassador in Lisbon from 1973 to 1979.

Kling served as chairman of the Board of Governors (Riksgäldsfullmäktige) of the Swedish National Debt Office from 1952 to 1956, of AB Atomenergi from 1956, as vice chairman of Sveriges allmänna hypoteksbank from 1954 to 1957 and as a member of the Första kammaren from 1962 to 1969.

== Personal life ==
In 1944, Kling married Karin Kropp (born 1919), the daughter of William Kropp and Asta (née Floberg). They had one child: Peter (born 1945).

== Death ==
Kling died on 13 June 1985 in Malmö. He was interred at S:t Pauli northern cemetery in Malmö on 28 June 1985.

Government offices
Preceded by Ingvar Lindell	Minister for Justice; 1959–1969	Succeeded by Lennart Geijer
Diplomatic posts
Preceded by Ragnvald Bagge	Ambassador of Sweden to Denmark; 1969–1973	Succeeded by Hubert de Bèsche
Preceded by Karl Fredrik Almqvist	Ambassador of Sweden to Portugal; 1973–1979	Succeeded by Sven Fredrik Hedin
