= Gunnila Bernadotte =

- Princess Bernadotte; Countess of Wisborg
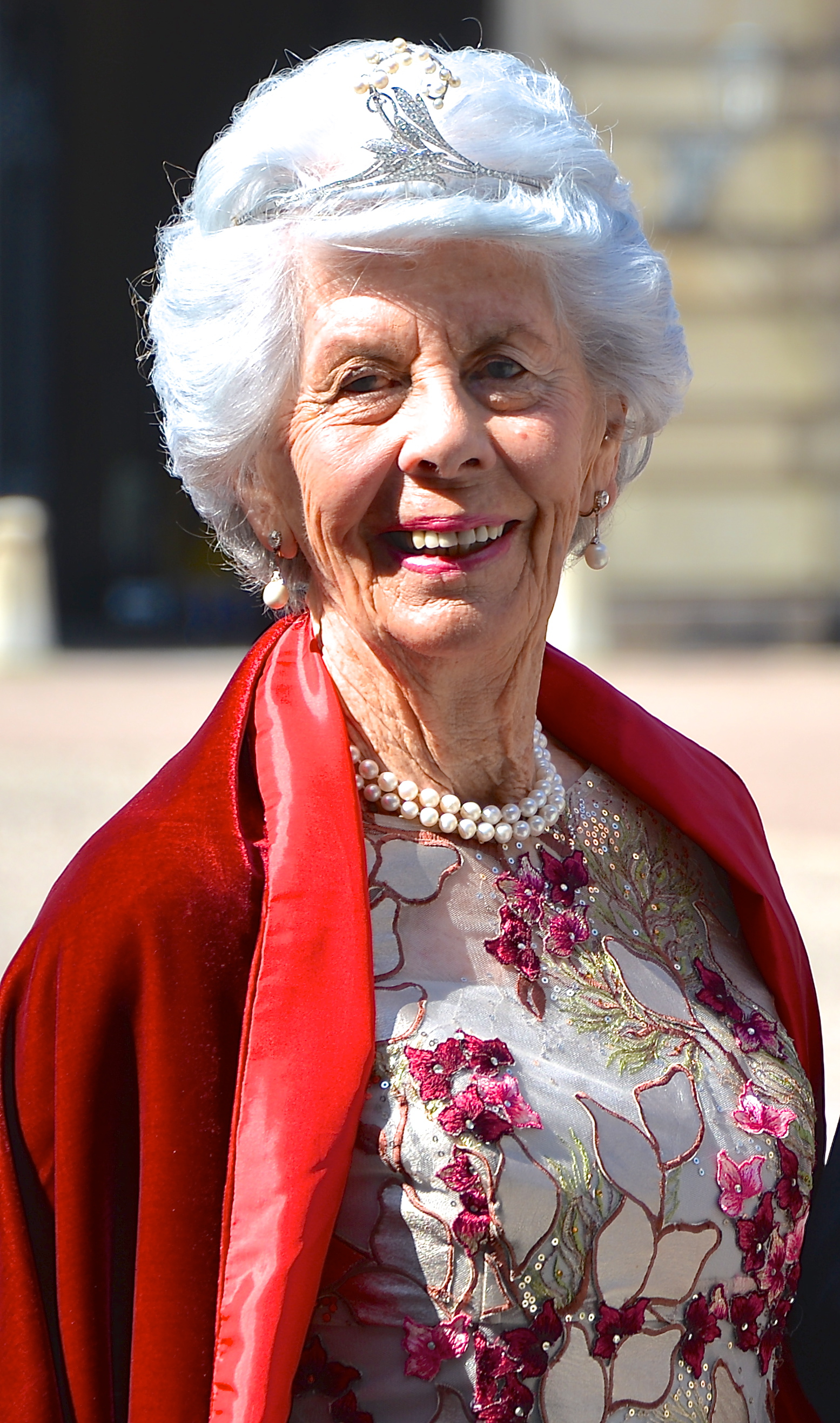
- Countess Gunnila at the wedding of her grandniece Princess Madeleine in 2013
- Born: Countess Gunnila Märta Louise Wachtmeister af Johannishus; 12 May 1923; Stockholm, Sweden
- Died: 12 September 2016 (aged 93); Båstad, Sweden
- Burial: 29 September 2016; Royal Cemetery, Solna, Sweden
- Spouse: Carl-Herman Bussler (m. 1942; died 1981) Prince Carl Johan Bernadotte (m. 1988; died 2012)
- Issue: Louise Bussler; Catharina Bussler; Madeleine Bussler; Carl-Fredrik Bussler
Names
- Gunnila Märta Louise Bernadotte
- Noble family: Wachtmeister af Johannishus
- Father: Count Nils Wachtmeister af Johannishus
- Mother: Märta De Geer af Leufsta

Gunnila Märta Louise, Princess Bernadotte, Countess of Wisborg (née Countess Gunnila Wachtmeister af Johannishus; 12 May 1923 – 12 September 2016) was a Swedish and Luxembourgish noblewoman.

== Early life ==
The daughter of Count Nils Claes Ludvig Wachtmeister af Johannishus (1891–1960) and Baroness Märta Ebba Carolina de Geer af Leufsta (1896–1976).

== First marriage ==
She was first married in 1942 to Carl-Herman Albert Gerhard Bussler (1918–1981), son of Karl-Gerhard Bussler and Countess Catharina Stenbock. The couple had four children together:

- Louise (1943–1986)
- Catharina (1946–1946)
- Madeleine (b. 1948)
- Carl-Fredrik "Fred" (b. 1951)

== Second marriage ==
Following her first husband's death, on 29 September 1988, in Copenhagen she became the second wife of Count Carl Johan Bernadotte of Wisborg, a widower and the youngest son of King Gustaf VI Adolf and Princess Margaret of Connaught. Via her marriage to Bernadotte she became nobility in Luxembourg and was addressed there as Princess Bernadotte and Countess of Wisborg due to titles granted to her husband by Charlotte, Grand Duchess of Luxembourg.

In 2010, Bernadotte gifted her with the house in Båstad, built many years earlier for himself and his first wife, Kerstin Wijkmark. He died in 2012.

== Ancestry ==
Ancestors of Gunnila Bernadotte

8. Count Claes Adam Wachtmeister
4. Count Fredrik Wachtmeister
9. Countess Amalia Regina Wrangel av Sauss
2. Count Nils Wachtmeister
10. Count Carl Fredrik Ludvig af Ugglas
5. Countess Louise af Ugglas
11. Countess Lotten von Düben
1. Gunnila Bernadotte
12. Countess Louise De Geer af Leusta
6. Count Louise De Geer af Leusta
13. Countess Vendla Mariana Johanna Sofia von Wright
3. Countess Märta De Geer af Leufsta
14. Count Claes Edvard Cederström
7. Countess Märtha Cederström
15. Countess Märta Leijonhufvud
