= Carl Wachtmeister =

Carl Wachtmeister may refer to:

- Carl Wachtmeister (politician) (1823–1871), Swedish politician
- Carl Alarik Wachtmeister (1865–1925), Swedish vice admiral
- Carl Johan Wachtmeister (1903–1993), Swedish fencer
- Carl Wachtmeister (footballer) (born 1989), Swedish footballer
