= List of ambassadors of Sweden to Portugal =

Ambassador of Sweden to Portugal
- Lesser coat of arms of the Kingdom of Sweden

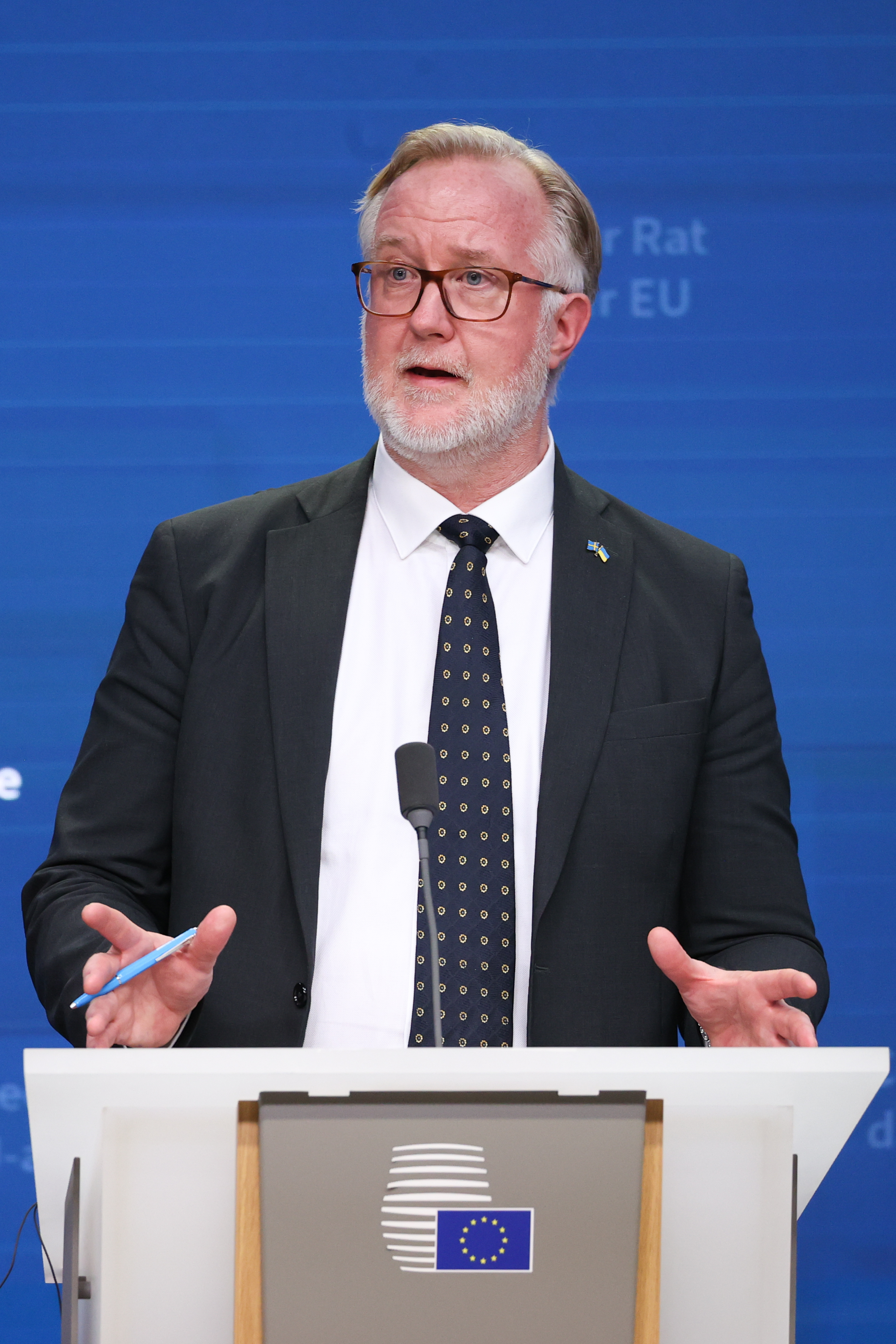
- Incumbent; Johan Pehrson since August 2026
- Ministry for Foreign Affairs; Swedish Embassy, Lisbon
- Style: His or Her Excellency (formal); Mr. or Madam Ambassador (informal)
- Reports to: Minister for Foreign Affairs
- Seat: Lisbon, Portugal
- Appointer: Government of Sweden
- Term length: No fixed term
- Website: Swedish Embassy, Lisbon

The Ambassador of Sweden to Portugal (known formally as the Ambassador of the Kingdom of Sweden to the Portuguese Republic) is the official representative of the government of Sweden to the president of Portugal and government of Portugal.

== History ==
Between 1900 and 1937, the Swedish minister in Madrid, Spain, was accredited to Lisbon.

The events surrounding the Spanish Civil War led, in 1937, to a mid-level official being sent to Lisbon as chargé d'affaires ad interim. After the war broke out, given the situation in Europe and Sweden's commercial and other interests, it became important to appoint an envoy to Portugal. For the time being, this was arranged by reallocating the funds that had been set aside for the envoy post in Riga to instead cover an envoy in Lisbon. In 1946, the Swedish parliament approved the government’s proposal to make the position permanent in Lisbon.

In January 1951, it was reported that the minister position in Lisbon, would be abolished. After this, Sweden's diplomatic mission in Portugal was to be headed by a chargé d'affaires rather than a full ambassador. The Swedish envoy in Madrid was to extend their duties to cover Portugal. Although the Foreign Minister supported this change, some members of the Committee of Supply, particularly from the right and liberal parties, opposed it, advocating to retain the position for at least another year. However, the committee ultimately approved the abolition of the post. The Portuguese refused to accept this arrangement. The Foreign Minister resolved the issue by appointing a chargé d'affaires en pied to replace the minister, ensuring the position remained filled at a lower diplomatic rank. In July 1953, a Swedish envoy was once again appointed in Lisbon, reinstating the higher diplomatic position after the earlier changes.

In 1959, an agreement was reached between the Swedish and Portuguese governments on the mutual elevation of the respective countries' legations to embassies. The diplomatic rank was thereafter changed to ambassador instead of envoy extraordinary and minister plenipotentiary.

The Swedish ambassador in Lisbon has, during various periods, also been accredited to other countries: between 1958 and 1961, the Swedish ambassador was also accredited to Monrovia, Liberia; between 1979 and 1994, to Bissau, Guinea-Bissau, and Praia, Cape Verde; and since 2008, to São Tomé, São Tomé and Príncipe. After the Swedish embassy in Dakar, Senegal was closed in 2010, responsibility for Cape Verde and Guinea-Bissau was transferred back to the ambassador in Lisbon.

== List of representatives ==
Name	Period	Title	Resident / Concurrent accreditation	Notes	Presented credentials	Ref
Kingdom of Portugal (–1910)
Christoffer Henrik von Vegesack	15 April 1663 – 6 November 1669	Resident		Also consul		
Carl Gustaf Oxenstierna	1792–1797	Envoy				
Gotthard Mauritz von Rehausen	1797–1801	Chargé d'affaires				
Gotthard Mauritz von Rehausen	1801–1805	Minister				
Johan Albert Kantzow	1806–1807	Chargé d'affaires				
Carl Adolf de Kantzow	16 January 1823 – 29 May 1860	Chargé d'affaires and consul general				
Johan Fredrik Sebastian Crusenstolpe	29 May 1860 – 1866	Chargé d'affaires		Also consul general 20 October 1860.		
Johan Fredrik Sebastian Crusenstolpe	11 December 1866 – 23 July 1882	Resident minister		Died in office (during visit in Stockholm).		
Otto Steenbock	1883–1890	Resident minister and consul general				
Axel August Cronhielm	16 October 1890 – 1896	Chargé d'affaires ad interim and consul general				
Axel August Cronhielm	7 December 1896 – 1900	Chargé d'affaires		Also consul general 4 December 1896.		
Ove Gude	1900–1902	Envoy	Resident in Madrid			
Fritz Wedel Jarlsberg	1902–1905	Envoy	Resident in Madrid			
Robert Sager	1905–1907	Envoy	Resident in Madrid			
Carl Haraldsson Strömfelt	1907–1910	Envoy	Resident in Madrid			
First Portuguese Republic (1910–1926)
Carl Haraldsson Strömfelt	1910–1913	Envoy	Resident in Madrid			
Gustaf Falkenberg	28 November 1913 – 26 August 1917	Envoy	Resident in Madrid	Died in office		
Augustin Beck-Friis	4 December 1917 – 1920	Envoy extraordinary and minister plenipotentiary	Resident in Madrid			
Ivan Danielsson	1921–1922	Envoy	Resident in Madrid			
Wollmar Boström	1922–1925	Envoy	Resident in Madrid			
Ivan Danielsson	1925–1926	Envoy	Resident in Madrid		19 May 1926	
Ditadura Nacional (1926–1933)
Ivan Danielsson	1926–1933	Envoy	Resident in Madrid		19 May 1926	
Second Portuguese Republic/Estado Novo (1933–1974)
Ivan Danielsson	1933–1937	Envoy	Resident in Madrid			
Lennart Rappe	1937–1938	Chargé d'affaires ad interim (Note: With the diplomatic rank of first legation secretary.)				
Leif Öhrvall	1938–1941	Chargé d'affaires ad interim				
Johan Beck-Friis	24 December 1940 – 1943	Envoy	Also accredited to the Norwegian government-in-exile in London		15 February 1941	
Gustaf Weidel	1943–1951	Envoy				
Sten Sundström	? – 30 June 1951	Chargé d'affaires ad interim				
Jan Stenström	7 July 1951 – July 1953	Chargé d'affaires en pied (Note: One source claims that Stenström served as chargé d'affaires ad interim. Another source claims that he served as chargé d'affaires. However, it is more plausible—supported by a Svenska Dagbladet article from 28 June 1951—that the head of mission held the title of chargé d'affaires en pied. This seems most likely, as no envoy from another country was concurrently accredited to Lisbon during this period.)				
Jan Stenström	July 1953 – 1955	Envoy				
Lars von Celsing	1953–1954	Charge d'affaires ad interim				
Knut Richard Thyberg	1955–1959	Envoy	Also accredited to Monrovia 1958–1959			
Knut Richard Thyberg	1959 – 1 November 1959	Ambassador	Also accredited to Monrovia			
Alexis Aminoff	1 November 1959 – 1963	Ambassador	Also accredited to Monrovia 1959–1961			
Gunnar Dryselius	1964–1970	Ambassador				
Karl Fredrik Almqvist	1970–1972	Ambassador				
Herman Kling	1973–1974	Ambassador				
Third Portuguese Republic (1974–present)
Herman Kling	1974–1979	Ambassador				
Sven Fredrik Hedin	1979–1986	Ambassador	Also accredited to Bissau and Praia (both from 1980 (Note: Sveriges statskalender (1986) states the year 1980 while the 1993 edition of Vem är det (1992) states the year 1979.))			
Lennart Rydfors	1986–1988	Ambassador	Also accredited to Bissau and Praia			
Göran Hasselmark	1989–1994	Ambassador	Also accredited to Bissau and Praia			
Kerstin Asp-Johnsson	1994–1997	Ambassador				
Krister Isaksson	1997–2001	Ambassador				
Gunilla Olofsson	2001–2005	Ambassador				
Gabriella Lindholm	2005–2008	Ambassador				
Bengt Lundborg	2008–2012	Ambassador	Also accredited to Praia and São Tomé			
Caroline Fleetwood	2012–2017	Ambassador	Also accredited to Bissau		14 January 2013.	
Helena Pilsas Ahlin	2017–2022	Ambassador	Also accredited to Bissau and Praia		16 November 2017	
Elisabeth Eklund	2022–2026	Ambassador	Also accredited to Bissau and São Tomé		25 August 2022	
Johan Pehrson	August 2026 – present	Ambassador		Political appointee (non-career diplomat)		

== See also ==
- Portugal–Sweden relations
