= Ted Wachtmeister =

Swedish rower

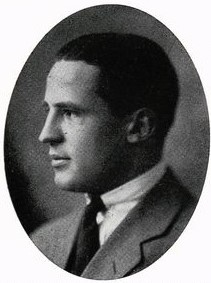
Schering "Ted" Wachtmeister

Count Erik Melcher Schering "Ted" Wachtmeister (14 July 1892 – 18 December 1975) was a Swedish jurist, reserve officer and rower who competed in the 1912 Summer Olympics.

== Career ==
Wachtmeister was born at Tistad Castle, in Nyköping Municipality, Sweden, the son of son Chancellor, Count Fredrik Wachtmeister and Baroness Louise af Ugglas. He passed studentexamen at Lundsbergs boarding school in 1911 and received a Candidate of Law degree from Uppsala University in 1918. Wachtmeister served as an attaché at the Ministry for Foreign Affairs from 1918 to 1922. He became a reserve officer in 1915 and was commissioned as a fänrik in the reserve of the Crown Prince's Hussar Regiment (K 7) the same year 1915. He was promoted to underlöjtnant in 1918, to lieutenant in 1923, and then served as ryttmästare in the cavalry reserve from 1942 to 1959.

Wachtmeister competed in the 1912 Summer Olympics as a rower. He was a member of the Swedish boat Roddklubben af 1912 which was eliminated in the quarter-finals of the men's eight tournament.

Wachtmeister was chairman of the board of Jönåkers häradsallmänning from 1933, Södermanlands läns brandförsäkringsbolag from 1946 to 1963, Skandinaviska Banken's branch office in Nyköping from 1954 to 1963 and held various municipal assignments until 1951.

== Personal life ==
He owned and lived in Nääs manor.

Wachtmeister married for the first time in 1920 to Margaretha Huitfeldt (1900–1926), the daughter of commander Hugo Huitfeldt and Signe Stang. He married a second time in 1929 to Adrienne De Geer (1908–1996), the daughter of major Wilhelm De Geer and Thomasine Funck. In the first marriage, he was the father of Bengt (1921–2006) and Nils (1923–2003), and in the second of Thomas ("Tom") (1931–2011), Ian (1932–2017), Georg (born 1940) and Sten (born 1945).

== Awards ==
- Knight of the Order of Vasa (1954)
- Knight of the Order of Civil Merit
