= HSwMS Wachtmeister =

Several ships of the Swedish Navy have been named HSwMS Wachtmeister, named after the Swedish noble family of Wachtmeister:

- Wachtmeister (1681) was a ship launched in 1681 and lost in battle in 1719
- HSwMS Wachtmeister (10) was a Wrangel-class destroyer launched in 1917 and decommissioned in 1947
