= Hubert de Bèsche =

Swedish civil servant and diplomat

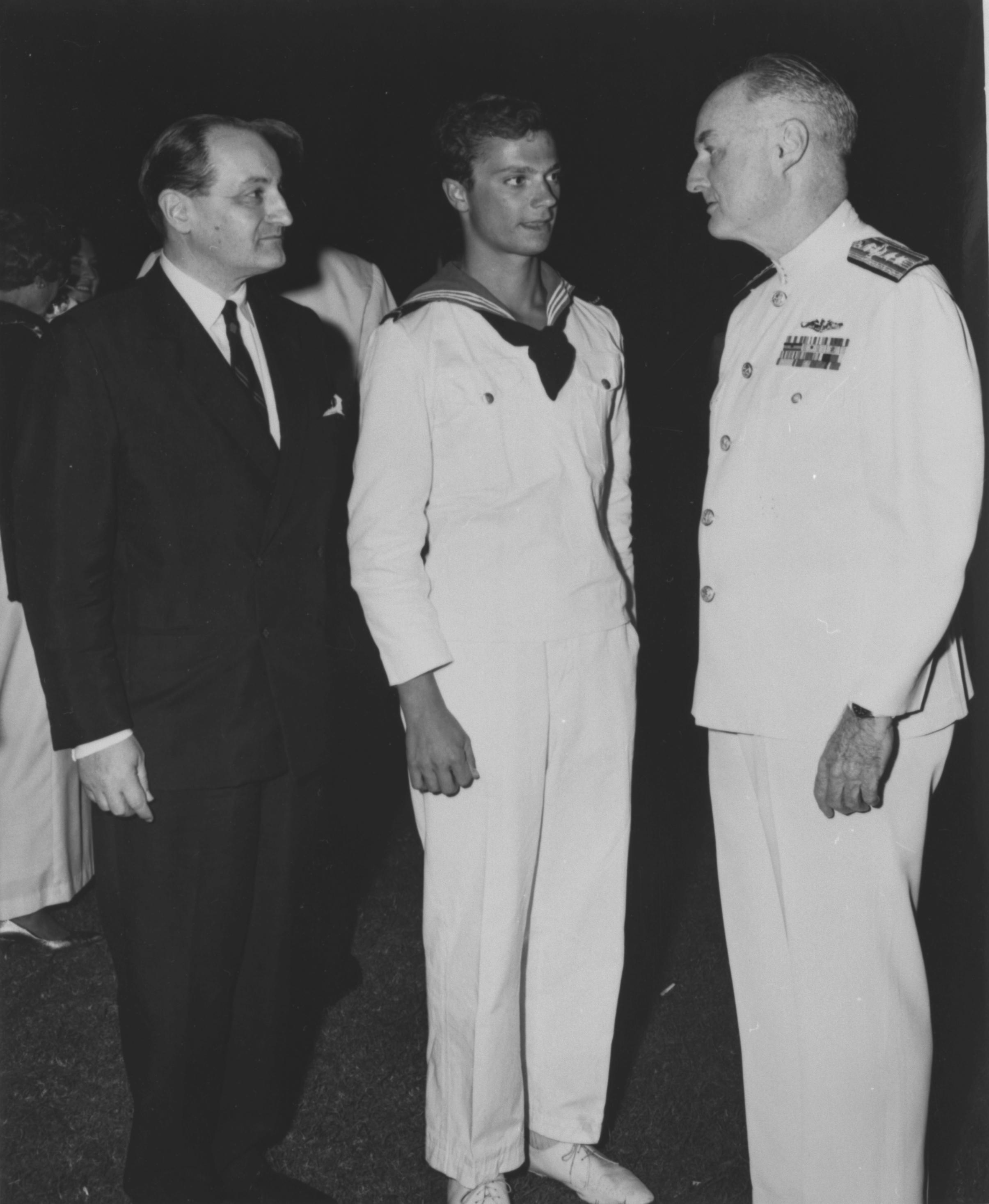
- de Bèsche (left), Crown Prince Carl Gustaf (middle) and an American rear admiral (right) in Hawaii in 1967
- Born: Hubert Wathier August de Bèsche; 7 July 1911; Frösö, Sweden
- Died: 11 March 1997 (aged 85); Stockholm, Sweden
- Occupation: Diplomat
- Years active: 1936–1977
- Spouse: Eva Rhedin (m. 1946; died 1981)
- Children: 2
- Relatives: Leif Öhrvall (co-father-in-law)

Hubert Wathier August de Bèsche (7 July 1911 – 11 March 1997) was a Swedish civil servant and diplomat. He served as the Ambassador of Sweden to the United States from 1964 to 1973 and to Denmark 1973 to 1977.

== Early life ==
de Bèsche was born on 7 July 1911 in Frösö, Jämtland County, Sweden, the son of Lieutenant Colonel Hubert de Bèsche and his wife Ebba Fröberg. He passed studentexamen in Stockholm in 1929 and received a Candidate of Law degree in 1935.

== Career ==
de Bèsche became and attaché at the Ministry for Foreign Affairs in Stockholm in 1936. He served in London in 1937, at the Foreign Ministry in 1940, as second secretary in 1941, and as first secretary in 1944. He was the director of the trade commission from 1947 to 1949, trade counselor in Washington, D.C. from 1952 to 1953 (acting from 1949), director general (utrikesråd) and head of the trade department at the Foreign Ministry from 1953 to 1956, deputy state secretary for foreign affairs from 1956 to 1963, ambassador to Washington, D.C. from 1964 to 1973, and ambassador to Copenhagen from 1973 to 1977.

ee Bèsche was the secretary of the Swedish-British-American Government Commission from 1943 to 1945, participated in trade negotiations with England and the United States from 1943 to 1946, and in negotiations with the European Coal Organization in 1946. He was part of the delegation at the Annecy Round in 1949 and the International Materials Conference in Washington, D.C. from 1951 to 1953. He was the chairman of trade negotiations with Finland in 1954, Spain from 1954 to 1955, and the United Kingdom from 1954 to 1955. He also took part in the International Wheat Agreement in 1955, the General Agreement on Tariffs and Trade (GATT) from 1955 to 1957, and was a member of the trade board of the Organisation for European Economic Co-operation (OEEC) from 1956 to 1960. He served as vice chairman of the delegation for free trade area negotiations from 1956 to 1958, chairman of negotiations at the European Free Trade Association (EFTA) in 1959, and participated in European integration negotiations from 1960 to 1961.

== Personal life ==
In 1946, de Bèsche married Eva Rhedin (1918–1981), the daughter of Major Carl Rhedin and Dagmar (née Bäcklin). They had two children: Caroline (born 1947), and Gunilla (born 1949).

Through his daughter Gunilla’s marriage to Jan Öhrvall, de Bèsche became co-father-in-law to Ambassador Leif Öhrvall.

de Bèsche was a foil and sabre fencer. He competed in three events at the 1936 Summer Olympics.

== Death ==
de Bèsche died on 11 March 1997 in Stockholm. The funeral took place on 9 April 1997, at Djurgården Church in Djurgården, Stockholm. He was interred in his wife grave at Helgesta Cemetery in Helgesta, Flen Municipality, Södermanland County.

== Awards and decorations ==
=== Swedish ===
- (Sweden) Commander Grand Cross of the Order of the Polar Star (3 December 1974)
- (Sweden) Commander 1st Class of the Order of the Polar Star

=== Foreign ===
- (Denmark) Commander 1st Class of the Order of the Dannebrog
- Commander 1st Class of the Order of the White Rose of Finland
- (Finland) Grand Knight's Cross with Star of the Order of the Falcon
- (Netherlands) Grand Officer of the Order of Orange-Nassau
- Grand Officer of the Order of the Sun of Peru
- (United Kingdom) Honorary Knight Commander of the Royal Victorian Order (June 1956)
- (United Kingdom) Commander of the Order of the British Empire
- (Pahlavi dynasty) Grand Cross of the Order of Homayoun
- (Norway) Commander of the Order of St. Olav with Star (1959)
- (Austria) Grand Decoration of Honour in Silver with Star (1958)
- (United Kingdom) British Commemorative Medal

== Honours ==
- Honorary Doctorate of Law, Upsala College, USA (1968)

Civic offices
Preceded by Leif Belfrage	Deputy State Secretary for Foreign Affairs; 1956–1963	Succeeded by Nils Montan
Diplomatic posts
Preceded by Gunnar Jarring	Ambassador of Sweden to the United States; 1964–1973	Succeeded by Wilhelm Wachtmeister
Preceded by Herman Kling	Ambassador of Sweden to Denmark; 1973–1977	Succeeded by Tord Hagen
