= Tistad Castle =

Coordinates: 58°49′31″N 16°53′28″E

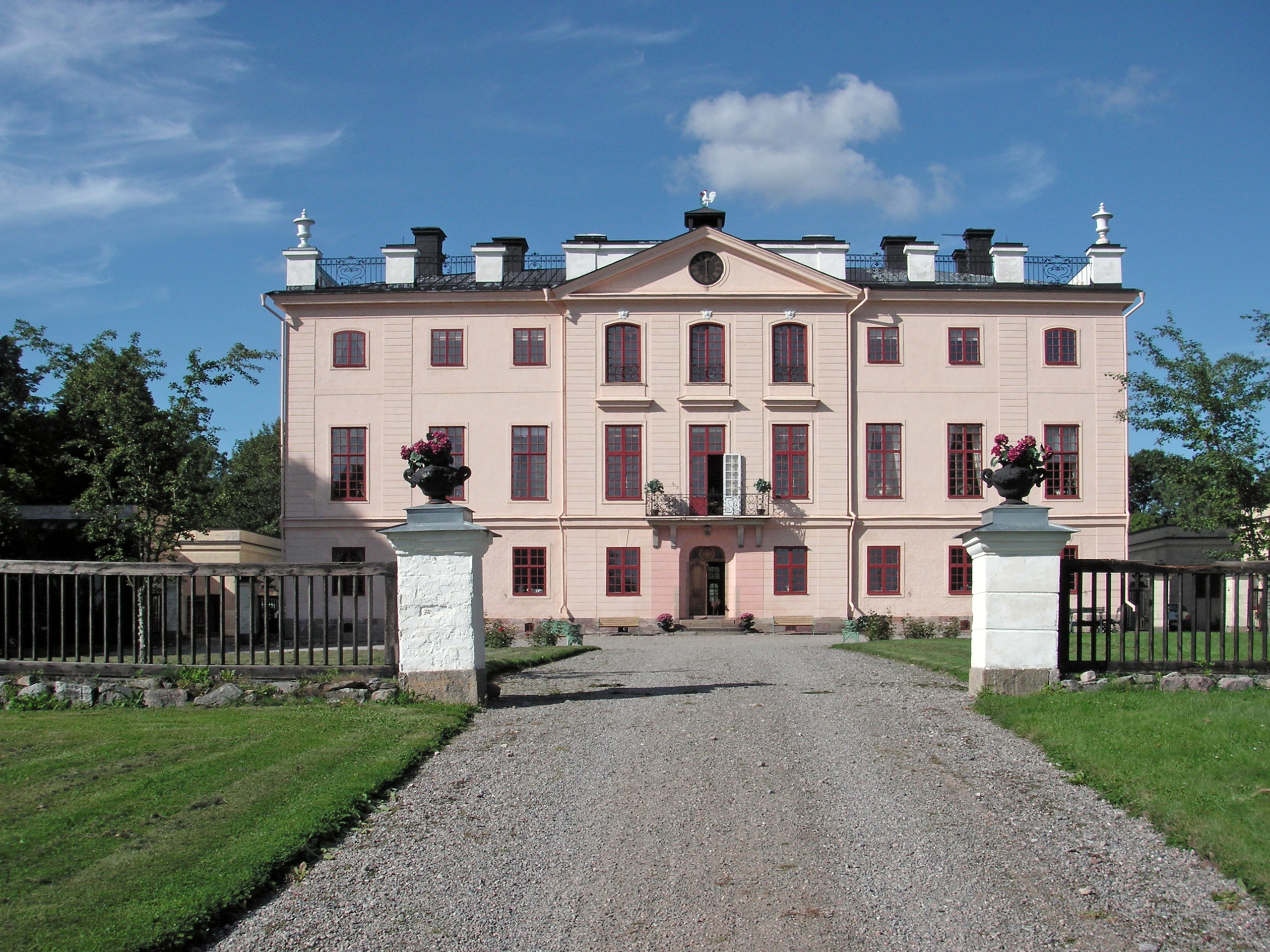
- Interactive map of the Tistad Castle area

General information
- Type: Castle
- Architectural style: Neoclassical
- Location: Nyköping Municipality, Södermanland County, Sweden
- Owner: Wachtmeister af Johannishus

Tistad Castle is a castle in Sweden.

== See also ==
- List of castles in Sweden
