= Baltzar von Platen (1804–1875) =

Swedish noble, politician and naval officer (1804–1875)

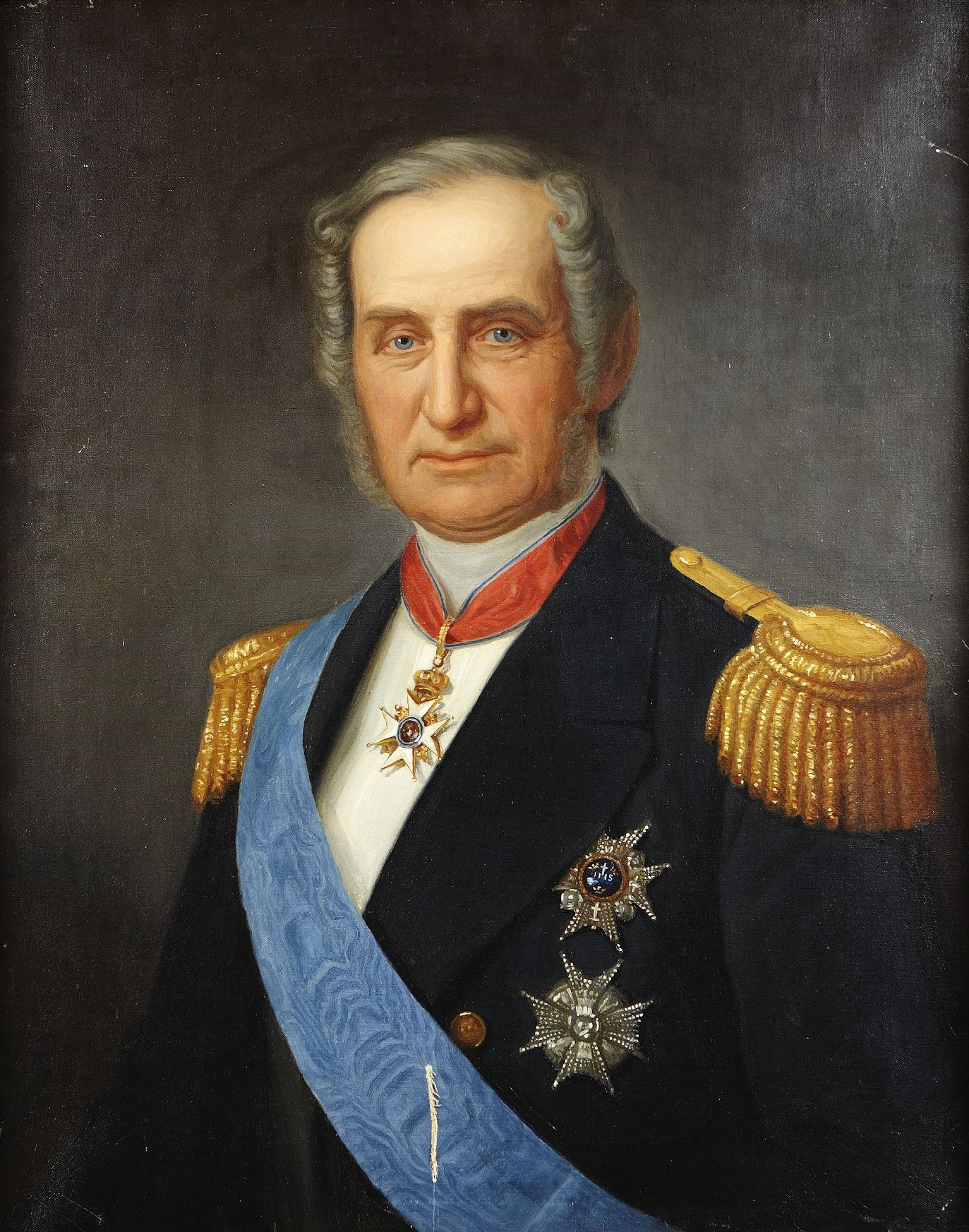

Minister for Naval Affairs
- In office 1849 to 1852, 1862 to 1868

Foreign minister of the United Kingdoms of Sweden and Norway
- In office 1871–1872
- Preceded by: Carl Wachtmeister

Personal details
- Born: Baltzar Julius Ernst von Platen; 16 April 1804 Frugården, Skaraborg County
- Died: 20 March 1875 (aged 70) Jakob and Johannes parish
- Parent: Baltzar Bogislaus von Platen (father)

Baltzar Julius Ernst von Platen (1804–1875) was a Swedish noble, naval officer, politician and diplomat. He served as minister for naval affairs for two terms between 1849 and 1852 and between 1862 and 1868 as well as foreign minister of the United Kingdoms of Sweden and Norway for one year between 1871 and 1872.

== Biography ==
Being the son of navy officer Baltzar Bogislaus von Platen he was born 16 April 1804 in Frugården in Skaraborg County. At a young age he learned the basics of seamanship by serving several years on a Swedish merchant vessel. He was enrolled in the Swedish Navy at 17 years of age and was trained another during another four years of sailing on Swedish merchant vessels and in British Naval service. After his return to home in 1825, he was employed as aide to his father and then at the office of the general adjutant of the Swedish Navy. In 1830 he was promoted to first lieutenant. Following a conflict with his superiors he resigned from the navy in 1838 without having been promoted further.

Next, he occupied himself with various business ventures and politics. He was involved in the Göta Canal Company (where his father had had a leading role) and Motala Verkstad. He was active as a member of the liberal opposition, took active part in the 1840–1841 session of the Riksdag of the Estates, and advocated a continuation of his father's plans regarding the naval defence of Sweden.

King Oscar I named him one of his cabinet chamberlains in 1844. In April 1849 he was appointed minister for naval affairs and promoted to captain. At the 1850 parliament he presented detailed plans for a complete overhaul of the navy, whereby the ships of the line would be abolished and the Archipelago Fleet would make up the bulk of the navy's strength. This proposal was met with much resistance from the leading navy officers and did not pass through parliament. von Platen therefore resigned from his ministerial post in January 1852.

He was Swedish-Norwegian envoy in London from October 1857 to August 1861. In July 1862 he was again appointed minister for naval affairs and promoted to rear admiral. In 1866 he was able to carry out his plans to divide the navy into the Main Fleet (based in Karlskrona) and the Archipelago Artillery (based in Stockholm and Gothenburg). However, his plans were met with the continued resistance, and the problems associated with procurement of equipment in an era of many naval inventions and quick developments led him to resign again in June 1868.

Following the unexpected death of Carl Wachtmeister, von Platen again entered the government, this time as prime minister for foreign affairs, the title used for the foreign minister at that time. When king Charles XV died and was succeeded by Oscar II on the throne in 1872, von Platen knew that the new king disagreed with his naval reforms of 1866 and that the Archipelago Artillery would soon be abolished which indeed happened in 1873. von Platen, therefore, resigned in December 1872.

His health had started to decline at this point and he soon withdrew from public life. In 1873 he resigned from the First Chamber of the Parliament, to which he had been elected by Uppsala County Council in 1866.

== Family ==
Platen married Charlotte De Geer (1813–1888) in 1832. She was the only child of count Carl De Geer (1781–1861), who was one of the richest men in Sweden at that time. This wealth allowed Platen to be a patron and to donate considerable amounts to charity.

== Honours ==
von Platen was made a member of the Royal Swedish Academy of Agriculture in 1843 and honorary member in 1852, a member of the Royal Swedish Academy of War Sciences in 1849, an honorary member of the Royal Swedish Society of Naval Sciences in 1849, member of the Royal Swedish Academy of Sciences in 1854, an honorary member of the Royal Society of Sciences in Uppsala in 1856, and an honorary member of the Royal Swedish Academy of Fine Arts in 1856. He was made an honorary doctor of laws at University of Oxford in 1860.
