= Gustaf Adlerfelt =

Swedish writer

Gustaf Adlerfelt (1671 – June 28, 1709) was a Swedish historical writer born near Stockholm, brother of Pehr Adlerfelt.

He was appointed by Charles XII "gentleman of the court" and afterwards accompanied him to his military campaigns, and writing a journal on them. He continues this work until his death in 1709 when he was killed by a cannonball in the Battle of Poltava.
