= ASmallWorld =

Swiss social network

ASMALLWORLD AG
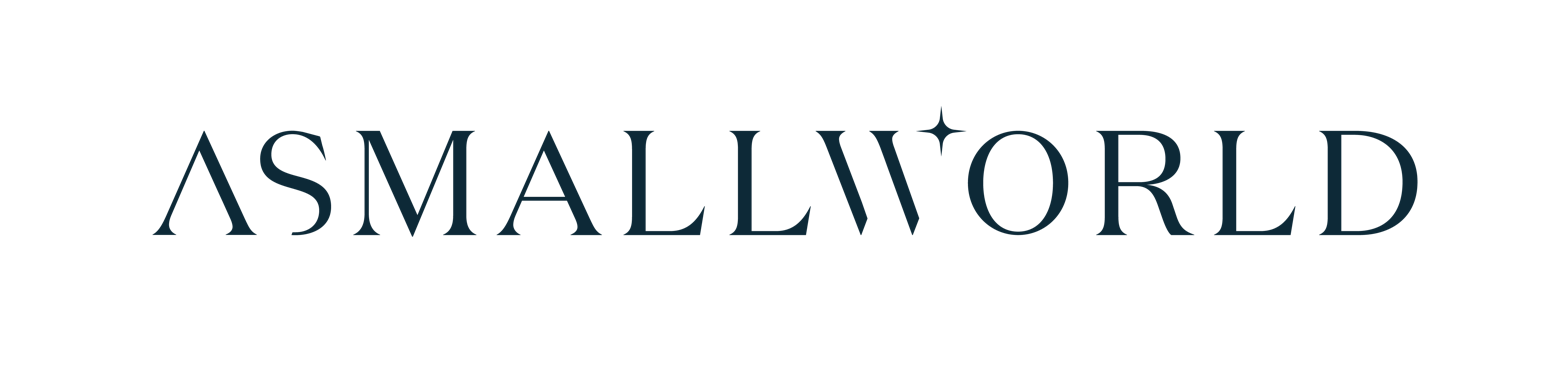

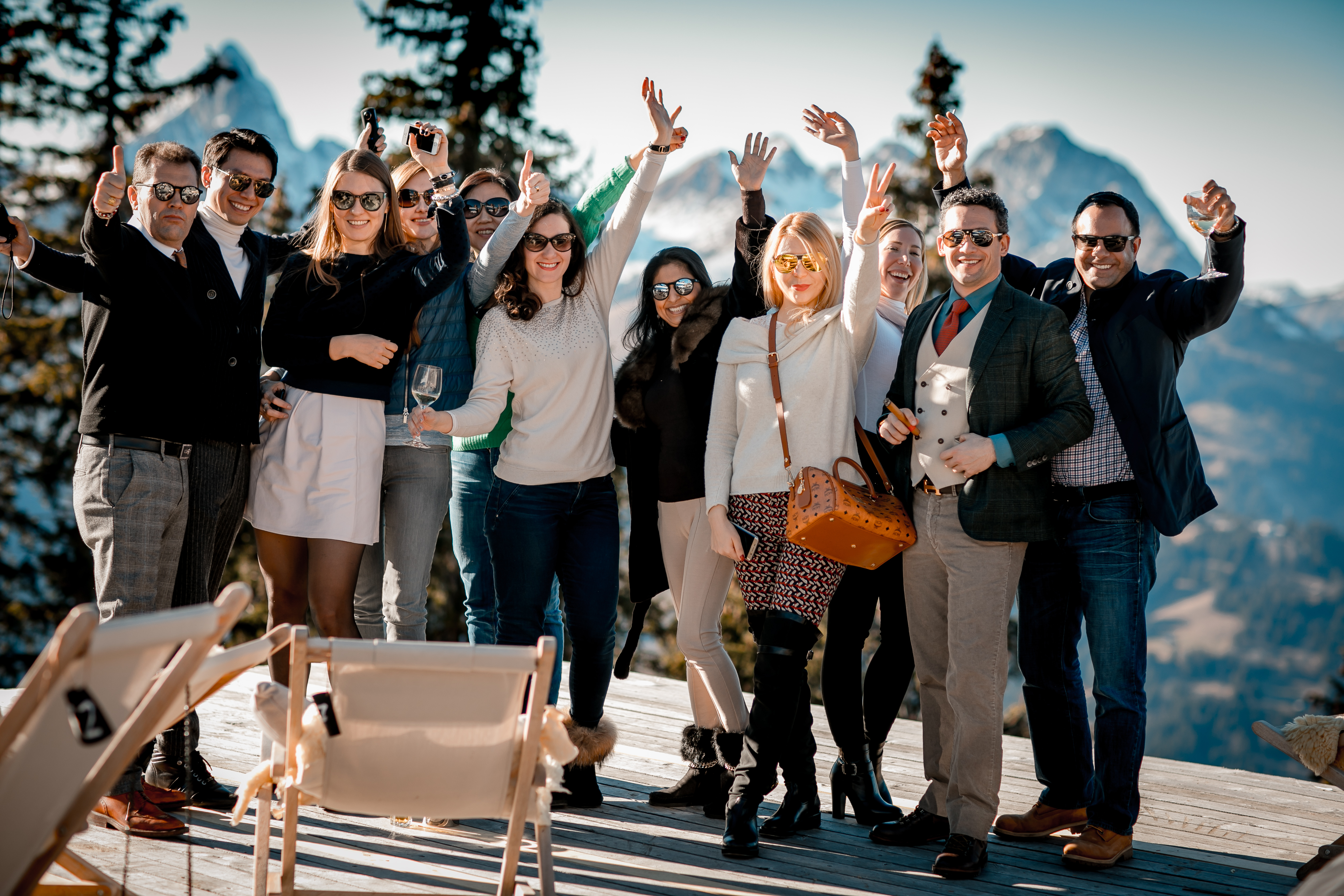
- Company type: Public company
- Traded as: SIX: ASWN
- Country of origin: Switzerland
- Owner: Patrick Liotard-Vogt (64%); Alexander König (9%); Hansainvest (7%); Global Hotel Alliance (3%)
- Founder: Erik Wachtmeister; Louise Wachtmeister
- Chairperson: Michael Manz
- CEO: Zain Richardson
- Industry: Social networking service
- Revenue: CHF 20.9 million (2024)
- Total equity: CHF 11 million shares
- Subsidiaries: Bespoke Travel; ASMALLWORLD Hospitality; ASMALLWORLD DISCOVERY; First Class & More; The World's Finest Clubs
- Website: www.asmallworld.com
- Launched: March 2004; 22 years ago

ASMALLWORLD (stylized as ASW) operates a digital travel & luxury lifestyle eco-system based in Zürich, Switzerland, that encourages its members to find inspiration, book unique journeys, and connect with like-minded members such as Lynn Forester de Rothschild, Prince Pavlos of Greece, Will Astor, Tim Jeffries, Will Carling, Eric Fellner and Jeffrey Epstein.

The social network has a membership subscription business model; offering four different tiers: Free, Premium, Prestige and Signature.

Annually, in mid-December, over 200 members attend the Winter Weekend at a luxury hotel in a prominent Swiss ski resort (formerly the Gstaad Palace in Gstaad, Switzerland) where members can join in skiing, wine tastings, dinners, and black tie receptions.

== History ==
In March 2004, Erik and Louise Wachtmeister founded ASMALLWORLD. It was dubbed "MySpace for millionaires" by The Wall Street Journal. To maintain its desired exclusivity, ASMALLWORLD, while initially free, was invitation-only, open only to those invited by an existing member. In October 2004, the platform had 30,000 users, mostly celebrities, models and bankers between 25 and 35 years old, living in Europe or North America. By August 2005, the platform had 68,000 members.

In May 2006, Harvey Weinstein's The Weinstein Company acquired a majority stake in the platform. Other investors included former AOL COO Robert W. Pittman, film director Renny Harlin, and entrepreneur Prince Alexander von Fürstenberg. At the time, ASMALLWORLD had approximately 130,000 members. Harvey Weinstein said his company planned to expand the site's membership and bring in additional advertisers. It was the Weinstein Company's first investment in an Internet company. After launching online advertising in 2006, the website had 100 partners. Advertisers included Jaguar Cars, Diane von Furstenberg, Mercedes-Benz, Cartier, and Moet & Chandon.

In October 2009, Patrick Liotard-Vogt, a Nestlé heir and Swiss investor, purchased a controlling stake in the company, and became its chairman. Sabine Heller became chief executive officer. At that time, membership was in excess of 500,000 members.

In July 2012, the company launched a mobile app for iOS. A mobile app for Android followed.

In February 2013, ASMALLWORLD announced that as of March 1, 2013, it would not be accepting new members, citing an initiative to ensure the integrity of the community. The company changed its strategy to focus on a smaller network and more perks for its members. After temporarily shutting down, ASMALLWORLD relaunched in May 2013 with a membership model and an advertising-free experience for its members.

In March 2013, it acquired The World's Finest Club, which offers exclusive access to clubs worldwide.

In April 2013, the company purged many members from its rolls, reducing its user base from 850,000 to 250,000 members.

On March 20, 2018, ASMALLWORLD AG became a public company via an initial public offering on the SIX Swiss Exchange, raising CHF 18 million.

In September 2018, the company acquired First Class & More International. In February 2019, the company acquired a UK-based travel agency LuxuryBared and integrated into the ASW app and website, after having invested heavily into technology and team. In March 2019, ASW Hospitality became the property manager for the North Island, a Luxury Collection Resort, Seychelles, a Marriott International-branded hotel. Dario Bertucci was named managing director of ASW Hospitality.

== See also ==
- List of social networking websites
