= Bussler =

Bussler is a German surname. Notable people with the surname include:

- Ludwig Bussler (1838–1900), German musical instructor, critic and conductor
- Patrick Bussler (born 1984), German snowboarder
