= Embassy of Sweden, Copenhagen =

- Location: Copenhagen
- Address: Amaliegade 5A; 1256 Copenhagen K Danmark
- Coordinates: 55.68246°N 12.59171°E
- Ambassador: Hans Wallmark
- Jurisdiction: Denmark
- Website: Official website

The Embassy of Sweden in Copenhagen is Sweden's diplomatic mission in Denmark. It's located on Amaliegade 5A, close to Amalienborg. The embassy is tasked with representing Sweden and the Swedish government in Denmark and promoting Sweden's interests.

== History ==
The formal diplomatic relations between Denmark and Sweden were created when King Christian IV appointed the nobleman Peder Galt (1584–1644) as his envoy to Gustav II Adolph's court in Stockholm. Peder Galt presented the credentials to the Swedish king on 8 April 1622.

From at least 1914 to 1918 the Swedish legation was located at Stavangergade 6, Indre By. From 1919 to 1921, the legation was located at Kalvebod Brygge 4 in the Vesterbro district. In 1921, it moved to Sankt Annæ Plads 15 where the ambassador residence has existed since then and where the chancery was located between 1921 and 2018. In 2018, the chancery moved around the corner to Amaliegade 5A.

During the night of 18 June 1944, a bombing occurred near the Swedish legation as part of Schalburgtage when the Domus Medica hotel at Amaliegade 5 was attacked.

In September 1947, the Swedish legation was upgraded to an embassy and envoy Gustaf von Dardel thereby became ambassador to the Danish court.

== Staff and tasks ==
=== Staff ===
In 2022, the staff at the embassy included an Ambassador who represents Sweden and oversees the embassy's operations. The Minister Counsellor assists with high-level diplomatic functions and policy issues, while the Counsellor focuses on specific areas of diplomatic and consular work. The Social Secretary and Consular Officer manages social and consular services, including support for Swedish citizens. The Communications Manager handles public relations, media, and internal communications, and the Desk Officer manages administrative tasks and supports various functions within the embassy. Additionally, an Accountant is responsible for financial management and accounting, and a Driver and Caretaker provides transportation and maintenance services for the embassy.

=== Tasks ===
The Swedish embassy in Copenhagen is tasked with representing Sweden and the Swedish government in Denmark and promoting Sweden's interests. Sweden has seven honorary consulates in Denmark and two honorary consulates general in the Faroe Islands and Greenland.

== Buildings ==
=== Amaliegade 5A (chancery) ===
On 18 September 2018, the chancery opened at Amaliegade 5A after previously being located at Sankt Annæ Plads 15B.

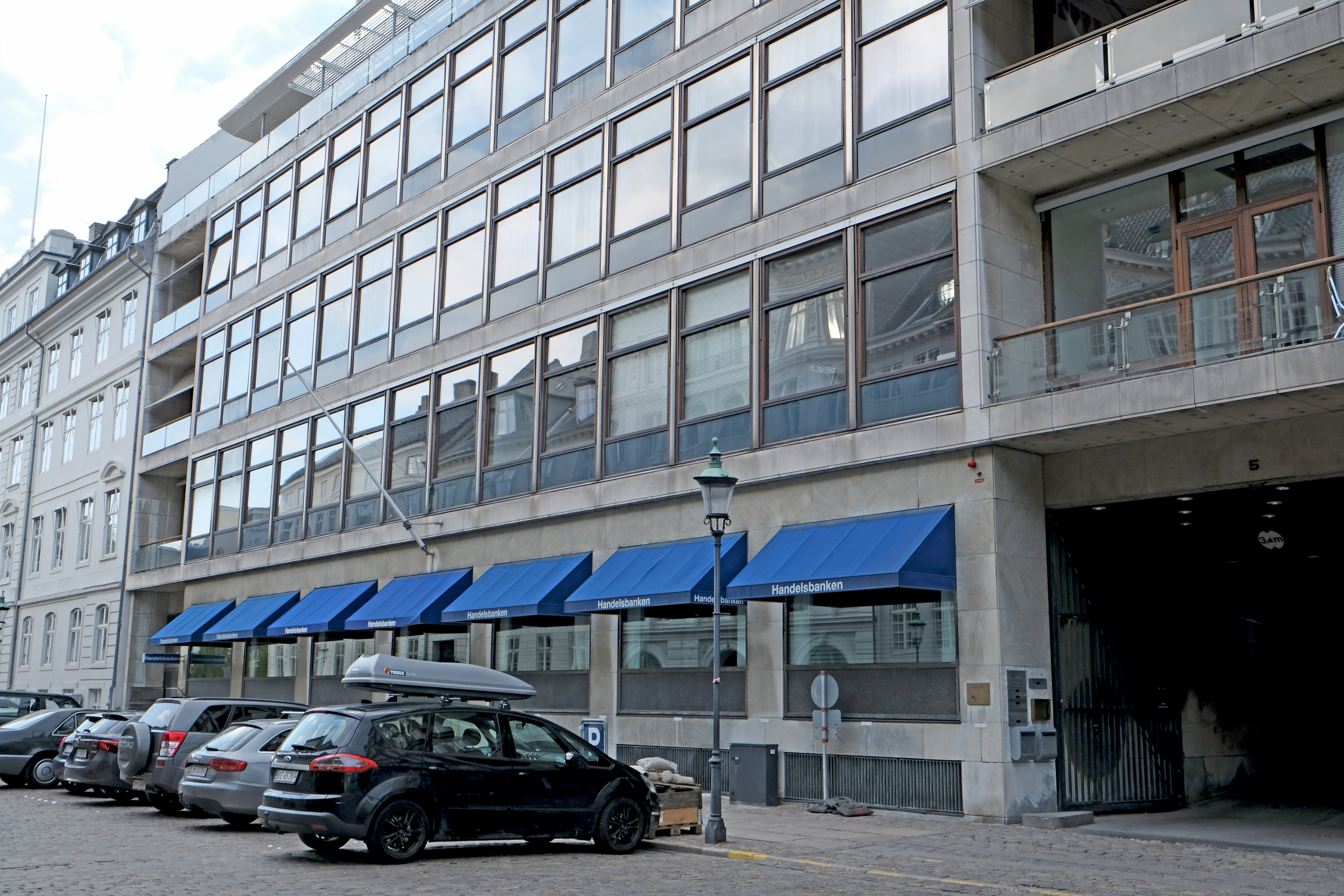
Exterior

=== Sankt Annæ Plads 15 (residence) ===
The Swedish ambassador's residence is today located in a corner house between Sankt Annæ Plads 15A and Amaliegade in Frederiksstaden. It was built in 1750 according to master builder Nicolai Eigtved's drawings on behalf of timber merchant Johan Jegind. The first known owner was Count Conrad Danneskiold-Laurvig, relative "on the side" of King Frederick III, he became the owner of the house in 1755. The next owner was Count Otto Manderup Rantzau. The chancery building at Sankt Annæ Plads 15B was built in 1853. The architect then is unknown.

The residence was at the end of Frederiksstaden. Sankt Annæ Plads was then a narrow street by one of the canals. The house was already sold in 1755, to a relative of the king. The residence originally had two floors and a mansard roof. In the 1850s, the house got an additional floor and a mezzanine under a new gable roof. At this point the canal was filled in and the street laid out in its place took on an esplanade-like appearance. The archive shows that various wealthy families lived in the house. The Swedish state acquired the property on 15 September 1921 from Mrs. Anna D Nörgaard and had it renovated as a residence for the Swedish ambassador. At the time of the purchase in 1921, the Swedish minister in Copenhagen Baron Joachim Beck-Friis, his sister the artist Stina Beck-Friis and the architect Torben Grut were involved in setting the premises in order. Even though the house was already equipped then, no major foundation strengthening of the building was done until 1941–1942, that is, in the middle of World War II. The head of mission during the war, Gustaf von Dardel, tells in his memoirs how the family moved from room to room as the repairs progressed. Among other things, an elevator was installed in the residence.

From the 1940s until the 1970s, the well-known Danish architect Flemming Grut was hired by the National Swedish Board of Public Building (Byggnadsstyrelsen) for the embassy's repairs and rebuilds. In the 1950s, an extensive and attention-grabbing renovation was carried out. Several Danish newspapers wrote about the work. They praised the modern decor and the high level of art found in the newly renovated premises. On the exterior, however, the renovation meant that the plaster was knocked down, exposing the light brick. During a renovation in the 1980s, these were plastered white again. In 1951-1953, refurbishment and rearrangement was carried out within the chancery building and the chancery got its own entrance. In 1962, an elevator was installed in the chancery building. At the end of the 1960s, a refurbishment of the residence part was carried out. During the 1980s, the National Swedish Board of Public Building equipped the chancery premises, which were also rebuilt. The embassy got a new waiting hall and reception. In the upper floors, offices were converted into residences. In 2001, the National Property Board of Sweden (SFV) carried out a window and facade renovation at the chancery and the ambassador's residence. In 2009, SFV inaugurated an accessible entrance so that you can take a lift directly from Sankt Annæ Plads up to the reception. In 2010, SFV renovated the building's facade.

The residence is furnished by the Ministry for Foreign Affairs' interior architects with an exquisite selection of mainly Swedish design. Examples include the specially designed long dining room table in walnut root from well-known Klaesson's Furniture in Fjugesta and the high-backed dining room chairs designed by Carl Malmsten. The serving tables come from Svenskt Tenn, the grand piano in the music room is made by Malmsjö. In the corner lounge there is the yellow carpet "Magdalena" from Märta Måås-Fjetterström's studio and a couch from Svenskt Tenn. The art on the walls represents Swedish artists from recent centuries, the vast majority with Danish connections. Perhaps the most famous is the artist Karl Isakson, who in Denmark is often considered Danish, because he lived most of his adult life there.

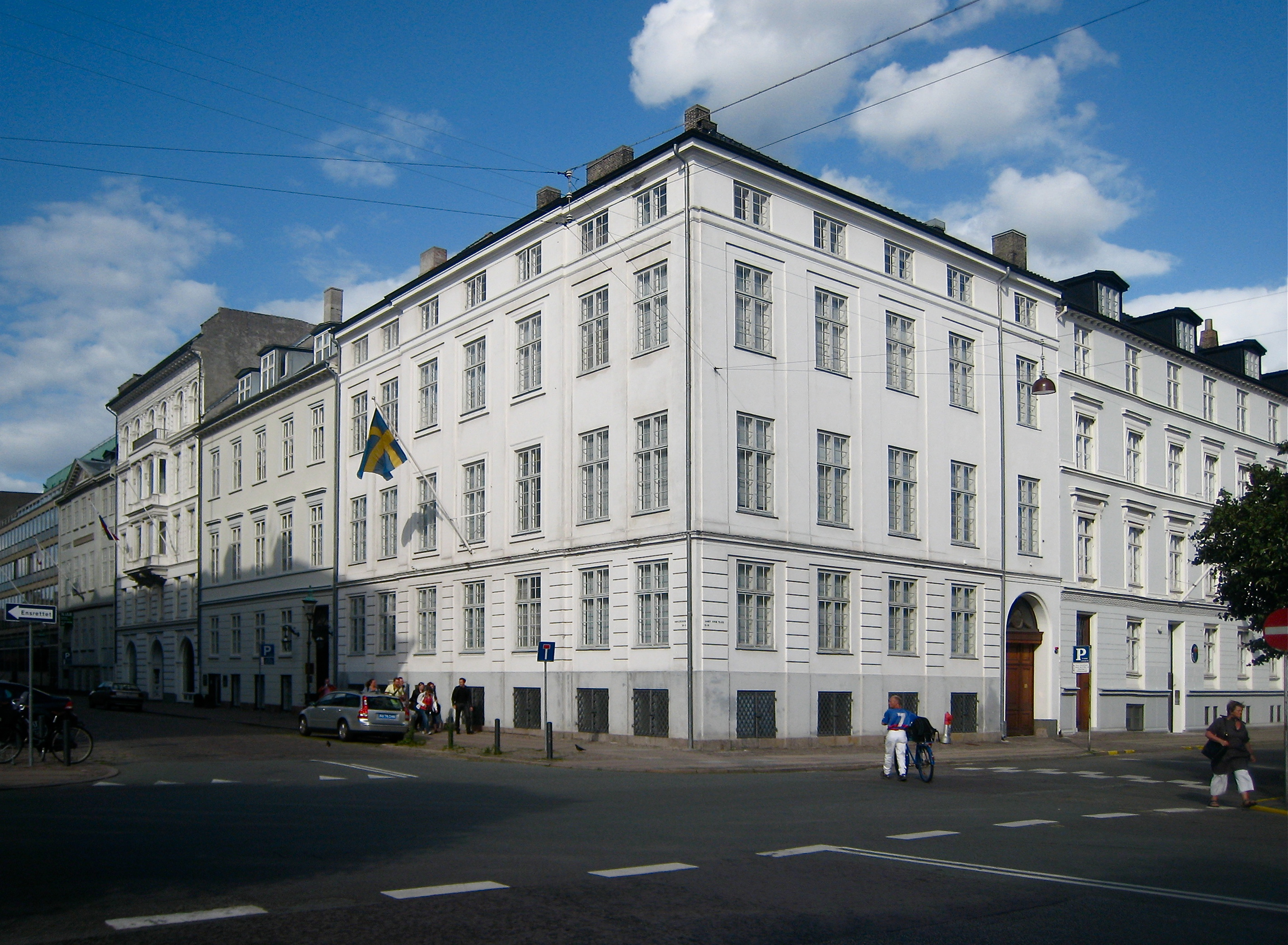
Exterior

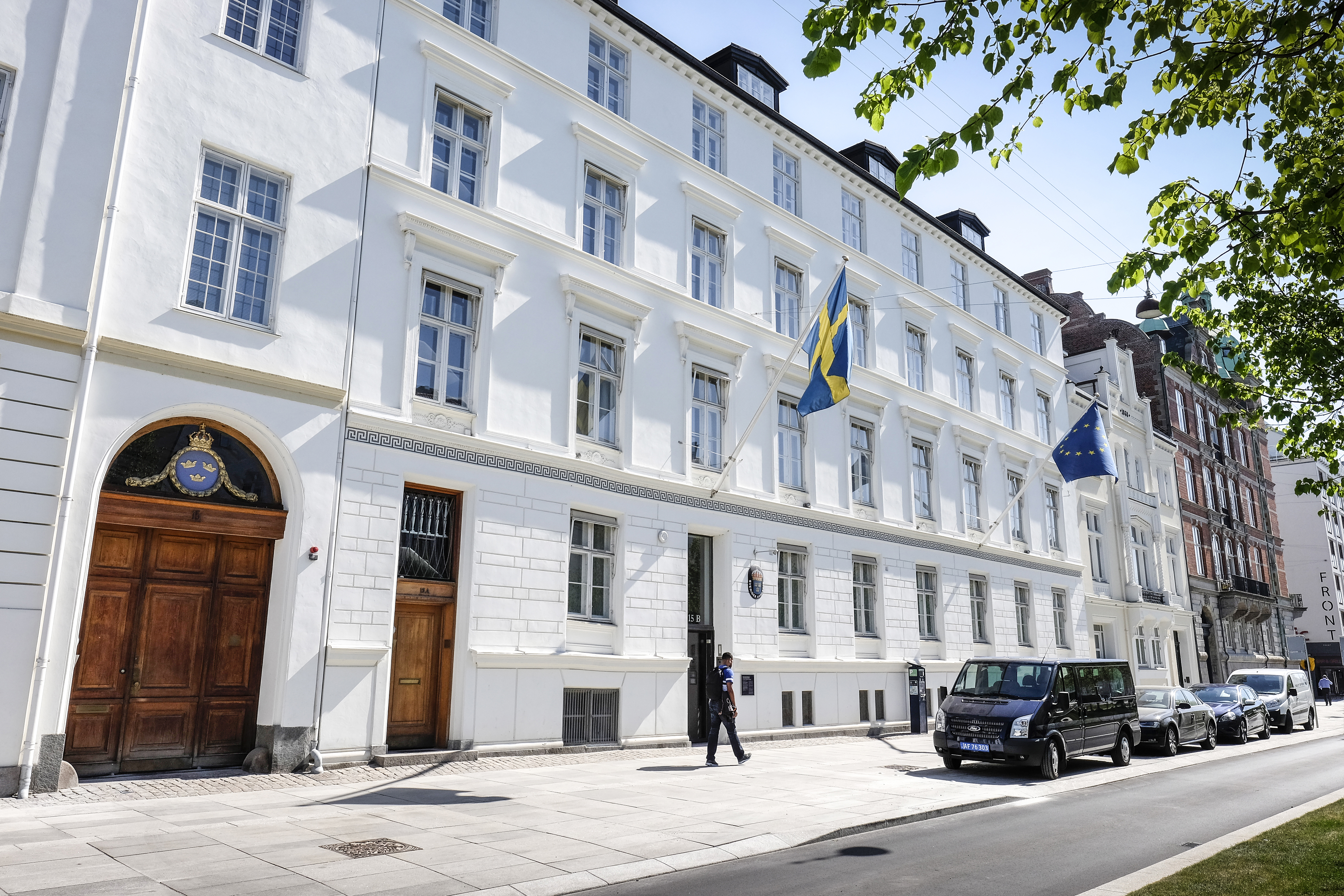
Exterior

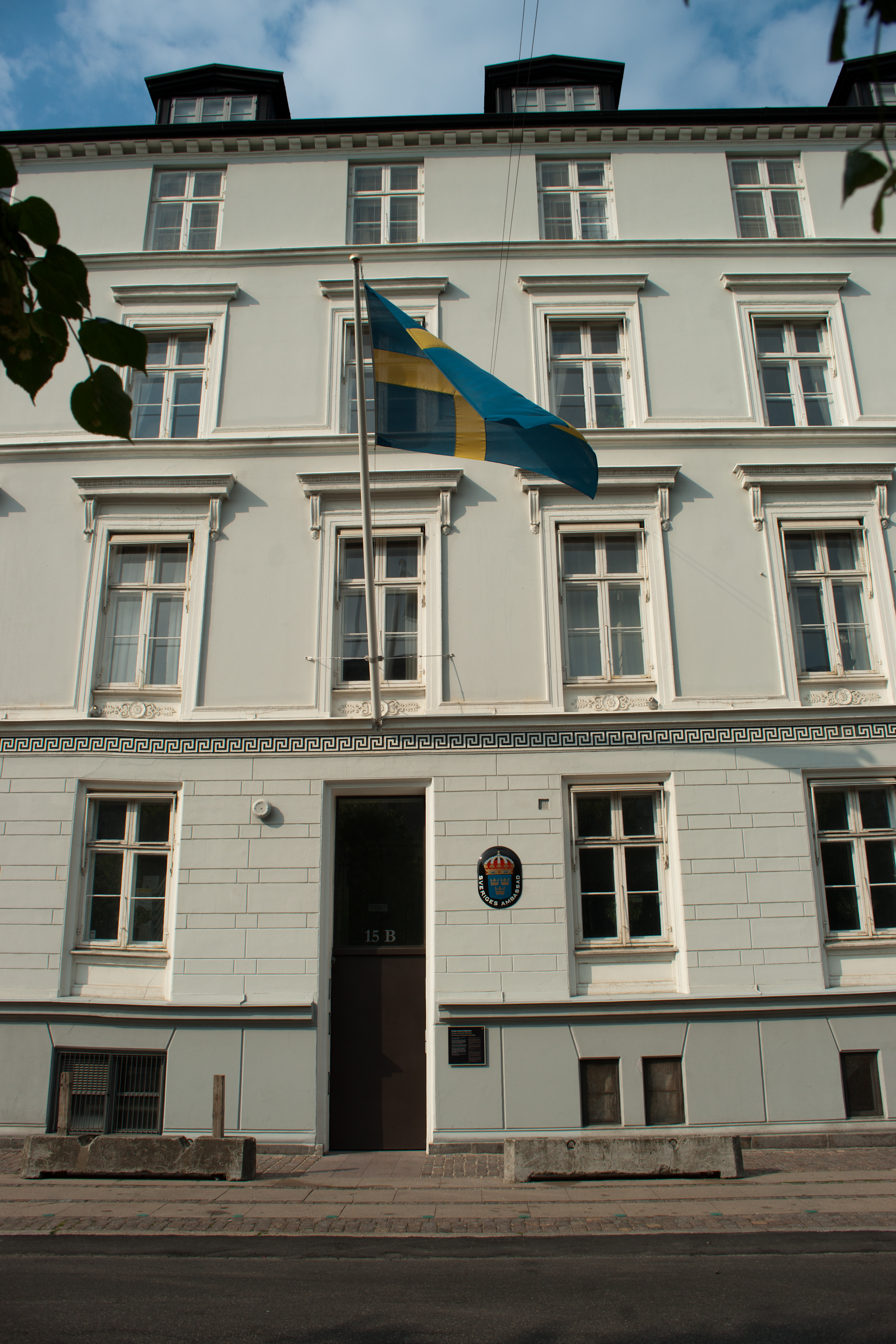
Exterior

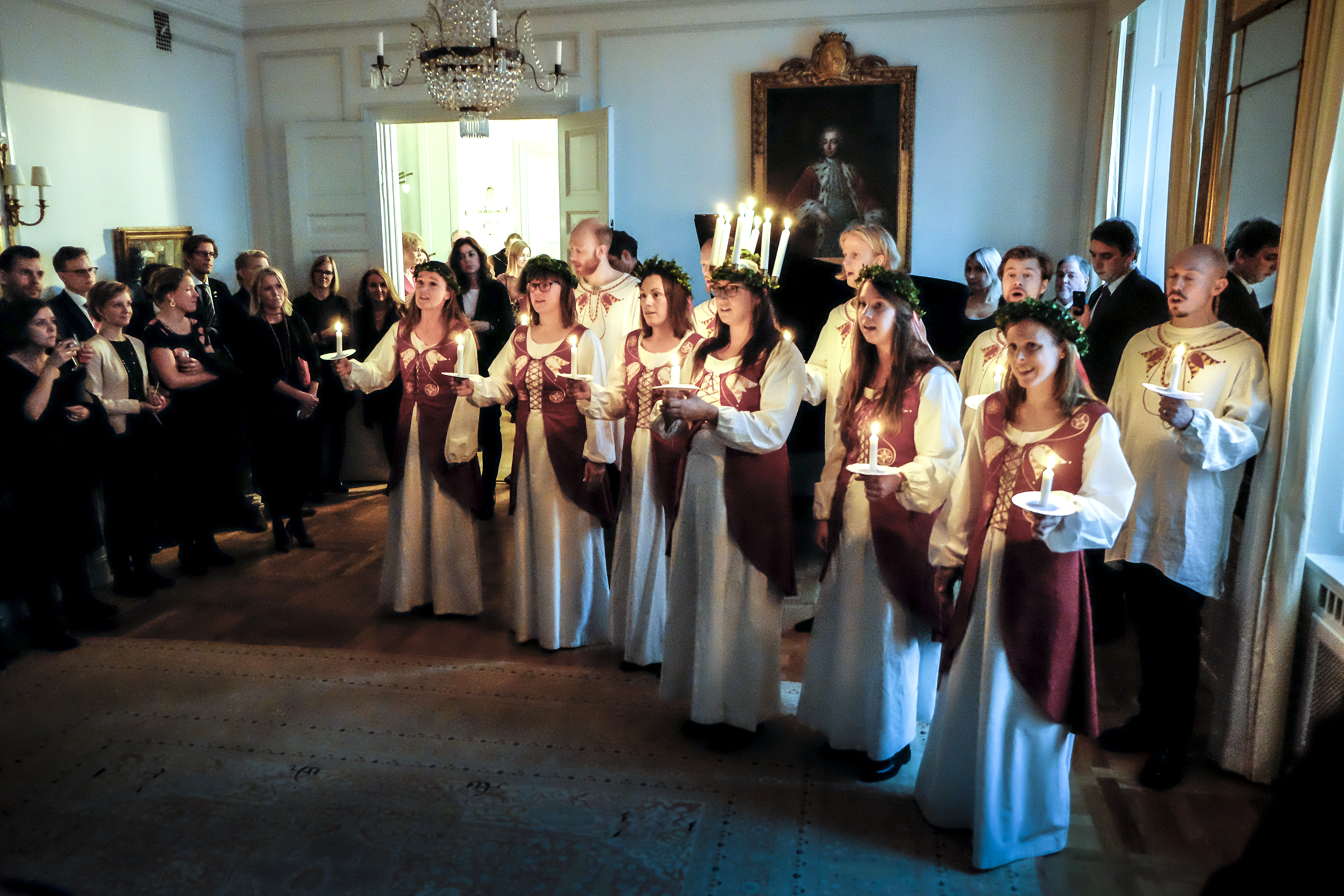
Interior during Saint Lucy's Day
