= Hans Wachtmeister =

Swedish admiral (1641/2–1714)

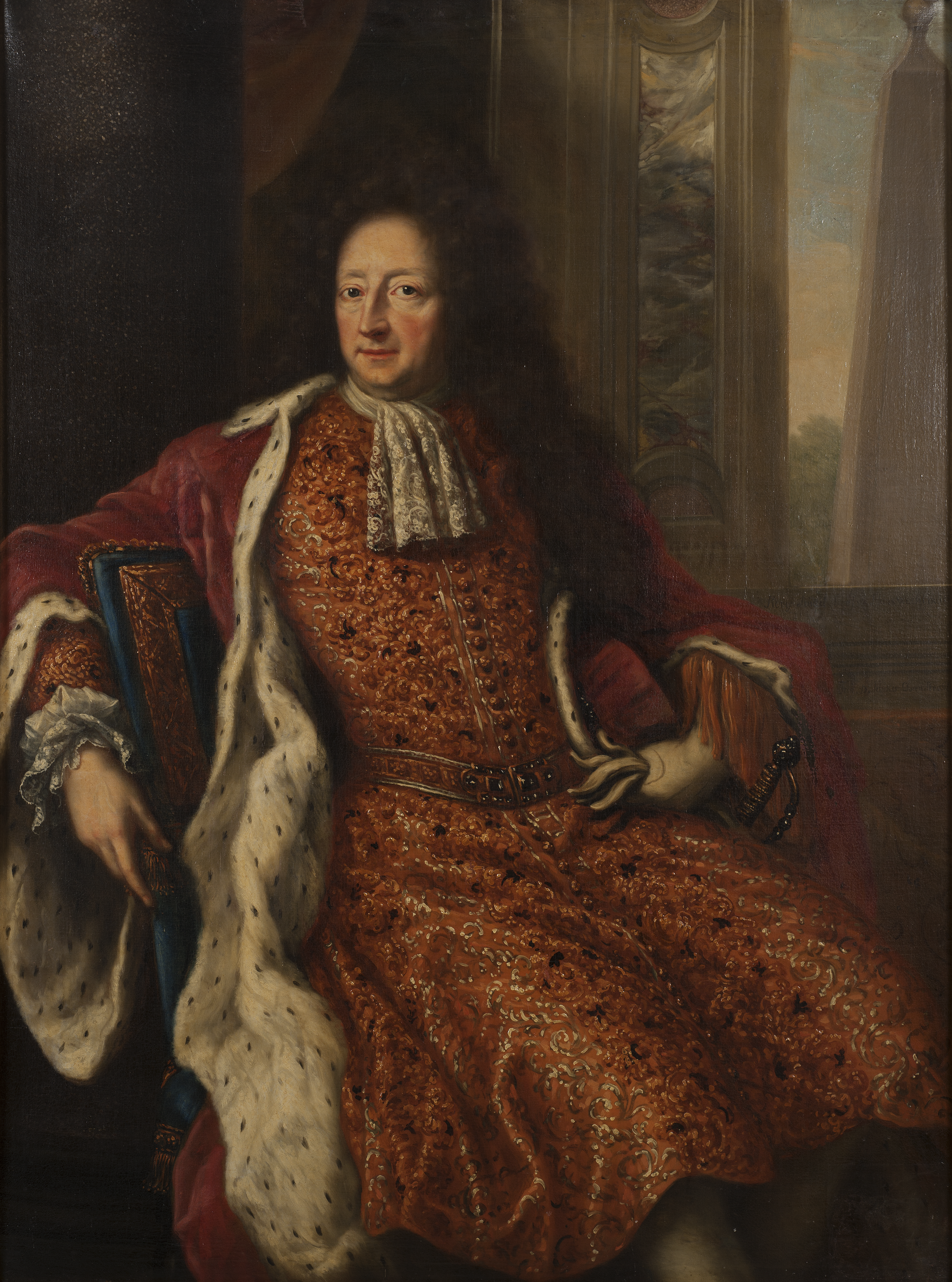
- Portrait by David Klöcker Ehrenstrahl, 1690
- Born: 24 December 1641; Stockholm, Sweden
- Died: 15 February 1714 (aged 72) Stockholm, Sweden
- Buried: Riddarholmen Church, Stockholm
- Allegiance: Sweden
- Branch: Navy
- Service years: 1666–1714
- Rank: General admiral
- Spouse: Sofia Lovisa von Ascheberg (m. 1685)
- Children: 7

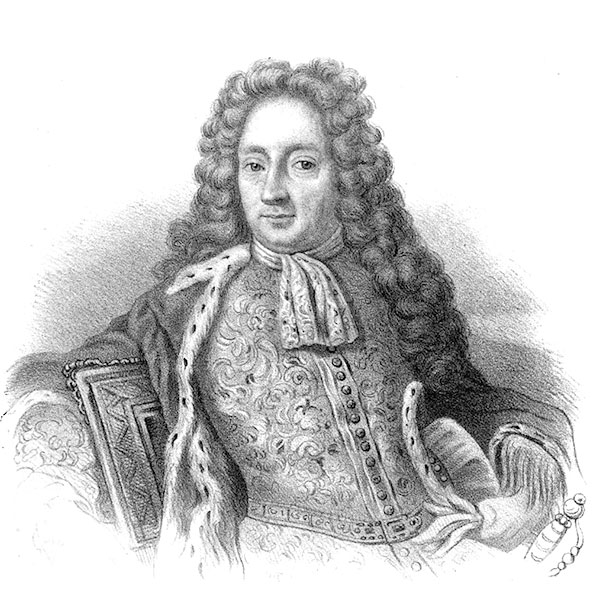
Hans Wachtmeister (1641–1714)

Hans Wachtmeister af Johannishus, (3 January 1642 [O.S. 24 December 1641] – 15 February [O.S. 26 February] 1714) was admiral general of the Swedish Navy and advisor to King Charles XI of Sweden and King Charles XII of Sweden. He served in the Scanian War of 1675–1679 and during the following twenty years of peace worked to build up the Swedish Navy. When the Great Northern War began in 1700 he was able to take his fleet to sea in good condition.

He was governor of Kalmar län between 1680 and 1683. When the new fleet base was established at Karlskrona in 1681, he became governor of a new enlarged county, Kalmar and Blekinge län. Hans Wachtmeister was also admiral general over the entire Swedish Fleet at the same time that he was a governor. In 1681–1683, he took the additional title of ståthållare or stadtholder.

He was raised to the dignity of a count in 1687 with the name of Wachtmeister af Johannishus and introduced in the Swedish House of Nobility in 1689 as number 25 among the families with the title of count [Grevliga ätter] in the List of Swedish noble families. His younger brother was Swedish field marshal Axel Wachtmeister, and his father-in-law was Rutger von Ascheberg. His eldest son was Admiral Count Carl Hans Wachtmeister (1689-1736).

== Sources ==
- Sven Grauers, Ätten Wachtmeister genom Tiderna (1942)
- Hans Wachtmeister, Historiesajten (in Swedish)
