= Constance Wachtmeister =

French-English theosophist and countess (1838-1910)

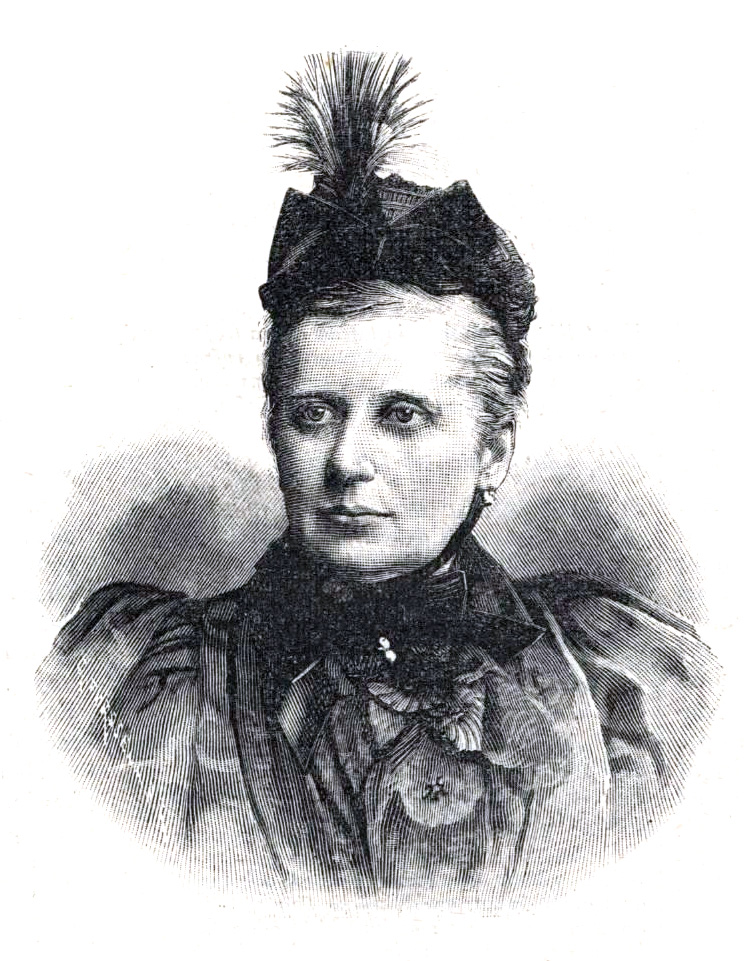
- Born: Constance Georgina Louise de Bourbel de Montpincon; 28 March 1838; Florence, Italy
- Died: 24 September 1910 (aged 72); Los Angeles, California, US
- Occupations: Editor, lecturer, theosophist
- Notable work: Reminiscences of H.P. Blavatsky and "The Secret Doctrine"
- Spouse: Carl Wachtmeister (married 1863)
- Children: 1 son
- Parents: Auguste de Bourbel de Montpincon; Constance Bulkley

Constance Georgina Louise Wachtmeister (née de Bourbel de Montpinçon; March 28, 1838 – September 24, 1910), known as Countess Wachtmeister, was a prominent theosophist, a close friend of Helena Blavatsky.

She was the daughter of a French marquis, but she was orphaned at an early age. She was raised in England by a maternal aunt. She married the Swedish politician Carl Wachtmeister, who was also her cousin. As a widow, she returned to England and joined the London Lodge of the Theosophical Society. Wachtmeister partnered with Blavatsky to work on The Secret Doctrine, and later organized a publishing company to publish Blavatsky's works. A memoir of her working relationship with Blavatsky was published posthumously, and has been used as a primary source for Blavatsky's biographers.

== Biography ==
Constance's parents were the Marquis de Bourbel de Montpincon and his wife Constance Bulkley. She lost her parents when she was very young and was sent to her aunt, Mrs Bulkley, in England. In 1863 she married her cousin, the Count Carl Wachtmeister, with whom she had a son, count Axel Raoul.

After three years of marriage she moved to Stockholm where, in 1868, the count was appointed Minister of Foreign Affairs. After the death of her husband in 1871, she still lived in Sweden for several years. In 1879 the countess began investigating Spiritism and in 1881 joined the London Lodge of the Theosophical Society. She met H.P. Blavatsky in London in 1884.

Wachtmeister was an important partner for Blavatsky and essential support for the work of The Secret Doctrine. Some time after Blavatsky had come in 1885 at Würzburg she was joined by the Wachtmeister, who "loyally and lovingly helped in the great work." In 1887 Wachtmeister organized the Theosophical Publishing Co. alongside Bertram Keightley, in order to publish Blavatsky's works. In 1888-95 she was an editor of the Theosophical Siftings. She was secretary and treasurer of the Blavatsky Lodge in London. In 1890 she became a member of the Inner Group of Blavatsky Lodge. In 1893 Besant and Wachtmeister went to India. In 1894 she had a lecture in New York City on theosophical questions. In 1896 Wachtmeister toured the US and Australia lecturing on Theosophy.

Wachtmeister and Kate Buffington Davis authored a vegetarian cookbook, Practical Vegetarian Cookery in 1897. The recipes were ovo-lacto vegetarian. It was one of the first vegetarian guidebooks published in America.

=== Reminiscences of Blavatsky ===
She has not left many written texts, but her work Reminiscences of H. P. Blavatsky and "The Secret Doctrine" is a source for a study on the personality of Madame Blavatsky.

Wachtmeister stated that she has now spent a few months with Blavatsky. "I have shared her room and been with her morning, noon and night. I have had access to all her boxes and drawers, have read the letters which she received and those which she wrote." Wachtmeister, who became Blavatsky's "guardian angel, domestically speaking, during the years of the composition of The Secret Doctrine in Germany and Belgium, has printed her account of a number of extraordinary occurrences of the period." In her Reminiscences Wachtmeister writes in detail of the many facts coming under her observation which pointed to extrinsic help in the Blavatsky's work. She wrote: "The Secret Doctrine will be indeed a great and grand work. I have had the privilege of watching its progress, of reading the manuscripts, and witnessing the occult way in which she derived her information."

Wachtmeister wrote, "When a printed copy [of The Secret Doctrine] was put into my hands, I was thankful to feel that all these hours of pain, toil and suffering had not been in vain, and that H.P.B. had been able to accomplish her task and give to the world this grand book, which, she told me, would have to wait quietly until the next century to be fully appreciated, and would only be studied by the few now."

== Publications ==
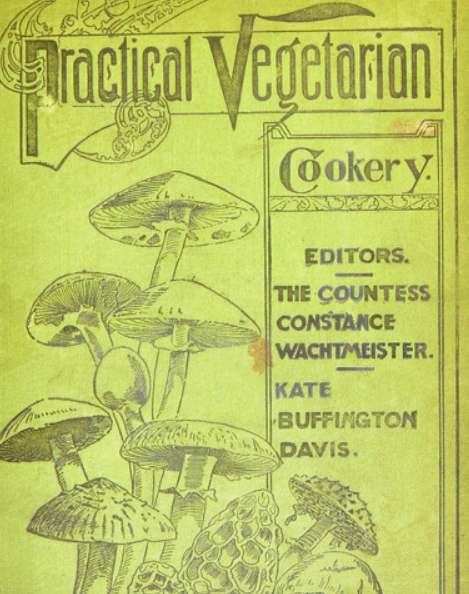
Practical Vegetarian Cookery, 1897

- Wachtmeister, Constance (1976). Reminiscences of H.P. Blavatsky and "The Secret Doctrine". Theosophical classics series (2nd ed.). Wheaton, Ill: Theosophical Pub. House. ISBN 0835604888. OCLC 2493519.
- Wachtmeister, Constance (1895). H. P. B. and the Present Crisis in the Theosophical Society. London: Women's printing society. OCLC 31245050.
- Wachtmeister, Constance (1895). Theosophy in Every-Day Life. Sidney. OCLC 46265300.
- Wachtmeister, Constance (1897). Spiritualism in the Light of Theosophy. San Francisco, Calif: Mercury Print. OCLC 14466635.
- Wachtmeister, Constance (1897). Practical Vegetarian Cookery. Chicago, Ill: Theosophical Book Concern. OCLC 3025026. (in co-authorship)
- Wachtmeister, Constance (2010). Psychic and Astral Development. Whitefish, MT: Kessinger Publishing. ISBN 978-1162833996.

=== Translations ===
- Вахтмейстер, Констанция (2011). Воспоминания о Е. П. Блаватской и "Тайной доктрине" [Reminiscences of H.P. Blavatsky and "The Secret Doctrine"]. Архивы. Исследования (in Russian). Одесса: Астропринт. ISBN 978-966-190-329-5.
- Wachtmeister, Constance (1979). "La doctrine secréte" et madame Blavatsky [Reminiscences of H.P. Blavatsky and "The Secret Doctrine"] (in French). Paris. OCLC 901210898.
- Wachtmeister, Constance (1894). H. P. Blavatsky och "Den hemliga läran" [Reminiscences of H.P. Blavatsky and "The Secret Doctrine"] (in Swedish). Göteborg. OCLC 465903582.
- Wachtmeister, Constance (1905). De theosofie in het dagelijksch leven [Theosophy in every-day life] (in Dutch). Amsterdam: Theosofische Uitgeversmaatschappij. OCLC 66294889.
