= Pehr Adlerfelt =

Swedish army officer

Baron Pehr Adlerfelt (1680–1743) was a Swedish colonel.

He was the brother of Gustaf Adlerfelt. In 1712 he was made colonel in the Swedish army and in 1720 was made a baron and in 1739 a member of the Riksrad (Council of the Kingdom).

He died in 1743 while defending Stockholm against the Dalecarlians.

== Sources ==
- Svenskt biografiskt handlexikon
