= Erik Wachtmeister =

Swedish Internet entrepreneur (born 1955)

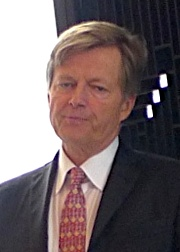
- Wachtmeister (2009)
- Born: 1955 (age 70–71); Sweden
- Education: Georgetown University (BS, 1977); INSEAD (MBA, 1983)
- Occupations: Founder and CEO, A Small World (2004-09); Founder and CEO, Best of All Worlds (2012-present)
- Years active: 1983-present
- Title: Count
- Spouse: Louise Wachtmeister (m. 2004)
- Children: 4
- Father: Wilhelm Wachtmeister
- Family: Wachtmeister family

Erik Wilhelm Wachtmeister (born 1955) is a Swedish Internet businessman. He founded the social media websites ASmallWorld and Best of All Worlds, both of which were targeted to the wealthy.

== Early life and education ==
Wachtmeister was born in Sweden, the son of Swedish diplomat and longtime ambassador to the United States Wilhelm Wachtmeister. He earned a Bachelor of Science in Foreign Service from Georgetown University in Washington, DC in 1977, and a Master of Business Administration from INSEAD in Paris in 1983.

He traveled often during his childhood, and has lived in numerous cities around the world, including Washington, DC, New York City, Los Angeles, Paris, London, Stockholm, Moscow and Kyiv.

== Career ==
=== Finance ===
Wachtmeister spent 16 years as an investment banker, working in London, New York and Los Angeles for Lehman Brothers, Rothschild and Ladenburg Thalmann. He started his own business in 1993, raising private money for publicly listed companies. In 2000, he became the founding CEO of UK-based investment firm Viking Internet, which he later took public on the London Stock Exchange.

=== A Small World ===
In March 2004, Wachtmeister and his wife Louise Wachtmeister founded the social networking website A Small World as an exclusive social networking site for a worldwide community of people already connected by three degrees of separation. It launched at almost the same time as MySpace and Facebook, two years before Facebook was made available to non-college students. It was dubbed "MySpace for millionaires" by The Wall Street Journal. To maintain its desired exclusivity, A Small World, while free, was invitation-only, open only to those invited by an existing member. Whereas Facebook soon opened its membership to everyone, A Small World remained exclusive.

Wachtmeister has said the idea for an exclusive worldwide social networking site occurred to him in 1998, during a wild boar hunt in the German forest. Over the course of his travels, he identified an existing niche community of people with similar lifestyles and tastes. He wanted to provide them with a platform to network and share information.

On May 22, 2006, the Weinstein Company announced its investment in A Small World. At the time, A Small World had approximately 130,000 members. Harvey Weinstein said his company planned to expand the site's membership and bring in additional advertisers. It was the Weinstein Company's first investment in an Internet property. After launching online advertising in 2006, the website had 100 partners. Advertisers included Jaguar, Diane von Furstenberg, Mercedes-Benz, Cartier, and Moet & Chandon.

By April 2009, membership was in excess of 500,000. Wachtmeister resigned as chairman in 2009; he left the board in 2010. Weinstein sold his stake in the company in 2009.

=== Best of All Worlds ===
Wachtmeister and his wife launched Best of All Worlds on August 27, 2012, as an invitation-only, free social media website and iPhone and iPad app. Wachtmeister is CEO.

Wachtmeister started circulating invitations for the site in May 2012. The site was financed by a San Francisco-based venture capital firm and private investors from Europe and the Middle East, including a member of the Saudi royal family. Prior to its launch, 25,000 people from 120 countries had registered through its pre-released iPhone app. As of February 2014, the site claims to have over 30,000 registered users.

== Personal life ==
Wachtmeister is married to Countess Louise Wachtmeister. They were married in 2004.
