= Wilhelm Wachtmeister =

Swedish career diplomat (1923–2012)

Count Wilhelm Wachtmeister
- Born: Wilhelm Hans Fredrik Wachtmeister; 29 April 1923; Östra Göinge, Sweden
- Died: 3 February 2012 (aged 88); Stockholm, Sweden
- Education: Stockholm University College
- Occupation: Diplomat
- Years active: 1946–1989
- Spouse: Ulla Leuhusen (m. 1947–2012)
- Children: 3, including Erik
- Family: Wachtmeister family

Count Wilhelm Hans Fredrik Wachtmeister (29 April 1923 – 3 February 2012) was a Swedish career diplomat who served as the Swedish Ambassador to the United States for 15 years from 1974 to 1989, eventually becoming the Dean of the Diplomatic Corps in 1986, as the longest-serving ambassador in the diplomatic corps in Washington, DC.

== Early life ==
Wachtmeister was born on 29 April 1923 at Wanås Castle in Östra Göinge Municipality, Sweden, the son of cabinet chamberlain, Count Gustaf Wachtmeister and his wife Margaretha (née Trolle). He passed studentexamen at Sigtunaskolan Humanistiska Läroverket in 1941 and received as Candidate of Law degree from Stockholm University College in 1946 and was hired by the Ministry for Foreign Affairs as an attaché the same year.

== Career ==
Wachtmeister served in Vienna in 1947, Madrid in 1949, Lisbon in 1950 and the Foreign Ministry in Stockholm in 1950. He became second secretary at the Foreign Ministry in 1952 and was appointed embassy secretary in Moscow in 1955. Wachtmeister was first secretary there in 1956. Wachtmeister's first prominent role within the diplomatic community was as U.N. Secretary-General Dag Hammarskjöld's personal assistant from 1958 to 1961. He was appointed Director (Byråchef) in 1962 and he was Deputy Head of the Political Department at the Foreign Ministry in Stockholm from 1965 to 1966. Wachtmeister was ambassador in Algiers from 1966 to 1967 and served as Director (Utrikesråd) and Head of the Political Department at the Foreign Ministry from 1968 to 1974.

In 1974, Wachtmeister was appointed ambassador in Washington, D.C. and eventually became Dean of the Diplomatic Corps. Wachtmeister's predecessor as Dean of the Diplomatic Corps was the Soviet Union's ambassador, which led Wachtmeister to famously quip that this was the first time that a Count had succeeded a communist. Despite being the Swedish Ambassador during a period of turbulent U.S.-Swedish relations engendered by Swedish opposition to the Vietnam War and soon-to-be Prime Minister Olof Palme's declaration that President Richard Nixon was a war criminal for his decision to bomb Cambodia, Wachtmeister managed to forge good relations with successive U.S. Presidential administrations, and even became the first President Bush's favorite tennis partner.

Wachtmeister left the Swedish diplomatic service in 1989 and then worked as advisor to the chairman of AB Volvo from 1989 to 1994 and as international advisor to the Coudert Brothers law firm in Washington, D.C. from 1989 to 1994. He was chairman of the Swedish-American Chamber of Commerce from 1993 to 1995.

== Personal life ==
In 1947, he married Ulla Leuhusen (born 1926), the daughter to colonel, friherre Nils Leuhusen and Liv (née Eyde). They had three children; Anna (born 1948), Christina (born 1949), and Erik (born 1955).

== Death ==
Wachtmeister died on 3 February 2012 and was buried on 5 May 2012 at Gryt Cemetery in Östra Göinge Municipality.

== Awards and decorations ==
- (Sweden) Commander of the Order of the Polar Star (11 November 1972)
- (Denmark) Knight of the Order of the Dannebrog
- Knight First Class of the Order of the Lion of Finland

== Bibliography ==
- Wachtmeister, Wilhelm (1996). Som jag såg det: händelser och människor på världsscenen (in Swedish). Stockholm: Norstedt. ISBN 91-1-962772-6. SELIBR 7157097.
- Wachtmeister, Wilhelm (2009). Som jag såg det: händelser och människor på världsscenen (in Swedish) (New ed.). Stockholm: Norstedt. ISBN 978-91-86193-49-2. SELIBR 11317644.

Diplomatic posts
Preceded by Bengt Rabaeus	Ambassador of Sweden to Algeria; 1966–1967	Succeeded by Claës König
Preceded by Hubert de Bèsche	Ambassador of Sweden to the United States; 1974–1989	Succeeded by Anders Thunborg
