= Louise Wachtmeister =

Swedish businesswoman (born 1978)

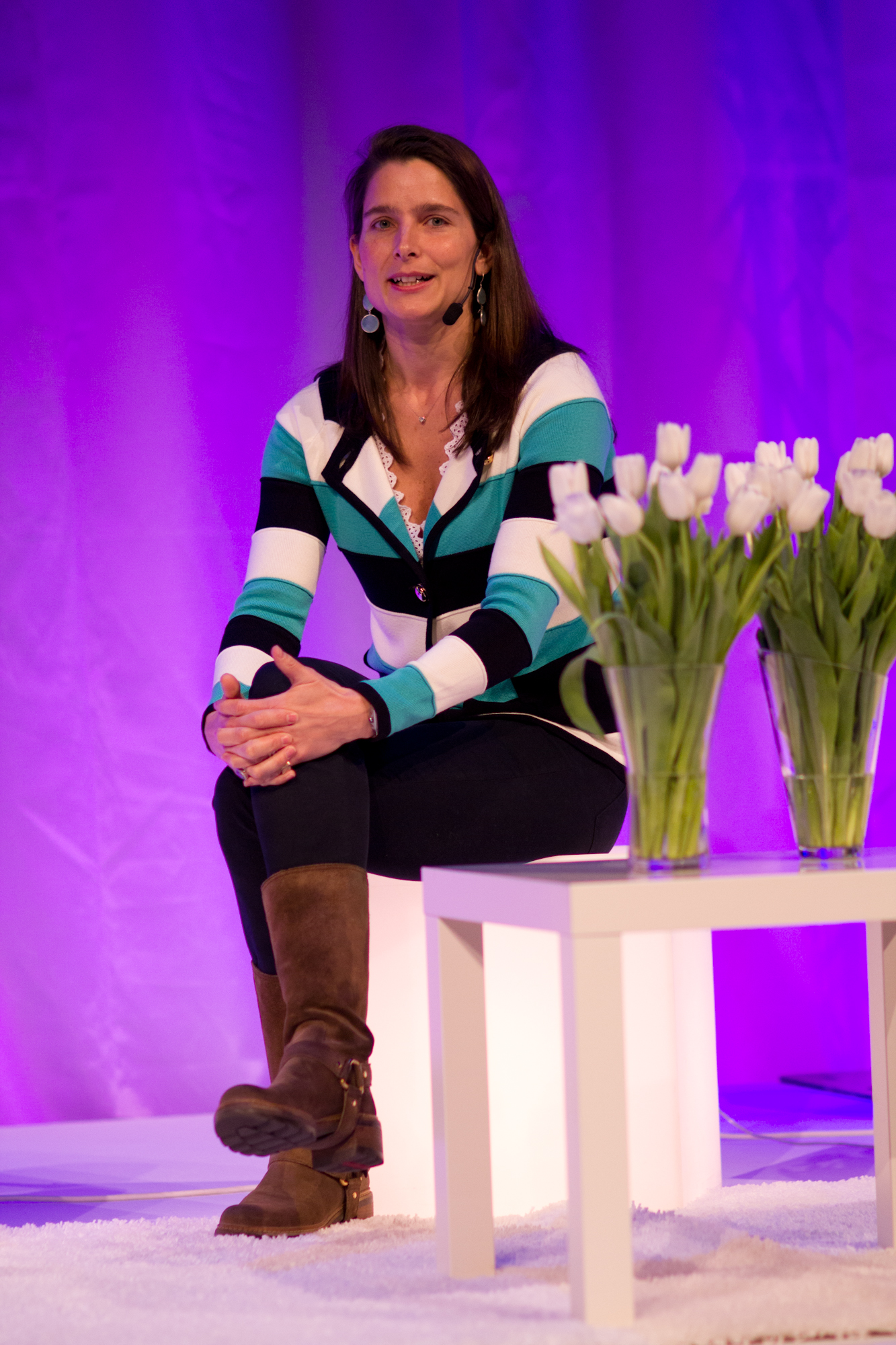
- Webbdagarna, 2012
- Born: Louise Austern; 28 April 1978 (age 48)
- Known for: Co-Founder, ASMALLWORLD
- Title: Countess
- Spouse: Count Erik Wachtmeister

Countess Louise Wachtmeister (born 28 April 1978) is a Swedish entrepreneur, athlete, and political activist. She has held elected positions with the Stockholm City Hall and Stockholm District Court. She is a gold and silver medalist in the Swedish National Track Championships, and in 2004 co-founded the social networking website ASMALLWORLD with her husband Erik Wachtmeister. Dubbed "MySpace for millionaires" by the Wall Street Journal, the network had 320,000 members in 2008.

== Early life, education ==
Wachtmeister was born as Louise Austern in Sweden. In her youth she became involved in political activism, and served as President of the largest chapter of the Conservative Youth Party in Stockholm for four years. She also participated in two elections, including the election of Sweden's entry into the European Union in 1994. She later held elected positions with the Stockholm City Hall and Stockholm District Court. In 2001 Wachtmeister completed her master thesis on branding at the Stockholm School of Economics (Handelshögskolan i Stockholm). In 2001-2002 Wachtmeister worked at the JKL Group, a leading PR company in the Nordic region. Wachtmeister was a silver and gold medalist in the 400 and 800 meter relay in the Swedish National Track Championships, where she competed under her maiden name Austern.

== Asmallworld ==
In March 2004, Wachtmeister and her husband Erik Wachtmeister co-founded the social networking website ASMALLWORLD. She served as marketing director and Director of Communications for the company, and Erik served as CEO and Chairman. The website launched two years before Facebook was made available to non-college members, and was dubbed "MySpace for millionaires" by the Wall Street Journal. As of September 2007, the site had 150,000 users, including Naomi Campbell, Paris Hilton, and Tiger Woods. By May 2008, the number had grown to 320,000 members, with about 65% of members from Europe and 20% from the United States. By April 2010, the Wachtmeisters had ceased to be active with managing the website, and membership was in excess of 500,000.

== Personal life ==
Wachtmeister is married to Count Erik Wachtmeister.
