= Baltzar von Platen (1766–1829) =

Swedish naval officer and statesman

Count Baltzar von Platen
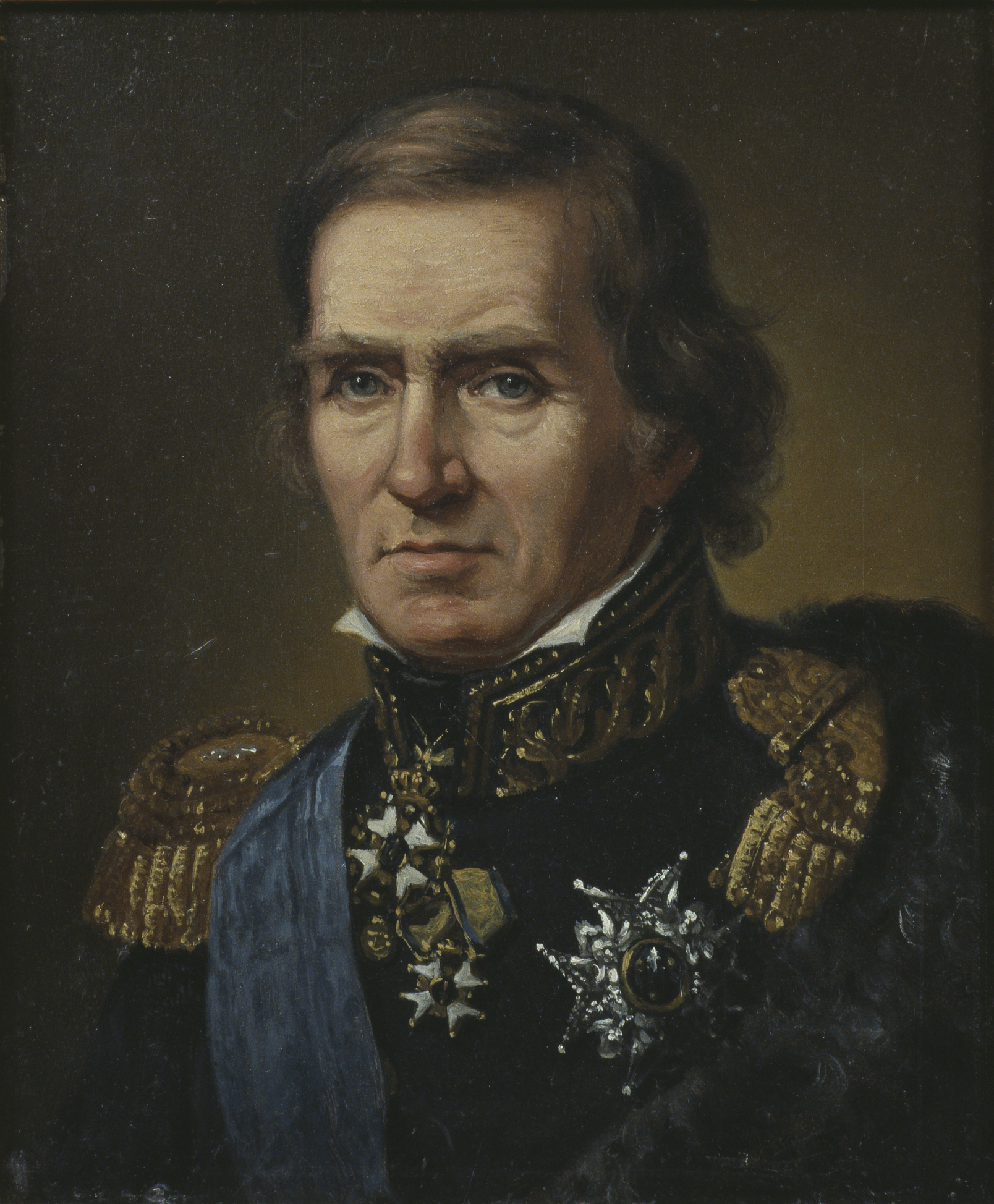

Governor-general of Norway
- In office 1827–1829
- Preceded by: Johan August Sandels
- Succeeded by: Johan Caspar Herman Wedel-Jarlsberg

Personal details
- Born: 29 May 1766 Rügen, Swedish Pomerania
- Died: 6 December 1829 (aged 63) Christiania, Norway
- Spouse: Hedvig Elisabeth Ekman
- Occupation: Naval officer, Architect

Count Baltzar Bogislaus von Platen (29 May 1766 – 6 December 1829) was a Swedish naval officer and statesman. He was Governor-general of Norway from 1827 to 1829.

== Biography ==
A member of the noble Platen family, von Platen was born on the island of Rügen, Swedish Pomerania (now in Germany), to Philip Julius Bernhard von Platen, Field Marshal and Governor General of Pomerania, and Regina Juliana von Usedom.

At the age of 13, Baltzar entered the Royal Swedish Navy where he served with distinction until resigning in 1800, having attained the rank of captain.

Following the revolution in 1809 he became a member of the Privy Council and, in the following year, received a promotion to rear admiral. He was also made chairman of the Göta Canal directorate charged with constructing a canal across Sweden. The canal, following a design by Thomas Telford, would only be completed in 1832, after von Platen's death, but during its construction, he did discover two skilled mechanical engineering brothers John Ericsson and Nils Ericson.

He was appointed Governor-general of Norway on 26 November 1827, a position which he held until his death in Christiania (modern name Oslo), the Norwegian capital, on 6 December 1829.

He was married to Hedvig Elisabeth Ekman. Baltzar von Platen's grave is at the side of the Göta Canal in Motala, where it is something of a tourist attraction, especially for canal visitors.

== Honors ==
He was elected a member of the Royal Swedish Academy of Sciences in 1815.

One of the early vessels built at Hammarsten shipyard in Norrköping was named after Baltzar von Platen in 1834.

Government offices
Preceded by Johan August Sandels	Governor-general of Norway; 1827–1829	Succeeded by Johan Caspar Herman Wedel-Jarlsberg
