= Axel Wachtmeister =

Swedish field marshal (1643–1699)

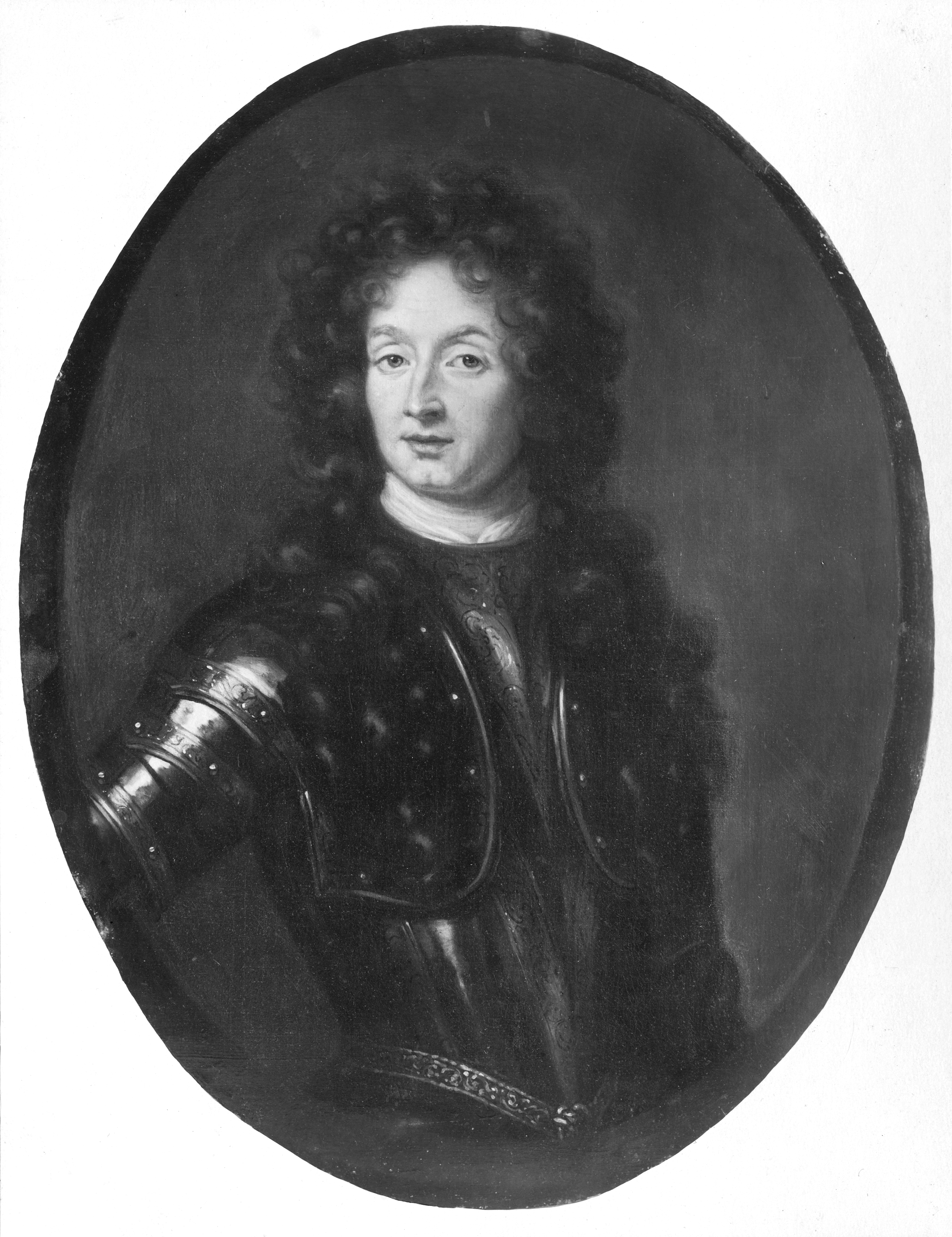
- Born: Axel Wachtmeister; 13 January 1643; Stockholm
- Died: 24 July 1699 (aged 56); Stockholm
- Resting place: Riddarholmen Church
- Occupation: Military personnel
- Spouse(s): Anna Maria Soop
- Parent(s): Hans Wachtmeister af Björkö; Agnes Margrete von Helmstedt

Axel Wachtmeister (13 January 1643 – 24 July 1699) was a Swedish count and field marshal.

Axel Wachtmeister was the younger son of Hans Wachtmeister and Agnes Margareta von Helmstedt. His elder brother was Swedish admiral (and their father's namesake) Hans Wachtmeister. His father was a member of an Estonian-Finnish-German family of incorporated Swedish nobles, and was elevated to the title of Baron of Koivisto, near Viipuri, eastern Finland, in 1653.

Axel Wachtmeister distinguished himself in the Scanian War (1675–1679), became a colonel in 1676 and was appointed Major General in 1679. In 1697, he was appointed chairman in the War College, the headquarters of the Swedish Army. From 1680 and onwards, he had the title Royal Counsellor and was a close associate of King Charles XI. Baron Axel Wachtmeister became count of Mälsåker and field marshal in 1693.

He married Baroness Anna Maria Soop (1660-1735), who married Carl Gyllenstierna 7 years after his death.
