= Carl Wachtmeister (footballer) =

Swedish footballer

Calle Wachtmeister
Personal information
- Full name: Carl Fredrik Gustaf Wachtmeister
- Date of birth: 23 June 1989 (age 37)
- Place of birth: Sweden
- Position: Goalkeeper

Team information
- Current team: Trelleborgs FF
- Number: 32

Youth career
- Lunds BK

Senior career*
Years	Team	Apps	(Gls)
2007–	Trelleborgs FF	2	(0)
- * Club domestic league appearances and goals as of 25 November 2013

Carl Fredrik Gustaf Wachtmeister (born 23 June 1989) is a Swedish footballer who plays for Trelleborgs FF as a goalkeeper.
