= Carl Wachtmeister (politician) =

Swedish noble, diplomat and politician

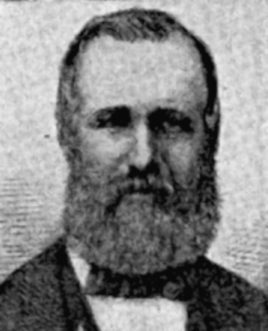

Foreign minister of the United Kingdoms of Sweden and Norway
- In office 1868–1871
- Preceded by: Ludvig Manderström
- Succeeded by: Baltzar von Platen

Personal details
- Born: 21 April 1823 Stockholm, Sweden
- Died: 14 October 1871 (aged 48)

Carl Wachtmeister (21 April 1823 – 14 October 1871) was a Swedish count, diplomat and politician who was foreign minister of the United Kingdoms of Sweden and Norway from 1868 to 1871.

== Biography ==
Carl Wachtmeister, born 21 April 1823 in Stockholm, was the oldest son of count Carl Johan Wachtmeister and Francèse Louise von Rehausen, and grandson of count and admiral Claes Adam Wachtmeister. Gotthard Wachtmeister was his younger brother.

He started his diplomatic career as attaché in Berlin in 1843, was made chargé d'affaires and consul-general in Italy in 1850 and was sent as envoy extraordinary and minister plenipotentiary to Copenhagen in 1858. In September 1861 he was sent as a special envoy to Turin and later in 1861 appointed envoy first in Constantinople and then in London. He returned to Copenhagen in this capacity in 1865.

4 June 1868 he was appointed prime minister for foreign affairs (the title used for the foreign minister at that time) as successor to Ludvig Manderström and made Lord of the Realm, the same year as the title was abolished. Wachtmeister died unexpectedly 14 October 1871 and was succeeded as foreign minister by Baltzar von Platen.
