= List of ambassadors of Sweden to Cambodia =

Ambassador of Sweden to Cambodia
- Lesser coat of arms of the Kingdom of Sweden
- Incumbent; Anna Hammargren since 2023
- Ministry for Foreign Affairs; Swedish Embassy, Phnom Penh
- Style: His or Her Excellency (formal); Mr. or Madam Ambassador (informal)
- Reports to: Minister for Foreign Affairs
- Seat: Bangkok, Thailand (Note: Sweden’s ambassador in Bangkok is co-accredited in Phnom Penh.)
- Appointer: Government of Sweden
- Term length: No fixed term
- Inaugural holder: Tord Hagen
- Formation: January 1961

The Ambassador of Sweden to Cambodia (known formally as the Ambassador of the Kingdom of Sweden to the Kingdom of Cambodia) is the official representative of the government of Sweden to the king of Cambodia and government of Cambodia. Since Sweden does not have an embassy in Phnom Penh, Sweden's ambassador in Bangkok is co-accredited in Phnom Penh.

== History ==
Sweden recognized Cambodia by voting in favor of the country's admission to the United Nations in December 1955. On 18 January 1961, an agreement was reached between Sweden and Cambodia to establish diplomatic relations. Sweden's ambassador in Bangkok, Tord Hagen, was appointed to also be ambassador in Phnom Penh. In March the same year, he presented his credentials to Cambodia's head of state, Prince Norodom Sihanouk.

In October 1975, it was reported that the Cambodian government had granted agrément to Sweden's ambassador in Beijing, Kaj Björk. He was then co-accredited as Swedish ambassador in Phnom Penh. Björk was thereby one of the first diplomats to be granted agrément in Cambodia after the Khmer Rouge took power there in April 1975.

From the formation of the satellite state People's Republic of Kampuchea in 1979 until the monarchy was restored in 1993, Sweden had no accredited ambassador in Cambodia. From 1993, Sweden's ambassador in Bangkok was co-accredited in Phnom Penh.

From the 1990s until 2010, Sweden had a section office (Development Co-operation Section) in Phnom Penh, under the Swedish embassy in Bangkok. This section office was staffed with SIDA personnel, where the head of the office had the diplomatic rank of counsellor (and in the final year minister counsellor).

Sweden opened an embassy in Cambodia in August 2010. On 26 November 2020, the Swedish government decided that the embassy would be closed down. In November 2021, the embassy in Phnom Penh was closed, and on 1 December 2021 it was converted into a section office, under the embassy in Bangkok. (Note: On 22 December 2023, the Swedish government decided to phase out the bilateral development cooperation with Cambodia as of 31 December 2024, and thus it was also decided that the section office in Phnom Penh would be closed on 30 September 2024.) Thereafter, the Swedish ambassador in Bangkok was once again co-accredited to Phnom Penh.

== List of representatives ==
| Name | Period | Resident / Non-resident | Title | Resident / Concurrent accreditation | Notes | Presented credentials | Ref |
Kingdom of Cambodia (1953–1970)
| Tord Hagen | 1961–1964 | Non-resident | Ambassador | Resident in Bangkok | | March 1961 | |
| Lennart Petri | 1965–1969 | Non-resident | Ambassador | Resident in Beijing | | | |
| Arne Björnberg | 1969–1970 | Non-resident | Ambassador | Resident in Beijing | Political appointee (non-career diplomat) | | |
Khmer Republic (1970–1975)
| Arne Björnberg | 1970–1974 | Non-resident | Ambassador | Resident in Beijing | Political appointee (non-career diplomat) | | |
Democratic Kampuchea (1975–1979)
| Kaj Björk | 1975–1979 | Non-resident | Ambassador | Resident in Beijing | Political appointee (non-career diplomat) | | |
People's Republic of Kampuchea (1979–1989) and State of Cambodia (1989–1993)
| – | 1979–1993 | Non-resident | Ambassador | | Vacant | | |
Kingdom of Cambodia (1993–present)
| Eva Heckscher | 1993–1996 | Non-resident | Ambassador | Resident in Bangkok | | | |
| Sven-Åke-Svensson | 1996–1999 | Resident | Counsellor | | | | |
| Inga Eriksson Fogh | 1997–1998 | Non-resident | Ambassador | Resident in Bangkok | | | |
| Daniel Asplund | 1999–2002 | Resident | Counsellor | | | | |
| Jan Axel Nordlander | 1999–2004 | Non-resident | Ambassador | Resident in Bangkok | | | |
| Claes Leijon | 2002–2006 | Resident | Counsellor | | | | |
| Jonas Hafström | 2004–2007 | Non-resident | Ambassador | Resident in Bangkok | | | |
| Eva Smedberg | 2006–2009 | Resident | Counsellor | | | | |
| Lennart Linnér | 2007–2010 | Non-resident | Ambassador | Resident in Bangkok | | 4 January 2008 | |
| Eva Asplund | 2009–2010 (Note: Asplund remained minister counsellor after the embassy opened in 2010, but no longer acted as head now that a resident ambassador had been appointed in connection with the opening of the embassy.) | Resident | Minister counsellor | | | | |
| Anne Höglund | 2010–2013 | Resident | Ambassador | | | | |
| Anna Maj Hultgård | 2013–2016 | Resident | Ambassador | | | 24 October 2013 | |
| Maria Sargren | September 2016 – 2019 | Resident | Ambassador | | | 7 October 2016 | |
| Björn Häggmark | 1 September 2019 – 2021 | Resident | Ambassador | | | 7 November 2019 | |
| Jon Åström Gröndahl | 2021–2023 | Non-resident | Ambassador | Resident in Bangkok | | 22 April 2022 | |
| Anna Hammargren | 2023–present | Non-resident | Ambassador | Resident in Bangkok | | 19 February 2024 | |
