= Eric Virgin =

Eric Virgin may refer to:

- Eric Virgin (officer) (1876–1950), Swedish Air Force lieutenant general and Chief of the Air Force
- Eric Virgin (diplomat) (1920–2004), Swedish diplomat
