= List of ambassadors of Sweden to Sudan =

Ambassador of Sweden to Sudan
- Lesser coat of arms of the Kingdom of Sweden
- Incumbent; Magnus Collett; Special Envoy since 2025
- Ministry for Foreign Affairs; Swedish Embassy, Khartoum
- Style: His or Her Excellency (formal); Mr. or Madam Ambassador (informal)
- Reports to: Minister for Foreign Affairs
- Residence: 33rd Ave E, Khartoum 2
- Seat: Stockholm, Sweden (Note: The Swedish ambassador has been based in Stockholm since the civil war broke out in April 2023.)
- Appointer: Government of Sweden
- Term length: No fixed term
- Inaugural holder: Eyvind Bratt
- Formation: 1957
- Website: Swedish Embassy, Khartoum

The Ambassador of Sweden to Sudan (known formally as the Ambassador of the Kingdom of Sweden to the Republic of the Sudan) is the official representative of the government of Sweden to the president of Sudan and government of Sudan.

== History ==
In August 1957, the Swedish minister in Addis Ababa, envoy Eyvind Bratt, was appointed to also be envoy in Khartoum. He thus became the first Swedish diplomat to be accredited to Sudan.

Sweden recognized Sudan on 27 November 1958. The announcement was made by envoy Eyvind Bratt.

In 1960, Åke Sjölin became the first ambassador accredited to Khartoum. He presented his credentials to Prime Minister General Ibrahim Abboud in June 1960.

Sweden had a diplomatic presence in Sudan from 1966 to 1969, in the form of an embassy led by Bengt Rösiö as chargé d'affaires. The embassy was established to support an irrigation project aimed at helping nomads settle, but the project collapsed following the Six-Day War, when Sudan cut ties with the United States and Germany, leading to the withdrawal of key partners and Sweden's eventual closure of the embassy.

In December 2007, the government decided to establish an embassy in Khartoum. The reason was that a permanent diplomatic presence in Sudan would enable Sweden to act more forcefully in peace and conflict management efforts in Sudan.

The Swedish embassy in Khartoum closed when fighting broke out in April 2023. The ambassador has since operated from Stockholm.

== List of representatives ==
Name	Period	Resident/Non resident	Title	Notes	Ref
Republic of the Sudan (1956–1969)
Eyvind Bratt	1957–1959	Non-resident	Envoy	Resident in Addis Ababa.	
Åke Sjölin	1960–1964	Non-resident	Ambassador	Resident in Addis Ababa.	
Erland Kleen	1964–1966	Non-resident	Ambassador	Resident in Addis Ababa.	
Bengt Rösiö	1966–1969	Resident	Chargé d'affaires (Note: Rösiö was chargé d'affaires with the diplomatic rank of embassy counselor.)		
Tord Hagen	1967–1969	Non-resident	Ambassador	Resident in Cairo.	
Democratic Republic of (the) Sudan (1969–1985)
Tord Hagen	1969–1972	Non-resident	Ambassador	Resident in Cairo.	
Lars von Celsing	1972–1976	Non-resident	Ambassador	Resident in Cairo.	
Axel Edelstam	1976–1981	Non-resident	Ambassador	Resident in Cairo.	
Olov Ternström	1981–1985	Non-resident	Ambassador	Resident in Cairo.	
Republic of the Sudan (1985–present)
Olov Ternström	1985–1986	Non-resident	Ambassador	Resident in Cairo.	
Lars-Olof Brilioth	1987–1990	Non-resident	Ambassador	Resident in Cairo.	
Jan Ståhl	1990–1995	Non-resident	Ambassador	Resident in Cairo.	
Christer Sylvén	1995–2000	Non-resident	Ambassador	Resident in Cairo.	
Sven Linder	2000–2003	Non-resident	Ambassador	Resident in Cairo.	
Stig Elvemar	2003–2004	Non-resident	Ambassador	Resident in Cairo.	
Håkan Åkesson	2004–2005	Non-resident	Ambassador	Resident in Addis Ababa. (Note: There are uncertainties regarding when Håkan Åkesson was accredited as ambassador to Khartoum. According to Sveriges statskalender (2005), he served as ambassador to Khartoum starting in 2002. However, Sveriges statskalender (2004) states that the Swedish ambassador to Cairo, Stig Elvemar, who was appointed in 2003, was accredited to Khartoum. That same edition also mentions that Håkan Åkesson was accredited to Khartoum from 2002. In Sveriges statskalender (2003), it is noted that the Swedish ambassador to, Sven Linder, was also accredited to Khartoum. In the same edition, it is stated that Håkan Åkesson only held a dual accreditation to Djibouti from 2002 and not to Khartoum.)	
Staffan Tillander	2005–2008	Non-resident	Ambassador	Resident in Addis Ababa.	
Jan Sadek	2008–2013	Resident	Ambassador		
Mette Sunnergren	2013–2016	Resident	Ambassador	Also accredited to Bangui.	
Hans Henric Lundqvist	September 2016 – 2020	Resident	Ambassador		
Signe Burgstaller	September 2020 – 2023	Resident	Ambassador	Also accredited to Juba.	
Anna Block Mazoyer	October 2023 – 2025	Non-resident	Special envoy	Resident in Stockholm.	
Magnus Collett	2025–present	Non-resident	Special envoy	Resident in Stockholm.	
