= Axel Edelstam =

Swedish diplomat (1924–2012)

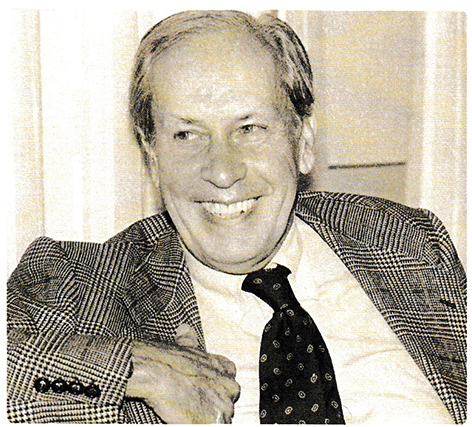
- Edelstam c. 1994
- Born: Ernst Axel Edelstam; 21 July 1924; Stockholm, Sweden
- Died: 17 August 2012 (aged 88); Stora Tuna, Sweden
- Education: Stockholm University College
- Occupation: Diplomat
- Years active: 1949–1994
- Spouse(s): Gloria Horstmann (m. 1947, divorced) Ingrid Salén (m. 1954, divorced) Mary Ann (m. 1989)
- Children: 3
- Relatives: Harald Edelstam (brother)

Ernst Axel Edelstam (21 July 1924 – 17 August 2012) was a Swedish diplomat. He served in the foreign service for almost 40 years, including as ambassador to many countries.

== Early life ==
Edelstam was born on 21 July 1924 in Stockholm, Sweden, the son of the permanent undersecretary and chamberlain Fabian Edelstam and Hilma (née Dickinson). He was the brother of diplomat Harald Edelstam. He passed studentexamen in 1944 and received a Candidate of Law degree in 1949 before becoming an attaché at the Ministry for Foreign Affairs the same year.

== Career ==
Edelstam served in New York City in 1950, Washington, D.C. in 1951, and at the Foreign Ministry in 1953. He was acting as second secretary in 1957 (temporarily in 1955) and as first legation secretary at the Organisation for European Economic Co-operation (OEEC) delegation in Paris from 1959 to 1961. Edelstam was the first secretary of the Foreign Ministry in 1961.

He was acting head of the disarmament delegation in Geneva in 1967 and held the position of ambassador from 1970. Edelstam was a foreign affairs councillor (Utrikdesråd) and acting head of the political department at the Foreign Ministry from 1972 to 1975 and was a member of the negotiating group from 1975 to 1976. He was ambassador in Cairo from 1976 to 1981 with concurrent accreditation to Nicosia (1976–1981), Khartoum (1976–1981), and Mogadishu (1980–1981). He was then ambassador in Bangkok, Vientiane, and Singapore from 1981 to 1983, and then in New Delhi from 1983 to 1987 with concurrent accreditation to Colombo, Kathmandu, and Thimphu (1985–1987). Edelstam's final post as ambassador was in Oslo from 1987 to 1989.

Edelstam was head of the Swedish Road Administration's international secretariat from 1989 to 1994. As retired, Edelstam was active as local, politician in Borlänge for the Liberal People's Party and was for a period chairman of the Swedish Pensioners' Association in Borlänge.

== Personal life ==
In 1947, Edelstam married Gloria Horstmann. They divorced, and in 1954, he married Ingrid Salén (born 1927), the daughter of law speaker Torsten Salén and Hilda Elfström. He was the father of Ellinor (born 1948), Torsten (born 1954), and Anne (born 1957). He later married the American Mary Ann. Edelstam was a frequent skier and had a great interest in cultural issues, foreign policy, history, and literature.

== Death ==
Edelstam died on 17 August 2012 in Stora Tuna, Borlänge Municipality, Sweden. He was interred on 3 September 2012 in the family grave at Brännkyrka Cemetery in Brännkyrka in southern Stockholm.

== Awards and decorations ==
- (Sweden) For Zealous and Devoted Service of the Realm (22 August 1979)
- (Norway) Grand Cross of the Order of St. Olav (1989)

Diplomatic posts
| Preceded by Lars von Celsing | Ambassador of Sweden to Egypt; 1976–1981 | Succeeded by Olov Ternström |
| Preceded by Lars von Celsing | Ambassador of Sweden to Sudan; 1976–1981 | Succeeded by Olov Ternström |
| Preceded by Åke Jonsson | Ambassador of Sweden to Cyprus; 1976–1981 | Succeeded by Torsten Örn |
| Preceded by Lennart Eckerberg | Ambassador of Sweden to Somalia; 1980–1981 | Succeeded by Arne Fältheim |
| Preceded by Jean-Christophe Öberg | Ambassador of Sweden to Thailand; 1981–1983 | Succeeded by Nils-Olov Hasslev |
| Preceded by Jean-Christophe Öberg | Ambassador of Sweden to Laos; 1981–1983 | Succeeded by Nils-Olov Hasslev |
| Preceded by Jean-Christophe Öberg | Ambassador of Sweden to Singapore; 1981–1983 | Succeeded by Håkan Berggren |
| Preceded by Lennart Finnmark | Ambassador of Sweden to India; 1983–1987 | Succeeded by Örjan Berner |
| Preceded by Lennart Finnmark | Ambassador of Sweden to Sri Lanka; 1983–1987 | Succeeded by Örjan Berner |
| Preceded by Lennart Finnmark | Ambassador of Sweden to Nepal; 1983–1987 | Succeeded by Örjan Berner |
| Preceded by None | Ambassador of Sweden to Bhutan; 1985–1987 | Succeeded by Örjan Berner |
| Preceded by Love Kellberg | Ambassador of Sweden to Norway; 1987–1989 | Succeeded by Lennart Bodström |
