= List of ambassadors of Sweden to Singapore =

Ambassador of Sweden to Singapore
- Lesser coat of arms of the Kingdom of Sweden

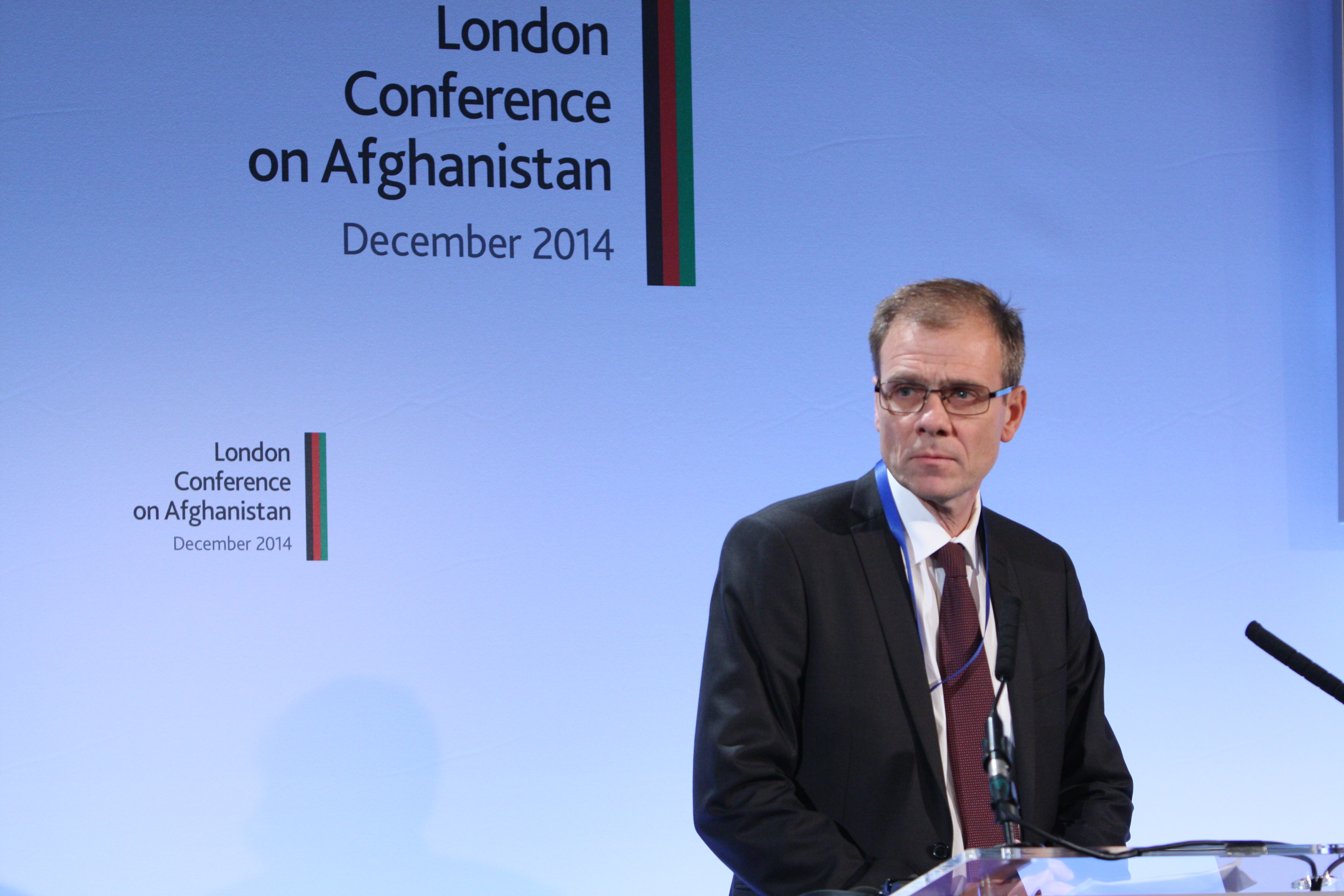
- Incumbent; Anders Sjöberg since 31 October 2023
- Ministry for Foreign Affairs; Swedish Embassy, Singapore
- Style: His or Her Excellency (formal); Mr. or Madam Ambassador (informal)
- Reports to: Minister for Foreign Affairs
- Residence: 39 Andrew Road
- Seat: Singapore
- Appointer: Government of Sweden
- Term length: No fixed term
- Inaugural holder: Åke Sjölin
- Formation: 1966
- Website: Swedish Embassy, Singapore

The Ambassador of Sweden to Singapore (known formally as the Ambassador of the Kingdom of Sweden to the Republic of Singapore) is the official representative of the government of Sweden to the president of Singapore and government of Singapore. Sweden has had a resident ambassador in Singapore since 1983. The Swedish ambassador in Singapore is also accredited as ambassador to Brunei.

== History ==
On the occasion of Singapore's declaration of independence in August 1965, Sweden's Prime Minister Tage Erlander stated in a congratulatory telegram to Prime Minister Lee Kuan Yew that the Swedish government recognized Singapore as a sovereign and independent state. Sweden established diplomatic relations with Singapore on 8 February 1966, six months after the signing of the Independence of Singapore Agreement, which declared Singapore an independent state. That same month, Sweden's ambassador to Bangkok, Åke Sjölin, was also appointed as ambassador to Singapore. On 23 April 1966, Sjölin presented his credentials in Singapore. Sweden's ambassador to Bangkok remained concurrently accredited to Singapore from 1966 until 1983.

Sweden had been represented in Singapore since the establishment of a Swedish honorary consulate on 25 May 1850. The honorary consulate was elevated to an honorary general consulate in 1970, before being closed in 1975. Despite having an unpaid honorary consul who served until the consulate general's closure in 1975, there was a Swedish career consul in Singapore between 1973 and 1976.

From 1974, a chargé d'affaires, who also served as an embassy counsellor, was based in Singapore. In 1982, this position was elevated to minister, and the following year, to ambassador. In 1983, the Swedish embassy received approval to appoint a resident ambassador to Singapore. The designated ambassador, Håkan Berggren, presented his credentials on 14 January.

Sweden established diplomatic relations with Brunei in 1984. Since then, the Swedish ambassador to Singapore has been concurrently accredited to Brunei.

== List of representatives ==
Name	Period	Title	Resident / Concurrent accreditation	Notes	Presented credentials	Ref
Åke Sjölin	1966–1967	Ambassador	Resident in Bangkok			
Axel Lewenhaupt	1967–1970	Ambassador	Resident in Bangkok			
Eric Virgin	1971–1976	Ambassador	Resident in Bangkok			
Sven E. Jonsson	1973–1976	Consul and chargé d'affaires		Chargé d'affaires from 1974.		
Jean-Christophe Öberg	1976–1981	Ambassador	Resident in Bangkok			
Rasmus Rasmusson	1976–1980	Chargé d'affaires ad interim (Note: Chargé d'affaires ad interim with the diplomatic rank of first embassy secretary (1976–1977) and counsellor (1977–1980).)				
Håkan Berggren	1980–1982	Chargé d'affaires ad interim (Note: Chargé d'affaires ad interim with the diplomatic rank of counsellor.)				
Axel Edelstam	1981–1983	Ambassador	Resident in Bangkok			
Håkan Berggren	1982–1983	Minister				
Håkan Berggren	1983 (Note: Appointed in December 1982.)–1984	Ambassador	Also accredited to Brunei (from 1984)			
Arnold Willén	1985–1989	Ambassador	Also accredited to Brunei		4 February 1985	
Finn Bergstrand	1989–1995	Ambassador	Also accredited to Brunei			
Krister Isaksson	1995–1997	Ambassador	Also accredited to Brunei			
Eva Walder-Brundin	1998–2002	Ambassador	Also accredited to Brunei			
Teppo Tauriainen	2002–2006	Ambassador	Also accredited to Brunei			
Pär Ahlberger	2006–2010	Ambassador	Also accredited to Brunei			
Ingemar Dolfe	2010–2013	Ambassador	Also accredited to Brunei (from 21 January 2012)			
Håkan Jevrell	2013–2018	Ambassador	Also accredited to Brunei		30 October 2013	
Niclas Kvarnström	1 September 2018 – 2021	Ambassador	Also accredited to Brunei (from 29 April 2019)			
Harald Fries	15 August 2021 – 9 January 2022	Chargé d'affaires				
Kent Härstedt	January 2022 – 2023	Ambassador	Also accredited to Brunei (from 16 April 2022)	Political appointee (non-career diplomat)		
Jenny Egermark	2023–2023	Chargé d'affaires ad interim	Also accredited to Brunei (from 27 July 2020)			
Anders Sjöberg	31 October 2023 – present	Ambassador	Also accredited to Brunei (from May 2025)		31 October 2023	
