= Tord Hagen =

Swedish diplomat (1914–2008)

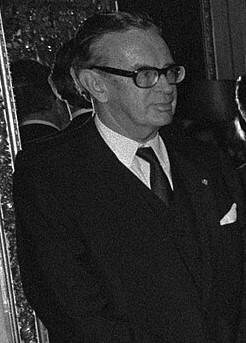
- Hagen in October 1976
- Born: Tord Bernhard Hagen; 19 January 1914; Uppsala, Sweden
- Died: 13 March 2008 (aged 94); Djursholm, Sweden
- Other name: "Bill"
- Education: Uppsala University
- Occupation: Diplomat
- Years active: 1938–1994
- Spouse(s): Lena Berg (m. 1937; div. 1964) Inga Lyrholm (m. 1966)
- Children: 3, including Cecilia Hagen
- Relatives: Ellen Hagen (mother); Frida Stéenhoff (aunt); Jonatan Unge (grandson)

Tord Bernhard Hagen (19 January 1914 – 13 March 2008) was a Swedish diplomat who had a long career in the Swedish Ministry for Foreign Affairs. After joining the ministry in 1938, he served in early postings in Dublin and London before advancing through senior positions in Europe during the 1940s and 1950s, including in Ankara, Prague, Bonn, Luxembourg, and as head of Sweden's GATT delegation. He became ambassador in 1959, first to Thailand and concurrently to several Southeast Asian countries. He later held major posts in Cairo, The Hague, and Copenhagen, and also represented Sweden at the United Nations on several occasions. In the 1960s, he headed Sweden's international aid affairs at the Foreign Ministry. After retiring from diplomacy in 1980, he worked as a consultant for Volvo until 1994 and later published his memoirs in 2000.

== Early life and education ==
Hagen was born on 19 January 1914 in Uppsala, Sweden, the son of County Governor Robert Hagen (1868–1922) and his wife, the suffragist, women's rights activist, and politician Ellen Hagen (née Wadström). His maternal grandfather was the priest, author, and collector Bernhard Wadström (1831–1918), and his great-grandfather on his mother's side was the civil servant, poet, and translator Carl Gustaf Wadström (1787–1841). His aunt was the writer and women's rights activist Frida Stéenhoff (1865–1945). He also had an older sister, Helga (1904–1968).

Hagen completed his studentexamen in Djursholm in 1931, earned a Bachelor of Arts degree from Uppsala University in 1934, and received a Candidate of Law degree in 1937. During his years at university, he acquired the nickname "Bill," after the cat character in Peter-No-Tail by Gösta Knutsson; the character "Bull" referred to his future Foreign Ministry colleague Olof Rydbeck.

== Career ==
After graduating from university, Hagen pursued a diplomatic career by joining the Swedish Ministry for Foreign Affairs as an attaché in 1938. He served in Dublin in 1939 and later the same year in London. In 1943 he became acting second secretary at the Ministry for Foreign Affairs, was formally appointed second secretary in 1944, and became an extra first secretary in 1946. He served as acting first legation secretary in Ankara in 1946 and was formally appointed in 1948. The same year, he became first embassy secretary in Prague. Hagen was appointed first secretary at the Ministry for Foreign Affairs in 1951, first embassy secretary in Bonn in 1953, and permanent representative with the rank of legation councillor to the delegation at the European Coal and Steel Community in Luxembourg in 1956. He became trade counsellor in Bonn in 1957, after serving in an acting capacity from 1956, and chaired the Swedish delegation to the General Agreement on Tariffs and Trade (GATT) from 1957 to 1959.

Hagen received his first ambassadorial appointment when he was tasked with establishing a new Swedish embassy in Bangkok. He spent five years in Southeast Asia, serving as ambassador to Thailand from 1959 to 1964. At the same time, he was concurrently accredited as Sweden's first ambassador to Rangoon from 1959, to Saigon from 1960, and to Phnom Penh from 1961. He also served as deputy representative to the United Nations General Assembly in 1963.

In 1964, Hagen became director-general (utrikesråd) and head of international aid affairs at the Ministry for Foreign Affairs. He was appointed ambassador to Cairo in 1966, with concurrent accreditation to Khartoum and Mogadishu in 1967. During his time in Egypt, he witnessed, among other events, the death and state funeral of Gamal Abdel Nasser.

Hagen served as ambassador to The Hague from 1972 to 1977. On 25 March 1974, Dutch police announced that they had uncovered a conspiracy to kidnap him. The plan was to hold Hagen hostage in order to force the release of the West German drug smuggler Karl Pauksch from Kumla Prison in Sweden. The extortion plot had become known to authorities two to three weeks earlier, and Hagen was periodically placed under special protection by Dutch police. During his posting in the Netherlands, he also managed the state visit of Carl XVI Gustaf in October 1976 and dealt with the aftermath of the Hotel Polen fire in May 1977, in which many Swedes lost their lives.

He later served as ambassador to Copenhagen from 1977 to 1980 and again as deputy representative to the United Nations General Assembly in 1980. From 1980 to 1994, he worked as a consultant for Volvo International Development Corporation. After completing his work with Volvo, Hagen began writing his memoirs, which resulted in the 2000 publication of Ett liv i krig och fred: en diplomats minnen ("A Life in War and Peace: Memoirs of a Diplomat").

In June 1995, Hagen appeared in the BBC2 documentary Myths and Memories of World War II, discussing the possibility of a peace treaty between Britain and Germany in 1940.

== Personal life ==
From 1937 to 1964, Hagen was married to Lena Berg (born 1913), daughter of the archivist Tor Berg and Greta Bonnier. They had two children: Robert (1944–1991) and Cecilia (born 1946).

In 1966, Hagen married his second wife Inga Lyrholm, the daughter of Torsten Lyrholm and Stina (née Klintberg). They had one son (born 1969).

== Death ==
Hagen died on 13 March 2008 in Djursholm. The funeral service was held on 16 April 2008 in Danderyd Church in Danderyd. He was interred on 30 May 2008 at the Uppsala Old Cemetery in his hometown of Uppsala.

== Awards and decorations ==
=== Swedish ===
- (Sweden) Commander 1st Class of the Order of the Polar Star (6 June 1972)
- (Sweden) Commander of the Order of the Polar Star (11 November 1966)
- (Sweden) Knight of the Order of the Polar Star (1959)

=== Foreign ===
- (Thailand) Grand Cross of the Order of the White Elephant (September 1960)
- (West Germany) Commander of the Order of Merit of the Federal Republic of Germany
- (Brazil) Officer of the Order of the Southern Cross
- Knight 1st Class of the Order of the White Rose of Finland
- (Norway) Knight 1st Class of the Order of St. Olav
- (Japan) Knight of the Order of the Rising Sun

== Bibliography ==
- Hagen, Tord (2000). Ett liv i krig och fred: en diplomats minnen [A life in war and peace: memoirs of a diplomat] (in Swedish). Stockholm: Carlsson. ISBN 9172039647. SELIBR 7622532.

Diplomatic posts
Preceded by Klas Böök	Ambassador of Sweden to Thailand; 1959–1964	Succeeded by Åke Sjölin
Preceded by Alva Myrdal	Ambassador of Sweden to Burma; 1959–1964	Succeeded by Åke Sjölin
Preceded by None	Ambassador of Sweden to South Vietnam; 1960–1964	Succeeded by Åke Sjölin
Preceded by None	Ambassador of Sweden to Cambodia; 1961–1964	Succeeded by Lennart Petri
Preceded by Adolf Croneborg	Ambassador of Sweden to Egypt; 1966–1972	Succeeded by Lars von Celsing
Preceded by Erland Kleen	Ambassador of Sweden to Sudan; 1967–1972	Succeeded by Lars von Celsing
Preceded by Adolf Croneborg	Ambassador of Sweden to Somalia; 1967–1970	Succeeded by Sven Fredrik Hedin
Preceded by Karl-Gustav Lagerfelt	Ambassador of Sweden to the Netherlands; 1972–1977	Succeeded by Nils-Olov Hasslev
Preceded by Hubert de Bèsche	Ambassador of Sweden to Denmark; 1977–1980	Succeeded by Carl Swartz
