= List of ambassadors of Sweden to Vietnam =

Ambassador of Sweden to Vietnam
- Lesser coat of arms of the Kingdom of Sweden
- Incumbent; Johan Ndisi since 2024
- Ministry for Foreign Affairs; Swedish Embassy, Hanoi
- Style: His or Her Excellency (formal); Mr. or Madam Ambassador (informal)
- Reports to: Minister for Foreign Affairs
- Residence: 10 Dang Thai Mai, Tây Hồ (Note: The residence is located at 10 Dang Thai Mai in the Quảng An ward of the Tây Hồ district. The previous residence was situated at 2 Nui Truc Street in the Ba Đình district, on the same property as the chancery.)
- Seat: Hanoi, Vietnam
- Appointer: Government of Sweden
- Term length: No fixed term
- Inaugural holder: Tord Hagen
- Formation: 28 October 1960
- Website: Swedish Embassy, Hanoi

The Ambassador of Sweden to Vietnam (known formally as the Ambassador of the Kingdom of Sweden to the Socialist Republic of Vietnam) is the official representative of the government of Sweden to the president of Vietnam and government of Vietnam.

== History ==
Sweden recognized South Vietnam as a state in 1957, when it voted in favor of South Vietnam's admission to the United Nations. In October 1960, an agreement was reached to establish diplomatic relations between Sweden and Vietnam. The Swedish Ambassador to Thailand, Tord Hagen, based in Bangkok, was also appointed ambassador to Saigon. On 28 October, Hagen received his appointment as ambassador to Saigon, Vietnam, and on 19 November of the same year, he presented his credentials to President Ngo Dinh Diem.

In April 1967, Sweden's Minister for Foreign Affairs, Torsten Nilsson, announced that Sweden would not appoint a new ambassador to South Vietnam after the departure of Ambassador Åke Sjölin. This decision was intended as a signal of Sweden's revised stance toward the regime in Saigon. By taking this step, the foreign minister argued, Sweden would establish more balanced diplomatic relations with the two Vietnamese states.

On 10 January 1969, the Swedish government decided to grant diplomatic recognition to North Vietnam. The Swedish Ambassador to China, Lennart Petri, based in Beijing, was initially considered for accreditation to Hanoi, as he had previously managed relations with the city. However, a week later, Arne Björnberg was appointed as the new ambassador to Beijing, with concurrent accreditation to Hanoi. On 21 April 1969, Ambassador Björnberg presented his credentials to Vice President Tôn Đức Thắng.

On 29 June 1970, Jean-Christophe Öberg was appointed chargé d'affaires ad interim in Hanoi. In 1972, he was appointed ambassador, and in June of the same year, he presented his credentials to Vice President Nguyễn Lương Bằng in Hanoi.

In August 1975, Sweden's ambassador to Hanoi, Bo Kjellén, was also appointed ambassador to Saigon. Kjellén remained based in Hanoi and was concurrently accredited to Saigon. On 8 September 1975, he presented his credentials to Nguyễn Hữu Thọ, Chairman of Consultative Council of the Provisional Revolutionary Government. Sweden had not had an ambassador accredited to Saigon since April 1967, when Ambassador Åke Sjölin, who was based in Bangkok and concurrently accredited to Saigon, returned home.

== List of representatives ==
Name	Period	Title	Notes	Presented credentials	Ref
Tord Hagen	28 October 1960 – 1964	Ambassador	Accredited to Saigon while resident in Bangkok.	19 November 1960	
Åke Sjölin	1964–1967	Ambassador	Accredited to Saigon while resident in Bangkok.		
–	1967–1969	Ambassador	Vacant		
Arne Björnberg	1969–1972	Ambassador	Accredited to Hanoi while resident in Beijing.		
Kaj Falkman	1971–1971	Chargé d'affaires ad interim			
Jean-Christophe Öberg	1971 (Note: One source states 1970 and another 1971.)–1972	Chargé d'affaires (Note: Held the diplomatic rank of embassy counselor.)			
Jean-Christophe Öberg	1972–1974	Ambassador			
Bo Kjellén	1974–1977	Ambassador	Also accredited to Saigon (from 1975).		
Tom Tscherning	1977–1980	Ambassador			
Ragnar Dromberg	1980–1984	Ambassador			
Carl-Erhard Lindahl	1985–1989	Ambassador			
Birgitta Johansson	1989–1991	Ambassador			
Mats Åberg	1991–1994	Ambassador			
Börje Ljunggren	1994–1997	Ambassador			
Gösta Edgren	1997–2000	Ambassador			
Marie Sjölander	2000–2003	Ambassador			
Anna Lindstedt	2003–2006	Ambassador			
Rolf Bergman	2006–2010	Ambassador			
Staffan Herrström	2010–2011	Ambassador		4 October 2010	
Gunnar Klinga	?–2012	Chargé d'affaires ad interim			
Camilla Mellander	2012–2016	Ambassador			
Pereric Högberg	1 September 2016 – 2019	Ambassador			
Ann Måwe	1 September 2019 – 2024	Ambassador			
Johan Ndisi	2024–present	Ambassador			
