= Arne Björnberg =

Swedish diplomat (1908–1983)

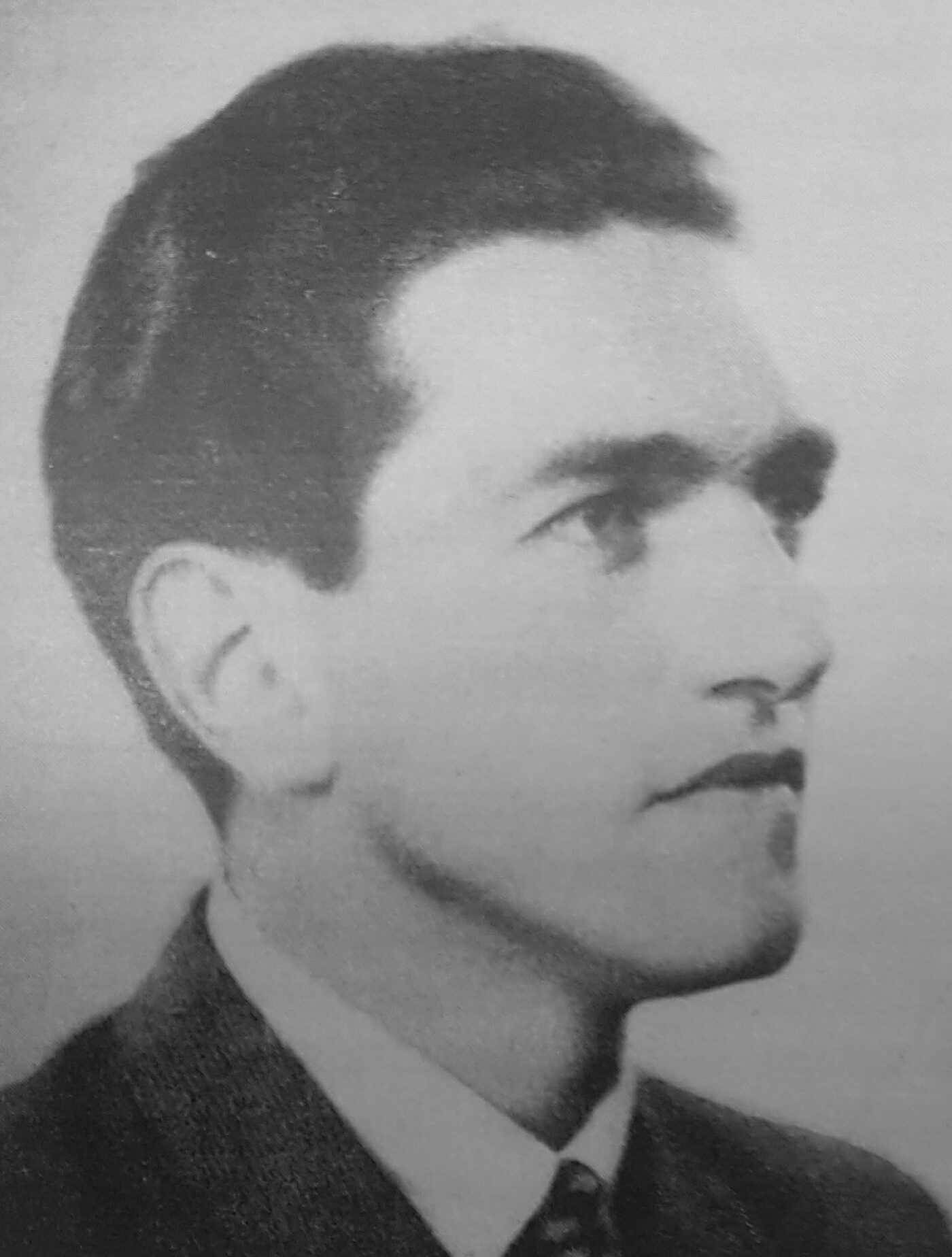
- Born: Berndt Arne Björnberg; 4 October 1908; Vårfrukyrka, Sweden
- Died: 1 August 1983 (aged 74); Stockholm, Sweden
- Education: Uppsala University
- Occupation: Diplomat
- Years active: 1939–1974
- Spouse(s): Majt Spärr (m. 1936; died 1960) Märta Beckman (m. 1963)
- Children: 3

Berndt Arne Björnberg (4 October 1908 – 1 August 1983) was a Swedish diplomat and international civil servant. Born in Uppsala County, he earned his doctorate in political science at Uppsala University in 1940 with a dissertation on Norwegian parliamentarism. He began his career in Swedish government service during the Second World War, working in the Ministry of Finance, the Ministry of Commerce and Industry, and the Commission for Economic Postwar Planning. Active in international affairs, he represented Sweden at the International Labour Organization and held leading roles in the United Nations Association of Sweden and UNESCO.

From the late 1940s he combined work in journalism and publishing with posts at the United Nations, serving in New York City as head of the European Section of the United Nations Department of Public Information, and later as a UN technical assistance expert in Bolivia, Tunisia, and Colombia. He returned to Sweden as Director General of the Swedish Agency for International Assistance (1962–1964).

Björnberg went on to serve as Swedish ambassador in Guatemala (1964–1969), with dual accreditation to several Central American states, and in Beijing (1969–1974), also accredited to Phnom Penh and Hanoi. In 1973, after Sweden became the first Western European country to recognize North Korea, he was appointed Sweden’s first ambassador in Pyongyang. He retired in 1974.

== Early life ==
Björnberg was born on 4 October 1908, in Vårfrukyrka Parish, in Enköping Municipality, Uppsala County, Sweden, the son of the farmer Eric Björnberg and his wife Nanna (née Lyberg). He received a Bachelor of Arts degree from Uppsala University in 1930 and a Licentiate of Philosophy degree in 1938. In 1940, he earned a Doctor of Philosophy degree at Uppsala University with a dissertation on "The Development of Parliamentarianism in Norway after 1905."

== Career ==
Björnberg began his career as first actuary at the National Swedish Foodstuffs Commission (Statens livsmedelskommission) in 1941, having joined the commission in 1939. He became acting section chief in 1942, an expert at the Ministry of Finance in 1943, and secretary of the Commission for Economic Postwar Planning (Kommissionen för ekonomisk efterkrigsplanering) from 1944 to 1945. Between 1945 and 1947 he served as special rapporteur at the Ministry of Commerce and Industry. During the same period, he represented the Swedish government at the International Labour Organization in 1945 and 1946, chairing the Swedish delegation in Seattle in 1946. That year he also chaired the Seamen’s Committee and the Dock Workers’ Inquiry. In addition, he was active in the Stockholm Social Democratic Association (1945–1947), the United Nations Association of Sweden (Svenska FN-föreningen) (1951–1956), and the Executive Committee of the World Federation of United Nations Associations (1951–1956). He also served on the working committee of the Central Committee for Swedish Technical Assistance to Less Developed Areas (Centralkommittén för svenskt tekniskt bistånd till mindre utvecklade områden) (1953–1956) and was a member of UNESCO’s Advisory Commission for Adult Education from 1955 to 1956.

From 1926 to 1934, he worked as Uppsala correspondent for Dagens Nyheter. He later became editor of Tiden (1945–1947), head of the European Section at the United Nations Department of Public Information in New York City (1947–1949), and managing director and publishing manager at Tidens förlag (1949–1955). During the same years, he sat on the boards of AB Folket i Bild (1949–1955) and Bokförlags AB Tiden (1950–1955), and he was engaged with the Swedish Institute of International Affairs from 1949 and the Swedish-American News Agency (1951–1956). From 1956 to 1959 he served as chief expert for the UN’s technical assistance program in Bolivia, followed by work as the United Nations High Commissioner for Refugees’ representative in Tunisia (1959–1960) and as a UN expert in Colombia (1960–1961). Between 1962 and 1964 he was Director General of the Swedish Agency for International Assistance (Nämnden för internationellt bistånd, Nib). He was then appointed ambassador in Guatemala City (1964–1969), with concurrent accreditation in Managua, San José, San Salvador, and Tegucigalpa. From 1969 to 1974 he served as ambassador in Beijing, with side accreditation in Phnom Penh (1969-1974) and Hanoi (1969–1972).

After Sweden became the first Western European country to recognize North Korea in April 1973, Björnberg was accredited as Sweden’s first ambassador to Pyongyang. He presented his credentials to President Kim Il Sung on 24 May 1973, becoming the very first diplomat to do so after Kim assumed the presidency the year before.

== Personal life ==
In 1939, Björnberg married Majt Spärr (1912–1960), the daughter of civil engineer Lars Spärr and Ragna (née Holm). In 1963, he remarried Märta Beckman (1918–2005), the daughter of Captain Einar Beckman and Ellen (née Rudling).

He had three children: Lars, a desk officer (departementssekreterare); Anders, a teacher; and Ann-Christin, a social worker.

== Death ==
Björnberg died on 1 August 1983 in Stockholm, Sweden. The funeral service was held on 11 August 1983 i Nacka Church in Nacka, Stockholm County. He is interred at Nacka Northern Cemetery.

== Bibliography ==
- Björnberg, Arne (1939). Parlamentarismens utveckling i Norge efter 1905 [The development of parliamentarism in Norway after 1905]. Skrifter utgivna av Statsvetenskapliga föreningen i Uppsala, 0346-7538 ; 10 (in Swedish). Uppsala: Almqvist & Wiksell [distributör]. SELIBR 402015.
- Björnberg, Arne (1941). Norge under ockupationen [Norway during the occupation]. Världspolitikens dagsfrågor, 0042-2754 ; [1941:9] (in Swedish). Stockholm: Utrikespolitiska institutet. SELIBR 8213483.
- Björnberg, Arne, ed. (1942). Norge - broderland: tolv uppsatser [Norway - brotherly country: twelve essays] (in Swedish). Uppsala. SELIBR 273049.
- Björnberg, Arne (1944). Svensk krishushållning [Swedish crisis management]. Studentföreningen Verdandis småskrifter, 99-0470915-7 ; 463 (in Swedish). Stockholm: Bonnier. SELIBR 793199.
- Tegen, Einar; Myrdal, Alva; Leijonhufvud, Erik; Björnberg, Arne, eds. (1945). Sverige och uppbyggnadsarbetet [Sweden and the reconstruction work]. Kulturell uppbyggnad ; 1 (in Swedish). Stockholm: Kooperativa förbundets bokförlag. SELIBR 1235051.
- Björnberg, Arne, ed. (1946). Hur Sverige ordnade folkförsörjningen under andra världskriget: männen och kvinnorna bakom verket [How Sweden organized the population during World War II: the men and women behind the work] (in Swedish). Stockholm: Igo-förl. SELIBR 1407965.
- Björnberg, Arne (1949). Förenta nationerna och världsfreden [The United Nations and World Peace] (in Swedish). Stockholm: Svenska bokförlaget. SELIBR 890427.
- Björnberg, Arne (1955). FN under 10 år: program och verklighet [The UN in 10 years: program and reality]. Världspolitikens dagsfrågor, 0042-2754 ; 1955:9 (in Swedish). Stockholm: Utrikespolitiska institutet. SELIBR 805271.
- Björnberg, Arne (1956). FN: en handbok [The United Nations: a handbook]. Internationell politik, 99-0139315-9 ; 32 (in Swedish). Stockholm: Kooperativa förbundet. SELIBR 875793.
- Björnberg, Arne (1959). Las poblaciones indígenas y el cooperativismo: observaciones y experiencias del desarrollo del programa Andino en Bolivia [Indigenous populations and cooperativism: observations and experiences from the development of the Andean program in Bolivia] (in Spanish). Stockholm: Ibero-amerikanska bibl. SELIBR 755136.
- Björnberg, Arne (1964). U-landslag: utredning och förslag ang. s.k. frivilligtjänst inom svensk biståndsverksamhet [Developing countries: investigation and proposals regarding so-called voluntary service within Swedish aid activities]. [UD] ; [1964:2?] (in Swedish). [Stockholm]: [Arne Björnberg]. SELIBR 1274749.
- Björnberg, Arne (1968). Nya indianboken: Inkas ättlingar i dagens kamp för tillvaron [The New Indian Book: Inca Descendants in Today's Struggle for Existence] (in Swedish). Stockholm: Raben & Sjögren. SELIBR 1274744.
- Björnberg, Arne (1971). YK-käsikirja [UN Handbook] (in Finnish). Helsinki: Weilin & Göös. SELIBR 77035.
- Björnberg, Arne (1975). Stormakten Kina i närbild [The superpower China in close-up] (in Swedish). Stockholm: Bonnier. ISBN 9100404055. SELIBR 7144767.
- Björnberg, Arne (1976). Stormagten Kina i nærbillede [The superpower China in close-up] (in Danish). Copenhagen: Gyldendal. ISBN 87-01-31511-0. SELIBR 7195225.

Government offices
Preceded by None	Director General of the Swedish Agency for International Assistance; 1962–1964	Succeeded by Ernst Michanek
Diplomatic posts
Preceded by Tord Göransson	Ambassador of Sweden to Guatemala; 1964–1969	Succeeded by Harald Edelstam
Preceded by Tord Göransson	Ambassador of Sweden to Costa Rica; 1964–1969	Succeeded by Harald Edelstam
Preceded by Tord Göransson	Ambassador of Sweden to El Salvador; 1964–1969	Succeeded by Harald Edelstam
Preceded by Tord Göransson	Ambassador of Sweden to Honduras; 1964–1969	Succeeded by Harald Edelstam
Preceded by Tord Göransson	Ambassador of Sweden to Nicaragua; 1964–1969	Succeeded by Harald Edelstam
Preceded by Lennart Petri	Ambassador of Sweden to China; 1969–1974	Succeeded by Kaj Björk
Preceded by Lennart Petri	Ambassador of Sweden to Cambodia; 1969–1974	Succeeded by Kaj Björk
Preceded by Åke Sjölin as Ambassador to South Vietnam	Ambassador of Sweden to North Vietnam; 1969–1972	Succeeded by Jean-Christophe Öberg
Preceded by None	Ambassador of Sweden to North Korea; 1973–1974	Succeeded by Kaj Björk
