= Lennart Finnmark =

Swedish diplomat

- Born: Tor Lennart Finnmark; 18 January 1917; Gothenburg, Sweden
- Died: 2 September 1993 (aged 76); Täby, Sweden
- Education: Lund University
- Occupation: Diplomat
- Years active: 1940–1983
- Spouse: Britt Nilsson (m. 1953)

Tor Lennart Finnmark (18 January 1917 – 2 September 1993) was a Swedish diplomat.

== Early life ==
Finnmark was born on 18 January 1917 in Gothenburg, Sweden, the son of Frithiof Finnmark, a pharmacist, and his wife Signe (née Lindberg). He passed his studentexamen in 1936 and received a Candidate of Law degree from Lund University in 1940. Finnmark became an attaché at the Ministry for Foreign Affairs in 1940.

== Career ==
Finnmark served in Madrid in 1941, at the consulate general in London in 1942, at the embassy in London in 1943 and was acting second legation secretary in 1946. He served in Moscow in 1947 and was back serving at the Foreign Ministry in 1948 and then in Moscow again in 1948. Finnmark became extra first secretary in 1949. Finnmark then served at the Organisation for European Economic Co-operation (OEEC) in Paris in 1949, was extraordinary first secretary in 1952 and extraordinary first secretary with embassy counsellor's position at the delegation of the European Coal and Steel Community in Luxembourg in 1952. He became first secretary in 1956 and served at the United Nations Secretariat in New York City from 1956 to 1958 and was acting embassy counsellor in Paris from 1958 to 1961.

He served in Moscow from 1961 to 1964, had minister's position in 1963, was ambassador in Karachi and Rawalpindi from 1964 to 1969, Belgrade and Tirana from 1969 to 1975, New Delhi and Dhaka from 1975 to 1977 as well as Colombo and Kathmandu from 1975 to 1983. He also served as a mediator in the Neutral Nations Supervisory Commission in Korea in 1968. Finnmark was sent to Korea to try and resolve the crisis over the North Korean capture of the United States Navy intelligence ship, the USS Pueblo.

Finnmark was secretary representative and chairman of bilateral trade negotiations and representative at the General Agreement on Tariffs and Trade (GATT) and the United Nations Economic Commission for Europe (ECE) in Geneva in 1947 and was chairman in aid policy negotiations with India and Pakistan in 1964.

== Personal life ==
In 1953, Finnmark married Britt Nilsson (born 1922), daughter of Fritjof Nilsson and Signe (née Göransson).

== Death ==
Finnmark died on 2 September 1993 in Täby, Sweden and was buried at Djursholm cemetery.

== Awards and decorations ==
- (Sweden) Knight of the Order of the Polar Star
- (Spain) Knight's Cross of the Order of Civil Merit

Diplomatic posts
Preceded by None	Permanent Representative of Sweden to the High Authority of the European Coal and Steel Community; 1952–1956	Succeeded by Karl-Gustav Lagerfelt
Preceded by Hugo Ärnfast	Ambassador of Sweden to Pakistan; 1964–1969	Succeeded by Bengt Odhner
Preceded by Agda Rössel	Ambassador of Sweden to Yugoslavia; 1969–1975	Succeeded by Axel Lewenhaupt
Preceded by None	Ambassador of Sweden to Albania; 1969–1975	Succeeded by Axel Lewenhaupt
Preceded by Axel Lewenhaupt	Ambassador of Sweden to India; 1975–1983	Succeeded by Axel Edelstam
Preceded by Axel Lewenhaupt	Ambassador of Sweden to Sri Lanka; 1975–1983	Succeeded by Axel Edelstam
Preceded by Axel Lewenhaupt	Ambassador of Sweden to Nepal; 1975–1983	Succeeded by Axel Edelstam
Preceded by Axel Lewenhaupt	Ambassador of Sweden to Bangladesh; 1975–1977	Succeeded by Arne Lellki
