= List of ambassadors of Sweden to Laos =

Ambassador of Sweden to Laos
- Lesser coat of arms of the Kingdom of Sweden
- Incumbent; Anna Hammargren since 2023
- Ministry for Foreign Affairs; Swedish Embassy, Vientiane
- Style: His or Her Excellency (formal); Mr. or Madam Ambassador (informal)
- Reports to: Minister for Foreign Affairs
- Seat: Bangkok, Thailand (Note: Sweden’s ambassador in Bangkok is co-accredited in Vientiane.)
- Appointer: Government of Sweden
- Term length: No fixed term
- Inaugural holder: Åke Sjölin
- Formation: 15 January 1965

The Ambassador of Sweden to Laos (known formally as the Ambassador of the Kingdom of Sweden to the Lao People's Democratic Republic) is the official representative of the government of Sweden to the president of Laos and government of Laos. Since Sweden does not have an embassy in Vientiane, Sweden's ambassador in Bangkok is co-accredited in Vientiane.

== History ==
Sweden established diplomatic relations with Laos on 10 October 1964. After an agreement was reached between Sweden and Laos to establish diplomatic relations at the embassy level, the ambassador in Bangkok, Thailand, Åke Sjölin, was appointed on 15 January 1965 as ambassador also to Vientiane.

In 1978, Sweden opened an aid office in Vientiane, which also functioned as an embassy office. Between 1981 and 1987, the embassy office (also referred to as the embassy) was headed by a diplomat seconded from the Ministry for Foreign Affairs, serving as head of mission and chargé d'affaires ad interim while the ambassador, who was resident in Bangkok, was absent. During the periods 1978–1980 and 1987–2008, the head of the aid office, employed by the Swedish International Development Cooperation Agency (Sida), served as head of mission and chargé d'affaires ad interim. The head of the aid office held the diplomatic rank of counsellor.

The embassy was closed on 15 August 2008 as the Swedish government decided to phase out bilateral development assistance to Laos. A section office was established under Sida's auspices during 2008–2010, and was gradually wound down as development cooperation there was phased out.

== List of representatives ==
Name	Period	Resident/Non resident	Title	Notes	Presented credentials	Ref
Kingdom of Laos (1947–1975)
Åke Sjölin	1965–1967	Non-resident	Ambassador	Resident in Bangkok		
Axel Lewenhaupt	1968–1970	Non-resident	Ambassador	Resident in Bangkok		
Eric Virgin	1971–1976	Non-resident	Ambassador	Resident in Bangkok		
Lao People's Democratic Republic (1975–present)
Jean-Christophe Öberg	1976–1981	Non-resident	Ambassador	Resident in Bangkok		
Börje Ljunggren	1978–1980	Resident	Chargé d'affaires ad interim (Note: With diplomatic rank of air attaché (biståndsattaché).)			
Axel Edelstam	1981–1982	Non-resident	Ambassador	Resident in Bangkok		
Mats Åberg	1981–1983	Resident	Chargé d'affaires ad interim (Note: With diplomatic rank of embassy counselor.)			
Nils-Olov Hasslev	1983–1986	Non-resident	Ambassador	Resident in Bangkok		
Sten Ask	1984–1987	Resident	Chargé d'affaires ad interim (Note: With diplomatic rank of minister.)			
Olov Ternström	1986–1992	Non-resident	Ambassador	Resident in Bangkok		
Per Kökeritz	1986–1992	Resident	Chargé d'affaires ad interim (Note: With diplomatic rank of embassy counselor.)			
Eva Heckscher	1993–1996	Non-resident	Ambassador	Resident in Bangkok		
Rolf Carlman	1993–1995	Resident	Chargé d'affaires ad interim (Note: With diplomatic rank of embassy counselor.)			
Olof Milton	1995–1999	Resident	Chargé d'affaires ad interim (Note: With diplomatic rank of embassy counselor.)			
Inga Eriksson Fogh	1997–1998	Non-resident	Ambassador	Resident in Bangkok		
–	1999–1999	Non-resident	Vacant			
Jan Axel Nordlander	2000–2004	Non-resident	Ambassador	Resident in Bangkok		
Christer Holtsberg	2000–2004	Resident	Chargé d'affaires ad interim (Note: With diplomatic rank of embassy counselor.)			
Jonas Hafström	2004–2007	Non-resident	Ambassador	Resident in Bangkok		
AnnLis Åberg	2004–2008	Resident	Chargé d'affaires ad interim			
Lennart Linnér	2007–2011	Non-resident	Ambassador	Resident in Bangkok		
Klas Molin	2011–2015	Non-resident	Ambassador	Resident in Bangkok		
Staffan Herrström	2015–2020	Non-resident	Ambassador	Resident in Bangkok		
Jon Åström Gröndahl	2020–2023	Non-resident	Ambassador	Resident in Bangkok		
Anna Hammargren	August 2023 – present	Non-resident	Ambassador	Resident in Bangkok	12 February 2024	
