= Jonas Hafström =

Swedish diplomat (born 1948)

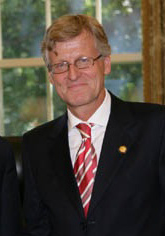

Ambassador of Sweden to the United States
- In office 2007–2013
- Preceded by: Gunnar Lund
- Succeeded by: Björn Lyrvall

Ambassador of Sweden to Thailand, Burma, Cambodia, and Laos
- In office 2004–2007
- Preceded by: Jan Nordlander
- Succeeded by: Lennart Linnér

Personal details
- Born: 27 February 1948 (age 78) Stockholm, Sweden
- Party: Moderate Party
- Education: Lund University

Sven Jonas Gerhardsson Hafström (born 27 February 1948) is a Swedish diplomat who was Sweden's Ambassador to the United States from 2007 to 2013.

== Biography ==
Jonas Hafström was born in Stockholm. He earned a LL.B. from Lund University in 1974. In 1975 he was also elected chairman of the student body at Lund University. From 1976 to 1979 he served as a district clerk at the district court in Nyköping, Sweden. In 1979 he was employed at the Swedish Ministry for Foreign Affairs in Stockholm and from 1979 to 1981 he served as press secretary to then minister for justice Håkan Winberg. From 1982 to 1984 he was first secretary at the Swedish embassy in Teheran, Iran, and from 1984 to 1987 he was first secretary at the Swedish embassy in Washington, D.C., United States. From 1987 to 1991, Hafström served as press secretary and foreign policy advisor to then chairman of the Moderate Party, Carl Bildt. During Bildt's tenure as Prime Minister of Sweden from 1991 to 1994, Hafström served as an assistant under-secretary and foreign policy advisor to Bildt.

From 1994 to 2000, Hafström was head of the International Bureau of the Moderate Party and foreign policy advisor to Carl Bildt. From 1998 to 1999 he was also a member of the Committee on Defence. From 2000 to 2004 he was deputy director-general and head of the Department for Consular Affairs and Civil Law at the Swedish Ministry for Foreign Affairs. From 2004 to 2007 he served as the Swedish ambassador in Bangkok, Thailand (as such he was also the Swedish ambassador to Burma, Cambodia, and Laos). As such he was noted for his efforts during the tsunami disaster on 26 December 2004, which affected many Swedish tourists in Thailand. On 29 January 2008 he was awarded H. M. The King's Medal (8th size) from King Carl XVI Gustaf of Sweden for his "meritorious efforts during the tsunami disaster in South East Asia". Since the autumn of 2007 to 2013, Hafström served as the Swedish ambassador in Washington, D.C. in the United States.

Since 1987, Hafström is a non-commissioned reserve captain in the Swedish Army.

Diplomatic posts
Preceded by Jan Nordlander	Ambassador of Sweden to Thailand; 2004–2007	Succeeded by Lennart Linnér
Preceded by Jan Nordlander	Ambassador of Sweden to Burma; 2004–2007	Succeeded by Lennart Linnér
Preceded by Jan Nordlander	Ambassador of Sweden to Cambodia; 2004–2007	Succeeded by Lennart Linnér
Preceded by Jan Nordlander	Ambassador of Sweden to Laos; 2004–2007	Succeeded by Lennart Linnér
Preceded by Gunnar Lund	Ambassador of Sweden to the United States; 2007–2013	Succeeded by Björn Lyrvall
