= Jean-Christophe Öberg =

Swedish diplomat (1935–1992)

- Born: Jean-Christophe Sébastien Öberg; 28 March 1935; Rouen, France
- Died: 12 June 1992 (aged 57); Stockholm, Sweden
- Education: Uppsala University
- Occupation: Diplomat
- Years active: 1961–1991
- Spouse: Birgit Bäcklund (m. 1959)
- Children: 4

Jean-Christophe Sébastien Öberg (28 March 1935 – 12 June 1992) was a Swedish diplomat. He served in the Swedish foreign service for 30 years, as ambassador in Vietnam (1972–1974), in Thailand, Laos and Singapore (1976–1981), in Algeria (1982–1987) and in Poland (1987–1991).

== Early life ==
Öberg was born on 28 March 1935 in Rouen, France. His father, Nils Konrad Öberg (1896–1974) came from a poor family in Nordingrå, Västernorrland County, Sweden, and emigrated to France and eventually became vice consul at the Swedish embassy in Paris. His mother was a Frenchwoman, Germaine (née Pernot). His father's side of the family is portrayed in the book Kära broder Konrad : en berättelse om en nordingråfamilj i början av 1900-talet (2002). During World War II, his parents helped Jews flee the Vichy government and its deportation measures.

Öberg received a Bachelor of Arts degree from Uppsala University in 1959 and a Candidate of Law degree in 1961.

== Career ==
Öberg became an attaché at the Ministry for Foreign Affairs in Stockholm in 1961 and then served in Jakarta, Manila and Kuala Lumpur from 1962 to 1963. He was embassy secretary in Bangkok, Saigon, Rangoon, Phnom Penh, Vientiane from 1964 to 1965. In 1965, Öberg returned to Stockholm for the next five years, he helped mediate between the United States and Hanoi. Öberg became an administrative officer at the Foreign Ministry in Stockholm in 1965, and desk officer there in 1967.

Öberg served as secretary to Minister for Foreign Affairs Torsten Nilsson from 1967 to 1970. In 1970, he opened the Swedish mission to the North Vietnam. Öberg served as chargé d'affaires in Hanoi from 1970 to 1972 and was then ambassador there from 1972 to 1974. He served as minister in Paris from 1974 to 1976 and as ambassador in Bangkok, as well as non-resident ambassador to Vientiane and Singapore from 1976 to 1981. He then became a fellow of the Weatherhead Center for International Affairs at Harvard University in the United States from 1981 to 1982 when he was appointed ambassador in Algiers. In 1987, Öberg was appointed ambassador in Warsaw, serving until 1991. He then became head of the Baltic Institute (Östersjöinstitutet) in Karlskrona. He died a year later.

== Personal life ==
In 1959, Öberg married Birgit Bäcklund (born 1936), the daughter of Olof Bäcklund and Brita (née Sahlberg).

Öberg had four children, including Nils Öberg (born 1960), Director General of the Swedish Social Insurance Agency since 2019.

== Bibliography ==
- Öberg, Jean-Christophe (1985). Varför Vietnam?: ett kapitel i svensk utrikespolitik 1965-1970 (in Swedish). Stockholm: Rabén & Sjögren. ISBN 9129572479. SELIBR 7235747.

Diplomatic posts
Preceded by Arne Björnberg	Ambassador of Sweden to Vietnam; 1972–1974	Succeeded by Bo Kjellén
Preceded by Eric Virgin	Ambassador of Sweden to Thailand; 1976–1981	Succeeded by Axel Edelstam
Preceded by Eric Virgin	Ambassador of Sweden to Laos; 1976–1981	Succeeded by Axel Edelstam
Preceded by Eric Virgin	Ambassador of Sweden to Singapore; 1976–1981	Succeeded by Axel Edelstam
Preceded by Stig Brattström	Ambassador of Sweden to Algeria; 1982–1987	Succeeded by Tom Tscherning
Preceded by Örjan Berner	Ambassador of Sweden to Poland; 1987–1991	Succeeded by Karl-Vilhelm Wöhler
