= Axel Lewenhaupt =

Swedish diplomat (1917–2018)

Count Axel Lewenhaupt
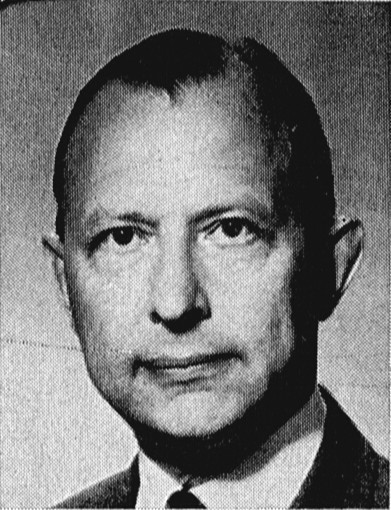
- Born: Axel Charles Emil Lewenhaupt; 27 May 1917; Helsingborg, Sweden
- Died: 20 November 2018 (aged 101); Stockholm, Sweden
- Resting place: Galärvarvskyrkogården
- Education: Uppsala University
- Occupation: Diplomat
- Years active: 1943–1988
- Spouse(s): Elsa Rudberg (m. 1944; died 1990) Louise Ehrensvärd (m. 1991; died 2014)
- Children: 2
- Relatives: C. A. Ehrensvärd (father in law)

Count Axel Charles Emil Lewenhaupt (27 May 1917 – 20 November 2018) was a Swedish diplomat. Lewenhaupt began his diplomatic career as an attaché in Rome in 1943, later serving in Berlin and Helsinki before holding posts in Stockholm and Madrid during the 1950s. He rose through the Ministry for Foreign Affairs as second secretary, first secretary, and director, while also representing Sweden in international trade negotiations.

In the following decades he held senior postings abroad, including counsellor in Washington, D.C., ambassador in Léopoldville, Bangkok, New Delhi, Belgrade, Rome, and Valletta, as well as permanent representative to the FAO. He also represented Sweden at the UN General Assembly in 1973. From 1983 to 1988, he concluded his public career as Grand Master of Ceremonies at the Royal Court of Sweden.

== Early life ==
Lewenhaupt was born on 27 May 1917 in Helsingborg, Sweden, the son of Colonel, Count Gustaf Lewenhaupt and his wife Baroness Elisabeth Ramel. He passed studentexamen in 1936 and his reserve officer exam in 1938 and received a Candidate of Law degree from Uppsala University in 1942 before becoming an attaché at the Ministry for Foreign Affairs in 1943.

== Career ==
=== Diplomatic career ===
Lewenhaupt began his diplomatic career as an attaché in Rome in 1943. During World War II, the Swedish legation in Rome took special measures to protect Swedish interests and nationals, including Elizabeth Hesselblad, who remained in the city. Particular efforts were directed towards safeguarding the Swedish Institute and the convent church of Santa Brigida.

In 1944, he served as attaché in Berlin, and from 1945 to 1947 he was stationed in Helsinki. He then returned to Stockholm, serving as second secretary at the Ministry for Foreign Affairs from 1948 to 1952. During this period, in 1951, he was also secretary of the Ministry’s admissions commission. From 1952 to 1956, Lewenhaupt was first secretary at the Swedish legation in Madrid, while also acting as Sweden's representative in trade negotiations with Spain, the Soviet Union and other nations between 1952 and 1958. He then held positions as first secretary (1956–1958) and director (1958–1960) at the Foreign Ministry.

He served as embassy counsellor in Washington, D.C. from 1960 to 1962, and as ambassador in Léopoldville from 1962 to 1963. He returned to Stockholm as acting head of the political department at the Foreign Ministry (1964–1965) and head of the administrative department (1965–1967). Lewenhaupt was ambassador in Bangkok, Rangoon, Kuala Lumpur and Singapore from 1967 to 1970, as well as Vientiane from 1968 to 1970, and ambassador in New Delhi, Colombo and Kathmandu from 1970 to 1975. During this period, he also represented Sweden at the United Nations General Assembly in 1973.

From 1975 to 1978, he was ambassador in Belgrade and Tirana, after which he served at the Foreign Ministry from 1978 to 1979. He then became ambassador in Rome and Valletta from 1979 to 1983, while also serving as Sweden’s permanent representative to the Food and Agriculture Organization (FAO) during the same years. From 1983 to 1988, he held the position of Grand Master of Ceremonies at the Royal Court of Sweden.

=== Other activities ===
Beyond his official postings, Lewenhaupt became a member of the Royal Automobile Club in 1956 and accompanied the Duke of Halland on his official visit to Ethiopia and Liberia in 1959.

== Personal life ==
In 1944, Lewenhaupt married Elsa Rudberg (1918–1990), the daughter of first accountant Ivar Rudberg and Sonja Bergström. He was the father of Anne (1946–2018) and Eva (born 1948). In 1991, he married Countess Louise Ehrensvärd (1925–2014), the daughter of the General, Count Carl August Ehrensvärd and Countess Gisela Bassewitz.

== Death ==
Lewenhaupt turned 100 on 27 May 2017 and died on 20 November 2018 at the age of 101. The funeral service was held on 19 December 2018 at Gustaf Adolf Church in Stockholm. He was interred on 3 July 2019 at Galärvarvskyrkogården in Stockholm.

== Awards and decorations ==
- (Sweden) Commander 1st Class of the Order of the Polar Star (3 December 1974)
- (Sweden) Knight of the Order of the Polar Star (1962)
- (Italy) Grand Cross of the Order of Merit of the Italian Republic (6 October 1983)
- (Spain) Commander of the Order of Civil Merit
- Knight of the Order of the White Rose of Finland
- Knight of the Order of the Crown of Italy
- Knight of the Order of Merit of the Republic of Hungary
- Grand Officer of the Order of the Star of Ethiopia
- (Iran) Commander of the Order of the Crown
- (Austria) Commander of the Order of Merit of the Austrian Republic
- (Sweden) Swedish Red Cross badge of merit in silver (Svenska Röda Korsets förtjänsttecken i silver)

== Bibliography ==
- Lewenhaupt, Axel (2002). Hågkomster: [från barn- och ungdomsåren samt tiden i utrikestjänsten och vid hovet] [Reminiscences: [from childhood and adolescence, as well as the time spent in the foreign service and at the court]] (in Swedish). Stockholm: A. Lewenhaupt. ISBN 91-973255-9-7. SELIBR 9132715.

Diplomatic posts
Preceded by None	Ambassador of Sweden to Republic of the Congo; 1962–1963	Succeeded by Dag Malm
Preceded by Åke Sjölin	Ambassador of Sweden to Thailand; 1967–1970	Succeeded by Eric Virgin
Preceded by Åke Sjölin	Ambassador of Sweden to Burma; 1967–1970	Succeeded by Eric Virgin
Preceded by Åke Sjölin	Ambassador of Sweden to Malaysia; 1967–1970	Succeeded by Eric Virgin
Preceded by Åke Sjölin	Ambassador of Sweden to Singapore; 1967–1970	Succeeded by Eric Virgin
Preceded by Åke Sjölin	Ambassador of Sweden to Laos; 1968–1970	Succeeded by Eric Virgin
Preceded by Gunnar Heckscher	Ambassador of Sweden to India; 1970–1975	Succeeded by Lennart Finnmark
Preceded by Gunnar Heckscher	Ambassador of Sweden to Sri Lanka; 1970–1975	Succeeded by Lennart Finnmark
Preceded by Gunnar Heckscher	Ambassador of Sweden to Nepal; 1970–1975	Succeeded by Lennart Finnmark
Preceded by None	Ambassador of Sweden to Bangladesh; 1972–1975	Succeeded by Lennart Finnmark
Preceded by Lennart Finnmark	Ambassador of Sweden to Yugoslavia; 1975–1978	Succeeded by Bertil Arvidson
Preceded by Lennart Finnmark	Ambassador of Sweden to Albania; 1975–1978	Succeeded by Bertil Arvidson
Preceded by Dick Hichens-Bergström	Ambassador of Sweden to Italy; 1979–1983	Succeeded by Eric Virgin
Preceded by Dick Hichens-Bergström	Ambassador of Sweden to Malta; 1979–1983	Succeeded by Eric Virgin
Preceded by Dick Hichens-Bergström	Permanent Representative of Sweden to the FAO; 1979–1983	Succeeded by Eric Virgin
Court offices
Preceded by Tore Tallroth	Grand Master of Ceremonies; 1983–1988	Succeeded by Carl Gustaf von Platen
