= Anders Ferm =

Swedish diplomat and politician (1938–2019)

- Born: Anders Jonny Ferm; 20 February 1938; Ockelbo, Sweden
- Died: 1 October 2019 (aged 81); Stockholm, Sweden
- Education: Stockholm School of Economics
- Occupations: Journalist, diplomat, politician
- Years active: 1964–2003
- Political party: Social Democratic Party
- Spouse: Birgit Wilken

Anders Jonny Ferm (20 February 1938 – 1 October 2019) was a Swedish diplomat and social democratic politician. Ferm was an important adviser to Prime Minister Olof Palme, and was Permanent Representative of Sweden to the United Nations from 1982 to 1988 and later ambassador to Denmark.

== Early life ==
Ferm was born on 20 February 1938 in Ockelbo, Sweden, the son of Rune Ferm, a sawmill worker, and his wife Daga (née Lindbäck). He earned a degree in Business Administration from Stockholm School of Economics in 1964.

== Career ==
Ferm joined the Ministry of Communications in 1964 and served as secretary to Olof Palme in 1965. He became an expert advisor at the Prime Minister's Office in 1968 and was appointed deputy director (kansliråd) there in 1969, a position he held until 1973. From 1973 to 1980, he served as head of Tidens förlag. He then became Secretary-General of the Independent Commission on Disarmament and Security Issues in Vienna from 1980 to 1982. From 1983 to 1988, he was Sweden's Permanent Representative of Sweden to the United Nations in New York City. He later assumed the role of Ambassador to Copenhagen from 1988 to 1990. Between 1990 and 1995, he was editor-in-chief of Arbetet in Malmö, and from 1995 to 2003, he serves as the Permanent Representative of Sweden to the OECD in Paris.

He was a member of the Radio Inquiry from 1974 to 1977 and held board positions at Svensk Bilprovning (Swedish Vehicle Inspection) from 1974 to 1977, Sveriges Television AB from 1978 to 1983, and PEN Sweden (Svenska PEN-klubben) from 1974 to 1980. He also served on the boards of A-Pressen from 1982 to 1983 and the Swedish Publishers' Association (Svenska bokförläggföreningen) from 1979 to 1980. Additionally, he was Vice President of the United Nations General Assembly from 1986 to 1987 and Vice Chairman of the Swedish Armed Forces' Oversight Council (Försvarsmaktens insynsråd) from 1995 onward.

== Personal life ==
Ferm was married to Birgit Wilken (born 1943).

Diplomatic posts
Preceded by Anders Thunborg	Permanent Representative of Sweden to the United Nations; 1982–1988	Succeeded by Jan Eliasson
Preceded by Carl De Geer	Ambassador of Sweden to Denmark; 1988–1990	Succeeded by Håkan Berggren
Preceded by Staffan Sohlman	Permanent Representative of Sweden to the OECD; 1995–2003	Succeeded by Gun-Britt Andersson
