= Nils-Olov Hasslev =

Swedish diplomat (1926–1990)

- Born: Nils-Olov Fredrik Hasslev; 1 November 1926; Laholm, Sweden
- Died: 5 November 1990 (aged 64); Stockholm, Sweden
- Education: Lund University; Gothenburg School of Business, Economics and Law
- Occupation: Diplomat
- Years active: 1953–1986
- Spouse: Siv Thorselius (m. 1953)
- Children: 3

Nils-Olov Fredrik Hasslev (1 November 1926 – 5 November 1990) was a Swedish diplomat.

== Early life ==
Hasslev was born on 1 November 1926 in Laholm, Sweden, the son of Filip Pålsson, an odontology doctor, and his wife Marta (née Ljungberg). He received a Candidate of Law degree from Lund University in 1949 and a degree in economics from the Gothenburg School of Business, Economics and Law in Gothenburg in 1953.

== Career ==
Hasslev conducted his clerkship at Vättle, Ale and Kullings Judicial District from 1953 to 1955 and was assistant at the Ministry of Commerce and Industry in 1955. Hasslev was first administrative officer there in 1958 and budget secretary in 1961. He was acting director in 1962 and director (byråchef) at the Ministry of Communications in 1964. Hasslev was then deputy director-general (departementsråd) from 1965 to 1966 and State Secretary there from 1969 to 1976. Hasslev was ambassador in The Hague from 1977 to 1983 and in Bangkok and Vientiane from 1983 to 1986.

Hasslev was also secretary in several government inquiries from 1955 to 1960, in the Delegation for the Atomic Energy Questions 1961-1964, served in the Committee of Supply from 1959 to 1962 and was an expert and representative of trade and custom negotiations. Hasslev was also vice chairman of the traffic policy investigation, chairman of the transport research delegation, the traffic planning investigation, the 1973 negotiating team regarding the Öresund link and the 1975 Öresund delegation. He was a member of the Nordic Road Safety Council (Nordiska trafiksäkerhetsrådet), the board of the AB Aerotransport and the Swedish Ships' Mortgage Bank (Svenska skeppshypotekskassan).

== Personal life ==
In 1953 he married Siv Thorselius (born 1928), daughter of chief surveyor Torsten Thorselius and Ingeborg (née Jungner). He was the father of Bo (born 1955), Catarina (born 1958), and Peder (born 1963).

== Awards and decorations ==
- (Sweden) Knight of the Order of the Polar Star

Diplomatic posts
| Preceded by Tord Hagen | Ambassador of Sweden to the Netherlands; 1977–1983 | Succeeded by Carl-Henric Nauckhoff |
| Preceded by Axel Edelstam | Ambassador of Sweden to Thailand; 1983–1986 | Succeeded by Olov Ternström |
| Preceded by Axel Edelstam | Ambassador of Sweden to Laos; 1983–1986 | Succeeded by ? |
