= Sven Fredrik Hedin =

Swedish diplomat (1923–2004)

- Born: 6 November 1923; Sunne, Sweden
- Died: 2 January 2004 (aged 80); Stockholm, Sweden
- Resting place: Galärvarvskyrkogården
- Education: Stockholm University College
- Occupation: Diplomat
- Years active: 1948–1998
- Spouse: Britt-Marie Huss (m. 1951)
- Children: 2

Sven Fredrik Hedin (6 November 1923 – 2 January 2004) was a Swedish diplomat. Hedin joined the Ministry of Foreign Affairs in Stockholm as an attaché in 1949 and served the following 40 years in many countries, including as ambassador in Dar es Salaam, Buenos Aires and Rome.

== Early life ==
Hedin was born on 6 November 1923 in Sunne, Sweden, the son of merchant Nathanael Hedin and Anna Palm. He was a business student in Stockholm in 1942 and served at the Swedish consulate in Prague from 1942 to 1944 and at the Swedish legation in Mexico City in 1944.

== Career ==
Hedin studied at the Stockholm University College from 1947 to 1951 and served at the Ministry for Foreign Affairs in 1948 before becoming an attaché in 1949. He served at the Swedish legations in Madrid in 1951 and in Oslo in 1953. Hedin served as temporary legation secretary in Oslo in 1954 and in Narvik the same year and at the Foreign Ministry in Stockholm from 1955 to 1958. He was secretary in Swedish delegation of the Nordic Parliamentary Committee for Freer Social Affairs (Nordiska parlamentariska kommittén för friare samfärdsel) from 1956 to 1957 and deputy secretary in the Swedish delegation of the Nordic Council from 1956 to 1958.

Hedin then served as second legation secretary in Rio de Janeiro in 1958, first legation secretary from 1959 to 1962 and first legation secretary at the Permanent Mission of Sweden to the United Nations in 1963. He was embassy counselor there from 1964 to 1965 and Deputy Director at the Foreign Ministry in Stockholm and head of its Financial Agency (Ekonomibyrå) in 1966. Hedin was then ambassador in Dar es Salaam from 1968 to 1973 and non-resident ambassador in Mogadishu from 1971 to 1973. Hedin was ambassador in Buenos Aires from 1973 to 1975 and served as Chief of Protocol at the Foreign Ministry in Stockholm from 1975 to 1979. He was then ambassador in Lisbon from 1979 to 1986 and non-resident ambassador in Bissau and Praia from 1979 to 1986. His last diplomatic post abroad was as ambassador in Rome from 1986 to 1989. Back in Sweden, Hedin served as Deputy Marshal of the Diplomatic Corps (Introduktör av främmande sändebud) from 1990 to 1993.

During his diplomatic career, Hedin was in Moscow to discuss Swedes that were supposed to have disappeared in the Soviet Union, such as the crew on the shot down DC 3 in 1952 and the boat crew of Bengt Sture in 1942. Hedin was also in West Germany among returning prisoners of war whom he interviewed to track any Swedes in Gulag. He mastered six languages in addition to his mother tongue. Hedin was chairman of the Skandia Real Estate Company in Lisbon from 1990. He was a member of the Swedish Publicists' Association and after retirement, he participated frequently in the public debate with high-profile posts. Hedin was an expert in a commission called by the Ministry for Foreign Affairs to clarify what might have happened in Sweden regarding property of Jewish origin brought here in connection with the Jewish persecution before and during World War II. On 14 December 1998, Hedin was relieved at his own request from his assignment in this commission. Together with journalist Göran Elgemyr, Hedin presented documents that highlighted the Swedish Central Bank's transactions with the so-called Nazi gold. For that work, Hedin and Elgemyr were awarded the Guldspaden for investigative journalism in 1998.

== Personal life ==
In 1951, Hedin married Britt-Marie Huss, the daughter of Professor Ragnar Huss and Dorrith Brunnel. He was the father of Jockum (born 1952) and Cecilia (born 1952).

== Death ==
Hedin died on 2 January 2004. Hedin was interred on 19 May 2004 at Galärvarvskyrkogården in Stockholm.

== Awards and decorations ==
- (Norway) Commander with Star of the Order of St. Olav (1975)
- (Norway) Knight 1st Class of the Order of St. Olav (1955)
- Knight of the Order of the Lion of Finland
- (Spain) Knight of the Order of Civil Merit
- Grand Decoration of Honour in Silver with Sash for Services to the Republic of Austria (1979)
- Grand Decoration of Honour in Gold with Star for Services to the Republic of Austria (1976)

== Bibliography ==
- Hedin, Sven Fredrik (1997). Sweden and the Shoah: the untold chapters. Policy study, 0793-260X; no. 11. Jerusalem: Institute of the World Jewish Congress. SELIBR 9823395.

Diplomatic posts
Preceded by None	Deputy Permanent Representative of Sweden to the United Nations; 1964–1965	Succeeded by Carl Johan Rappe
Preceded by Carl Gustaf Béve	Ambassador of Sweden to Tanzania; 1968–1973	Succeeded by Knut Granstedt
Preceded by Tord Hagen	Ambassador of Sweden to Somalia; 1971–1973	Succeeded by Knut Granstedt
Preceded by Östen Lundborg	Ambassador of Sweden to Argentina; 1973–1975	Succeeded by Per Bertil Kollberg
Preceded by Herman Kling	Ambassador of Sweden to Portugal; 1979–1986	Succeeded by Lennart Rydfors
Preceded by Olof Skoglund	Ambassador of Sweden to Cape Verde; 1980–1986	Succeeded by Lennart Rydfors
Preceded by Hans-Olle Olsson	Ambassador of Sweden to Guinea-Bissau; 1980–1986	Succeeded by Lennart Rydfors
Preceded by Eric Virgin	Ambassador of Sweden to Italy; 1986–1989	Succeeded by Ola Ullsten
