= List of ambassadors of Sweden to Somalia =

Ambassador of Sweden to Somalia
- Lesser coat of arms of the Kingdom of Sweden
- Incumbent; Hans Henric Lundqvist since 2025
- Ministry for Foreign Affairs; Swedish Embassy, Nairobi
- Style: His or Her Excellency (formal); Mr. or Madam Ambassador (informal)
- Reports to: Minister for Foreign Affairs
- Seat: Nairobi, Kenya (Note: The ambassador is based at the Somalia Section at the Swedish Embassy in Nairobi, Kenya.)
- Appointer: Government of Sweden
- Term length: No fixed term
- Inaugural holder: Åke Sjölin
- Formation: July 1961

The Ambassador of Sweden to Somalia (known formally as the Ambassador of the Kingdom of Sweden to the Federal Republic of Somalia) is the official representative of the government of Sweden to the president of Somalia and Federal Government of Somalia. The ambassador is based at the Somalia Section at the Swedish Embassy in Nairobi, Kenya.

== History ==
On the occasion of Somalia’s declaration of independence on 1 July 1960, Acting Foreign Minister Herman Kling sent a congratulatory telegram to Somalia’s head of government, Abdullahi Issa, in which he stated that the Swedish government recognized the Somali Republic as a sovereign and independent state. The telegram also expressed hopes for friendly and cordial relations between the two countries. Sweden was represented at the celebrations in Mogadishu by its envoy in Addis Ababa, Åke Sjölin, who had been instructed to convey the King’s congratulations.

In July 1961, Ambassador Sjölin, based in Addis Ababa, was appointed as Sweden’s first envoy to Somalia when he was also accredited to Mogadishu. On 6 December 1961, Sjölin presented his credentials to President Cheab in Mogadishu.

Sweden has never had a resident Swedish ambassador in Mogadishu. Instead, the Swedish ambassadors based in the capitals of nearby countries—Addis Ababa (1961–1964), Cairo (1964–1970, 1980–1981), and Dar es Salaam (1971–1979)—were accredited to Mogadishu from 1961. From 1980 onward, the ambassador was based in Stockholm.

In 1991, the collapse of the Somali Democratic Republic amid the outbreak of the Somali Civil War left the country without a central government. Krister Göranson was Sweden’s ambassador to Somalia during 1992. In early 1993, it was reported that there was no formal government or president in Somalia who could accredit Swedish diplomats. As a result, the ambassadorial post remained vacant from 1992 onward.

In April 2013, a new Swedish ambassador to Somalia was appointed after the post had been vacant since 1992. That same year, the ambassador was based at the Somalia Section of the Swedish Embassy in Nairobi, Kenya. The ambassador, who heads the section, travels regularly to Somalia.

== List of representatives ==
Name	Period	Title	Notes	Ref
Somali Republic (1960–1969)
Åke Sjölin	1961–1964	Ambassador	Resident in Addis Ababa.	
Adolf Croneborg	1964–1966	Ambassador	Resident in Cairo.	
Tord Hagen	1967–1969	Ambassador	Resident in Cairo.	
Somali Democratic Republic (1969–1991)
Tord Hagen	1969–1970	Ambassador	Resident in Cairo.	
Sven Fredrik Hedin	1971–1973	Ambassador	Resident in Dar es Salaam	
Knut Granstedt	1973–1977	Ambassador	Resident in Dar es Salaam	
Lennart Eckerberg	1977–1979	Ambassador	Resident in Dar es Salaam	
Axel Edelstam	1980–1981	Ambassador	Resident in Cairo.	
Arne Fältheim	1981–1983	Ambassador	Resident in Stockholm.	
Finn Bergstrand	1983–1986	Ambassador	Resident in Stockholm.	
Lars Arnö	1986–1988	Ambassador	Resident in Stockholm.	
Lars Schönander	1988–1992	Ambassador	Resident in Stockholm.	
Krister Göranson	1992–1992	Ambassador	Resident in Stockholm.	(Note: From 1992 the position was vacant.)
No Swedish ambassador was accredited to Somalia between 1992 and 2013.
Mikael Lindvall	April 2013 – July 2017	Ambassador	Resident in Nairobi.	
Andreas von Uexküll	1 September 2017 – 2019	Ambassador	Resident in Nairobi.	
Staffan Tillander	1 September 2019 – 2021	Ambassador	Resident in Nairobi.	
Per Lindgärde	2021–2023	Ambassador	Resident in Nairobi.	
Joachim Waern	August 2023 – 2025	Ambassador	Resident in Nairobi.	
Hans Henric Lundqvist	2025 – present	Ambassador	Resident in Nairobi.	
