= Kaj Sundberg =

Swedish diplomat (1924–1993)

- Born: Kaj Ingemar Sundberg; 1 April 1924; Färila, Sweden
- Died: 7 November 1993 (aged 69)
- Education: Lundsbergs boarding school
- Alma mater: Uppsala University
- Occupation: Diplomat
- Years active: 1948–1990
- Spouse: Ardra Hall Johnston (m. 1966)
- Children: 2

Kaj Ingemar Sundberg (1 April 1924 – 7 November 1993) was a Swedish diplomat.

== Early life ==
Sundberg was born on 1 April 1924 in Färila, Gävleborg County, Sweden, the son of Karl-Filip Sundberg (1893–1955), a physician, and his wife Bertha Ebba Charlotta Ratsman (1896–1952). He had one brother, Bo Lennart (born 1929). He passed studentexamen at Lundsbergs boarding school in 1942 and received a Candidate of Law degree from Uppsala University in 1948.

== Career ==
Following his studies, Sundberg was employed as an attaché at the Ministry for Foreign Affairs in Stockholm in 1948. From 1949 to 1952 he served in Helsinki and from 1952 to 1954 he served in Bombay. He returned to the Ministry for Foreign Affairs in 1954 and became second Secretary and then the first secretary in 1961. Sundberg was appointed first secretary in Washington, D.C. in 1962 and then commercial counsellor there in 1963. Sundberg was deputy director and head of the UN Office at the Foreign Ministry in 1965, counsellor with the position as minister in the Swedish UN delegation in New York City in 1970, with the position of ambassador in 1974. Sundberg was ambassador to Teheran and Kabul from 1978 to 1980, in Helsinki from 1980 to 1984, and in Brussels from 1984 to 1989. He then served at the UN delegation in New York City from 1989 to 1990.

== Personal life ==
In 1966, Sundberg married Ardra Hall Johnston (born 12 August 1941 in Oil City, Pennsylvania, USA), the daughter of Drew Johnston and Nancy (née Spear). They had two sons, PhD Kaj Christian Filip Sundberg (born 11 October 1966 in Stockholm, Sweden), a physician and Drew Johnston Sundberg (born 9 August 1971 in New York City, New York, USA), a lawyer.

== Death ==
Sundberg died on 7 November 1993. On 1 December 1993, he was interred at Uppsala Old Cemetery.

== Awards ==
- Commander of the Order of the White Rose of Finland
- (Netherlands) Knight of the Order of Orange-Nassau

Diplomatic posts
Preceded by Börje Billner	Deputy Permanent Representative of Sweden to the United Nations; 1970–1978	Succeeded by Olov Ternström
Preceded by Bengt Odhner	Ambassador of Sweden to Iran; 1978–1980	Succeeded by Göran Bundy
Preceded by Bengt Odhner	Ambassador of Sweden to Afghanistan; 1978–1979	Succeeded by None until 2002
Preceded by Sten Sundfeldt	Ambassador of Sweden to Finland; 1980–1984	Succeeded by Knut Thyberg
Preceded by Jean-Jacques von Dardel	Ambassador of Sweden to Belgium; 1984–1989	Succeeded by Henrik Liljegren
Preceded by Jean-Jacques von Dardel	Ambassador of Sweden to Luxembourg; 1984–1989	Succeeded by Henrik Liljegren
