= Carl Johan Rappe =

Swedish diplomat (1918–2010)

Baron Carl Johan Rappe
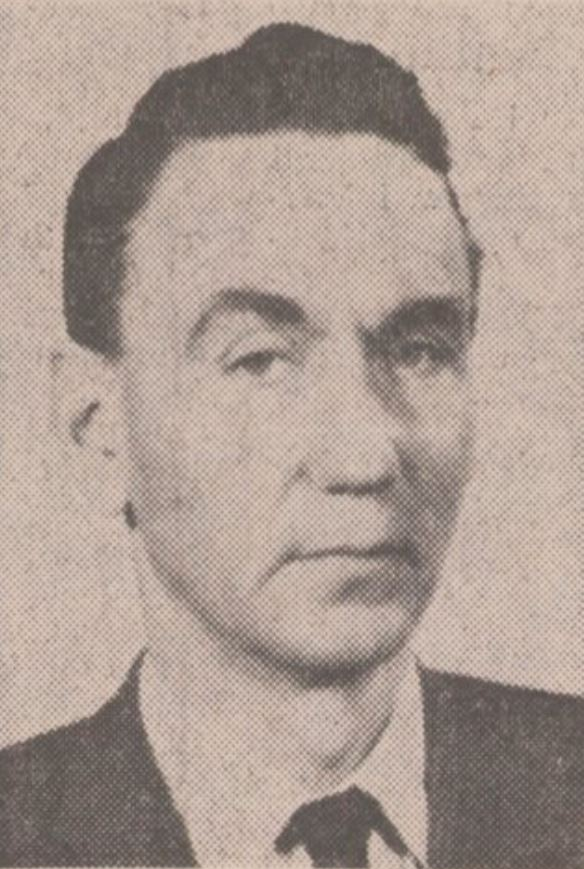
- Born: Carl Johan Melcher Rappe; 18 January 1918; Ryssby, Sweden
- Died: 7 January 2010 (aged 91); Skanör, Sweden
- Education: Sigtunaskolan
- Alma mater: Uppsala University
- Occupation: Diplomat
- Years active: 1943–1981
- Spouse: Marianne Fredelius (m. 1940; div. 1958)
- Children: 2

Baron Carl Johan Melcher Rappe (18 January 1918 – 7 January 2010) was a Swedish diplomat who served in the Ministry for Foreign Affairs for several decades. After earning a law degree from Uppsala University in 1943, he joined the diplomatic service in 1945.

During his career he held postings in Warsaw, Helsinki, Pretoria, Tehran, Baghdad, and London, and served as Sweden's Deputy Permanent Representative to the United Nations in New York City (1965–1967). He later served as ambassador in Bucharest, East Berlin, and Warsaw, and as envoy to Pretoria with accreditation to several southern African capitals. Toward the end of his career he represented Sweden at the Conference on Security and Co-operation in Europe (CSCE) in Madrid from 1980 to 1981.

== Early life ==
Carl Johan was born into the noble Rappe family at Ryssbylund Manor in Ryssby, Kalmar County, Sweden, on 18 January 1918. His father, Baron Carl Adolf Rappe (1875–1933), was an agronomist and owner of several estates, including Ryssbylund, Mossberga, Söregärde, and Stora Vångerslätt, all located in Ryssby Parish. His paternal grandfather was the Member of Parliament Baron Christopher Rappe (1843–1930).

His mother was Ingegerd Maria Ekströmer (1884–1972), from the noble Ekströmer family. His maternal grandfather was the railway builder, ironworks owner, and Member of Parliament Melcher Ekströmer (1835–1923), and his maternal great-grandfather was the physician and Member of Parliament Carl Johan Ekströmer (1793–1860).

Rappe had an older sister and an older brother. A younger brother died in infancy. He passed his upper secondary school graduation at Sigtunaskolan in Sigtuna on 19 May 1937 and received Candidate of Law degree from Uppsala University in 1943.

== Career ==
Rappe served at the Stockholm City Court from 1943 to 1945. In 1945 he joined the Ministry for Foreign Affairs as an attaché and was posted to Warsaw from 1945 to 1947 and to Helsinki from 1947 to 1949. He then served at the Ministry for Foreign Affairs in Stockholm from 1949 to 1953. He was appointed legation secretary in Pretoria from 1953 to 1958, first embassy secretary in Tehran from 1958 to 1961, and served as chargé d'affaires ad interim in Baghdad from 1961 to 1962. From 1962 to 1965 he was embassy counsellor in London.

Between 1965 and 1967 he served as minister and Deputy Permanent Representative of Sweden to the United Nations in New York City. He was then amabssador in Bucharest from 1967 to 1970, and envoy to Pretoria with concurrent accreditation to Gaborone, Maseru, and Mbabane from 1970 to 1973. Rappe later served as ambassador in East Berlin from 1973 to 1976 and in Warsaw from 1976 to 1979. After returning to the Ministry for Foreign Affairs in Stockholm from 1979 to 1981, he was appointed Sweden's Permanent Representative of Sweden at the Conference on Security and Co-operation in Europe (CSCE) in Madrid from 1980 to 1981.

== Personal life ==
Rappe was married from 1940 to 1958 to Märta Marianne Fredelius (1916–1989), the daughter of the lawyer Bertil Fredelius and his wife, née Sjöman, from Gothenburg. They had two daughters: Ewa (1940–2004) and Anna (born 1948).

After his retirement, he lived in Grasse, France, until the mid-1990s, after which he moved to Beaulieu-sur-Mer, France, and later finally settled in Skanör, Sweden.

== Death ==
Rappe died on 7 January 2010 in Skanör, Sweden.

== Awards and decorations ==
- (Sweden) Commander of the Order of the Polar Star (1 December 1973)
- (Sweden) Knight of the Order of the Polar Star (1967)
- (Iran) Commander of the Order of Homayoun
- Knight of the Order of the White Rose of Finland

Diplomatic posts
Preceded by Sven Fredrik Hedin	Deputy Permanent Representative of Sweden to the United Nations; 1965–1967	Succeeded by Börje Billner
Preceded by Olof Bjurström	Ambassador of Sweden to Romania; 1967–1970	Succeeded by Nils-Eric Ekblad
Preceded by Eric Virgin	Envoy of Sweden to South Africa; 1970–1973	Succeeded by Lennart Westerberg
Preceded by Eric Virgin	Ambassador of Sweden to Lesotho; 1970–1973	Succeeded by Lennart Westerberg
Preceded by Eric Virgin	Ambassador of Sweden to Botswana; 1970–1973	Succeeded by Iwo Dölling
Preceded by None	Ambassador of Sweden to Swaziland; 1970–1973	Succeeded by Lennart Westerberg
Preceded by None	Ambassador of Sweden to East Germany; 1973–1976	Succeeded by Eric Virgin
Preceded by Claës Ivar Wollin	Ambassador of Sweden to Poland; 1976–1979	Succeeded by Knut Thyberg
Preceded by None	Permanent Representative of Sweden to the CSCE; 1980–1981	Succeeded by Björn Skala
