= Eric Virgin (diplomat) =

Swedish diplomat (1920–2004)

- Born: Eric Otto Gunnarsson Virgin; 31 March 1920; Stockholm, Sweden
- Died: 9 September 2004 (aged 84); Stockholm, Sweden
- Resting place: Norra begravningsplatsen
- Occupation: Diplomat
- Years active: 1942–1986
- Spouse: Gitt Cassel (m. 1951)
- Children: 2

Eric Otto Gunnarsson Virgin (31 March 1920 – 9 September 2004) was a Swedish diplomat.

== Early life ==
Virgin was born on 31 March 1920 in Svea Artillery Regiment Parish in Stockholm, Sweden, the son of Colonel Gunnar Virgin and Elsie, née Ramel (aunt to Povel Ramel). His grandfather was Major General Otto Virgin who served as minister of war from 1903 to 1905.

Virgin passed his reserve officer exam in 1941 and received a Candidate of Law degree in 1942.

== Career ==
Virgin became an attaché the same year at the Ministry for Foreign Affairs in 1942. He served in New York City in 1943, Washington, D.C. in 1945 and at the Ministry of Finance from 1947 to 1949. Early in his career he was associate of Dag Hammarskjöld in cases involving international financial issues.

He became first administrative officer in 1949, first secretary at the Foreign Ministry in 1950 and was director there in 1955. Virgin was embassy counselor in Rome from 1957 to 1962 and was Permanent Representative of Sweden to the United Nations in New York City from 1962 to 1963. He was head of the Foreign Ministry's Report Secretariat from 1963 to 1965 and was director-general of the Foreign Ministry's negotiating team in Stockholm from 1965 to 1966. Virgin was then envoy in Pretoria from 1966 to 1970, with concurrent accreditation in Gaborone (from 1969) and Maseru (from 1968), Bangkok, Kuala Lumpur, Singapore, Rangoon, and Vientiane from 1970 to 1976 and in East Berlin from 1976 to 1982. He was fiscal policy negotiator at the Foreign Ministry from 1982 to 1983 and ambassador in Rome and Valletta from 1983 to 1986.

Virgin participated in various negotiations, including in the Organisation for Economic Co-operation and Development between 1947 and 1957. He was a consultant for FFV International in 1986, chairman of the Association of Friends of Swedish Museums (Svenska museivänföreningen), Association of Friends of the Museum of Far Eastern Antiquities (Föreningen Östasiatiska Museets Vänner) and the Swedish Committee Pro Venezia (Svenska kommittén Pro Venezia).

== Personal life ==
Virgin married on 19 May 1951 with Margareta Elisabet ("Gitt") Cassel (1927–2017), daughter of works manager Fredrik Cassel and Margareta (née Lindforss). He was the father of Louise (born 1953) and Caroline (born 1954).

== Deaths ==
Virgin died on 9 September 2004 in Stockholm, Sweden. He was interred on 14 September 2005 at Norra begravningsplatsen in Solna.

== Awards ==
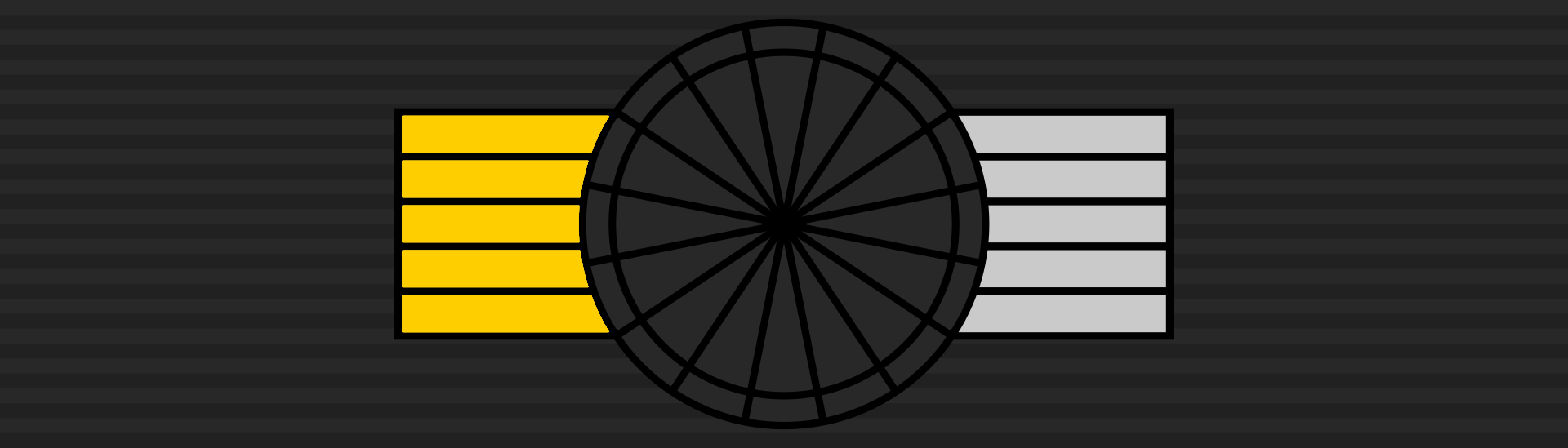
- (Sweden) Commanders 1st Class of the Order of the Polar Star (1 December 1973)
- (Sweden) Knight of the Order of the Polar Star (1960)
- (West Germany) Commander of the Order of Merit of the Federal Republic of Germany
- (Norway) Knight 1st Class of the Order of St. Olav
- (Norway) King Haakon VII Freedom Cross

Diplomatic posts
Preceded by Hugo Tamm	Envoy of Sweden to South Africa; 1966–1970	Succeeded by Carl Johan Rappe
Preceded by None	Envoy of Sweden to Botswana; 1969–1970	Succeeded by Carl Johan Rappe
Preceded by None	Envoy of Sweden to Lesotho; 1968–1970	Succeeded by Carl Johan Rappe
Preceded by Axel Lewenhaupt	Ambassador of Sweden to Thailand; 1970–1976	Succeeded by Jean-Christophe Öberg
Preceded by Axel Lewenhaupt	Ambassador of Sweden to Singapore; 1970–1976	Succeeded by Jean-Christophe Öberg
Preceded by Axel Lewenhaupt	Ambassador of Sweden to Burma; 1970–1976	Succeeded by Arne Fältheim
Preceded by Axel Lewenhaupt	Ambassador of Sweden to Malaysia; 1970–1976	Succeeded by Arne Fältheim
Preceded by Axel Lewenhaupt	Ambassador of Sweden to Laos; 1970–1976	Succeeded by Jean-Christophe Öberg
Preceded by Carl Johan Rappe	Ambassador of Sweden to East Germany; 1976–1982	Succeeded by Rune Nyström
Preceded by Axel Lewenhaupt	Ambassador of Sweden to Italy; 1983–1986	Succeeded by Sven Fredrik Hedin
Preceded by Axel Lewenhaupt	Ambassador of Sweden to Malta; 1983–1986	Succeeded by Bengt Friedman
Preceded by Axel Lewenhaupt	Permanent Representative of Sweden to the FAO; 1983–1984	Succeeded by Gösta Ericsson
