= Lars von Celsing =

Swedish diplomat (1916–2009)

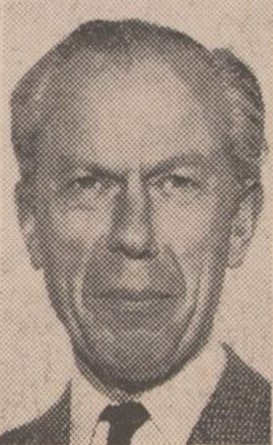
- von Celsing c. 1960s
- Born: Lars Petrus Folke von Celsing; 1 April 1916; Stockholm, Sweden
- Died: 17 August 2009 (aged 93); Lovön, Sweden
- Education: Stockholm University College
- Occupation: Diplomat
- Years active: 1942–1979
- Spouse(s): Silvia Elena Maria (Sylvita) Miguens (m. 1942–1950) Ulla Zetterberg (m. 1955)
- Children: 2
- Relatives: Peter Celsing (brother)

Lars Petrus Folke von Celsing (1 April 1916 – 17 August 2009) was a Swedish diplomat. He joined the Ministry for Foreign Affairs in 1942 and served in Bern, New York City at the United Nations Security Council, London, Lisbon, Tehran, Baghdad, and Helsinki. At the Foreign Ministry, he became Director of the Political Department (1963) and deputy director (1965).

From 1967 to 1972 he was ambassador to Morocco, Senegal, The Gambia, and Mauritania, notably witnessing the failed coup against King Hassan II in 1971. He later served as ambassador to Egypt and Sudan (1972–1976) and concluded his career in Brussels and Luxembourg (1976–1979).

== Early life ==
von Celsing was born on 1 April 1916, in Stockholm, Sweden, the son of Folke von Celsing, a bank executive, and his wife Margareta (née Norström). He grew up in a distinguished family, alongside his brothers Peter, who would later become a noted architect, and Fredrik, who pursued a career in medicine.

The von Celsings belonged to an old noble family with deep historical roots. Their lineage traced back to Andreas Petri Normolander, a parish priest in Östergötland. Among their ancestors was Gustaf Celsing (1679–1743), who accompanied King Charles XII during the Skirmish at Bender in 1713. Two of Gustaf's sons, Gustaf Celsing (1723–1789) and Ulric Celsing (1731–1805), went on to serve successively as Swedish envoys in Constantinople—establishing a long tradition of diplomacy in the family.

After completing his studentexamen on 8 May 1934, von Celsing studied law at Stockholm University College, where he earned his Candidate of Law degree in 1942. His education also took him abroad, with further studies in Paris and Berlin, experiences that broadened his outlook just as Europe was being reshaped by war. That same year, he entered the Ministry for Foreign Affairs as an attaché, beginning what would become a long diplomatic career.

== Career ==
von Celsing began his diplomatic career in Bern in 1943, returning there a few years later as second legation secretary in 1947. That same year, he joined Sweden's delegation to the United Nations, marking the start of a career deeply tied to international affairs. In 1948, he moved to New York City to serve at the United Nations Security Council.

By 1950, he was appointed first legation secretary in London, and two years later took up the post of first secretary at the Swedish Ministry for Foreign Affairs. His assignments soon carried him further afield: he was chargé d’affaires ad interim in Lisbon from 1953 to 1954, and in 1955 became first embassy secretary with responsibilities in both Tehran and Baghdad. From 1958 to 1962, he served as embassy counsellor in Helsinki, before returning to Stockholm as Director of the Political Department in 1963 and then deputy director in 1965.

In 1967, von Celsing was appointed Ambassador to Morocco, a role that soon expanded to include Senegal, The Gambia (from 1968), and Mauritania (from 1970). His time in Rabat placed him at the center of one of Morocco's most dramatic moments: the failed coup attempt during King Hassan II's birthday celebration on 10 July 1971. Standing just beside the Belgian ambassador, Marcel Dupret, von Celsing witnessed the chaos firsthand. Dupret was struck by eighteen bullets and died in the arms of the French ambassador.

After leaving Morocco in 1972, von Celsing was posted to Cairo and Khartoum, serving as Sweden's ambassador to Egypt and Sudan until 1976. He later concluded his diplomatic career in Brussels and Luxembourg City, where he served as ambassador from 1976 to 1979.

== Personal life ==
On 4 July 1942, von Celsing married Silvia Elena Maria ("Sylvita") Miguens (born 1919) in Stockholm. She was the daughter of the Argentinian ambassador Carlos Miguens and Silvia de Cásares. The couple had two daughters, Christina (born 1944) and Helena (born 1947), before divorcing in 1950.

In 1955, von Celsing married again, this time to the actress Ulla Zetterberg (1923–2011), daughter of merchant Erik Börjesson and Ida (née Clauss).

After his retirement, von Celsing and Ulla settled in France, where they lived for many years—first in Loches and later in Villeneuve-Loubet on the Mediterranean coast. Only a few years before his death did they return to Sweden, making their home in Adolfsberg, Drottningholm, Stockholm.

== Death ==
von Celsing died on 17 August 2009. He was interred on 15 June 2010 at Lovö Cemetery in Lovön in Ekerö Municipality, Sweden.

== Awards and decorations ==
- (Sweden) Commander of the Order of the Polar Star (1 December 1973)
- (Sweden) Knight of the Order of the Polar Star (1967)
- (Iran) Commander of the Order of Homayoun
- (Norway) Knight 1st Class of the Order of St. Olav (1953)

== Bibliography ==
- Celsing, Lars von (1986). Familjekrönika [Family history book] (in Swedish). [Stockholm]: [L. von Celsing]. ISBN 91-7328-558-7. SELIBR 7635172.
- Celsing, Lars von (1986). Carl Edvard Norström: den glömde järnvägsbyggaren [Carl Edvard Norström: the forgotten railway builder] (in Swedish). Stockholm: [L. von Celsing]. ISBN 91-7328-583-8. SELIBR 7635192.

Diplomatic posts
Preceded by Bo Siegbahn	Ambassador of Sweden to Morocco; 1967–1972	Succeeded by Åke Sjölin
Preceded by Bo Siegbahn	Ambassador of Sweden to Senegal; 1967–1972	Succeeded by Åke Sjölin
Preceded by None	Ambassador of Sweden to the Gambia; 1967–1972	Succeeded by Åke Sjölin
Preceded by None	Ambassador of Sweden to Mauritania; 1970–1972	Succeeded by Åke Sjölin
Preceded by Tord Hagen	Ambassador of Sweden to Egypt; 1972–1976	Succeeded by Axel Edelstam
Preceded by Tord Hagen	Ambassador of Sweden to Sudan; 1972–1976	Succeeded by Axel Edelstam
Preceded by Tord Göransson	Ambassador of Sweden to Belgium; 1976–1979	Succeeded by Jean-Jacques von Dardel
Preceded by Tord Göransson	Ambassador of Sweden to Luxembourg; 1976–1979	Succeeded by Jean-Jacques von Dardel
