= Olov Ternström =

Swedish diplomat (1927–2001)

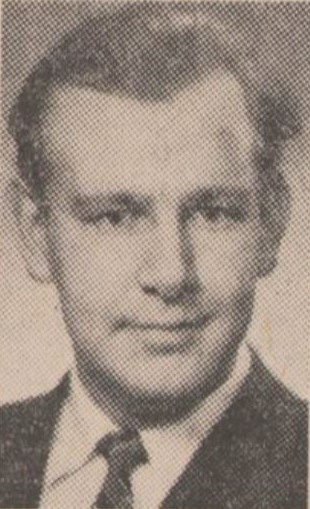
- Ternström c. 1960s
- Born: Olov Arthur Ternström; 1 February 1927; Lund, Sweden
- Died: 14 July 2001 (aged 74); Cheltenham, England
- Education: Stockholm School of Economics
- Occupation: Diplomat
- Years active: 1948–1992
- Spouse(s): Margareta Röningberg (m. 1955) Myrtle Langham (m. 1983)
- Children: 2

Olov Arthur Ternström (1 February 1927 – 14 July 2001) was a Swedish diplomat.

== Early life ==
Ternström was born on 1 February 1927 in Lund, Sweden, the son of Arthur Ternström, an accountant, and Astrid (née Andersson). He gained a degree in economics at the Stockholm School of Economics in 1949 and received the title of civilekonom.

== Career ==
Ternström worked in the Swedish General Export Association (Sveriges allmänna exportförening) from 1948 to 1957 before becoming an attaché at the Ministry for Foreign Affairs in 1957. Ternström served in Washington, D.C. in 1958, was the secretary at the Foreign Ministry in 1961 and director at the Council for Swedish Information Abroad (Upplysningsberedningen) in 1961 which was a coordinating committee for overseas information. He was then consul in Hong Kong in 1964, press counsellor in London in 1967 and trade counsellor there in 1971. Ternström was deputy head of the Administration Department at the Foreign Ministry in 1973. He was ambassador in Tunis in 1976 and served in the Swedish United Nations delegation in New York City in 1978. Ternström was ambassador in Cairo and in Khartoum from 1981 to 1986. In 1981, while Ternström was ambassador in Egypt, he escaped unhurt after the Egyptian President Anwar Sadat was assassinated. He ended his diplomatic career by being ambassador in Bangkok from 1986 to 1992. During this time, he held dual accreditations to Rangoon and Vientiane.

Ternström worked as a special adviser to Oxfam from 1993 to 1994 and correspondent for Svenska Dagbladet from 1994.

== Personal life ==
Ternström was married twice. In 1955 he married Margareta Röningberg, the daughter of school teacher Erik Röningberg and sculptor Ingrid (née Geijer). In 1983, Ternström married Myrtle Langham. Towards the end of his life Ternström was a resident of Cheltenham, England.

== Death ==
Ternström died on 14 July 2001 in Cheltenham, England. On 28 March 2002, he was interred in Bromma Cemetery in Stockholm.

Diplomatic posts
Preceded by Torsten Björck	Consul of Sweden to Hong Kong; 1964–1967	Succeeded by Carl Kjellberg
Preceded by Marc Giron	Ambassador of Sweden to Tunisia; 1976–1978	Succeeded by Carl-Henric Nauckhoff
Preceded by Kaj Sundberg	Deputy Permanent Representative of Sweden to the United Nations; 1978–1981	Succeeded by Jan Lundvik
Preceded by Axel Edelstam	Ambassador of Sweden to Egypt; 1981–1986	Succeeded by Lars-Olof Brilioth
Preceded by Axel Edelstam	Ambassador of Sweden to Sudan; 1981–1986	Succeeded by Lars-Olof Brilioth
Preceded by Nils-Olov Hasslev	Ambassador of Sweden to Thailand; 1986–1992	Succeeded by Eva Heckscher
Preceded by Nils-Olov Hasslev	Ambassador of Sweden to Laos; 1986–1992	Succeeded by Eva Heckscher
