= List of ambassadors of Sweden to Thailand =

Ambassador of Sweden to Thailand
- Lesser coat of arms of the Kingdom of Sweden
- Incumbent; Anna Hammargren since August 2023
- Ministry for Foreign Affairs; Swedish Embassy, Bangkok
- Style: His or Her Excellency (formal); Mr. or Madam Ambassador (informal)
- Reports to: Minister for Foreign Affairs
- Residence: Baan Suan Mark, 2-3 soi Patanasin, Nanglinchee Road, Thung Maha Mek, Sathon district
- Seat: Bangkok, Thailand
- Appointer: Government of Sweden
- Term length: No fixed term
- Inaugural holder: Johan Hultman
- Formation: 1931
- Website: Swedish Embassy, Bangkok

The Ambassador of Sweden to Thailand (known formally as the Ambassador of the Kingdom of Sweden to the Kingdom of Thailand) is the official representative of the government of Sweden to the monarch of Thailand and government of Thailand.

== History ==
Diplomatic relations between Sweden and Thailand were established in 1868. Between 1931 and 1959, Sweden had a non-resident envoy accredited to Thailand from Japan and China. In July 1959, an agreement was reached between the Swedish and Thai governments on the mutual elevation of the respective countries' legations to embassies. The diplomatic rank was thereafter changed to ambassador instead of envoy extraordinary and minister plenipotentiary. In connection with this, Tord Hagen was appointed Sweden's first resident ambassador in Bangkok.

== List of representatives ==
Name	Period	Title	Notes	Presented credentials	Ref
Siam (–1939)
Johan Hultman	1931–1936	Envoy	Resident in Tokyo.		
Widar Bagge	1937–1939	Envoy	Resident in Tokyo.		
Thailand (1939–present)
Widar Bagge	1939–1945	Envoy	Resident in Tokyo.		
Torsten Hammarström	1948–1951	Envoy	Resident in Beijing		
–	1952–1952	–	Vacant		
Hugo Wistrand	1953–1956	Envoy	Resident in Beijing		
Klas Böök	1956–1959	Envoy	Resident in Beijing		
Tord Hagen	1959–1964	Ambassador	Also accredited to Phnom Penh (from 1961), Rangoon, and Saigon (from 1960)		
Åke Sjölin	1964–1967	Ambassador	Also accredited to Kuala Lumpur, Rangoon, Saigon, Singapore (from 1966), and Vientiane (from 1965)		
Axel Lewenhaupt	1967–1970	Ambassador	Also accredited to Kuala Lumpur, Rangoon, Singapore, and Vientiane (from 1968)		
Eric Virgin	1971–1976	Ambassador	Also accredited to Kuala Lumpur, Rangoon, Singapore, and Vientiane		
Jean-Christophe Öberg	1976–1981	Ambassador	Also accredited to Singapore and Vientiane		
Axel Edelstam	1981–1982	Ambassador	Also accredited to Singapore and Vientiane		
Nils-Olov Hasslev	1983–1986	Ambassador	Also accredited to Rangoon and Vientiane		
Olov Ternström	1986–1992	Ambassador	Also accredited to Vientiane and Yangon/Rangoon		
Eva Heckscher	1992–1997	Ambassador	Also accredited to Phnom Penh (1993–96), Vientiane (1993–96), and Yangon (1992–96)		
Inga Eriksson Fogh	1997–1998	Ambassador	Also accredited to Phnom Penh, Vientiane, and Yangon		
Jan Axel Nordlander	1999–2004	Ambassador	Also accredited to Phnom Penh, Vientiane (from 2000), and Yangon (from 2000)		
Jonas Hafström	2004–2007	Ambassador	Also accredited to Phnom Penh, Vientiane, and Yangon		
Lennart Linnér	2007–2011	Ambassador	Also accredited to Manila (from 2008), Phnom Penh, Vientiane, and Yangon		
Klas Molin	2011–2015	Ambassador	Also accredited to Manila, Naypyidaw, and Vientiane		
Staffan Herrström	2015–2020	Ambassador	Also accredited to Manila (until 2016), Naypyidaw, and Vientiane (Note: The Swedish embassy in Manila opened in 2016 and a resident ambassador was then stationed there.)		
Jon Åström Gröndahl	1 September 2020 – 31 July 2023	Ambassador	Also accredited to Naypyidaw, Phnom Penh (from 2021), and Vientiane	19 April 2021	
Anna Hammargren	August 2023 – present	Ambassador	Also accredited to and Phnom Penh and Vientiane		

== See also ==
- Embassy of Sweden, Bangkok
