= Permanent Representative of Sweden to the United Nations =

- Lesser coat of arms of the Kingdom of Sweden
- Incumbent; Nicola Clase since 2024
- Ministry for Foreign Affairs; Permanent Mission of Sweden to the United Nations
- Style: His or Her Excellency (formal); Mr. or Madam Ambassador (informal)
- Reports to: Minister for Foreign Affairs
- Seat: United Nations Headquarters; New York City, New York, USA
- Appointer: Government of Sweden
- Term length: No fixed term
- Formation: 1947
- First holder: Herman Eriksson
- Deputy: Deputy Permanent Representative
- Website: www.swedenabroad.se/en/embassies/un-new-york/

The Permanent Representative of Sweden to the United Nations is head of the Permanent Mission of Sweden to the United Nations in New York City, United States.

== History ==
In 1947, Sweden appointed its first permanent representative to the United Nations, Herman Eriksson, who had been the Swedish minister in Washington, D.C. for the previous two years. For long periods, Eriksson served as the sole Swedish delegate during the negotiations. When he later fell ill and required a lengthy period of convalescence, the Swedish government appointed him to the less demanding post of Swedish ambassador in Copenhagen. The UN position was then taken over by Ambassador Gunnar Hägglöf, who was appointed in August 1947.

Olof Rydbeck was appointed permanent representative in 1972. His first major task as UN ambassador was to help complete the preparations for the first United Nations Conference on the Human Environment, held in Stockholm in 1972. He strongly advocated for China's participation, a goal that was successfully realized when China was admitted to the UN around the same time. Rydbeck actively supported Sweden's positive stance on this sensitive issue. Another major and controversial topic during his tenure was South Africa's apartheid policy, where his views were met with respect. His talent for achieving compromise proved valuable when, in 1976, he became chairman of the Second Committee (Economic and Financial) of General Assembly, which was marked by sharp divisions between industrialized and developing countries. The highlight of Rydbeck's time as head of the Swedish UN delegation came when Sweden gained a seat on the Security Council in 1975–76. He contributed to reforms in the council's working procedures, and Sweden's decisive "yes" vote on the question of granting the PLO the right to speak before the council had significant political impact.

== List of permanent representatives ==
No.	Portrait	Ambassador	Took office	Left office	Time in office	Prime Minister	Ref.
1	Herman Eriksson [sv]	Herman Eriksson (1892–1949)	17 January 1947	25 August 1947	220 days	Tage Erlander	
2	Gunnar Hägglöf	Gunnar Hägglöf (1904–1994)	1947	1948	0–1 years	Tage Erlander	
3	Sven Grafström	Sven Grafström (1902–1955)	26 August 1948	1952	3–4 years	Tage Erlander	
4	Oscar Thorsing [sv]	Oscar Thorsing (1896–1967)	1952	1956	3–4 years	Tage Erlander	
5	Gunnar Jarring	Gunnar Jarring (1907–2002)	1956	1958	1–2 years	Tage Erlander	
6	Agda Rössel	Agda Rössel (1910–2001)	1958	1964	5–6 years	Tage Erlander	
7	Sverker Åström	Sverker Åström (1915–2012)	1964	1970	5–6 years	Tage Erlander; Olof Palme	
-	Olof Rydbeck	Olof Rydbeck (1913–1995); Acting	10 September 1970	30 September 1972	2 years, 20 days	Olof Palme	
8	Olof Rydbeck	Olof Rydbeck (1913–1995)	1 October 1972	1976	3–4 years	Olof Palme	
9	Anders Thunborg	Anders Thunborg (1934–2004)	1977	1983	5–6 years	Thorbjörn Fälldin; Ola Ullsten; Thorbjörn Fälldin; Olof Palme	
10	Anders Ferm	Anders Ferm (1938–2019)	1983	1988	4–5 years	Olof Palme; Ingvar Carlsson	
11	Jan Eliasson	Jan Eliasson (born 1940)	1988	1992	3–4 years	Ingvar Carlsson; Carl Bildt	
12	Peter Osvald [sv]	Peter Osvald (born 1939)	1992	1997	4–5 years	Carl Bildt; Ingvar Carlsson; Göran Persson	
13	Hans Dahlgren	Hans Dahlgren (born 1948)	1997	2000	2–3 years	Göran Persson	
14	Pierre Schori	Pierre Schori (born 1938)	2000	2004	3–4 years	Göran Persson	-
15	Anders Lidén	Anders Lidén (born 1949)	2004	2010	5–6 years	Göran Persson; Fredrik Reinfeldt	
16	Mårten Grunditz [sv]	Mårten Grunditz (1949–2015)	2010	2015	4–5 years	Fredrik Reinfeldt; Stefan Löfven	-
17	Olof Skoog	Olof Skoog (born 1962)	2015	2019	3–4 years	Stefan Löfven	
18	Anna Karin Eneström	Anna Karin Eneström (born 1961)	December 2019	30 September 2024	4–5 years	Stefan Löfven; Magdalena Andersson; Ulf Kristersson	
19	Nicola Clase [sv; no]	Nicola Clase (born 1965)	2024	Incumbent	–	Ulf Kristersson	

== List of deputy permanent representatives ==
Portrait	Name	Took office	Left office	Time in office	Ref.
Sven Fredrik Hedin	Counsellor of Embassy (Note: First embassy secretary 1963–1964 and embassy counsellor 1964–1965.); Sven Fredrik Hedin (1923–2004)	May 1964	1965	0–1 years	
Carl Johan Rappe	Minister; Carl Johan Rappe (1918–2010)	1965	1967	1–2 years	
Börje Billner	Minister; Börje Billner (1915–1972)	1967	1970	2–3 years	
Kaj Sundberg	Ambassador (Note: Minister 1970–1974 and ambassador 1974–1980.); Kaj Sundberg (1924–1993)	1970	1978	7–8 years	
Olov Ternström	Ambassador; Olov Ternström (1927–2001)	1978	1981	2–3 years	
Jan Lundvik	Minister; Jan Lundvik (born 1933)	1981	1985	3–4 years	
Sten Strömholm	Ambassador; Sten Strömholm (1930–1997)	1985	1989	3–4 years	
Lars-Göran Engfeldt	Ambassador; Lars-Göran Engfeldt (1944–2025)	1989	1993	3–4 years	
Henrik Salander [sv]	Ambassador (Note: Minister 1993–1995 and ambassador from 1995.); Henrik Salander (born 1945)	1993	1998	4–5 years	
Per Norström	Ambassador; Per Norström (born 1947)	1998	2001	2–3 years	
Inga Eriksson Fogh [sv; pl; uk]	Ambassador; Inga Eriksson Fogh (born 1950)	2001	2004	2–3 years	
Ulla Ström	Ambassador; Ulla Ström (born 1942)	2004	2008	3–4 years	
Per Örneus	Minister; Per Örneus (born 1962)	2008	2010	1–2 years	
Signe Burgstaller	Ambassador; Signe Burgstaller (born 1965)	September 2010	2014	3–4 years	
Per Thöresson [sv; de]	Ambassador; Per Thöresson (born 1962)	2014	2016	1–2 years	
Carl Skau	Ambassador; Carl Skau (born 1977)	September 2016	2017	0–1 years	
Irina Schoulgin Nyoni	Ambassador; Irina Schoulgin Nyoni (born 1969)	2017	2019	1–2 years	
Anna Karin Eneström	Ambassador; Anna Karin Eneström (born 1961)	2019	December 2019	–	
Magnus Lennartsson	Ambassador; Magnus Lennartsson (born 1961)	March 2020	September 2023	2–3 years	
Andreas von Uexküll	Ambassador; Andreas von Uexküll (born 1971)	2023	Incumbent	–	

== See also ==
- List of current permanent representatives to the United Nations
- Permanent Representative of Sweden to the United Nations in Geneva
