= Åke Sjölin =

Swedish diplomat (1910–1999)

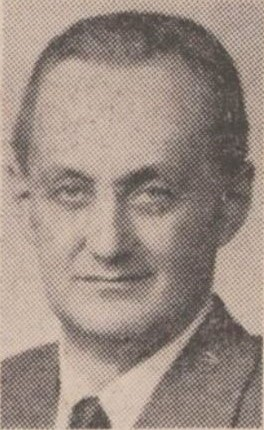
- Sjölin c. 1960s
- Born: Åke Magnus Valdemar Sjölin; 26 August 1910; Lindesberg, Sweden
- Died: 19 October 1999 (aged 89); Husby-Sjutolft, Sweden
- Education: Stockholm University College
- Occupation: Diplomat
- Years active: 1934–1976
- Spouse: Maud Selander (m. 1946)
- Children: 2

Åke Magnus Valdemar Sjölin (26 August 1910 – 19 October 1999) was a Swedish diplomat. Sjölin began his career in the Ministry for Foreign Affairs in 1937 and held diplomatic posts in the United States, Argentina, and Norway before becoming an ambassador in the Middle East in the late 1950s. He later served as ambassador in Africa and Asia, including South Vietnam, where he was Sweden’s last envoy before diplomatic relations changed in 1967. That same year, he became consul general in Berlin, a role he held until 1972, before concluding his career as ambassador to several West African nations from 1972 to 1976.

== Early life ==
Sjölin was born on 26 August 1910 in Lindesberg, Sweden, the son of mayor Magnus Sjölin and his wife Svea (née Rehnvall). He passed studentexamen in Lund in 1928 and received a Candidate of Law degree from Stockholm University College in 1933.

== Career ==
Sjölin completed his clerkship in Linde and Medelstad Judicial District from 1934 to 1936 before joining the Ministry for Foreign Affairs as an attaché in 1937. He was posted to Chicago in 1938, Washington, D.C. in 1939, and Buenos Aires in 1942. In 1943, he became second legation secretary in Buenos Aires and was later appointed first secretary at the Foreign Ministry in 1945. He was promoted to director (byråchef) in 1950 and served as embassy counsellor in Oslo from 1952 to 1957.

Sjölin was then appointed ambassador to Beirut, Damascus, and Amman from 1957 to 1958, and subsequently to Beirut and Amman from 1958 to 1960. From 1960 to 1964, he served as ambassador to Addis Ababa and Khartoum, while also representing Sweden in Mogadishu and Antananarivo from 1961 to 1964.

He then moved to Asia, serving as ambassador to Bangkok, Rangoon, Kuala Lumpur, and Saigon from 1964 to 1967, with additional responsibilities in Vientiane (1965–1967) and Singapore (1966–1967). In 1967, Sjölin became Sweden's last ambassador to South Vietnam, as the Swedish government chose not to seek agrément for a successor due to its stance on the Saigon regime.

Later that year, he was appointed consul general in Berlin, a position he held until 1972. He then served as ambassador to Rabat, Nouakchott, Dakar, and Banjul from 1972 to 1976.

== Personal life ==
In 1946, Sjölin married Maud Selander (1921–2018), the daughter of managing director Hjalmar Selander and Märta (née Russel). He is the father of the professor of medical psychology at the Karolinska Institutet, Åsa Nilsonne (born 1949) and Magnus Sjölin (1952–2018).

After retiring, Sjölin moved back home to Sweden and to the town of Grillby.

== Death ==
Sjölin died on 19 October 1999 in Husby-Sjutolft Parish in Enköping Municipality, Uppsala County. He was interred on 3 May 2000 at Husby-Sjutolft Cemetery.

== Awards and decorations ==
- (Sweden) Knight of the Order of the Polar Star
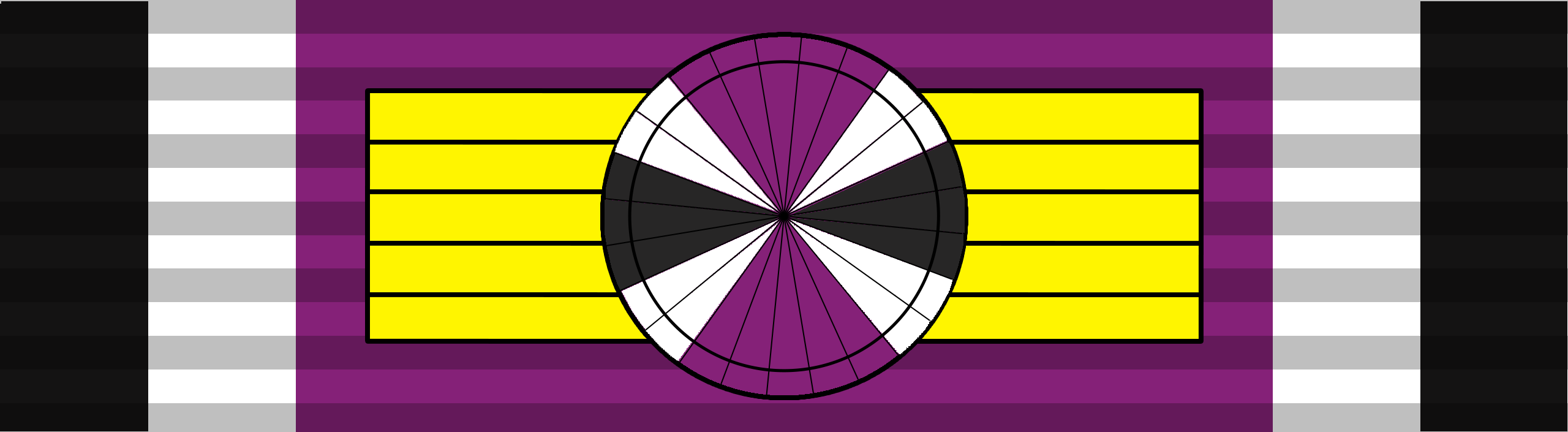
- (Jordan) Grand Cordon of the Order of Independence
- (Lebanon) Grand Cordon of the National Order of the Cedar
- (Chile) Commander of the Order of Merit
- (Mexico) Commander of the Order of the Aztec Eagle (21 March 1950)
- (Norway) Commander of the Order of St. Olav
- (Spain) Commander of the Order of Isabella the Catholic
- (Brazil) Officer of the Order of the Southern Cross
- (Ethiopian Empire) Ethiopian Red Cross Medal

Diplomatic posts
Preceded by Brynolf Eng	Envoy of Sweden to Lebanon; 1957–1960	Succeeded by Gösta Brunnström
Preceded by Brynolf Eng	Envoy of Sweden to Syria; 1957–1958	Succeeded by Gösta Brunnström (from 1960)
Preceded by None	Envoy of Sweden to Jordan; 1957–1960	Succeeded by Gösta Brunnström
Preceded by Eyvind Bratt	Ambassador of Sweden to Ethiopia; 1960–1964	Succeeded by Erland Kleen
Preceded by Eyvind Bratt	Ambassador of Sweden to Sudan; 1960–1964	Succeeded by Erland Kleen
Preceded by None	Ambassador of Sweden to Madagascar; 1961–1964	Succeeded by Erland Kleen
Preceded by None	Ambassador of Sweden to Somalia; 1961–1964	Succeeded by Adolf Croneborg
Preceded by Tord Hagen	Ambassador of Sweden to Thailand; 1964–1967	Succeeded by Axel Lewenhaupt
Preceded by Tord Hagen	Ambassador of Sweden to Burma; 1964–1967	Succeeded by Axel Lewenhaupt
Preceded by Louis De Geer	Ambassador of Sweden to Malaysia; 1964–1967	Succeeded by Axel Lewenhaupt
Preceded by Tord Hagen	Ambassador of Sweden to South Vietnam; 1964–1967	Succeeded by None
Preceded by None	Ambassador of Sweden to Laos; 1965–1967	Succeeded by Axel Lewenhaupt
Preceded by None	Ambassador of Sweden to Singapore; 1966–1967	Succeeded by Axel Lewenhaupt
Preceded by Sven Backlund	Consul general of Sweden in Berlin; 1967–1972	Succeeded by Carl Bergenstråhle
Preceded by Lars von Celsing	Ambassador of Sweden to Morocco; 1972–1976	Succeeded by Knut Bernström
Preceded by Lars von Celsing	Ambassador of Sweden to Mauritania; 1972–1976	Succeeded by Knut Bernström
Preceded by Lars von Celsing	Ambassador of Sweden to Senegal; 1972–1976	Succeeded by Knut Bernström
Preceded by Lars von Celsing	Ambassador of Sweden to the Gambia; 1972–1976	Succeeded by Knut Bernström
