= History of irrigation in Sudan =

Gezira Scheme - Al jazira state , Sudan Nov 1961

Sudan had a modern irrigated agriculture sector totaling about 800,000 hectares in 2010, out of about 84 million hectares that were potentially arable. This was a slight decline from the prior year and well below the more than 2 million hectares of the early 1990s. The Nile and its tributaries were the source of water for 93 percent of irrigated agriculture, and of this, the Blue Nile accounted for about 67 percent. Gravity flow was the main form of irrigation, although pumps served part of the irrigated area.

== History ==
The waters of the Nile in Sudan were used for centuries for traditional irrigation, taking advantage of the annual Nile flood. Such usage continued in the early 2000s, along with the traditional shaduf (a device to raise water) and waterwheel to lift water to fields in local irrigation projects. These devices were rapidly being replaced by more efficient mechanized pumps. Among the first efforts to employ irrigation for modern commercial cropping was the use of the floodwaters of the Qash River and the Barakah River (both of which originate in Eritrea) in eastern Sudan to grow cotton on their deltas. This project was started in the late 1860s by the Egyptian governor and continued until interrupted by the turbulent period of the 1880s. Cultivation resumed in 1896 in the Barakah Delta and after World War I in the Qash Delta. Between 1924 and 1926, canals were built in the latter delta to control the flood, but sandstorms made canals unfeasible in the Barakah. Between the 1940s and the 1970s, various projects were developed to irrigate land. Both deltas yielded only one crop a year, watered by the flood. Adequate groundwater, however, offered the eventual possibility of using pump irrigation from local wells for additional cropping or for supplementing any flood shortages.

The world's largest agricultural irrigation project under single management in 2010 operated on land between the Blue Nile and White Nile Rivers south of their confluence at Khartoum. This land has a gentle slope to the north and west, permitting natural gravity irrigation, and its soils are fertile cracking clays well suited to irrigation. The project originated in 1911 when a private British enterprise, Sudan Plantations Syndicate, found cotton suitable to the area and embarked in the 1920s on what became the Gezira Scheme, intended principally to furnish cotton to the British textile industry. Backed by a loan from the British government, the syndicate began to construct a dam on the Blue Nile at Sinnar (also seen as Sannar and Sennar) in 1913. Work was interrupted by World War I, and the dam was not completed until 1925. The project was limited by a 1929 agreement between Sudan and Egypt, which restricted the amount of water the Anglo-Egyptian Sudan could use during the dry season. By 1931 the project had expanded to 450,000 hectares, the maximum that could then be irrigated by the available water, although 10,000 more hectares were added in the 1950s. The project was nationalized in 1950 and operated thereafter by the Sudan Gezira Board as a government enterprise. In 1959 a new agreement with Egypt greatly increased the allotment of water to Sudan, as did the completion in the early 1960s of the Manaqil Extension on the western side of the Gezira Scheme. In 2010 the Gezira Scheme accounted for the great majority of the country's total land under irrigation.

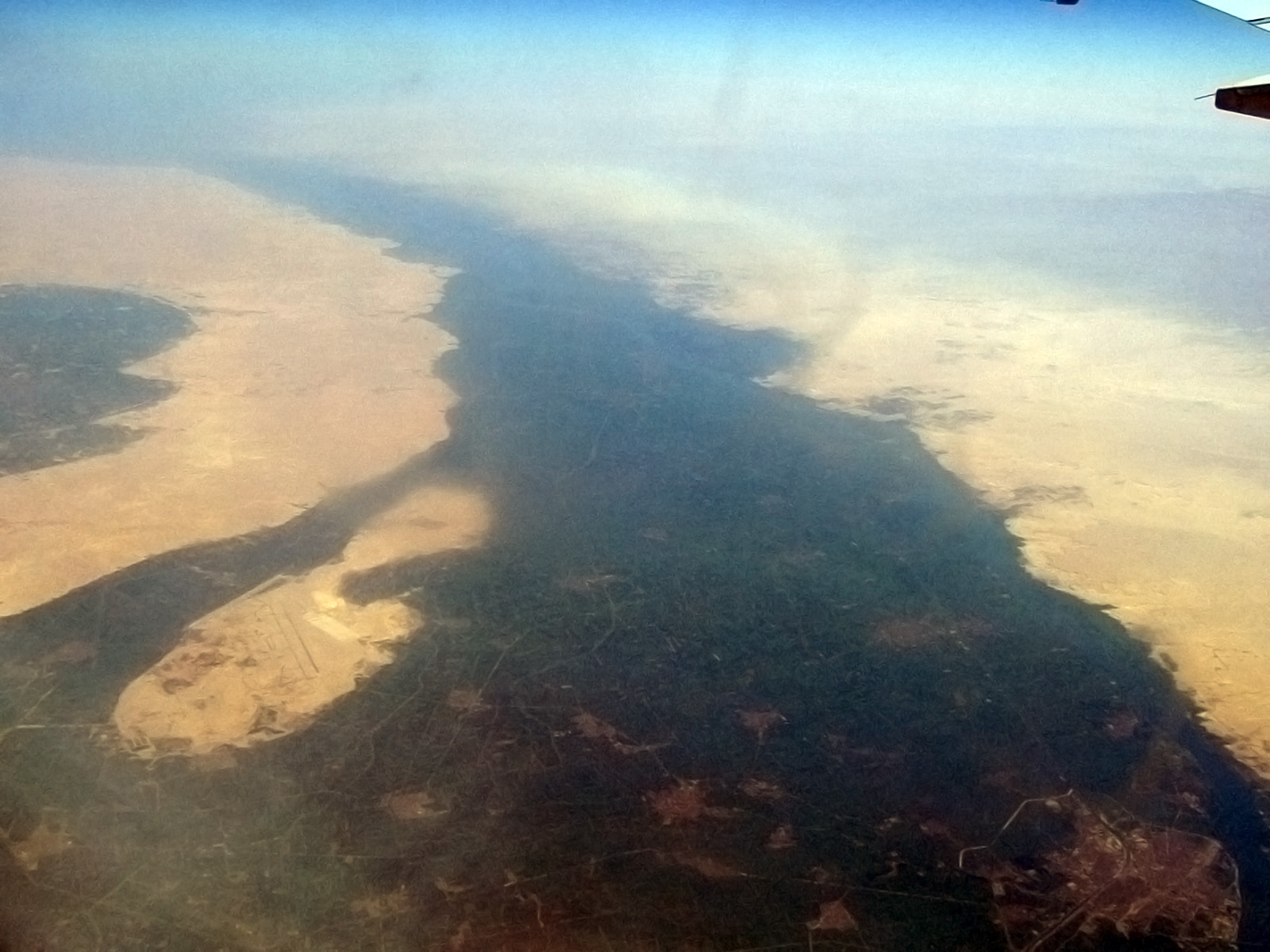
Irrigation of the Nile

The government set up a program in the early 1960s to resettle Nubians displaced by Lake Nubia (called Lake Nasser in Egypt), which was fonned by the construction of the Aswan High Dam in Egypt. To provide farmland for the Nubians, the government constructed the Khashm al-Qirbah Dam on the Atbarah River, a Nile tributary, and established the Haifa al-Jadidah (New Haifa) irrigation project. Located west of Kassala, this project was originally designed to irrigate about 164,000 hectares. Part of the irrigated area was assigned to local inhabitants. The main commercial crops initially introduced included cotton, peanuts, and wheat. In 1965 sugarcane was added, and a sugar factory having a design capacity of 60,000 tonnes was built to process it.

The multipurpose Roseires Dam was built in 1966, power-generating facilities being installed in 1971. Both the water and the power were needed to implement the Rahad River irrigation project located east of the Rahad River, a tributary of the Blue Nile. Work on the initial 63,000 hectares of the project began in the early 1970s, and the first irrigation water was received in 1977. As of 2009-10, the dam was being heightened in order to increase the amount of water for both irrigation and power generation.

Private irrigation projects using diesel pumps also began to appear in Al-Khartoum Province in the 1920s, mainly along the White Nile, to improve provision of vegetables, fruit, and other foods to the capital area.

In 1937 the Anglo-Egyptian Condominium government built a dam upstream from Khartoum on the White Nile at Jabal al-Awliya to regulate the supply of water to Egypt during the August to April period of declining flow. Grazing and cultivated land along the river was flooded for almost 300 kilometers. The government thereupon established seven pump-irrigation projects, partially financed by Egypt, to provide the area's inhabitants with an alternative to transhumance. This irrigation project eventually proved successful, making possible large surpluses of cotton and sorghum and encouraging private entrepreneurs to undertake new projects. High cotton profits during the Korean War (1950–53) increased private interest along the Blue Nile as well, and by 1958 almost half the country's irrigated cotton was grown under pump irrigation. During the 1960s, however, downward fluctuations in world cotton prices and disputes between entrepreneurs and tenants led to numerous failures of pump irrigation projects. In 1968 the government established the Agricultural Reform Corporation and assumed ownership and operation of the larger estates. Subsequently, as leases expired, the corporation acquired smaller projects, until May 1970, when all outstanding leases were revoked. A considerable number of small pump operations that developed on privately owned land, chiefly along the main Nile but also on the Blue Nile, continued to operate.

Since the 1950s, the government has constructed a number of large pump projects, mostly on the Blue Nile. These have included the Junayd project on the east bank of the Blue Nile east of the Gezira Scheme. This project, with an irrigated area of about 36,000 hectares, went into operation in 1955 with the aim of providing an alternative livelihood for nomadic pastoralists in the area. It just produced cotton until 1960, when about 8,400 hectares were converted to sugarcane. A sugar factory built to process the crop (with a potential capacity of 60,000 tonnes of sugar a year) opened in 1962. In the early 1970s, the As-Suki project, partially funded by Japan and also of 36,000 hectares, was established upstream from Sinnar to grow cotton, sorghum, and oilseeds. In the mid-1970s, the government constructed a second project near Sinnar of about 20,000 hectares. In addition to cotton and other crops such as peanuts, about 8,400 hectares of the area were devoted to raising sugarcane. The cane-processing factory, with a design capacity of 110,000 tonnes of sugar a year, opened in 1976. Several smaller Blue Nile projects added more than 80,000 additional hectares to Sudan's overall irrigated area during this time.

In the 1970s, when the consumption and import of sugar grew rapidly, domestic production became a priority. Consequently, two major pump-irrigated sugar plantations were established on the White Nile in the Kosti area. The Hajar Asalaya Sugar Project, begun in 1975, irrigated an area of about 7,600 hectares. A sugar-processing factory opened in 1977, with a potential annual capacity of 110,000 tonnes. The Kananah Sugar Project, which opened in 1981 with a potential of more than 33,000 hectares, was one of the world's largest sugar-milling and refining operations. The project, unlike the country's four other government-owned sugar projects, was a joint venture among the governments of Sudan, Kuwait, and Saudi Arabia, and the Arab Investment Company, the Sudan Development Corporation, Kananah Limited, and the Arab Authority for Agricultural Investment and Development; it also included local Sudanese banks.

The government's Dams Implementation Unit signed contracts in 2010 with two Chinese companies for a US$838 million project in northeastern Sudan. The Upper Atbarah Dams Complex Project would comprise two dams, on the Setit and the Atbarah, and the Upper Nile Dam. The project was part of the dam-construction program that included the building of the 1,250-megawatt Merowe Dam and the heightening of the Roseires Dam. The new dams were expected to contribute to the irrigation of some 210,000 hectares of agricultural land and to help revitalize land in the New Haifa Agricultural Scheme.
