= Swedish Pensioners' Association =

Charitable organisation

The Swedish Pensioners' Association (Swedish: Sveriges Pensionärsförbund, SPF) is a non-profit, politically and religiously independent, association of pensioners in Sweden, founded in 1939. It was initially called Sveriges Folkpensionärers Riksförbund (SFRF) but changed to its present name in 1986. As of February 2009 has over 257,000 members, divided into 857 clubs and 27 districts.

Although politically independent, it is seen as the pensioner's association preferred by non-socialists, as the competing organisation National Pensioners' Organisation has close ties to the Social Democratic Party.

Since 2017 its president is Eva Eriksson.
