= Embassy of Sweden, Bangkok =

- Location: Bangkok
- Address: 8th Floor, One Pacific Place; 140 Sukhumvit Road, between soi 4 and soi 6, Bangkok, Thailand
- Coordinates: 13.74085°N 100.55449°E
- Opened: 1959
- Ambassador: Anna Hammargren
- Jurisdiction: Thailand; Cambodia; Laos; Myanmar
- Website: Official website

Embassy of Sweden in Bangkok is Sweden's diplomatic mission in Thailand. The ambassador is also accredited to Cambodia, Laos and Myanmar. Sweden also has four honorary consulates in Thailand: in Phuket, Pattaya, Chiang Mai and Hua Hin.

== History ==
Diplomatic relations between Sweden and Thailand were established in 1868. Between 1931 and 1959, Sweden had a non-resident envoy accredited to Thailand from Japan and China. In July 1959, an agreement was reached between the Swedish and Thai governments on the mutual elevation of the respective countries' legations to embassies. In connection with this, Tord Hagen was appointed Sweden's first ambassador in Bangkok.

== Staff and tasks ==
=== Staff ===
The embassy in Bangkok is one of the largest Swedish embassies in Asia and the world, with a total of just over 70 employees, including both expatriate and locally hired staff.

=== Tasks ===
The Swedish Embassy in Bangkok has a broad range of responsibilities, covering Thailand, Myanmar, Laos, and Cambodia, where the ambassador is also accredited. In Myanmar, the embassy's section office in Yangon focuses on politics, development cooperation, and promoting Sweden. Cambodia hosts a section office for development cooperation, while Laos has an honorary consulate.

The embassy's development section in Bangkok manages extensive regional development cooperation in Asia and Oceania, emphasizing democracy, human rights, gender equality, climate, and the environment. The consular section prioritizes assisting Swedish citizens in Thailand, a popular destination for Swedish tourists, and the embassy handles a high volume of migration cases, including visas and residence permits. The political, trade, and promotion section monitors and reports on political developments in Thailand, including domestic and foreign policy, human rights, climate, environment, and economic issues. The embassy also collaborates with Business Sweden to support Swedish businesses in the region.

Additionally, the embassy promotes Swedish interests, including human rights, democracy, environmental sustainability, and gender equality. It also facilitates student and cultural exchanges. The defense section represents the Swedish Armed Forces and the broader defense community in Thailand. The embassy also includes a Nordic police and customs liaison office that works closely with Thai authorities on cross-border crime.

== Buildings ==
=== Chancery ===
The chancery was located on 231/2 Sathon Tai Road from 1960 to 1964. From 1965 to 1975, the chancery was located in the Silom Building, 197/1 Si Lom Road.

As of 2026, the embassy is located on the 8th Floor at One Pacific Place, 140 Sukhumvit Road.

=== Residence ===
The ambassadorial residence was located at 57 Soi Prasarnmitr, Bang Kapi district between 1965 and 1968. In 2024, the residence is located at Baan Suan Maak Apartment at 2-3 soi Patanasin, Nanglinchee Road in the subdistrict of Thung Maha Mek in the Sathon district.
