= List of ambassadors of Sweden to Namibia =

Ambassador of Sweden to Namibia
- Lesser coat of arms of the Kingdom of Sweden
- Incumbent; Anna Karin Eneström since 2025
- Ministry for Foreign Affairs; Swedish Embassy, Windhoek
- Style: His or Her Excellency (formal); Mr. or Madam Ambassador (informal)
- Reports to: Minister for Foreign Affairs
- Seat: Pretoria, South Africa (Note: The Swedish ambassador in Pretoria, South Africa is also accredited in Windhoek, Namibia.)
- Appointer: Government of Sweden
- Term length: No fixed term
- Inaugural holder: Sten Rylander
- Formation: July 1990

The Ambassador of Sweden to Namibia (known formally as the Ambassador of the Kingdom of Sweden to the Republic of Namibia) is the official representative of the government of Sweden to the president of Namibia and government of Namibia. Since Sweden does not have an embassy in Windhoek, Sweden's ambassador in Pretoria, South Africa, is also accredited to Windhoek.

== History ==
South West Africa was a territory under South African administration from 1915 to 1990. The United Nations renamed it Namibia in 1968, and the country became independent under that name on 21 March 1990.

In January 1989, it was reported that the Swedish government was planning to open a diplomatic mission in Namibia once South Africa granted the country independence. The following month, it was reported that three villas in Windhoek had been purchased for the Swedish Ministry for Foreign Affairs to be used as an embassy, an aid office, and diplomatic residences once Namibia became independent. The foreign ministry was also planning for two Swedish diplomats to be stationed in Windhoek as early as the end of March 1989.

However, the establishment of a Swedish diplomatic presence in Windhoek was a sensitive issue for the Swedish foreign ministry. At the time, the Swedish legation in South Africa had not yet received permission from the South African government to open another Swedish office, in addition to the mission in Pretoria and the consulates in Cape Town and Durban. South Africa continued to control Namibia, in cooperation with the United Nations, until the end of 1989. South Africa's reluctance to allow Swedish personnel to participate in the UN monitoring force in Namibia had also complicated matters.

Namibia became independent on 21 March 1990. Sweden was represented at the independence celebrations by Foreign Minister Sten Andersson and Minister for Development Cooperation Lena Hjelm-Wallén. In July 1990, Sten Rylander was appointed Sweden's first ambassador to Namibia, based in Windhoek. He was also appointed head of the development cooperation office at the embassy.

Sweden maintained a resident ambassador in Windhoek from 1990 to 2001. After 2001, the Swedish ambassador to Pretoria, South Africa, was also accredited to Namibia. An embassy counsellor served as head of mission and as chargé d'affaires ad interim whenever the ambassador was not present in Windhoek.

In 2008, the Swedish embassy in Namibia was closed as Sweden ended its regular development cooperation with the country that year, and Sida personnel left Namibia. The Swedish ambassador in Pretoria has remained accredited to Namibia.

== List of representatives ==
Name	Period	Resident/Non resident	Title	Notes	Presented credentials	Ref
Sten Rylander	1990–1995	Resident	Ambassador			
Ulla Ström	1995–1999	Resident	Ambassador			
Gunilla Hesselmark	1999–2001	Resident	Ambassador			
Helena Nilsson	2001–2005	Non-resident	Ambassador	Resident in Pretoria		
Göran Hedebro	2001–2005	Resident	Chargé d'affaires ad interim (Note: Held the diplomatic rank of embassy counsellor.)			
Anders Möllander	2005–2008	Non-resident	Ambassador	Resident in Pretoria		
Lena Johansson Blomstrand	2006–2008	Resident	Chargé d'affaires ad interim (Note: Held the diplomatic rank of embassy counsellor.)			
Peter Tejler	2008–2012	Non-resident	Ambassador	Resident in Pretoria		
Anders Hagelberg	2012–2016	Non-resident	Ambassador	Resident in Pretoria		
Cecilia Julin	2016–2020	Non-resident	Ambassador	Resident in Pretoria		
Håkan Juholt	2020–2025	Non-resident	Ambassador	Resident in Pretoria	27 November 2020	
Anna Karin Eneström	2025–present	Non-resident	Ambassador	Resident in Pretoria	15 June 2026	
