= List of ambassadors of Sweden to Botswana =

Ambassador of Sweden to Botswana
- Lesser coat of arms of the Kingdom of Sweden
- Incumbent; Anna Karin Eneström since 2025
- Ministry for Foreign Affairs; Swedish Embassy, Gaborone
- Style: His or Her Excellency (formal); Mr. or Madam Ambassador (informal)
- Reports to: Minister for Foreign Affairs
- Seat: Pretoria, South Africa (Note: The Swedish ambassador in Pretoria, South Africa is also accredited in Gaborone, Botswana.)
- Appointer: Government of Sweden
- Term length: No fixed term
- Inaugural holder: Eric Virgin
- Formation: 1969

The Ambassador of Sweden to Botswana (known formally as the Ambassador of the Kingdom of Sweden to the Republic of Botswana) is the official representative of the government of Sweden to the president of Botswana and government of Botswana. Since Sweden does not have an embassy in Gaborone, Sweden's ambassador in Pretoria, South Africa is co-accredited in Gaborone.

== History ==
On the occasion of the proclamation of the Bechuanaland Protectorate's independence under the name Botswana on 30 September 1966, Swedish Prime Minister Tage Erlander stated in a congratulatory telegram to President Seretse Khama that the Swedish government recognized Botswana as a sovereign and independent state and expressed the Swedish government's wish to maintain friendly relations with this country. Sweden was represented at Botswana's independence celebrations by Ambassador Dag Malm in Kinshasa, in the capacity of ambassadeur en mission spéciale.

From 1969, Sweden's envoy in Pretoria, South Africa, was also accredited to Gaborone, Botswana. In 1972, Sweden proposed establishing an embassy in Gaborone, to support its growing development cooperation. Although Botswana was small, economically dependent on South Africa, and had limited foreign ties, the government argued that direct representation was needed. The embassy was to be headed by an embassy counsellor as chargé d'affaires ad interim. The envoy in Pretoria remained accredited to Gaborone until 1974, when accreditation was transferred to the Swedish ambassador in Lusaka, Zambia. The ambassador in Lusaka was accredited to Botswana until the embassy in Gaborone became independent in 1979. The ambassador in Lusaka was accredited to Botswana until the embassy in Gaborone became independent in 1979.

When Irene Larsson was appointed the new Swedish ambassador in Gaborone on 28 June 1979, she became the sixth Swedish female ambassador in the history of the Ministry for Foreign Affairs. (Note: Larsson became the sixth Swedish female ambassador after Alva Myrdal (1955), Agda Rössel (1964), Inga Thorsson (1964), Cecilia Nettelbrandt (1978), and Ethel Wiklund (1978).) Between 1979 and 2001, the ambassador in Gaborone was also accredited to Maseru, Lesotho.

Since most of Sweden's aid to Botswana was phased out at the end of the 1990s, the embassy's most important tasks have been to maintain a dialogue with the country and monitor cooperation with the Southern African Development Community (SADC). On 15 November 2007, the Reinfeldt cabinet decided that the embassy would be phased out. The embassy was converted into an honorary consulate, and political and consular functions were taken over by Sweden's embassy in South Africa. The phase-out was expected to be completed by the end of May 2008. From the same year, Sweden's ambassador in Pretoria, South Africa, was again accredited to Gaborone.

== List of representatives ==
Name	Period	Resident / Non-resident	Title	Resident / Concurrent accreditation	Notes	Presented credentials	Ref
Eric Virgin	1969–1970	Non-resident	Envoy	Resident in Pretoria			
Carl Johan Rappe	1970–1973	Non-resident	Envoy	Resident in Pretoria			
Ethel Wiklund	1972–1975	Resident	Chargé d'affaires ad interim (Note: With diplomatic rank of embassy counsellor.)				
Iwo Dölling	1974–1975	Non-resident	Ambassador	Resident in Lusaka			
Bo Kälfors	1975–1978	Resident	Chargé d'affaires ad interim (Note: With diplomatic rank of embassy counsellor.)				
Ove Heyman	1976–1979	Non-resident	Ambassador	Resident in Lusaka			
Irene Larsson	1978 – 30 June 1979	Resident	Chargé d'affaires ad interim (Note: With diplomatic rank of embassy counsellor.)				
Irene Larsson	1 July 1979 – 1981	Resident	Ambassador	Also accredited to Maseru			
Karl-Göran Engström	1981–1985	Resident	Ambassador	Also accredited to Maseru			
Göran Zetterqvist	1985–1987	Resident	Ambassador	Also accredited to Maseru			
Folke Löfgren	1987–1992	Resident	Ambassador	Also accredited to Maseru			
Bengt Sparre	1992–1993	Resident	Chargé d'affaires ad interim				
Rasmus Rasmusson	1993–1996	Resident	Ambassador	Also accredited to Maseru (from 1994)			
Christina Rehlén	1997–2001	Resident	Ambassador	Also accredited to Maseru			
Birgitta Karlström Dorph	2001–2003	Resident	Ambassador				
Annika Jagander	2004–2007	Resident	Ambassador				
Peter Tejler	2008–2012	Non-resident	Ambassador	Resident in Pretoria			
Anders Hagelberg	2012–2016	Non-resident	Ambassador	Resident in Pretoria		September 2013	
Cecilia Julin	September 2016 – 2020	Non-resident	Ambassador	Resident in Pretoria		9 February 2017	
Håkan Juholt	September 2020 – 2025	Non-resident	Ambassador	Resident in Pretoria	Political appointee (non-career diplomat)	March 2022	
Anna Karin Eneström	2025–present	Non-resident	Ambassador	Resident in Pretoria		2 March 2026	
