= Håkan Juholt =

Swedish politician (born 1962)

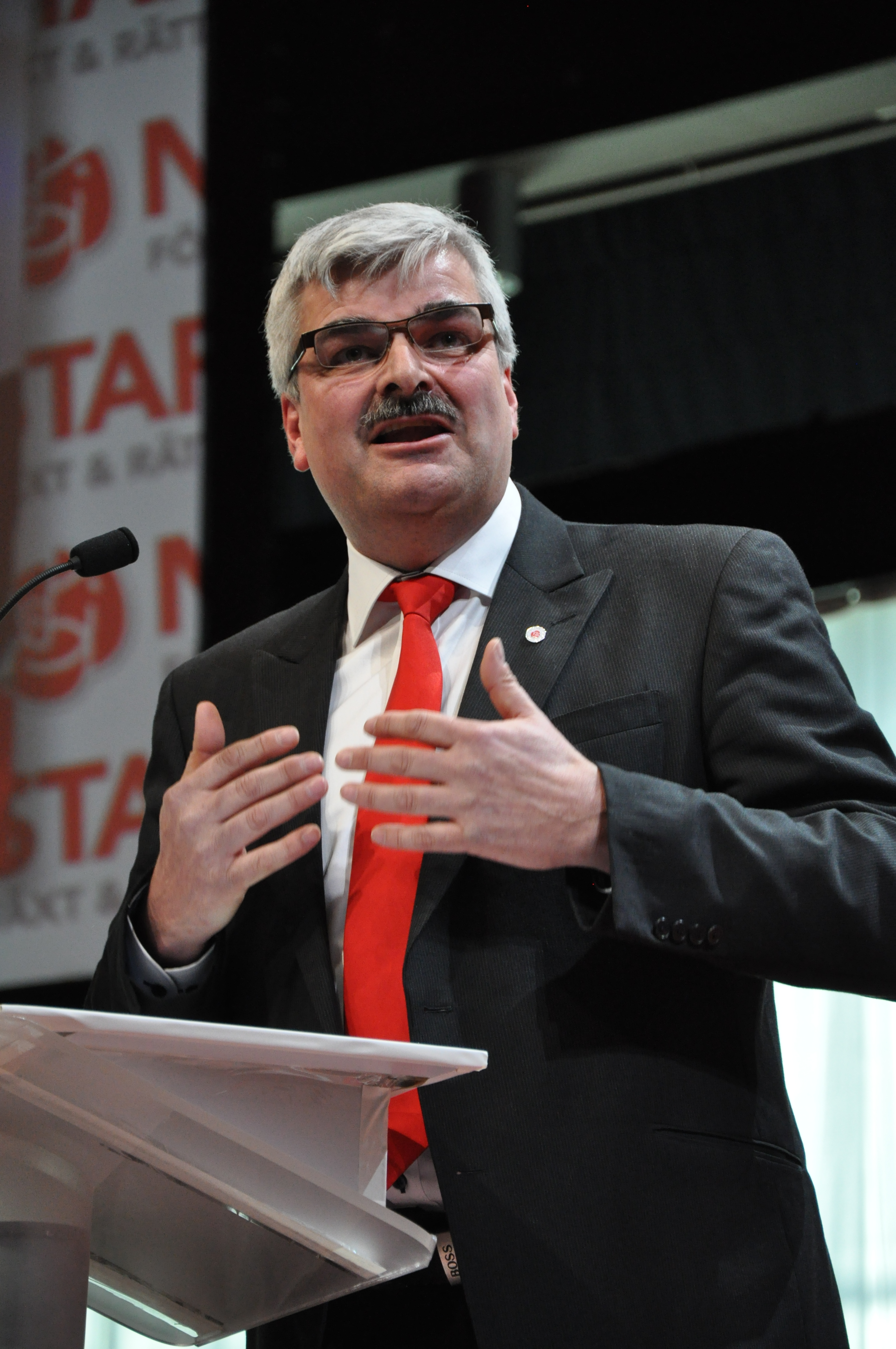
- Håkan Juholt in March 2011

Ambassador of Sweden to South Africa
- In office September 2020 – 15 August 2025
- Prime Minister: Stefan Löfven; Magdalena Andersson; Ulf Kristersson
- Preceded by: Cecilia Julin
- Succeeded by: Anna Karin Eneström

Ambassador of Sweden to Iceland
- In office 1 September 2017 – 31 August 2020
- Prime Minister: Stefan Löfven
- Preceded by: Bosse Hedberg
- Succeeded by: Pär Ahlberger

Leader of the Opposition
- In office 25 March 2011 – 21 January 2012
- Monarch: Carl XVI Gustaf
- Prime Minister: Fredrik Reinfeldt
- Preceded by: Mona Sahlin
- Succeeded by: Stefan Löfven

Leader of the Social Democratic Party
- In office 25 March 2011 – 21 January 2012
- Preceded by: Mona Sahlin
- Succeeded by: Stefan Löfven

Member of the Riksdag
- In office 3 October 1994 – 11 September 2016
- Constituency: Kalmar County

Personal details
- Born: 16 September 1962 (age 64) Oskarshamn, Sweden
- Party: Social Democratic
- Spouse(s): Anneli Juholt (divorced); Åsa Lindgren (m. 2014–present)
- Children: 2
- Education: Södertornskolan
- Profession: Journalist photographer

Håkan Juholt (born 16 September 1962) is a Swedish politician and diplomat who was Leader of the Social Democrats from 2011 to 2012. He was member of the Swedish parliament from 1994 to 2016, representing Kalmar County. Juholt served as Sweden's Ambassador to the Republic of Iceland from 2017 to 2020 and as Ambassador to the Republic of South Africa from 2020 to 2025.

== Early life and career ==
Juholt was born in Oskarshamn, a town of 17,000 on the Baltic Sea and the site of a nuclear power plant. His father worked in Oskarshamn as a printer and was a union man. His maternal grandfather was the artist Arvid Källström (1893–1967). After finishing gymnasium, he was hired in 1980 as a photographer and journalist for the Social Democratic Kalmar newspaper Östra Småland (Östran), where he is still formally employed but on leave since elected to parliament in 1994. In the early 1980s, he reported for the newspaper from the Solidarity movement in Poland.

== Political career ==
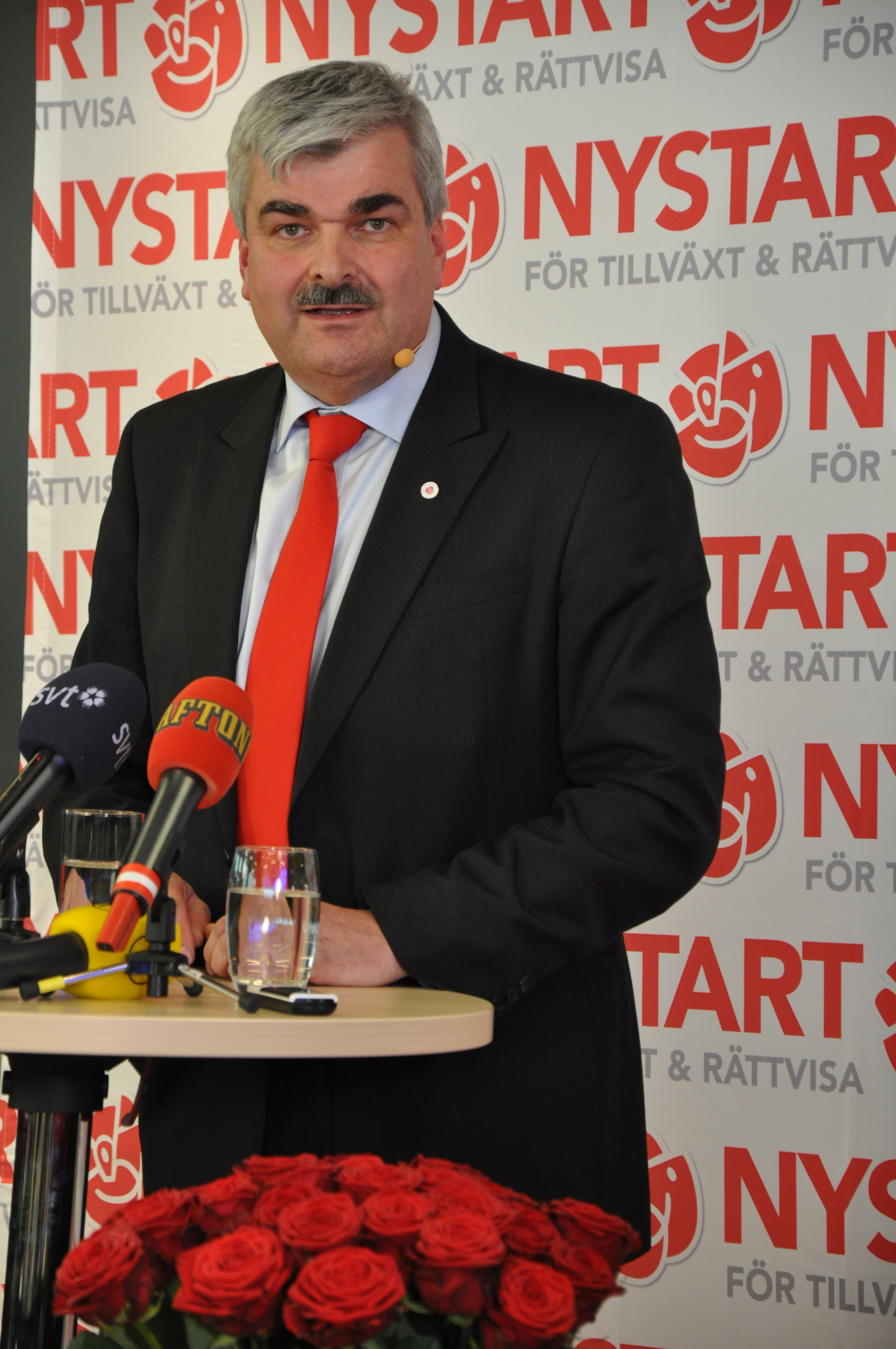
Juholt in March 2011, when he was elected as the new party chairman.

From 1984 to 1990 he was a board member of the Swedish Social Democratic Youth League (SSU). In 1994 he was elected to parliament. In 2004 he was appointed assistant party secretary. In the spring of 2009 he temporarily was the party secretary after Marita Ulvskog resigned and before Ibrahim Baylan took over. Until he became party leader, he was regional chairman of the Social Democrats of Kalmar län. He's chairman of the board for Oskarshamn's harbour, John Lindgren's peace fund, Tage Erlander's memorial fund and of the ownership board for the Östra Småland newspaper.

He was the party's spokesperson on defence policy. From 1995 he was a member of the joint parliament-government committee on defence policy (försvarsberedningen), and its chairman in 2000–2007. From 1996 to 2011, he was a member of the parliamentary committee on defence issues (försvarsutskottet), and served as its chairman 2010–2011. He was a delegate to the parliamentarian summits of NATO in 1995 and Organization for Security and Co-operation in Europe in 1996.

== Party chairman ==
After the Swedish parliamentary election in 2010, where the Social Democrats lost a significant number of votes, Håkan Juholt criticized the party's campaign. He described it as a popcorn pan, going in all directions. When Jytte Guteland, chairman of the party's youth league (SSU), called for the whole board to offer their resignation, he was the first to support her.

On 10 March 2011, he was proposed by the election committee led by Berit Andnor to succeed Mona Sahlin as the chairman of the party, with Carin Jämtin as the party secretary. Juholt's new leadership was elected during the Social Democratic Congress on 25 March 2011.

== Political scandal and resignation ==
The Swedish newspaper Aftonbladet published an article in October 2011 claiming that Juholt had, from 2007 until his time as head of the Swedish Social Democratic Party in 2011, requested SEK 160,266 too much in allowance for the residence he shares with his partner. As a result of the claim, he immediately paid the money back and stated that he wasn't aware of any rules. Later on, after the public reactions to the affair, the senior public prosecutor concluded that no such rules existed at the time.

The controversy seriously damaged the Social Democrats' poll ratings. There was heated debate in the media over both Juholt's and Aftonbladet's conduct.

Seven Social Democratic politicians called for Juholt to resign as party leader, despite having held that position for just half a year. However, Juholt stated his intent not to resign. There was some speculation in the aftermath that the whole affair was the result of internal conflicts among the Social Democrats, since there was a strong faction that wanted to get rid of Juholt.

On 14 October 2011, the Social Democrats' highest committee voted to support Juholt as head of the Social Democrats. The reason given was that the rules concerning the allowances were too unclear. On 21 January 2012, Juholt effectively announced his resignation as head of the Social Democrats at a news conference in Oskarshamn. He was succeeded by Stefan Löfven.

== Legacy ==
After his resignation, he continued serving for a short while as MP, until becoming appointed as Sweden's ambassador to Iceland and later South Africa. The detailed circumstances regarding his short chairmanship of the Social Democratic party has been portrayed in a documentary film ("Partiledaren som klev ut ur kylan") by Tom Alandh, in turn based on the book Partiledaren som klev in i kylan by author Daniel Suhonen. The book in particular describes the events leading up to Juholt's resignation as an intricate coup carried out by the party elite with close support from leading financial establishments in Sweden, such as the Wallenberg oligarchal family. Suhonen's source material includes secret recordings from meetings of the party's Executive Committee.

Party political offices
Preceded by Mona Sahlin	Leader of the Social Democrats; 2011–2012	Succeeded by Stefan Löfven
Diplomatic posts
Preceded by Bosse Hedberg	Ambassador of Sweden to Iceland; 2017–2020	Succeeded by Pär Ahlberger
Preceded by Cecilia Julin	Ambassador of Sweden to South Africa; 2020–2025	Succeeded by Anna Karin Eneström
Preceded by Cecilia Julin	Ambassador of Sweden to Botswana; 2020–2025	Succeeded by Anna Karin Eneström
Preceded by Cecilia Julin	Ambassador of Sweden to Lesotho; 2020–2025	Succeeded by Anna Karin Eneström
Preceded by Cecilia Julin	Ambassador of Sweden to Namibia; 2020–2025	Succeeded by Anna Karin Eneström
