= List of ambassadors of Sweden to Ethiopia =

Ambassador of Sweden to Ethiopia
- Lesser coat of arms of the Kingdom of Sweden
- Incumbent; Magnus Lennartsson since September 2025
- Ministry for Foreign Affairs; Swedish Embassy, Addis Ababa
- Style: His or Her Excellency (formal); Mr. or Madam Ambassador (informal)
- Reports to: Minister for Foreign Affairs
- Residence: Lideta, Kebele 07/14 (Note: The ambassador's residence is at the same location as the chancery.)
- Seat: Addis Ababa, Ethiopia
- Appointer: Government of Sweden
- Term length: No fixed term
- Inaugural holder: Widar Bagge
- Formation: 1945
- Website: Swedish Embassy, Addis Ababa

The Ambassador of Sweden to Ethiopia (known formally as the Ambassador of the Kingdom of Sweden to the Federal Democratic Republic of Ethiopia) is the official representative of the government of Sweden to the president of Ethiopia and government of Ethiopia. Sweden's ambassador to Ethiopia is also accredited to Djibouti and South Sudan and is Sweden's representative to the African Union (AU), which has its headquarters in Addis Ababa, the regional cooperation body Intergovernmental Authority on Development (IGAD), and the United Nations Economic Commission for Africa (UNECA).

== History ==
The Swedish representation in the Ethiopian Empire (Abyssinia) included a consulate from 1922 to 1936. In December 1929, the Swedish doctor Knut Hanner replaced the British subject A.D. Bethell as honorary consul and served until 1936. From 1936 to 1947, the Swedish legation in Cairo handled matters concerning Ethiopia.

In March 1945, Ato Abebe Retta, Haile Selassie's personal emissary, arrived in Stockholm to deliver a response to Crown Prince Gustaf Adolf's letter and to negotiate the employment of Swedes in Ethiopia. The Emperor's letter highlighted the valuable contributions of Swedish officers and Christian missions, expressing a desire for these efforts to resume when global conditions allowed. He also sought to establish diplomatic relations with Sweden, offering land and a residence in Addis Ababa for a Swedish Legation. In October of the same year, Envoy Widar Bagge was appointed as minister to Cairo, with accreditation also in Addis Ababa.

In the summer of 1948, Minister Bagge, who had been accredited in Addis Ababa, was recalled to Cairo. Gunnar Jarring served as Bagge's representative in Addis Ababa until August 1948, when he was appointed minister in New Delhi. Subsequently, Nils-Eric Ekblad was appointed chargé d'affaires in Addis Ababa, a diplomat of lower rank than a minister, reporting directly to Stockholm. Emperor Haile Selassie refused to acknowledge Bagge's recall, and the recall letter was deemed non-existent by the Imperial Chancellery.

From the perspective of the Swedish Ministry for Foreign Affairs, the appointment of a chargé d'affaires in Addis Ababa was seen as a strengthening of the diplomatic mission there. Ethiopia, however, held a different view, and in March 1949, it was reported that the ministry had abandoned this plan. Minister Bagge's recall letter was not delivered, meaning he would formally remain minister in Addis Ababa while continuing to be stationed in Cairo. In September 1950, Erik Wisén was appointed as Sweden's first resident envoy in Addis Ababa.

Since 1953, Sweden's ambassador to Ethiopia has been concurrently accredited to neighboring countries: Djibouti (1979–present), Eritrea (1993–1998), Madagascar (1961–1981), Mauritius (1977–1981), Somalia (1961–1964), South Yemen (1971–1981), and Sudan (1957–1966, 2002–2008). The ambassador is also accredited to the African Union in Addis Ababa and the Intergovernmental Authority on Development (IGAD) in Djibouti City.

In January 1960, an agreement was reached between the Swedish and Ethiopian governments on the mutual elevation of the respective countries' legations to embassies. The diplomatic rank was thereafter changed to ambassador instead of envoy extraordinary and minister plenipotentiary. Sweden's newly appointed minister there, Åke Sjölin, was appointed as ambassador.

== List of representatives ==
Name	Period	Title	Resident / Concurrent accreditation	Notes	Presented credentials	Ref
Ethiopian Empire (–1974)
Widar Bagge	1945–1950	Envoy	Resident in Cairo			
Per Anger	1946–1946	Chargé d'affaires ad interim (Note: Held the diplomatic rank of legation counselor.)				
Gunnar Jarring	1946–1946	Chargé d'affaires ad interim (Note: Held the diplomatic rank of acting legation counselor.)				
Nils-Eric Ekblad	1948–1950	Chargé d'affaires				
Erik Wisén	1950–1953	Envoy				
Eyvind Bratt	1953–1959	Envoy	Also accredited to Khartoum (from 1957)		16 October 1953	
Åke Sjölin	January 1960 (Note: Åke Sjölin was appointed chargé d'affaires en pied at the end of December 1959. In January 1960, an agreement was reached between the Swedish and Ethiopian governments on the mutual elevation of the respective countries' legations to embassies. Therefore, Sjölin's diplomatic rank was changed to ambassador. In April of the same year, Sjölin presented his credentials to Emperor Haile Selassie.)	Chargé d'affaires en pied				
Åke Sjölin	January 1960 – 1964	Ambassador	Also accredited to Antananarivo (from 1961), Khartoum, and Mogadishu (from 1961)			
Erland Kleen	1964–1967	Ambassador	Also accredited to Antananarivo and Khartoum (to 1966)			
Carl Bergenstråhle	1967–1972	Ambassador	Also accredited to Aden (from 1971) and Antananarivo			
Lars Hedström	1972–1974	Ambassador	Also accredited to Aden (from 1973) and Antananarivo (from 1973)			
Provisional Military Government of Socialist Ethiopia (1974–1987)
Lars Hedström	1974–1975	Ambassador	Also accredited to Aden and Antananarivo			
Bengt Friedman	1976–1978	Ambassador	Also accredited to Aden, Antananarivo, and Port Louis (from 1977)			
Arne Helleryd	1978–1982	Ambassador	Also accredited to Aden (1978–81), Antananarivo (1978–81), Djibouti (from 1979), and Port Louis (1978–81)			
Nils Revelius	1983–1987	Ambassador	Also accredited to Djibouti			
People's Democratic Republic of Ethiopia (1987–1991)
Nils Revelius	1987–1988	Ambassador	Also accredited to Djibouti			
Birgitta Karlström Dorph	1988–1991	Ambassador	Also accredited to Djibouti (from 1989)			
Transitional Government of Ethiopia (1991–1995)
Birgitta Karlström Dorph	1991–1993	Ambassador	Also accredited to Djibouti (from 1989)			
Ann Wilkens	1993–1995	Ambassador	Also accredited to Asmara and Djibouti			
Federal Democratic Republic of Ethiopia (1995–present)
Carl Olof Cederblad	1995–1998	Ambassador	Also accredited to Asmara and Djibouti			
Johan Holmberg	1999–2002	Ambassador	Also accredited to Djibouti			
Håkan Åkesson	2002–2005	Ambassador	Also accredited to Djibouti and Khartoum (Note: There are uncertainties regarding when Håkan Åkesson was accredited as ambassador to Khartoum. According to Sveriges statskalender (2005), he served as ambassador to Khartoum starting in 2002. However, Sveriges statskalender (2004) states that the Swedish ambassador to Cairo, Stig Elvemar, who was appointed in 2003, was accredited to Khartoum. That same edition also mentions that Håkan Åkesson was accredited to Khartoum from 2002. In Sveriges statskalender (2003), it is noted that the Swedish ambassador to, Sven Linder, was also accredited to Khartoum. In the same edition, it is stated that Håkan Åkesson only held a dual accreditation to Djibouti from 2002 and not to Khartoum.)			
Staffan Tillander	2005–2008	Ambassador	Also accredited to Djibouti and Khartoum			
Jens Odlander	2009–2013	Ambassador	Also accredited to Djibouti			
Jan Sadek	September 2013 – August 2017	Ambassador	Also accredited to Djibouti, African Union, and the IGAD			
Torbjörn Pettersson	1 September 2017 – 2020	Ambassador	Also accredited to Djibouti, African Union, and the IGAD			
Hans Henric Lundqvist	September 2020 – 2025	Ambassador	Also accredited to Djibouti, African Union, and the IGAD			
Magnus Lennartsson	2025–present	Ambassador	Also accredited to Djibouti, Juba, African Union, IGAD, and the UNECA		October 2025	

== See also ==
- Ethiopia–Sweden relations
