= List of ambassadors of Sweden to Eritrea =

Ambassador of Sweden to Eritrea
- Lesser coat of arms of the Kingdom of Sweden

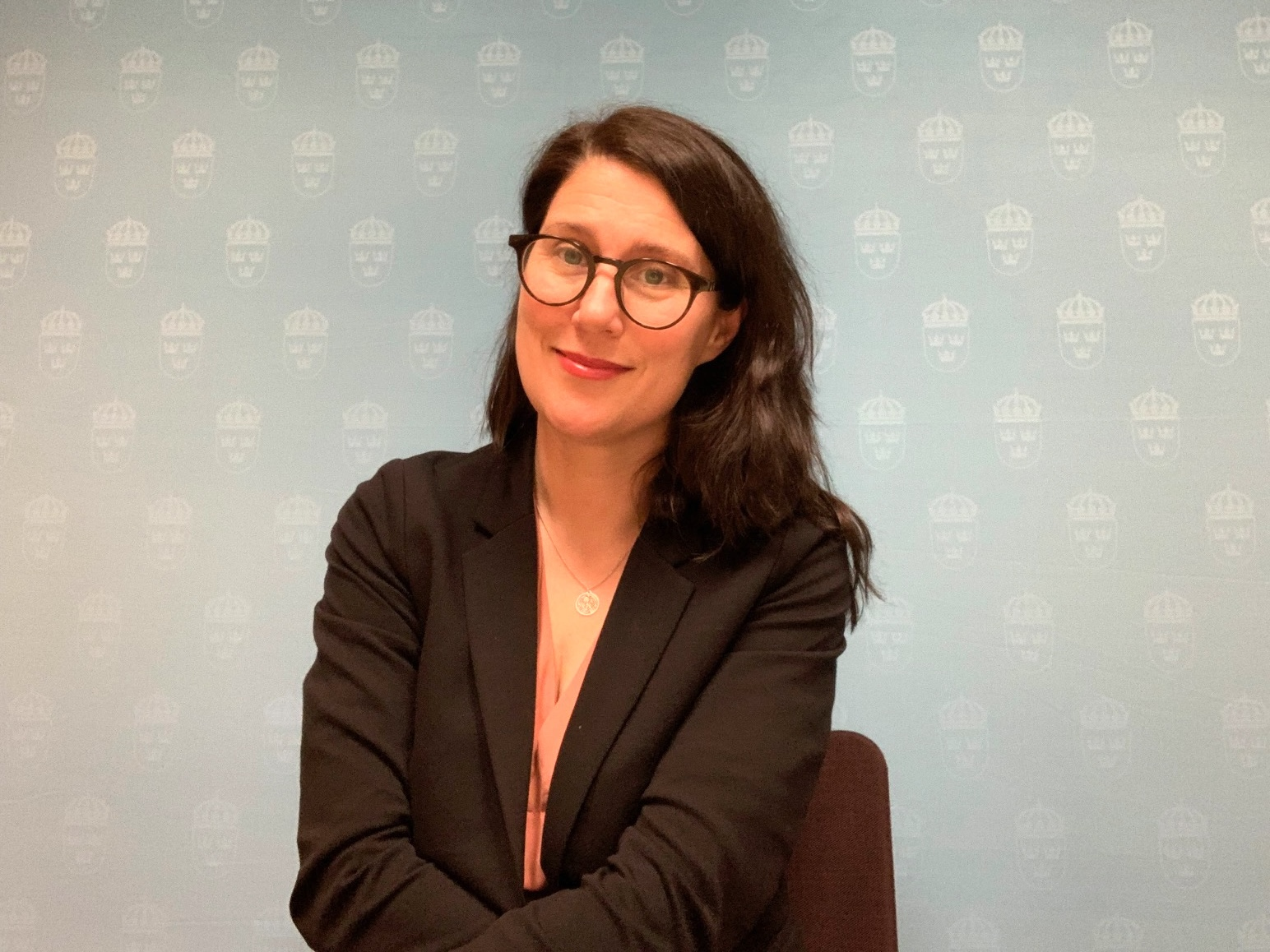
- Incumbent; Jenny Ohlsson since 1 October 2023
- Ministry for Foreign Affairs
- Style: His or Her Excellency (formal); Mr. or Madam Ambassador (informal)
- Reports to: Minister for Foreign Affairs
- Seat: Stockholm, Sweden (Note: The Swedish ambassador to Eritrea is resident in Stockholm, Sweden.)
- Appointer: Government of Sweden
- Term length: No fixed term
- Inaugural holder: Ann Wilkens
- Formation: 1993

The Ambassador of Sweden to Eritrea (known formally as the Ambassador of the Kingdom of Sweden to the State of Eritrea) is the official representative of the government of Sweden to the president of Eritrea and government of Eritrea. Since Sweden does not have an embassy in Asmara, Sweden's ambassador to Eritrea is resident in Stockholm, Sweden.

== History ==
Sweden recognized Eritrea as a sovereign and independent state on 24 May 1993. Sweden was represented at the independence celebrations in Eritrea's capital, Asmara, by the State Secretary at the Ministry for Foreign Affairs' Department for Development Cooperation, Alf Samuelsson, and the ambassador in Addis Ababa, Birgitta Karlström Dorph.

On 17 June 1993, the Swedish government decided to conclude an agreement with Eritrea on the establishment of diplomatic relations in Asmara on 11 June and in Stockholm on 21 June 1993. The agreement entered into force on 24 June 1993 through an exchange of notes. The agreement was signed by Sweden's Minister for Foreign Affairs, Margaretha af Ugglas, and Eritrea's Minister for Foreign Affairs, Mahmoud Ahmed Sherifo.

During the first years, from 1993 to 1998, Sweden's ambassador in Addis Ababa, Ethiopia, was concurrently accredited to Asmara, Eritrea. After that, the post remained vacant for a number of years before being filled in 2003 by a Stockholm-based ambassador, who has since been resident in Stockholm.

== List of representatives ==
Name	Period	Title	Resident / Concurrent accreditation	Notes	Presented credentials	Ref
Ann Wilkens	1993–1995	Ambassador	Resident in Addis Ababa			
Carl Olof Cederblad	1995–1998	Ambassador	Resident in Addis Ababa			
–	1999–2003	Ambassador		Vacant		
Folke Löfgren	2003–2005	Ambassador	Resident in Stockholm		February 2004	
Bengt Sparre	2005–2006	Ambassador	Resident in Stockholm			
–	2007–2007	Ambassador		Vacant		
Fredrik Schiller	17 January 2008 – 2012	Ambassador	Resident in Stockholm		September 2008	
Annika Molin Hellgren	2012–2015	Ambassador	Resident in Stockholm		June 2013	
Per Enarsson	12 February 2015 – 2019	Ambassador	Resident in Stockholm		February 2016	
Svante Liljegren	31 January 2019 – 2023	Ambassador	Resident in Stockholm		December 2019	
Jenny Ohlsson	1 October 2023 – present	Ambassador	Resident in Stockholm		17 November 2023	
