= Ann Wilkens =

Swedish journalist and diplomat

Her Excellency Ann Wilkens
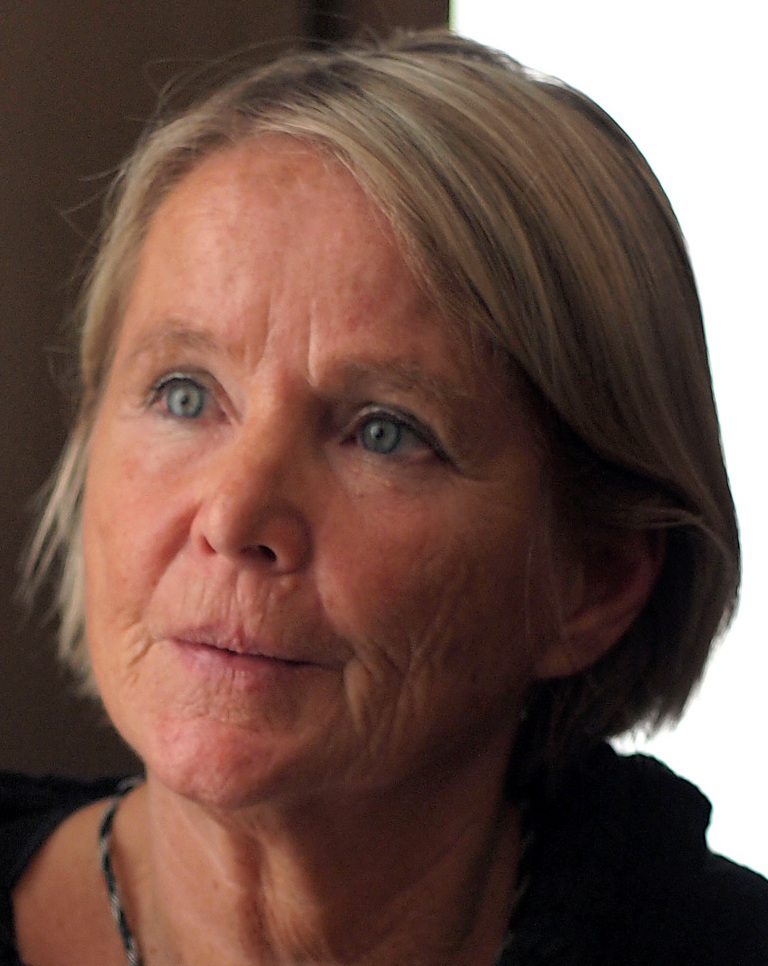
- Wilkens in 2012

Ambassador of Sweden to Pakistan
- In office 2007–2003
- Preceded by: Peter Tejler
- Succeeded by: Anna Karin Eneström

Ambassador of Sweden to Luxembourg
- In office 2000–2003
- Preceded by: Lennart Watz
- Succeeded by: Agneta Söderman

Ambassador of Sweden to Ethiopia
- In office 1993–1995
- Preceded by: Birgitta Karlström Dorph
- Succeeded by: Carl Olof Cederblad

Personal details
- Born: Ann Märta Wilkens; 7 April 1944 (age 82) Gothenburg, Sweden
- Parent: Sten Wilkens (father)
- Education: Columbia School of Journalism (MSc)
- Occupation: Journalist and diplomat

Ann Märta Wilkens (born 7 April 1944) is a retired Swedish journalist and diplomat who became the ambassador to Ethiopia from 1993 to 1995, Luxembourg from 2000 to 2003, Pakistan and Afghanistan from 2003 to 2007. She sits on the AAN Advisory Board. Her expertise is in media and diplomacy. She was the president of the Swedish Committee for Afghanistan from 2009 to 2011, and she now works as an independent political analyst.

== Education ==
Wilkens graduated with Masters of Science (honours) from the Columbia School of Journalism in New York, United States.

== Diplomatic career ==
Wilkens joined the Foreign Ministry in the 1970s and cooperated with the South African liberation movement. Nonetheless, she would witness the end of apartheid. The events in South Africa have given her hope that the world can change and that it was worth fighting for. She lived in Pakistan several years and traveled extensively throughout Afghanistan. She coauthored an analytical essay on Pakistan's choice not to intervene militarily in Yemen for AAN.

Wilkens was the president of the Swedish Committee for Afghanistan from 2009 to 2011, and the Swedish branch of Transparency International from 2011 to 2013. Among her many publications are studies on the Pakistan/Afghanistan region, such as "Suicide Bombers and Society" and "Missing the Target: A Report on the Swedish Commitment to Women, Peace, and Security in Afghanistan." She serves on the advisory board of the ANN.

=== Pakistan ===
Wilkens stated that while commercial links between Sweden and Pakistan were growing, there was still a lot of untapped potential in areas such as politics, commerce, culture, and development cooperation. In 2005, she addressed a seminar on "Export Market – Sweden" at the Sialkot Chamber of Commerce and Industry (SCCI), stating that the goal of the event was to present Sweden as an export market to the Sialkot business community and to pass on some information on how to access the Swedish market. Wilkens was convinced that hosting seminars to introduce Sweden as a market for Pakistani exporters in the country's key commercial hub of Sialkot would usher in a new chapter in Sweden-Pakistan business relations.

=== Afghanistan ===
Wilkens of the Swedish Committee for Afghanistan, who was more pessimistic about the prospects for peace than the other two debaters, believes that it is now just a matter of time before the troops leave the country, and that the debate must now focus on what comes next. The question of discussions with the Taliban sparked the most intense argument. Unofficial talks with the Karzai government are already beginning, but Wilkens refused to acknowledge that a peace agreement was even possible, let alone acceptable. "The fight is about values," she remarked, drawing parallels to World War II.

On 7 December 2012, policymakers, regional specialists, and media convened in Brussels, including Wilkens, to debate Afghanistan and Pakistan beyond 2014: The Role of Regional Powers. The first panelist, Wilkens, warned of major fault lines running through Pakistani society and projected that "either good or bad elections in Pakistan in 2014 could set an example for the region."

After the Taliban takeover of Afghanistan in 2021, Taliban commanders have taken an outwardly softer attitude on several subjects, such as permitting women to be educated. Wilkens adds that the Taliban movement was decentralised, and that local leaders have made decisions that contradict what the leadership has expressed, such as barring women from educational institutions in some areas.

Diplomatic posts
Preceded by Birgitta Karlström Dorph	Ambassador of Sweden to Ethiopia; 1993–1995	Succeeded by Carl Olof Cederblad
Preceded by Birgitta Karlström Dorph	Ambassador of Sweden to Djibouti; 1993–1995	Succeeded by Carl Olof Cederblad
Preceded by None	Ambassador of Sweden to Eritrea; 1993–1995	Succeeded by Carl Olof Cederblad
Preceded by Lennart Watz	Ambassador of Sweden to Luxembourg; 2000–2003	Succeeded by Agneta Söderman
Preceded by Peter Tejler	Ambassador of Sweden to Pakistan; 2003–2007	Succeeded by Anna Karin Eneström
Preceded by Peter Tejler	Ambassador of Sweden to Afghanistan; 2003–2007	Succeeded by Anna Karin Eneström
