= Arvid Källström =

Swedish sculptor

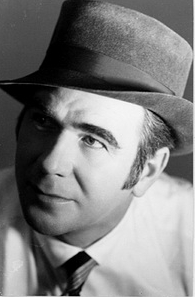
- Arvid Källström1 in 1943
- Born: 17 February 1893; Oskarshamn, Sweden
- Died: 27 October 1967 (aged 74); Oskarshamn, Sweden
- Occupation: Sculptor
- Relatives: Håkan Juholt (grandson)

Arvid Källström (17 February 1893 – 27 October 1967) was a Swedish sculptor. His work was part of the art competitions at the 1932 Summer Olympics and the 1936 Summer Olympics. He was the maternal grandfather of Håkan Juholt.
