= List of ambassadors of Sweden to South Africa =

Ambassador of Sweden to South Africa
- Lesser coat of arms of the Kingdom of Sweden
- Incumbent; Anna Karin Eneström since 2025
- Ministry for Foreign Affairs; Swedish Embassy, Pretoria
- Style: His or Her Excellency (formal); Mr. or Madam Ambassador (informal)
- Reports to: Minister for Foreign Affairs
- Residence: 297 Canopus Street, Waterkloof Ridge
- Seat: Pretoria, South Africa
- Appointer: Government of Sweden
- Term length: No fixed term
- Inaugural holder: Harry Eriksson
- Formation: 1944
- Website: Swedish Embassy, Pretoria

The Ambassador of Sweden to South Africa (known formally as the Ambassador of the Kingdom of Sweden to the Republic of South Africa) is the official representative of the government of Sweden to the president of South Africa and government of South Africa.

== History ==
In 1944, the Swedish consulate general in Pretoria was upgraded to a legation and Harry Eriksson was appointed Sweden's first envoy in South Africa.

On 1 November 1993, after Nelson Mandela was released from prison, the Swedish legation was upgraded to an embassy, as one of the last legations in the world. The diplomatic rank was thereafter changed to ambassador instead of envoy extraordinary and minister plenipotentiary.

== List of representatives ==
Name	Period	Title	Resident / Concurrent accreditation	Notes	Presented credentials	Ref
Union of South Africa (1910–1961)
Harry Eriksson	1944–1945	Acting envoy				
Harry Eriksson	1945–1948	Envoy				
Carl Olof Gisle	1948–1954	Envoy				
Alexis Aminoff	1954–1959	Envoy				
Eyvind Bratt	1959–1961	Envoy			October 1960	
Republic of South Africa (1961–present)
Eyvind Bratt	1961–1963	Envoy			October 1960	
Hugo Tamm	1964–1966	Envoy				
Eric Virgin	1966–1970	Envoy	Also acreddited to Gaborone (from 1969) and Maseru (from 1968).			
Carl Johan Rappe	1970–1973	Envoy	Also acreddited to Gaborone, Maseru and Mbabane.			
Lennart Westerberg	1973–1978	Envoy	Also acreddited to Maseru (until 1978) and Mbabane (until 1977).			
Gustaf Hamilton af Hageby	1978–1982	Envoy				
Arne Helleryd	1982–1985	Envoy				
Jan Lundvik	1985–1990	Envoy				
Ingemar Stjernberg	1990–1993	Envoy				
Ingemar Stjernberg	1993–1994	Ambassador				
Bo Heinebäck	1994–2000	Ambassador	Also accredited to Port Louis (from 1999)			(Note: Spiegelberg (2000), p. 184, claims that Heinebäck was accredited to Port Louis, Mauritius from 1994—the same year he was appointed ambassador to South Africa—whereas Jönsson (2000), p. 474, states that the year was 1999.)
Helena Nilsson Lannegren	2000–2005	Ambassador	Also acreddited to Maseru and Windhoek (both from 2001).	Political appointee (non-career diplomat)		
Anders Möllander	2005–2008	Ambassador	Also acreddited to Maseru and Windhoek. (Note: The Swedish embassy in Luanda and Gaborone were planned to close in 2008 and the same year the responsibility would be transferred to the Swedish embassy in Pretoria. However, the decision to close the embassy in Luanda was changed the same year and it remained open.)			
Peter Tejler	2008–2012	Ambassador	Also acreddited to Maseru, Gaborone, and Windhoek.			
Anders Hagelberg	2012–2016	Ambassador	Also acreddited to Gaborone.		29 January 2013	
Cecilia Julin	September 2016 – 2020	Ambassador	Also acreddited to Maseru, Gaborone, SADC, and Windhoek.			
Håkan Juholt	September 2020 – 2025	Ambassador	Also acreddited to Maseru, Gaborone, SADC, and Windhoek.	Political appointee (non-career diplomat)	19 November 2020	
Anna Karin Eneström	2025–present	Ambassador	Also acreddited to Maseru, Gaborone, and Windhoek.		2 October 2025	

== See also ==
- South Africa–Sweden relations
- Embassy of Sweden, Pretoria
