= Birgitta Karlström Dorph =

Swedish diplomat

Her Excellency Birgitta Karlström Dorph

Ambassador of Sweden to Botswana
- In office 2001–2003
- Preceded by: Christina Rehlén
- Succeeded by: Annika Jagander

Ambassador of Sweden to Ethiopia
- In office 1988–1993
- Preceded by: Nils Revelius
- Succeeded by: Ann Wilkens

Personal details
- Born: Märta Birgitta Karlström Dorph; June 5, 1939 (age 87) Karlstad, Sweden
- Children: 5
- Education: Stockholm School of Economics
- Occupation: Diplomat

Birgitta Karlström Dorph (born 5 June 1939) is a Swedish diplomat. She is mostly known for her clandestine work in channeling funds from the Swedish government to the anti-apartheid movement in South Africa during the 1980s.

== Early life and education ==
Märta Birgitta Karlström Dorph grew up in Karlstad where she went to the Tingvallagymnasiet. After graduating she studied in the United States, attended the Stockholm School of Economics and worked in France. She finally entered an education at the Ministry for Foreign Affairs where she remained and worked as a diplomat for 44 years.

== Career ==
During twenty of Karlström Dorph's years within the diplomatic corps she worked in Africa where she was stationed in Addis Ababa, Ethiopia and Gaborone, Botswana, among other places. In 1982–88, she worked in Pretoria, South Africa.

== Secret mission ==
While stationed as second in command at the Swedish legation (Note: At the time the Swedish embassy in South Africa was called a "legation".) in Pretoria and working as a diplomat, she also had a secret mission. Her job was to get in contact with the leaders of the then prohibited anti-apartheid movement in South Africa and Namibia, and find ways to transfer money from Sweden to support their cause. The operation was initiated by Olof Palme and the Swedish government. These arrangements were clandestine and were not discussed in public in the Riksdag. A total sum of about SEK 1.6 billion ($200 million) were transferred to the African National Congress and other organizations. Karlström Dorph established a contact net of recipients and ways to transfer the money. Information about the transfers were sent as encrypted telegrams, by couriers or as hidden messages in gifts. The money came mainly from the humanitarian government agency Swedish International Development Cooperation Agency (SIDA) but could not be channeled directly since officially, Sweden was not giving any aid to South Africa.

A significant part of the money was used for legal help in defending black persons accused of breaking any of the apartheid laws that were in effect at the time. This help led to a number of people escaping the death penalty, or had their jail sentences drastically reduced. Money also went to churches, newspapers, unions and women's organizations and the United Democratic Front.

"I used my ears, my eyes, all my senses, and my heart." (about knowing who to trust during her secret mission)

— Birgitta Karlström Dorph

== Recognitions ==
Karlström Dorph has been celebrated as a hero among the South African anti-apartheid activists and she was invited to a birthday party for Nelson Mandela as well as the ANC's centennial celebration.

In 2015, the Sveriges Television made a documentary about Karlström Dorph called Palmes hemliga agent ("Palme's secret agent").

== Personal life ==
Karlström Dorph has five children and her husband is deceased. She had kept her mission in South Africa a secret from her family up until the documentary about her was made. She says that when her children saw the film "They clapped their hands and gave me a high five!"

As of 2015, she still works for the Ministry for Foreign Affairs from time to time. She currently lives in Stockholm.

== Notes ==
Diplomatic posts
Preceded by Nils Revelius	Ambassador of Sweden to Ethiopia; 1988–1993	Succeeded by Ann Wilkens
Preceded by Nils Revelius	Ambassador of Sweden to Djibouti; 1989–1993	Succeeded by Ann Wilkens
Preceded by Christina Rehlén	Ambassador of Sweden to Botswana; 2001–2003	Succeeded by Annika Jagander
