= List of ambassadors of Sweden to Djibouti =

Ambassador of Sweden to Djibouti
- Lesser coat of arms of the Kingdom of Sweden
- Incumbent; Magnus Lennartsson since 2025
- Ministry for Foreign Affairs
- Style: His or Her Excellency (formal); Mr. or Madam Ambassador (informal)
- Reports to: Minister for Foreign Affairs
- Seat: Addis Ababa, Ethiopia (Note: The Swedish ambassador to Djibouti is based in Addis Ababa, Ethiopia.)
- Appointer: Government of Sweden
- Term length: No fixed term
- Inaugural holder: Arne Helleryd
- Formation: August 1979

The Ambassador of Sweden to Djibouti (known formally as the Ambassador of the Kingdom of Sweden to the Republic of Djibouti) is the official representative of the government of Sweden to the president of Djibouti and government of Djibouti. Since Sweden does not have an embassy in Djibouti City, Sweden's ambassador to Djibouti is based in Addis Ababa, Ethiopia.

== History ==
In August 1979, Sweden's ambassador in Addis Ababa, Arne Helleryd, was also accredited to Djibouti City. Both countries established diplomatic relations on 20 February 1980, when Helleryd presented his credentials to President Hassan Gouled Aptidon. Since then, Sweden's ambassador in Addis Ababa has been accredited to Djibouti City.

== List of representatives ==
Name	Period	Title	Resident / Concurrent accreditation	Notes	Presented credentials	Ref
Arne Helleryd	August 1979 – 1982	Ambassador	Resident in Addis Ababa		20 February 1980	
Nils Revelius	1983–1988	Ambassador	Resident in Addis Ababa			
Birgitta Karlström Dorph	1989–1993	Ambassador	Resident in Addis Ababa			
Ann Wilkens	1993–1995	Ambassador	Resident in Addis Ababa			
Carl Olof Cederblad	1995–1998	Ambassador	Resident in Addis Ababa			
Johan Holmberg	1999–2002	Ambassador	Resident in Addis Ababa			
Håkan Åkesson	2002–2005	Ambassador	Resident in Addis Ababa			
Staffan Tillander	2005–2008	Ambassador	Resident in Addis Ababa			
Jens Odlander	2009–2013	Ambassador	Resident in Addis Ababa			
Jan Sadek	2013–2017	Ambassador	Resident in Addis Ababa			
Torbjörn Pettersson	2017–2020	Ambassador	Resident in Addis Ababa			
Hans Henric Lundqvist	2020–2025	Ambassador	Resident in Addis Ababa		22 March 2021	
Magnus Lennartsson	2025–present	Ambassador	Resident in Addis Ababa			
