= Embassy of Sweden, Prague =

Sweden Embassy in Prague

- Location: Prague
- Address: Úvoz 13; Prag 1- Hradčany
- Coordinates: 50°5′15.11″N 14°23′27.54″E
- Opening: 1921
- Ambassador: Håkan Jevrell
- Jurisdiction: Czech Republic
- Website: Official website

The Embassy of Sweden (Czech: Švédské velvyslanectví v Praze) in Prague is Sweden's diplomatic mission in the Czech Republic. It is located on Úvoz street, in Hradčany, the castle region of Prague. The embassy's staff work with various issues in several areas – politics, economy, press and information, culture, administration and consular affairs as well as defence issues.

== History ==
In a report on the reorganization of the Ministry of Foreign Affairs in early January 1921, the experts recommended the establishment of a mission in Prague. Sweden established its first mission in Prague the same year and until World War II it was a tenant in the Lažansky Palace on the banks of the Vltava River in Old Town. The first Swedish diplomat accredited to Prague was envoy Gerhard Löwen in 1921. The mission was located at Sněmovní street 5 from 1922 to 1936. In 1937, the address was Panská street 9, Prag III, and 1938–1939 the address was again Sněmovní street 5. After the war, the legation again operated from Sněmovní street 5 from 1946 to 1947.

In 1946, the embassy moved to where it is located today, on Úvoz 13. In everyday speech, the building has always been called Na Krásné Vyhlidce – the beautiful view. It was built in 1928–29 by Dr. Josef Růžička and his wife Anna. They borrowed money from Joseph's father and showed their gratitude by having a bronze portrait of him engraved on the facade facing the garden. This was done by the best engraver in Prague – Otakar Španiel – and it is still in place. The idyll in the house lasted only ten years and was broken by the Nazi occupation. Several of the residents of the house were expelled or killed by the Nazis, including Josef Růžička, who died in the Mauthausen concentration camp.

During the 1948 Czechoslovak coup d'état, this house, like all other real estate, was confiscated. The house was divided and taken over by a couple of relatives. The former owner's daughter, who owned half the house, emigrated to California, but her mother Anna Růžička and mother-in-law were able to stay. The Swedish embassy continued to rent the house, but now from the Czech state. The Swedish state was offered to buy the house but they refused because it was considered that the house had been confiscated illegally. In the 1970s, the embassy building was in need of renovation, but Czechoslovakia's relationship with Sweden was frozen solid after Olof Palme likened the communist regime to "the cattle of dictatorship". The question of the property's fate was delayed. Only after informal meetings between Swedish and Czechoslovak officials did a renovation take place. Then, if not before, the hidden microphones that were later discovered and shown at the Nordic Museum's exhibition Spies in 1999 were installed.

When the communist regime fell, the Czech state returned all real property to previous owners - Růžička's dotter Tatiana och sonen Primus. The Růžička family got their palace back. The now seventy-year-old lady in California donated her share, half the house, to the Swedish state. The Swedish state bought the other half of the palace from sonens familj for SEK 15 million. Since 1993, the Swedish state owns the house.

On 26 January 2015, the day before the International Holocaust Remembrance Day, the Swedish embassy in Prague took the opportunity to honor the memory of Josef and Anna Růžička, the building's first owners. At the same time, they drew attention to the fact that in 2015, it was 70 years since the embassy was established in the house. A so-called Stolperstein, a memorial to someone who fell victim to the Holocaust, was placed in the street outside the embassy. Ambassador Annika Jagander gave a speech. The ceremony was attended by the Speaker of the Riksdag, Urban Ahlin, representatives of the Růžička family and other specially invited guests.

== Staff and tasks ==
=== Staff ===
In 2018, the embassy was staffed by an ambassador, an embassy counsellor responsible for political and economic matters including the EU, second embassy secretary responsible for consular and administrative matters, a defence attaché, a trade commissioner working for Business Sweden and the Swedish Trade and Invest Council as well as locally employed assistants of various kinds and a communication and culture administrator/translator.

=== Tasks ===
The embassy's staff work with various issues in several areas – politics, economy, press and information, culture, administration and consular affairs as well as defence issues. Important tasks for the embassy are to offer service to Swedish citizens who live or are in the Czech Republic. The embassy also provides information on rules for visas, residence permits in Sweden and more.

== Building ==
The house where the Swedish embassy is housed, which is popularly called Na szállé vyhlídce – the beautiful view, was built in 1927 for the wealthy Czech Růžička family. It has four floors and several terraces. The house is next to the Strahov Monastery and near the Prague Castle. The hill below slopes steeply towards the river Vltava. The view consists of a vast park and the famous Charles Bridge looming over the river.

The building was designed by the architect Tomáš Šašek, who managed to make it fit in stylistically with the surrounding baroque architecture. One of the obstacles to the construction was that the popular tavern Na szállé vyhlídce ("At the beautiful view") had to be demolished to make room. From the beginning, the house was intended as a single-family house, but in the end a large building with room for four families was created. Šašek was obviously given a free hand and the building became very lavish. Architect Šašek designed an angular house body, facing the street, divided into three parts that follow the slope of Úvoz street with gradually decreasing heights. Inside, behind the screening wall, the various parts of the house body are emphasized by terraces and an arcade. The leveled division of the garden follows the steeply sloping plot and becomes like an organic extension of the building. The only decor Tomáš Šašek used was simply profiled moldings and the play between surfaces, between light and shadow over the facades of the house. There's a view of Prague from the garden side of the embassy.

The automobile racer Eliška Junková lived in the house from 1930. When Junková moved in, she thought the whole house was upside down and to get a better view, she paid for a balcony to the attic apartment she rented. From there she could see to the south and the Strahov Monastery. A small bronze plaque on the wall facing Úvoz street states that she lived in the house until her death in 1994. In recent years, the National Property Board of Sweden (SFV) has carried out a complete renovation of the property. Today it houses the chancery, ambassador residence and three staff residences. In 2013, SFV did foundation strengthening of the lower part of the property and renovation work on the embassy's facades.

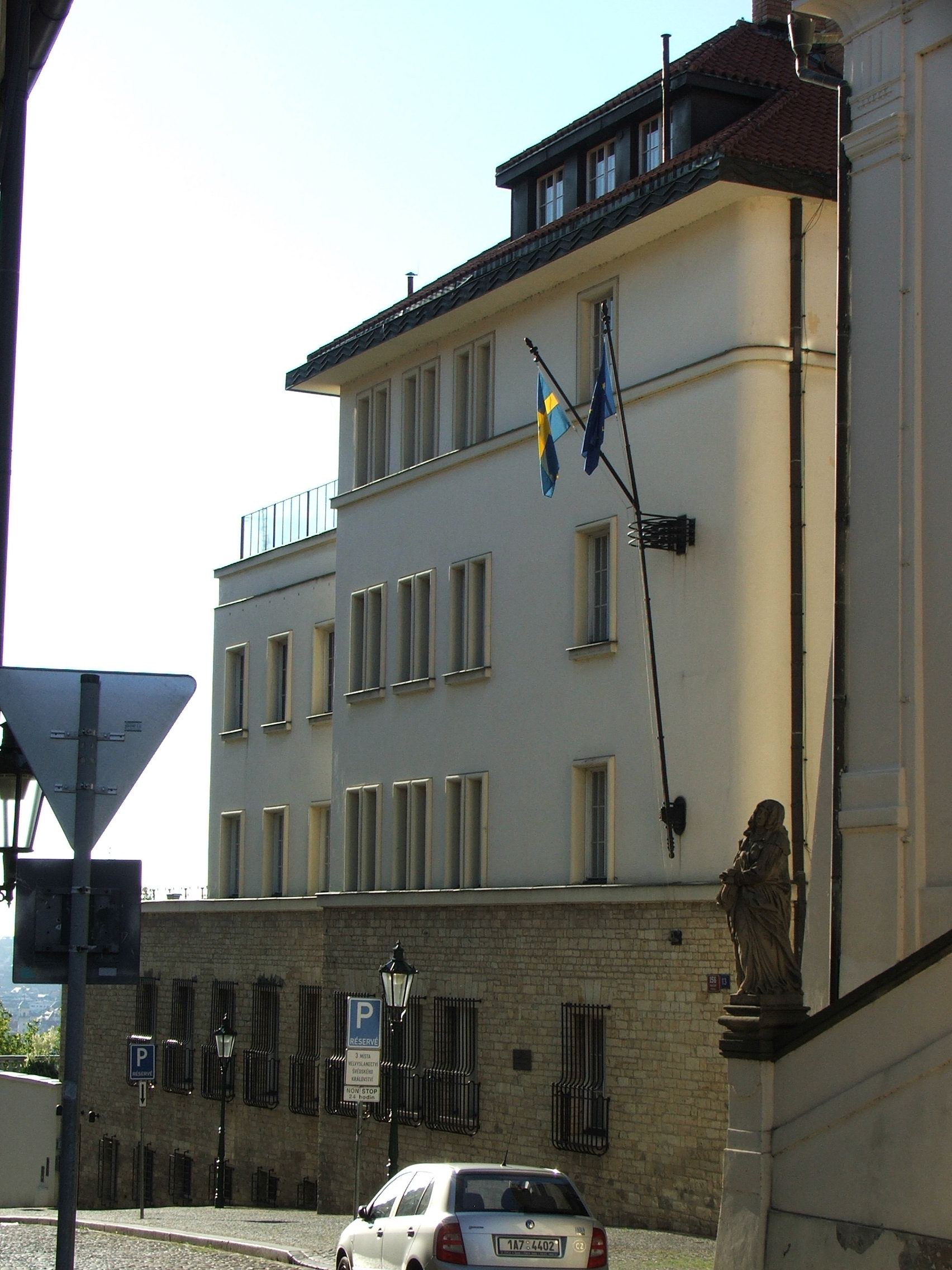
Embassy in 2007

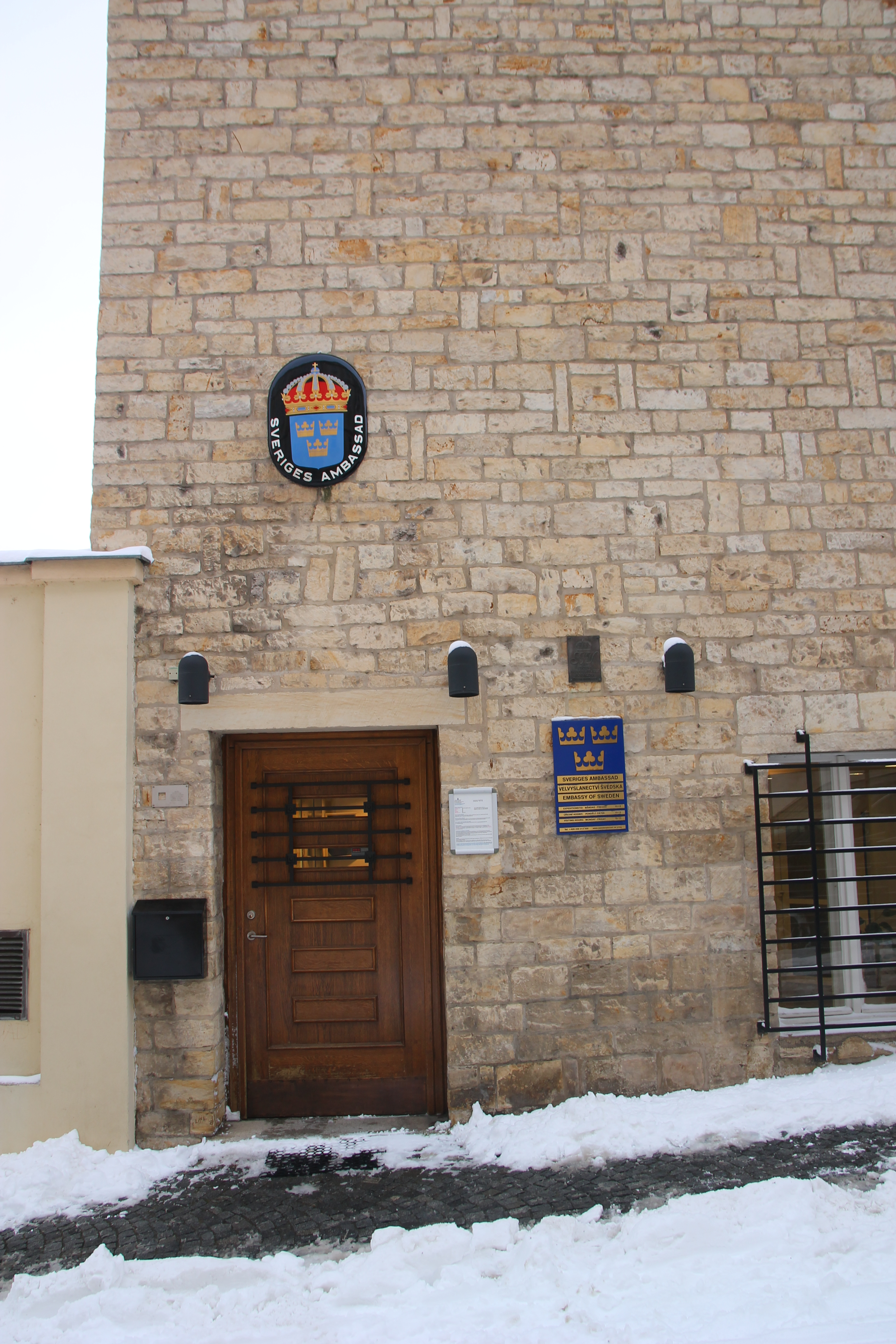
Entrance

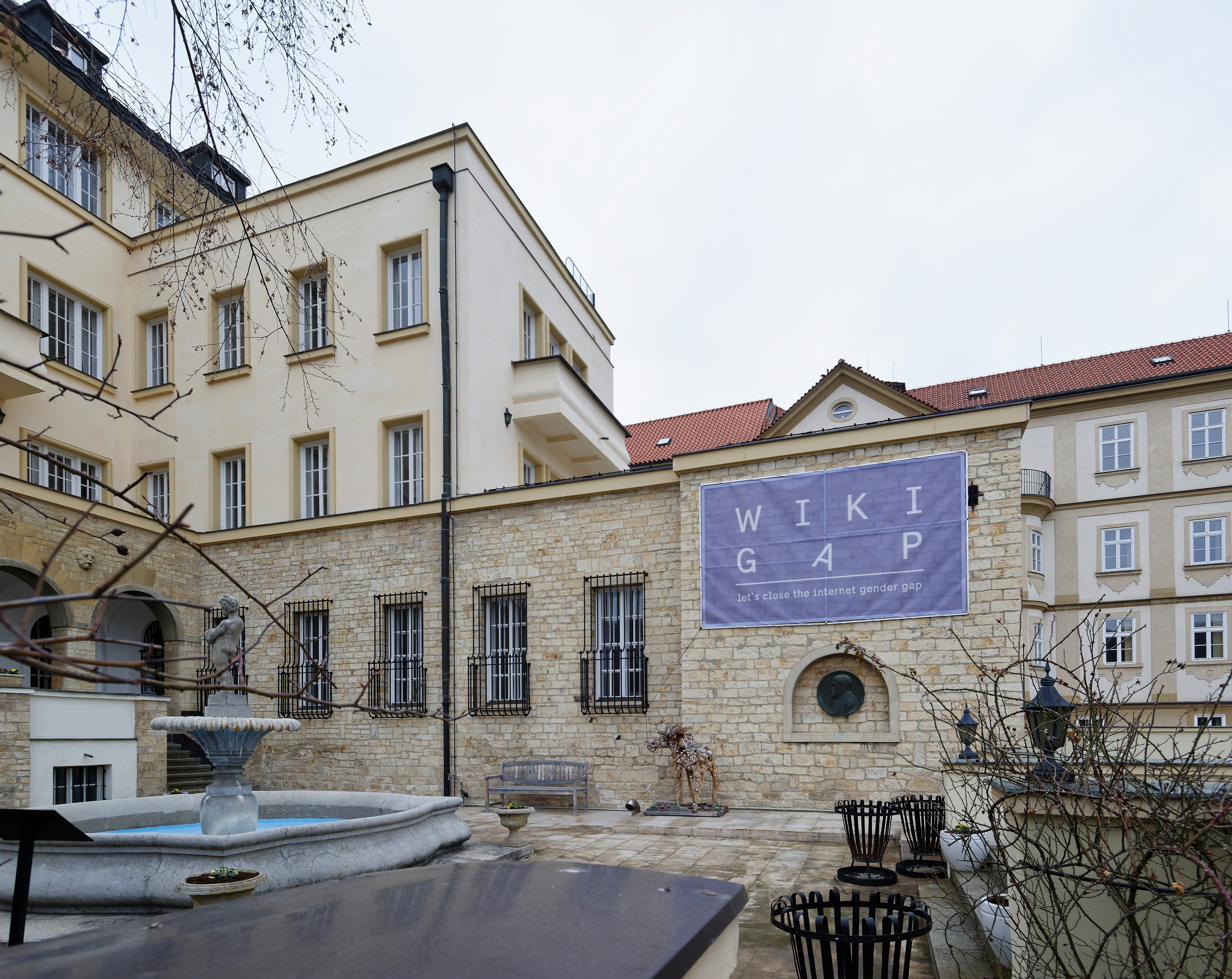
Exterior

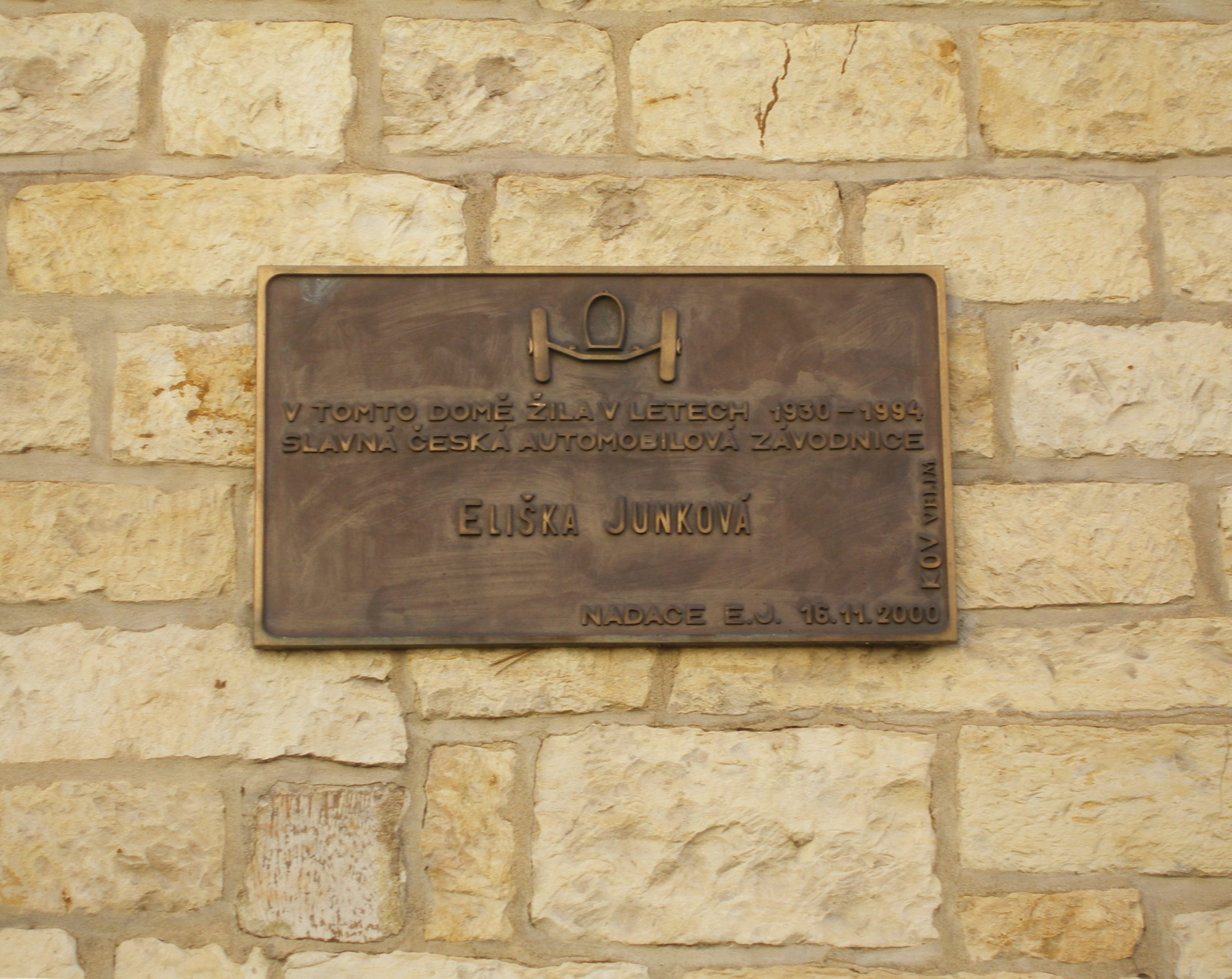
Eliška Junková plaque
