= List of ambassadors of Sweden to the Czech Republic =

Ambassador of Sweden to the Czech Republic
- Lesser coat of arms of the Kingdom of Sweden

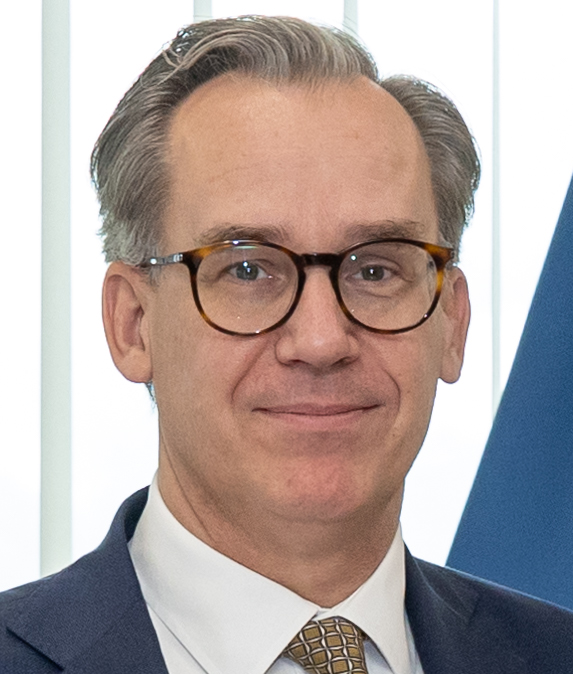
- Incumbent; Håkan Jevrell since 2025
- Ministry for Foreign Affairs; Swedish Embassy, Prague
- Style: His or Her Excellency (formal); Mr. or Madam Ambassador (informal)
- Reports to: Minister for Foreign Affairs
- Residence: Úvoz 13, Hradčany (Note: The ambassador's residence is at the same location as the chancery.)
- Seat: Prague, Czech Republic
- Appointer: Government of Sweden
- Term length: No fixed term
- Precursor: Ambassador of Sweden to Czechoslovakia
- Formation: 1992
- First holder: Lennart Watz
- Website: Swedish Embassy, Prague

The Ambassador of Sweden to the Czech Republic (known formally as the Ambassador of the Kingdom of Sweden to the Czech Republic) is the official representative of the government of Sweden to the president of the Czech Republic and government of the Czech Republic.

== History ==
On 1 January 1993, Sweden recognized the two new states of the Czech Republic and Slovakia. Diplomatic relations with the governments in Prague and Bratislava had now been established. The Swedish embassy in Prague in the former Czechoslovakia became an embassy in the newly created Czech Republic and the Swedish ambassador to Czechoslovakia became ambassador to the Czech Republic. Lennart Watz was appointed ambassador in Prague with a dual accreditation in Bratislava, the capital of Slovakia.

== List of representatives ==
| Name | Period | Title | Resident / Concurrent accreditation | Notes | Presented credentials | Ref |
|---|---|---|---|---|---|---|
| Lennart Watz | 1992–1996 | Ambassador | Also accredited to Bratislava (from 1993) | | | |
| Ingmar Karlsson | 1996–2001 | Ambassador | Also accredited to Bratislava | | | |
| Harald Fälth | 2001–2006 | Ambassador | Also accredited to Bratislava (until 2003) | | | |
| Catherine von Heidenstam | 2006–2010 | Ambassador | | | | |
| Inger Ultvedt | 2010–2011 | Ambassador | | | | |
| Annika Jagander | 2011–2016 | Ambassador | | | | |
| Viktoria Li | September 2016 – 2020 | Ambassador | | | | |
| Fredrik Jörgensen | September 2020 – 2025 | Ambassador | | | | |
| Håkan Jevrell | 2025 – present | Ambassador | | | 8 October 2025 | |

== See also ==
- Embassy of Sweden, Prague
