= Cecilia Julin =

Swedish diplomat (born 1955)

Her Excellency Cecilia Julin GYC
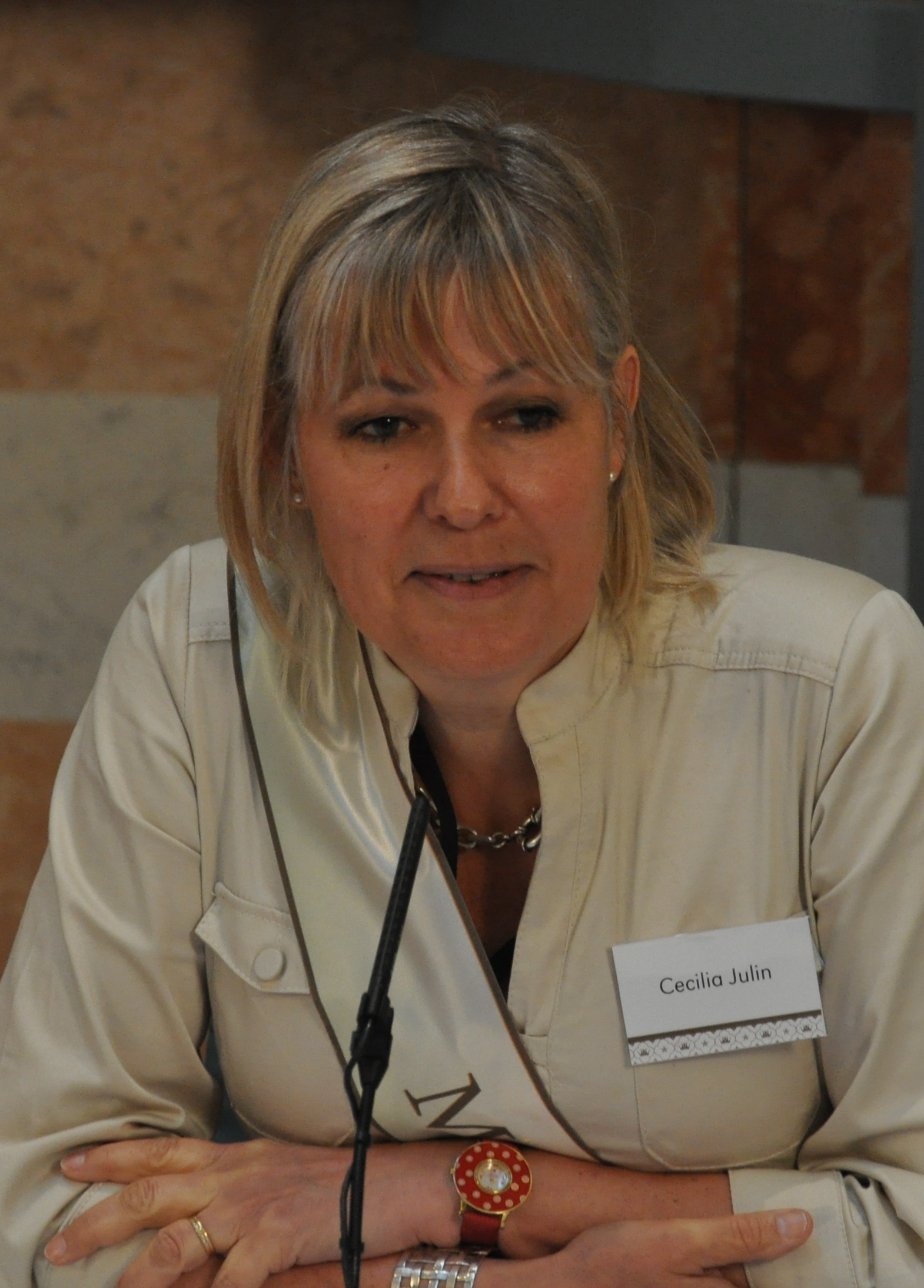
- Julin in 2010

Ambassador of Sweden to South Africa
- In office September 2016 – 2020
- Preceded by: Anders Hagelberg
- Succeeded by: Håkan Juholt

Ambassador of Sweden to Spain
- In office September 2011 – 2016
- Preceded by: Jörgen Persson
- Succeeded by: Lars-Hjalmar Wide

Ambassador of Sweden to Slovakia
- In office 2003–2006
- Preceded by: Harald Fälth
- Succeeded by: Mikael Westerlind

Personal details
- Born: 25 March 1955 (age 71) Stockholm, Sweden
- Education: Stockholm University (MBA)
- Occupation: Diplomat

Cecilia Julin (born 25 March 1955) is a Swedish diplomat became the ambassador to South Africa from 2016 to 2020, Spain from 2011 to 2016, and Slovakia from 2003 to 2006.

== Education ==
Julin pursued a master's degree in economics at Stockholm University.

== Diplomatic career ==
Julin began her diplomatic career in 1984 and has held postings in Slovakia, Peru, Israel, and the United States. She has also held positions in the trade policy and regional divisions for the Americas. From 2006 to 2011, she served as the Minister of Trade and European Union's chief of cabinet; head of the department of Press and Communications on 20 February 2009; and spokeswoman for the Ministry of Foreign Affairs.

=== Spain ===
Julin was appointed in September 2011, as Sweden's ambassador to Spain and non-resident ambassador to Andorra. In January 2012, she would arrive in Madrid. In Madrid on 10 January, King Juan Carlos I welcomed her, to the Royal Palace. "My husband Anders and I are going to miss Spain, a wonderful country, very much, and, in particular, Madrid, an unknown jewel that I always recommend Swedish people to visit," declared the Swedish Ambassador, who would continue to represent her nation in South Africa. She has largely succeeded in achieving this, as seen by the 29% rise in Swedish visitors to Madrid in 2015.

=== South Africa ===
Julin has been named ambassador to Pretoria by the Swedish government on 2 June 2016. Later in September, she would begin her new job. She paid ACCORD House a visit on 6 June 2017. She arrived in South Africa in 2016 to assume the role of new Swedish ambassador. Billy Modise received the Order of the Polar Star on 16 November 2017, from Julin. This honour was awarded by King Carl XVI Gustaf of Sweden. On 2 December 2019, the Goal Tracker portal for South Africa has been opened by Julin, and Risenga Maluleke. With the help of the Goal Tracker project, citizens and decision-makers can monitor the SDGs' progress and pinpoint areas that need immediate attention.

== Honours ==
- Knight Grand Cross of the Order of Isabella the Catholic (GYC; 13 January 2017)

Diplomatic posts
Preceded by Harald Fälth	Ambassador of Sweden to Slovakia; 2003–2006	Succeeded by Mikael Westerlind
Preceded by Anders Rönquist	Ambassador of Sweden to Spain; 2011–2016	Succeeded by Lars-Hjalmar Wide
Preceded by Anders Rönquist	Ambassador of Sweden to Andorra; 2011–2016	Succeeded by Lars-Hjalmar Wide
Preceded by Anders Hagelberg	Ambassador of Sweden to South Africa; 2016–2020	Succeeded by Håkan Juholt
Preceded by Anders Hagelberg	Ambassador of Sweden to Botswana; 2016–2020	Succeeded by Håkan Juholt
Preceded by Anders Hagelberg	Ambassador of Sweden to Lesotho; 2016–2020	Succeeded by Håkan Juholt
Preceded by Anders Hagelberg	Ambassador of Sweden to Namibia; 2016–2020	Succeeded by Håkan Juholt
