= Annika Jagander =

Swedish diplomat

Her Excellency Annika Jagander
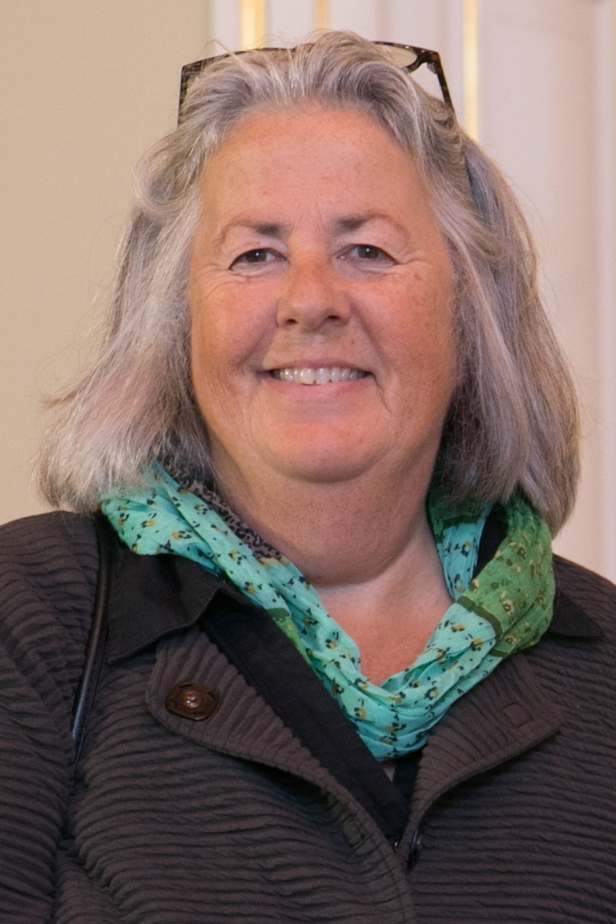
- Jagander in 2017

Ambassador of Sweden to Latvia
- In office 2017–2020
- Preceded by: Henrik Landerholm
- Succeeded by: Karin Höglund

Ambassador of Sweden to the Czech Republic
- In office 2011–2016
- Preceded by: Inger Ultvedt
- Succeeded by: Viktoria Li

Ambassador of Sweden to Botswana
- In office 2004–2007
- Preceded by: Birgitta Karlström Dorph
- Succeeded by: Peter Tejler

Personal details
- Born: 5 March 1957 (age 69) Sweden
- Occupation: Diplomat, political scientists

Annika Jagander (born 5 March 1957) is a Swedish diplomat and political scientist became the ambassador to Latvia from 2017 to 2020, the Czech Republic from 2011 to 2016, and Botswana from 2004 to 2007.

== Diplomatic career ==
=== Botswana ===
The Minister of Foreign Affairs and International Cooperation, Mompati Merafhe, has attributed the better bilateral ties between Sweden and Botswana to the departure of Jagander. Speaking at her goodbye party, Merafhe stated that her individual initiatives and diligent work throughout her term of office had made a substantial contribution to the development of bilateral relations between the two nations. According to her, Botswana has demonstrated to other nations that the quality of a nation's people was what ultimately matters for that nation's prosperity. After spending three and a half years in Botswana, the envoy spoke.

=== Czech Republic ===
The office of the Government of the Czech Republic was notified by Jagander, about the itinerary for the Royal Swedish Academy of Engineering Sciences, which was scheduled to take place in the Czech Republic from 8 to 11 May 2012. About 30 people would be involved in the mission, which will be led by IVA Chairman Leif Johansson and graced by Charles XVI Gustav, whose attendance has already been confirmed. On 27 November 2014, Jagander went to meet Robin Böhnisch, at his invitation. Jan Korbelář, the director, welcomed them when they visited the Czech Forestry Academy, with her planting a tree in the school forest.

=== Latvia ===
Annika Jagander has been named ambassador by the Swedish government to the Latvian capital. She worked in the foreign administration before. She has also worked as a rapporteur in the foreign affairs committee of the Riksdag, as well as at the UN representative in New York, the embassies in Washington, Madrid, and Havana. She begins work in her new role on 1 September 2017.

In order to encourage the spread of information and knowledge as well as opportunities for people-to-people cooperation between Latvia and Sweden, the Latvian-Swedish Cooperation Fund was established in 2019. This bilateral instrument was created to support the implementation of cooperation and exchange programs.

During the Stockholm School of Economics in Riga's 25th anniversary celebration, Jagander recalled some of the debate that took place back in June 1993, when the Riksdag voted to support the government's bill to build a pan-Baltic business school in Riga. She said, "Undoubtedly, one of Sweden's best development assistance projects and investments ever."

Jagander met with Political Director Jānis Mažeiks, the Under Secretary of State of the Ministry of Foreign Affairs, on 29 June 2020. The parties commended Latvia and Sweden for their close and broad cooperation. During the Ambassador's term, a number of high-profile visits have occurred, including as the visit to Riga by Crown Princess Victoria and Prince Daniel in commemoration of Latvia's centenary.

Diplomatic posts
Preceded by Henrik Landerholm	Ambassador of Sweden to Latvia; 2017–2020	Succeeded by Karin Höglund
Preceded by Inger Ultvedt	Ambassador of Sweden to the Czech Republic; 2011–2016	Succeeded by Viktoria Li
Preceded by Birgitta Karlström Dorph	Ambassador of Sweden to Botswana; 2004–2007	Succeeded by Peter Tejler
