= Billy Modise =

Personal details
- Born: 18 December 1930; Bloemfontein, Orange Free State, Union of South Africa
- Died: 20 June 2018 (aged 87); Johannesburg, Gauteng, South Africa
- Political party: ANC
- Spouse: Yolisa Modise
- Occupation: Secretary-General of the African National Congress

Billy Modise (18 December 1930 - 20 June 2018) was a South African activist and diplomat. He was an African National Congress (ANC) veteran and ambassador.

== Early life ==
Billy Modise was born on 8 December 1930 in Bloemfontein, Orange Free State (now Free State Province).

== Education ==
He received an Anglican scholarship which enabled him to enrol for secondary school in Modeerport. After completing his schooling, between 1950 and 1955, Modise worked at a wholesale store and later for a medical doctor as a clerk to raise money to enable him to further his studies at university. In January 1955, he enrolled at the University of Fort Hare to study medicine. As a student at Fort Hare, he came into contact with politicians such as Professor ZK Matthews and Govan Mbeki who inspired him to become politically active. He was elected Secretary of the ANC Youth League for the Fort Hare branch, and later served as secretary of the Student Representative Council. He also became a member of the National Union of South African Students (NUSAS) serving as an executive member. In 1959 he switched from studying medicine to a BA degree.

== Exile and return ==
While at Fort Hare University, the apartheid government introduced the University Extension Bill, which legalised tertiary segregation, forcing students of different races to go to separate universities. He was at the forefront of fighting against the bill but did not succeed. In January 1960, he was asked by NUSAS to attend a conference in Switzerland. Fearing arrest, he initially declined, although after advice from his family and the ANC he then accepted. It was around that time that the Lund University Students Union in Sweden offered him a scholarship to go abroad and study medicine. While studying in Sweden, he started mobilizing college student formations against Apartheid and networking on behalf of the ANC. He was a founding member of the South African Committee in Lund alongside Lars-Erik Johansson and Ulf Agrell. The Committee convened meetings, printed publications, leaflets and campaigned parliamentarians to help the battle against Apartheid.

Between 1960 and 1972, Modise travelled across Europe in an attempt to mobilize people in Finland, Denmark and Norway to boycott all South African products.

In 1966, the ANC Youth and Student Section (ANC YSS) was formed, with former President Thabo Mbeki as leader in the United Kingdom. ANC YSS later played critical roles in the country's transition to a democracy. The leadership of the ANC YSS included Billy Modise, Joe Nhlanhla who later became Mbeki’s first minister of intelligence and was the chair of the ASA (The African Students Association) in Moscow and Union of Soviet Socialist Republics (USSR), Jackie Selebi along with many others. The ANC YSS had two main objectives: looking after the welfare of the ANC youth and mobilising youth against apartheid internationally

In 1975, he was redeployed to the United States to work in New York for the United Nations Human Settlements Programme (UN-Habitat)‚ where he was preparing policy papers on resettlements. From 1976 to 1988‚ he also worked for the UN‚ training exiled Namibians in political science‚ sociology and education‚ among other courses.

In 1988, he left the UN to work for the ANC full-time. He was sent back to Sweden as chief representative of the ANC. Modise returned to South Africa in 1990 and was deployed at the ANC head office in Johannesburg. In 1991 he was tasked with heading the Matla Trust‚ which had been established to prepare for the 1994 elections at the then Shell House ANC headquarters. After the first democratic elections, he was posted abroad as South Africa's High Commissioner to Canada in 1995, to become democratic South Africa's first black High Commissioner. He also served as the Chief of State Protocol under President Thabo Mbeki from 1999 to 2006. Modise served on a number of boards, including those of South African Airways and Kgodiso Investments.

== Marriage and family ==
Billy Modise married Yolisa Bokwe in 1964. They then went on to have three children, Bontle, Tshepo and Thandi.

== Accolades ==
Modise was a recipient of the annual Ubuntu Awards, which recognise South African industry leaders and distinguished persons for their distinguished service and contribution to promoting South Africa's national interests and values across the world.

In 2008, Ambassador Modise received the Order of Luthuli – Silver Class from former President Thabo Mbeki for excellent contribution in the achievement of a South Africa free of racial oppression and contributing to the building of a non-racial, non-sexist and democratic South Africa.

He also received the Premier's Excellence Award from the Premier of the Free State for his contribution towards the liberation struggle and South Africa in general.

On 16 November 2017, the Swedish Ambassador to South Africa, Cecilia Julin, at the decision of King Carl XVI Gustaf of Sweden, bestowed the Order of the Polar Star on ACCORD Trustee ambassador Billy Modise.

Ambassador Modise was a member of ACCORD’s Board of Trustees from 2007 until his death in June 2018.
