= List of ambassadors of Sweden to Afghanistan =

Ambassador of Sweden to Afghanistan
- Lesser coat of arms of the Kingdom of Sweden
- Ministry for Foreign Affairs; Swedish Embassy, Kabul
- Style: His or Her Excellency (formal); Mr. or Madam Ambassador (informal)
- Reports to: Minister for Foreign Affairs
- Appointer: Government of Sweden
- Term length: No fixed term
- Inaugural holder: Rolf Sohlman
- Formation: 30 June 1948
- Abolished: August 2024

The Ambassador of Sweden to Afghanistan (known formally as the Ambassador of the Kingdom of Sweden to the Islamic Emirate of Afghanistan) was the official representative of the government of Sweden to the president of Afghanistan and government of Afghanistan.

== History ==
Sweden and Afghanistan established diplomatic relations on 22 November 1940. On 30 June 1948, Rolf Sohlman was appointed as Sweden's first minister accredited to Afghanistan. On 6 June 1949, Sohlman, who was Sweden's ambassador to Moscow and also served as Sweden's minister to Afghanistan, presented his credentials to King Mohammad Zahir Shah.

In August 1960, the Swedish and Afghan governments reached an agreement that the heads of their respective missions would hold the rank of ambassador. From the same year, Sweden's ambassador in Tehran was accredited to Kabul. This accreditation ended with the Soviet–Afghan War in 1979. Thereafter, diplomatic contact remained dormant until Afghanistan was covered through dual accreditation from Islamabad in 2002.

In 2008, Sweden established a diplomatic presence in the country by opening an embassy in Kabul. After the Taliban takeover in August 2021, embassy staff operated from Stockholm. As of 31 August 2024, Sweden's embassy in Kabul has been closed.

== List of representatives ==
| Name | Period | Resident / Non-resident | Title | Resident / Concurrent accreditation | Notes | Presented credentials | Ref |
Kingdom of Afghanistan (1926–1973)
| Rolf Sohlman | 30 June 1948 – 1960 | Non-resident | Envoy | Resident in Moscow | Appointed 30 June 1948, took office 24 May 1949. | 6 June 1949 | |
| Dick Hichens-Bergström | 1960–1963 | Non-resident | Ambassador | Resident in Tehran | | | |
| Eyvind Bratt | 1964–1967 | Non-resident | Ambassador | Resident in Tehran | | | |
| Nils-Eric Ekblad | 1967–1970 | Non-resident | Ambassador | Resident in Tehran | | | |
| Gustaf Bonde | 1970–1973 | Non-resident | Ambassador | Resident in Tehran | | | |
Republic of Afghanistan (1973–1978)
| Bengt Odhner | 1973–1978 | Non-resident | Ambassador | Resident in Tehran | | | |
| Kaj Sundberg | 1978–1979 (Note: Unclear whether Kaj Sundberg's diplomatic accreditation in Kabul was terminated at the outbreak of the Soviet–Afghan War on 25 December 1979.) | Non-resident | Ambassador | Resident in Tehran | | | |
| – | 1979–2002 | – | | | No ambassador between 1979 and 2002. | | |
Transitional Islamic State of Afghanistan (2002–2004)
| Peter Tejler | 2002–2003 | Non-resident | Ambassador | Resident in Islamabad | | | |
| Ann Wilkens | 2003–2004 | Non-resident | Ambassador | Resident in Islamabad | | | |
Islamic Republic of Afghanistan (2004–2021)
| Ann Wilkens | 2004–2007 | Non-resident | Ambassador | Resident in Islamabad | | | |
| Anna Karin Eneström | 2007–2008 | Non-resident | Ambassador | Resident in Islamabad | | | |
| Svante Kilander | 8 May 2008 – 2010 | Resident | Ambassador | | Appointed 8 May 2008, took office 10 June 2008 | 21 September 2008 | |
| Torbjörn Pettersson | 2010–2012 | Resident | Ambassador | | | | |
| Peter Semneby | 2012–2015 | Resident | Ambassador | | | | |
| Anders Sjöberg | 2015–2017 | Resident | Ambassador | | | | |
| Tobias Thyberg | 1 September 2017 – 2019 | Resident | Ambassador | | | | |
| Caroline Vicini | 1 September 2019 – 2020 | Resident | Ambassador | | | | |
| Torkel Stiernlöf | September 2020 – 2021 | Resident | Ambassador | | | | |
Islamic Emirate of Afghanistan (2021–present)
| Torkel Stiernlöf | 2021–2022 | Resident | Ambassador | | | | |
| Jörgen Lindström | September 2022 – 2023 | Non-resident | Special envoy | Resident in Stockholm | | | |
| Johan Ndisi | August 2023 – 2024 | Non-resident | Special envoy | Resident in Stockholm | | | |
