= Arne Helleryd =

Swedish diplomat (1920–2009)

- Born: Bror Arne Lennart Helleryd; 29 January 1920; Örebro, Sweden
- Died: 1 November 2009 (aged 89); Allerum, Sweden
- Education: Gothenburg School of Business, Economics and Law
- Occupation: Diplomat
- Years active: 1946–1985
- Spouse: Ida Vizenzinovich (m. 1947; died 1996)
- Children: 1

Bror Arne Lennart Helleryd (29 January 1920 – 1 November 2009) was a Swedish diplomat whose career in the Ministry for Foreign Affairs began in 1946. Early on, he was posted to Shanghai, where during the Chinese Civil War (1949–1951) he served as Sweden's only representative in China.

He subsequently held diplomatic positions in Copenhagen, Rio de Janeiro, Mexico City, and New York City. From 1976 to 1978, he served as ambassador to several Central American countries, where he became involved in high-profile consular matters, including a kidnapping case in El Salvador. He was then appointed ambassador to Addis Ababa (1978–1982), with concurrent accreditation to several neighboring countries, and later served as envoy in Pretoria (1982–1985).

== Early life ==
Helleryd was born on 29 January 1920 in Örebro, Sweden, the son of managing director Edvin Helleryd and Elsa (née Gustafson). He had two brothers and one sister.

He passed his upper secondary school examination in 1940 and obtained a Master of Science in Business and Economics degree from the Gothenburg School of Business, Economics and Law in 1945. He was a member of the Swedish Association of Economists (Svenska civilekonomföreningen).

== Career ==
Helleryd's first appointment was with the National Swedish Price Control Board (Statens priskontrollnämnd) in 1946. That same year, he became a secretary at the Ministry for Foreign Affairs, tasked with investigating financial irregularities at Sweden's Consulate General in Shanghai. Because of the Chinese Civil War, Helleryd was, between 1949 and 1951, the ministry's only posted official in China, representing Sweden—including during hours-long victory parades for Mao Zedong.

He was appointed attaché at the ministry in 1951, posted to the embassy in Copenhagen in 1952, and became embassy secretary in Rio de Janeiro in 1955. He returned to the ministry as first secretary in 1959 and was promoted to senior administrative officer (byrådirektör) in 1963. In 1964 he was appointed counsellor at the embassy in Mexico City, and in 1969 he became consul in New York City. From 1976 to 1978, he served as ambassador to Guatemala City, San Salvador, Tegucigalpa, Managua, and San José. During his time in Latin America, he was involved in the case of the kidnapped Swedish LM Ericsson executive Kjell Björk in San Salvador in August 1978.

He then served as ambassador in Addis Ababa from 1978 to 1982, with concurrent accreditation to Aden (1978–1981), Antananarivo (1978–1981), and Port Louis (1978–1981). In August 1979, Helleryd was also accredited to Djibouti City, where Sweden had not previously had an ambassador.

In Ethiopia, he was involved in the case of the adult education teacher Göran Göransson, who was arrested at Addis Ababa Bole International Airport in April 1981 for unclear reasons. Helleryd participated in security interrogations of Göransson and contacted various ministries in Addis Ababa in efforts to secure his release. The following year, in March 1982, Helleryd was involved in the case of aid expert Sture Bäcklund, who had been imprisoned in Addis Ababa. Despite his diplomatic immunity, Bäcklund was accused of "associating with separatist bandits," referring to the resistance movement in Eritrea Province.

He subsequently served as envoy in Pretoria from 1982 to 1985.

== Personal life ==
In 1947, Helleryd married Ida Amy Maud Vizenzinovich (31 August 1909 in Shanghai, China – 6 November 1996 in Somerset West, South Africa). They had one daughter, Cristina (born 1956).

After retiring in September 1985, Helleryd remained in South Africa and settled in Franschhoek. His decision to stay was criticized by the Ministry for Foreign Affairs' State Secretary for Foreign Affairs, Pierre Schori. The move drew significant attention and resulted in a full-page article in the South African newspaper Sunday Times on 27 January 1986, which described Helleryd as "the strangest of all defectors" and noted that his residence in South Africa was considered a scandal in Sweden.

He then lived in Southern France from 2000 to 2002 before returning to Sweden, where he settled in Hittarp in Helsingborg Municipality.

== Death ==
Hellryd died on 1 November 2009 in Allerum. He was interred on 29 January 2010 in his parents grave Northern Cemetery in his hometown of Örebro.

== Awards and decorations ==
- (Sweden) For Zealous and Devoted Service of the Realm (August 1976)
- (Sweden) Knight of the Order of the Polar Star (1 December 1973)
- (Denmark) Knight of the Order of the Dannebrog
- Knight of the Order of the Lion of Finland

Diplomatic posts
Preceded by Claës König	Ambassador of Sweden to Guatemala; 1976–1978	Succeeded by Henrik Ramel
Preceded by Claës König	Ambassador of Sweden to Costa Rica; 1976–1978	Succeeded by Henrik Ramel
Preceded by Claës König	Ambassador of Sweden to El Salvador; 1976–1978	Succeeded by Henrik Ramel
Preceded by Claës König	Ambassador of Sweden to Honduras; 1976–1978	Succeeded by Henrik Ramel
Preceded by Claës König	Ambassador of Sweden to Nicaragua; 1976–1978	Succeeded by Henrik Ramel
Preceded by Bengt Friedman	Ambassador of Sweden to Ethiopia; 1978–1982	Succeeded by Nils Revelius
Preceded by Bengt Friedman	Ambassador of Sweden to South Yemen; 1978–1981	Succeeded by Arne Fältheim
Preceded by Bengt Friedman	Ambassador of Sweden to Madagascar; 1978–1981	Succeeded by Arne Fältheim
Preceded by Bengt Friedman	Ambassador of Sweden to Mauritius; 1978–1981	Succeeded by Arne Fältheim
Preceded by None	Ambassador of Sweden to Djibouti; 1979–1982	Succeeded by Nils Revelius
Preceded by Gustaf Hamilton af Hageby	Envoy of Sweden to South Africa; 1982–1985	Succeeded by Jan Lundvik
