= Anna Karin Eneström =

Swedish diplomat

Ambassador of Sweden to South Africa
- Incumbent
- Assumed office 2025
- Preceded by: Håkan Juholt

Permanent Representative of Sweden to the United Nations
- In office 6 January 2020 – 30 September 2024
- Preceded by: Olof Skoog
- Succeeded by: Nicola Clase

Ambassador of Sweden to Pakistan
- In office 2007–2009
- Preceded by: Ann Wilkens
- Succeeded by: Ulrika Sundberg

Ambassador of Sweden to Afghanistan
- In office 2007–2008
- Preceded by: Ann Wilkens
- Succeeded by: Svante Kilander

Personal details
- Born: 17 November 1961 (age 64)
- Spouse: Per Enarsson
- Children: 2
- Education: Uppsala University
- Occupation: Diplomat

Rakel Anna Karin Eneström (born 17 November 1961) is a Swedish diplomat who has been serving as the Swedish Permanent Representative to the United Nations, having presented her credentials on 6 January 2020. She had been Deputy Permanent Representative since 2019 a 2022.

== Early life and education ==
Eneström earned a Master of Laws degree from the University of Uppsala.

== Career ==
Previously in her career, Eneström served as Representative to the Political and Security Committee at the Permanent Representation of Sweden to the European Union in Brussels.

Eneström was Special Envoy to Afghanistan and Pakistan in 2009 after having served as Ambassador to those countries in 2007.

== Other activities ==
- International Gender Champions (IGC), Member
- International Peace Institute (IPI), Member of the International Advisory Council

== See also ==
- Sweden and the United Nations

Diplomatic posts
Preceded by Ann Wilkens	Ambassador of Sweden to Pakistan; 2007–2009	Succeeded by Ulrika Sundberg
Preceded by Ann Wilkens	Ambassador of Sweden to Afghanistan; 2007–2008	Succeeded by Svante Kilander
Preceded by Olof Skoog	Permanent Representative of Sweden to the United Nations; 2019–2024	Succeeded by Nicola Clase
Preceded by Håkan Juholt	Ambassador of Sweden to South Africa; 2025–present	Succeeded by Incumbent
Preceded by Håkan Juholt	Ambassador of Sweden to Botswana; 2025–present	Succeeded by Incumbent
Preceded by Håkan Juholt	Ambassador of Sweden to Lesotho; 2025–present	Succeeded by Incumbent
Preceded by Håkan Juholt	Ambassador of Sweden to Namibia; 2025–present	Succeeded by Incumbent
