= South Africa–Sweden relations =

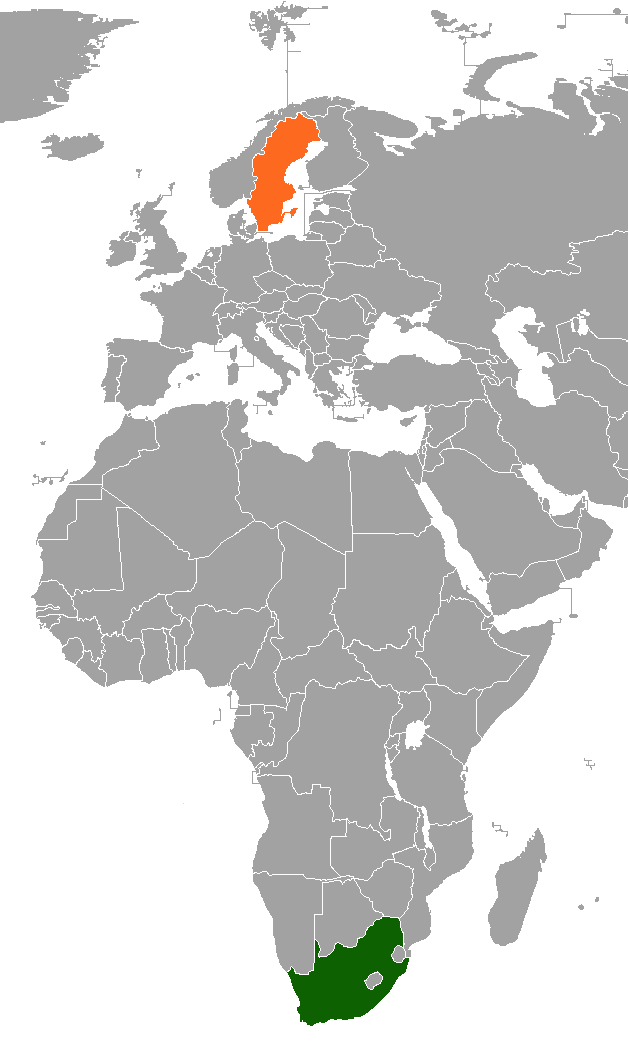
- South Africa: Sweden

South Africa–Sweden relations refers to the bilateral relations between Sweden and South Africa. Formal relations between the two countries began with the opening of a South African legation in the 1930s with relations being upgraded to ambassadorial level in 1994 following South Africa's first non-racial democratic elections. In 2000 a South African - Swedish Binational Commission was established by President Thabo Mbeki and Prime Minister Göran Persson.

During apartheid Sweden lent significant support for the anti-apartheid movement within South Africa. This support included official assistance from the Swedish government, which made Sweden the only Western country to give official support to the anti-apartheid movement in South Africa during the early 1970s. Notably, this official support grew from protests, boycotts, and social movements within the Swedish public. Other leading nations, such as the United States, still considered the ANC a terrorist organization by the time that Sweden had supported them for decades.

In the current day, this partnership between the two nations has stayed strong, as shown by governmental and societal cooperation. Sweden has an embassy in Pretoria and South Africa has an embassy in Stockholm.

== Broader Context of Anti-Apartheid Solidarity ==
Sweden's fight against apartheid was part of a larger trend of Swedish support for liberation movements in Southern Africa. In 1969, the Swedish Parliament declared official support for African liberation movements in a statement from the Standing Committee on Appropriations. Specifically, official support followed for MPLA in Angola, FRELIMO in Mozambique, SWAPO in South West Africa/Namibia, ZANU and ZAPU in Rhodesia/Zimbabwe, and ANC in South Africa.

In addition to Sweden's support for wider liberation movements across Southern Africa, it is also of note that other Nordic countries, besides just Sweden, also supported for these movements. As of just 1986, the Nordic governments provided over $500 million in assistance to Frontline and surrounding states in Southern Africa. Much of this aid began after the Sharpeville Massacre in 1960, increased after the International Conference of Experts in Support of Victims of Colonialism and Apartheid in Southern Africa in 1973, and increased again after the Soweto massacre in 1976.

South African leaders recognized and applauded these contributions by the Nordic countries. For example, in 1999, South African leader Nelson Mandela thanked Finland for its contribution in an address to the Finnish National Parliament in Helsinki. This trip also included similar stops in Denmark, Norway, Sweden, and the Netherlands.

=== Early Relationship ===
Since the middle of the 17th century, Sweden and South Africa have fostered a relationship of emigration and immigration between the two nations. Many Swedes emigrated to South Africa during these time period, typically ending up locating in the Cape region. This exchange of people also led to an exchange of commercial goods. In 1948, Swedish exports to South Africa made up 2.3% of total Swedish exports. This percentage was the third highest outside of Europe. South Africa also exported many goods to Sweden, though most of it was agricultural exports.

== Anti-Apartheid Support ==
=== Social Organization and Support ===
The Swedish National Union of Students (SFS) began the first organized movement against apartheid after oppressive segregation impacted higher education in South Africa. The SFS raised money by donating blood in order to support black South African students who were victimized by these policies.

Following this, Swedish support for the anti-apartheid movement solidified and spread in the early 1960's. In 1960, the Trade Union Confederation and the Cooperative Union and Wholesale Society began a boycott of South African goods. In 1961, the Swedish South Africa Committee (SSAK) was created and in 1963, the National Council of Swedish Youth also launched a boycott against South African goods. All of these actions spread support for the anti-apartheid movement from a narrow elite to the general public.

As driven by these actions of social organization, Swedish contributions to the International Defence and Aid Fund for Southern Africa (IDAF) increased to a total of about 140,000 SEK. Notably, however, this number increased significantly when Sweden became the first industrialized Western country to give public funds to the IDAF with a gift equivalent to $100,000 US in 1964. Following this, Sweden was by far the largest contributor to the fund.

The Swedish South Africa Committee (SSAK) was one of the most prominent anti-apartheid organizations outside of South Africa, comprising hundreds of different organizations registered in 178 locations in Sweden. The SSAK created a constitution at its founding in Stockholm on March 6, 1961. The objectives outlined include to create a "a strong opinion against apartheid in Sweden," to organize Swedish citizens, to spread accurate information, to help marginalized youth and ethnic groups find education, and to generally support local organization against the apartheid regime in South Africa.

Flag of the African National Congress (ANC)

A relationship formed between the South Africa United Front (SAUF) and the SSAK, fueled especially by the visit of the SAUF co-leaders to Stockholm in 1961. Additionally, the SSAK formed a strong relationship with the African National Congress (ANC). Though the group was widely favored in Sweden, the main impetus behind support came when the ANC President-General, Chief Albert Luthuli, was awarded Nobel Peace Prize in 1961.

=== Official Action ===
Sweden was the first Western country to support legal assistance to political prisoners in South Africa by paying a grant (of $200,000) to the Defence and Aid Fund in 1965. Years later, the Left, Social Democratic, and Liberal parties all submitted parliamentary motions to officially extend support to liberation movements in Southern Africa in 1969. These proposals laid the groundwork for financial support to come.

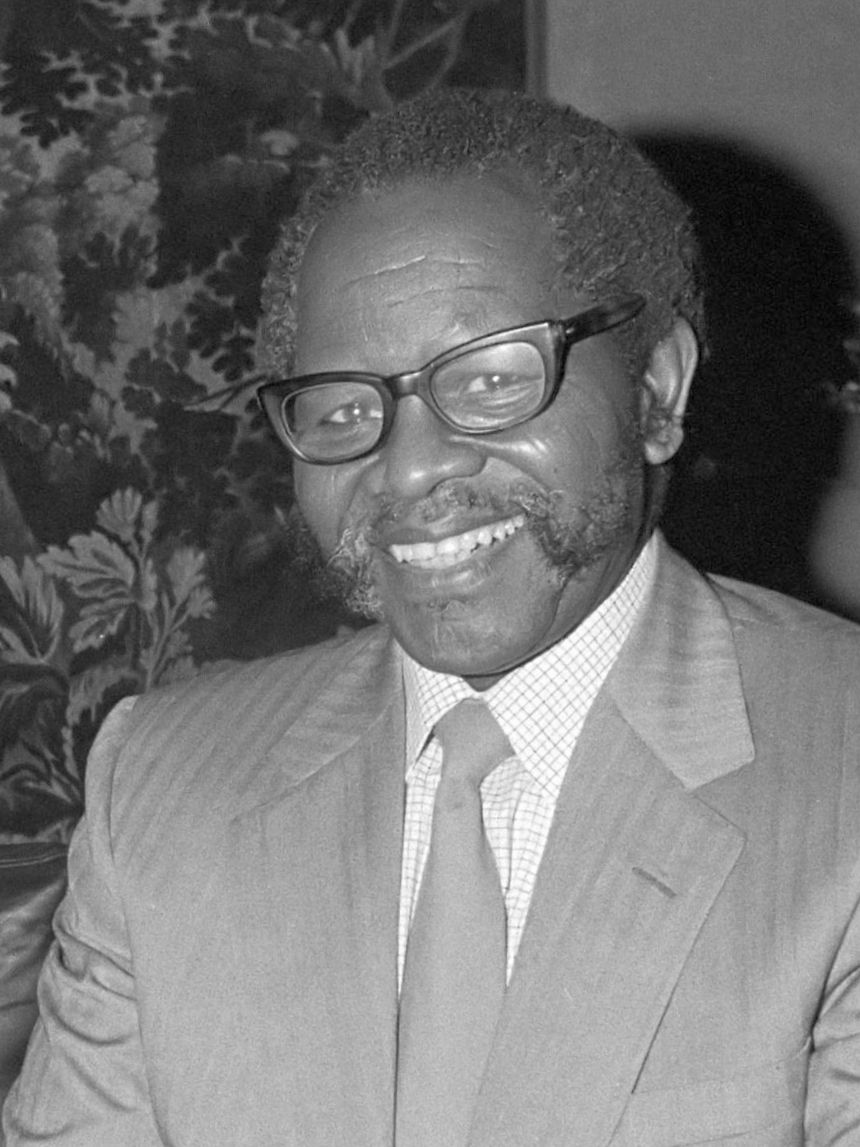
Oliver Tambo (1981) asked for a new level of international action against apartheid in 1973.

In 1968, Oliver Tambo went to the United Nations Special Committee against Apartheid to ask for a new level of international action in the fight against apartheid, in the form of direct assistance. Initially, Sweden denied this request. However, Sweden eventually assented and extended direct humanitarian aid to the ANC in 1973. General Andres Forsse, the director of the Swedish International Development Cooperation Agency, officially signed this request on February 2, 1973. This request granted 150,000 SEK for food. From this amount in 1973, Swedish aid grew to 127 million SEK in 1993/1994. In total, by 1994, direct aid from SIDA to the ANC reached a total of 896 million SEK. This marked Sweden as the first Western country to profess official political support to the anti-apartheid movement. Notable, this aid never came in the form of military aid and, rather, was humanitarian aid.

In addition to direct aid, Sweden also funded NGOs and other international organizations to support the liberation cause. Swedish contributions to the International Defence and Aid Fund for Southern Africa (IDAF) increased to a total of about 140,000 SEK in 1963. Notably, however, this number increased significantly when Sweden became the first industrialized Western country to give public funds to the IDAF with a gift equivalent to $100,000 US in 1964. Following this, Sweden was by far the largest contributor to the fund.

Additionally, Sweden used legislation as a tool against the South African apartheid government. In 1987, the Swedish Parliament passed a total embargo on trade with South Africa, which decreased trade from 1.5 billion SEK in 1984 to 41 million SEK in 1988.

By 1996, Swedish Foreign Minister Lena Hjelm-Wallen reported that Sweden's financial support for the struggle against apartheid reached over $400 million. Notably, the extent of these financial contributions were largely held secret from even the Swedish public because of the safety concerns it could create.

=== Olof Palme ===
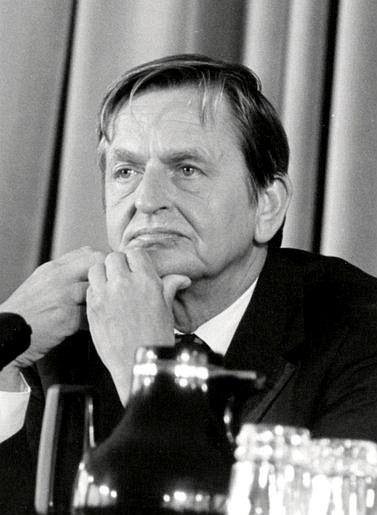
Olof Palme in 1984

Olof Palme was the Swedish prime minister throughout the 1970's and 1980's, and a staunch advocate for South African freedom. He gave a famous speech in 1965 advocating for the alliance with people struggling for national and social liberation. Also mentioning the Vietnam War, the speech marked a decisive breach from the prior official Swedish policy of non-alignment. He declared that "The fundamental moral [values] of democratic socialism [...] make it our obligation to stand on the side of the oppressed against the oppressors, on the side of the poor and the distressed against their exploiters and masters."

In the decades following, Palme became a vocal advocate for the ANC and people oppressed by the apartheid system. In 1986, for example, he spoke with ANC president Oliver Tambo at the Swedish People's Parliament against Apartheid, where described apartheid as a "despicable, doomed system." Unfortunately, Palme was murdered just 7 days later. No official conclusions were reached by the police about the cause of Palme's assassination. However, one theory is that it was in retribution for Palme's support for South Africa's freedom.

=== Complications ===
Leftover from historical relations with White South Africa, some voices resisted the anti-apartheid push in Sweden. Particularly, these voices included Swedish businesses with interests in South Africa, conservative representatives of the Swedish foreign service, and the churches.

As part of their aid, Sweden wanted to increase the financial literacy and accountability of ANC officers. This goal often came into conflict with the grassroots distribution of funds by ANC officers, preventing clear budgeting and money flows that Sweden desired.

In present times, there is also criticism of Sweden's universal support of human rights and the international esteem that Sweden holds as a critic of racism and imperialism without any acknowledgement of race or the impacts of colonialism within its own borders. While internationally, Sweden fought against racial discrimination beginning in the 1960's, it has removed any use of the term "race" from its domestic anti-discrimination law.

== Current Involvement ==
Since South Africa's democratic transition, South Africa and the Kingdom of Sweden have built a fruitful partnership. This includes a bi-national commission and 22 total bilateral agreements. These initiatives span past targeting fundamental needs and, rather, work towards educational and technological growth, such as the South Africa-Sweden University Forum (SASUF) and the Cape Town-Stockholm Connect Initiative.

Trade continues to flow between the two nations. After the Swedish sanctions were removed in 1993, trade began to increase. In 2021, trade between Sweden and South Africa was measured at over $900 million US.

From the time of apartheid, leaders of the two nations have continued to show close connections. In 1990, Sweden was the first country outside of Africa that Nelson Mandela visited after he was released from imprisonment. In 1999, South African Deputy President Jacob Zuma announced the creation of a Swedish-South Africa partnership week in November to celebrate the cooperation and partnership of the two nations since Sweden's help fighting Apartheid. In 2014, Mandela's cellmate of 18 years, Ahmed Kathrada, visited Sweden to celebrate the progress of South Africa and Sweden's aid in that progress. In this speech, Kathrada shared that, "throughout our struggle, one of our greatest friends were the people of Sweden." In 2022, Alvin Botes, the Deputy Minister of International Relations and Cooperation, visited Stockholm at the invitation of the Swedish State Secretary in the Ministry of Foreign Affairs, Krister Nilsson. During this visit, the two leaders discussed climate change and trade, as relations continue to evolve between the two countries.

This relationship is also shown by cultural monuments. South Africa is home to the Liliesleaf Site of Memory and Consciousness, which has exhibitions on the liberation struggle. In recent years, this site has emphasized the role of international solidarity and currently includes an entire exhibit on Swedish involvement in the liberation fight.

== Resident diplomatic missions ==
- South Africa has an embassy in Stockholm.
- Sweden has an embassy in Pretoria.
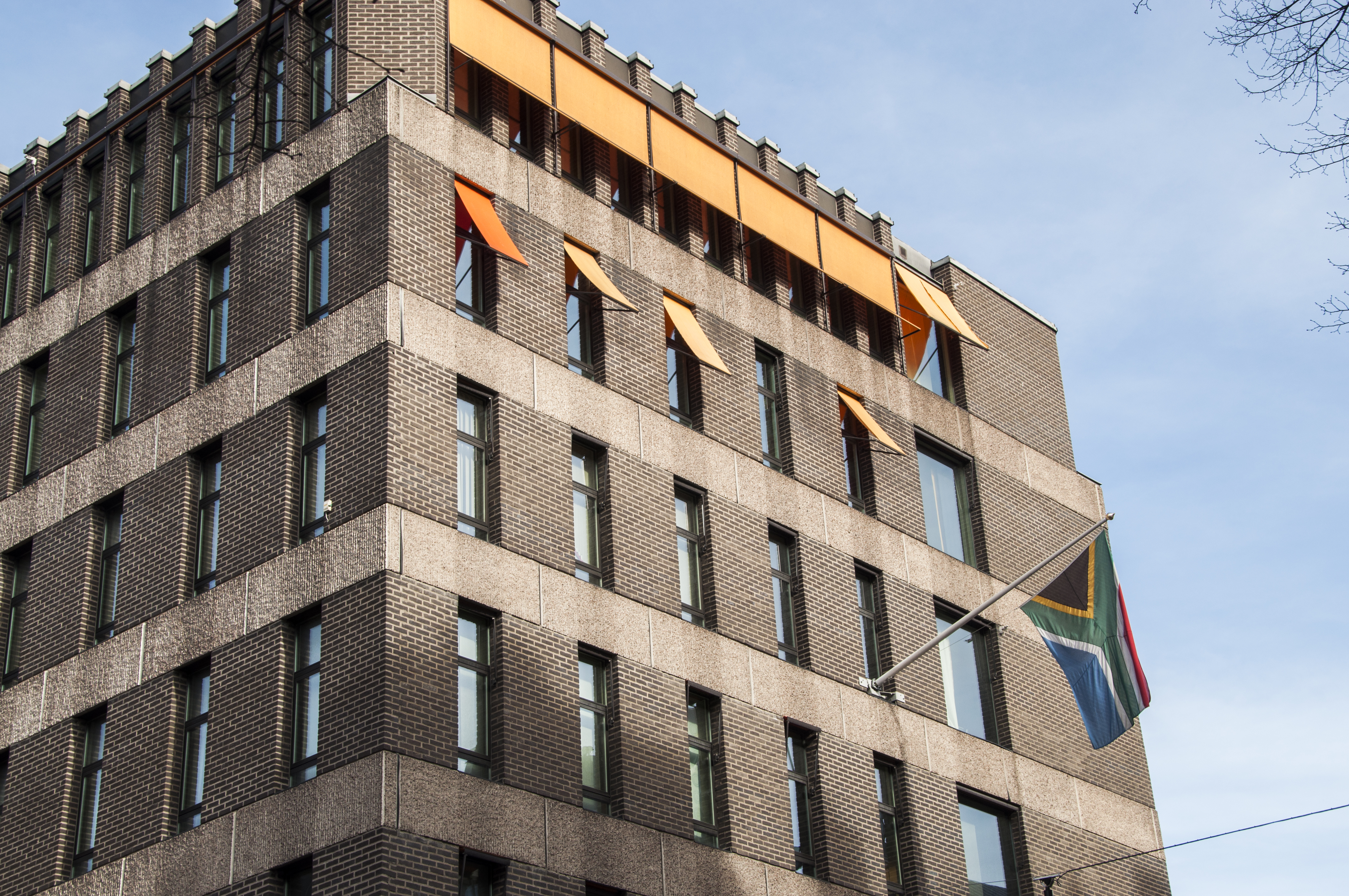
Embassy of South Africa in Stockholm

== See also ==
- Foreign relations of South Africa
- Foreign relations of Sweden
