= Embassy of Sweden, Pretoria =

Diplomatic mission of Sweden in Pretoria, South Africa

- Location: Pretoria
- Address: Postal address Embassy of Sweden; P.O. Box 27987; Sunnyside 0132; South Africa; Visiting address iParioli Complex; 1166 Park Street; Hatfield, Pretoria
- Coordinates: 25.74862°S 28.23777°E
- Opened: 1944
- Ambassador: Anna Karin Eneström
- Jurisdiction: South Africa; Botswana; Namibia; Lesotho
- Website: Official website

The Embassy of Sweden in Pretoria is Sweden's diplomatic mission in South Africa. The Swedish embassy in South Africa represents the Swedish government in South Africa, Botswana, Namibia and Lesotho. The embassy is located in the suburb of Hatfield in the capital of Pretoria.

== History ==
Until 1944, Sweden was represented in the Union of South Africa by a consulate general in Pretoria located in the Prudential House at 235 Pretorius Street. The consulate general was upgraded to a legation in 1944 and Harry Eriksson was appointed Acting Envoy Extraordinary and Minister Plenipotentiary, and became a regular in 1945.

During the 1960s, Sweden upgraded its legations to embassies. However, not the Swedish legation in South Africa. This was due to Sweden's tense relationship with South Africa. It was not until 1 November 1993, after Nelson Mandela's release, that the legation was upgraded to an embassy. The agreement was a step in the normalization of relations between Sweden and South Africa. On the Swedish side, it was a result of the democratic developments in South Africa and the decision to hold democratic elections in April the following year.

== Staff and tasks ==
=== Staff ===
At the embassy, in addition to the ambassador, several staff members are dispatched from the Ministry for Foreign Affairs in Stockholm and the Swedish International Development Cooperation Agency (Sida), along with a defence attaché sent from the Ministry of Defence, and a number of locally employed staff. At Business Sweden in Johannesburg, a trade commissioner is employed.

=== Tasks ===
The embassy's responsibilities include:

- Promotion: The Swedish embassy in Pretoria represents the Swedish government in South Africa, Botswana, Namibia and Lesotho. The embassy's task is to strengthen relations between Sweden and these countries' governments, residents, organizations and companies. The embassy is also responsible for cooperation with the regional Southern African Development Community (SADC) organization based in Gaborone, Botswana. Trade issues are an important part of the embassy's work. The embassy collaborates with Business Sweden to promote trade and investment between Sweden and South Africa, Botswana and Namibia.
- Development Cooperation: The embassy's development work aligns with the regional strategy for Sexual and Reproductive Health and Rights in Africa (2022–2026) and the mission of Team Democracy, ensuring the effective use of synergies.
- Consular and Administrative Affairs: This includes handling passport applications, citizenship matters, and migration cases.

== Buildings ==
=== Chancery ===
The chancery was located at 235 Pretorius Street until 1947. In 1948, it moved 247 Skinner Street (renamed Nana Sita Street in 2012), where it remained until 1953. In 1954, the legation moved to the Van der Stel Building at 177 Pretorius Street. In 2000, the chancery was located in the suburb of Hatfield.

As of 2026 the chancery is located in the iParioli Complex at 1166 Park Street in the suburb of Hatfield in Pretoria. The Danish embassy is located in the same complex.

=== Residence ===
In 1955, a small villa in Pretoria was acquired to serve as the residence of the Swedish minister. In Cape Town, where the envoy spent four to five months each year during the parliamentary session, the Swedish state maintained a villa. The residence in Cape Town was called 'Morgenster' and was located at Brommersvlei Road, Constantia. From at least 1965, the Pretoria residence was located on 180 Nicolson Street in the suburb of Brooklyn.

The decision to build a new residence in South Africa in the early 2000s was the result of the existing residence feeling too small in relation to the "new" South Africa, a country with which Sweden has very good relations since the struggle against apartheid. Money was released through the sale of a former house in Cape Town, an oversized villa with an expression that rhymed poorly with Sweden's identity. The very goal of strengthening Sweden's profile internationally, in accordance with the state's action program for architecture, design and design, became the guiding principle for the work on the new ambassadorial residence. The new residence opened in April 2003 and is located on 297 Canopus Street in Waterkloof Ridge. The house was designed by Anders Landström at Landström Architects. Interior designers were Jonas Bohlin and Jacob Hertzell at Jonas Bohlin Architects. The landscape was designed by Bengt Isling at Nyréns Architects. Architect in South Africa was Boogertman Krige Architects through Ernes Wilken (responsible) and Marlise Teunissen and construction management in South Africa was Kerr Developments through Len Sloan and general contractor was van der Linde & Venter Construction through Gerhard van der Linde, Johan Venter and Arthur Milbrandt. Landström's drawings were praised especially for their well-balanced volumes.

The residence is located on one of Pretoria's green hills overlooking the central parts of the city. Here on the South African plateau, 1,500 meters above sea level, the climate is similar to Swedish summer for most of the year. It does not get too hot and rarely minus degrees, so the need for both heat supply and cooling is small. Apart from the accommodation of the servants, the residence is divided into two: the official spaces with a large hall, library and dining room, and the ambassador's private residence with five rooms and a kitchen. Separate entrances and kitchens prevent the private and the official from colliding. The pool is located secluded. It is an elongated building located along the street that provides a protected garden. As protection for the low-lying morning and evening sun, the building has dense gables. In the middle of the day, the overhanging roofs of the long sides take care of the high-rising sun and shield the glazed rooms. Guests can move freely between the lounge/diner and the furnished garden rooms. A representation part furnished by the Ministry of Foreign Affairs with Swedish interior design is the primary one. There are service and staff rooms for locally employed staff. The ambassador's own private quarters at the top of the house has an unobstructed view of both the city and the garden. The interior of the representation part should give a feeling of simplicity. The floor is made of oak while stairs and other details consist of flamed granite. The ceilings are in white painted wood paneling. In front of the glass surfaces are linen curtains with embroidered Swedish province flowers. The furniture is made in Sweden in genuine materials and with visible signs of craftsmanship. The hall and lounge are neutrally white and light gray. Lighting comes from copper tube chandeliers. The dining room has a green painted wood panel as the room reflects the garden. The library is colored in red with an associated loggia.

== See also ==
- South Africa–Sweden relations
