= Östra Småland =

Local newspaper in Sweden (1928–2019)

- Type: Local newspaper
- Format: Tabloid format
- Owner(s): Swedish Social Democratic Party
- Publisher: Östra Småland AB
- Founded: 1928
- Political alignment: Social democracy
- Language: Swedish
- Ceased publication: 2019
- Headquarters: Kalmar
- Country: Sweden
- ISSN: 1104-0416
- OCLC number: 185290443

Östra Småland, also known as Östran, was a local newspaper based in Kalmar, Sweden. The paper was in circulation between 1928 and 2019.

== History and profile ==
Östra Småland was started in 1928. The paper was owned by the Swedish Social Democratic Party. It was published by Östra Småland AB, a subsidiary of Gota Media AB which acquired the company in 2011. The paper had a social democratic political stance. It was published in tabloid format.

In the second half of the 1950s Östra Småland enjoyed higher levels of circulation. In December 2019 the paper ceased publication due to low profitability. Gunilla Persson was the last editor-in-chief of Östra Småland.
