= Minister (diplomatic rank) =

Diplomatic function, head of a delegation

An envoy extraordinary and minister plenipotentiary, commonly known as a minister, is a diplomatic rank. In matters of diplomatic rank precedence, a minister ranked below an ambassador. A minister is a diplomat of the second class who had plenipotentiary powers, the full authority to represent their government. However, unlike ambassadors, ministers did not serve as the personal representative of their country's head of state.

== Formerly as the head of a diplomatic mission ==
A diplomatic mission headed by an envoy was known as a legation rather than an embassy.

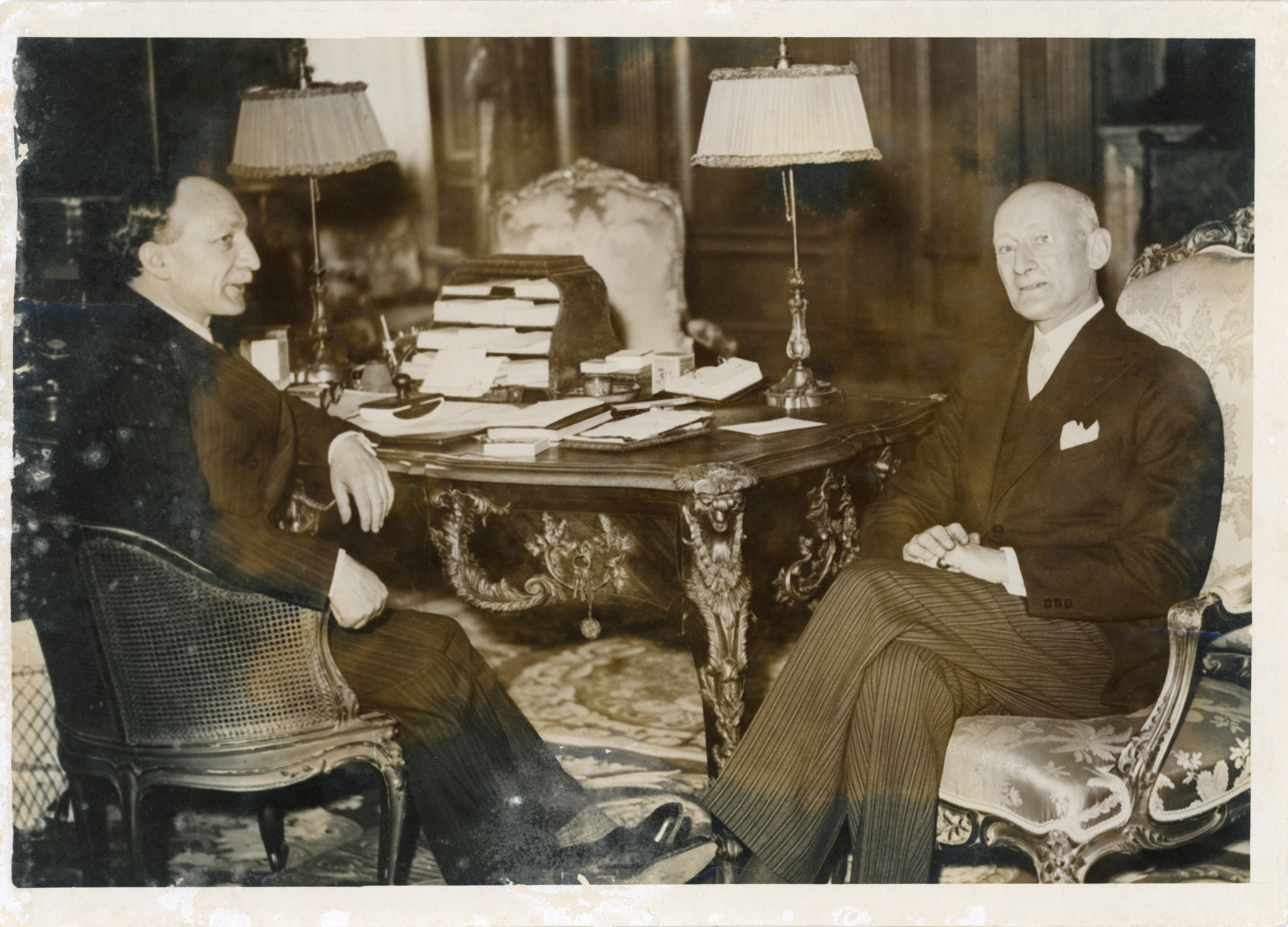
On the afternoon of 8 March 1938, Walter Stucki, the designated Envoy of the Swiss Confederation to France (right), and the French Foreign Minister Yvon Delbos met for talks in Delbos' office at the Ministry for Foreign Affairs.

Until the first decades of the 20th century, most diplomatic missions were legations headed by diplomats of the envoy rank. Ambassadors were only exchanged between great powers, close allies, and related monarchies.

After World War II it was no longer considered acceptable to treat some nations as inferior to others, given the United Nations doctrine of equality of sovereign states. The rank of envoy gradually became obsolete as countries upgraded their relations to the ambassadorial rank. The envoy rank still existed in 1961, when the Vienna Convention on Diplomatic Relations was signed, but it did not outlive the decade. The last remaining American legations, in the Warsaw Pact countries of Bulgaria and Hungary, were upgraded to embassies in 1966.

The last minister's legation in the world was the Swedish legation in Pretoria, led by the Swedish minister to South Africa, Ingemar Stjernberg. The minister and legation were respectively upgraded to the level of "Ambassador Extraordinary and Plenipotentiary" and "Embassy" on 1 November 1993.
