= Swedish Committee for Afghanistan =

Foreign aid organisation

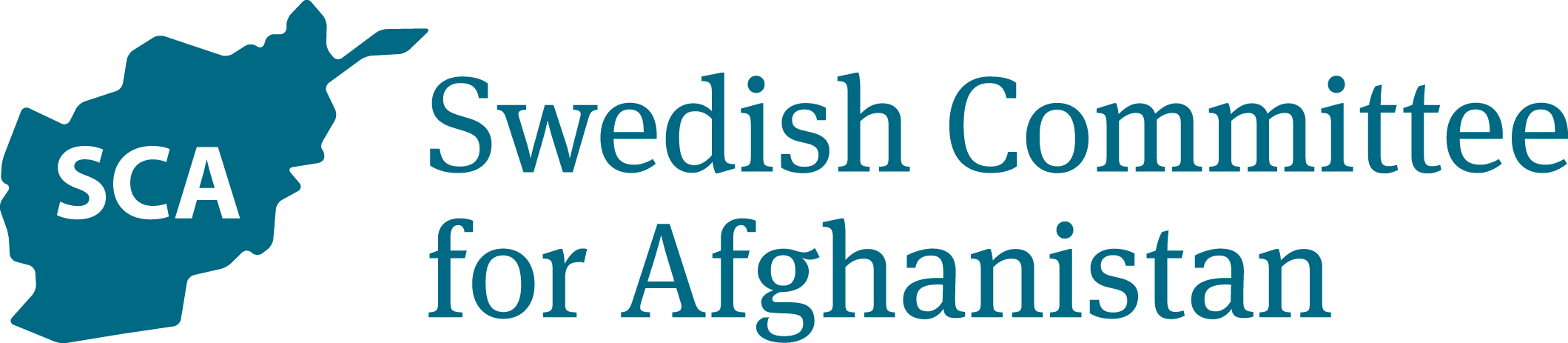
- Logo
- Abbreviation: SCA
- Founded: 1980
- Type: Non-governmental organisation
- Purpose: Healthcare, primary school education, rural development, support to people with disability
- Headquarters: Stockholm
- Location: Sweden
- Region served: Afghanistan

The Swedish Committee for Afghanistan (SCA), was formed in 1980, as a reaction to the Soviet invasion. It became a prominent a Swedish non-governmental foreign aid organisation active in providing aid to people in Afghanistan.The SCA was active in Afghanistan from 1982 to 2024, as a politically and religiously neutral NGO with a goal to help Afghanistan to become a peaceful and stable country where human rights are respected, rural communities are empowered and all Afghans have the right and opportunity to democratic participation in the governance of their country.

SCA's main target groups were the rural population, specifically women, girls and persons with disabilities. The work was always conducted in close cooperation with the local population

SCA's work has over the years mainly covered programmes for education, health, support to persons with disabilities and rural development. In 2023, SCA had 7 000 employees, of whom more than 99 percent were Afghans. The main administrative office in Afghanistan was located in the capital of Kabul. Field operations were carried out in 17 provinces organised from five regional offices in Mazar-i-Sharif, Taloqan, Ghazni, Jalalabad and Wardak.

In 2024, the organisation ceased all activities in Afghanistan and closed all offices in the country. This was in response to the Taliban government's suspension of Swedish organisations in response to the 2023 Quran burnings in Sweden.
