= Waterkloof Ridge =

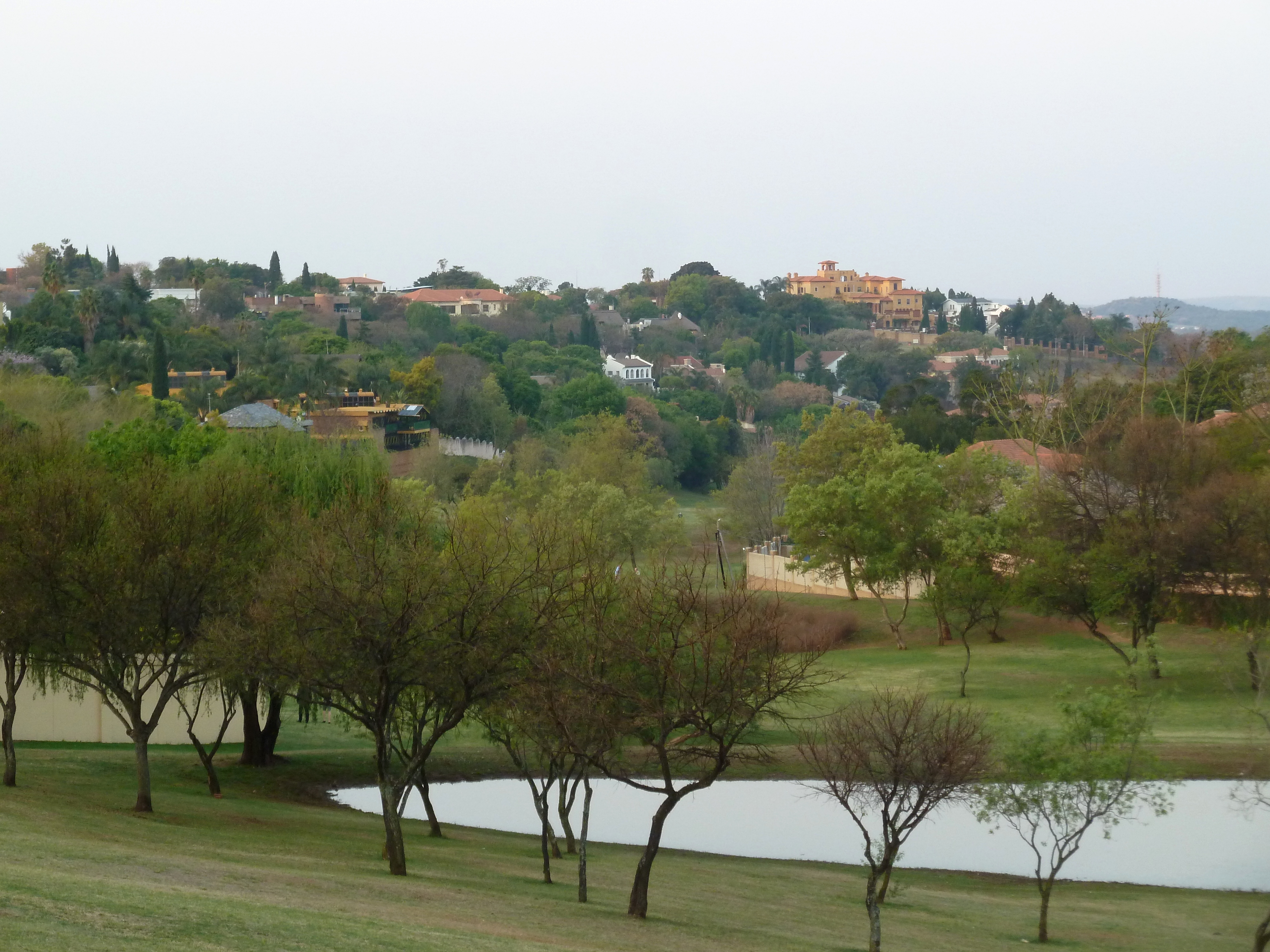
- View over Waterkloof Ridge

- Location within Gauteng Location within South Africa
- Coordinates: 25°48′44″S 28°14′40″E
- Country: South Africa
- Province: Gauteng
- Municipality: City of Tshwane
- Main Place: Pretoria

Area
  - Total: 6.05 km^{2} (2.34 sq mi)

Population (2011)
  - Total: 8,136
  - Density: 1,340/km^{2} (3,480/sq mi)

Racial makeup (2011)
  - Black African: 27.7%
  - Coloured: 1.5%
  - Indian/Asian: 1.5%
  - White: 67.2%
  - Other: 2.1%

First languages (2011)
  - Afrikaans: 45.9%
  - English: 31.7%
  - Northern Sotho: 3.8%
  - Tswana: 3.0%
  - Other: 15.7%
- Time zone: UTC+2 (SAST)
- Postal code (street): 0181

Waterkloof Ridge (Afrikaans: "Waterkloofrif") is a residential suburb of the city of Pretoria, South Africa. Originally called Highlands - where so called Coloureds, Blacks & some Indians lived & schooled - before they were displaced to 'separate development areas' as per the South African National Party Apartheid system, Waterkloof Ridge is located to the south of Waterkloof in a leafy area that contains some of the city's most expensive real estate, as is the case in much of the surrounding region.

== See also ==
- AFB Waterkloof, an air force base located just west of Waterkloof Ridge in Centurion, Gauteng.
- Hoërskool Waterkloof, large Afrikaans High School situated between Waterkloof Ridge and Erasmuskloof.
