= List of ambassadors of Sweden to Syria =

Ambassador of Sweden to Syria
- Lesser coat of arms of the Kingdom of Sweden
- Incumbent; Jessica Svärdström since August 2026
- Ministry for Foreign Affairs; Swedish Embassy, Damascus
- Style: His or Her Excellency (formal); Mr. or Madam Ambassador (informal)
- Reports to: Minister for Foreign Affairs
- Seat: Damascus, Syria
- Appointer: Government of Sweden
- Term length: No fixed term
- Inaugural holder: Widar Bagge
- Formation: 1947
- Website: Swedish Embassy, Damascus

The Ambassador of Sweden to Syria (known formally as the Ambassador of the Kingdom of Sweden to the Syrian Arab Republic) is the official representative of the government of Sweden to the president of Syria and government of Syria.

== History ==
Sweden recognized Syria and Lebanon as independent states on 2 November 1945. Sweden and Syria established diplomatic relations in 1946. In the council on 7 February 1947, Sweden's minister in Cairo, Envoy Widar Bagge, was appointed as envoy to both Damascus and Beirut, while remaining stationed in Cairo. In June 1957, Åke Sjölin was appointed as Sweden's first resident envoy in Beirut, with concurrent accreditation in, among other places, Damascus.

In 1958, Syria entered into a political union with Egypt, forming the United Arab Republic, after which the Swedish envoy in Beirut was no longer accredited in Damascus. In 1961, Syria seceded from the union following the 1961 Syrian coup d'état. On 1 February 1962, Gösta Brunnström presented his credentials to Syria's president, Dr. Nazim al-Qudsi, in his capacity as Sweden's new ambassador to Syria. Brunnström thus became the first Swedish ambassador to Syria since 1958, when the country merged with Egypt.

In 1974, Sweden opened an embassy office in Damascus, which was subordinate to the Swedish embassy in Beirut and headed by a chargé d'affaires ad interim until August 1983, when Göran Berg was appointed as Sweden's first resident ambassador to the newly established independent embassy in Damascus.

On 29 March 2012, the Swedish Ministry for Foreign Affairs decided to scale down operations and staff at the embassy in Damascus until further notice. Due to the developments, the embassy in Damascus has not been continuously staffed, and its operations have since been primarily conducted from Beirut. Since then the Sweden's ambassador to Lebanon served as chargé d'affaires in Syria. In June 2026, a resident ambassador was once again appointed to Damascus, with the appointment taking effect in August of the same year.

== List of representatives ==
Name	Period	Resident/Non resident	Title	Notes	Ref
First Syrian Republic (1930–1950)
Widar Bagge	1947–1950	Non-resident	Envoy	Resident in Cairo.	
Second Syrian Republic (1950–1958) and Syrian Arab Republic (1961–1963)
Widar Bagge	1950–1951	Non-resident	Envoy	Resident in Cairo.	
Gustaf Weidel	1951–1955	Non-resident	Envoy	Resident in Cairo.	
Brynolf Eng	1955–1957	Non-resident	Envoy	Resident in Cairo.	
Åke Sjölin	1957–1958	Non-resident	Envoy	Resident in Beirut.	
–	1958–1961	Non-resident	–	None during the political union with Egypt.	
Gösta Brunnström	1961–1963	Non-resident	Ambassador	Resident in Beirut.	
Syrian Arab Republic (1963–2024)
Gösta Brunnström	1963–1965	Non-resident	Ambassador	Resident in Beirut.	
Claës Ivar Wollin	1965–1969	Non-resident	Ambassador	Resident in Beirut.	
Åke Jonsson	1969–1974	Non-resident	Ambassador	Resident in Beirut.	
Jean-Jacques von Dardel	1974–1978	Non-resident	Ambassador	Resident in Beirut (until 25 March 1976 (Note: The Swedish embassy in Beirut was evacuated by order of the Ministry for Foreign Affairs on 25 March 1976.)).	
Göran Wide	1976 (Note: Göran Wide served in Damascus from 1974, the same year the embassy office opened, but it is uncertain whether he was chargé d'affaires ad interim for the first two years.)–1979	Resident	Chargé d'affaires ad interim (Note: He held the following diplomatic ranks: Vice consul (1974–1976), consul (1976–1977), and embassy counselor (1977–1979).)		
Sten Strömholm	1979–1983	Non-resident	Ambassador	Resident in Beirut.	
Ingmar Karlsson	1979–1983	Resident	Chargé d'affaires ad interim (Note: He held the following diplomatic ranks: embassy counselor)		
Göran Berg	1983–1987	Resident	Ambassador		
Rolf Gauffin	1987–1991	Resident	Ambassador	Also accredited to Beirut (from 1990).	
Stig Elvemar	1991–1994	Resident	Ambassador	Also accredited to Beirut.	
Jan Axel Nordlander	1994–1997	Resident	Ambassador	Also accredited to Beirut.	
Tommy Arwitz	1997–2001	Resident	Ambassador	Also accredited to Beirut (until 1999 (Note: Sweden reopened its embassy in Beirut in 1999 but closed it two years later, after which the Swedish ambassador in Damascus was once again given concurrent accreditation to Beirut in 2001.)).	
Viola Furubjelke	2001–2005	Resident	Ambassador	Also accredited to Beirut.	
Catharina Kipp	2005–2008	Resident	Ambassador	Also accredited to Beirut.	
Niklas Kebbon	13 October 2008 – 2014	Resident (Note: On 29 March 2012, the Swedish Ministry for Foreign Affairs decided to scale down operations and staff at the embassy in Damascus until further notice. Due to the developments of the civil war, the embassy in Damascus has not been continuously staffed, and its operations have since been primarily conducted from Beirut.)	Ambassador	Also accredited to Beirut.	
Diana Janse	October 2014 – 2015	Non-resident	Chargé d'affaires	Resident in Beirut.	
Mikael Staaf	2015–2015	Non-resident	Chargé d'affaires ad interim	Resident in Beirut.	
Peter Semneby	2015–2017	Non-resident	Chargé d'affaires	Resident in Beirut.	
Jörgen Lindström	September 2017 – August 2020	Non-resident	Chargé d'affaires	Resident in Beirut.	
Ann Dismorr	September 2020 – 2024	Non-resident	Chargé d'affaires	Resident in Beirut.	
Syrian Arab Republic (2024–present)
Jessica Svärdström	2024 – August 2026	Non-resident	Chargé d'affaires	Resident in Beirut.	
Jessica Svärdström	August 2026 – present	Resident	Ambassador		

== See also ==
- Sweden–Syria relations
