= List of ambassadors of Sweden to North Yemen =

Ambassador of Sweden to North Yemen
- Lesser coat of arms of the Kingdom of Sweden
- Ministry for Foreign Affairs; Swedish Embassy, Riyadh
- Style: His or Her Excellency (formal); Mr. or Madam Ambassador (informal)
- Reports to: Minister for Foreign Affairs
- Seat: Lebanon and Saudi Arabia (Note: The ambassador was based at the Swedish Embassy in Beirut (1971–1974), at the Swedish Embassy in Jeddah, Saudi Arabia (1974–1984) and then in Riyadh (1985–1990) after the embassy moved there from Jeddah.)
- Appointer: Government of Sweden
- Term length: No fixed term
- Formation: December 1970
- First holder: Åke Jonsson
- Final holder: Lennart Alvin
- Abolished: 1990
- Superseded by: Ambassador of Sweden to Yemen

The Ambassador of Sweden to North Yemen (known formally as the Ambassador of the Kingdom of Sweden to the Yemen Arab Republic) was the official representative of the government of Sweden to the government of North Yemen and the president of the Yemen Arab Republic between 1970 and the Yemeni unification in 1990.

== History ==
In December 1970, an agreement was reached on the establishment of diplomatic relations between Sweden and the Yemen Arab Republic (North Yemen), as well as between Sweden and the People's Democratic Republic of Yemen (South Yemen). Sweden's ambassador in Beirut, Åke Jonsson, was appointed ambassador also to the North Yemeni capital, Sanaa. Sweden's ambassador in Addis Ababa, Carl Bergenstråhle, was appointed ambassador also to the South Yemeni capital, Aden.

In April 1971, Ambassador Åke Jonsson, as Sweden's first ambassador to this country, presented his credentials to the President of the Republican Council, Abdul Rahman al-Eryani, who was the head of state of North Yemen.

Sweden has never had a resident Swedish ambassador in Sanaa. Instead, Sweden's ambassador in Lebanon was accredited in Sanaa from 1971 to 1974, and Sweden's ambassador in Saudi Arabia was accredited in Sanaa from 1974 onward.

The Yemeni unification took place on 22 May 1990, when the People's Democratic Republic of Yemen (South Yemen) and the Yemen Arab Republic (North Yemen) united, forming the Republic of Yemen. Sweden's ambassador to Saudi Arabia, Lennart Alvin, who had been accredited as Swedish ambassador to North Yemen since 1987, was now accredited to the new republic.

== List of representatives ==
Name	Period	Title	Notes	Ref
Åke Jonsson	1971–1974	Ambassador	Resident in Beirut.	
Bengt Rösiö	1974–1977	Ambassador	Resident in Jeddah.	
Carl-Gustaf Bielke	1977–1980	Ambassador	Resident in Jeddah.	
Fredrik Bergenstråhle	1980–1984	Ambassador	Resident in Jeddah.	
Frank Belfrage	1984–1987	Ambassador	Resident in Riyadh. (Note: Jeddah (1984–1985), Riyadh (1985–1987).)	
Lennart Alvin	1987–1990	Ambassador	Resident in Riyadh.	

== See also ==
- List of ambassadors of Sweden to Yemen
- List of ambassadors of Sweden to South Yemen
