= List of ambassadors of Sweden to South Yemen =

Ambassador of Sweden to South Yemen
- Lesser coat of arms of the Kingdom of Sweden
- Ministry for Foreign Affairs
- Style: His or Her Excellency (formal); Mr. or Madam Ambassador (informal)
- Reports to: Minister for Foreign Affairs
- Seat: Addis Ababa and Stockholm (Note: The ambassador was based at the Swedish Embassy in Addis Ababa, Ethiopia (1971–1981), at the Ministry for Foreign Affairs in Stockholm, Sweden (1981–1990).)
- Appointer: Government of Sweden
- Term length: No fixed term
- Formation: December 1970
- First holder: Carl Bergenstråhle
- Final holder: Lars Schönander
- Abolished: 1990
- Superseded by: Ambassador of Sweden to Yemen

The Ambassador of Sweden to South Yemen (known formally as the Ambassador of the Kingdom of Sweden to the People's Democratic Republic of Yemen) was the official representative of the government of Sweden to the government of South Yemen and the president of South Yemen between 1970 and the Yemeni unification in 1990.

== History ==
In January 1968, Sweden recognized the People's Democratic Republic of Yemen (South Yemen). In a telegram to the government of South Yemen, Sweden's Minister for Foreign Affairs, Torsten Nilsson, expressed the hope that friendly and cordial relations would be established between the two countries.

In December 1970, an agreement was reached on the establishment of diplomatic relations between Sweden and South Yemen, as well as between Sweden and North Yemen. Sweden's ambassador in Addis Ababa, Carl Bergenstråhle, was appointed ambassador also to the South Yemeni capital, Aden. Sweden's ambassador in Beirut, Åke Jonsson, was appointed ambassador also to the North Yemeni capital, Sanaa.

Sweden has never had a resident Swedish ambassador in Aden. Instead, Sweden's ambassador in Ethiopia was accredited in Aden from 1971 to 1981. From 1981 onward, a Stockholm-based ambassador was accredited in South Yemen.

The Yemeni unification took place on 22 May 1990, when the People's Democratic Republic of Yemen (South Yemen) and the Yemen Arab Republic (North Yemen) united, forming the Republic of Yemen. Sweden's ambassador to Saudi Arabia, Lennart Alvin, who had been accredited as Swedish ambassador to North Yemen since 1987, was now accredited to the new republic.

== List of representatives ==
| Name | Period | Title | Notes | Ref |
|---|---|---|---|---|
| Carl Bergenstråhle | 1971–1972 | Ambassador | Resident in Addis Ababa. | |
| Lars Hedström | 1973–1975 | Ambassador | Resident in Addis Ababa. | |
| Bengt Friedman | 1976–1978 | Ambassador | Resident in Addis Ababa. | |
| Arne Helleryd | 1978–1981 | Ambassador | Resident in Addis Ababa. | |
| Arne Fältheim | 1981–1983 | Ambassador | Resident in Stockholm. | |
| Finn Bergstrand | 1983–1986 | Ambassador | Resident in Stockholm. | |
| Lars Arnö | 1986–1988 | Ambassador | Resident in Stockholm. | |
| Lars Schönander | 1989–1990 | Ambassador | Resident in Stockholm. | |

== See also ==
- List of ambassadors of Sweden to Yemen
- List of ambassadors of Sweden to North Yemen
