= Jan Lundvik =

Swedish diplomat (born 1933)

- Born: Jan Otto Lundvik; 20 June 1933 (age 93); Helsingborg, Sweden
- Education: Skellefteå högre allmänna läroverk
- Alma mater: Lund University
- Occupation: Diplomat
- Years active: 1960–2002
- Spouse(s): Birthe Sönderlund (m. 1957, divorced) Ulla Margareta Norin
- Partner: Lenke Rothman (1998–2008)

Jan Otto Lundvik (born 20 June 1933) is a retired Swedish diplomat who began his career as a translator at the Swedish Embassy in Budapest (1960–1962) before joining the Ministry for Foreign Affairs in Stockholm as an attaché. He served in Helsinki, Monrovia, Addis Ababa, and Moscow, and held senior positions at the Ministry, including deputy director and director. Lundvik represented Sweden at the UN in New York City, serving as vice-chairperson of the Special Committee on Decolonization (C-24) in 1984–1985, and was appointed envoy to Pretoria in 1985.

Lundvik later served as Consul General in Berlin, overseeing cultural relations and the Swedish Embassy's relocation from Bonn to Berlin, and was accredited as ambassador to Moldova in 1992. From 1994 to 1998, he served as Sweden's ambassador to Hungary, co-founding the Swedish-Hungarian Chamber of Commerce and playing a key role in preserving the memory of Raoul Wallenberg. After retirement, Lundvik remained active in Swedish-Hungarian relations and led investigations into the Wallenberg case at the Ministry for Foreign Affairs.

== Early life ==
Lundvik was born on 20 June 1933 in Helsingborg, Sweden, the son of physician Lars Lundvik and Vendela (née Burman). He grew up in Värnamo but attended Skellefteå högre allmänna läroverk in Skellefteå, as Värnamo did not have a secondary school at the time. As a student, he showed a strong interest in the English language and subscribed to The Times Weekly. He enjoyed reading authors such as Graham Greene, James Joyce, Charles Dickens, and Robert Louis Stevenson.

In 1951, Lundvik won a national current affairs competition organized by the Swedish Students' Temperance Society (Sveriges studerande ungdoms helnykterhetsförbund, SSHU), which attracted 21,000 participants. The same year, he and a female student were selected by a jury at the Swedish Publicists' Association in Stockholm to represent Sweden at the World Youth Forum in London, an annual event jointly organized by Svenska Dagbladet and the Daily Mail.

He earned a Bachelor of Arts degree from Lund University in 1956.

== Career ==
Jan Lundvik began his career as a translator at the Swedish Embassy in Budapest from 1960 to 1962. He joined the Ministry for Foreign Affairs in Stockholm as an attaché in 1962 and subsequently served in Helsinki (1964–1965), Monrovia (1966), Addis Ababa (1967–1968), and again in Helsinki (1968–1972). He became a desk officer (departementssekreterare) at the Ministry in 1972.

In 1976, while serving as a desk officer, Lundvik accompanied Kaj Björk, Sweden's ambassador to China, on a visit to Cambodia—the first Western delegation admitted after the Khmer Rouge takeover in 1975. The delegation described the revolution as successful and dismissed reports of mass killings. In a later interview with Bosse Lindquist for the 1999 radio documentary The Silence in Phnom Penh, Lundvik explained that the trip's main purpose had been to offer Cambodia five million dollars in Swedish aid, and that there was little real interest in uncovering disturbing truths. He also noted that Sweden's strong pro-Vietnam and anti-U.S. sentiment at the time influenced the group's stance: "This was fact-finding," he said, "and even if the only facts available were those presented by the regime, we had to settle for that and leave deeper analysis to others."

Lundvik was appointed deputy director (kansliråd) at the Ministry in 1976, director (departementsråd) in 1977, and minister at the Swedish Embassy in Moscow in 1978. He held a special assignment at the Ministry in 1980 and served as minister at Sweden's UN delegation in New York City from 1981. During his time at the United Nations, he was vice-chairperson of the Special Committee on Decolonization (C-24) in 1984 and 1985.

He became envoy to Pretoria in 1985. After Nelson Mandela's release from prison on 11 February 1990, Lundvik met him in his Soweto home on 20 February. Sweden was the first country outside Africa that Mandela later visited, three weeks after their meeting.

In 1990, Lundvik was appointed Consul General in Berlin, where he promoted cultural relations between Sweden and Germany and prepared the relocation of the Swedish Embassy from Bonn to Berlin. The Consulate General also assumed responsibility for relations with Moldova in 1992, and Lundvik was accredited as ambassador there the same year. In 1994, when he became ambassador to Hungary, responsibility for Moldova was transferred to the embassy in Budapest.

Lundvik served as Sweden's Ambassador to Hungary from 1994 to 1998. He maintained a lifelong interest in the country, its language, and its history. During his ambassadorship, he co-founded the Swedish-Hungarian Chamber of Commerce, which later honored him for his contributions. He played a key role in preserving the memory of Raoul Wallenberg, helping to establish a memorial plaque in 1994 honoring Ivan Danielsson, Wallenberg, and Per Anger, and facilitating Per Anger's visit to Budapest. Lundvik also conducted important research to identify Wallenberg's Hungarian staff and the local contacts listed in his notes. In 1999–2000, he participated in the Swedish-Russian Raoul Wallenberg Working Group. Even after retirement, he remained active in strengthening Swedish-Hungarian relations and promoting the remembrance of Wallenberg and other heroes who saved lives in Budapest.

After his retirement, Lundvik remained active in promoting Swedish-Hungarian relations and the remembrance of Wallenberg. He was for many years responsible for investigations into the Wallenberg case at the Ministry for Foreign Affairs.

== Personal life ==
In 1957, Lundvik married Birthe Sönderlund (born 1933), the daughter of senior teacher Oluf Sönderlund and Karen (née Bach). The marriage ended in divorce.

In 1998, at the inauguration of the Raoul Wallenberg memorial To Remember the Deed ("Att minnas den goda gärningen") in the Swedish Parliament, Lundvik met the artist, painter, and writer Lenke Rothman, with whom he lived until her death in 2008. They resided on Lidingö. After Rothman's death, Lundvik returned to Scania and settled in Höganäs.

He later married Ulla Margareta Norin (born 1936). He moved to the Sälgen retirement home in Höganäs on 21 December 2024.

== Awards ==
- (Hungary) Wallenberg Centennial Award (2012)

Diplomatic posts
Preceded by Olov Ternström	Deputy Permanent Representative of Sweden to the United Nations; 1981–1985	Succeeded by Sten Strömholm
Preceded by Arne Helleryd	Envoy of Sweden to South Africa; 1985–1990	Succeeded by Ingemar Stjernberg
Preceded by Ingemar Stjernberg	Consul General of Sweden to Berlin; 1990–1994	Succeeded by None
Preceded by None	Ambassador of Sweden to Moldova; 1992–1998	Succeeded by Göran Jacobsson
Preceded by Sten Strömholm	Ambassador of Sweden to Hungary; 1994–1998	Succeeded by Staffan Carlsson
