= List of ambassadors of Sweden to Jordan =

Ambassador of Sweden to Jordan
- Lesser coat of arms of the Kingdom of Sweden
- Incumbent; Maria Sargren since 2024
- Ministry for Foreign Affairs; Swedish Embassy, Amman
- Style: His or Her Excellency (formal); Mr. or Madam Ambassador (informal)
- Reports to: Minister for Foreign Affairs
- Seat: Amman, Jordan
- Appointer: Government of Sweden
- Term length: No fixed term
- Inaugural holder: Åke Sjölin
- Formation: 1957
- Website: Swedish Embassy, Amman

The Ambassador of Sweden to Jordan (known formally as the Ambassador of the Kingdom of Sweden to the Hashemite Kingdom of Jordan) is the official representative of the government of Sweden to the king of Jordan and government of Jordan.

== History ==
Sweden's first envoy accredited in Amman was Åke Sjölin, who was resident in Beirut. He presented his credentials to King Hussein of Jordan on 14 December 1957.

In 1960, an agreement was reached between the Swedish and Jordanian governments regarding diplomatic representation in their respective countries. When Sweden's newly appointed envoy in Beirut, Gösta Brunnström, was also accredited in Amman, he was appointed ambassador there.

On 15 November 1981, State Secretary for Foreign Affairs Leif Leifland officiated at the inauguration of Sweden's new embassy in Amman. The ambassador continued to be resident in Beirut, and in his absence, the embassy was managed by a first embassy secretary in the capacity of chargé d'affaires ad interim.

Due to the unstable situation in Lebanon and concern for the safety of personnel, no posted officials were assigned to the Embassy in Beirut during the period February–September 1984. From the autumn of 1984, the head of mission was stationed in Amman with concurrent accreditation to Beirut, where the mission was led by a chargé d'affaires ad interim.

== List of representatives ==
Name	Period	Resident / Non-resident	Title	Resident / Concurrent accreditation	Notes	Presented credentials	Ref
Åke Sjölin	1957–1960	Non-resident	Envoy	Resident in Beirut			
Gösta Brunnström	1960–1965	Non-resident	Ambassador	Resident in Beirut		5 June 1960	
Claës Ivar Wollin	1965–1969	Non-resident	Ambassador	Resident in Beirut			
Åke Jonsson	1969–1974	Non-resident	Ambassador	Resident in Beirut			
Jean-Jacques von Dardel	1974–1978	Non-resident	Ambassador	Resident in Beirut			
Sten Strömholm	1979–1983	Non-resident	Ambassador	Resident in Beirut			
Mathias Mossberg	1981–1984	Resident	Chargé d'affaires ad interim (Note: Held the diplomatic rank of first embassy secretary.)				
Ingemar Stjernberg	1983–1986	Non-resident (Note: Stjernberg was officially Swedish ambassador to Beirut with concurrent accreditation to Amman. Due to the unstable situation in Lebanon and concern for the safety of personnel, no posted officials were assigned to the Embassy in Beirut during the period February–September 1984. From the autumn of 1984, Ambassador Stjernberg was stationed in Amman with concurrent accreditation to Beirut, where the mission was led by a chargé d'affaires ad interim. He was stationed in Stockholm from New Year's Eve 1985.)	Ambassador	Resident in Beirut			
Helena Ödmark	1984–1985	Resident	Chargé d'affaires ad interim (Note: Held the diplomatic rank of first embassy secretary.)				
Lars Lönnback	1986–1990	Resident	Ambassador				
Christian Bausch	1990–1995	Resident	Ambassador				
Agneta Bohman	1995–1999	Resident	Ambassador				
Klas Gierow	1999–2004	Resident	Ambassador				
Tommy Arwitz	2004–2008	Resident	Ambassador				
Charlotta Sparre	2008–2013	Resident	Ambassador				
Helena Gröndahl Rietz	2013–2016	Resident	Ambassador				
Erik Ullenhag	September 2016 – 2020	Resident	Ambassador				
Alexandra Rydmark	September 2020 – 2024	Resident	Ambassador				
Maria Sargren	2024–present	Resident	Ambassador			10 December 2024	
