= List of ambassadors of Sweden to Moldova =

Ambassador of Sweden to Moldova
- Lesser coat of arms of the Kingdom of Sweden
- Incumbent; Petra Lärke since 2025
- Ministry for Foreign Affairs; Swedish Embassy, Chișinău
- Style: His or Her Excellency (formal); Mr. or Madam Ambassador (informal)
- Reports to: Minister for Foreign Affairs
- Seat: Chișinău, Moldova
- Appointer: Government of Sweden
- Term length: No fixed term
- Inaugural holder: Jan Lundvik
- Formation: 1992
- Website: Swedish Embassy, Chișinău

The Ambassador of Sweden to Moldova (known formally as the Ambassador of the Kingdom of Sweden to the Republic of Moldova) is the official representative of the government of Sweden to the government of Moldova and the president of Moldova.

== History ==
On 2 April 1992, the Swedish government recognized the Republic of Moldova. On 27 May 1992, the Swedish government decided to enter into an agreement with Moldova to establish diplomatic relations. The agreement entered into force on 12 June 1992, upon its signing in Moscow by Ambassador Örjan Berner on behalf of Sweden, and Ion Cebuc on behalf of Moldova.

The Consulate General in Berlin, under the leadership of Consul General Jan Lundvik, was given responsibility for relations with Moldova in 1992, and that same year he was accredited as ambassador there. In 1994, the responsibility for Moldova was transferred to the embassy in Budapest when Jan Lundvik became ambassador there. The Swedish ambassador to Moldova was resident in neighoring countries from 1992 to 2010: Berlin (1992–1994), Budapest (1994–1998), Kiev (1998–2000), and Bucharest (2000–2010),

The Swedish Embassy in Chișinău was inaugurated on 30 September 2010. The ceremony was attended by Sweden's Minister for Foreign Affairs, Carl Bildt; Moldova's Acting President, Mihai Ghimpu; and Iurie Leancă, Minister of Foreign Affairs and European Integration.

== List of representatives ==
Name	Period	Title	Notes	Ref
Jan Lundvik	1992–1994	Ambassador	Resident in Berlin.	
Jan Lundvik	1994–1998	Ambassador	Resident in Budapest.	
Göran Jacobsson	1998–2000	Ambassador	Resident in Kiev.	
Nils Gunnar Revelius	2000–2001	Ambassador	Resident in Bucharest.	
Svante Kilander	2001–2006	Ambassador	Resident in Bucharest.	
Mats Åberg	2006–2010	Ambassador	Resident in Bucharest.	
Ingrid Tersman	2010–2015	Ambassador		
Signe Burgstaller	2015–2018	Ambassador		
Anna Lyberg	1 September 2018 – 2021	Ambassador		
Katarina Fried	2021–2025	Ambassador		
Petra Lärke	2025–present	Ambassador		

== Gallery ==
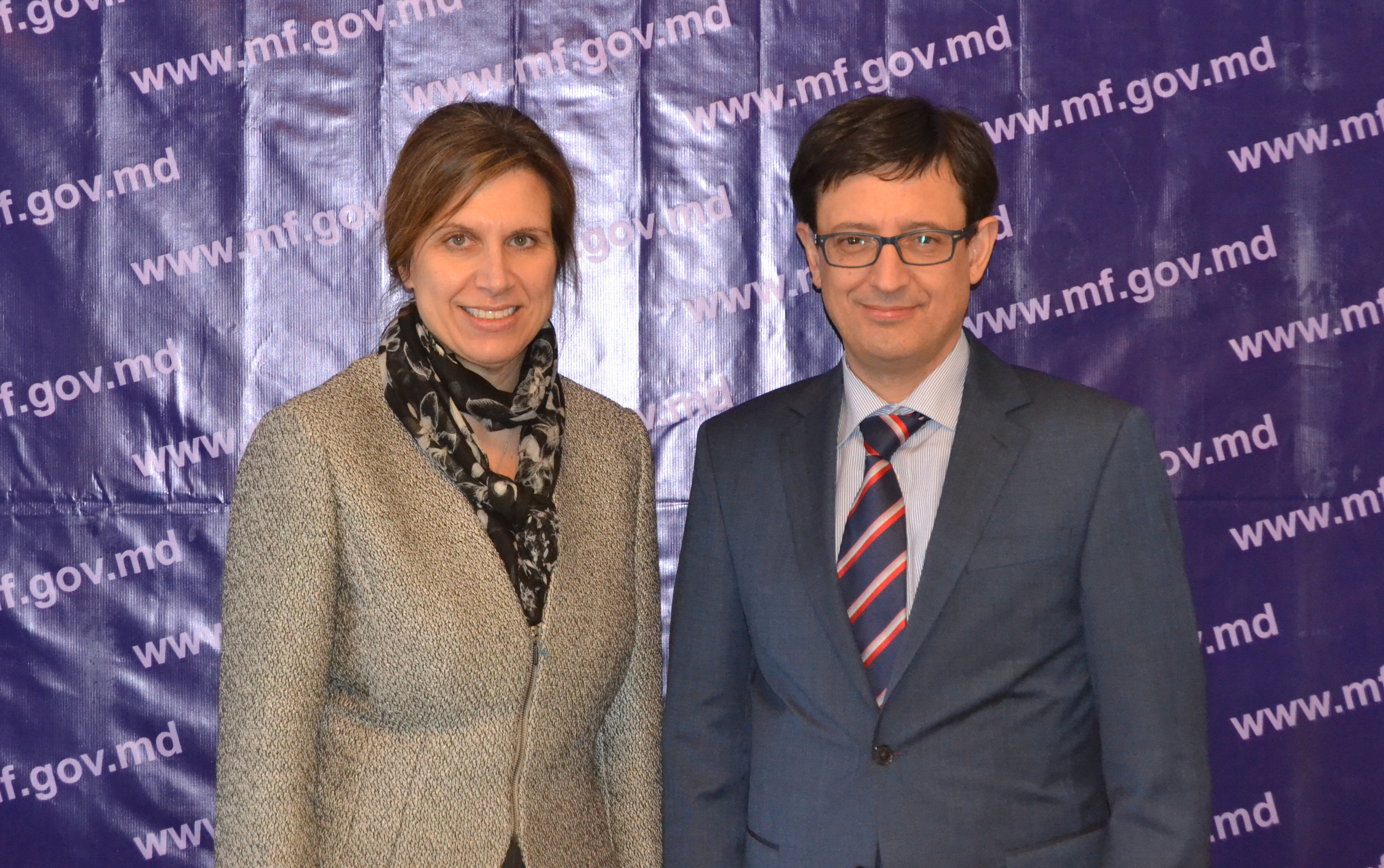
Ambassador Signe Burgstaller (2015–2018) and Minister of Finance Octavian Armașu.

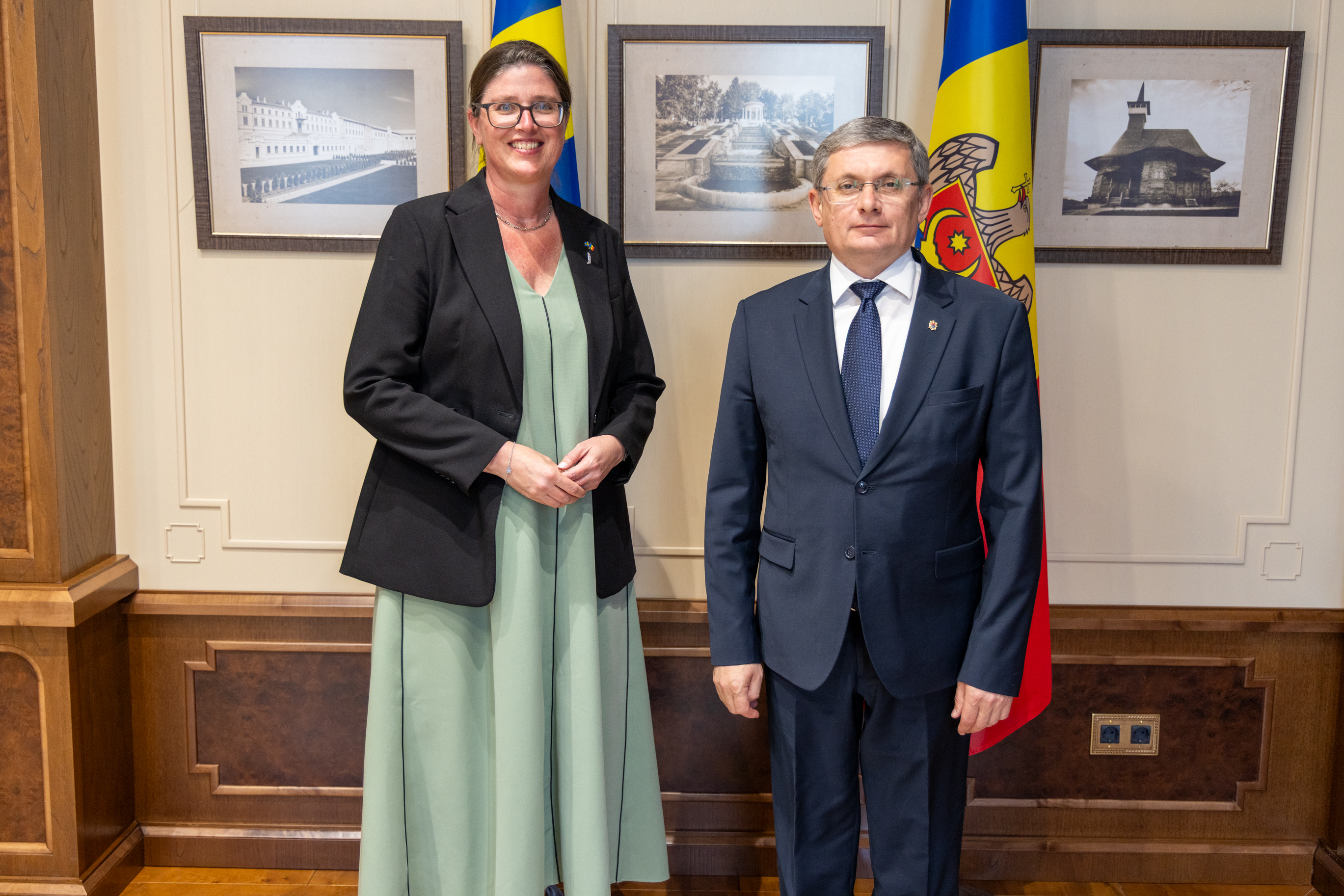
Ambassador Katarina Fried (2021–2025) and President of the Moldovan Parliament Igor Grosu.

== See also ==
- Moldova–Sweden relations
