= List of ambassadors of Sweden to Yemen =

Ambassador of Sweden to Yemen
- Lesser coat of arms of the Kingdom of Sweden
- Incumbent; Petra Menander since 2022
- Ministry for Foreign Affairs; Swedish Embassy, Riyadh
- Style: His or Her Excellency (formal); Mr. or Madam Ambassador (informal)
- Reports to: Minister for Foreign Affairs
- Seat: Riyadh, Saudi Arabia (Note: The ambassador is based at the Swedish Embassy in Riyadh, Saudi Arabia.)
- Appointer: Government of Sweden
- Term length: No fixed term
- Precursor: Ambassador of Sweden to North Yemen; Ambassador of Sweden to South Yemen
- Inaugural holder: Lennart Alvin
- Formation: 1990

The Ambassador of Sweden to Yemen (known formally as the Ambassador of the Kingdom of Sweden to the Republic of Yemen) is the official representative of the government of Sweden to the government of Yemen and the president of Yemen.

== History ==
Sweden established diplomatic relations with the Yemen Arab Republic (North Yemen) and the People's Democratic Republic of Yemen (South Yemen) in December 1970 and appointed ambassadors accredited to the North Yemeni capital, Sanaa and to the South Yemeni capital, Aden.

The Yemeni unification took place on 22 May 1990, when North Yemen and South Yemen united to form the Republic of Yemen. Sweden's ambassador in Riyadh, Saudi Arabia, Lennart Alvin, who had been accredited as Swedish ambassador to North Yemen since 1987, was now accredited to the new republic.

Since 1990, Sweden's ambassador to Saudi Arabia has been accredited to Yemen's capital, Sanaa, except during the years 1999–2003, when Sweden's ambassador to Yemen was based in Cairo, Egypt.

== List of representatives ==
Name	Period	Title	Notes	Ref
Lennart Alvin	1990 (Note: Ambassador to North Yemen from 1987.)–1991	Ambassador	Resident in Riyadh.	
Steen Hohwü-Christensen	1991–1996	Ambassador	Resident in Riyadh.	
Lave Johnsson	1996–1999 (Note: In the 2000 edition of the Sveriges statskalender, Lave Johnsson is listed as ambassador to Yemen. The 2003 edition lists Bengt Sparre as ambassador to Yemen from 1999.)	Ambassador	Resident in Riyadh.	
Bengt Sparre	1999–2003	Ambassador	Resident in Cairo.	
Åke Karlsson	2003–2006	Ambassador	Resident in Riyadh.	
Jan Thesleff	2006–2011	Ambassador	Resident in Riyadh.	
Dag Juhlin-Dannfelt	September 2011 – August 2016	Ambassador	Resident in Riyadh.	
Jan Knutsson	2016–2019	Ambassador	Resident in Riyadh.	
Niclas Trouvé	2019–2022	Ambassador	Resident in Riyadh.	
Petra Menander	2022–present	Ambassador	Resident in Riyadh.	

== See also ==
- List of ambassadors of Sweden to North Yemen
- List of ambassadors of Sweden to South Yemen
