= Sten Strömholm =

Swedish diplomat (1930–1997)

- Born: Sten Daniel Strömholm; 10 July 1930; Boden, Sweden
- Died: 25 March 1997 (aged 66); Kävlinge, Sweden
- Education: Högre allmänna läroverket Union College
- Alma mater: Uppsala University
- Occupation: Diplomat
- Years active: 1959–1996
- Spouse(s): Elvy Nilsson (m. 1960) Kerstin Rantzén (m. 1965) Kerstin Stenfeldt (m. 1979)
- Children: 3
- Relatives: Stig Strömholm (brother); Christer Strömholm (half-brother)

Sten Daniel Strömholm (10 July 1930 – 25 March 1997) was a Swedish diplomat. Strömholm served in various diplomatic roles, starting his career at the Ministry for Foreign Affairs in 1959. He was stationed in Brussels and Madrid, later working as first secretary in Cairo and Paris. In 1979, he became the Swedish ambassador to Beirut during the Lebanese Civil War, where he was involved in securing the release of a kidnapped Swedish citizen and assisting in the evacuation of Swedes from Baghdad. Throughout the war, Strömholm faced significant danger, with his embassy in Beirut being evacuated, but he continued to assist remaining Swedes. He later served as ambassador to Islamabad, Deputy Permanent Representative of Sweden to the United Nations, and ambassador to Budapest, before advising the Latvian government in the 1990s.

== Early life ==
Strömholm was born on 10 July 1930 in Boden, Sweden, the son of Major Fredrik Strömholm, and his wife Gerda (née Janson). He was the brother of Professor Stig Strömholm and the half-brother of photographer Christer Strömholm. In 1934, when Strömholm was four years old, his father died by suicide, reportedly due to chronic headaches caused by a riding accident many years earlier.

Strömholm completed his secondary education at Högre allmänna läroverket in Uppsala in 1949. He then studied at Union College in Schenectady, New York, from 1949 to 1950 and earned a Candidate of Law degree from Uppsala University in 1957. During his time at Uppsala University, he was a member of Uplands nation, served as president of the Uppsala Student Union, and chaired the university's International Committee.

== Career ==
Strömholm completed his court service from 1958 to 1959 before joining the Ministry for Foreign Affairs as an attaché in 1959. He was stationed in Brussels from 1960 to 1962 and in Madrid in 1962. From 1963 to 1966, he served as an administrative officer (kanslisekreterare) in the legal department of the Ministry for Foreign Affairs. He then worked as first secretary at the Swedish embassies in Cairo (1966–1971) and Paris (1971–1976). Returning to the ministry, he became deputy director (kansliråd) in the legal department from 1976 to 1978 and was later appointed deputy director-general (departementsråd) in 1978.

In 1979, Strömholm was appointed ambassador to Beirut, with additional accreditations in Damascus and Amman. He arrived in Beirut in the midst of the Lebanese Civil War. During his first year in Beirut, he was involved in securing the release of Swedish citizen Hans Ehn, who had been kidnapped by the Palestine Liberation Organization (PLO) in early January. Ehn was freed in July of that year. In late September 1980, Strömholm worked at the Swedish evacuation center in Amman, assisting in the evacuation of 250 Swedes from war-torn Baghdad, which had come under Iranian airstrikes.

In May 1982, just weeks before the outbreak of the Lebanon War, discussions arose about the possible closure of the Swedish embassy in Beirut. The TCO division at the Ministry for Foreign Affairs urged the ministry to weigh the benefits of keeping four Swedish staff members in place against the risks they faced in the city's escalating violence. An evacuation plan was in place, and embassy operations had already been scaled down to a minimum. Strömholm had been caught in crossfire multiple times. The embassy, located on the western side near the dangerous Green Line, overlooked Beirut's devastated center. Some operations had already been transferred to Amman, where Strömholm was also accredited in Jordan and Syria.

At the start of the war, the Swedish embassy in Beirut was evacuated. Strömholm and embassy secretary Marie-Elise Gunterberg monitored the conflict from the city's eastern districts. On 10 June, Strömholm sent a telex to the Ministry for Foreign Affairs reporting that columns of smoke from bomb explosions were rising over western Beirut, where the Swedish embassy was located. The ministry had given Strömholm and Gunterberg the freedom to leave Lebanon whenever they deemed it necessary, but escape routes had been cut off. That same day, the two Swedish diplomats worked from the honorary consul's office to assist the few Swedes still in Beirut. On 14 June 1982, the Siege of Beirut began. In the following days, Strömholm helped evacuate 22 women and children by ship to Cyprus.

In July 1982, he became entangled in matters concerning the "Skomakarligan," a criminal organization involved in drug smuggling and trafficking. During the pretrial detention hearing for one of the group's leaders, Salim Chaaban, Swedish investigators received threats that both Ambassador Strömholm and a Swedish UN soldier in Lebanon would be kidnapped. However, these threats were never carried out.

In 1983, Strömholm was appointed ambassador to Islamabad, with additional accreditation in Malé. He later served as Deputy Permanent Representative of Sweden to the United Nations in New York City (1985–1989) and as ambassador to Budapest (1989–1993). From 1994, he worked at the Ministry for Foreign Affairs and, between 1994 and 1996, acted as an advisor to the Latvian government in establishing their Ministry of Foreign Affairs in Riga.

== Personal life ==
On 12 December 1959, in Uppsala, Strömholm became engaged to Elvy Nilsson from Boden. Their engagement reception was held on 12 June 1960 at Ringgatan 20D in Uppsala. They married on Midsummer's Eve, 24 June 1960, at Maria Church in Stockholm. Elvy Nilsson was the daughter of Bertil Nilsson and his wife, née Johansson, from Kiruna.

On 5 January 1965, in Stockholm, Strömholm became engaged to Kerstin Rantzén, daughter of director Allan Rantzén and his wife, Meggy, née Kritz, from Stockholm. Their marriage banns were published on 14 February 1965, and they were married on 10 April 1965 at Gustaf Adolf Church in Stockholm. Their son was born on 19 January 1966 at Allmänna BB in Stockholm, and their daughter was born on 30 December 1967 at Karolinska Hospital in Stockholm.

On 17 November 1979, Strömholm married Kerstin Stenfeldt (born 1945) at the German Church in Malmö. She was the daughter of Wide and Inez Stenfeldt. Together they had one son.

== Death ==
Strömholm died on 25 March 1997 in Hög Parish, Kävlinge Municipality, Skåne County. His funeral was held on 11 April 1997 at Hög Church in Kävlinge Municipality, Scania.

== Bibliography ==
- Strömholm, Sten (1983). Varthän Libanon? [Where is Lebanon?]. Världspolitikens dagsfrågor, 0042-2754 ; 1983:5 (in Swedish). Stockholm: Utrikespolitiska inst. ISBN 9171825320. SELIBR 7616560.

Diplomatic posts
Preceded by Jean-Jacques von Dardel	Ambassador of Sweden to Lebanon; 1979–1983	Succeeded by Ingemar Stjernberg
Preceded by Jean-Jacques von Dardel	Ambassador of Sweden to Jordan; 1979–1983	Succeeded by Ingemar Stjernberg
Preceded by Jean-Jacques von Dardel	Ambassador of Sweden to Syria; 1979–1983	Succeeded by Göran Berg
Preceded by Carl-Johan Groth	Ambassador of Sweden to Pakistan; 1983–1985	Succeeded by Gunnar Hultner
Preceded by Carl-Johan Groth	Ambassador of Sweden to the Maldives; 1983–1985	Succeeded by Gunnar Hultner
Preceded by Jan Lundvik	Deputy Permanent Representative of Sweden to the United Nations; 1985–1989	Succeeded by Lars-Göran Engfeldt
Preceded by Ragnar Dromberg	Ambassador of Sweden to Hungary; 1989–1993	Succeeded by Jan Lundvik
