= Jean-Jacques von Dardel =

Swedish diplomat (1918–1989)

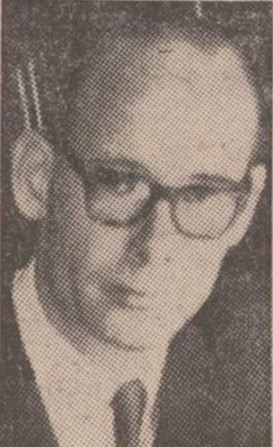
- von Dardel c. 1960s
- Born: Bengt Gustaf Jean-Jacques von Dardel; 13 October 1918; Stockholm, Sweden
- Died: 23 March 1989 (aged 70); Stockholm, Sweden
- Education: Stockholm University College
- Occupation: Diplomat
- Years active: 1944–1984
- Spouse(s): Maud Svedberg (m. 1940; died 1943) Ingrid Casselli (m. 1946)
- Children: 3
- Relatives: Fritz von Dardel (great-grandfather); Arvid Lindman (grandfather)

Bengt Gustaf Jean-Jacques von Dardel (13 October 1918 – 23 March 1989) was a Swedish diplomat. von Dardel began his diplomatic career as an attaché at the Swedish Ministry for Foreign Affairs in 1944, with postings in Brussels, London, and The Hague, among others. He served as chargé d'affaires in Budapest (1958–1962) and as counselor in Washington, D.C. (1962–1967), becoming a minister in 1965. His later assignments included ambassador roles in Algiers and Beirut, where he stayed during the early stages of the Lebanese Civil War, despite the dangerous conditions. In 1979, he became the ambassador to Brussels and Luxembourg, serving until his retirement in 1984. He then served as Marshal of the Diplomatic Corps (1985–1988) and chaired the Petra and Karl Erik Hedborg Foundation until his death in 1989.

== Early life ==
von Dardel was born on 13 October 1918 in Stockholm, Sweden, the son of ambassador Gustaf von Dardel and Eva (née Lindman). His paternal grandfather was Chamberlain Georges Albert von Dardel, and his paternal great-grandfather was the chamberlain, diarist, and illustrator Fritz von Dardel. His maternal grandfather was Prime Minister Arvid Lindman, and his maternal great-grandfather was the business leader Achates Lindman.

He passed studentexamen at Sigtunaskolan in Sigtuna on 18 May 1937 and he received a Candidate of Law degree from Stockholm University College in 1944.

== Career ==
von Dardel was appointed as an attaché at the Ministry for Foreign Affairs in 1944. He served in Brussels in 1944, at the Foreign Ministry in Stockholm in 1946, in London in 1948, in The Hague in 1949, at the Foreign Ministry again in 1951, and in Cairo in 1955. He was chargé d'affaires in Budapest from 1958 to 1962, counselor at the embassy in Washington, D.C. from 1962 to 1967, attained the rank of minister in 1965, and was deputy head of the administrative department of the Ministry for Foreign Affairs from 1967 to 1972. He served as ambassador to Algiers from 1972 to 1974, with dual accreditation in Bamako. In 1974, he was transferred to what was, at the time, the most complicated and dangerous post a Swedish ambassador could hold: Beirut, with dual accreditations in Damascus and Amman. The Lebanese Civil War began in April the following year.

In late October 1975, during the Battle of the Hotels in Beirut, foreign embassies urged evacuation due to escalating violence. Swedish ambassador von Dardel, along with two other Swedish officials, stayed in the city despite the dangerous situation. For over a week, von Dardel couldn't access the Swedish embassy, which was located near the conflict zone, so he tried to manage operations from his residence outside the combat area, even as shellfire hit his garden. While two of his colleagues were evacuated, von Dardel and his wife stayed in Beirut. In December 1975, the Swedish embassy was closed indefinitely due to increased violence. von Dardel's colleagues left for Damascus, where he was already stationed, and on 14 December, von Dardel left Beirut on the last available flight. By January 1976, he was in Damascus, waiting for a chance to return to Beirut. In August 1976, just over a week after the Tel al-Zaatar massacre, von Dardel, accompanied by embassy secretary Per Falkenström, traveled to Lebanon to retrieve two Swedish doctors who had managed to escape the refugee camp and return to Syria. von Dardel also brought back three Swedish journalists.

In 1979, he was appointed ambassador to Brussels and Luxembourg, a position his father held between 1921 and 1941. von Dardel retired in 1984. He concluded his career as Marshal of the Diplomatic Corps (Introduktör av främmande sändebud) from 1985 to 1988. From 1985 until his death in 1989, he was chairman of the Petra and Karl Erik Hedborg Foundation, a foundation aimed at honoring Queen Astrid's memory by supporting and developing relations between Sweden and Belgium.

== Personal life ==
In 1940, he married Maud Svedberg (1914–1943), the daughter of merchant Jesper Svedberg and Sigyn (née von Konow). In 1946, he married Ingrid Casselli (1920–2011), the daughter of bank director Seth Casselli and Lily (née Lorich). Children: from his first marriage, Claes (born 1941); from his second marriage, Jacqueline (born 1948) and Jean-Louis (born 1954).

== Death ==
von Dardel died on 23 March 1989 in Stockholm. The funeral service took place on 6 April 1989 in Gustaf Adolf Church in Stockholm. He was interred on 28 April 1989 at Norra begravningsplatsen in Solna.

== Awards and decorations ==
- (Iceland) Grand Knight's Cross with Star of the Order of the Falcon (5 May 1971)
- (Egypt) Officer of the Order of Merit
- (Netherlands) Officer of the Order of Orange-Nassau
- (Belgium) Knight of the Order of Leopold II (February 1947)

Diplomatic posts
Preceded by Claës König	Ambassador of Sweden to Algeria; 1972–1974	Succeeded by Harald Edelstam
Preceded by Claës König	Ambassador of Sweden to Mali; 1972–1974	Succeeded by Harald Edelstam
Preceded by Åke Jonsson	Ambassador of Sweden to Lebanon; 1974–1978	Succeeded by Sten Strömholm
Preceded by Åke Jonsson	Ambassador of Sweden to Syria; 1974–1978	Succeeded by Sten Strömholm
Preceded by Åke Jonsson	Ambassador of Sweden to Jordan; 1974–1978	Succeeded by Sten Strömholm
Preceded by Lars von Celsing	Ambassador of Sweden to Belgium; 1979–1984	Succeeded by Kaj Sundberg
Preceded by Lars von Celsing	Ambassador of Sweden to Luxembourg; 1979–1984	Succeeded by Kaj Sundberg
Preceded by Olof Landenius	Marshal of the Diplomatic Corps; 1985–1988	Succeeded by Gunnar Ljungdahl
