= Gustaf Weidel =

Swedish gymnast and diplomat

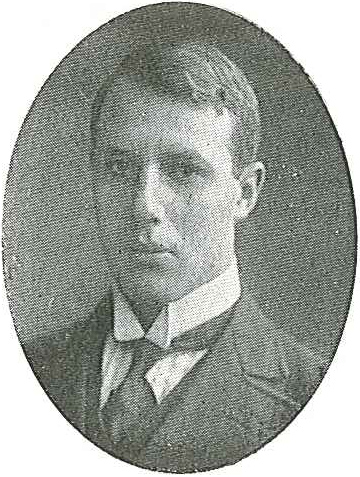
- Weidel during his time as a student at Lund University

Personal information
- Full name: Nils Gustaf Weidel
- Alternative name: Nils Gustaf Johnsson
- Born: 7 March 1890 Malmö, United Kingdoms of Sweden and Norway
- Died: 11 December 1959 (aged 69) Haverford, Pennsylvania, US

Gymnastics career
- Discipline: Men's artistic gymnastics
- Country represented: Sweden
- Club: Malmö Gymnastik- och Fäktklubb
Medal record
Men's artistic gymnastics
Representing Sweden
Olympic Games
Gold medal – first place	1908 London	Team

Nils Gustaf Weidel, né Johnsson (7 March 1890 – 11 December 1959) was a Swedish gymnast who competed in the 1908 Summer Olympics and was later a diplomat.

== Early life ==
Gustaf Weidel was born as Gustaf Johnsson on 7 March 1890 in Malmö, Sweden as the son of police sergeant (polisöverkonstapel) Nils Johnsson and his wife Kersti Jönsson. Weidel passed mogenhetsexamen in Malmö in 1909 after passing in school in both Sweden and England. As a youngster Weidel was a gymnast and was part of the Swedish team at the 1908 Summer Olympics in London, which was able to win the gold medal in the gymnastics men's team event. He was enrolled as a student at Lund University in 1909, receiving a Bachelor of Arts degree in 1910 and a Candidate of Law degree in 1914. It was during his time at the university that he changed his last name to Weidel. After this, he studied political economy in Germany and engaged in commercial activities, including working as the CEO of Continental Trading Company. During this time, he conducted an in-depth study of Sweden's trade relations with the United States, Brazil, Argentina, and Chile, as well as certain European countries such as France, England, and Spain, which he traveled through.

== Career ==
In 1921, Weidel became employed by the Swedish Ministry for Foreign Affairs as an acting vice consul. He was a commercial attaché and commercial counsellor in Washington, D.C. from 1922 to 1933. He was then consul general in New York City from 1933 to 1935 and Sweden's envoy in Rio de Janeiro from 1936 to 1943 and in Lisbon from 1943 to 1951. Weidel was envoy in Cairo, also accredited to Beirut and Damascus, from 1951 to 1955.

== Personal life ==
In 1921, Weidel married Louise Pape (1892–1979), who was born in Marietta, Ohio, United States.

== Death ==
He died on 11 December 1959 in Haverford, Pennsylvania, United States. He had been ill for an extended period under the care of Dr. F. L. Bartlett, who was the son of Mrs. Weidel from her previous marriage.

== Awards and decorations ==
- (Sweden) Commander Grand Cross of the Order of the Polar Star (6 June 1955)
- (Sweden) Knight of the Order of Vasa
- (Brazil) Grand Cross of the Order of the Southern Cross
- (Portugal) Grand Cross of the Military Order of Christ (27 May 1948)
- Grand Cross of the Order of Merit of the Republic of Hungary

Diplomatic posts
Preceded by Olof Lamm	Consul General of Sweden to New York City; 1933–1935	Succeeded by Martin Kastengren
Preceded by Johan Paues	Envoy of Sweden to Brazil; 1936–1943	Succeeded by Ragnar Kumlin
Preceded by Johan Beck-Friis	Envoy of Sweden to Portugal; 1943–1951	Succeeded by Jan Stenström as Chargé d'affaires
Preceded by Widar Bagge	Envoy of Sweden to Egypt; 1951–1955	Succeeded by Brynolf Eng
Preceded by Widar Bagge	Envoy of Sweden to Lebanon; 1951–1955	Succeeded by Brynolf Eng
Preceded by Widar Bagge	Envoy of Sweden to Syria; 1951–1955	Succeeded by Brynolf Eng
