= Peter Semneby =

Swedish diplomat

Peter Semneby (born 29 June 1959) is a Swedish diplomat who currently serves as Sweden's Special Envoy for the Conflict in Yemen.

== Biography ==
Semneby was educated at the Swedish Armed Forces Interpreter School, the Stockholm School of Economics, the University of Uppsala, the University of Stockholm and the John F. Kennedy School of Government at Harvard University. He has worked at the Swedish Ministry for Foreign Affairs since 1986 and served at the embassies in Moscow, Kyiv and Bonn. Semneby was responsible for European Security and Defence Policy in the Foreign Ministry from 1997 to 2000.

In 2000, Semneby joined the OSCE as head of its missions in Latvia (until 2002) and in Croatia (until 2005). He served as the EU's Special Representative for the South Caucasus between 2006 and 2011. Between 2011 and 2012, Semneby was a senior fellow of the German Marshall Fund of the United States.

Semneby was appointed as the Ambassador of Sweden to Afghanistan in 2012, and served in that capacity until his appointment as ambassador of Sweden to Lebanon with additional responsibility for the evacuated Swedish embassy in Damascus.

In 2017, Semneby was appointed Special Envoy of Sweden for the conflicts in Yemen and Libya. In this capacity, Semneby played a central role in the UN-led negotiations between the parties of the Yemeni civil war in December 2018, which were hosted by Sweden in the city of Rimbo. The negotiations resulted in the so-called Stockholm Agreement, through which the parties agreed to a prisoner exchange and a ceasefire in the port city of Hodeidah.

In addition to his native Swedish, Semneby speaks English, French, German and Russian.

Diplomatic posts
Preceded by Torbjörn Pettersson	Ambassador of Sweden to Afghanistan; 2012–2015	Succeeded by Anders Sjöberg
Preceded by Diana Janse	Ambassador of Sweden to Lebanon; 2015–2017	Succeeded by Jörgen Lindström
Preceded by Diana Janse	Chargé d'affaires of Sweden to Syria; 2015–2017	Succeeded by Jörgen Lindström
