= List of ambassadors of Sweden to Cyprus =

Ambassador of Sweden to Cyprus
- Lesser coat of arms of the Kingdom of Sweden

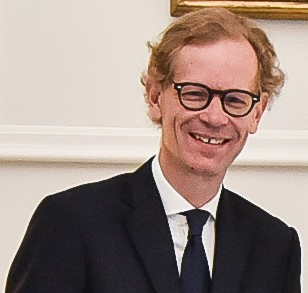
- Incumbent; Henrik Cederin since August 2026
- Ministry for Foreign Affairs; Swedish Embassy, Nicosia
- Style: His or Her Excellency (formal); Mr. or Madam Ambassador (informal)
- Reports to: Minister for Foreign Affairs
- Seat: Nicosia, Cyprus
- Appointer: Government of Sweden
- Term length: No fixed term
- Inaugural holder: Gösta Brunnström
- Formation: October 1960
- Website: Swedish Embassy, Nicosia

The Ambassador of Sweden to Cyprus (known formally as the Ambassador of the Kingdom of Sweden to the Republic of Cyprus) is the official representative of the government of Sweden to the president and government of Cyprus.

== History ==
On the occasion of Cyprus' declaration of independence on 16 August 1960, Swedish foreign minister Östen Undén sent a congratulatory telegram to Cypriot foreign minister Nikos Kranidiotis, stating that the Swedish government recognized Cyprus as a sovereign and independent state. He expressed his hope for friendly and cordial relations between the two countries. At the same time, congratulatory telegrams were also sent to Cyprus' President, Archbishop Makarios III, by King Gustaf VI Adolf.

In October 1960, Sweden and Cyprus reached an agreement to establish diplomatic relations. In connection with this, Sweden's ambassador in Beirut, Gösta Brunnström, was appointed to also serve as ambassador to Nicosia.

On 20 April 1964, the new Swedish embassy in Nicosia began its operations under the leadership of the Swedish ambassador in Beirut, Gösta Brunnström. Based in Lebanon, Brunnström had previously been responsible for Cyprus, but Sweden had not yet had a permanent diplomatic presence on the island. When Swedish UN troops were sent to Cyprus, as part of the United Nations Peacekeeping Force in Cyprus (UNFICYP), such a representation in Nicosia was deemed necessary. The new embassy was to be headed by Göran Bundy as chargé d'affaires. The temporary embassy was closed in 1965.

The ambassador was concurrently accredited from Beirut (1960–1974), Cairo (1976–1981), and Tel Aviv (1981–2002). In November 2003, the Swedish government appointed Ingemar Lindahl as ambassador to Nicosia, making him the first Swedish ambassador whose sole responsibility was Cyprus. Initially, he was based in Stockholm. In 2004, Sweden opened an embassy in Cyprus.

== List of representatives ==
Name	Period	Title	Resident / Concurrent accreditation	Notes	Presented credentials	Ref
Gösta Brunnström	October 1960 – 1965	Ambassador	Resident in Beirut			
Göran Bundy	1964–1965	Chargé d'affaires ad interim (Note: With diplomatic rank of embassy counselor.)				
Claës Ivar Wollin	1965–1969	Ambassador	Resident in Beirut			
Åke Jonsson	1969–1974	Ambassador	Resident in Beirut			
–	1975–1975	Ambassador		Vacant		
Axel Edelstam	1976–1981	Ambassador	Resident in Cairo			
Torsten Örn	1981–1983	Ambassador	Resident in Tel Aviv			
Sven Hirdman	1983–1987	Ambassador	Resident in Tel Aviv			
Mats Bergquist	1987–1992	Ambassador	Resident in Tel Aviv			
Carl-Magnus Hyltenius	1992–1996	Ambassador	Resident in Tel Aviv			
John Hagard	1996–1999	Ambassador	Resident in Tel Aviv			
Anders Lidén	1999–2002	Ambassador	Resident in Tel Aviv			
Ingemar Lindahl	2003–2004	Ambassador	Resident in Stockholm			
Ingemar Lindahl	2004–2012	Ambassador				
Klas Gierow	2012–2016	Ambassador			10 January 2012	
Anna Olsson Vrang	1 September 2016 – 2019	Ambassador			3 October 2016	
Anders Hagelberg	1 September 2019 – 2022	Ambassador			20 September 2019	
Martin Hagström	1 September 2022 – 2026	Ambassador			30 November 2022	
Henrik Cederin	August 2026 – present	Ambassador			9 September 2026	

== See also ==
- Cyprus–Sweden relations
