= Ingemar Stjernberg =

Swedish diplomat (1933–2025)

- Born: Elis Ingemar Stjernberg; 12 April 1933; Bollnäs, Sweden
- Died: 23 December 2025 (aged 92); Stockholm, Sweden
- Education: Uppsala högre allmänna läroverk
- Alma mater: Uppsala University
- Occupation: Diplomat
- Years active: 1962–1998
- Spouse: Margit Öhman (m. 1959)

Elis Ingemar Stjernberg (12 April 1933 – 23 December 2025) was a Swedish diplomat. Stjernberg began his career as an attaché at the Ministry for Foreign Affairs in 1962 and held several key diplomatic positions, including second secretary at the Swedish UN mission in New York City and first secretary in London. In 1982, he was appointed ambassador to Beirut and later to Amman, arriving in Lebanon during the volatile aftermath of the 1982 Lebanon War. Throughout the Lebanese Civil War, he coordinated the evacuation of Swedish citizens and remained involved in negotiations during the Lebanon hostage crisis. In 1990, Stjernberg was appointed envoy to Pretoria, where he became ambassador following the release of Nelson Mandela. From 1994 to 1998, he held significant roles within the Ministry for Foreign Affairs, overseeing relations with OSCE member states and coordinating EU-related technical assistance to candidate countries.

== Early life ==
Stjernberg was born on 12 April 1933 in Bollnäs, Sweden, the son of Elis Stjernberg and his wife Hildur (née Tranfelt). He passed studentexamen at Uppsala högre allmänna läroverk in May 1953. Stjernberg received a Candidate of Law degree from Uppsala University in 1959.

== Career ==
Stjernberg completed his judicial clerkship from 1959 to 1962 before being employed as an attaché at the Ministry for Foreign Affairs in Stockholm in 1962. He served as second secretary at the Swedish UN mission in New York City in 1963, as first secretary in London in 1965, and as a desk officer (departementssekreterare) at the Ministry for Foreign Affairs in 1968. Stjernberg was first secretary at the embassy in East Berlin in 1973, embassy counselor at the EC delegation in Brussels in 1976, and became deputy director (kansliråd) at the Ministry for Foreign Affairs in 1979. He served as head of the Office of the State Secretary for Foreign Affairs (kabinettssekreterarens kansli) when, in November 1982, he was appointed ambassador to Beirut. In January 1983, he was also appointed ambassador to Amman. Stjernberg arrived in Lebanon during a turbulent time, a year after the start of the 1982 Lebanon War.

At the beginning of February 1984, the Swedish embassy in Beirut was preparing for the evacuation of the Swedes in the city. At that time, there were just over ten people. On 11 February, three Swedes traveled from Beirut to Cyprus via the port city of Jounieh, north of Beirut, according to the Ministry for Foreign Affairs. This left only about twenty Swedes remaining in Beirut. At the embassy, only the official Mait Kawas was present. She had determined through a round of calls that those who remained wanted to continue doing so and did not currently need assistance from the embassy. Therefore, Stjernberg stayed in Damascus to monitor the situation from there. On 10 February 1984, 14 Swedes arrived in Cyprus from Beirut with the help of the embassy.

During the Lebanese Civil War in November 1985, it was announced that the Swedish embassy in Beirut would be temporarily closed until the situation stabilized. Stjernberg was officially the ambassador to Lebanon but had been stationed in Stockholm since New Year's Eve 1985. From 1987, he served as consul general in West Berlin but remained accredited as ambassador to Beirut. During Stjernberg's latest visit to Beirut in April 1987, he attempted to ascertain how many Swedes were in the country. On 5 February 1988, during the Lebanon hostage crisis, two Scandinavians working for UNRWA, the Swede Jan Stening and the Norwegian William Jørgensen, were kidnapped. Stjernberg was put on standby to travel to Beirut and negotiate with the kidnappers. They were released on 1 March.

In April 1989, Stjernberg reported on the situation at the Swedish embassy in Beirut following a visit to the city. The kitchen in the residence had been badly damaged by grenades, and the copying room in the chancery was filled with bullet holes. In 1990, Stjernberg was appointed envoy in Pretoria. On 1 November 1993, after Nelson Mandela was released from prison, the Swedish legation in Pretoria was upgraded to an embassy, as one of the last legations in the world. Stjernberg's diplomatic rank was thereafter changed to ambassador instead of envoy extraordinary and minister plenipotentiary.

From 1994 to 1996, Stjernberg was ambassador at the First Unit (Pol 1): Bilateral and multilateral relations with OSCE member states at the Political Department (UD/POL) at the Ministry for Foreign Affairs, and from 1996 to 1998, ambassador at the Central and Eastern Europe Unit (EC) at the Ministry for Foreign Affairs. He was also chairman of the Council of the Baltic Sea States' committee of officials from 1995 to 1996 and coordinator for Sweden's EU-related technical assistance to EU candidate countries from 1996 to 1998.

== Personal life ==
In 1959, Stjernberg married Margit Öhman (born 1936), the daughter of Bertil Öhman and Ida (née Wennberg).

Throughout his life, he had a strong interest in his old hometown, partly through his love for the art of his old friend, the artist Mårten Andersson.

== Death ==
Stjernberg died on 23 December 2025 in Stockholm, Sweden.

Diplomatic posts
Preceded by Sten Strömholm	Ambassador of Sweden to Lebanon; 1983–1990	Succeeded by Rolf Gauffin
Preceded by Sten Strömholm	Ambassador of Sweden to Jordan; 1983–1986	Succeeded by Lars Lönnback
Preceded by Dietrich Winter	Consul General of Sweden to Berlin; 1987–1990	Succeeded by Jan Lundvik
Preceded by Jan Lundvik	Envoy/Ambassador of Sweden to South Africa; 1990–1994	Succeeded by Bo Heinebäck
