= Claës Ivar Wollin =

Swedish diplomat (1918–1999)

- Wollin c. 1960s
- Born: Claës Ivar Hjalmar Edmund Wollin; 8 October 1918; Karlskrona, Sweden
- Died: 16 July 1999 (aged 80); Stockholm, Sweden
- Education: Stockholm University College
- Occupation: Diplomat
- Years active: 1943–1984
- Spouse: Christina Gyllenswärd (m. 1943)
- Children: 3

Claës Ivar Hjalmar Edmund Wollin (8 October 1918 – 16 July 1999) was a Swedish diplomat. Wollin joined the Ministry for Foreign Affairs in 1943. He held diplomatic postings in Helsinki, Copenhagen, and at Sweden's permanent delegation to the United Nations in New York City. Over the years, he served in key roles, including first embassy secretary in Paris and Prague, counsellor in Copenhagen, and director at the Ministry for Foreign Affairs. He later became ambassador to multiple countries, including Lebanon, Poland, Austria, and Denmark.

== Early life ==
Wollin was born on 8 October 1918 in Karlskrona, Sweden, the son of Captain Ivar Wollin, and his wife Florence (née Hill). He completed his studentexamen in Stockholm in 1936 and earned a Candidate of Law degree from Stockholm University College in 1942.

== Career ==
Wollin began his career as an amanuensis at the Royal Swedish Army Materiel Administration and the Royal Swedish Naval Materiel Administration. In 1943, he joined the Ministry for Foreign Affairs as an attaché, serving in Helsinki in 1944 and Copenhagen in 1946. From 1948 to 1951, he was posted to Sweden's permanent delegation to the United Nations in New York City. After returning to the Ministry for Foreign Affairs in 1951, he was appointed first secretary in 1953.

He served as first embassy secretary in Paris from 1955 to 1957 and in Prague from 1957 to 1960. In 1960, he became counsellor at the embassy in Copenhagen, followed by a role as director (byråchef) at the Ministry for Foreign Affairs from 1961 to 1965. In 1965, he was appointed director-general for trade policy (utrikesråd) and later that year became ambassador to Beirut, with concurrent accreditation to Amman, Damascus, Jeddah, and Nicosia.

Wollin subsequently served as Sweden's ambassador to Warsaw (1969–1976), Vienna (1976–1981), and Copenhagen (1981–1984).

== Personal life ==
In 1943, Wollin married Christina Gyllenswärd (1920–2019), daughter of Ragnar Gyllenswärd, President of the Supreme Court of Sweden, and Countess Anna (née Posse). They had three children: Wiveka (born 1944), Cissela (born 1946), and Christian (born 1951).

== Death ==
Wollin died on 16 July 1999 in Oscar Parish, Stockholm. The funeral was held at Solna Church.

== Awards and decorations ==
- (Sweden) Commander of the Order of the Polar Star (18 November 1971)
- (Denmark) Commander of the Order of the Dannebrog
- Knight of the Order of the White Rose of Finland
- (France) Knight of the Legion of Honour
- (Hungary) Knight of the Hungarian Order of Merit
- (Lebanon) National Order of the Cedar (September 1969)

Diplomatic posts
Preceded by Gösta Brunnström	Ambassador of Sweden to Lebanon; 1965–1969	Succeeded by Åke Jonsson
Preceded by Gösta Brunnström	Ambassador of Sweden to Cyprus; 1965–1969	Succeeded by Åke Jonsson
Preceded by Gösta Brunnström	Ambassador of Sweden to Jordan; 1965–1969	Succeeded by Åke Jonsson
Preceded by Gösta Brunnström	Ambassador of Sweden to Saudi Arabia; 1965–1969	Succeeded by Åke Jonsson
Preceded by Gösta Brunnström	Ambassador of Sweden to Syria; 1965–1969	Succeeded by Åke Jonsson
Preceded by Erik Kronvall	Ambassador of Sweden to Poland; 1969–1976	Succeeded by Carl Johan Rappe
Preceded by Lennart Petri	Ambassador of Sweden to Austria; 1976–1981	Succeeded by Dag Malm
Preceded by Carl Swartz	Ambassador of Sweden to Denmark; 1981–1984	Succeeded by Carl De Geer
