= Hungary–Sweden relations =

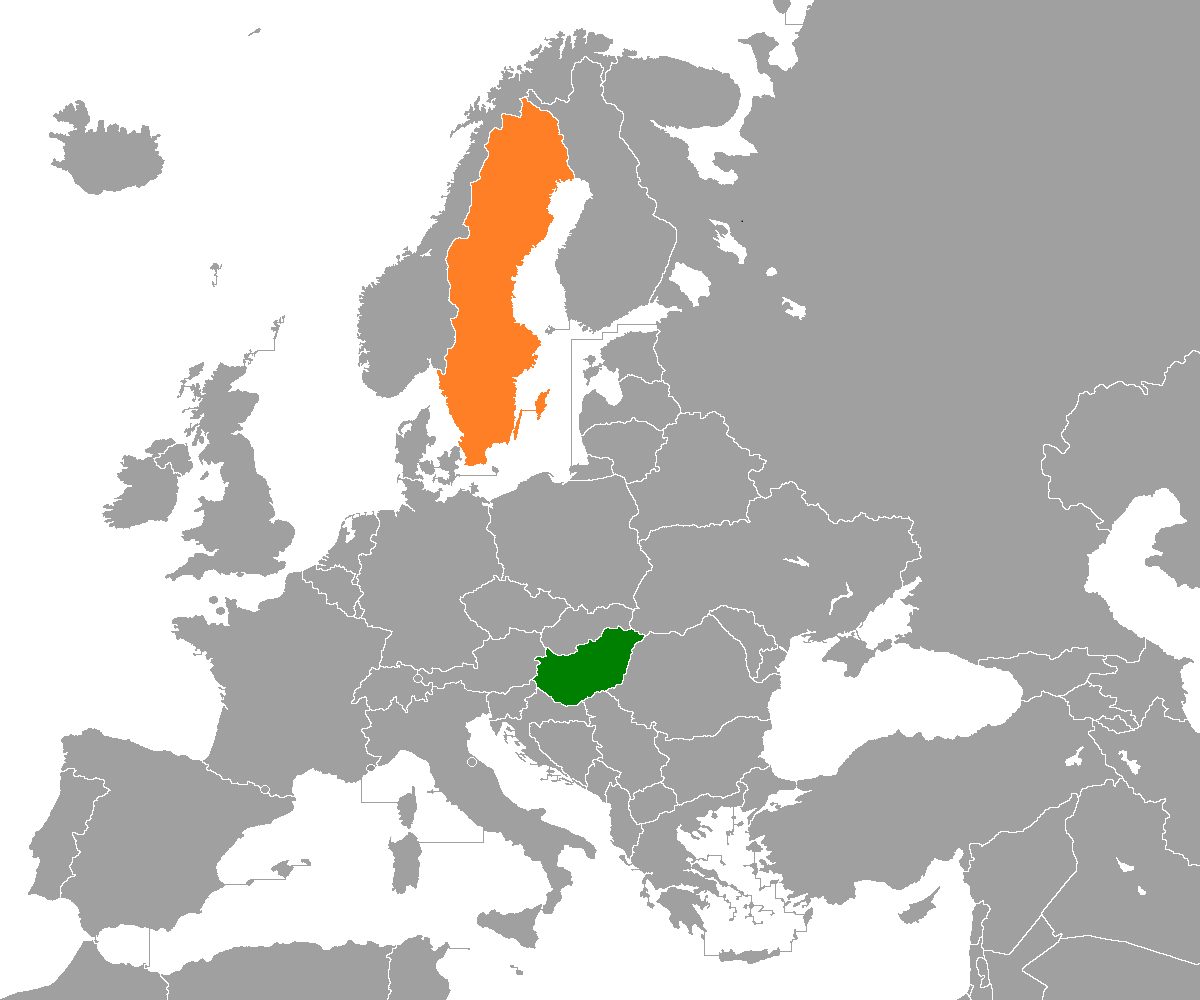

- Hungary: Sweden

Diplomatic mission
- Embassy of Hungary, Stockholm: Embassy of Sweden, Budapest

Hungary–Sweden relations are foreign relations between Hungary and Sweden. Sweden has an embassy in Budapest, and in Stockholm there is a Hungarian embassy. Diplomatic relations between the two countries started on 28 December 1945. These relations developed to a higher ambassador level. Both countries are members of the Council of Europe, European Union, NATO and Organization for Security and Co-operation in Europe.

== History ==
Between July and December 1944, from the Swedish Legation in Budapest, Raoul Wallenberg housed Jewish people and issued many protective passports, saving tens of thousands of Jewish lives in Hungary.

=== Formal diplomatic relations ===
On 12 November 1920, Swedish Foreign Minister Count Herman Wrangel informed the Hungarian government of King in Council's decision to resume official relations with Hungary. In a response telegram to Wrangel, the Hungarian Foreign Minister expressed the Hungarian government's heartfelt gratitude for this and highlighted the role of the Swedish Red Cross and other Swedish aid organizations in supporting Hungary, which had prompted this action. On 16 February 1921, Minister Oskar Ewerlöf presented his credentials to Miklós Horthy, the Regent of Hungary. The Hungarian press unanimously expressed satisfaction at the resumption of diplomatic relations between Sweden and Hungary, and particularly praised the warm-hearted work of Save the Children, as well as the initiative by Sweden and Denmark for the swift repatriation of Hungarian prisoners of war.

Both nations maintain ambassador level embassies in each other's capitals, Budapest and Stockholm.

The King of Sweden visited in October 1996. Björn von Sydow, who was the Swedish defence minister in Göran Persson's government between 1997 and 2002 took a formal visit in Budapest in 1996.

Anna Lindh, the Swedish Minister for Foreign Affairs, was murdered in Stockholm, and the Hungarian Minister for Foreign Affairs honored her with a memorial on 28 May 2004 in Budapest's City Park.

== International agreements and organisations ==
After the revolutions of 1989 and the fall of the Soviet Union in 1991, Hungary and Sweden saw fit to join several of the same intergovernmental organisations.

=== Council of Europe ===
Sweden was a founding member of Council of Europe on 5 May 1949. Hungary joined on 6 November 1990.

=== European Union ===
Sweden joined the European Union on 1 January 1995, alongside Austria and Finland, while Hungary joined the EU on 1 May 2004 alongside 9 other (mostly former Soviet & Soviet satellite) states.

=== North Atlantic Treaty Organization ===
Hungary joined NATO alongside the Czech Republic and Poland on 12 March 1999 in the fourth enlargement of NATO.

Sweden, along with Finland, applied to join NATO on 17 May 2022, and the two countries were formally invited to join the alliance when the accession protocols were signed on 5 July. This started the ratification process in which all 30 current members must approve any applicant if they are to become a member. 28 member states had ratified the Swedish application by 28 September 2022, the confirmations of which were formally registered by 14 October. The last two holdouts were Hungary and Turkey.

The Hungarian government submitted the relevant documents to the National Assembly in July, but the latter declined to process the request before it was prorogued for the year. In October, the Finnish President along with Finnish and Swedish media speculated that Hungary was delaying their approval of the Nordic applications in order to maintain political leverage on EU matters, though they regarded Turkey's approval as a more significant obstacle. Turkey approved Sweden's admission in January 2024. The Prime Minister, Viktor Orbán, stated in November that he expected parliament to ratify Swedish accession when they reconvene in mid-February. Instead the ratification vote was postponed several times by the Hungarian parliament. On the 29th of March, 2023, the spokesman for Orbán, Zoltán Kovács, wrote on his blog a list of grievances that needed to be addressed before Sweden’s admission could be ratified. Hungary's parliament voted to support Sweden's admission on February 26, 2024.

== Military relations ==
Both Hungary and Sweden have been aligned with NATO in the post-Cold War era. Hungary joined NATO in 1999, and Sweden joined in 2024.

=== Saab JAS 39 Gripen ===
Shortly after Hungary joined NATO in 1999, a push was made to replace the Air Force's MiG-29 fleet with a NATO-compatible fighter force. By 2001, several offers had been received, including a Swedish offer of 24 JAS 39 C/D's, and a US offer of 24 used F-16's. Despite the fact that the professional committees favored the F-16, on 10 September 2001, the Swedish bid won. On 20 December 2001, Hungary signed a contract with the Swedish Government in order to lease 14 JAS 39 Gripens, for 12 years beginning in 2006. By December 2007 all 14 jets had been delivered.

In 2012, Hungary decided to extend the lease until March 2026. The aircraft were upgraded in 2017 and 2022. After the lease period expires, Hungary will own the remaining Gripens.

== Resident diplomatic missions ==
- Hungary has an embassy in Stockholm.
- Sweden has an embassy in Budapest.
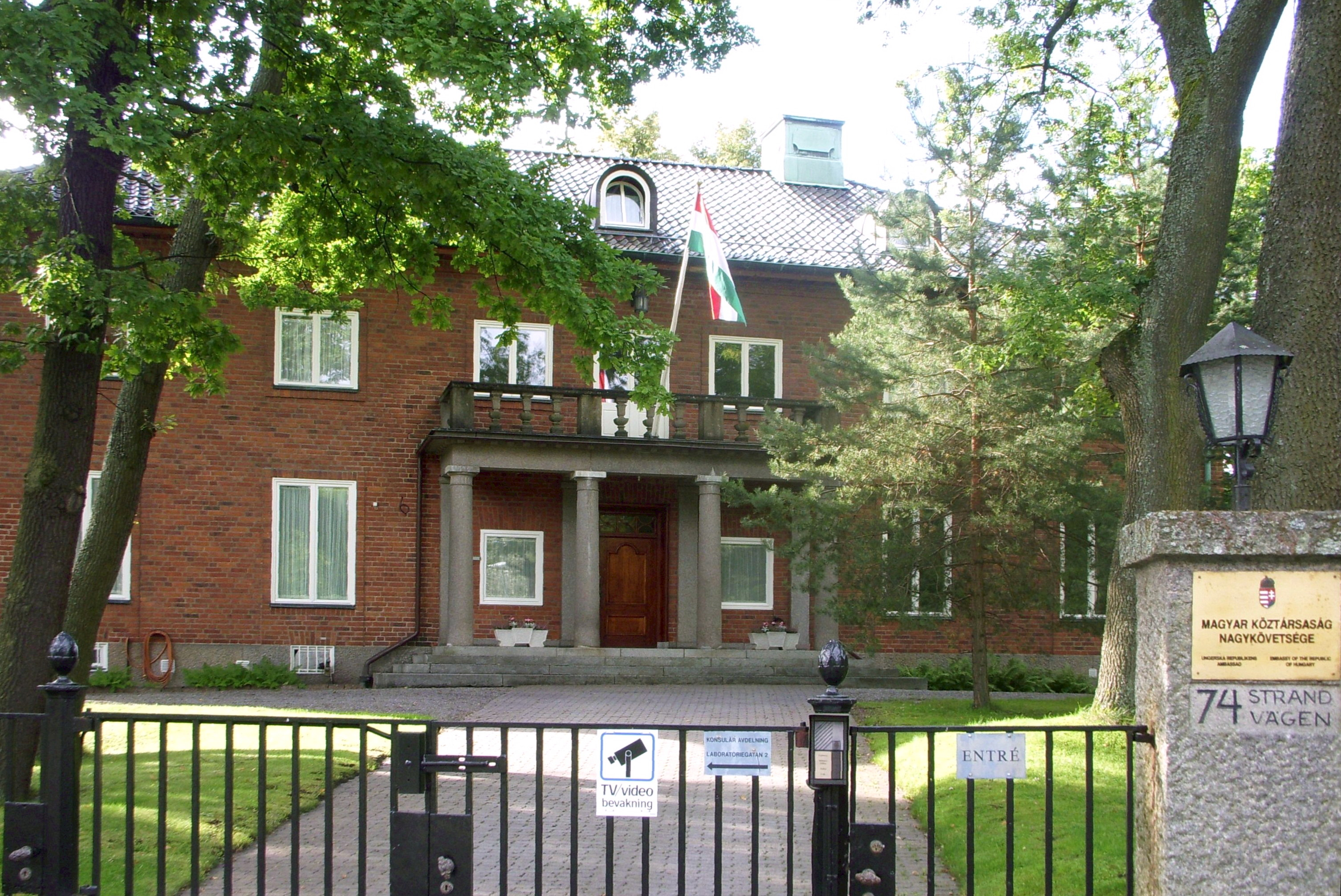
Embassy of Hungary in Stockholm

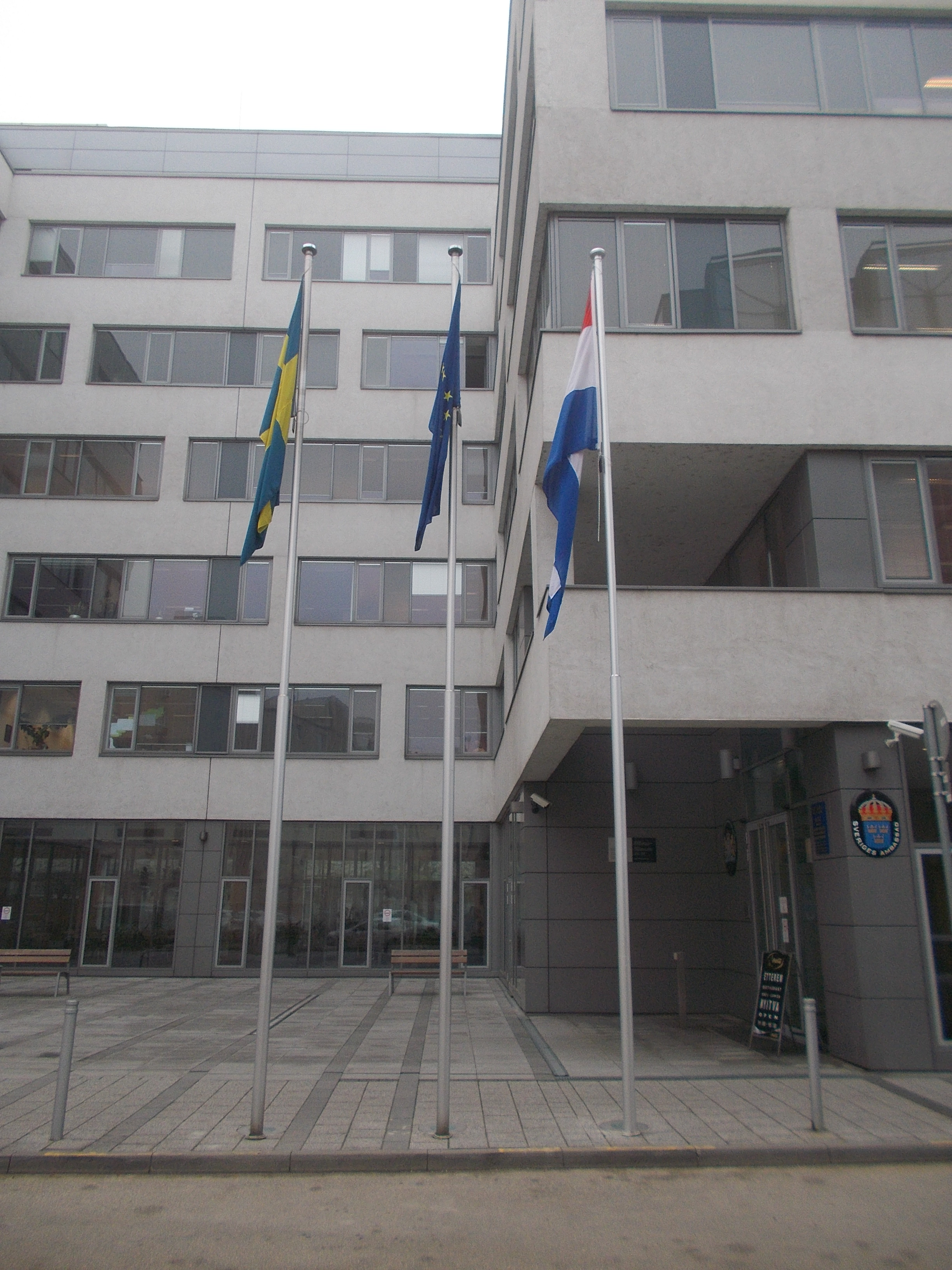
Embassy of Sweden in Budapest

== See also ==
- Foreign relations of Hungary
- Foreign relations of Sweden
- Hungarian diaspora
