= List of ambassadors of Sweden to Egypt =

Ambassador of Sweden to Egypt
- Lesser coat of arms of the Kingdom of Sweden
- Incumbent; Dag Juhlin-Dannfelt since January 2025
- Ministry for Foreign Affairs; Swedish Embassy, Cairo
- Style: His or Her Excellency (formal); Mr. or Madam Ambassador (informal)
- Reports to: Minister for Foreign Affairs
- Residence: 13 Mohamed Mazhar Street (Note: The ambassador's residence is at the same location as the chancery.)
- Seat: Cairo, Egypt
- Appointer: Government of Sweden
- Term length: No fixed term
- Formation: 1922
- First holder: Harald Bildt
- Website: Swedish Embassy, Cairo

The Ambassador of Sweden to Egypt (known formally as the Ambassador of the Kingdom of Sweden to the Arab Republic of Egypt) is the official representative of the government of Sweden to the president of Egypt and government of Egypt.

== History ==
When Egypt was recognized as an independent kingdom by the United Kingdom in 1922, Legation Councillor Harald Bildt was appointed Consul General and became Sweden's first minister in Cairo. Until then, Sweden had been represented in Egypt by a consulate general and diplomatic agents.

The Swedish envoy/ambassador in Cairo has, over the years, been accredited to several neighboring countries. In October 1945, Swedish Minister Widar Bagge in Cairo was also accredited to Addis Ababa, Ethiopia. On 7 February 1947, Minister Bagge was appointed envoy to both Beirut and Damascus. Sweden's minister in Cairo remained accredited in these countries until 1957, when the Swedish legation in Beirut opened and the Swedish minister there assumed that role. Other countries where the Swedish ambassador in Cairo has been concurrently accredited include Saudi Arabia (1957–1960), Yemen (1961–1962), Somalia (1965–1970), Cyprus (1976–1981), and Sudan (1967–2004).

In August 1957, an agreement was reached between the Swedish and Egypt governments on the mutual elevation of the respective countries' legations to embassies. The diplomatic rank was thereafter changed to ambassador instead of envoy extraordinary and minister plenipotentiary. Brynolf Eng, the envoy there, was appointed as Sweden's ambassador to Cairo.

On 22 February 1958, Sweden recognized the newly formed state of the United Arab Republic. On the same day, Sweden's envoy in Cairo, Ambassador Brynolf Eng, presented the notification and his credentials as Swedish ambassador to the United Arab Republic.

== List of representatives ==
Name	Period	Title	Resident / Concurrent accreditation	Notes	Presented credentials	Ref
Khedivate of Egypt (1867–1914)
Carlo Landberg	1888–1893	Diplomatic agent		Also consul general in Alexandria as well as diplomatic agent in Egypt		
Carl-Axel Wachtmeister	27 March 1908 – 1914	Diplomatic agent		Also consul general in Alexandria as well as diplomatic agent in Egypt. Consular judge there on 1 January 1910		
Sultanate of Egypt (1914–1922)
Carl-Axel Wachtmeister	1914 – 12 March 1918	Diplomatic agent		Also consul general in Alexandria as well as diplomatic agent in Egypt		
Carl-Axel Wachtmeister	12 March 1918 – 11 July 1919	Resident minister		Also consul general in Alexandria as well as resident minister in Egypt		
Wiktor Unander	1919–1922	Acting diplomatic agent		Also consul general in Cairo		
Kingdom of Egypt (1922–1953)
Harald Bildt	14 July 1922 – 1936	Envoy extraordinary and minister plenipotentiary		Also consul general in Cairo		
Olof Carlander	23 May 1931 – 1931	Chargé d'affaires		Also acting consul general. During Harald Bildt's leave		
Olof Carlander	28 June 1932 – 1932	Chargé d'affaires		Also acting consul general. During Harald Bildt's leave		
Knut Richard Thyberg	1936–1938	Chargé d'affaires ad interim				
Ivan Danielsson	1 July 1937 – 1942	Envoy				
Arvid Hugo Berns	1942–1945	First legation secretary and chargé d'affaires				
Widar Bagge	1945–1951	Envoy	Also accredited to Ethiopia (1945–1950), Lebanon (1947–1951), and Syria (1947–1951)			
Gustaf Weidel	1951–1953	Envoy	Also accredited to Lebanon and Syria			
Republic of Egypt (1953–1958)
Gustaf Weidel	1953–1955	Envoy	Also accredited to Lebanon and Syria			
Brynolf Eng	1955–1957	Envoy	Also accredited to Lebanon and Syria			
Brynolf Eng	1957–1958	Ambassador	Also accredited to Saudi Arabia (1957–1960) and Yemen (1961)			
United Arab Republic (1958–1971)
Brynolf Eng	1958–1961	Ambassador	Also accredited to Saudi Arabia (1957–1960) and Yemen (1961)		22 February 1958	
Sven Dahlman	1961–1962	Ambassador	Also accredited to Yemen			
Adolf Croneborg	1962–1966	Ambassador	Also accredited to Somalia (1964–1966)			
Tord Hagen	1966–1971	Ambassador	Also accredited to Somalia (1967–1970) and Sudan (1967–1972)			
Arab Republic of Egypt (1971–present)
Tord Hagen	1971–1972	Ambassador	Also accredited to Sudan (1967–1972)			
Lars von Celsing	1972–1976	Ambassador	Also accredited to Sudan			
Axel Edelstam	1976–1981	Ambassador	Also accredited to Cyprus (1976–1981), Sudan (1976–1981), and Somalia (1980–1981)			
Olov Ternström	1981–1986	Ambassador	Also accredited to Sudan			
Lars-Olof Brilioth	1987–1990	Ambassador	Also accredited to Sudan			
Jan Ståhl	1990–1995	Ambassador	Also accredited to Sudan			
Christer Sylvén	1995–2000	Ambassador	Also accredited to Sudan			
Sven Linder	2000–2003	Ambassador	Also accredited to Sudan			
Stig Elvemar	2003–2008	Ambassador	Also accredited to Sudan (until 2004 (Note: There is uncertainty about who was accredited ambassador to Khartoum during these years. According to Sveriges statskalender (2005), the Swedish ambassador in Addis Ababa, Håkan Åkesson, served as ambassador to Khartoum starting in 2002. However, Sveriges statskalender (2004) states that the Swedish ambassador to Cairo, Stig Elvemar, who was appointed in 2003, was accredited to Khartoum. That same edition also mentions that Håkan Åkesson was accredited to Khartoum from 2002. In Sveriges statskalender (2003), it is noted that the Swedish ambassador to Cairo, Sven Linder, was also accredited to Khartoum. In the same edition, it is stated that Håkan Åkesson only held a dual accreditation to Djibouti from 2002 and not to Khartoum.))			
Malin Kärre	2008–2013	Ambassador				
Charlotta Sparre	2013–2017	Ambassador				
Jan Thesleff	1 September 2017 – 2021	Ambassador				
Håkan Emsgård	2021–2024	Ambassador				
Dag Juhlin-Dannfelt	January 2025 – present	Ambassador				
