= Gösta Brunnström =

Swedish diplomat (1907–1989)

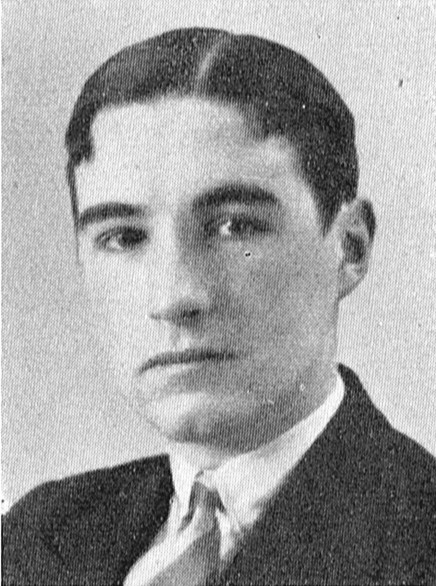
- Brunnström in his youth
- Born: Gösta Greger Stig Fabian Brunnström; 4 March 1907; Helsingborg, Sweden
- Died: 11 June 1989 (aged 82); Helsingborg, Sweden
- Education: Uppsala University
- Occupation: Diplomat
- Years active: 1936–1972
- Spouse: Mary Davis (m. 1943; died 1987)
- Children: 4

Gösta Greger Stig Fabian Brunnström (4 March 1907 – 11 June 1989) was a Swedish diplomat whose career spanned postings across several continents. After joining the Ministry for Foreign Affairs in 1936, he served in Calcutta, Paris, Oslo, Washington, D.C., Mexico City, Rio de Janeiro, and Buenos Aires before returning to Stockholm as first secretary in 1944. He later headed the Maritime Bureau (1946–48) and held senior roles in Washington and Buenos Aires again.

He was appointed ambassador to Pakistan (1956–60) and later to Lebanon (1960–65), where he was also accredited to Saudi Arabia, Jordan, Cyprus, and Syria. From 1965 he served as ambassador to Greece, but was recalled in 1967 in protest against the regime. In 1969 he became consul-general in Montreal, while formally remaining accredited as ambassador to Athens until 1972.

== Early life ==
Brunnström was born on 4 March 1907 in Helsingborg, Sweden, the son of director Fabian Brunnström and his wife Hildur (née Banck). Before graduating from secondary school in his hometown, he studied for a time in Salem and Cambridge. Brunnström was commissioned as an officer in 1929 and was lieutenant in the Scanian Cavalry Regiment (K 2) reserve from 1932 to 1946. Brunnström received a Bachelor of Arts degree in 1932 and Candidate of Law degree from Uppsala University in 1936 before he became an attaché at the Ministry for Foreign Affairs in 1936.

== Career ==
Brunnström served at the Consulate-General in Calcutta in 1937 and was acting consul-general there in 1938. He was attaché in Paris in 1939 and in Oslo in 1940, and became second secretary at the legation in Washington, D.C., in 1941. He served as chargé d’affaires ad interim in Mexico City in 1942, as legation secretary in Rio de Janeiro in 1943, and in Buenos Aires in 1944, before becoming first secretary at the Foreign Ministry in Stockholm in 1944.

From 1946 to 1948, Brunnström was Director of the Foreign Ministry’s Maritime Bureau (Utrikesdepartementets sjöfartsbyrå). He subsequently served as first secretary at the mission in Washington, D.C., in 1948, in Buenos Aires in 1949, and as director at the Foreign Ministry in 1954.

He was appointed ambassador to Karachi from 1956 to 1960, and to Beirut from 1960 to 1965, also accredited to Riyadh, Amman, and Nicosia, and simultaneously to Damascus from 1961 to 1965. From 1965 he was ambassador to Athens. In 1967, Brunnström was recalled to Stockholm “for consultations” as a protest against the Greek regime.

In September 1969, he was appointed consul-general in Montreal. At that time, the Swedish Ministry for Foreign Affairs stated that “Brunnström’s appointment did not affect his accreditation with the King of Greece, and that this accreditation formally remained unchanged.” He remained accredited as ambassador to Athens until 1972, while simultaneously serving as consul-general in Montreal.

== Personal life ==
In 1943 he married Mary Minerva Davis (1917–1987), the daughter of Allen Davis and Alice Suplee. Brunnström had four children: Ulla (1944–2002), Barbara Ann, Stig, and Ulf.

Brunnström retired in 1972 and returned to Sweden in 1983. For many years he owned the parental home Hamilton House in Helsingborg, which was purchased and exploited by the city in the 1960s.

== Death ==
Brunnström died on 11 June 1989 in Helsingborg. The funeral was held on 22 June 1989 at Allerum Church in Allerum, Skåne County. He was buried on 13 July 1989 at Pålsjö Cemetery in Helsingborg.

== Awards ==
- (Sweden) Commander of the Order of the Polar Star (17 November 1968)
- (Sweden) Knight of the Order of the Polar Star (1957)
- (Greece) Grand Cross of the Order of the Phoenix (1976)
- Commander of the Order of Merit of Argentina

Diplomatic posts
Preceded by Ragnvald Bagge	Ambassador of Sweden to Pakistan; 1956–1960	Succeeded by Hugo Ärnfast
Preceded by Åke Sjölin	Ambassador of Sweden to Lebanon; 1960–1965	Succeeded by Claës Ivar Wollin
Preceded by Brynolf Eng	Ambassador of Sweden to Saudi Arabia; 1960–1965	Succeeded by Claës Ivar Wollin
Preceded by Åke Sjölin	Ambassador of Sweden to Jordan; 1960–1965	Succeeded by Claës Ivar Wollin
Preceded by None	Ambassador of Sweden to Cyprus; 1960–1965	Succeeded by Claës Ivar Wollin
Preceded by Åke Sjölin	Ambassador of Sweden to Syria; 1961–1965	Succeeded by Claës Ivar Wollin
Preceded by Tage Grönwall	Ambassador of Sweden to Greece; 1965–1972	Succeeded by Dag Bergman
Preceded by Stig Engfeldt	Consul General of Sweden in Montreal; 1969–1972	Succeeded by Sten Aminoff
