= Embassy of Sweden, Beirut =

Diplomatic mission of Sweden in Lebanon

- Location: Beirut
- Address: Postal address Riad el Solh; P.O. Box 11-4883; Beirut; Visiting address 1347 Minet el Hosn; French Avenue (next to Beirut Souks); French Avenue Building, 6th floor Downtown, Beirut
- Coordinates: 33.90044°N 35.50283°E
- Opened: 1957
- Ambassador: Tomas Brundin
- Jurisdiction: Lebanon; Syria
- Website: Official website

The Embassy of Sweden in Beirut is Sweden's diplomatic mission in Lebanon. The Embassy of Sweden in Beirut has a complex history, reflecting the turbulent political landscape of Lebanon. Sweden recognized Lebanon as an independent state in 1945 and established diplomatic relations in 1947. The Swedish legation in Beirut was established in 1957 and was elevated to an embassy in 1960. The embassy faced multiple closures due to the Lebanese Civil War, particularly during intense conflicts like the Battle of the Hotels in 1975 and the 1982 Lebanon War. Despite temporary closures, the embassy resumed operations intermittently. It was permanently reopened in 2016, focusing on political reporting and aid, particularly in response to the Syrian civil war and its spillover in Lebanon.

== History ==
=== 1945–1982: Early Diplomatic Relations and Crisis Management ===
Sweden recognized Lebanon and Syria as independent states on 2 November 1945. Sweden and Lebanon established diplomatic relations in 1947. In the council on 7 February 1947, Sweden's minister in Cairo, Envoy Widar Bagge, was appointed as envoy to both Beirut and Damascus, while remaining stationed in Cairo. In 1957 a Swedish legation was established in Beirut. In June of the same year, Åke Sjölin was appointed as Sweden's first resident envoy there. In March 1960, an agreement was reached between the Swedish and Lebanese governments on the mutual elevation of the respective countries' legations to embassies. The diplomatic rank was thereafter changed to ambassador instead of envoy extraordinary and minister plenipotentiary. In connection with this, Sweden's newly appointed envoy to Beirut, Gösta Brunnström, was designated as ambassador. In early 1967, a permanent representation was established in Saudi Arabia's commercial center of Jeddah under the direction of a chargé d'affaires ad interim. The office was subordinated to the head of mission in Beirut, Lebanon.

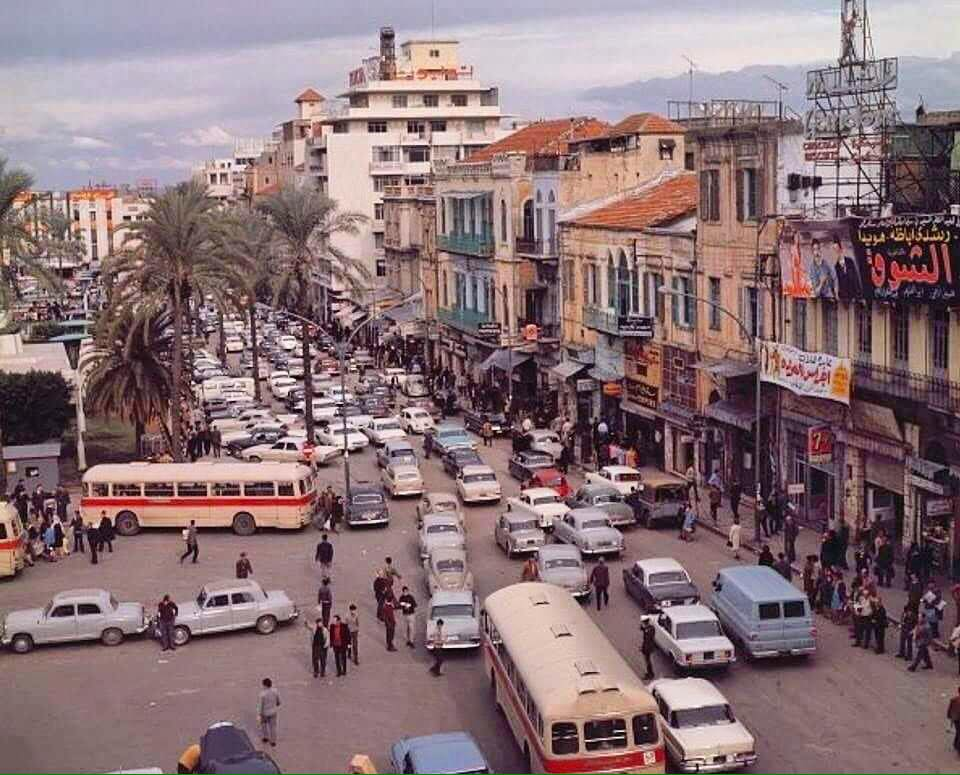
Martyrs' Square in Beirut in 1960

On 16 April 1975, three days after the start of the Lebanese Civil War, a bomb exploded outside the Swedish embassy in Beirut, shattering all the windows in the building. No Swedes were injured, according to a message from the embassy to the Swedish Ministry for Foreign Affairs. The bomb explosion was described in the report as part of the street fighting and was not directed at the embassy. At the end of October 1975, the event known as the Battle of the Hotels began. As the fighting drew closer to the residential area for foreigners, on 27 October, the Swedish, American, and British embassies urged all who could to evacuate the city. Two female Swedish embassy secretaries were to be sent home. Remaining at the embassy were Ambassador Jean-Jacques von Dardel, First Secretary of Foreign Affairs Håkan Damm, and Foreign Ministry trainee Lennart Båge.

On 29 October 1975, an SAS flight left Beirut for Sweden with 18 Swedes on board. At that time, about 30 Swedes remained in Beirut. The two Swedish embassy secretaries and a trade secretary were sent home on the SAS plane. According to the Ministry for Foreign Affairs, this was not considered a general evacuation of Swedes, but Swedes were advised to leave due to the unrest in Beirut. For over a week, neither Ambassador von Dardel nor anyone else had been able to reach the Swedish embassy, which was then located on the seventh floor of an office building on Rue Clemenceau. Von Dardel subsequently attempted to manage the work from his residence in the hills 7-8 km southeast of the combat zone. Secretary Håkan Damm and Foreign Ministry trainee Lennart Båge stayed at the Holiday Home Hotel in another part of the city. A shell had landed in Ambassador von Dardel's garden. On 5 November 1975, it was planned for Håkan Damm and Lennart Båge to return to Sweden, while Ambassador von Dardel and his wife remained in Beirut.

In mid-December 1975, the Swedish embassy in Beirut was closed indefinitely. Embassy secretary Lennart Båge and secretary Håkan Damm planned to attempt to drive to Damascus. They assessed the situation in Beirut as too dangerous to remain. The recent days of fighting had resulted in a large number of casualties. No visitors had been able to reach the Swedish embassy's premises. The embassy had only been open for about a week after previously being closed during the fighting between Christians and Muslims. On 10 December 1975, the two embassy officials managed to leave Beirut. They were to attempt to drive to Damascus, where Ambassador Jean-Jacques von Dardel was already located. The Swedish Consul General also left Beirut. After that, Lebanon was managed from the Swedish embassy in Damascus. Ambassador von Dardel left Beirut on 14 December 1975 on the last SAS flight after the fighting between Christians and Muslims had worsened. In mid-January 1976, he traveled to Damascus to await a suitable opportunity to return to Beirut.

In September 1978, State Secretary for Foreign Affairs Leif Leifland and Deputy Director General Jan af Sillén traveled to Beirut to assess the political situation in Lebanon and the working conditions at the Swedish embassy. The embassy was located in central Beirut. During the fighting, it was isolated, and telex and telephone connections with the outside world were cut off.

=== 1982–1986: The Lebanese Civil War and Embassy Closures ===
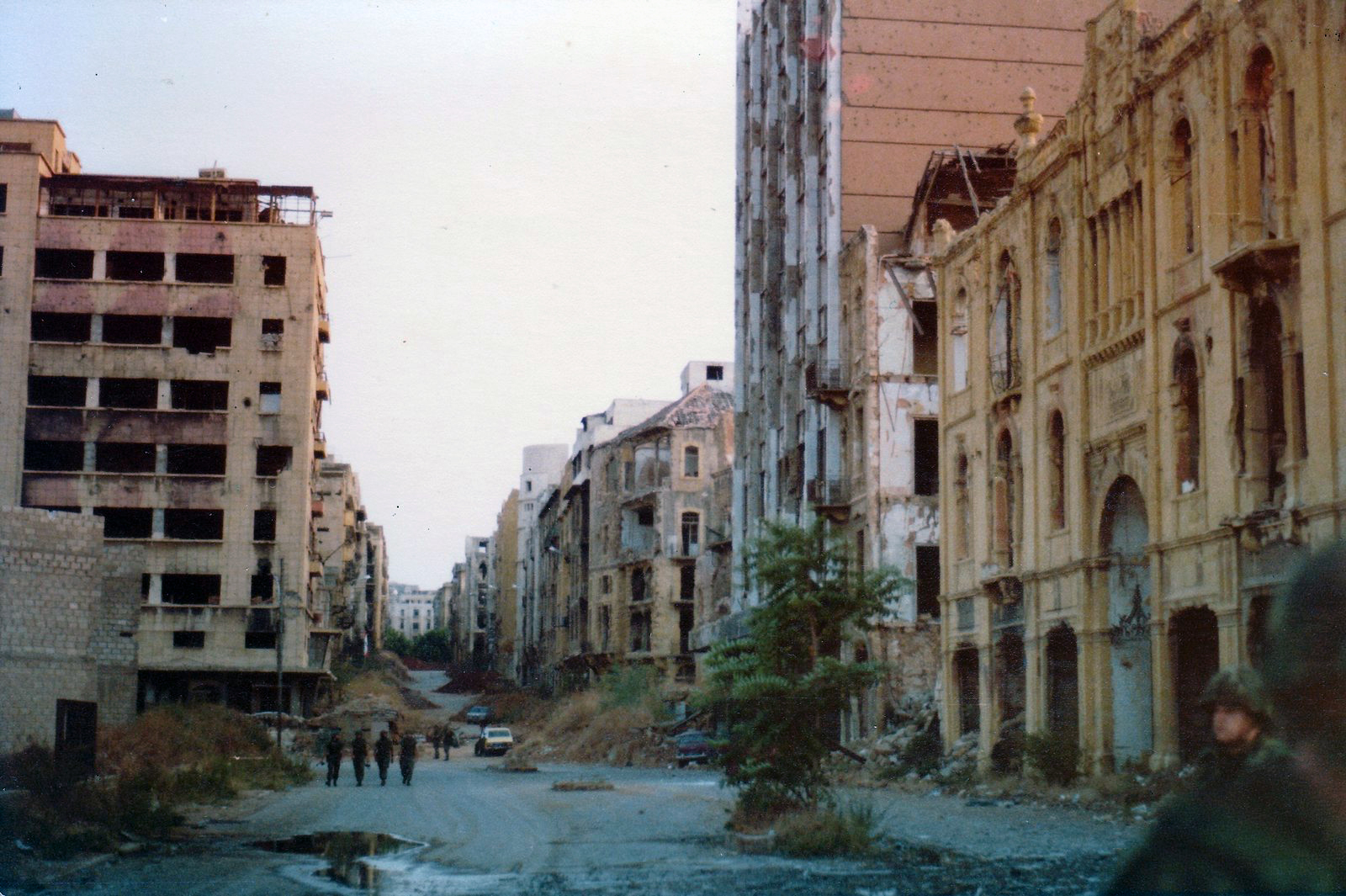
The Green Line in 1982. The embassy was then located on the west side near this line, overlooking its devastated center.

In May 1982, a few weeks before the outbreak of the 1982 Lebanon War, it was reported that Sweden's embassy in Beirut might be closed. The TCO division at the Ministry for Foreign Affairs believed that the ministry needed to consider whether the advantage of keeping the four Swedes there on duty outweighed the risk that they might fall victim to the violence in Beirut. An evacuation plan for the staff in Beirut was in place, and the staffing was already as minimal as it could be. The ambassador in Beirut, Sten Strömholm, had found himself in the line of fire several times in Beirut. The embassy was located on the western side, near the dangerous Green Line, with a view of its completely devastated center. Some of the operations had been transferred to Amman. Ambassador Strömholm was also accredited in Jordan and Syria.

The Swedish embassy in Beirut was evacuated at the beginning of the war. Ambassador Sten Strömholm and secretary Marie-Elise Gunterberg followed the fighting in Beirut from the eastern districts. On 10 June, Strömholm telex messaged the Ministry for Foreign Affairs that smoke columns from bomb explosions were rising over western Beirut. The Swedish embassy was located in the western parts of central Beirut. The Ministry for Foreign Affairs had given Strömholm and Gunterberg the freedom to leave Beirut and Lebanon whenever they deemed it necessary. However, escape routes were cut off. On 10 June, the two Swedish diplomats worked from the honorary consul's office to try to manage the situation for the few Swedes who were in Beirut. On 14 June 1982, the Siege of Beirut began.

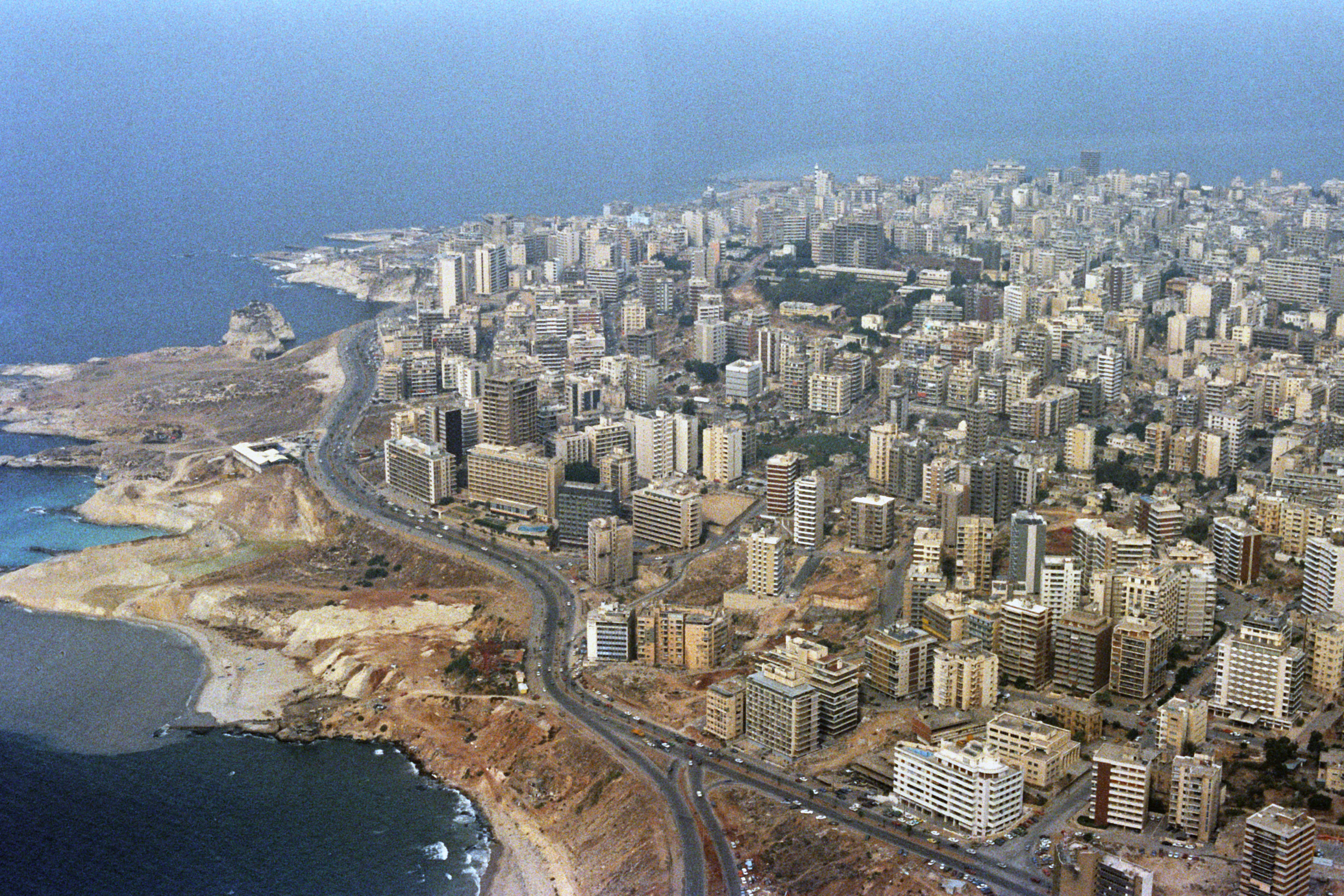
West Beirut in 1983

At the beginning of February 1984, the Swedish embassy in Beirut was preparing for the evacuation of the Swedes in the city. At that time, there were just over ten people. On 11 February, three Swedes traveled from Beirut to Cyprus via the port city of Jounieh, north of Beirut, according to the Ministry for Foreign Affairs. This left only about twenty Swedes remaining in Beirut. At the embassy, only the official Mait Kawas was present. She had determined through a round of calls that those who remained wanted to continue doing so and did not currently need assistance from the embassy. Therefore, Ambassador Ingemar Stjernberg stayed in Damascus to monitor the situation from there. On 10 February 1984, 14 Swedes arrived in Cyprus from Beirut with the help of the embassy.

The Swedish embassy in Beirut reopened on 10 September 1984, with First Embassy Secretary Lars Bjarme as chargé d'affaires ad interim and the head of mission. Eleven days later it was reported that the Swedish embassy in Beirut was under siege by Palestinians seeking visas to Sweden. The Lebanese newspaper Al Fasir had claimed that Sweden would accept 50,000 Palestinian refugees within a few years. This newspaper article was unfounded. The Ministry for Foreign Affairs denied the newspaper's claims. At that time, Sweden was already dealing with significant problems related to the illegal immigration of Palestinians to Scania. Sweden's chargé d'affaires ad interim, Lars Bjarme, could not leave the embassy as corridors, stairs, and the street outside the embassy were surrounded by prospective refugees heading to Sweden. The embassy staff did everything they could to explain to the Palestinians that they had no possibility of obtaining residence permits in Sweden. The officials had to spend all their time refuting the erroneous newspaper reports that Sweden was willing to accept 50,000 Palestinians. Posters at the embassy informed visitors about the rules for obtaining residence permits in Sweden, including the requirement of having close family ties.

A couple of weeks later, it was reported that the embassy was trying in various ways to curb the influx of Lebanese who were already en route to Sweden or planning to travel there. Rumors had portrayed Sweden as a wealthy and peaceful country where refugees were welcomed with open arms. The Swedish embassy advertised in the largest newspapers in Beirut, emphasizing that immigration to Sweden was highly restricted and that there were very strict rules for obtaining asylum. The number of visa applicants dropped from 247 to 24 within a few days. At the embassy, besides chargé d'affaires ad interim Lars Bjarme, there was a secretary and a representative from the National Swedish Immigration and Naturalization Board in Norrköping, who assisted with visa matters.

On 3 May 1985, threats against the Swedish embassy were received from the Palestinian terrorist organization Black September Organization. Surveillance of the embassy was increased, but the Swedish Ministry for Foreign Affairs reported that it was not yet necessary to recall staff. Black September had threatened to carry out actions against the Swedish embassy unless Sweden returned the Palestinians residing in Sweden by 31 May. By the end of May, a man called the embassy and introduced himself as a representative of the terrorist organization "Black September." He stated that several Swedish diplomatic missions in various countries would be targeted for terrorist attacks. The call did not include any demands from Sweden or an explanation for why the Swedish missions would be targeted, only that actions would be carried out after 1 June. The threat might have been related to the fact that a group of Palestinians was scheduled to be deported from Sweden the following week.

In November 1985, the decision was made to temporarily close the Swedish embassy in Beirut. This decision was made by the Ministry for Foreign Affairs in consultation with the three employees at the embassy. The embassy would remain closed until the situation stabilized. At that time, the Swedish embassy was located in the Muslim-dominated area of western Beirut, where intense fighting had recently been ongoing. The embassy was subsequently closed in 1986.

=== 1987–1997: Period of Intermittent Operations ===
In August 1987, it was reported that the Swedish embassy in Beirut was closed due to the unstable situation. The embassy in the neighboring country, Syria, had taken over most of the consular duties in Lebanon. Ambassador Ingemar Stjernberg was stationed in West Berlin. During his latest visit to Beirut in April of that year, he attempted to ascertain how many Swedes were in the country.

On 5 February 1988, during the Lebanon hostage crisis, two Scandinavians working for UNRWA, the Swede Jan Stening and the Norwegian William Jørgensen, were kidnapped. Sweden's accredited ambassador in Beirut, Ingemar Stjernberg, was put on standby to travel to Beirut and negotiate with the kidnappers. They were released on 1 March.

In April 1989, Sweden's accredited ambassador in Beirut, Ingemar Stjernberg, reported on the situation at the Swedish embassy in Beirut following a visit to the city. The kitchen in the residence had been badly damaged by grenades, and the copying room in the chancery was filled with bullet holes. From 1991, the Swedish ambassador in Damascus, the capital of Syria, had also been accredited in Beirut.

In August 1994, it was reported that the Swedish embassy in Beirut had been closed since the civil war, and Swedish interests in Lebanon were instead being managed by the Swedish embassy in Damascus. However, in the autumn of 1994, the embassy was reopened but with locally employed staff. On 19 September 1996, the Swedish government decided that the Swedish embassy in Beirut would be staffed again with Swedish personnel during the autumn. The first Swedish diplomat to be stationed at the embassy in Beirut that autumn was Embassy Counsellor Leif Rensfeldt.

=== 1997–2001: Renewed Diplomatic Presence and Closure ===
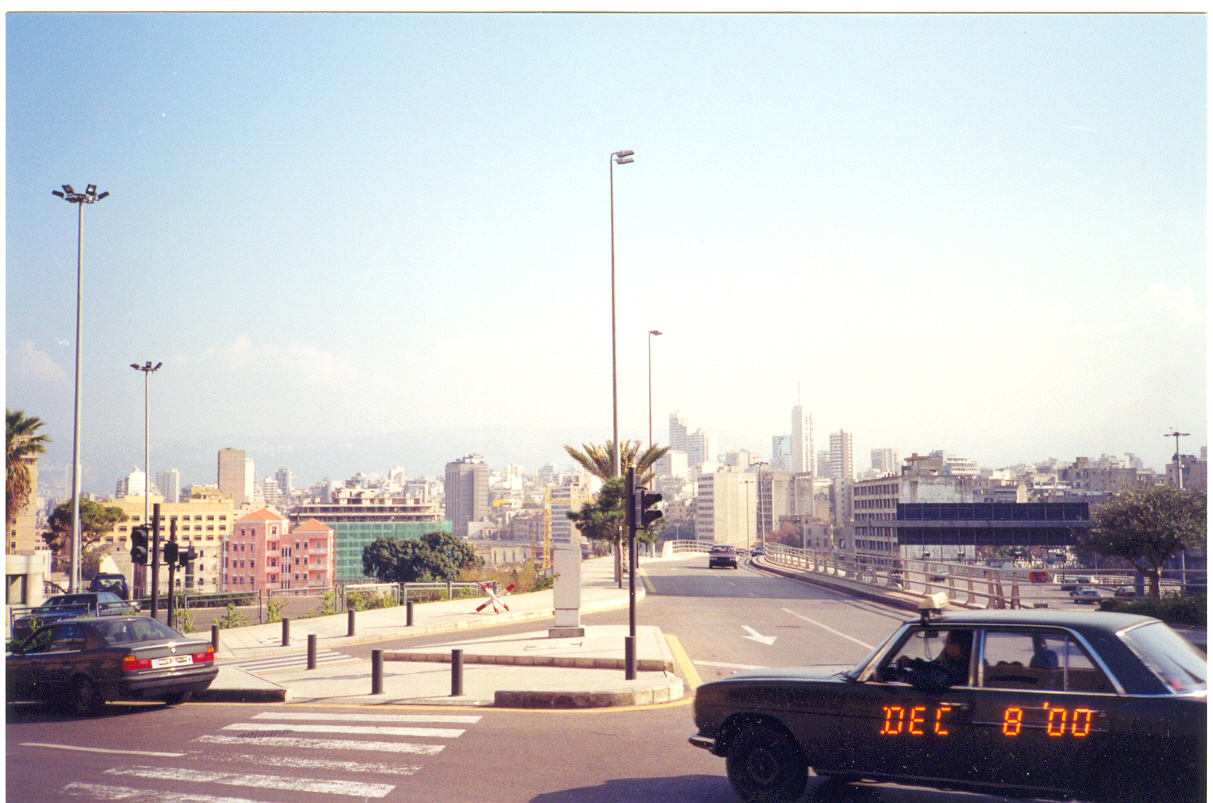
Beirut in December 2000

The State Secretary for Foreign Affairs Jan Eliasson visited Jordan on 30-31 January 1997. There, he was scheduled to meet with Prince Hassan bin Talal and Prime Minister and Foreign Minister Abdul Karim Kabariti. Eliasson then traveled to Lebanon to mark the reopening of the Swedish embassy in Beirut. In Lebanon, he was to meet with, among others, Foreign Minister Farès Boueiz. Leif Rensfeldt was appointed as chargé d'affaires and head of mission in Lebanon.

In August 1999, the Swedish government appointed Sweden's former UN Ambassador, 83-year-old Sverker Åström, as chargé d'affaires in Lebanon. He was to lead the Swedish embassy in Beirut during the autumn of 1999, while awaiting the new ambassador, who could not assume the position until January 2000 due to family reasons. In January 2000, Ambassador Ann Dismorr succeeded Åström in Beirut, and Sweden once again had a resident ambassador in Lebanon after a 15-year absence. When the new ambassador to Beirut, Anne Dismorr, presented her credentials to the President of Lebanon in the autumn of 1999, it became a front-page news story in the country's newspapers. To top off the newly revived Swedish-Lebanese relations, Foreign Minister Anna Lindh made a visit to Beirut in the spring of 2000. During the first year after the reopening of the Swedish embassy in Beirut, 3,000 consular cases were handled by the embassy.

On 26 April 2001, the Swedish government decided to close the embassy in Beirut, along with the embassies in Lima, Tunis, Kuwait City, and the Holy See. The reason was that the foreign service was running a deficit and needed to save money. The embassies were to be closed after Sweden completed its Presidency of the Council of the European Union at the end of June. From 2001, the Swedish ambassador in Damascus was also accredited to Beirut. From the same year, Hubert Fattal served as the Swedish Honorary Consul General in Beirut. From 2007, Bertrand Fattal served.

=== 2016–present: Reopening and Recent Developments ===
On 14 July 2016, the Swedish government decided to reopen the embassy in Beirut. The establishment of the embassy was to be fully completed by 2017. The embassy's activities would focus on political reporting and aid work, with particular attention to the Syrian civil war and its spillover in Lebanon.

On the night of 10 August 2023, an unknown individual threw a Molotov cocktail-like bomb at the embassy's main entrance. However, the bomb did not detonate and was removed by police bomb technicians. At the time, the embassy was housed in a high-rise office building, which provided a barrier that made it difficult to reach the embassy itself. A police source told the newspaper Expressen that there were strong indications that the motive behind the attack was related to the 2023 Quran burnings in Sweden.

In August 2024, it was reported that the embassy was to temporarily close, and the staff had been advised to travel to Cyprus due to the security situation in the region caused by the Israel–Hezbollah conflict. This involved six individuals who were now leaving Beirut. The Swedish government decided on 2 October 2024 to resume embassy operations in Beirut.

== Staff and tasks ==
The Ambassador of Sweden to Lebanon is also the chargé d'affaires of Sweden to Syria. Due to the conflict in Syria, the work of the Swedish embassy in Damascus is primarily managed out of Beirut. The embassy’s role is to represent Sweden as well as to follow and promote Swedish interests in Lebanon and Syria.

The embassy's operations after the reopening in 2017 would focus on political reporting and aid activities, with a particular focus on the Syrian civil war including its spillover in Lebanon. In 2022, the embassy was staffed by a team responsible for various areas:

- Political Affairs: The embassy manages political relations, communication, and promotion efforts.
- Security: The embassy has dedicated officers overseeing security matters.
- Administration and Consular Affairs: This section handles administrative tasks, consular services, including passport and citizenship issues, and support for Swedish citizens.
- Swedish Development Cooperation: The team manages Sweden’s development cooperation initiatives in the region.
- Migration Section: This section processes migration-related matters, including residence permit applications.

== Buildings ==
=== Chancery ===
Sweden's first resident ambassador was appointed in 1957. In 1958, the chancery of the legation was located in the Bisharat Building on Rue du Parlement in Downtown Beirut before moving to another location. From 1959 to 1966, the chancery was situated in the Farra Building on Rue Bliss.

Between 1967 and 1972, the chancery was located in the Moukarzel/Rebeiz Building on Rue Clemenceau. From 1973 to 1975, it was situated in the Bank of Beirut and the Arab Countries Building on Rue Clemenceau. The embassy closed in mid-December 1975, and from 1976, only a postal address was listed (P.O. Box 114560, Beirut).

After the embassy reopened in 1997, the chancery was located at Rue Clemenceau 34 from 1997 to 1999. Between 2000 and 2001, the chancery was located on the 7th floor of the 812 Tabaris Building on Avenue Charles Malek in the Achrafieh area of eastern Beirut. In 2017, the embassy was reopened. Since at least 2020, the chancery has been located at 1347 Minet el Hosn, French Avenue (next to Beirut Souks), French Avenue Building, 6th floor, Downtown Beirut.

=== Residence ===
From 1959 to at least 1968, the ambassador's residence was located in the Abboud Building on Rue Jenah.
