= Åke Jonsson (diplomat) =

Swedish diplomat (1919–2007)

- Born: Albert Åke Axel Jonsson; 7 August 1919; Gothenburg, Sweden
- Died: 10 July 2007 (aged 87); Lonay, Switzerland
- Education: Lundsbergs boarding school
- Alma mater: Uppsala University
- Occupation: Diplomat
- Years active: 1942–1990s
- Spouse: Gunnel Sahlin (m. 1958)

Albert Åke Axel Jonsson (7 August 1919 – 10 July 2007), was a Swedish diplomat. Jonsson had a distinguished diplomatic career, beginning as an attaché in Oslo in 1940 and serving in numerous postings, including Rome, New York City, Washington, D.C., Sydney, and Mexico City, where he became counselor of the embassy in 1959. He later held ambassadorial roles in Montevideo (1964–1969) and Beirut (1969–1974), with concurrent accreditations in several Middle Eastern capitals, and was Sweden's first ambassador to Sanaa in 1971. After retiring from diplomacy in 1974, he became Director of International Relations for the WWF in Switzerland, facilitating global collaboration on conservation. He also held various advisory and board roles, including with Albany International, Martel Catala et Cie, and WWF International, where he became an honorary member in 1987.

== Early life ==
Jonsson was born on 7 August 1919 in Domkyrkoförsamlingen in Gothenburg, Sweden, the son of Consul General Axel Jonsson (1888–1950) and his wife Sigyn Janson (1894–1934). Jonsson had three sisters, and the family lived in Särö, Halland County. He completed studentexamen at Lundsbergs boarding school in 1938 and earned a Master of Political Science degree from Uppsala University in 1942.

== Career ==
=== Diplomatic career ===
Jonsson began his career as an honorary attaché in Oslo in 1940, followed by Rome in 1941. In 1942, he served as an attaché at the Ministry for Foreign Affairs in Stockholm and subsequently worked in Rome that same year. His postings continued in New York City and Washington, D.C. in 1943, Sydney in 1946, and Canberra in 1947. Returning to the Foreign Ministry in 1948, he was appointed first secretary of the embassy in London in 1952, later serving in Bern in 1954, London again in 1955, Washington, D.C. in 1955, and Mexico City the same year. In 1959, he was promoted to counselor of the embassy in Mexico City. From 1961 to 1963, he served in Copenhagen, including as chargé d'affaires in 1963, before being appointed ambassador to Montevideo from 1964 to 1969. During his time in Uruguay, he chaired the Swedish GATT delegation in Punta del Este in 1967.

In 1969, Jonsson was appointed ambassador to Beirut, with concurrent accreditations to Amman, Damascus, Nicosia, and Riyadh. In 1971, he also became Sweden's first accredited ambassador to Sanaa. Jonsson concluded his diplomatic career in 1974 when, at his own request, he was assigned the status of ambassador at disposal.

=== Other work ===
From 1974 to 1977, Jonsson served as Director of International Relations for the World Wide Fund for Nature (WWF) in Morges, Switzerland. In this honorary role, he facilitated WWF's relationships with governments and organizations worldwide. From 1978 to 1979, he acted as a diplomatic advisor to the WWF and, from 1980 onward, at the World Conservation Centre in Gland, Switzerland.

Jonsson was a member of the European Advisory Board of Albany International in New York, USA, from 1977 to 1987. He served as a board member of Martel Catala et Cie from 1978 to 1992 and of Securities Atlanta Corporation starting in 1982. In 1987, he was made an honorary member of WWF International and, from 1991, served on the board of Fondation Baltzar W.A. von Platen.

== Personal life ==
On 14 January 1958, at the Swedish Embassy in Mexico City, Jonsson married Gunnel Sahlin (born 1924), the daughter of Gustaf Sahlin, chairman of Electrolux, and Sivi (née Michelson).

The Jonsson couple resided in Saint-Sulpice, Switzerland.

== Death ==
Jonsson died on 10 July 2007 in Lonay, Switzerland.

== Awards and decorations ==
- (Sweden) Commander of the Order of the Polar Star (6 June 1970)
- (Sweden) Knight of the Order of the Polar Star (1963)
- (Denmark) Knight of the Order of the Dannebrog
- Knight of the Order of the Crown of Italy

Diplomatic posts
Preceded by Gösta Hedengren	Ambassador of Sweden to Uruguay; 1964–1969	Succeeded by Tore Högstedt
Preceded by Claës Ivar Wollin	Ambassador of Sweden to Lebanon; 1969–1974	Succeeded by Jean-Jacques von Dardel
Preceded by Claës Ivar Wollin	Ambassador of Sweden to Jordan; 1969–1974	Succeeded by Jean-Jacques von Dardel
Preceded by Claës Ivar Wollin	Ambassador of Sweden to Syria; 1969–1974	Succeeded by Jean-Jacques von Dardel
Preceded by Claës Ivar Wollin	Ambassador of Sweden to Cyprus; 1969–1974	Succeeded by Axel Edelstam (from 1976)
Preceded by Claës Ivar Wollin	Ambassador of Sweden to Saudi Arabia; 1969–1974	Succeeded by Bengt Rösiö
Preceded by None	Ambassador of Sweden to North Yemen; 1971–1974	Succeeded by Bengt Rösiö
