= Widar Bagge =

Swedish diplomat (1886–1970)

- Born: 30 April 1886; Fuxerna, Sweden
- Died: 18 April 1970 (aged 83); Paris, France
- Education: Stockholm University College
- Occupation: Diplomat
- Years active: 1919–1951

Widar Bagge (30 April 1886 – 18 April 1970) was a Swedish diplomat.

== Early life ==
Bagge was born on 30 April 1886 in Fuxerna, Lilla Edet Municipality, Sweden, the son of John Bagge, a wholesaler, and his wife Fredrika (née Corin). He received a Candidate of Law degree in Stockholm in 1914.

== Career ==
Bagge worked as a temporary officer at the National Board of Trade in 1918 before becoming an attaché at the Ministry for Foreign Affairs in 1919. Bagge then served as an administrative officer in 1920, second legation secretary in London in 1921 and chargé d'affaires ad interim in Brussels in 1922. He was first legation secretary in Rome in 1923, in Helsinki in 1924 and in Tokyo in 1928. Bagge was the acting consul general in Shanghai in 1930, director at the Foreign Ministry in 1931, charges d'affaires in Warsaw in 1934, and legation counsellor in Paris in 1934. Bagge was then envoy in Tokyo and Bangkok from 1937 to 1945.

While in Tokyo, Bagge was attended by Foreign Minister Mamoru Shigemitsu, who wanted Bagge to convey a peace overture to the United States. Bagge cabled a surrender offer to the Swedish foreign office, for transmittal to the United Kingdom, which relayed it to the United States. Japan was prepared to relinquish all the territory it took in the war and Manchukuo, which it had seized in 1931. Bagge emphasized that the offer must be considered a serious one. The offer, however, came to nothing.

He was envoy in Cairo and Addis Ababa from 1945 to 1951, including in Damascus and Beirut from 1947. In Cairo, he fell in love with Yolande Harmer, a successful Israeli spy. Before she was arrested in July 1948, she had succeeded in changing Bagge's views on Zionism. The assassination of Folke Bernadotte in September 1948, however, made his enthusiasm to cool again.

== Death ==
Bagge died on 18 April 1970 in Paris, France. He was buried on 11 May 1970 at Norra begravningsplatsen in Solna Municipality.

== Awards and decorations ==
=== Swedish ===
- (Sweden) King Gustaf V's Jubilee Commemorative Medal (1928)
- (Sweden) Commander Grand Cross of the Order of the Polar Star (6 June 1951)
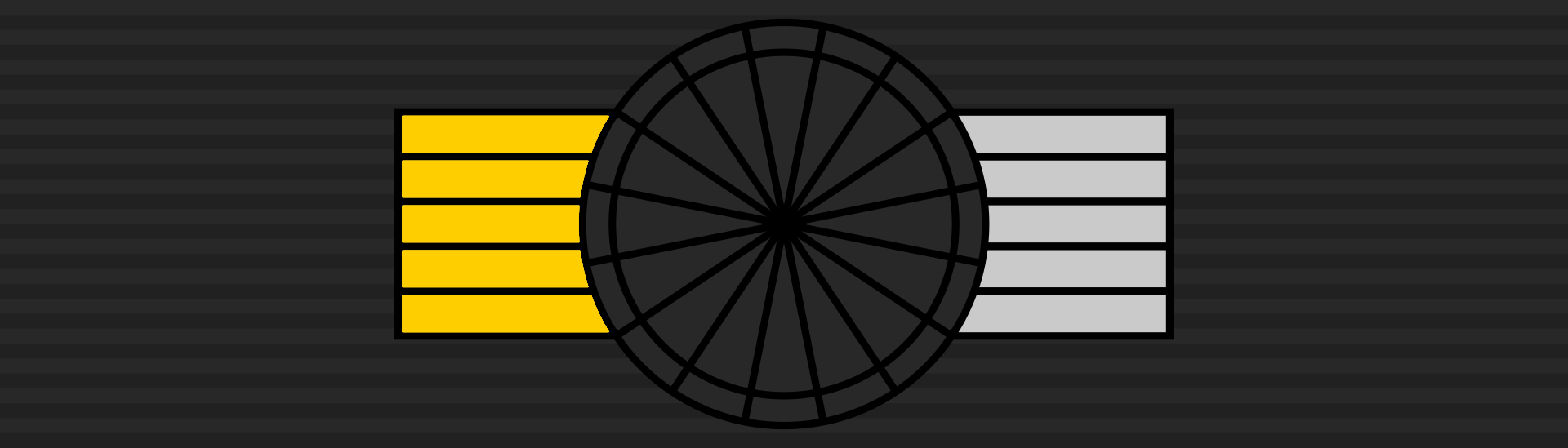
- (Sweden) Commander 1st Class of the Order of the Polar Star (6 June 1939)
- (Sweden) Knight of the Order of the Polar Star (1935)

=== Foreign ===
- (Belgium) Grand Cross of the Order of Leopold II (February 1947)
- (Kingdom of Egypt) Grand Cross of the Order of the Nile
- Grand Cross of the Order of the Lion of Finland
- (Greece) Grand Cross of the Order of the Phoenix
- (Netherlands) Grand Cross of the Order of Orange-Nassau
- (Norway) Grand Cross of the Order of St. Olav
- Grand Cross of the Order of the Crown of Thailand
- (Hungary) Grand Cross of the Hungarian Order of Merit
- (Bolivia) Grand Officer of the Order of the Condor of the Andes
- Commander of the Order of the White Rose of Finland
- (France) Commander of the Legion of Honour
- Commander of the Order of the Crown of Italy
- (Portugal) Commander of the Military Order of Christ (9 June 1933)
- (Empire of Japan) First Class of the Order of the Sacred Treasure
- Commander of the Decoration of Honour for Services to the Republic of Austria

Diplomatic posts
Preceded by Johan Hultman	Envoy of Sweden to Japan; 1937–1945	Succeeded by Erik von Sydow as Chargé d'affaires ad interim
Preceded by Johan Hultman	Envoy of Sweden to Thailand; 1937–1945	Succeeded by Torsten Hammarström (from 1948)
Preceded by Ivan Danielsson (until 1942)	Envoy of Sweden to Egypt; 1945–1951	Succeeded by Gustaf Weidel
Preceded by None	Envoy of Sweden to Ethiopia; 1945–1951	Succeeded by Erik Wisén
Preceded by None	Envoy of Sweden to Syria; 1947–1951	Succeeded by Gustaf Weidel
Preceded by None	Envoy of Sweden to Lebanon; 1947–1951	Succeeded by Gustaf Weidel
