= List of ambassadors of Sweden to Lebanon =

Ambassador of Sweden to Lebanon
- Lesser coat of arms of the Kingdom of Sweden
- Incumbent; Tomas Brundin since August 2026
- Ministry for Foreign Affairs; Swedish Embassy, Beirut
- Style: His or Her Excellency (formal); Mr. or Madam Ambassador (informal)
- Reports to: Minister for Foreign Affairs
- Seat: Beirut, Lebanon
- Appointer: Government of Sweden
- Term length: No fixed term
- Inaugural holder: Widar Bagge
- Formation: 1947
- Website: Swedish Embassy, Beirut

The Ambassador of Sweden to Lebanon (known formally as the Ambassador of the Kingdom of Sweden to the Republic of Lebanon) is the official representative of the government of Sweden to the president of Lebanon and government of Lebanon. Sweden established diplomatic relations with Lebanon in 1947 and appointed its first resident ambassador in Beirut in 1957. The Swedish embassy in Beirut was temporarily closed during the Lebanese Civil War in 1985 and again in 2001, with staff periodically reassigned to Damascus or other locations. It was reopened in 2016, but in August 2024, the embassy was temporarily closed and staff were relocated to Cyprus due to the Israel–Hezbollah conflict.

== History ==
Sweden recognized Lebanon and Syria as independent states on 2 November 1945. Sweden and Lebanon established diplomatic relations in 1947. In the council on 7 February 1947, Sweden's minister in Cairo, Envoy Widar Bagge, was appointed as envoy to both Beirut and Damascus, while remaining stationed in Cairo. In June 1957, Åke Sjölin was appointed as Sweden's first resident envoy in Beirut.

In March 1960, an agreement was reached between the Swedish and Lebanese governments on the mutual elevation of the respective countries' legations to embassies. The diplomatic rank was thereafter changed to ambassador instead of envoy extraordinary and minister plenipotentiary. In connection with this, Sweden's newly appointed envoy to Beirut, Gösta Brunnström, was designated as ambassador.

Due to the unstable situation in Lebanon and concern for the safety of personnel, no posted officials were assigned to the Embassy in Beirut during the period February–September 1984. From the autumn of 1984, the head of mission was stationed in Amman, Jordan with concurrent accreditation to Beirut, where the mission was led by a chargé d'affaires ad interim. During the Lebanese Civil War in November 1985, it was announced that the Swedish embassy in Beirut would be temporarily closed until the situation stabilized. Ambassador Ingemar Stjernberg was officially the ambassador to Lebanon but had been stationed in Stockholm since New Year's Eve 1985. From 1987, he served as consul general in West Berlin but remained accredited as ambassador to Beirut.

From 1990, Sweden's ambassador in Damascus was also accredited to Beirut. In the fall of 1996, the Swedish government decided to reassign Swedish staff to the mission in Beirut. The mission was reactivated in February 1996, and Leif Rensfeldt was appointed as chargé d'affaires and head of mission. The ambassador in Damascus remained accredited to Beirut.

In January 2000, Ambassador Ann Dismorr succeeded chargé d'affaires Sverker Åström in Beirut, and Sweden once again had a resident ambassador in Lebanon after 15 years of absence. On 26 April 2001, the Swedish government decided to close the embassy in Beirut. The embassy would be closed only after Sweden had completed its Presidency of the Council of the European Union at the end of June. From 2001, the Swedish ambassador in Damascus was once again accredited to Beirut as well.

From October 2014, Sweden's chargé d'affaires in Damascus, Diana Janse, was stationed in Beirut due to the security situation. On 1 April 2015, she was appointed as the new resident ambassador in Beirut. On July 14, 2016, the Swedish government decided to reopen an embassy in Beirut. The embassy was to be fully established by 2017.

In August 2024, the embassy was temporarily closed and staff were relocated to Cyprus due to the Israel–Hezbollah conflict.

== List of representatives ==
Name	Period	Resident / Non-resident	Title	Resident / Concurrent accreditation	Notes	Presented credentials	Ref
Widar Bagge	1947–1951	Non-resident	Envoy	Resident in Cairo			
Gustaf Weidel	1951–1955	Non-resident	Envoy	Resident in Cairo			
Brynolf Eng	1955–1957	Non-resident	Envoy	Resident in Cairo.			
Åke Sjölin	1957–1960	Resident	Envoy	Dual accreditation to Damascus (1957–1958) and Amman (1957–1960)			
Bo Alander	1958–1958	Resident	Chargé d'affaires ad interim				
Gösta Brunnström	1960–1965	Resident	Ambassador	Dual accreditation to Riyadh, Amman, and Nicosia (1960–1965) as well as Damascus (1961–1965)			
Claës Ivar Wollin	1965–1969	Resident	Ambassador	Dual accreditation to Amman, Damascus, Jeddah, and Nicosia			
Åke Jonsson	1969–1974	Resident	Ambassador	Dual accreditation to Amman, Damascus, and Nicosia (1969–1974), Riyadh (1969–1974) and Sanaa (1971–1974)			
Jean-Jacques von Dardel	1974–1978	Resident	Ambassador	Dual accreditation to Damascus and Amman			
Sten Strömholm	1979–1983	Resident	Ambassador	Dual accreditation to Damascus and Amman			
Ingemar Stjernberg	1983–1990	Resident (Note: Stjernberg was officially an ambassador to Lebanon but had been stationed in Stockholm since New Year's Eve 1985, and since 1987, he served as Consul General in West Berlin while remaining an accredited ambassador to Beirut.)	Ambassador	Dual accreditation to Amman			
Lars Bjarme	1984–1985	Resident	Chargé d'affaires ad interim (Note: Held the diplomatic rank of first embassy secretary.)				
Rolf Gauffin	1990–1991	Non-resident	Ambassador	Resident in Damascus			
Stig Elvemar	1991–1994	Non-resident	Ambassador	Resident in Damascus			
Jan Nordlander	1994–1997	Non-resident	Ambassador	Resident in Damascus			
Leif Rensfeldt	1996–1999	Resident	Chargé d'affaires ad interim				
Tommy Arwitz	1997–1999	Non-resident	Ambassador	Resident in Damascus			
Sverker Åström	1999–1999	Resident	Chargé d'affaires				
Ann Dismorr	1999–2001	Resident	Ambassador				
Viola Furubjelke	2001–2005	Non-resident	Ambassador	Resident in Damascus			
Catharina Kipp	2005–2008	Non-resident	Ambassador	Resident in Damascus			
Niklas Kebbon	2008–2015	Non-resident	Ambassador	Resident in Damascus			
Diana Janse	2015–2015	Resident	Ambassador		Also chargé d'affaires in Damascus (from October 2014)		
Peter Semneby	2015 – August 2017	Resident	Ambassador		Also chargé d'affaires in Damascus		
Jörgen Lindström	September 2017 – August 2020	Resident	Ambassador		Also chargé d'affaires in Damascus		
Harriet Pedersen	September 2020 – 2021	Resident	Ambassador				
Ann Dismorr	2021–2024	Resident	Ambassador		Also chargé d'affaires in Damascus		
Jessica Svärdström	2024 – August 2026	Resident	Ambassador		Also chargé d'affaires in Damascus		
Tomas Brundin	August 2026 – present	Resident	Ambassador			3 September 2026	

== See also ==
- Embassy of Sweden, Beirut
