= Feminism in Bangladesh =

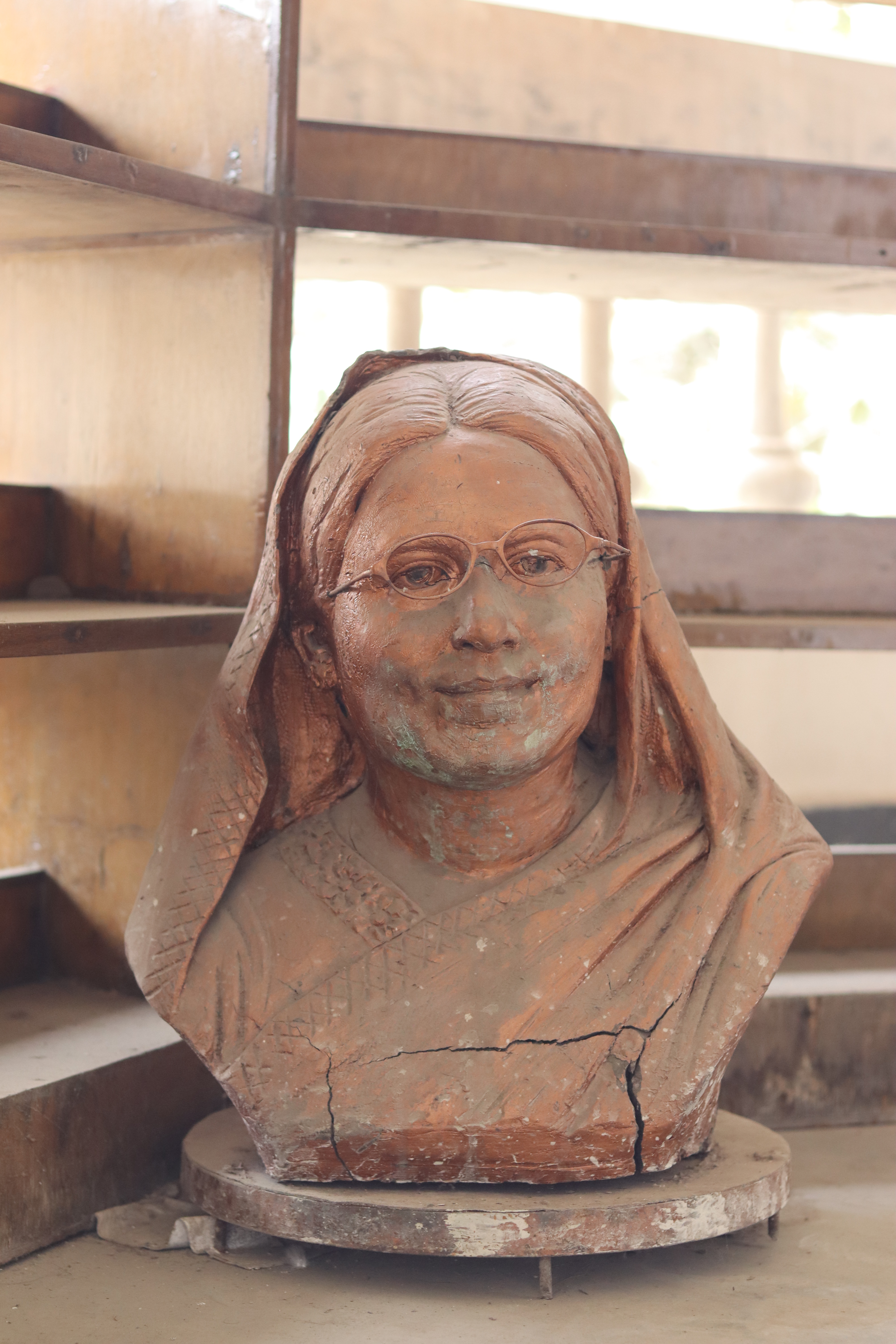
Sculpture of Begum Rokeya at Burdwan House, Bangla academy

Feminism in Bangladesh (Bengali: বাংলাদেশে নারীবাদ) seeks equal rights of women in Bangladesh through social and political change. Article 28 of Bangladesh constitution states that "Women shall have equal rights with men in all spheres of the State and of public life". Feminism is Bangladesh reflects a change in the understanding of ideal womanhood. Until the 19th and early 20th century, women in Bangladesh were seen as symbols of tradition, spirituality and domestic life who were supposed to represent a pure, non-western identity. However, today they are challenging these old ideas and redefining their roles in society with a stronger focus on independence, equality and active participation in public life.

Inspired by the legacy of early feminist thinker Begum Rokeya, Bangladeshi feminist have spoken for equal rights and social justice. Women played important role in national movements from the Bangladesh Liberation War in 1971 to the July Uprising in 2024.

Women's contribution in Bangladesh's garment industry has helped strengthen the feminism movements by giving millions of women jobs, income and greater independence. Women's growing presence in the workforce has challenged traditional gender roles and pushed for better rights, equality and working conditions.

== History ==
Feminist movements in Bangladesh started long before its independence. During the 19th century the social reform movement, mostly carried out by male social leaders, worked to abolish practices such as infanticide, child marriage, and widow burning. Women activists in Bangladesh organized to claim their rights during the British and Pakistan period of Bangladesh. They mobilized to fight regarding issues including violence against women, economic opportunities for women, equal representation in politics for women, reproductive rights, reforming family law, and gender equality in public policies. During the Pakistan period the feminist movement was more focused on politics and national struggles. The feminist movement of the 1970s and 1980s was led by professional women from urban areas.

=== Feminist movement timeline ===
Era	Year	Activities
19th Century	1886	Swarnakumari Devi established the Sakhi Samiti (Women's Friend Association), one of the first women's voluntary associations in Bengal, aiming to support and empower women.
Early 20th Century	1905	Begum Rokeya Sakhawat Hossain published "Sultana's Dream," a pioneering feminist science fiction work envisioning a society where women lead and men are secluded.
	1916	Begum Rokeya founded the Muslim Women's Association, advocating for women's education and employment opportunities.
	1926	Kamini Roy, a prominent poet and social worker, led the Bangiya Nari Samaj, an organization campaigning for women's suffrage in Bengal.
Mid 20th Century	1947	Manikuntala Sen became active in the Communist Party of India, advocating for women's rights and social reforms.
Independence of Bangladesh	1971	During the Liberation War of Bangladesh in 1971, the women of Bengal played a crucial role by supporting freedom fighters, helping run refugee camps on the border of India, risking their lives to hide freedom fighters in their homes, and spreading information. During this 9-month-long war, widespread sexual violence against women occurred, with an estimated 200,000 to 400,000 women raped by the Pakistani Army and its affiliates. On 22 December 1971, the Government of Bangladesh gave these women the title of Birangona, which means "War Heroine".
	1972	The 1970s marked the emergence of NGOs in Bangladesh. After the independence of Bangladesh the largest NGO in Bangladesh BRAC was established in 1972 to provide relief and rehabilitation in a war-torn country. By the end of 1970s many other non-profit started work in Bangladesh and their focus shifted from nation-building to poverty alleviation and women empowerment.
Late 20th Century	1992	In Bangladesh, feminist activism through literature began to emerge and gain visibility in the late 20th century. Humayun Azad published "Naree", a comprehensive feminist treatise in Bengali that critiqued patriarchal structures and advocated for women's rights.
21st Century	2000	The ban on Humayun Azad's "Naree" was lifted, following a legal battle that Azad won, marking a significant victory for freedom of expression and feminist literature in Bangladesh.
	2024	Feminist activists and common Bangladeshi women took part in the July Uprising by leading marches and bravely facing the police and military. Their strong presence became a powerful symbol of change, which helped reshape the feminist discourse in Bangladesh by showing that women are not just victims; they are active leaders in political struggle.

== Contemporary developments ==
=== Economic empowerment through the garment industry ===
In the 1980s and 1990s, many women in Bangladesh moved from villages to cities to work in the ready-made garment (RMG) sector.The industry created many entry-level jobs, allowing women and girls to migrate and work independently.

Working in RMG sector improved women's lives in several ways. It helped them delay marriage and childbirth, improve their health and nutrition, gave freedom of mobility and gain more control over their personal agency. Now many women are able to support their families financially, send their children to school and take part in family planning.

Although women are still facing issues in the RMG industry like low wages and poor working conditions, the RMG sector has increased women's confidence and independence.It has challenged traditional gender norms, strengthened women's role in families, increased social awareness in women's lives and helped them become more aware of their rights and social position.

== Issues ==
=== Muslim Family Law ===
The Muslim Family Law was enacted by the British Indian government. Which is discriminatory against women's rights law.

=== Readymade garments industry ===
Women's role in Bangladesh's ready-made garment (RMG) industry has attracted significant attention and debate among scholars. While some economists view women's labor in RMG sector as a key driver of economic growth, trade unionists and researchers highlight concerns about exploitation, particularly low wages and labor rights issues which was supported by multiple reports on labor conditions.

=== Women in politics ===
Despite women making up nearly half of Bangladesh's voters, their representation in formal politics remains limited. In the general election on February 12, 2026, only 78 of the 1,981 candidates (3.93%) were women, and only seven women secured seats at the parliament out of the 300 directly contested positions.

=== Gender-based violence ===
Official records of Bangladesh Police suggest that incidents of violence against women rose in the first half of 2025 compared to the same time-period in 2024. Dr. Fauzia Moslem, president of the Bangladesh Mahila Parishad (Women's Council of Bangladesh), connects this trend to the growing influence and messaging of some religious groups who aims to control women's movement and role in public life.

== Bangladeshi feminists ==
- Begum Rokeya was a notable feminist, educator, and activist. She believed that women could gain freedom through education and Economic independence. On 1909 she inaugurated a girls' school named Sakhawat Memorial Girls' School in Bhagalpur with just five students. She persuaded parents to send their daughters to school. She even arranged horse-carriages so girls could travel safely while observing purdah, helping Muslim middle-class girls break the taboo of studying outside home.
- Kamini Roy was the first woman honors graduate in British India.
- Nawab Faizunnesa was the first woman Nawab of South Asia, she is known for her campaign for female education and other social issues related to women
- Mohammad Nasiruddin, Bangladeshi journalist, women's rights activist, and publisher of Begum
- Fazilatunnesa, Bangladeshi mathematician, Principal of Eden Mohila College, and first female post-graduate of Muslim Bengal.
- Nurjahan Begum, pioneer female journalist and editor of Begum, the first women's magazine in Bangladesh.
- Nurun Nahar Faizannesa was a leader of the feminist movement in Bangladesh-
- Mahmuda Khatun Siddiqua, Bangladeshi poet, essayist, and a pioneering women's liberation activist.
- Sultana Kamal is a Bangladeshi lawyer and human rights activist. She serves as the executive director of Ain o Salish Kendra, a civil rights organization.
- Sufia Kamal, Bangladeshi poet, feminist leader, and social activist.
- Taslima Nasrin is a feminist who is known for her criticism of religion.
- Syeda Razia Faiz was the first female elected member of parliament in Bangladesh.
- Hasna Begum is a contemporary Bangladeshi philosopher of feminism and held the prestigious Rokeya Chair by the University Grants Commission (UGC).
- Rokeya Rahman Kabeer was a woman emancipation activist.
- Masuda Khatun was a pioneering feminist who was given the nickname Agni Nagini (Fire Serpent) by Kazi Nazrul Islam.
- Wasfia Nazreen is the first Bangladeshi, and Bengali person of any gender, to climb all the Seven Summits.
- Shaheda Mustafiz is the first female programmer of Bangladesh.
- Ayesha Khanam, Bangladeshi feminist leader and freedom fighter.
- Rounaq Jahan, Bangladeshi political scientist, feminist leader, and author.
- Angela Gomes, social worker and founder of Banchte Shekha (Learn How To Survive)
- Husne Ara Kamal, Bangladeshi academician and social worker.
- Shireen Huque, cofounder of Naripokkho and anti-violence crusader.
- Rahnuma Ahmed, anthropologist, activist, and author
- Nazma Akter, Bangladeshi trade unionist and founder of the Awaj Foundation.
- Tasaffy Hossain, founder of the feminist organization Bonhishikha, that first staged The Vagina Monologues in Bangladesh.
- Trishia Nashtaran, founder of the feminist grassroots organization Meye Network.
- Several women leaders played key roles in organizing efforts during the Liberation War of Bangladesh. These included elected representatives from the 1970 reserved women's seats such as Nurjahan Murshid, Rafia Akhtar Dolly, Syeda Sajeda Chowdhury, Momtaz Begum, and Badrunnessa Ahmed. Other important women leaders included Motia Chowdhury, Maleka Begum, Makhduma Nargis Ratna, Nurun Nahar Chowdhury, poet Sufia Kamal, Shamsun Nahar Rahman, Selina Banu, Ashalata Sen, and Ayesha Khanam, all of whom made important contributions.

== Organizations ==
- Begum magazine, founded in 1947, was first illustrated women's publication which gave a platform for women writers in Bengal.
- Bangladesh Mahila Samiti (formerly Dhaka branch of All Pakistan Women's Association), opened in 1949
- Dhaka Ladies Club, opened in 1951
- Bangladesh Mahila Parishad, formed in 1970
- Banchte Shekha, established in 1976
- Naripokkho, formed in 1973
- Bangladesh National Woman Lawyers' Association, formed in 1979.
- Hill Women's Federation(HWF)formed in 1988
- Acid Survivors Foundation, founded in 1999
- Awaj Foundation, founded in 2003
- Bonhishikha, formed in 2010.
- Somporker Noya Setu (SNS), formed in 2010
- Bangladesh Feminist Archives (BFA), formed in 2024.

== See also ==
- Women in Bangladesh
- Islamic feminism
- Women in Hinduism
- Women in Islam
- Feminist theology
- Gender inequality in Bangladesh
