= Moni Rani Das =

Bangladeshi Dalit rights activist

Moni Rani Das is a Bangladeshi Dalit rights activist. She is known for her advocacy for the rights of Dalit women and her appointment as the first Dalit to serve on the National Human Rights Commission, Bangladesh. She is also the coordinator and founder of Dalit Women's Forum (DWF), a Dhaka-based organization for dalit-rights activism. She was awarded the One World Action/Sternberg Award in 2010 on behalf of DWF.

== Early life and background ==
Das was born and raised in a "cleaners' colony" in Dhaka, Bangladesh, a segregated community for street cleaners and domestic workers. As a member of the Dalit community, she faced significant discrimination. She was the first girl in her community to go to school but was unable to complete her education. She was married by the age of 15.

== Activism ==
Moni Rani Das has been an activist with the Bangladesh Dalit and Excluded Rights Movement (BDERM) for over two decades, where she has worked to mobilize local women to join the Dalit rights movement. Her activism is driven by a desire to improve the conditions for future generations of Dalits in Bangladesh.

Das has participated in capacity-building workshops organized by Nagorik Uddyog, a civic initiative, where she gained knowledge on policy development and budget advocacy to address poverty within the Dalit community. She has also been a vocal advocate for reserved seats for Dalit communities in the Jatiya Sangsad (the national parliament of Bangladesh).

=== Dalit Women's Forum ===
Moni Rani Das co-founded Dalit Women's Forum (DWF) in 2006 where she currently serves as the president and coordinator. The organization is based in one of the Dalit colonies in central Dhaka and provides networking and social upliftment opportunitites to dalit women.

== Recognition ==
In recognition of her work, she was appointed to the National Human Rights Commission, Bangladesh, becoming the first Dalit person to hold a position on the commission. As the coordinator of the DWF, she has continued to campaign for the rights of Dalit people in Bangladesh.

== See also ==
- Women in Bangladesh
- Feminism in Bangladesh
