= Women in Bangladesh =

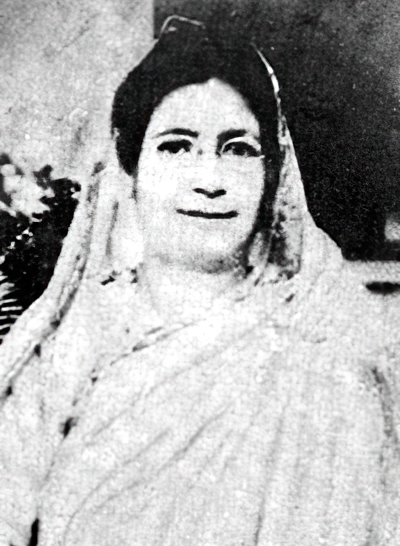
- Begum Rokeya was a pioneer writer and a social worker of the undivided Bengal. She is most famous for her efforts in favour of gender equality and other social issues.

General statistics
- Maternal mortality (per 100,000): 176 (2015)
- Women in parliament: ≈2.3% (2026; MPs with direct vote; out of 300 seats); 14% (2026; seat reserved for woman; out of 350 total seats)
- Women over 25 with secondary education: 45.3% (2018)
- Women in labour force: 36.0% (2018)

Gender Inequality Index
- Value: 0.530 (2021)
- Rank: 131st out of 191

Global Gender Gap Index
- Value: 0.775 (2025)
- Rank: 24th out of 148

The status of women in Bangladesh has been subject to many important changes over the past few centuries. Bangladeshi women have made significant progress since the country's independence in 1971, where women in the region experienced increased political empowerment for women, better job prospects, increased opportunities of education and the adoption of new laws to protect their rights through Bangladesh's policies in the last four decades. Still, women in Bangladesh continue to struggle to achieve equal status to men due to societal norms that enforce restrictive gender roles as well as poor implementation of laws that were set to protect women.

The government of Bangladesh has mandated the reservation of at least 33% of all committee positions for women.

In legal matters, Bangladesh follows a mixed system, predominantly of common law inherited from its colonial past as well as some Islamic laws that mostly concern personal status issues. Politically, women have been comparatively prominent in the sphere: since 1990s the Prime Ministers elected were women. To ensure the well-being and progress of women, the government has implemented and revised several laws, establishing institutions and formulating targeted policies. These efforts aim to safeguard women's interests and create an environment conducive to their empowerment. By introducing gender-sensitive policies and programs, the government strives to enable women to play a vital role in society and actively contribute to development as empowered agents.

The budget allocated for gender-related initiatives in the fiscal year 2023–2024 amounts to Tk175,350.5 crore. Out of this total, 58.4% is designated for empowering women and enhancing their social dignity, 33.5% is allocated for expanding women's access to public services, and 8.1% is dedicated to improving women's productivity and participation in the labor force. Enhanced engagement of women in socio-economic and political endeavors has led to noteworthy advancements in gender parity across all sectors within Bangladesh. For the second consecutive year, Bangladesh has claimed the foremost position in gender equality among South Asian nations, as affirmed by the Gender Gap Index. Notably, the country has effectively bridged 73% of its comprehensive gender gap, as indicated by the Global Gender Gap Index of 2020. During the period spanning 1996 to 2017, the national female labor force participation rate escalated from 15.8% to 36.3%, surpassing the South Asian average of 35%.

== History ==
The extent to which women in the region in the past has varied over time, where the status of women varied between religious and ethnic groups, as well as across social classes.

=== Pre-Independence Era ===
Before the 20th century, women in this region, as well as in Bengal in general, experienced different levels of autonomy depending on where they lived. While women who lived in rural areas were able to roam around in groups and appear in public, those who lived in urban areas would have to observe purdah by covering up. Prevalent in both Hindu and Muslim families at the time, these middle-class and upper-class women were mostly homemakers who barely went outside; any occasional movement outside were done inside cloaked carriages. This was seen as a way to protect women from unknown dangers of urban areas by the patriarch of the house. However, purdah was not common among lower-class women.

Polygamy was practiced in this region regardless of religion. Nevertheless, the practice was not common among the general populace and was more commonly observed in the aristocratic class; recent eras see a further decline in polygamous relationships. Historically, Sati was practiced in this region, mostly among the upper class, until the late 19th century.

=== Post-Independence Era ===
Available data on health, nutrition, education, and economic performance indicated that in the 1980s the status of women in Bangladesh remained considerably inferior to that of men. Women, in custom and practice, remained subordinate to men in almost all aspects of their lives; greater autonomy was the privilege of the rich or the necessity of the very poor.

Most women's lives remained centred on their traditional roles, and they had limited access to markets, productive services, education, health care, and local government. This lack of opportunities contributed to high fertility patterns, which diminished family well-being, contributed to the malnourishment and generally poor health of children, and frustrated educational and other national development goals. In fact, acute poverty at the margin appeared to be hitting hardest at women. As long as women's access to health care, education, and training remained limited, prospects for improved productivity among the female population remained poor.

About 82 percent of women lived in rural areas in the late 1980s. The majority of rural women, perhaps 70 percent, were in small cultivator, tenant, and landless households; many worked as labourers part-time or seasonally, usually in post-harvest activities, and received payment in kind or in meager cash wages. Another 20 percent, mostly in poor landless households, depended on casual labour, gleaning, begging, and other irregular sources of income; typically, their income was essential to household survival. The remaining 10 percent of women were in households mainly in the professional, trading, or large-scale landowning categories, and they usually did not work outside the home.

The economic contribution of women was substantial but largely unacknowledged. Women in rural areas were responsible for most of the post-harvest work, which was done in the chula, and for keeping livestock, poultry, and small gardens. Women in cities relied on domestic and traditional jobs, but in the 1980s they increasingly worked in manufacturing jobs, especially in the readymade garment industry. Those with more education worked in government, health care, and teaching, but their numbers remained very small. Continuing high rates of population growth and the declining availability of work based in the chula meant that more women sought employment outside the home. Accordingly, the female labour force participation rate doubled between 1974 and 1984, when it reached nearly 8 percent. Female wage rates in the 1980s were low, typically ranging between 20 and 30 percent of male wage rates.

In 2019 Bangladesh's highest court ruled that on marriage registration forms, a word used to describe unmarried women that can also mean "virgin" must be replaced with a word that only means "an unmarried woman".

The official religion of Bangladesh is Islam and 90% of the population being Muslim.

== Education and economic development ==
=== Education ===
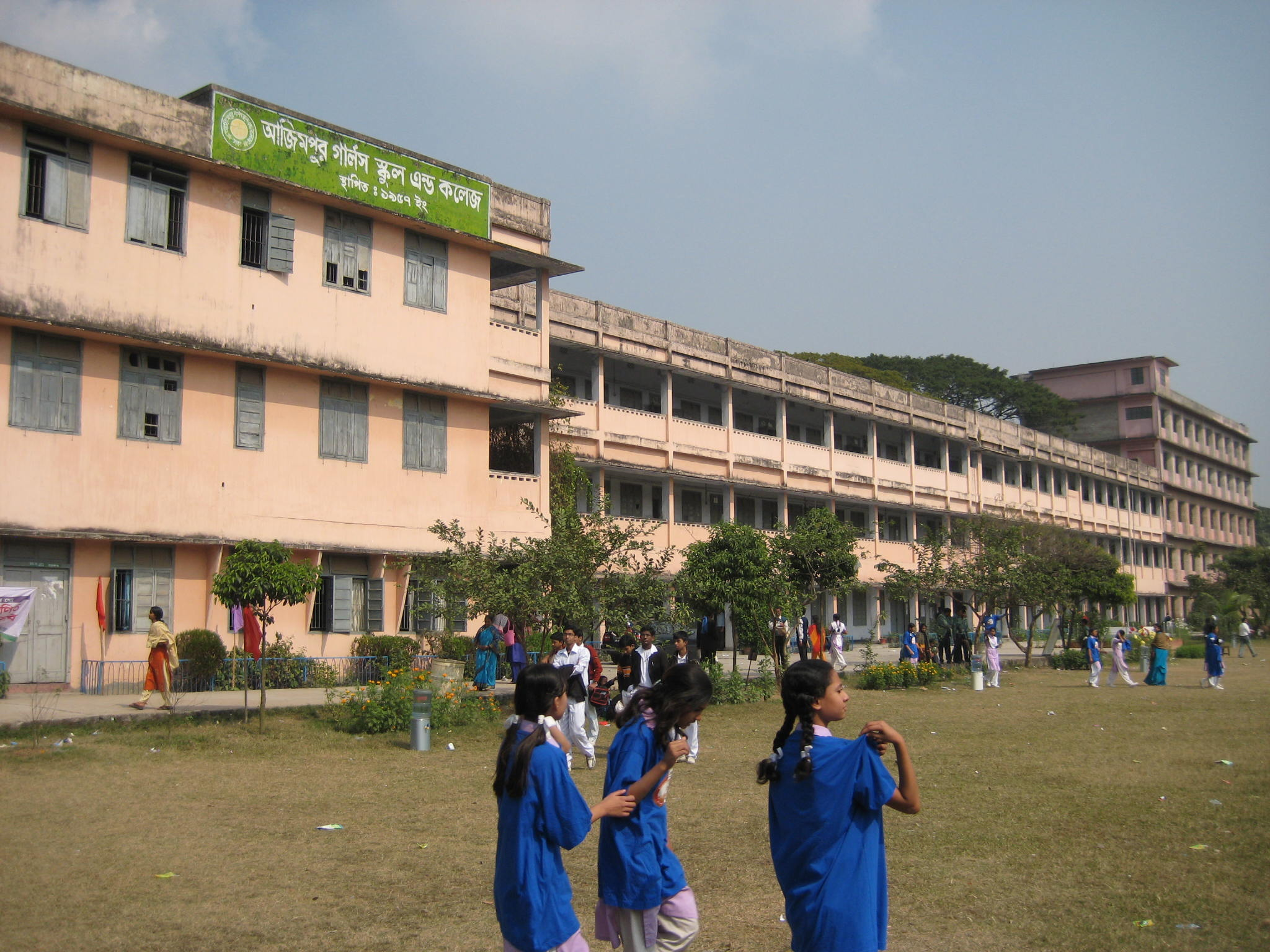
Azimpur Girls' School in Bangladesh

The literacy rate in Bangladesh is lower for females (55.1%) compared to males (62.5%) – 2012 estimates for population aged 15 and over.

During the past decades, Bangladesh has improved its education policies; and the access of girls to education has increased. In the 1990s, girls' enrolment in primary school has increased rapidly. Although there is now gender parity in enrolments at the primary and lower secondary school level, the percentage of girls drops in the later secondary school years.

=== Workforce participation ===
Women in Bangladesh are engaged in many work activities, from domestic work inside the home, to outside paid work. Women's work are often undervalued and under-reported. The Bangladeshi government has set aside a substantial annual budget of around $100 million to promote the advancement of women in various areas. In particular, the Readymade Garments (RMG) sector, which employs approximately 4 million women and plays a crucial role in the nation's economy, receives considerable attention. To further support women's entrepreneurial endeavors, Bangladesh Bank offers collateral-free loans, extending financial assistance to millions of aspiring women entrepreneurs. This dedicated focus on empowering women economically showcases the government's commitment to fostering gender equality and women's empowerment.

=== Land and property rights ===
Women's inheritance rights are poor: discriminatory laws and patriarchal social norms make it difficult for many women to have access to land. Most women inherit according to the local interpretations of Sharia Law.

=== Engagement in public life ===
Bangladesh has continuously had a female prime minister for 30 years. This is the longest unbroken tenure for a democratically elected female head of government in the world. 21% of MPs in the Jatiya Sangsad are women.

== Crimes against women ==
=== Rape ===
Bengali settlers and soldiers in the Chittagong Hill Tracts have raped native Jumma (Chakma) women "with impunity" with the Bangladeshi security forces doing little to protect the Jummas and instead assisting the rapists and settlers.

The indigenous Buddhist and Hindu Jummas of Sino-Tibetan background have been targeted by the Bangladeshi government with massive amounts of violence and genocidal policies as ethnic Bengali settlers swarmed into Jumma lands, seized control and massacred them with the Bangladeshi military engaging in mass rape of women, massacres of entire villages and attacks on Hindu and Buddhist religious sites with deliberate targeting of monks and nuns.

=== Child marriage ===
Bangladesh has one of the highest rates of child marriage in the world. The practice of dowry, although illegal, contributes to this phenomenon. 29% of girls get married before age 15 and 65% before the age of 18. Government action has had little effect, and has been contradictory: although the government has pledged to end child marriage by 2041, the Prime Minister in 2015 attempted to lower the age of marriage for girls from 18 to 16. An exception to the law was instituted so that marriage at 16 is permitted with parental consent.

Child marriage in Bangladesh has increased since the COVID-19 pandemic, with the country now recording the highest rate in South Asia. According to the 2025 United Nations Population Fund report, 51% of Bangladeshi girls are married before the age of 18. The rate was around 33% before the pandemic.

Social activist Rasheda K. Chowdhury stated that "poverty is the primary driver of early marriages," noting that despite having the highest enrollment of girls in secondary schools in the region, Bangladesh continues to struggle due to limited educational access in rural areas and lack of community awareness. Azizul Haque of World Vision Bangladesh highlighted that in remote areas, where schooling often ends at eighth grade, girls are perceived as a financial burden, further contributing to early marriage rates.

=== Domestic violence ===
In 2010, Bangladesh enacted the Domestic Violence (Prevention and Protection) Act, 2010. Domestic violence (DV) is accepted by a significant percentage of the population: in the 2011 DHS survey, 32.5% of women said that a husband is justified in hitting or beating his wife for specific reasons (the most common reason given was if the wife "argues with him" – at 22.4%). In recent years violence towards women, committed by men, has decreased significantly and is considerably low compared to south Asian countries like Sri Lanka, Nepal, and India.

=== Dowry ===
Dowry violence is a problem in Bangladesh. The country has taken action against the practice of dowry through laws such as Dowry Prohibition Act, 1980; Dowry Prohibition (Amendment) Ordinance, 1982; and Dowry Prohibition (Amendment) Ordinance, 1986. However, abuses regarding dowry continue, with the legal enforcement against dowry being weak.

=== Sexual harassment ===
"Eve teasing" is a euphemism used in South Asia for public sexual harassment (often known as "street harassment") of women by men. Examples include wolf-whistling, obscene gestures, threats of abduction, stalking, groping, and rubbing against women. Eve likely alludes to the first woman in the Biblical creation story. As of 2010, according to the Bangladesh National Women Lawyers' Association, nearly 90% of Bangladeshi girls aged 10–18 had been subjected to eve teasing.

HELP (which stands for the Harassment Elimination Literacy Programme) is a Bangladeshi mobile application. In a bid to enhance women's safety on public transport, the Broadcast Journalist Centre (BJC) and Switch Bangladesh Foundation have jointly launched an app-based service.

== Other concerns ==
=== Freedom of movement ===
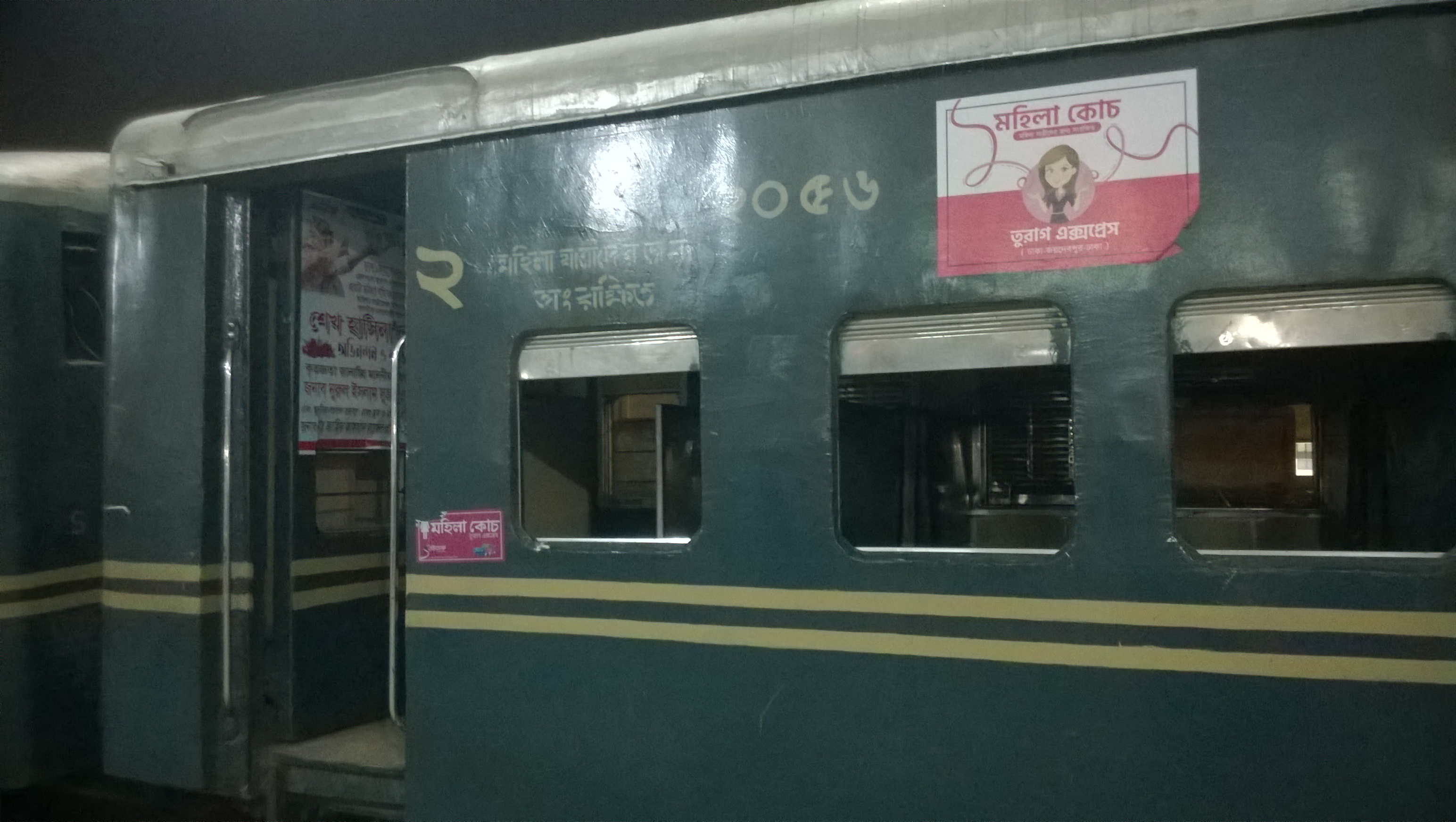
Bangladesh Railway female coach

Some urban Bangladeshi women have freedom of movement because of their financial position and social class, but many others are afforded significantly less liberty. Historically, the patriarchal society restricted rural women to their homes. Freedom to travel has improved, but most women are still confined to their village. All women still need their husband's permission to visit public spaces.

=== Health ===
The maternal mortality rate in Bangladesh is 240 deaths/100,000 live births (as of 2010). Sexually transmitted infections are relatively common, although the rate of HIV/AIDS is low. A 2014 study found that Bangladeshi women' knowledge about different diseases is very poor. Bangladesh has recently expanded training programs of midwives to improve reproductive health and outcomes.

=== Family planning ===
Already in the 1990s, family planning was recognised as very important in Bangladesh. The total fertility rate (TFR) is 2.45 children born/woman (estimates as of 2014).

== Gallery ==
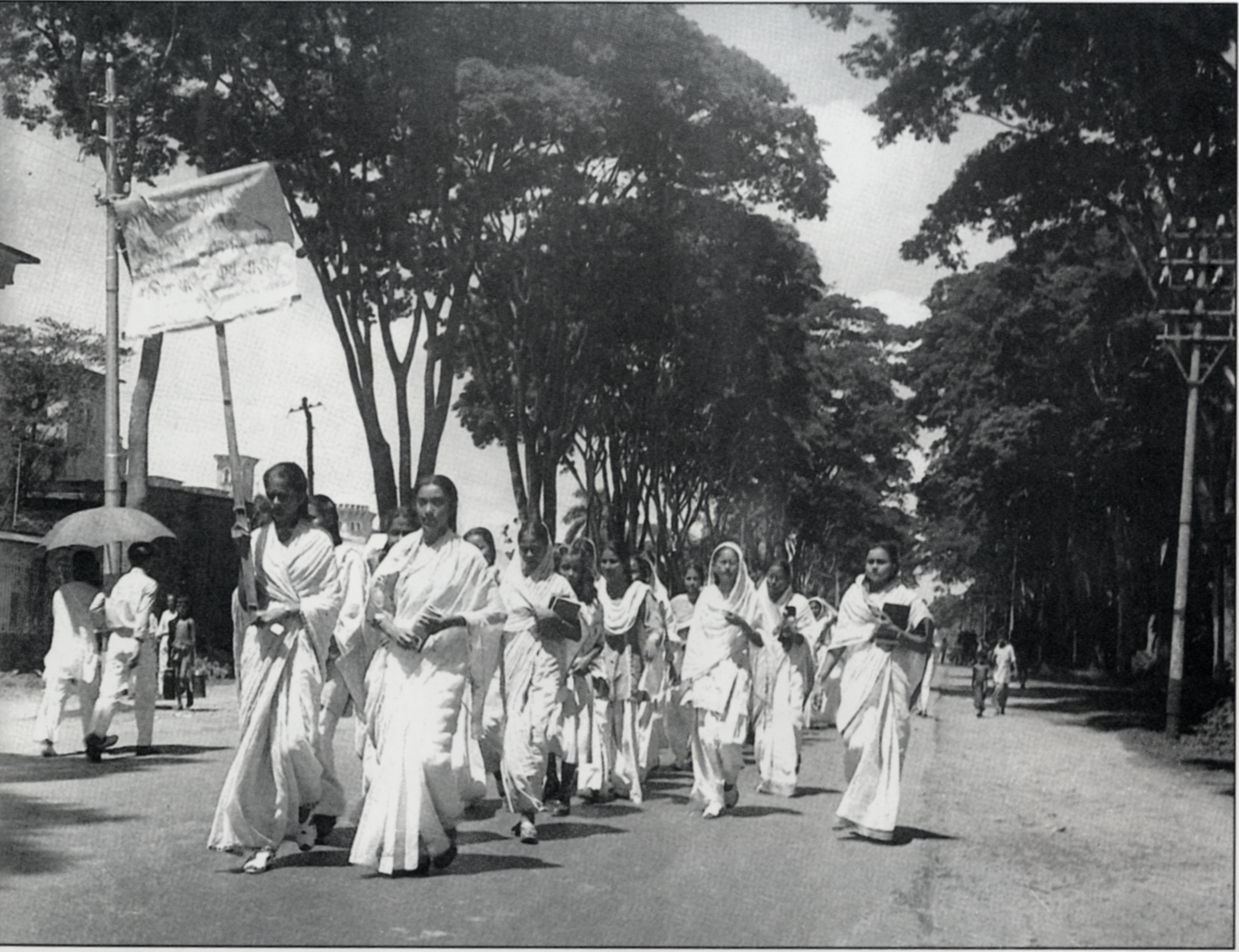
Bangladeshi women form up a rally at the first anniversary of Bengali language movement in Dhaka University in 1953.

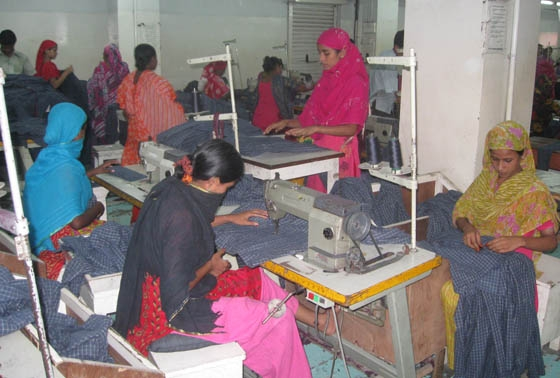
Women make up most of the workforce of Bangladesh's export oriented garment industry that makes the highest contribution to the country's economic growth.

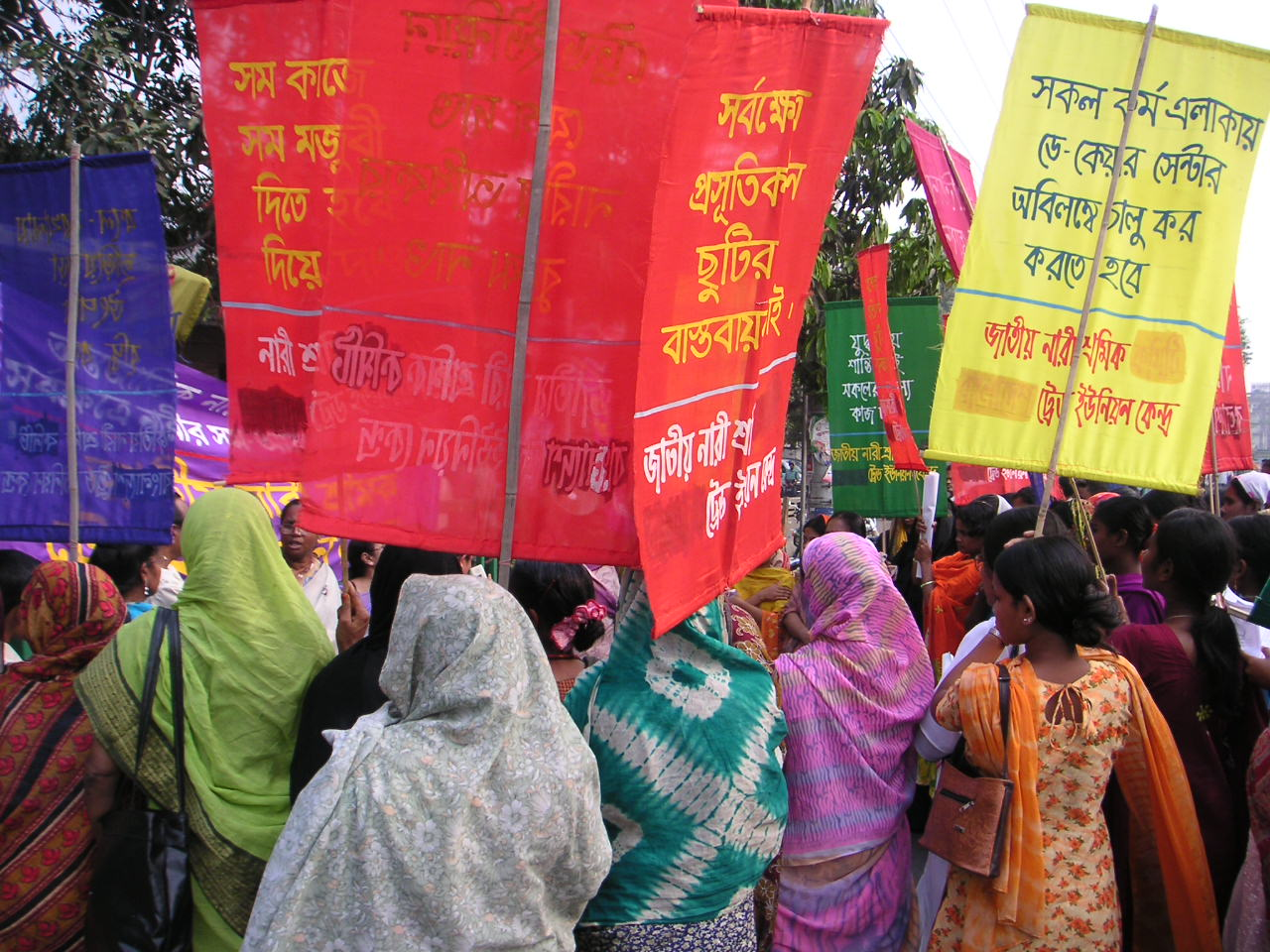
International Women's Day rally in Dhaka.

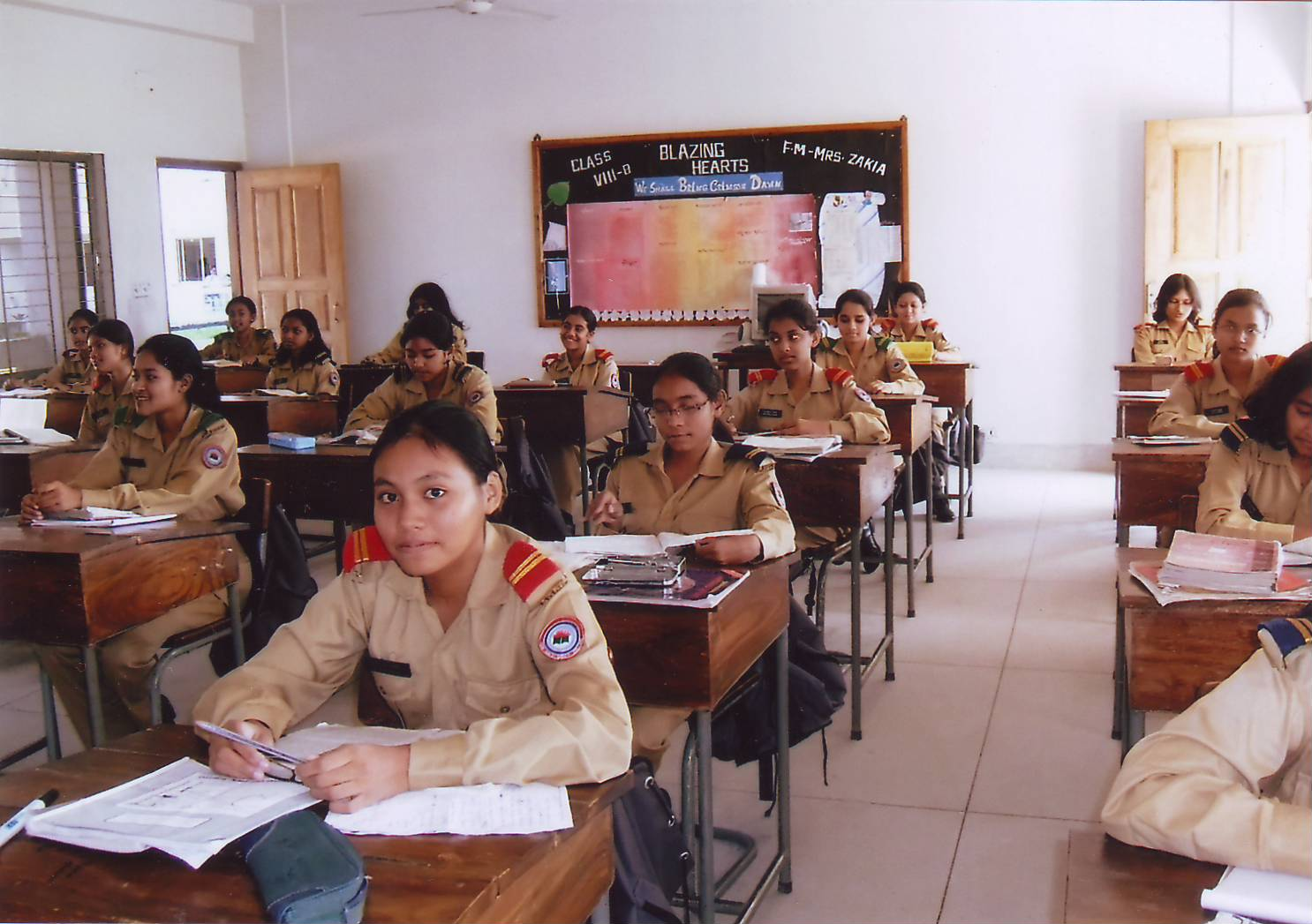
Bangladeshi girl cadets in Feni Girls Cadet College.

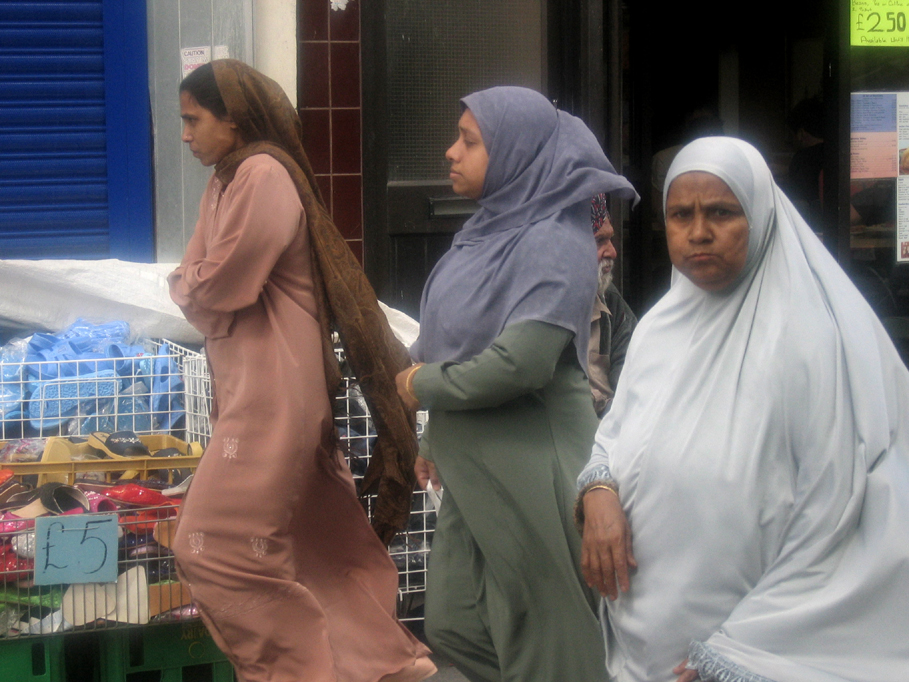
Bangladeshi women at Whitechapel, London. United Kingdom is home to one of the largest Bangladeshi communities outside Bangladesh and the largest outside Asia.

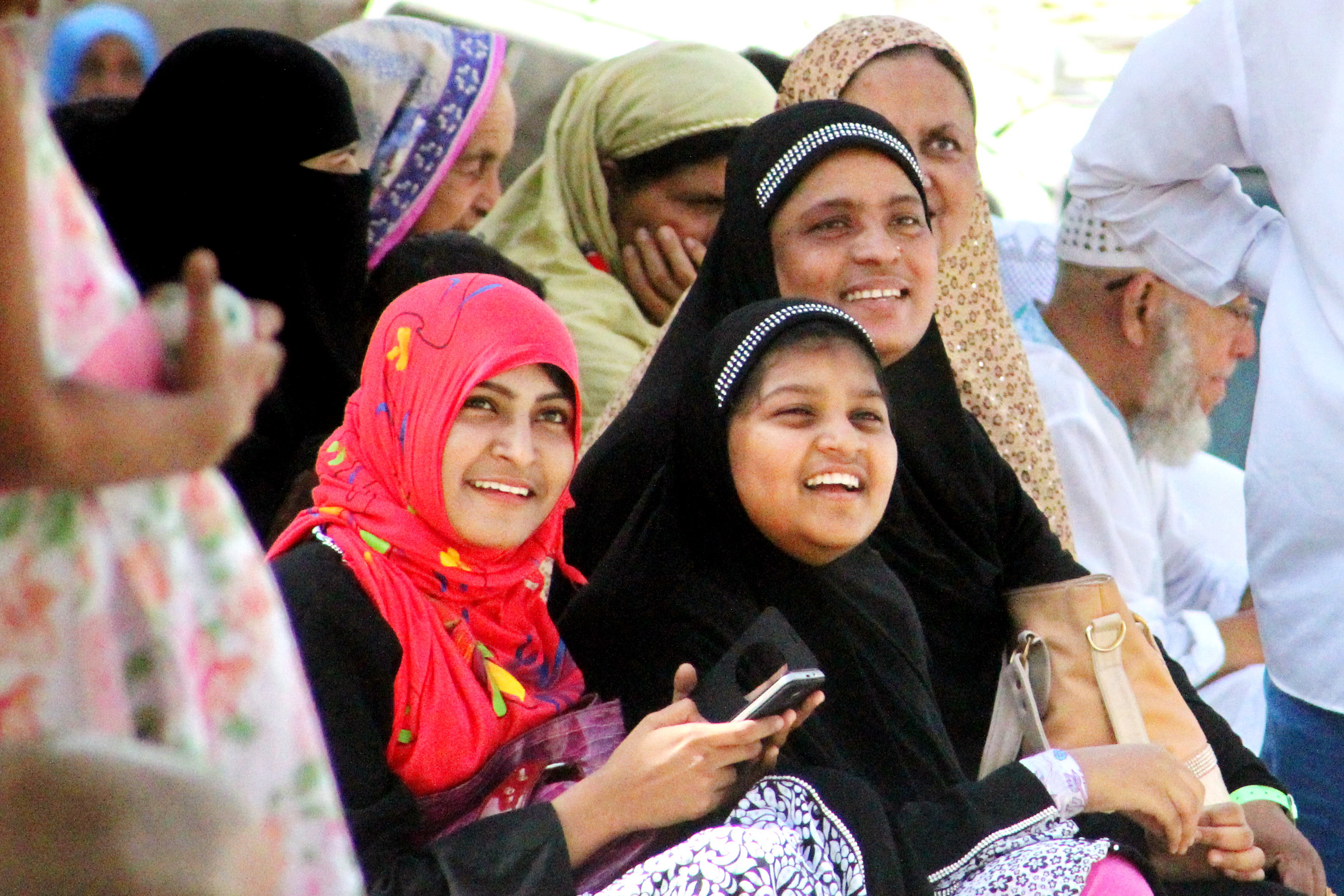
Female members of a Bangladeshi family seen at Jabal al-Noor, Makkah, Saudi Arabia. 3.5 million Bangladeshis in Saudi Arabia, mostly migrant workers and their family members in some cases, make up the largest Bangladeshi population outside Bangladesh (See Bangladeshis in the Middle East).

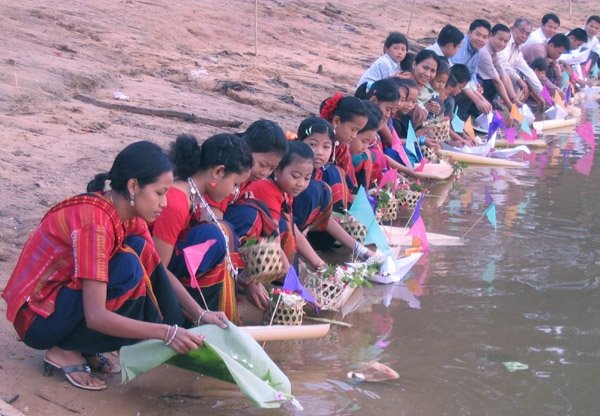
Bangladeshi women of the hill tracts.

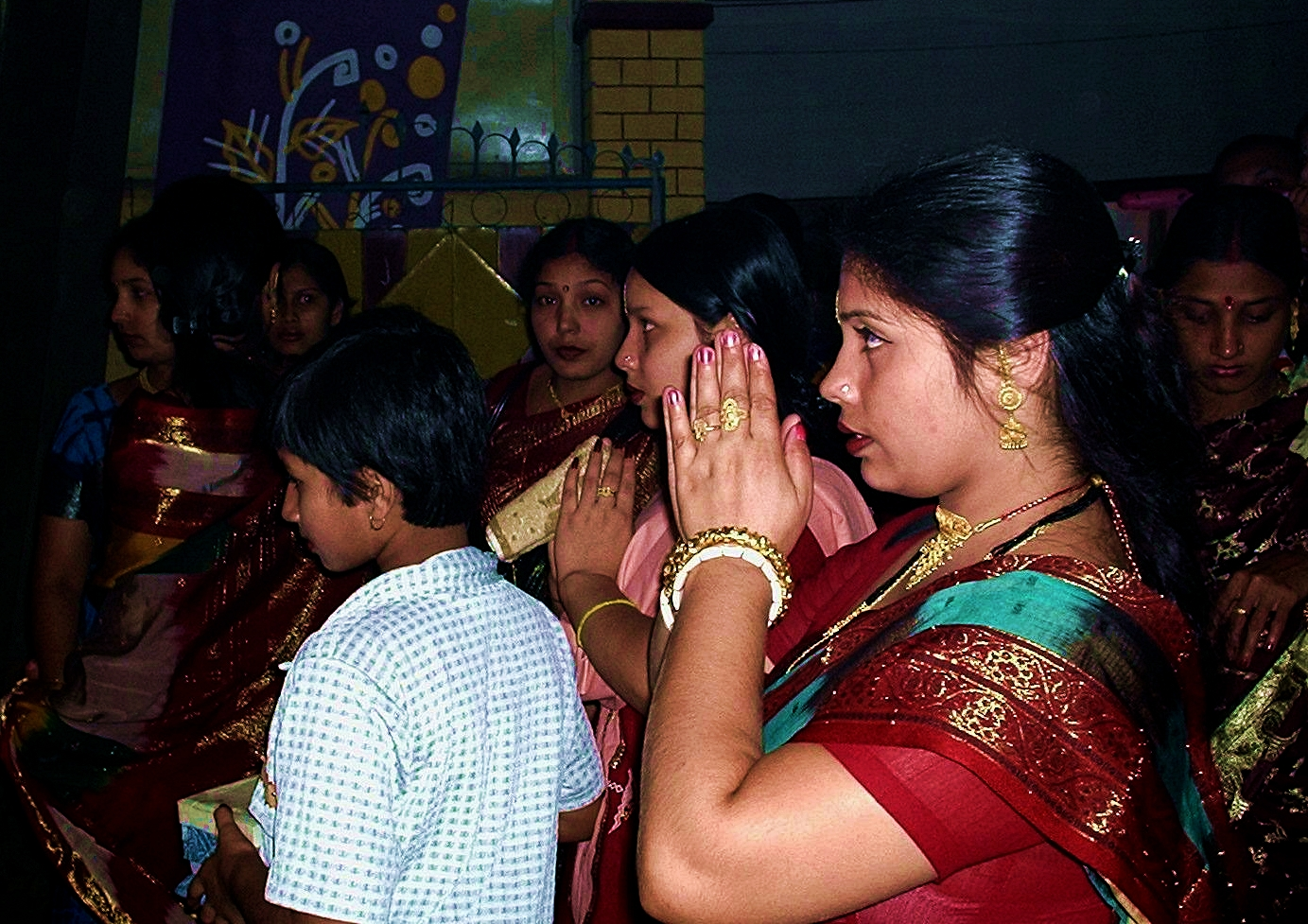
A Bangladeshi woman participating in Durga Puja.

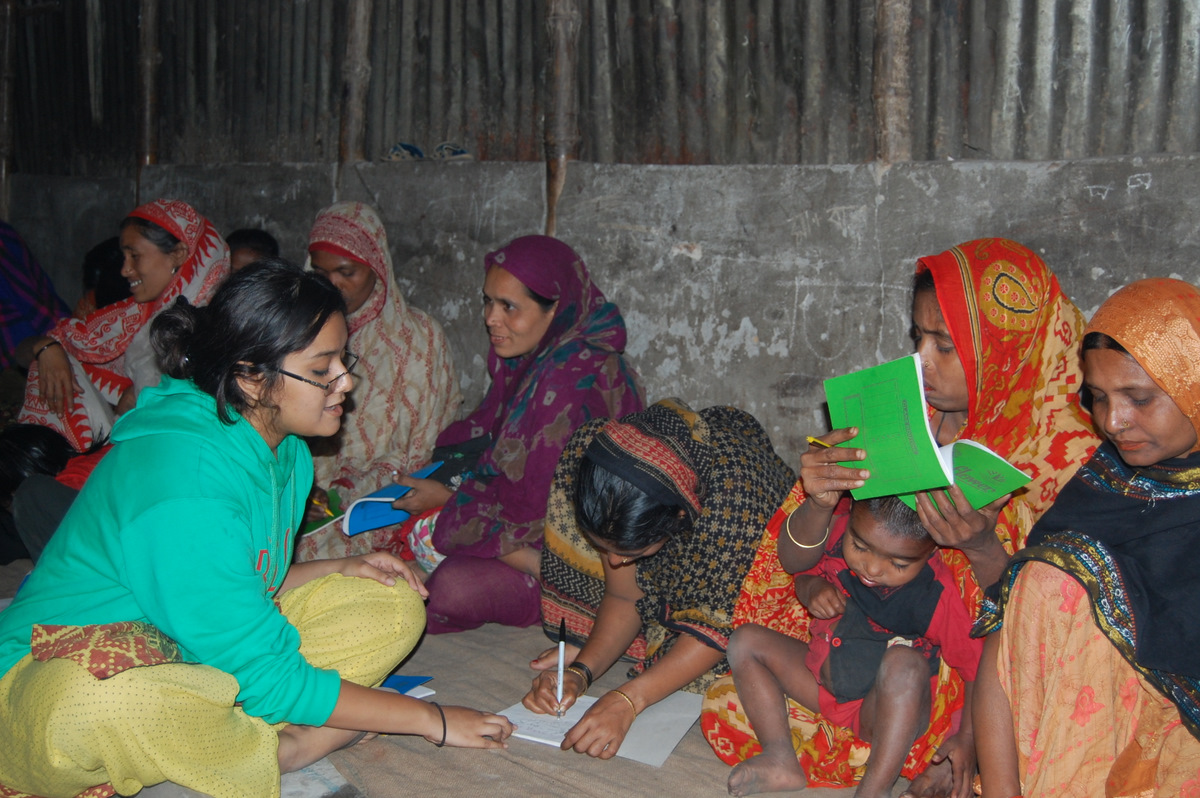
Bangladeshi women undergoing an adult education programme by Bangladesh Youth Leadership Centre.

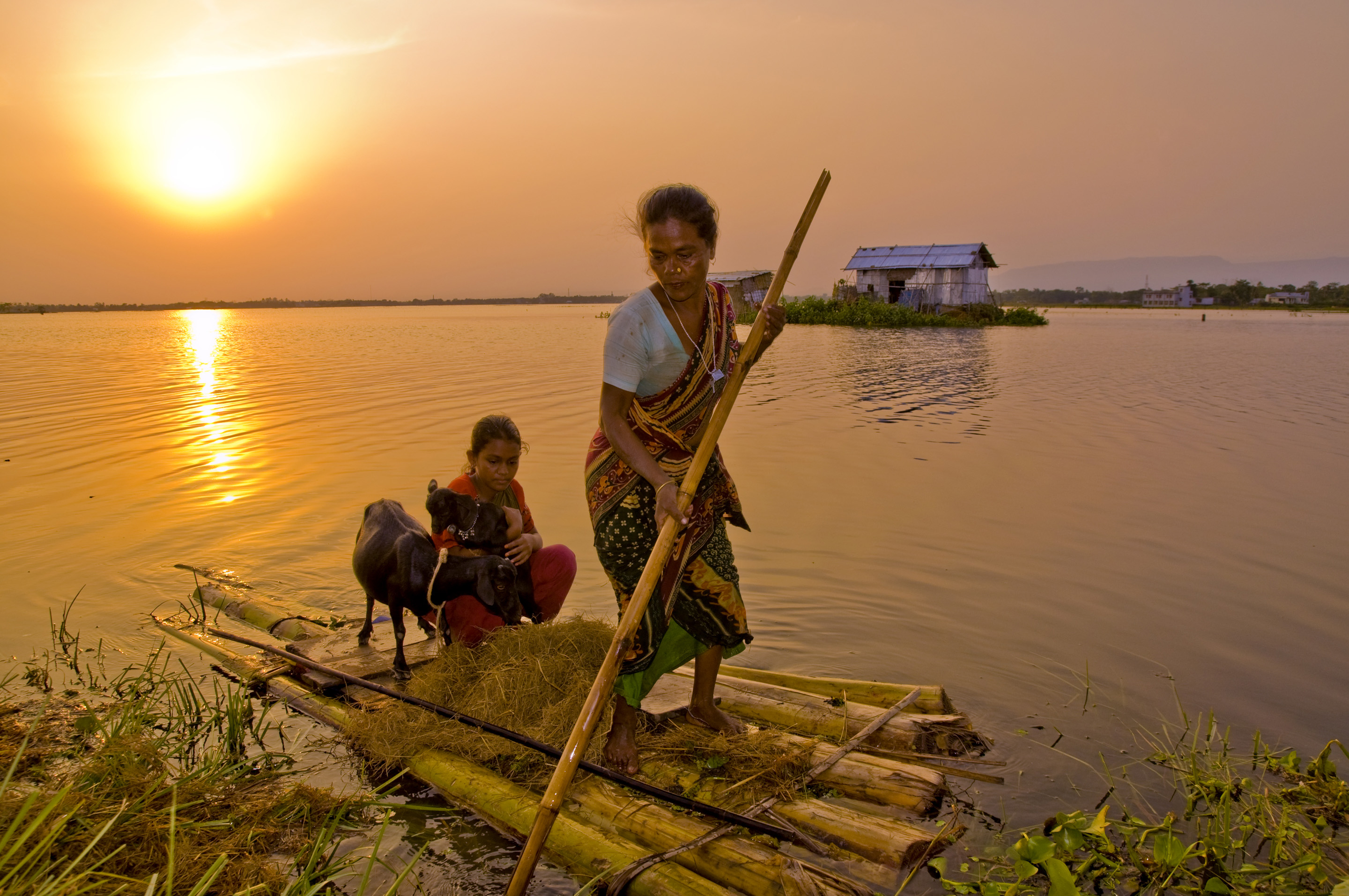
A women transporting a child and goats in a flooded part of the delta in Bangladesh.

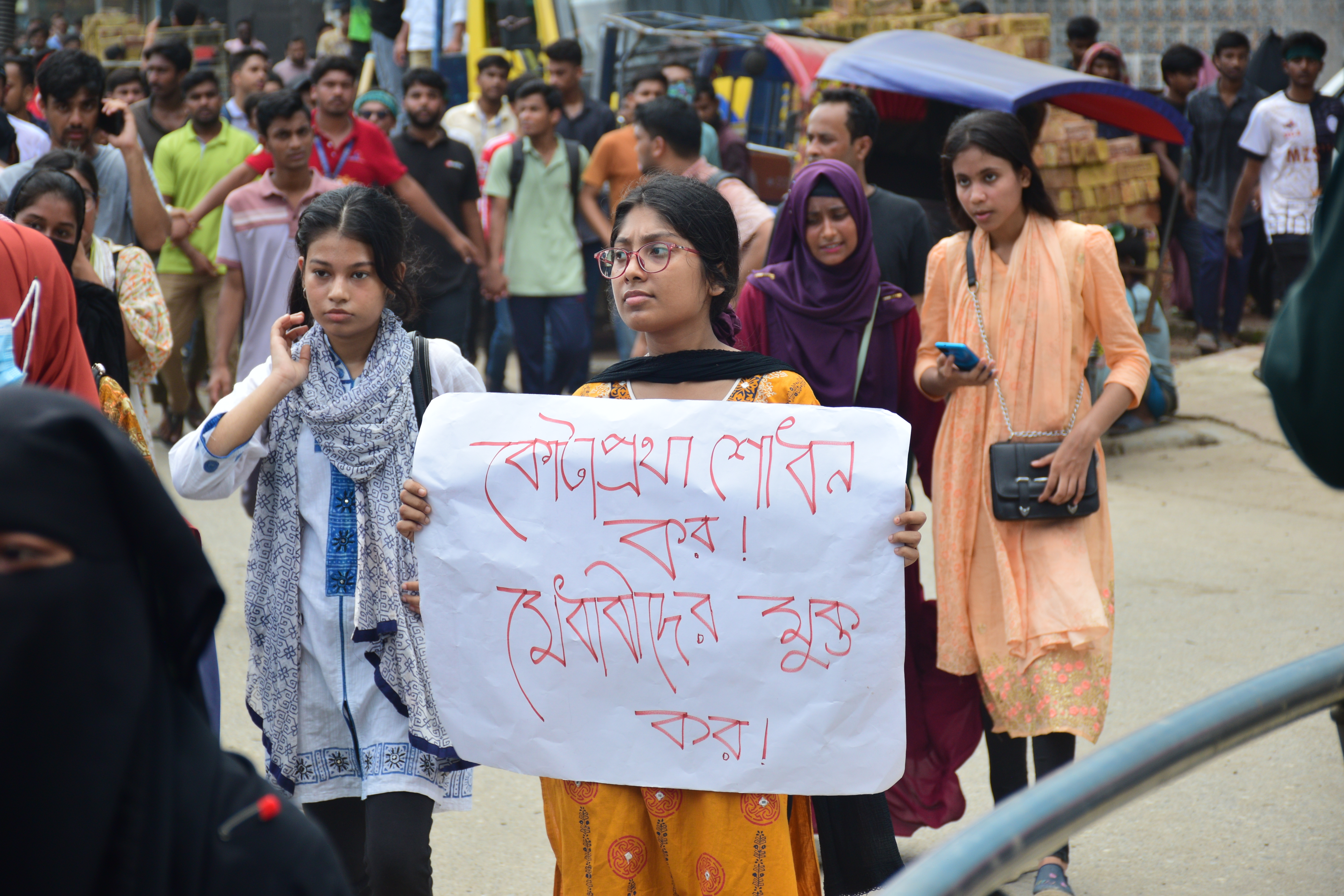
A women protesting at 2024 Bangladesh quota reform movement.

== See also ==
- Feminism in Bangladesh
- Gender inequality in Bangladesh
- Women in Asia
