= Charlotta Schlyter =

Swedish diplomat and Swedish Ambassador to Bangladesh

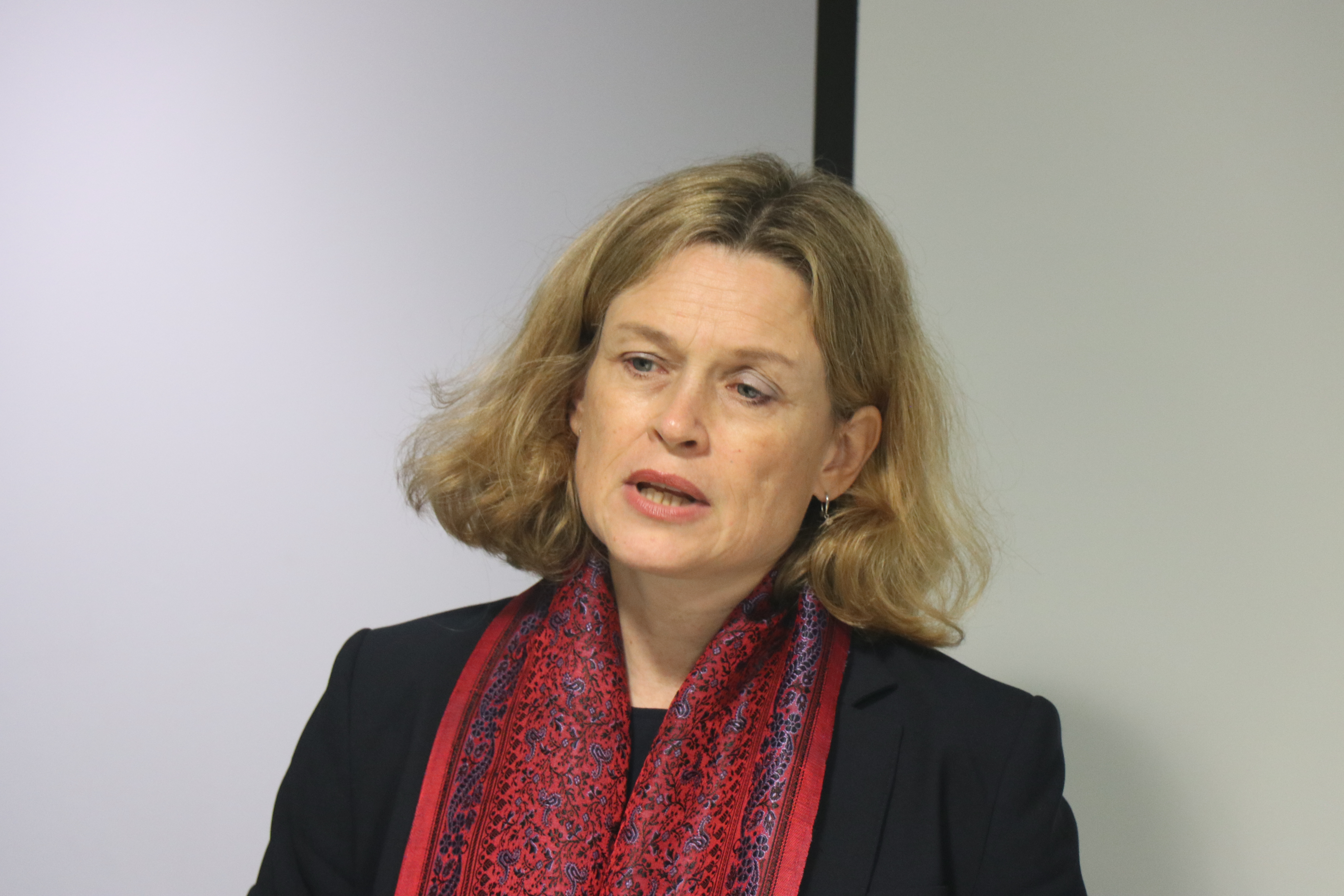

Ambassador of Sweden to Bangladesh
- In office September 2017 – Present
- Preceded by: Johan Frisell
- Succeeded by: Alexandra Berg von Linde

Deputy, Embassy of Sweden, Bangkok
- In office September 2015 – August 2015

Personal details
- Born: 15 April 1965 (age 61) Sweden
- Occupation: Diplomat

Charlotta Schlyter (born 15 April 1965) is a Swedish diplomat and was the Swedish Ambassador to Bangladesh from 2017 to 2020. She joined as ambassador of Sweden Embassy in Dhaka in September 2017. Before that she was the Deputy Head of Mission at the Swedish Embassy located in Bangkok.

== Early life ==
Schlyter graduated from the Stockholm University in 1984 in French language and literature. From 1985 to 1989, she studied law at Uppsala University. She obtained her master's degree in law from the University of Toronto in 1990.

== Career ==
Schlyter entered the Foreign Service in 1997. Slyter joined the Swedish Ministry of Foreign Affairs in 1997. In 2010 and 2011, she briefly worked at the Swedish embassies in Ottawa and Mexico City. From September 2001 to August 2015, she was head of the Human Rights and Social Affairs section of the European Union delegation to the United Nations. From August 2015 to September 2017, she was deputy head of mission at the Swedish embassy in Bangkok, Thailand, and in September 2017 she was appointed as Sweden's ambassador to Dhaka, succeeded by Alexandra Berg von Linde in 2020.

Diplomatic posts
Preceded by Johan Frisell	Ambassador of Sweden to Bangladesh; 2017–2020	Succeeded by Alexandra Berg von Linde
