= List of ambassadors of Sweden to Bangladesh =

Ambassador of Sweden to Bangladesh
- Lesser coat of arms of the Kingdom of Sweden

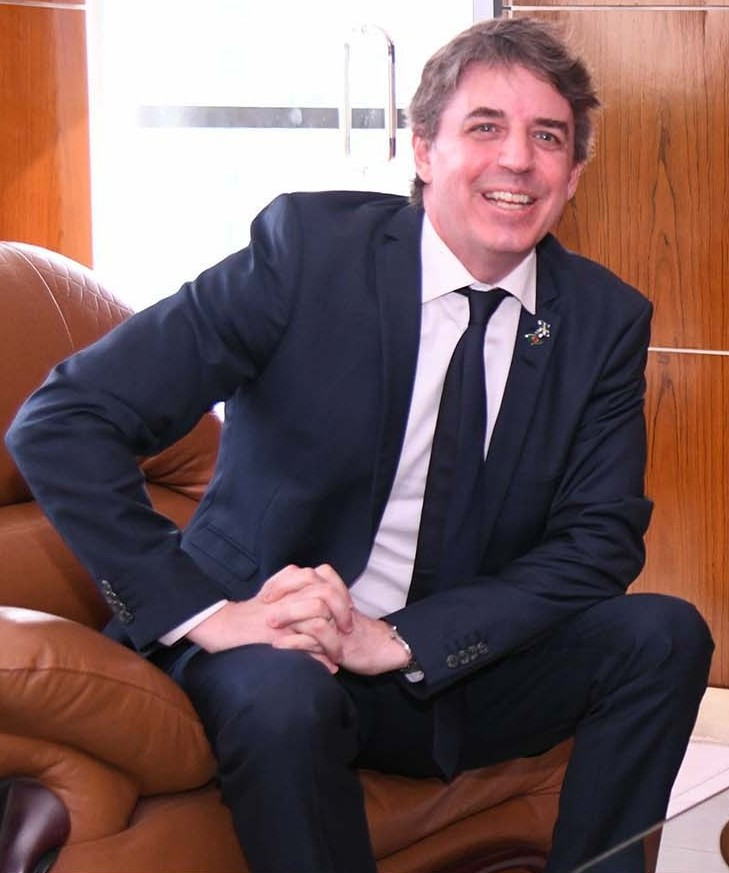
- Incumbent; Nicolas Weeks since 2024
- Ministry for Foreign Affairs; Swedish Embassy, Dhaka
- Style: His or Her Excellency (formal); Mr. or Madam Ambassador (informal)
- Reports to: Minister for Foreign Affairs
- Seat: Dhaka, Bangladesh
- Appointer: Government of Sweden
- Term length: No fixed term
- Formation: 1972
- First holder: Axel Lewenhaupt
- Website: Swedish Embassy, Dhaka

The Ambassador of Sweden to Bangladesh (known formally as the Ambassador of the Kingdom of Sweden to the People's Republic of Bangladesh) is the official representative of the government of Sweden to the president of Bangladesh and government of Bangladesh.

== History ==
Sweden recognized Bangladesh as an independent state on 4 February 1972. In a telegram to Bangladeshi Foreign Minister Abdus Samad Azad, Swedish Foreign Minister Krister Wickman expressed the government's wishes for success and emphasized that the Swedish government wished to establish diplomatic relations with the new state. That same year, Sweden's ambassador to India was also accredited to Bangladesh. Between 1972 and 1977, there was an embassy counsellor and chargé d'affaires stationed in Dhaka.

Sweden's first resident ambassador in Dhaka was Arne Lellki, who took office on 1 July 1977.

== List of representatives ==
Name	Period	Title	Resident / Concurrent accreditation	Notes	Presented credentials	Ref
Axel Lewenhaupt	1972–1975	Ambassador	Resident in New Delhi			
Hans Olwaeus	1972–1974	Chargé d'affaires ad interim (Note: He held the following diplomatic rank: Embassy Counselor)				
Lennart Finnmark	1975–1977	Ambassador	Resident in New Delhi			
Kjell Anneling	1975–1977	Chargé d'affaires ad interim		Acting in 1975		
Arne Lellki	1 July 1977 – 1981	Ambassador				
Peder Hammarskjöld	1981–1985	Ambassador				
Eva Heckscher	1985–1989	Ambassador				
Carl Olof Cederblad	1989–1992	Ambassador				
Björn Sternby	1992–1996	Ambassador				
Anders Johnson	1996–2001	Ambassador				
Börje Mattsson	2001–2005	Ambassador				
Britt Falkman Hagström	2005–2010	Ambassador				
Anneli Lindahl Kenny	2010–2014	Ambassador				
Johan Frisell	2014–2017	Ambassador				
Charlotta Schlyter	1 September 2017 – 2020	Ambassador				
Alexandra Berg von Linde	1 September 2020 – 2024	Ambassador			23 September 2020	
Jakob Etaat	2023–?	Chargé d'affaires				
Nicolas Weeks	2024–present	Ambassador			2 October 2024	

== Gallery ==
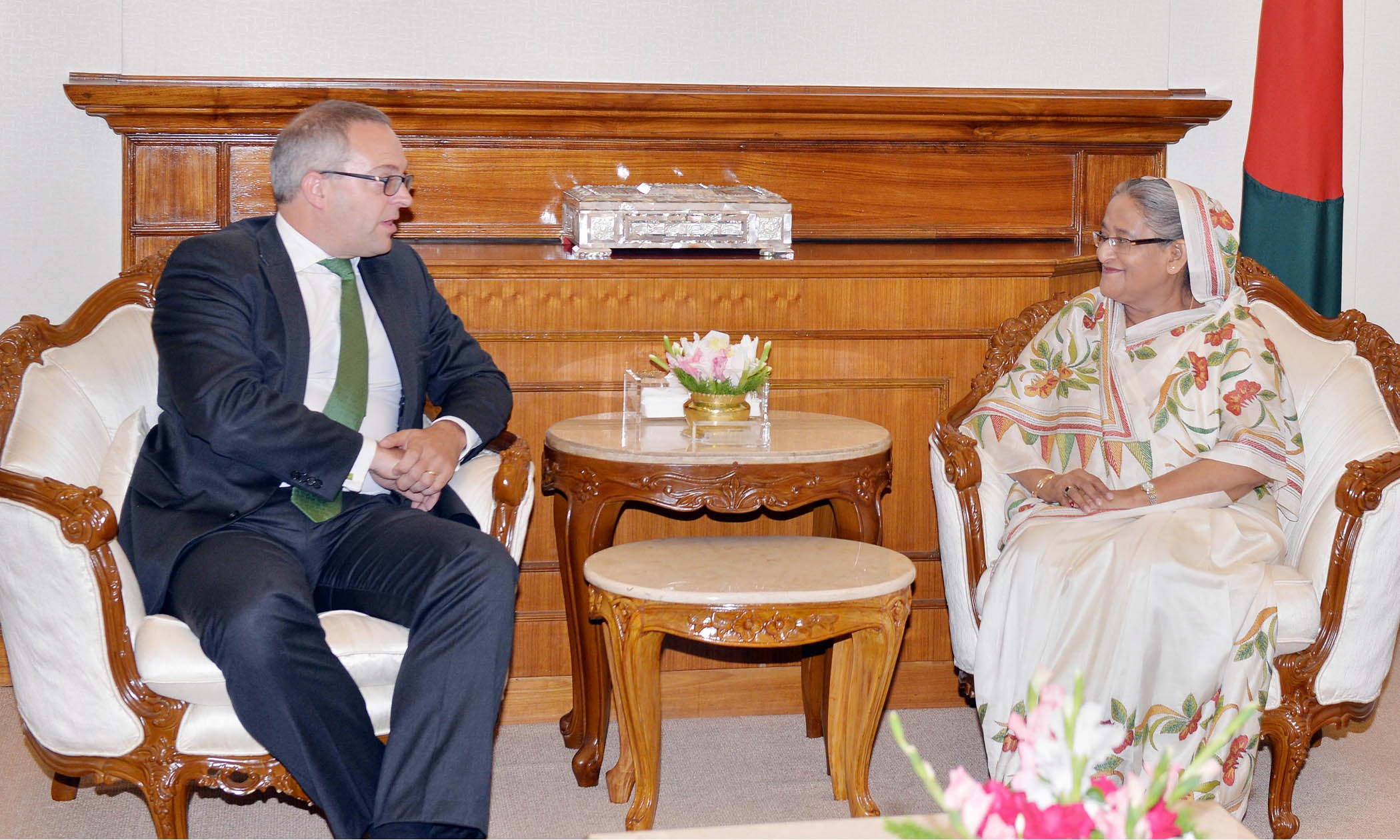
Ambassador Johan Frisell (2014–2017) and Prime Minister Sheikh Hasina

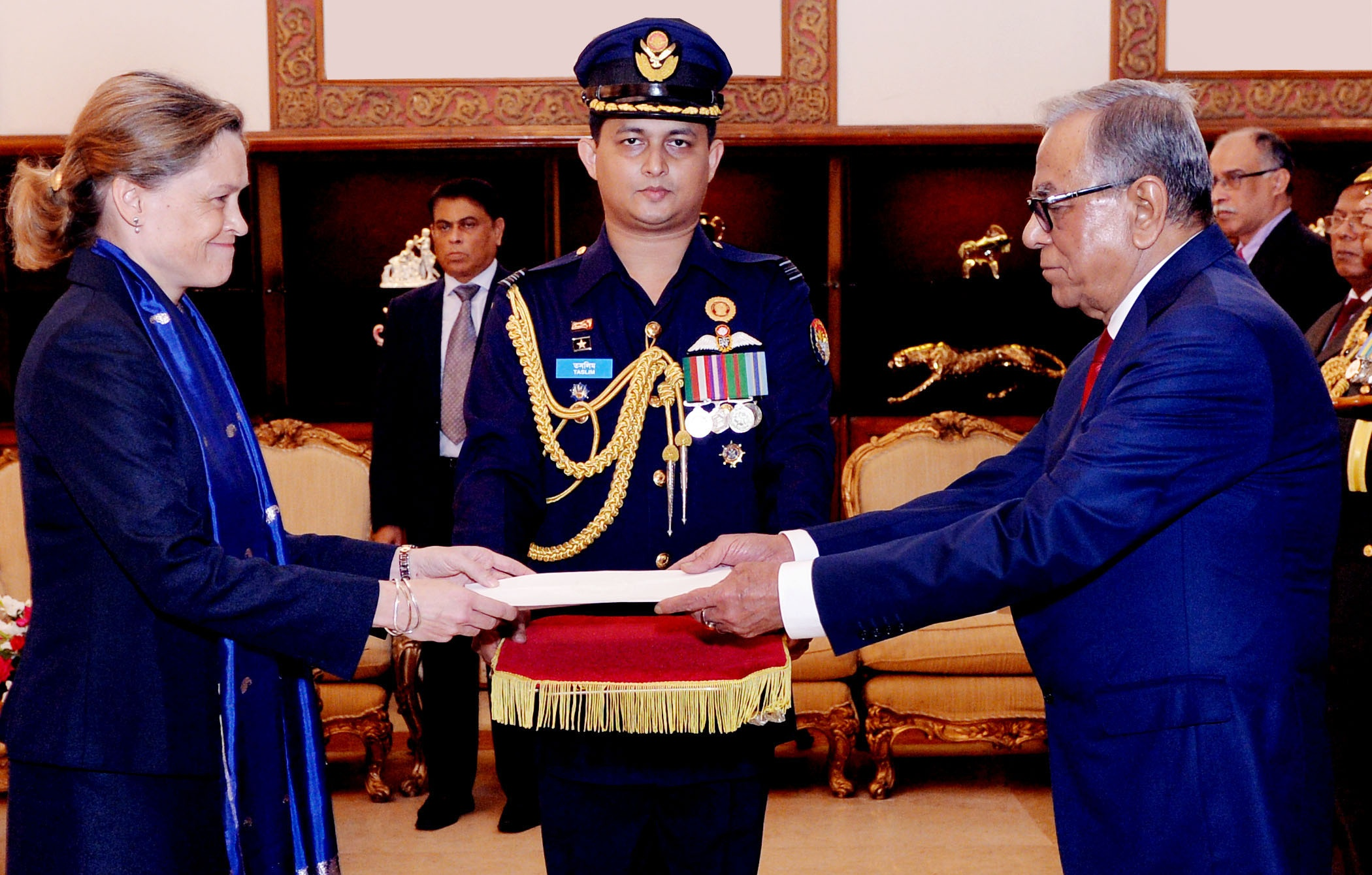
Ambassador Charlotta Schlyter (2017–2020) and President Mohammad Abdul Hamid

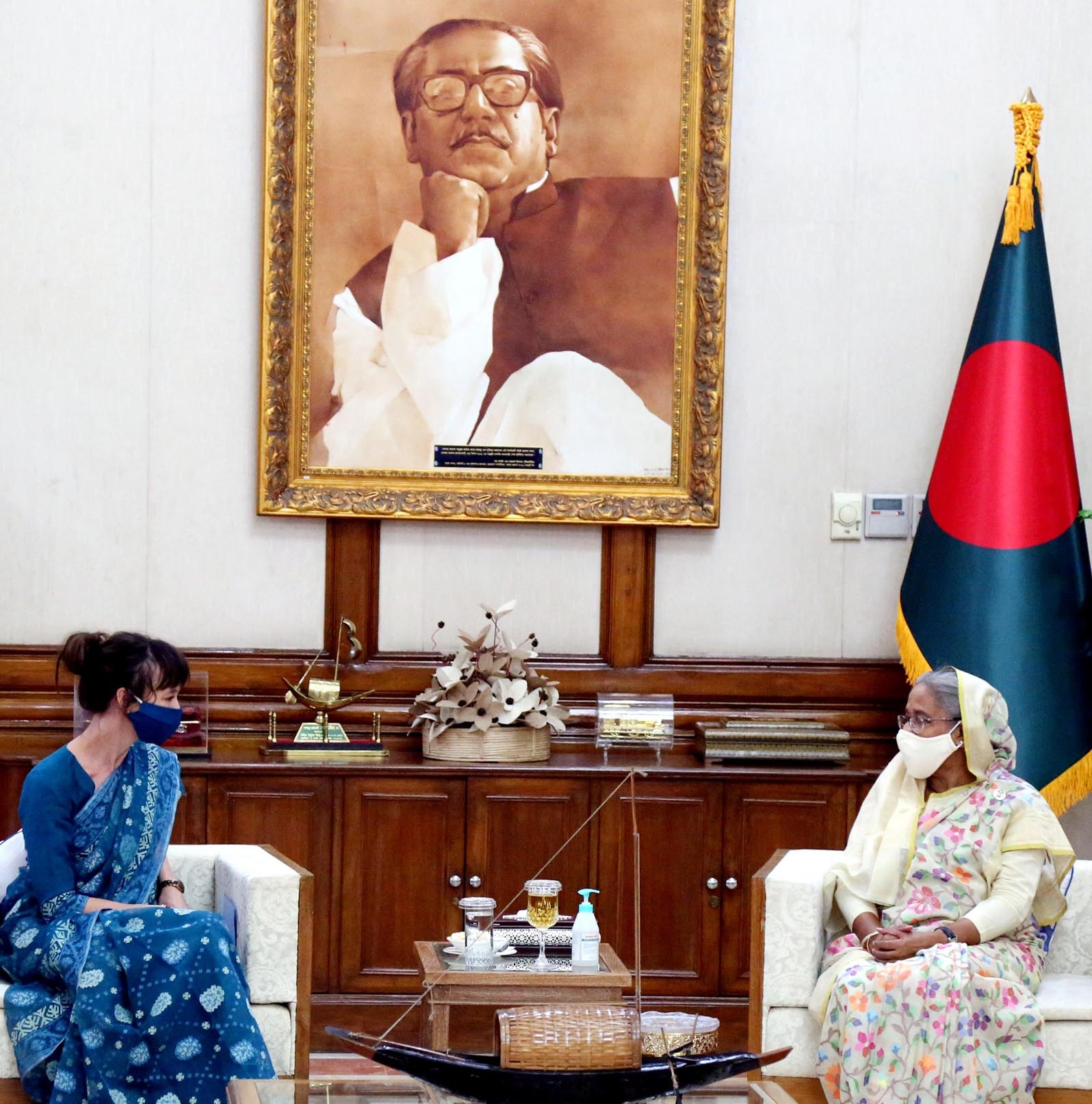
Ambassador Alexandra Berg von Linde (2020–2024) and Prime Minister Sheikh Hasina

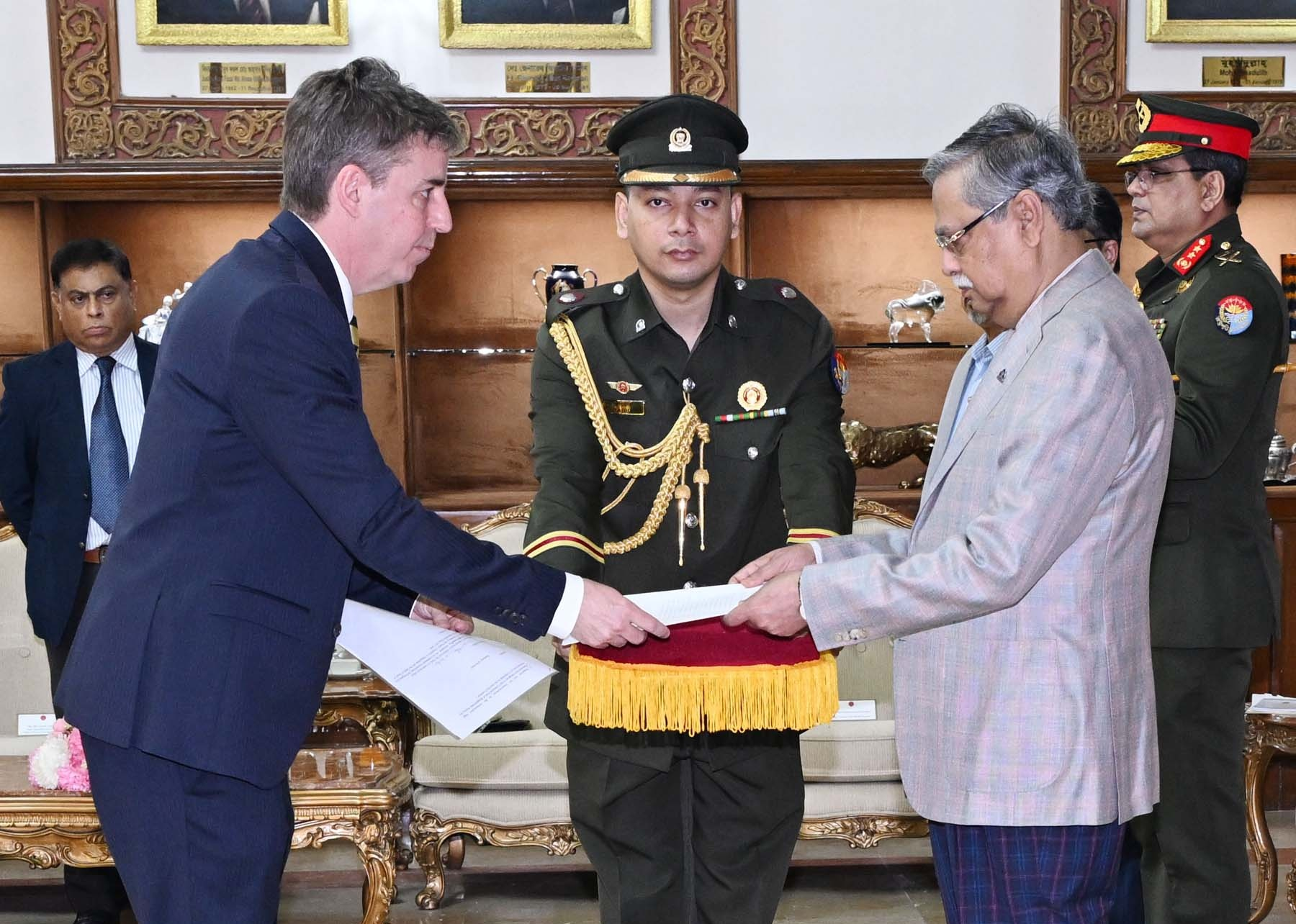
Ambassador Nicolas Weeks (2024–present) and President Mohammed Shahabuddin

== See also ==
- Bangladesh–Sweden relations
- Embassy of Sweden, Dhaka
