= Embassy of Sweden, Dhaka =

- Location: Dhaka
- Address: Bay's Edgewater, 6th Floor; Gulshan 2 Dhaka 1212; Bangladesh
- Coordinates: 23.7960°N 90.4178°E
- Opened: 1975
- Ambassador: Nicolas Weeks
- Jurisdiction: Bangladesh
- Website: Official website

The Embassy of Sweden in Dhaka is Sweden's diplomatic mission in Bangladesh. It is located in the Gulshan area of the capital. Along with Swedish visas, the embassy represents Schengen visas for Belgium, Finland, Iceland, Latvia, Luxembourg, Netherlands, Poland and Slovenia.

== History ==
Bangladesh declared independence in 1971 and Sweden, with its recognition on 4 February 1972, was one of the first countries to recognize the newly formed Bangladesh. In a telegram to Bangladeshi Foreign Minister Abdus Samad Azad, Swedish Foreign Minister Krister Wickman expressed the government's wishes for success and emphasized that the Swedish government wished to establish diplomatic relations with the new state.

The Swedish representation in Bangladesh was initially subordinated to the Swedish embassy in New Delhi. The Swedish embassy in Dhaka was opened in 1975. In January 1977 it was reported that the Swedish mission in Dhaka becomes an independent embassy. Arne Lellki, deputy director at the Ministry for Foreign Affairs, became ambassador at the new embassy on 1 July 1977.

In August 1994, it was reported that the Swedish embassy had received enhanced protection after approximately 500 Muslim students from the Bangladesh Islami Chattra Sena demonstrated. This protest occurred because the author Taslima Nasrin was allowed to leave Bangladesh and travel to Sweden instead of facing legal action for alleged blasphemy.

== Staff and tasks ==
=== Staff ===
As of March 2024, around 30 people (Swedish and local employees) worked in the following sections:

- Ambassador's Office: Includes the ambassador and the ambassador's secretary.
- Development Section: Handles development cooperation, environmental and climate change issues, humanitarian aid, economic development, democracy, human rights, gender equality, and health sectors.
- Political, Promotion, and Communication Section: Focuses on politics, business promotion, culture, communication, and press relations.
- Migration Section: Manages migration-related matters.
- Administrative and Consular Section: Oversees consular services, administrative tasks, logistics, and technical support.
- Transport and Office Support: Provides transport coordination and office assistance.

=== Tasks ===
The embassy represents Swedish interests in Bangladesh and works to promote bilateral relations between the two countries. Areas of cooperation include trade, development assistance, climate change and environmental issues, migration policy, refugee mitigation and housing, and cultural exchanges.

==== Activities and programs ====
Major areas of development cooperation by Sweden in Bangladesh focus on democracy, human rights, gender equality, health and education sectors. Swedish assistance also goes to programs supporting adaption to climate change effects, disaster risk reduction and renewable energy in Bangladesh. Trade between the two countries consists mainly of Bangladesh's exports of readymade garments to Sweden and Sweden's exports of telecom equipment, machinery and mechanical appliances to Bangladesh. The embassy provides consular services to Swedish citizens visiting or residing in Bangladesh. It also processes visa applications for Bangladeshi nationals traveling to Sweden.
