= Bangladesh Youth Leadership Center =

Youth center in Bangladesh

- Abbreviation: BYLC
- Formation: January 5, 2009; 17 years ago
- Founder: Ejaj Ahmad
- Type: Nonprofit organization
- Purpose: Leadership education
- Location: Dhaka, Bangladesh
- Website: bylc.org

Bangladesh Youth Leadership Center (BYLC) is the first leadership institution in Bangladesh. Originally developed at Harvard Kennedy School's Center for Public Leadership in 2008, the Bangladesh Youth Leadership Center was established in Bangladesh in 2009. The signature component of BYLC is the four-month-long youth leadership program, Building Bridges through Leadership Training (BBLT). Besides the BBLT program, BYLC also conducts programs and workshops for university students.

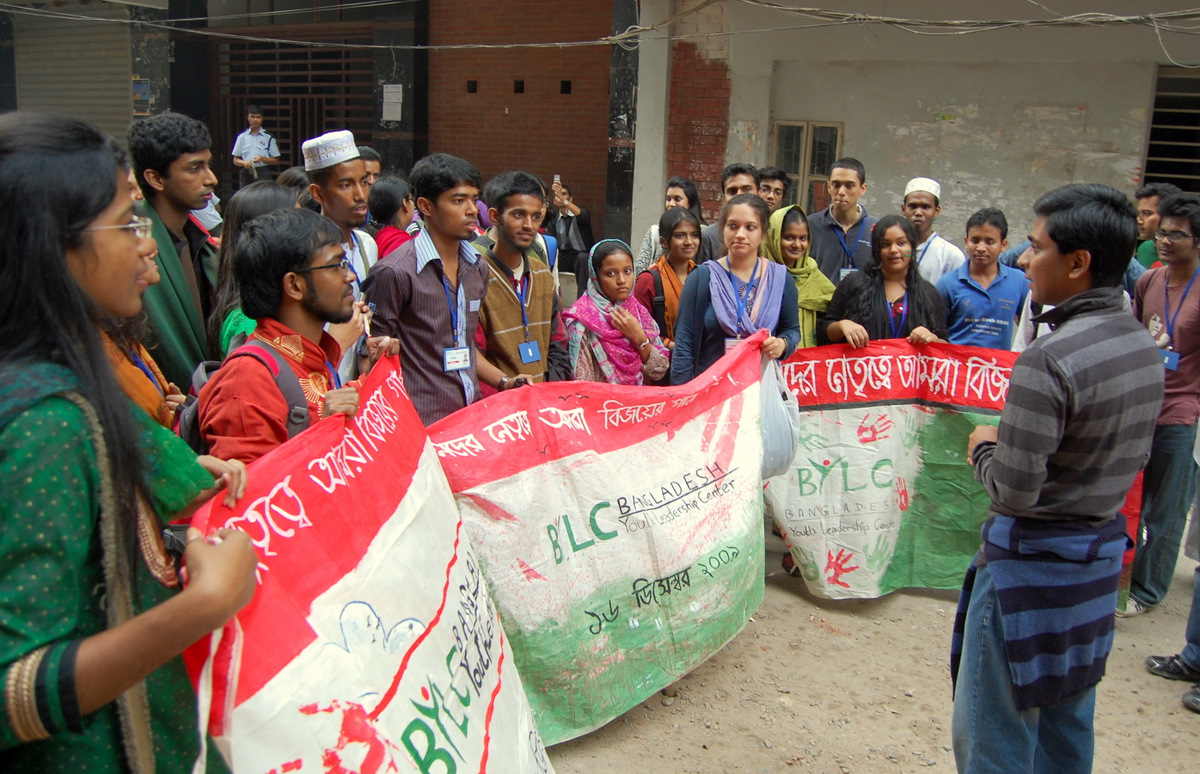
Ejaj Ahmad, founder and president of BYLC, speaks to students at the Victory Day Rally on December 16, 2009

== About ==
=== Formation ===
The concept of a youth leadership center was originally developed at Harvard University's Kennedy School of Government in January 2008. The proposal for a month-long leadership program, Building Bridges Through Leadership Training (BBLT), was jointly developed by Ejaj Ahmad, then a graduate student at Harvard University, and Shammi S. Quddus, then an undergraduate student at Massachusetts Institute of Technology (MIT). The proposal was one of a hundred college projects awarded a grant by Projects for Peace in 2008.

Ahmad and Quddus ran the pilot phase of BBLT in Chittagong in the summer of 2008, with technical and financial support from the Massachusetts Institute of Technology (MIT) Public Service Center. Building on the success and lessons learned from the pilot, the BBLT program was encapsulated within the framework of a non-profit organization, the Bangladesh Youth Leadership Center (BYLC).

In early 2009, BYLC was registered with the Registrar of Joint Stock Companies and Firms in Bangladesh as a non-partisan social venture.

The signature program of BYLC, BBLT, expanded into a four-month program for BBLT 4 in July 2010. The first month consists of intensive classroom training in leadership skills after school. In the next three months, students work in teams to implement their leadership training by designing and conducting community projects in local slums.

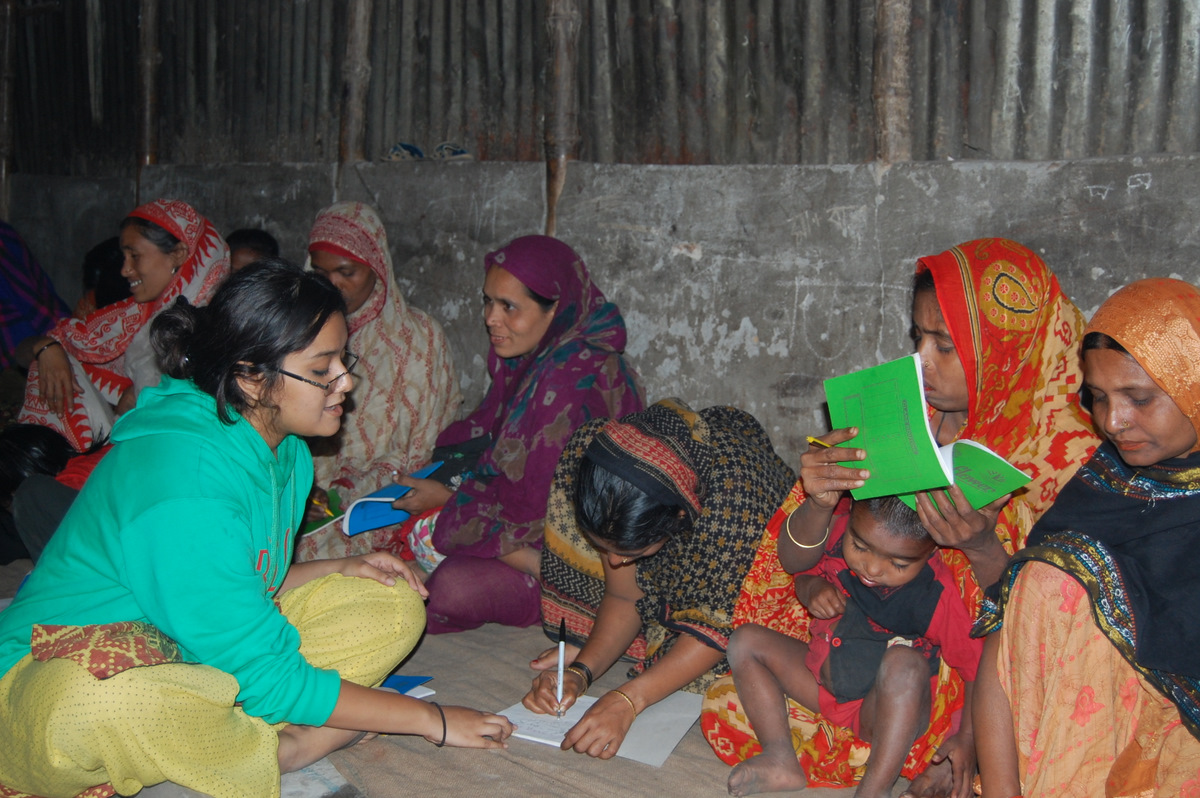
BYLC program participant Tasfia teaches the alphabet to an underprivileged woman in Korail slum in Dhaka

== Activities ==
=== Office of Professional Development ===
The Office of Professional Development (OPD), a key unit of the Bangladesh Youth Leadership Center (BYLC), aims to provide students, fresh graduates, and young professionals with professional development training and placement services.

==== BYLC Ventures ====
BYLC Ventures funds early-stage Bangladeshi founders, hones their leadership capabilities, strengthens their business acumen, and helps validate their ideas as they transition into investable businesses.

== Awards and recognition ==
In 2009, Ahmad was profiled as one of Asia's most promising young leaders and awarded the 2009–2010 Paragon Fellowship by the Foundation of Youth Social Enterprise. He was also among 20 outstanding young social entrepreneurs recognized by the International Youth Foundation (IYF) for the 2010 YouthActionNet Fellowship. The 2010 fellows came from 18 different countries across five continents. He was also featured in The Washington Post on a special program titled 'On Leadership: Ejaj Ahmad, bringing Obama to Bangladesh'. Assistant Secretary Robert O. Blake Jr. of the Bureau of South and Central Asia Affairs in the US government mentioned the Bangladesh Youth Leadership Center as one of "South Asia's Unheralded Stories" at the 2010 San Diego World Affairs Council. Ahmad was selected as one of the 150 delegates from Asia and the US in the 2010 Asia 21 Young Leaders Summit in Jakarta, Indonesia. In recognition of his work at BYLC, Ejaj Ahmad received an Ashoka Fellowship in 2016. Additionally, BYLC has received considerable media attention in Bangladesh via newspapers, radio, and press conferences.
