= Badrunnessa Ahmed =

Bangladeshi politician

Begum Badrunnessa Ahmad
- বেগম বদরুন্নেসা আহমেদ

State Minister for Women and Children Affairs
- In office 1973 – 25 May 1974
- Prime Minister: Sheikh Mujibur Rahman

Personal details
- Born: 3 March 1924
- Died: 25 May 1974 (aged 50)
- Spouse: Nuruddin Ahmad
- Relatives: Nasreen Ahmad (daughter)
- Education: Murari Chand College; University of Dhaka

Begum Badrunnessa Ahmad (3 March 1924 – 25 May 1974) was a Bangladeshi politician. She served as the State Minister for Women, Education, Sports and Cultural Affairs until her death in 1974.

== Early life and education ==
Ahmed was born on 3 March 1924. In 1947, she married Nuruddin Ahmad, an officer in the Forest Services in the British Raj government. She completed her bachelor's from Sylhet MC College in 1953. She completed her master's in education and political science from the University of Dhaka in 1961 and 1963 respectively.

== Career ==
In 1944, Ahmed joined the Managing Committee of Abdullah Suhrawardi Girls' School. She worked to prevent religious riots in Mirzapur street of Kolkata during the Kolkata 1946 riots on Direct Action Day. She moved to Gendaria, Dhaka, East Pakistan in 1951 after the Partition of India. She founded Gendaria Primary School and was a founding member of Bulbul Academy of Fine Arts. She was a member of the All Pakistan Women's Association. In 1960, Ahmed started her teaching career at Muslim Girls' High School. She also joined as the vice principal at Lalmatia Mohila College and retired as its principal in 1973.

Ahmed first became a member of parliament in the 1954 East Bengali legislative election as a nominee of the United Front party. In 1966, Ahmed became the founding chairperson of the women's wing of the Awami League party. She then founded the Gana Shanskritik Parishad. In 1970's general election, she was elected as a member of parliament as a nominee of Awami League.

== Death and legacy ==
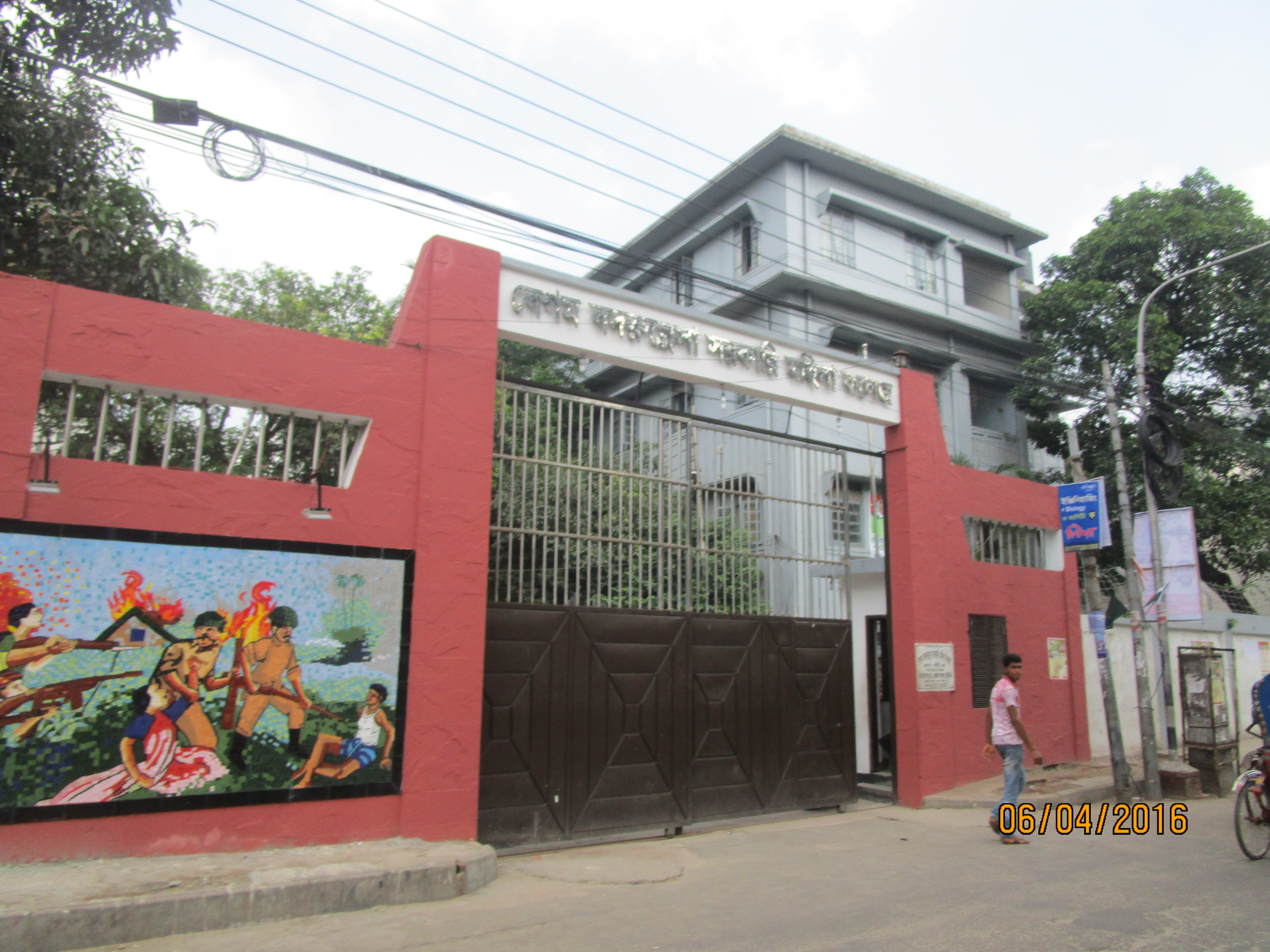
Begum Badrunnesa Govt. College was named after Ahmed

Ahmed died of cancer on 25 May 1974 in Dhaka at the age of 50. She was awarded the Independence Day Award in 1999 posthumously for her social work. She had a daughter, Nasreen Ahmad, who served as the pro-vice chancellor of the University of Dhaka.

After her death, the then Prime Minister Sheikh Mujibur Rahman changed the name of Bakshibazar Government Women's College to Begum Badrunnesa Government Girls' College after her name.
