= Shaheda Mustafiz =

- শাহেদা মুস্তাফিজ
- Known for: First female programmer of Bangladesh

Shaheda Mustafiz is a Bangladeshi programmer who is the first female programmer of Bangladesh.

She was a student of economics. After finishing her studies in Economics she had received training on Software Architecture in NCR Corporation of the United States. Mustafiz has become the Systems Manager on the Bangladesh branch of the company in 1976. She has worked in Leeds Corporation too. She has become the executive director of Probiti Systems Limited in 1998. She has also worked as the Canada's 20-20 Technologies Incorporated's Executive Director of Bangladesh branch and the United States's E-Techlogics Incorporated's Executive Vice President of Bangladesh branch. Besides, She is running Computer Training Institute for the women and child and working as an advisor of her next generation's software firm.
