= Gender inequality in Bangladesh =

Gender inequality in Bangladesh refers to the disparities between women and men in the country across economic, political, educational, and social spheres. While Bangladesh has made some progress since its independence in 1971, particularly in girls' education and, more recently, women's political representation, substantial gaps persist, and international bodies have characterized much of the remaining inequality as slow to close. On the World Economic Forum's Global Gender Gap Index, Bangladesh has consistently led South Asia for over a decade, ranking 24th of 148 economies in 2025; however, its standing has fluctuated sharply, having fallen to 99th in 2024 amid a deterioration in economic gender parity.

Economic participation remains the country's weakest dimension. In the 2024 index, Bangladesh recorded the lowest economic parity score of any country assessed, driven by low female labour-force participation, a widening income gap between women and men, and limited representation of women in senior and professional roles. Although the ready-made garment sector employs a large, predominantly female workforce, women are concentrated in lower-paid production jobs, hold few senior positions, and earn substantially less than men on average.

Bangladesh is one of the worst countries in the world to be a woman. A 2024 national survey by the Bangladesh Bureau of Statistics found that roughly 70% of women had experienced intimate partner violence at least once in their lifetime, with 41% reporting such violence within the previous year. Bangladesh also has the highest rate of child marriage in South Asia, with an estimated 47–51% of young women married before the age of 18, a practice linked to adolescent pregnancy, restricted education, and heightened exposure to violence. Sexual violence is widespread in rural and traditional communities, with there being a strong and persistent rape culture within public institutions that leads to an atmosphere that discourages reports of sexual violence. UN agencies and human-rights bodies have noted that discriminatory provisions in family and criminal law, limited access to justice, and insufficient services for survivors continue to hinder efforts toward gender equality.

== Background ==
=== Legal status ===
Although the Constitution of Bangladesh states that women have equal footing with men in all spheres of public life, it also recognizes religious personal laws, which are considered unequal. Four significant events in the life of a woman: marriage; divorce; custody of children; and, inheritance rights are governed by personal laws.

=== Crimes ===
In recent years, several laws have been put in place to reduce the amount of violence against women and girls. Early in 2011, a Division Bench of the High Court Division of the Supreme Court ordered every incident of eve-teasing to be considered sexual harassment. It also ordered an amendment to the Prevention and of Repression on Women and Children Act of 2000 to include the act of stalking in its provisions. Other laws protecting Bangladeshi women include the Dowry Prohibition Act 1980.

=== The Convention on the Elimination of all forms of Discrimination Against Women (CEDAW) ===
In 1979, the United Nations General Assembly adopted CEDAW as an international bill of rights for women. It defines what constitutes discrimination against women and creates an agenda for states to end discrimination worldwide. States that ratify CEDAW are legally bound to put its provisions into practice and are obligated to submit national status reports every 4 years.

On 6 November 1984, Bangladesh ratified CEDAW with reservations on Articles 2, 13.1[a], 16.1[c], and [f] due to conflicts with Sharia law of Islam. Since ratification, Bangladesh has undergone milestone changes in gender equality. In 2009, a public interest litigation case brought by the Bangladesh National Women's Lawyers Association challenged the High Court to step in and take action as there was no national law against sexual harassment. CEDAW became the centre of the Court's deliberations, and particular interest in CEDAW's Article 11 on equality in employment and the CEDAW Committee's General Recommendation no. 19 on violence against women was given. Based on these principles, the Court issued sexual harassment guidelines for the whole country, which will remain when legislation is passed. Bangladesh has also used CEDAW to help attain gender parity in primary school enrollment and has as a goal for 2015, to eliminate all gender disparities in secondary education.

== Reverse sexism ==
=== Constitution ===
The article 28 (4) of constitution of Bangladesh allows the state to make special provision in favour of women. There is a group that supports affirmative action, arguing that it is a crucial component of equality, while the other faction believe it is reverse discrimination and question the effectiveness of affirmative action in reducing inequality.

=== Law ===
==== Rape ====
In Bangladesh, the legal definition of rape is specific. It is a gender-based crime committed exclusively by males against females, involving penile-vaginal non-consensual intercourse. Other forms of penetration, including anal or oral, and penetrations by objects, are not recognized as rape under the law.

Under Section 375 of the Penal Code, women cannot be tried as perpetrators of rape. Many scholars criticize traditional rape laws for only addressing penile-vaginal non-consensual intercourse, arguing that they overlook similar behaviors without logical justification.

==== Male rape ====
In the Bangladeshi legal system, male rape is not recognized as a crime. According to Section 375 of the Penal Code of 1860, only the rape of women by men is punishable. Although male children under the age of sixteen can seek justice under the Prevention of Violence against Women and Children Act of 2000, there is no legal recourse for adult male victims of rape.

Male victims can file a case under Section 377 of the Penal Code if they are raped by other men. However, this section pertains to unnatural offenses and was introduced during the British colonial period to impose Victorian values and condemn homosexuality. As a result, it does not adequately address male rape cases. In 2022, following a writ petition, the High Court Division of the Supreme Court of Bangladesh questioned why the definition of rape in the Bangladesh Penal Code had not been amended to provide legal protection for both male and female victims. No progress has been made on this issue since then.

=== Quotaism ===
Right after independence, the Bangladesh Civil Service initially had a 10% quota for women who were victims of the war. However, this quota faced backlash when it was increased to 30% and expanded to include all women in 1985. In 2018, the High Court abolished the quota due to a students' movement, but it was restored in June 2024. However, by July 2024, the quota was abolished again by the Appellate Division due to a mass uprising.

In 2019, the parliament passed a law stating that women would fulfill 60% of the teacher requirements for primary schools, while only 20% would be men. In 2022, the Supreme Court ruled that this provision was unconstitutional and questioned why the policy of appointing assistant teachers in government primary schools on a quota basis should not be abolished. However, no action was taken following this ruling. After a regime change, the interim government abolished the policy in 2025.

=== Education ===
In 1990, the Government of Bangladesh introduced a free tuition policy for female secondary school students. In 1994, the Female Secondary School Assistance Program was implemented. After the 2026 election, the new government announced that education for women would be free up to the undergraduate level; however, no similar initiative was proposed for men.

The number of male students is falling behind that of female students recently. Many attribute this trend to the female stipend program, while others believe that child labor, which predominantly affects boys, is to blame. Many boys drop out due to financial hardships and the costs of schooling, while some attribute their dropout rate to mobile phone addiction.

=== Reserved seats in Parliament ===
There are 50 reserved seats in the Jatiya Sangsad, which has increased the participation of women in parliament. Although 15 reserved seats were added to the Constitution in 1972 for a period of only ten years, this number has gradually increased to 50 and is set to remain until 2043. The reserved seats have been challenged multiple times in the Supreme Court as the members are not elected directly by voters. However, this system has remained in place.

== Employment ==
Labor force participation for females has been driven primarily by the growth of approved export industry jobs in textiles and the spread of micro financing operations by NGOs including the Grameen Bank. Women's participation in high skill, managerial, and government executive positions have increased only to a limited extent. Income inequalities between women and men are still existent in Bangladesh. The 2012 Human Development Report shows that in the small business sector, for every dollar earned by a male, women make 12 cents in comparison. Over time, however, gender earning gaps have decreased in favour of women. Despite the changes that have come with the demand for women in the export industry, women are generally unseen outside the domestic sphere. This is especially true in rural Bangladesh. While labour force increase has accounted for higher percentages for females than males, terms of equality are measured in various areas beyond employment. Their status and position is also measured in terms of education, income, assets, health, and the role they play in the family and in society. These characteristics are representative of the amount of political power and social prestige a woman is accorded and thus the extent to which she can influence decision-making within the home and in the community.

=== Microcredit ===
Since the 1970s, microcredit institutions like Grameen Bank and BRAC have been pivotal in poverty alleviation in Bangladesh, reaching 59% of borrowers by 2005. The $2.1 billion industry offers collateral-free loans, primarily targeting women to empower families in a patriarchal society. While these initiatives align with Millennium Development Goals, they can also increase debt and financial instability. Issues such as rapid repayment demands and client poaching risk exacerbating poverty, as seen in the 2010 microcredit crisis in India. Additionally, husbands often control loans intended for women, limiting their financial independence and perpetuating inequality.

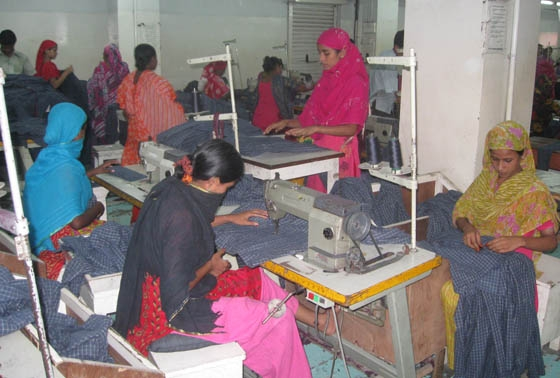
Garment workers in Bangladesh

=== Garment industry ===
The garment sector in Bangladesh represents 77% of total exports and is the largest industry in the country. Low wages and lax adherence to labor laws have led to highly competitive labor costs. Unmarried women from rural areas make up the majority of the workforce, as they are preferred over men in this sector.

Female workers encounter unique challenges, such as unsafe transportation, inadequate housing, and a hostile work environment. Sexual harassment and violence in the workplace are serious concerns, with 161 rape cases reported in 1998 by Dhaka Metropolitan Police.

== Health ==
In 2011, 24% of births were attended by a professional health physician. Sex selective health care and infanticide suggest a correlation between the number of females to males in Bangladesh. In Europe where men and women are given similar health care and nutrition, women outnumber men 105:100. In Bangladesh, that ratio is 95:100. In terms of the population, that ratio accounts for approximately 5 million missing women. Economist Amartya Sen argues that this low ratio is primarily due to insufficient health care provided for young girls but nowadays NGOs are encouraging equal health care. He reported that men, followed by boys, is the largest group of people admitted into hospitals. Women family members are less likely to receive modern medical care and are generally recipients of traditional remedies.

The health situation for urban women is worse than that for rural women, especially those living in slums. The urban population living in the slum areas do not have adequate sanitation, water and health facilities which results in poor health.

== Political participation ==
Since the 1990s, women have become increasingly influential in the political arena. From 1991 to 2024, all the prime minister elections have been won by two female prime ministers, Sheikh Hasina and Khaleda Zia.

Despite these successes, there remain several factors that limit women's political participation. The political culture based on vengeance, distrust and corruption has ideological, political, religious and institutional dimensions that are rooted in the whole of society. The result is an institutionalisation of violence as a means of political expression. In 2007, 192 cases of women being attacked with acid were registered. Intimidation by conservative parties and religious and socio-cultural norms are used to cut down and intimidate women, limiting their rights to vote. High rates of illiteracy have also acted as limiting factors.

== Religion ==
90% of the Bangladesh population adheres to Islam. Veiling remains a domain of contestation in regards to whether it serves as a vehicle of empowerment or discrimination. While seen in Western discourse as restrictive of women's rights, some claim that burkas allow for better freedom of movement in Bangladesh.

== See also ==
- Bangladeshi society
- Women in Bangladesh
- Feminism in Bangladesh
- Education in Bangladesh
- Child marriage in Bangladesh
- Women in Islam
