= Bonhishikha =

Bonhishikha - unlearn gender
- Formation: 2010
- Founder: Tasaffy Hossain
- Purpose: "A Bangladesh-based feminist organisation, committed to promote gender equality across all spectrums"
- Headquarters: Dhaka, Bangladesh
- Leader: Tasaffy Hossain
- Website: unlearngender.com

Bonhishikha is a Dhaka, Bangladesh based, feminist not-for-profit organization which advocates for women's rights, gender equality and raise awareness of gender-based violence. Bonhishikha primarily uses theater and story telling as an educational tool to promote gender equity and facilitate dialogue. The organization also initiates and facilitates communication around important issues related to women's emancipation. Tasaffy Hossain, a freelance development professional, research worker and an advocate for gender rights, is the founder and coordinator of Bonhishikha.

== History ==
Bonhishikha was initially created under the banner of the V-Day movement in Dhaka in 2010, bringing the first staging of The Vagina Monologues to Bangladesh. The performance brings up many different taboos related to female sexuality, menstruation and pleasure. Following the success of the show, the group of volunteer organizers took on the name "Bonhishikha - unlearn gender" and shifted the focus away from the American play and towards local women's stories in Dhaka and Bangladesh.

The collection of local stories on domestic violence, child abuse and stories from the LGBT community led to the production of a stage show called It's a SHE Thing. Following It's a SHE thing, Bonhishikha produced another theater production titled Men don't TALK in 2016, which shared stories of men growing up in Dhaka. This show was led by men, exploring "masculine stereotypes, fatherhood, sexuality, emotional expression, depression, and failure as defined by manhood." They went on to produce more shows, such as Nari Nokkhotro in 2017, He Said She Said and an online show called Spectrum of Choice in 2020. Each of the shows are performances based on real stories the organization has collected of local experiences of oppression, domestic violence and misogyny. Hossain, the founder, has said that she believes education to be the essential tool that can help women break free from gender stereotypes and patriarchal norms.

Apart from the shows, Bonhishikha has been involved in a number of awareness raising campaigns such as on breast cancer and on sexual consent. Bonhishikha is also one of the members of Young Feminist Network, created by Global Platform Bangladesh, a sister concern of ActionAid.
