= Bangladesh National Women Lawyers' Association =

Lawyer's association based in Dhaka, Bangladesh

- Abbreviation: BNWLA
- Formation: 1979
- Purpose: Legal aid, Women's right
- Headquarters: Dhaka, Bangladesh
- Region served: Bangladesh
- Official language: Bengali

Bangladesh National Women Lawyers' Association (বাংলাদেশ জাতীয় মহিলা আইনজীবী সমিতি) is a lawyer's association based in Dhaka, Bangladesh. It was established in 1979. Its main goal is "to create equal opportunities and equal rights for every woman and child in the country." BNWLA has actively participated in women's rights movements and activism in Bangladesh with advocacy and litigation with a vision to establish rule of law and gender equality. It provides cost-free legal representation, counselling, and legal support to the victims and survivors of domestic violence, as well as regarding trafficking of persons, family disputes, and other human rights violations.

== Early history ==
During the early years, BNWLA's objective was centered around promoting female lawyers in Bangladesh. BNWLA was started by women lawyers as a professional association to capacitate women lawyers in Bangladesh and fight the discriminatory practices they faced. It is the local chapter of the International Federation of Women Lawyers (FIDA). Gradually, BNWLA expanded its operationalization in providing legal services to women who are victims of domestic violence, acid attack, human trafficking and other forms of gendered human rights violations across the country. The legal literacy programmes it conducted at the rural and the subdivisional level not only raised awareness among rural women on their legal rights, but also served as the sources for ideas for legal reform at the national level.

== Institutional structure ==
BNWLA operates by forming different cells to achieve their objectives and implement their plans. These cells include:

- Legal Aid Cell: provides voluntary support to victims with legal counselling, mediation, and litigation services.
- Research and Communication Cell: Conducts research, collects data, and undertakes surveys on women's issues and also publishes books and booklets on family, dowry, marriage, divorce and inheritance laws. It conducts media monitoring and generates statistics on violence against women for evidence-based advocacy.
- Investigation Wing: Undertakes investigation of rape, torture, murder, terrorism, land rights, deception, abduction, harassment, etc.
- Training Cell: Organizes training programs for law enforcing agncies. government stakeholders, and NGOs dealing with violence against women and children.

== Thematic approaches and strategies ==
BNWLA follows three thematic approaches in its operationalization: prevention, protection, and rehabilitation and reintegration. Specific strategies include:

- Advocacy for introducing and/or reforming laws and policies
- Rights-based prevention, protection, and integration support
- Enhancement of women lawyers' professional capacity

== Presidents include ==
- Sigma Huda (founding president)
- Fawzia Karim Firoze

== Legal advocacy ==
=== Domestic Violence Act, 2010 ===
Working along the Bangladesh Legal Aid and Services Trust (BLAST), Ain o Shalish Kendra (ASK), and other organizations, BNWLA contributed significantly to the formulation and approval of the Domestic Violence Act, 2010 in Bangladesh.

=== High Court directives on sexual harassment, 2009 ===
BNWLA filed a public interest litigation case requesting the High Court to order the government to pass legislation to prevent sexual harassment in the workplace. Based on this case, the Bangladesh High Court issued a Directive on Anti Sexual Harassment in Workplaces and Educational Institutes in 2009. This writ petition also later resulted in the legal and formal rejection of using the term "eve-teasing" to address all relevant activities, and required identification of them as sexual harassment instead.

== Other activities ==
BNWLA established a shelter home "Proshanti" in 1993 to provide shelter to women and children who survived trafficking, forced prostitution, and imprisonment. The organization facilitates the repatriation of women trafficked from Bangladesh and their rehabilitation.
