= Ingemar =

Ingemar is a given name. Notable people with the name include:

- Ingemar Andersson (1928–1992), Swedish sprint canoeist
- Ingemar Backman (born 1976), Swedish snowboarder and poker player
- Ingemar Burgström (1926–1951), Swedish boxer
- Ingemar Cox (born 2000), British academic
- Ingemar Dierickx (born 1952), Belgian economist
- Ingemar Düring (1903–1984), Swedish classical philologist
- Ingemar Eliasson (born 1939), Swedish politician
- Ingemar Erlandsson (1957–2022), Swedish footballer
- Ingemar Franzén (1927–1985), Swedish weightlifter
- Ingemar Hägglöf (1912–1995), Swedish diplomat
- Ingemar Haraldsson (1928–2004), Swedish footballer
- Ingemar Hedberg (1920–2019), Swedish canoeist
- Ingemar Hedenius (1908–1982), Swedish philosopher
- Ingemar Jernberg (born 1950), Swedish pole vaulter
- Ingemar Johansson (1932–2009), Swedish boxer
- Ingemar Johansson (race walker) (1924–2009), Swedish racewalker
- Ingemar Kihlström (born 1966), Swedish politician
- Ingemar Liljefors (1906–1981), Swedish musician
- Ingemar Lindh (1945–1997), Swedish theatre director and pedagogue
- Ingemar Linnéll (born 1954), Swedish handball player and coach
- Ingemar Lundquist (1921–2007), American inventor and mechanical engineer
- Ingemar Lundström (born 1941), Swedish physicist
- Ingemar Macarine (born 1976), Filipino swimmer and lawyer
- Ingemar Mundebo (1930–2018), Swedish politician
- Ingemar Nilsson (born 1956), Swedish politician
- Ingemar Odlander (1936–2014), Swedish journalist
- Ingemar Pousette (1926–2000), Swedish engineer and businessman
- Ingemar Ragnemalm (born 1962), Swedish computer programmer
- Ingemar Skogö (1949–2019), Swedish civil servant
- Ingemar Ståhl (1938–2014), Swedish economist
- Ingemar Stenmark (born 1956), Swedish alpine skier
- Ingemar Stjernberg (1933–2025), Swedish diplomat
- Ingemar Svensson (1929–2004), Swedish rower
- Ingemar Teever (born 1983), Estonian footballer
- Ingemar Vänerlöv (born 1944), Swedish politician
- Ingemar Walder (born 1978), Austrian snowboarder
- Ingemar Wikström (born 1953), Swedish table tennis player

== See also ==
- Ivar
