= History of rail transport in Liberia =

Topographic map depicting Liberia's railways. From the north: Nano River 1,067 mm (3 ft 6 in) gauge Bong 1,435 mm (4 ft 8 1/2 in) gauge Lamco 1,435 mm (4 ft 8 1/2 in) gauge.

The history of rail transport in Liberia began shortly after World War II, when the Freeport of Monrovia was completed, with limited rail access. It had been developed by American military forces.

Between 1951 and 1964 three long distance railway lines were constructed in Liberia, mainly for the transport of iron ore from mines to port facilities. Of about 487 km (303 mi) in total length, they were the Mano River Railway, the Lamco Railway, and the Bong Mine Railway, respectively.

All three of these lines were later closed down, the latter two due to the effects of the two Liberian Civil Wars (1989–1996 and 1999–2003). The Bong Mine Railway recommenced operations by 2003 and the Lamco Railway recommenced in 2011.

== Beginnings ==
In the 19th century, Liberia found it difficult to get foreign loans which made infrastructure projects almost impossible. Under the presidency of Edward James Roye, a plan was drawn up to find foreign capital to build a railway into the interior in 1871, but after Roye's assassination, the funds were directed elsewhere and the railway was never built. As early as the 1920s, the establishment of railways was envisaged as part of the economic development of Liberia's mineral resources. These railways would have been constructed by the British Liberian Development Company. The national bankruptcy of Liberia and the intervention of the U.S. firm Firestone Tire & Rubber Company foiled these plans.

During World War II, the United States began preparations for the exploitation of the iron ore deposits in Liberia. The main element of this investment process was the Freeport of Monrovia, which was opened in 1948 as the first deep sea port in the country with a rail connection.

== Mano River Railway ==
Liberia's first long distance railway was the 67 km (42 mi) long Mano River Railway. This was completed in 1951 and ran between Monrovia and a mining area in the Bomi Hills north of Tubmanburg. This was built and operated by the Liberia Mining Company (LMC).

In 1961 the line was extended north of Tubmanburg, by 80 km (50 mi), to Kongo on the Mano River, another mining area. This section of line was built and operated by the National Iron Ore Company (NIOC).

Extract from a Bong Mining Company history article: "Some more concentrated surveying into those ore-deposits lead to the first iron ore mine in Bomi Hills, where production began in 1951. Ten years later, the first ore from Mano River was loaded in Monrovia´s harbour. Both ore companies used the railroad that had been built by the Bomi Hills Mine and the same pier at the harbour."

Mining at Bomi Hills ceased in 1977. "Iron ore mining in Bomi Hills ended in 1977." The section of railway between Bomi Hills and Monrovia was taken over by the Liberian Government.

Mining at Mano River ceased around 1985 or 1989 (sources differ). "...an old mine employee called JP....explained that the mine had closed in 1985."

This railway was 3 ft 6 in (1,067 mm) gauge.

== Lamco Railway ==
The second railway line in the country was the 262 km (163 mi) long Lamco Railway. This was completed in 1963 and ran between a second iron ore loading port at Buchanan and the company mine in the Nimba Hills at Yekepa, near the Guinean border. This was built and operated by the Liberian-American-Swedish Minerals Company (LAMCO).

Extract from a Bong Mining Company history article: "It took just until 1963, when the first train with iron ore could travel over the newly built 300km long railroad connection to the coast, where the ore could be shipped in the newly constructed harbour of Bucchanan."

The Lamco Railway was built as a single track 1,435 mm (4 ft 8 1/2 in) standard gauge line, and had eight intermediate stations with passing loops. It was one of the first iron ore railways to be designed specifically for use by long trains, and to be fitted with modern aids to operation, including centrally controlled signalling. Trains on the Lamco Railway were normally made up of three 2,000 hp (1,491 kW) locomotives hauling ninety ore cars. When loaded, they carried a total of 10,530 long tons (11,794 short tons; 10,699 t) of ore. As at 1980, the maximum tonnage of ore carried was 13,000,000 long tons (14,560,000 short tons; 13,208,610 t) per annum, and the rolling stock fleet comprised 14 locomotives and 510 ore cars.

During the civil wars, mining activity was abandoned and the associated railway fell into disuse and was subsequently damaged.

Extract from memoirs by a Lamco locomotive driver: "Production was abandoned in 1992 and LAMCO surrendered their concession"

The line between Buchanan and Tokadeh was rebuilt by ArcelorMittal and reopened in 2011.

== Bong Mine Railway ==
In the 1960s, a German private investment group acquired a mining concession in the Bong Range area and founded the DELIMCO mining company. To transport the Bong Range iron ore to Monrovia for export, another railway line, which became known as the Bong Mining Railway, was constructed in 1964. It is also standard gauge, and is 78 km (48 mi) long.

Extracts from a Bong Mining Company history article: "The concentrator was placed in service in (by, in?) February of 1965 and the first shipload of concentrates was unloaded to Rhine River barges at Rotterdam, Holland, in June of the same year."

"At the end of May 1990, the Bong railroad became unsafe and Bong had to stop production on May 26, 1990"

In 2003 the private company GeoServices Inc. resumed traffic on the former BMC connecting railway.

== Effects of the civil wars ==
During the civil wars mining activities were abandoned and railway activity ceased.

After the end of the wars, limited activity recommenced at the Bong mines in 2003 and by 2007 regular passenger and freight trains were reported running. By 2009 the mines had passed to Union China who continue to operate to this day (2025) although rail activity has ceased.

Chinese construction crews worked on a renovation of the facilities, as China was interested in further developing Liberia's mineral resources. The Tubman Bridge, at 240 m (787 ft) in length the most important railway bridge in the country, was being reconstructed in 2011. It forms part of the Mano River Railway.

== See also ==
- History of Liberia
- Rail transport in Liberia
