= Ragnemalm =

Ragnemalm is a Swedish surname. Notable people with the surname include:

- Hans Ragnemalm (1940–2016), Swedish lawyer, judge, and professor emeritus of public law
- Ingemar Ragnemalm (fl. 1990s), Swedish computer programmer
