= Knut Richard Thyberg =

Swedish diplomat

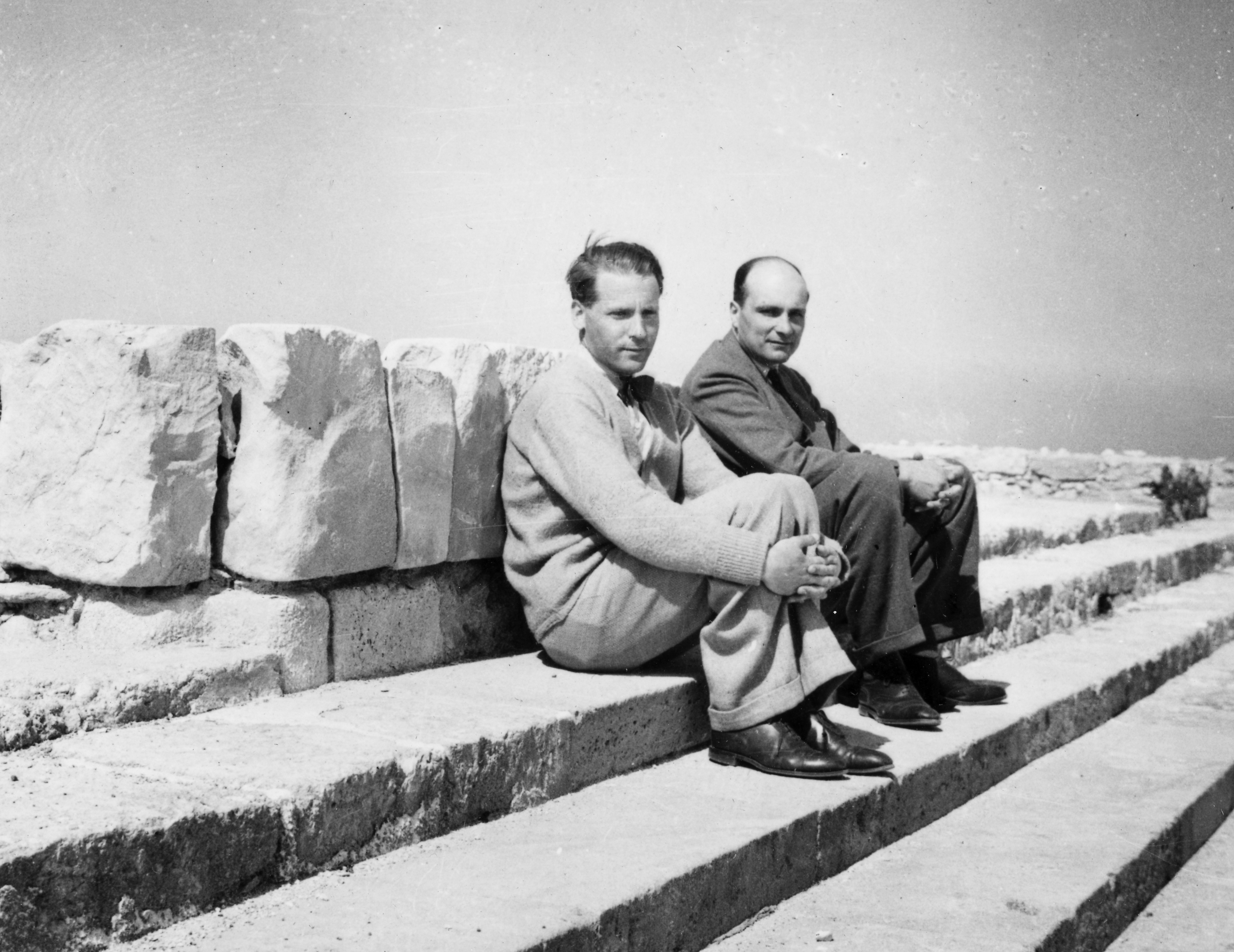
- Thyberg (right) together with Alfred Westholm in Cyprus six years after the Swedish Cyprus Expedition 1927–1931.
- Born: 6 November 1896; Sunne, Sweden
- Died: 1 April 1980 (aged 83); Zürich, Switzerland
- Education: Stockholm University College
- Occupation: Diplomat
- Years active: 1919–1961
- Spouse: Margaret Dows (m. 1925)
- Children: 3

Knut Richard Thyberg (6 November 1896 – 1 April 1980) was a Swedish diplomat. Thyberg held numerous diplomatic posts throughout his career, serving in cities such as Paris, London, New York City, Riga, and Prague during the 1920s and 1930s. He held senior roles in Copenhagen, Cairo, Belgrade, and Ankara before becoming director of the Political Department at Sweden's Foreign Ministry during World War II. From 1944 to 1948, he acted as Sweden’s envoy in Athens, where he helped represent multiple foreign interests and, with German cooperation, secured the release of around 50 Jews from captivity. He later served as Swedish envoy to Brazil and Portugal and was appointed Sweden’s first ambassador to Liberia in 1959, reflecting the country’s growing economic interests in Africa. Thyberg’s work in Liberia underscored the alignment of Swedish diplomacy with industrial expansion, particularly in support of the LAMCO mining syndicate. He retired from the foreign service in 1961.

== Early life ==
Thyberg was born on 6 November 1896 in Sunne, Sweden, the son of Edwin Thyberg, a merchant, and his wife Thyra (née Helin). He passed studentexamen in Karlstad in 1914 and became a reserve officer two years later in 1916. In 1918 he received a Candidate of Law degree in Stockholm and started working as an attaché at the Ministry for Foreign Affairs in Stockholm the year after.

== Career ==
Thyberg served in Paris in 1920, London in 1921, Antwerp in 1923 and in New York City in 1923. He was acting administrative officer in 1926 and second legation secretary in Riga with dual accreditation in 1928. He then served in London in 1929, Copenhagen in 1931 and was chargé d'affaires ad interim in Prague in 1931.

Thyberg served as first legation secretary in Copenhagen in 1933 and was chargé d'affaires ad interim in Cairo in 1936. He then served as legation counsellor in 1938 and was chargé d'affaires ad interim in Belgrade from 1938 to 1939 and in Ankara from 1940 to 1941. Thyberg was director of the Political Department at the Foreign Ministry in Stockholm from 1941 to 1944 and was minister plenipotentiary, chargé d'affaires and the Swedish government's agent for monitoring the Greece Commission's aid activities in Athens from 1944 to 1948.

Thyberg arrived in Greece in August 1944. As the Germans did not permit any foreign diplomatic representatives, Minister Thyberg initially held the title of Swedish Consul General and only gained full diplomatic status after Greece's liberation and the Germans' withdrawal in October 1944. At that time, apart from Minister Thyberg, the only remaining diplomatic and consular foreign personnel were the Swedish Consul Gösta Risberg, a former Spanish minister, and a Swiss former chargé d'affaires. Minister Thyberg conducted his official duties at the Dutch legation, whose interests Sweden represented. Furthermore, Sweden also looked after the interests of the Soviet Union and Argentina. During the activities associated with these protective missions, Minister Thyberg, thanks to a considerable level of understanding from SS General Walter Schimana, who was then the highest-ranking German military officer in Athens, managed to liberate around 50 Jews from captivity and return them to their homes.

Thyberg served as envoy in Rio de Janeiro from 1949 to 1955, envoy and ambassador in Lisbon from 1955 to 1959. In response to growing Swedish industrial interests in Liberia—especially the formation of the LAMCO Syndicate in 1955—Sweden’s Ministry for Foreign Affairs recognized the need for official diplomatic representation in Monrovia. Both government officials and business leaders agreed that representation was essential to support this major investment. As part of this initiative, Thyberg, then Swedish envoy to Lisbon, was appointed as Sweden’s representative in Liberia in 1958. Initially accredited with envoy status, Thyberg was later promoted to ambassador in 1959, becoming the first Swedish ambassador in sub-Saharan Africa. His appointment symbolized Sweden’s political support for its commercial interests in Liberia, particularly as large numbers of Swedish workers were expected to join the LAMCO project. Thyberg’s role thus reflected a close alignment between Swedish foreign policy and economic expansion abroad during the late 1950s.

Thyberg remained in the Swedish diplomatic service for two years before retiring in 1961.

== Personal life ==
On 3 October 1925, Thyberg married Margaret Dows (1906–1992), the daughter of Tracy Dows and Alice Olin Dows of Rhinebeck, New York, USA and sister of artist Olin Dows. The marriage took place at Foxhollow Farm in Rhinebeck, the country place of her parent. They had three children; ambassador Knut Thyberg (1926–2018), Birgitta (born 1928) and Peter Jan (born 1933).

== Death ==
Thyberg died on 1 April 1980 in Zürich, Switzerland. He was interred in the family grave at the Old Cemetery in his hometown of Sunne.

== Awards and decorations ==
- (Sweden) Commander 1st Class of the Order of the Polar Star
- (Portugal) Grand Cross of the Military Order of Christ (19 January 1960)
- (Brazil) Grand Cross of the Order of the Southern Cross
- (Greece) Grand Cross of the Order of the Phoenix
- Commander 1st Class of the Order of the Lion of Finland
- (Kingdom of Serbia) Grand Officer of the Order of St. Sava
- (Netherlands) Grand Officer of the Order of Orange-Nassau
- (Latvia) Officer of the Order of the Three Stars
- (Denmark) Knight of the Order of the Dannebrog
- (France) Officer of the Ordre des Palmes académiques

Diplomatic posts
Preceded by Gerhard Löwen as Envoy	Chargé d'affaires ad interim of Sweden to Czechoslovakia; 1931–1933	Succeeded by Joen Lagerberg as Chargé d'affaires ad interim
Preceded by Einar Modig as Envoy	Chargé d'affaires of Sweden to Greece; 1944–1948	Succeeded by Alexis Aminoff as Envoy
Preceded by Ragnar Kumlin	Envoy of Sweden to Brazil; 1949–1955	Succeeded by Jan Stenström
Preceded by Jan Stenström	Envoy/Ambassador of Sweden to Portugal; 1955–1959	Succeeded by Alexis Aminoff
Preceded by None	Envoy/Ambassador of Sweden to Liberia; 1958–1959	Succeeded by Alexis Aminoff
