= Ingemar Pousette =

Swedish engineer and businessman

Vilhelm Ingemar Sigurd Pousette (21 May 1926 – 17 December 2000) was a Swedish mining engineer and CEO.

== Biography ==
Ingemar Pousette was born in Solna parish in Stockholm county, on 21 May 1926. He was born to correspondent Sigurd Pousette and Ellen, née Andersson. After graduating from the KTH Royal Institute of Technology in 1951, he came to Boliden Gruv AB where he was a mining engineer from 1952 to 1955, head of department from 1955 to 1961 and chief engineer from 1961 to 1963. He then worked abroad as technical director for LAMCO in Liberia from 1963 to 1967. Returning to Sweden, he was vice president of AB Förenade Superfosfatfabriken from 1967 until 1970, CEO of Munksjö AB from 1970 to 1971 and CEO of IP Ekonomi AB from 1972. Pousette was also Swedish consul in Yekepa between 1964 and 1967.

In the years from 1950 to 1971 he was married to teacher Sara Montan (1924–2004), daughter of vocational teacher André Montan and Hulda Grundström. From 1971 until his death, he was then married to MPhil Gunilla Bouvin (born 1944), daughter of vocational teacher Erik Bouvin and Ragnhild Bouvin.

He is buried in Bromma Cemetery in Stockholm.
