= List of ambassadors of Sweden to Ivory Coast =

Ambassador of Sweden to Ivory Coast
- Lesser coat of arms of the Kingdom of Sweden
- Incumbent; Katrin Månsson since 2025
- Ministry for Foreign Affairs; Swedish Embassy, Abidjan
- Style: His or Her Excellency (formal); Mr. or Madam Ambassador (informal)
- Reports to: Minister for Foreign Affairs
- Residence: 1 Avenue Félix Éboué, Cocody (Note: In the 1960s, when Sweden had its first embassy in Abidjan, the residence was located at 1 Avenue Félix Éboué, Cocody.)
- Seat: Stockholm, Sweden (Note: The Swedish ambassador to Ivory Coast is resident in Stockholm, Sweden.)
- Appointer: Government of Sweden
- Term length: No fixed term
- Inaugural holder: Torsten Brandel
- Formation: 1961

The Ambassador of Sweden to Ivory Coast (known formally as the Ambassador of the Kingdom of Sweden to the Republic of Côte d'Ivoire) is the official representative of the government of Sweden to the president of Ivory Coast and government of Ivory Coast. The ambassador is based in Stockholm and travels regularly to the Ivory Coast.

== History ==
On the occasion of Ivory Coast's independence on 7 August 1960, Sweden's acting foreign minister, Ragnar Edenman, sent a congratulatory telegram to the new nation's president and head of government, Félix Houphouët-Boigny. The telegram stated that the Swedish government recognized Ivory Coast as a sovereign and independent state, and expressed hopes for friendly and cordial relations between the two countries. At the same time, King Gustaf Adolf also sent his congratulations by telegram.

A Swedish delegation returned from a study and inspection trip in West Africa in May 1960 and submitted their report to the Ministry for Foreign Affairs in January 1961, recommending that a Swedish diplomatic mission be opened in Monrovia, Liberia, with the head of the mission temporarily accredited to neighboring countries, including Ivory Coast. The embassy in Monrovia was later opened in the same year, and the head of the mission was accredited in Abidjan.

At the celebration of Ivory Coast's first anniversary as an independent state on 6–7 August 1961, Sweden was represented at the festivities in Abidjan by Consul Carl Gustav Blomqwist in Monrovia in the capacity of ambassadeur en mission spéciale.

In December 1962, the so-called Ministry for Foreign Affairs (UD) investigation proposed that a new diplomatic mission be opened in West Africa, either in Abidjan, Ivory Coast, or Accra, Ghana. In a proposal to Parliament in March 1963, it was suggested that an embassy be opened in Abidjan, with its jurisdiction also covering the republics of Mali, Niger, Togo, and Upper Volta. In September, Karl Henrik Andersson was appointed as Sweden's first resident ambassador in Abidjan, where the new Swedish embassy was established later that year. The ambassador was also accredited to the Dahomey, Mali, Niger, and the Upper Volta.

In 1967, the embassy was closed after it was determined that a permanent diplomatic mission was not as necessary as in other African countries. The Swedish ambassador in Monrovia was once again accredited to Abidjan.

In 1978, Sweden reestablished an embassy in Abidjan. On 15 November 2004, in the aftermath of the French–Ivorian clashes during the Ivorian Civil War, the Swedish embassy in Abidjan was closed temporarily, and the ambassador returned to Stockholm. Since 2007, Sweden has had a Stockholm-based ambassador to Ivory Coast.

== List of representatives ==
Name	Period	Resident/Non resident	Title	Notes	Presented credentials	Ref
Torsten Brandel	1961–1962	Non-resident	Ambassador	Resident in Monrovia		
Bo Järnstedt	1962–1964	Non-resident	Ambassador	Resident in Monrovia		
Karl Henrik Andersson	1964–1967	Resident	Ambassador	Also accredited in Bamako, Niamey, Ouagadougou, and Porto-Novo		
Olof Ripa	1967–1969	Non-resident	Ambassador	Resident in Monrovia		
Hans-Efraim Sköld	1969–1972	Non-resident	Ambassador	Resident in Monrovia		
Bengt Friedman	1973–1976	Non-resident	Ambassador	Resident in Monrovia		
Olof Skoglund	1976–1977	Non-resident	Ambassador	Resident in Monrovia		
Hans-Olle Olsson	1978–1981	Resident	Ambassador	Also accredited to Bissau, Praia (both 1979–1980 (Note: In the 1979 edition of Sveriges statskalender, Hans-Olle Olsson is listed in Abidjan, Ivory Coast as ambassador concurrently accredited to Guinea-Bissau and Cape Verde from 1979 and in the 1980 edition, Sven Fredrik Hedin is listed in Lisbon, Portugal as ambassador concurrently accredited to Guinea-Bissau and Cape Verde from 1980.)), and Bamako (from 1980)		
Bengt Borglund	1982–1987	Resident	Ambassador	Also accredited to Lomé, Ouagadougou, and Porto-Novo (all from 1983)		
Arne Ekfeldt	1987–1992	Resident	Ambassador	Also accredited to Lomé, Ouagadougou, and Porto-Novo		
Peter Bruce	1992–1995	Resident	Ambassador	Also accredited to Lomé, Ouagadougou, and Porto-Novo		
Bo Wilén	1995–1999	Resident	Ambassador	Also accredited to Lomé, Ouagadougou, and Porto-Novo (all from 1996)		
Göran Ankarberg	1999–2002	Resident	Ambassador	Also accredited to Freetown (from 2000), Monrovia, and Ouagadougou		
Inga Björk-Klevby	2002–2005	Resident (Note: The ambassador returned to Stockholm in November 2004 after the embassy was closed during the ongoing Ivorian Civil War.)	Ambassador	Also accredited to Freetown, Monrovia, and Ouagadougou (from 2003)		
–	2006–2007	Non-resident	Ambassador	Vacant		
Carin Wall	2007–2010	Non-resident	Ambassador	Resident in Stockholm		
?	2010–2012	Non-resident	Ambassador	Resident in Stockholm		
Per Carlson	2012–2017	Non-resident	Ambassador	Resident in Stockholm	12 April 2012	
Maria Leissner	2018–2021	Non-resident	Ambassador	Resident in Stockholm	13 November 2018	
Mia Rimby	2021–2025	Non-resident	Ambassador	Resident in Stockholm	2 March 2023	
Katrin Månsson	2025–present	Non-resident	Ambassador	Resident in Stockholm	11 February 2026	
