= Olof Skoglund =

Swedish diplomat (1925–2018)

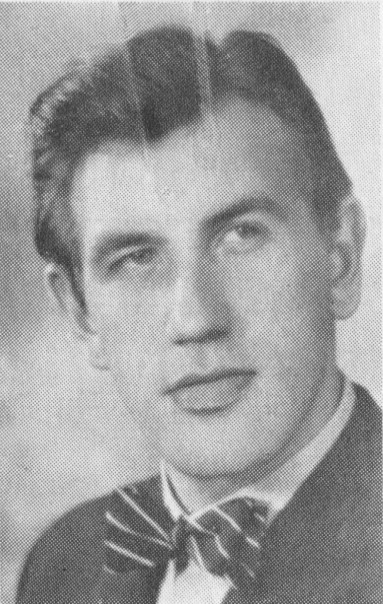
- Skoglund, circa early 1950s
- Born: Karl Olof Martin Skoglund; 12 May 1925; Risinge, Sweden
- Died: 16 April 2018 (aged 92); Stockholm, Sweden
- Education: Uppsala University
- Occupation: Diplomat
- Years active: 1952–1991
- Spouse: Monica Kylén (m. 1962; died 2013)
- Father: Martin Skoglund

Karl Olof Martin Skoglund (12 May 1925 – 16 April 2018) was a Swedish diplomat with a long career in the Ministry for Foreign Affairs, beginning in 1955 after completing his judicial clerkship. He held a series of international postings, including Lisbon, Washington, D.C., Moscow, and Sweden's Permanent Representation to the United Nations in New York City.

He was appointed ambassador in 1976, based in Monrovia, with multiple concurrent accreditations in West Africa. He later served as minister in London and became ambassador to Prague in 1981. From 1985 to 1990, he held several ambassadorial assignments in Central Africa, based in Stockholm, with responsibility for multiple countries simultaneously. Toward the end of his career, he worked directly under the minister for foreign affairs on special negotiation assignments.

== Early life ==
Skoglund was born on 12 May 1925 at the family farm in Doverstorp, in Risinge Parish in Finspång Municipality, Östergötland County, Sweden, the son of First Deputy Speaker Martin Skoglund (1892–1976) and his wife Elsa, née Andersson (1893–1973). He had an older sister named Brita (born 1918).

He received a Candidate of Law degree from Uppsala University in 1951 and became a reserve officer at the Norrbotten Regiment (I 19).

== Career ==
Skoglund completed his judicial clerkship from 1952 to 1955, after which he became an attaché at the Ministry for Foreign Affairs in 1955. He was posted to Lisbon in 1956, returned to the ministry in 1958, and was stationed in Washington, D.C. in 1960. He went back to the ministry again in 1964, was posted to Moscow in 1968, and served at Sweden's Permanent Representation to the United Nations in New York City in 1971.

In 1976, he was appointed ambassador to Monrovia, with concurrent accreditation to Abidjan, Freetown, Conakry, Bissau, and Praia. He became minister in London in 1977 and was appointed ambassador to Prague in 1981. From 1985 to 1990, he served as ambassador to Kinshasa, Yaoundé, Bangui, and Malabo, based in Stockholm, with additional accreditation to Brazzaville from 1986 and Libreville from 1987. Between 1990 and 1991, he was at the disposal of the minister for foreign affairs, including for negotiation assignments.

== Personal life ==
On 13 May 1962, at Saint Lawrence Church in Falkenberg, Skoglund married Monica Schlanbusch, née Kylén (1926–2013), the daughter of dentist Gert Kylén and gymnastics director Rigmor (née Strige).

Skoglund took over the family farm, Doverstorp in Östergötland, from his parents. He had a strong interest in the history of Östergötland and Risinge socken, as well as in the church and the local heritage association. In 2015, he founded the Olof Skoglund Foundation, whose purpose is to support and promote cultural and historical activities in Östergötland.

== Death ==
Skoglund died on 16 April 2018 in Stockholm. In his final years, he lived at the Kampementet nursing home on Gärdet in Stockholm. The funeral service took place at Risinge Church on 24 May 2018. He was interred on 6 July 2018 in his parents' grave at St. Mary's Cemetery in Finspång.

Diplomatic posts
Preceded by Bengt Friedman	Ambassador of Sweden to Liberia; 1976–1977	Succeeded by Cai Melin
Preceded by Bengt Friedman	Ambassador of Sweden to Sierra Leone; 1976–1977	Succeeded by Cai Melin
Preceded by Bengt Friedman	Ambassador of Sweden to Ivory Coast; 1976–1977	Succeeded by Hans-Olle Olsson
Preceded by Bengt Friedman	Ambassador of Sweden to Guinea; 1976–1977	Succeeded by Hans-Olle Olsson
Preceded by Bengt Friedman	Ambassador of Sweden to Guinea-Bissau; 1976–1977	Succeeded by Hans-Olle Olsson
Preceded by Bengt Friedman	Ambassador of Sweden to Cape Verde; 1976–1977	Succeeded by Hans-Olle Olsson
Preceded by Bengt Rösiö	Ambassador of Sweden to Czechoslovakia; 1981–1984	Succeeded by Karl-Vilhelm Wöhler
Preceded by Karl Henrik Andersson	Ambassador of Sweden to Zaire; 1985–1990	Succeeded by Bengt Rösiö
Preceded by Karl Henrik Andersson	Ambassador of Sweden to Cameroon; 1985–1990	Succeeded by Carl-Erhard Lindahl
Preceded by Karl Henrik Andersson	Ambassador of Sweden to the Central African Republic; 1985–1990	Succeeded by Bengt Rösiö
Preceded by None	Ambassador of Sweden to Equatorial Guinea; 1985–1990	Succeeded by Bengt Rösiö
Preceded by Karl Henrik Andersson	Ambassador of Sweden to the People's Republic of the Congo; 1986–1990	Succeeded by Bengt Rösiö
Preceded by Karl Henrik Andersson	Ambassador of Sweden to Gabon; 1987–1990	Succeeded by Carl-Erhard Lindahl
