= Bo Järnstedt =

Swedish diplomat (1911–1992)

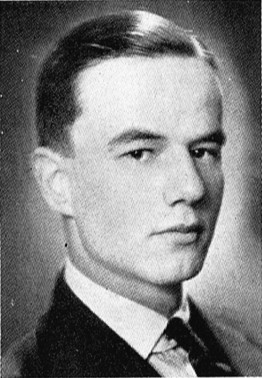
- Järnstedt as a student in the 1920s
- Born: Bo Gunnar Järnstedt; 2 September 1911; Eksjö, Sweden
- Died: 15 December 1992 (aged 81); Malmö, Sweden
- Education: Uppsala University; Stockholm School of Economics
- Occupation: Diplomat
- Years active: 1940–1977
- Spouse: Gun Lundgren (m. 1939)

Bo Gunnar Järnstedt (2 September 1911 – 15 December 1992) was a Swedish diplomat. Järnstedt began his diplomatic career in 1940 as assistant military attaché in Berlin and later that year joined the Swedish Ministry for Foreign Affairs. He steadily rose through the ranks, becoming second secretary in 1946, and first secretary in 1949. His international postings included roles in New Zealand, Korea, and India, and from 1959 to 1962, he served as consul general in Chicago, where he worked closely with the large Swedish-American community. In 1962, he was appointed ambassador to Liberia, also accredited to several other West African countries. He played a key role in managing Sweden’s industrial presence in Liberia, particularly through the LAMCO mining project. After his time in West Africa, Järnstedt returned to Chicago as consul general and later served as ambassador to Ireland from 1973 to 1977.

== Early life ==
Järnstedt was born on 2 September 1911 in Eksjö, Sweden, the son of merchant Justus Järnstedt and his wife Elsa Engström. He was the brother of the artist Bertil Järnstedt (1913–1970).

He earned a Candidate of Law degree from Uppsala University in 1934, completed a degree in economics at the Stockholm School of Economics in 1937, and obtained a Bachelor of Arts from Uppsala University in 1938.

== Career ==
Järnstedt was appointed assistant military attaché in Berlin in 1940 and, later that year, became an attaché at the Ministry for Foreign Affairs. He was promoted to second secretary in 1946 and first secretary in 1949. From 1953 to 1957, he served as chargé d’affaires ad interim in Wellington, New Zealand, and from 1954 to 1955, he was a deputy and acting member of the Neutral Nations Supervisory Commission (NNSC) in Korea. He then served as counsellor at the Swedish Embassy in New Delhi from 1957 to 1959, followed by a posting as consul general in Chicago from 1959 to 1962. One of Järnstedt's key responsibilities in Chicago was maintaining strong ties with the city's Swedish community. At the time, the Chicago metropolitan area was home to more Swedes than any city in the world outside Stockholm and Gothenburg.

In January 1962, Järnstedt was appointed ambassador to Monrovia, succeeding Ambassador Torsten Brandel, who had returned to Sweden for health reasons. In March, he presented his credentials to President William Tubman. He was also concurrently accredited to Accra, Conakry, Freetown, and later Abidjan.

During the early 1960s, Järnstedt was central in promoting and managing Sweden's industrial and diplomatic presence in Liberia during the early 1960s, especially through the LAMCO mining project. He emphasized how Swedish investments enhanced national prestige and supported Liberia’s development, while also carefully framing aid initiatives—like a vocational school—as support for the Liberian state rather than hidden subsidies for Swedish business. Aware of rising anti-colonial sentiment, Järnstedt worked to avoid accusations of neocolonialism, highlighting Sweden’s non-colonial past and commitment to fairness. Tensions later emerged between diplomats like Järnstedt and new aid authorities (SIDA), who sought to separate aid from commercial interests, especially after public criticism of LAMCO’s labor practices raised questions about Sweden’s role in the Global South.

Järnstedt returned to Chicago as consul general from 1964 to 1973 and later served as ambassador to Dublin from 1973 to 1977.

== Personal life ==
In 1939, Järnstedt married Margareta (Gun) Lundgren (1918–2014), the daughter of Victor Lundgren and Nannie (née Carlsohn).He had two children Margareta 1940 and Bo 1943. Margareta moved to the United States and married James Alexander Jr 1968 having two Children, James 1970 and Caryn 1972. Bo moved to the United States and Married Natalie (née Holobovich) 1968.

== Death ==
Järnstedt died on 15 December 1992 in St. Peter's Parish in Malmö, Sweden. He was interred on 23 June 1993 at Sankt Lars Cemetery in his hometown of Eksjö.

== Awards and decorations ==
- (Sweden) Commander 1st Class of the Order of the Polar Star (18 November 1971)
- (Sweden) Commander of the Order of the Polar Star (11 November 1967)
- (Sweden) Knight of the Order of the Polar Star (6 June 1961)
- (Denmark) Knight of the Order of the Dannebrog
- Knight of the Order of the White Rose of Finland
- (Greece) Knight of the Order of the Phoenix
- (Netherlands) Knight of the Order of Orange-Nassau

Diplomatic posts
| Preceded by Gösta Oldenburg | Consul General of Sweden to Chicago; 1959–1962 | Succeeded by Folke Persson |
| Preceded by Torsten Brandel | Ambassador of Sweden to Liberia; 1962–1964 | Succeeded by Olof Ripa |
| Preceded by Torsten Brandel | Ambassador of Sweden to Ghana; 1962–1964 | Succeeded by Olof Ripa |
| Preceded by Torsten Brandel | Ambassador of Sweden to Guinea; 1962–1964 | Succeeded by Olof Ripa |
| Preceded by Torsten Brandel | Ambassador of Sweden to Sierra Leone; 1962–1964 | Succeeded by Olof Ripa |
| Preceded by Torsten Brandel | Ambassador of Sweden to Ivory Coast; 1962–1964 | Succeeded by Karl Henrik Andersson |
| Preceded by Folke Persson | Consul General of Sweden to Chicago; 1964–1973 | Succeeded by Karl Henrik Andersson |
| Preceded by Eyvind Bratt | Ambassador of Sweden to Ireland; 1973–1977 | Succeeded by Lennart Myrsten |
