= List of ambassadors of Sweden to Guinea =

Ambassador of Sweden to Guinea
- Lesser coat of arms of the Kingdom of Sweden
- Incumbent; Katrin Månsson since 2025
- Ministry for Foreign Affairs
- Style: His or Her Excellency (formal); Mr. or Madam Ambassador (informal)
- Reports to: Minister for Foreign Affairs
- Seat: Stockholm, Sweden (Note: The Swedish ambassador to Guinea is resident in Stockholm, Sweden.)
- Appointer: Government of Sweden
- Term length: No fixed term
- Inaugural holder: Torsten Brandel
- Formation: 1961

The Ambassador of Sweden to Guinea (known formally as the Ambassador of the Kingdom of Sweden to the Republic of Guinea) is the official representative of the government of Sweden to the president of Guinea and government of Guinea. The ambassador is based in Stockholm and travels regularly to Guinea.

== History ==
On 30 October 1958, Sweden recognized the Republic of Guinea (formerly French Guinea). The announcement of the recognition was delivered in a telegram from Acting Foreign Minister, Cabinet Minister Herman Kling, to the government of Guinea.

In May 1960, a Swedish delegation undertook a trip to West Africa in which nine countries were visited, including Guinea. The purpose of the journey was, among other things, to provide Swedish authorities with the supplementary information that was needed in order to comprehensively assess the appropriate extent of Swedish representation in this part of Africa. From 4 to 6 May, the delegation visited Guinea's capital, Conakry.

In January 1961, Sweden planned to establish three new diplomatic missions in Africa, including an independent mission in Liberia. The proposed mission in Monrovia was intended to serve not only Liberia but also Ghana, Guinea, and Sierra Leone. A delegation recommended setting up at least two missions in West Africa, prioritizing Monrovia and Lagos. Additionally, a third mission was suggested for one of the French-speaking West African republics, such as Dakar or Abidjan. Until further expansions, the head of the Monrovia mission was to be accredited to some former French republics. These proposals were part of Sweden's efforts to strengthen economic ties and were reflected in that year's budget proposal. In August 1961, Torsten Brandel, who in May of that year had been appointed as Sweden's first resident ambassador in Monrovia, was also accredited as ambassador to certain neighboring countries, including Guinea.

The Swedish ambassador accredited to Guinea was based in Stockholm in the late 1970s, following the downgrading of the embassy in Monrovia. In 2000, Sweden opened an embassy in Dakar, Senegal, and the ambassador there was subsequently accredited to Guinea. The embassy closed 10 years later, and the ambassador to Guinea was once again based in Stockholm.

== List of representatives ==
Name	Period	Title	Notes	Presented credentials	Ref
Torsten Brandel	1961–1962	Ambassador	Resident in Monrovia.		
Bo Järnstedt	1962 (Note: The Sveriges statskalender (1964), pp. 310-311, lists the year as 1963. However, Dagens Nyheter reported in March 1962 that Bo Järnstedt had already presented his credentials to President William Tubman in Monrovia. Vem är det ("Who's Who") (1984), p. 571, also states the year as 1962. Svenska Dagbladet reported in May 1962 that Ambassador Bo Järnstedt, "who is Sweden's envoy in Monrovia, Accra, Conakry and Freetown" has been appointed ambassador also in Abidjan.)–1964	Ambassador	Resident in Monrovia.		
Olof Ripa	1964–1968	Ambassador	Resident in Monrovia.		
Hans-Efraim Sköld	1969–1972	Ambassador	Resident in Monrovia.		
Bengt Friedman	1973–1976	Ambassador	Resident in Monrovia.		
Olof Skoglund	1976–1977	Ambassador	Resident in Monrovia.		
Cai Melin	1979–1983	Ambassador	Resident in Stockholm.		
Erik Cornell	1983–1988	Ambassador	Resident in Stockholm.		
Bengt Holmquist	1989–1992	Ambassador	Resident in Stockholm.		
Magnus Faxén	1993–1995	Ambassador	Resident in Stockholm.		
Carl-Erhard Lindahl	1995–1996	Ambassador	Resident in Stockholm.		
Nils-Erik Schyberg	1997–1998	Ambassador	Resident in Stockholm.		
–	1999–2000	Ambassador	Vacant.		
Bo Wilén	2000–2002	Ambassador	Resident in Dakar.		
Annika Magnusson	2002–2005	Ambassador	Resident in Dakar.		
Agneta Bohman	2006–2010	Ambassador	Resident in Dakar.		
Per Carlson	2011–2017	Ambassador	Resident in Stockholm.	9 September 2011	
Maria Leissner	2017–2021	Ambassador	Resident in Stockholm.		
Mia Rimby	2021–2025	Ambassador	Resident in Stockholm.		
Katrin Månsson	2025–present	Ambassador	Resident in Stockholm.		
