= Marie Ehrling =

Swedish executive

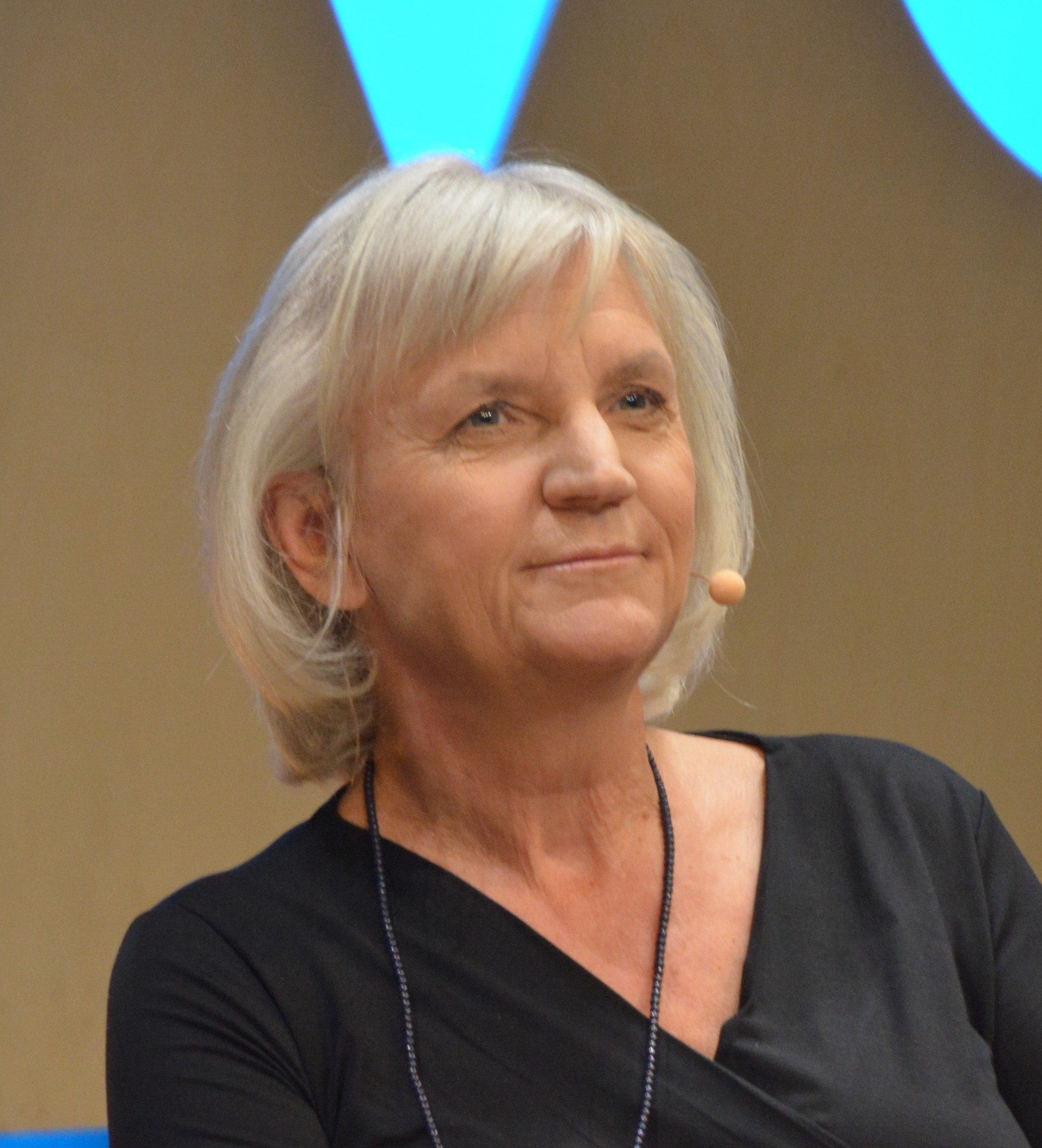
Ehrling in 2017

Marie Ehrling (born 5 May 1955) is a Swedish business executive.

She received an undergraduate degree at the Stockholm School of Economics at the age of 21.

She was listed #85 in Forbes magazine's List of The World's 100 Most Powerful Women in 2006.

Formerly deputy chief executive of SAS, the Danish-Norwegian-Swedish airline group, which she left in 2002, after 20 years, when she was passed over for the top spot.

She went on to head TeliaSonera Sweden, the $4.8 billion Swedish subsidiary of telecommunications giant TeliaSonera. Under her leadership, TeliaSonera has acquired foreign companies and offered cutting-edge technology, and is also noted for dealing with stiff competition via layoffs. Ehrling has become a vocal advocate for deregulation of the Swedish telecom industry.

She is also a board member of Securitas AB, Nordea Bank AB, Oriflame Cosmetic SA, Loomis AB, Schibsted ASA, Safegate AB, the Centre for Advanced Studies in Leadership at the Stockholm School of Economics, Disruptive Pharma and the World Childhood Foundation.

== Personal life ==
She is married to Lars Mydland with one son, Jacob Westerberg, from a previous marriage with the former politician Bengt Westerberg.

=== Distinctions ===
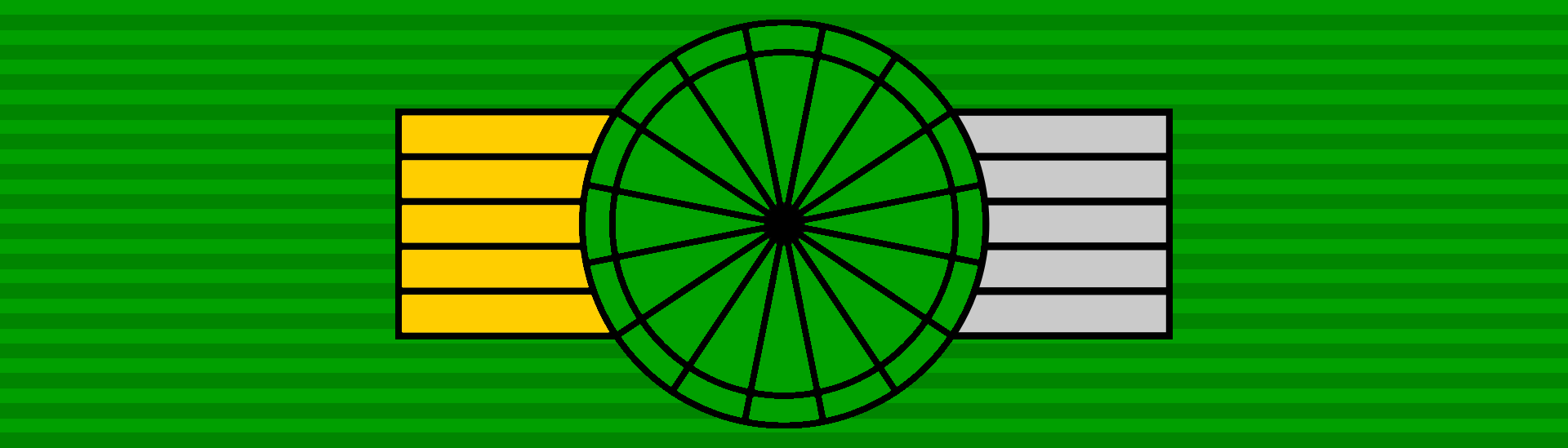
- Sweden: Royal Order of Vasa, Commander 1st Class (30 April 2025)
- Sweden: H. M. The King's Medal, 12th size on a blue ribbon (2012)
