= List of ambassadors of Sweden to Gabon =

Ambassador of Sweden to Gabon
- Lesser coat of arms of the Kingdom of Sweden
- Incumbent; Joakim Vaverka since 2024
- Ministry for Foreign Affairs
- Style: His or Her Excellency (formal); Mr. or Madam Ambassador (informal)
- Reports to: Minister for Foreign Affairs; Swedish Embassy, Kinshasa
- Seat: Kinshasa, Democratic Republic of the Congo (Note: The Swedish ambassador in Kinshasa, Democratic Republic of the Congo is also accredited in Libreville.)
- Appointer: Government of Sweden
- Term length: No fixed term
- Inaugural holder: Dag Malm
- Formation: 1965

The Ambassador of Sweden to Gabon (known formally as the Ambassador of the Kingdom of Sweden to the Gabonese Republic) is the official representative of the government of Sweden to the president of Gabon and government of Gabon. Since Sweden does not have an embassy in Libreville, Sweden's ambassador in Kinshasa, Democratic Republic of the Congo, is also accredited to Libreville, the capital of Gabon.

== History ==
In May 1960, a Swedish delegation undertook a trip to West Africa in which nine countries were visited, including Gabon. The purpose of the journey was, among other things, to provide Swedish authorities with the supplementary information that was needed in order to comprehensively assess the appropriate extent of Swedish representation in this part of Africa.

On the occasion of the Gabonese Republic's declaration of independence on 17 August 1960, Foreign Minister Östen Undén sent a congratulatory telegram to its president and head of government, Léon M'ba. In the telegram, it was stated that the Swedish government recognized Gabon as a sovereign and independent state and expressed hopes for friendly and cordial relations between the two countries. At the same time, King Gustaf VI Adolf also sent a telegram of congratulations. At the celebration of Gabon's first anniversary as an independent state on 17 August 1961, Sweden was represented at the festivities in Libreville by Consul Bengt Rösiö in Léopoldville in the capacity of ambassadeur en mission spéciale.

In January 1961, it was proposed in the government budget bill that the Swedish consulate in Léopoldville, Republic of the Congo be replaced by an embassy. The embassy opened in 1962, and in 1965 the Swedish ambassador in Léopoldville was also accredited to Libreville, with residence in Léopoldville (later renamed Kinshasa).

== List of representatives ==
Name	Period	Title	Notes	Presented credentials	Ref
Dag Malm	1965–1967	Ambassador	Resident in Léopoldville		
Olof Bjurström	1967–1971	Ambassador	Resident in Kinshasa	25 May 1968	
Henrik Ramel	1972–1976	Ambassador	Resident in Kinshasa		
Ragnar Petri	1977–1979	Ambassador	Resident in Kinshasa		
Karl Henrik Andersson	1980–1984	Ambassador	Resident in Kinshasa (1980–83) and Stockholm (1983–84)		
–	1985–1986	Ambassador	Vacant		
Olof Skoglund	1987–1990	Ambassador	Resident in Stockholm		
–	1991–1991	Ambassador	Vacant		
Carl-Erhard Lindahl	1992–2001	Ambassador	Resident in Stockholm		
Robert Rydberg	2002–2003	Ambassador	Resident in Kinshasa		
Magnus Wernstedt	2004–2007	Ambassador	Resident in Kinshasa		
Helena Rietz	2007–2008	Ambassador	Resident in Kinshasa		
Johan Borgstam	2010–2011	Ambassador	Resident in Kinshasa		
Mette Sunnergren	2011–2013	Ambassador	Resident in Kinshasa		
Annika Ben David	2013–2016	Ambassador	Resident in Kinshasa		
Maria Håkansson	2016–2019	Ambassador	Resident in Kinshasa		
Henric Råsbrant	2019–2024	Ambassador	Resident in Kinshasa	6 May 2021	
Joakim Vaverka	2024–present	Ambassador	Resident in Kinshasa	September 2025	
