= Maria Leissner =

Swedish politician (born 1956)

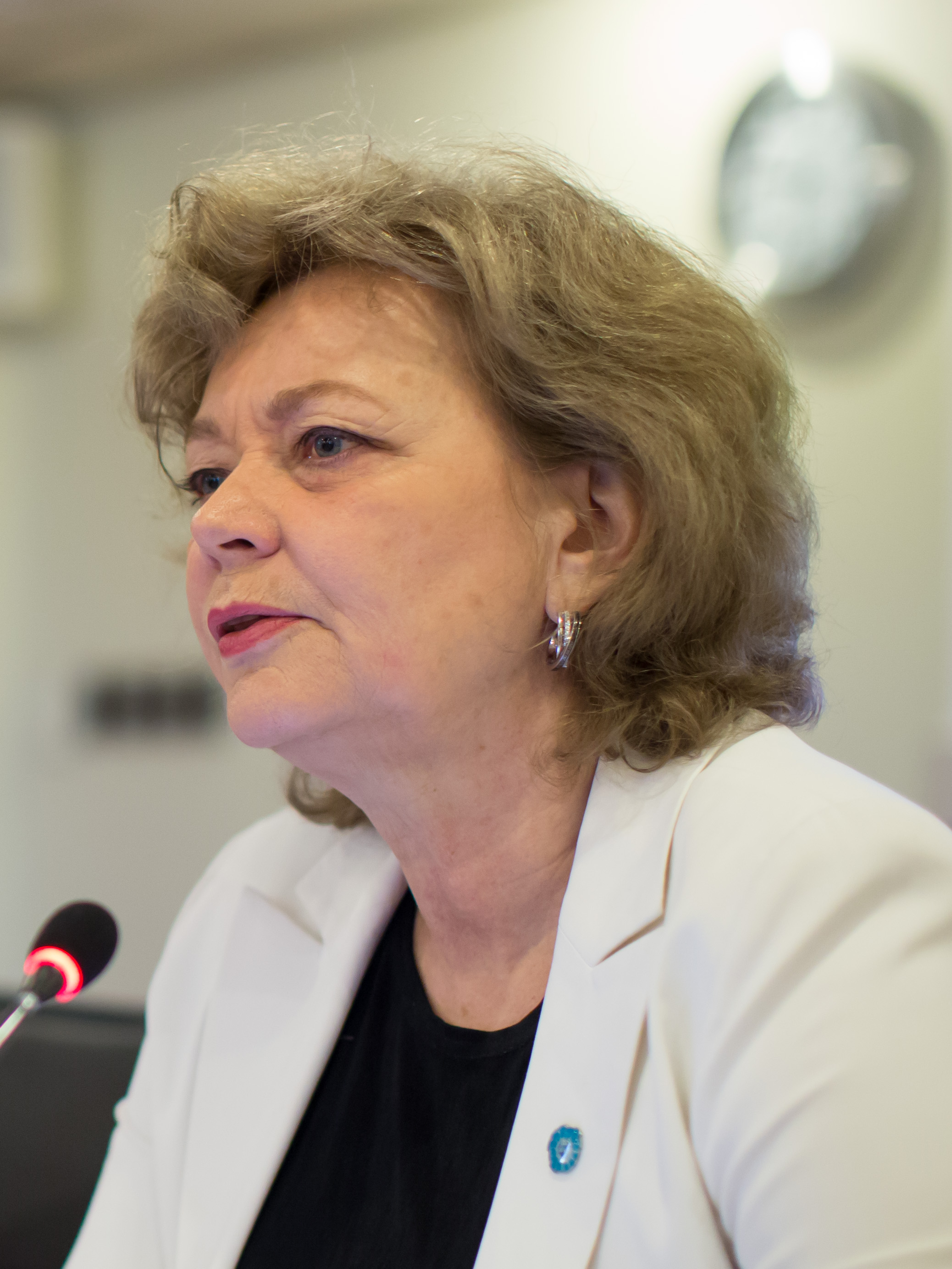
- Leissner in 2015
- Born: Annika Maria Leissner; 21 January 1956 (age 70); Gothenburg, Sweden
- Education: Uppsala University
- Occupations: Politician, diplomat
- Years active: 1981–
- Political party: Liberals
- Partner: Hans Holmgren (1982; died 1996)

Annika Maria Leissner (born 21 January 1956) is a Swedish politician and former party leader of the Swedish Liberal People's Party (1995–97).

== Early life ==
Leissner was born on 21 January 1956 in Gothenburg, Sweden, the son of Pehr Leissner, a doctor, and his wife Ulla (née Hallberg), a sociologist. She completed studies in Gothenburg and at Uppsala University (international economics) from 1975 to 1980.

== Career ==
Leissner was the federal secretary of the People's Party Youth League from 1981 to 1983 and its federal chairman from 1983 to 1985. In 1985, she worked as an organizational secretary for Rädda Barnen. She served as a Member of Parliament for the Liberal People's Party from 1985 to 1991 and became the party leader in 1995.

Leissner was chairman of the Swedish Committee for Afghanistan from 1991 to 1995 and the Women Can Foundation (Stiftelsen Kvinnor kan) from 1993 to 1995. She served as the Swedish ambassador in Guatemala City from 2000 to 2004, with additional accreditations in Belmopan, San José (from 2001), San Salvador, and Tegucigalpa.

In January 2007 she was appointed Ambassador-at-large for Democracy. In April 2012 she was appointed Secretary-General of Community of Democracies.

On 5 October 2017, she took office as Stockholm-based ambassador of Sweden to Benin. Between 2017 and 2021, Leissner served as Stockholm-based ambassador-at-large to West Africa, including Benin, The Gambia, Guinea, Ivory Coast, Senegal, and Sierra Leone.

== Personal life ==
From 1982 to 1996, Leissner was in a domestic partnership with Hans Holmgren (1982–1996), the son of civil engineer Karl Olof Holmgren and Ingrid (née Stener).

== Bibliography ==
- En generösare invandrar- och flyktingpolitik (1988)
- Democracy promotion in a transatlantic perspective (2009)

Party political offices
Preceded by Bengt Westerberg	Leader of the Swedish Liberal People's Party; 1995–1997	Succeeded by Lars Leijonborg
Preceded by Peter Örn	Chairperson of the Liberal Youth of Sweden; 1983–1985	Succeeded by Thorbjörn Pettersson
Diplomatic posts
Preceded by Staffan Wrigstad	Ambassador of Sweden to Guatemala; 2000–2004	Succeeded by Eivor Halkjaer
Preceded by Staffan Wrigstad	Ambassador of Sweden to Belize; 2000–2004	Succeeded by Eivor Halkjaer
Preceded by Staffan Wrigstad	Ambassador of Sweden to Honduras; 2000–2004	Succeeded by Eivor Halkjaer
Preceded by Staffan Wrigstad	Ambassador of Sweden to El Salvador; 2000–2004	Succeeded by Eivor Halkjaer
Preceded by Klas Markensten	Ambassador of Sweden to Costa Rica; 2001–2004	Succeeded by Eivor Halkjaer
Preceded by Per Carlson	Ambassador of Sweden to Benin; 2017–2021	Succeeded by Mia Rimby
Preceded by Per Carlson	Ambassador of Sweden to Guinea; 2017–2021	Succeeded by Mia Rimby
Preceded by Per Carlson	Ambassador of Sweden to Sierra Leone; 2017–2021	Succeeded by Mia Rimby
Preceded by Per Carlson	Ambassador of Sweden to Ivory Coast; 2018–2021	Succeeded by Mia Rimby
Preceded by Per Carlson	Ambassador of Sweden to Senegal; 2019–2021	Succeeded by Mia Rimby
Preceded by Per Carlson	Ambassador of Sweden to the Gambia; 2019–2021	Succeeded by Mia Rimby
