= Alexis Aminoff =

Swedish diplomat and chamberlain (1897–1977)

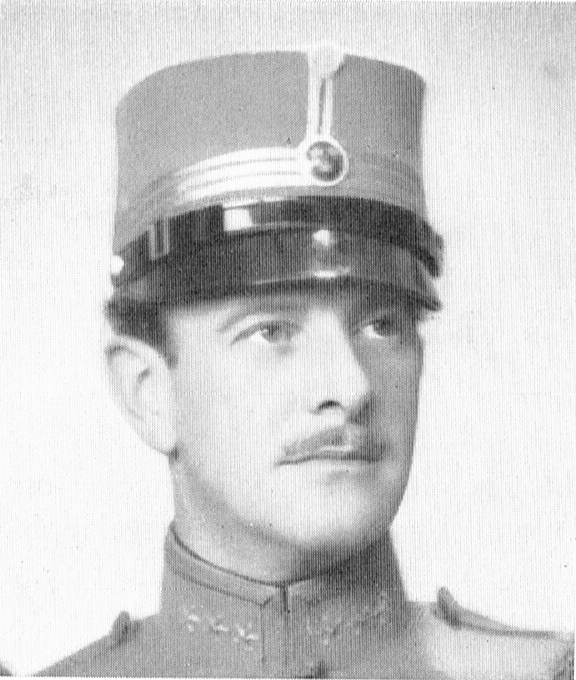
- Born: Gregor Iwan Alexis Feodor Aminoff; 4 April 1897; Stockholm, Sweden
- Died: 26 April 1977 (aged 80); Stockholm, Sweden
- Occupation: Diplomat
- Years active: 1926–1977
- Spouse: Märtha Linder (m. 1925)
- Children: 2
- Relatives: Ernst Linder (father-in-law)

Gregor Iwan Alexis Feodor Aminoff (4 April 1897 – 26 April 1977) was a Swedish diplomat and chamberlain.

== Early life ==
Born into the noble Aminoff family on 4 April 1897 in Stockholm, Sweden, he was the son of Cabinet Chamberlain Gregor Aminoff (1872–1934) and his wife Elisabeth (née af Edholm). He had two siblings, including the courtier Georg Aminoff (1895–1977). His grandfather was the officer Ivan Feodor Aminoff (1797–1855).

Aminoff passed studentexamen in Stockholm on 15 May 1915. He received a Bachelor of Arts degree in 1925.

== Career ==
=== Military career ===
Aminoff began his military career as an officer cadet in the Life Guards of Horse on 10 October 1915, and enrolled at Military Academy Karlberg the same year. He graduated from the Military Academy on 19 December 1917 and was commissioned as a second lieutenant in the Life Guards of Horse on 31 December 1917. He resigned in 1919 with permission to join the regiment's reserve as a second lieutenant on 29 August 1919 and was promoted to underlöjtnant in the reserve on 31 December 1919. He became a full lieutenant on 30 November 1922 and was appointed ryttmästare in 1934.

=== Diplomatic career ===
Aminoff became an attaché at the Ministry for Foreign Affairs in Stockholm in 1926. Aminoff left in 1928 and then worked in private companies. He served as chamberlain of the Duke and Duchess of Västergotland from 1935 to 1950, and he was back at the Foreign Ministry in 1938.

Aminoff became first secretary in 1939, first legation secretary in London in 1941, in Washington, D.C. in 1943, and was legation counsellor there in 1943. He was envoy in Athens from 1949 to 1951 and foreign affairs councillor and head of the human resources department at the Foreign Ministry from 1951 to 1954. Aminoff was then envoy in Pretoria from 1954 to 1959, ambassador in Lisbon from 1959 to 1963 and ambassador in Monrovia from 1959 to 1961 (accredited from Lisbon).

In August 1960, during Aminoff's tenure as ambassador in Lisbon, he was asked by UN Secretary-General Dag Hammarskjöld to act as an impartial mediator in the Buraimi dispute between the United Kingdom and Saudi Arabia.

Aminoff served as Marshal of the Diplomatic Corps (Introduktör av främmande sändebud) from 1970 to 1974 (deputy in 1966) and Grand Master of the Ceremonies from 1971 to 1977.

== Personal life ==
In 1925, Aminoff married Märtha Linder (1900–1991), the daughter of General Ernst Linder and baroness Augusta (née Wrangel von Brehmer). He was the father of Gregor (born 1926) and Alexandra (born 1933).

== Death ==
Aminoff died on 26 April 1977 in Oscar Parish in Stockholm, Sweden. He was interred on 20 June 1977 at the Aminoff family grave at Norra begravningsplatsen in Solna.

== Awards and decorations ==
=== Swedish ===
- (Sweden) King Gustaf V's Jubilee Commemorative Medal (1948)
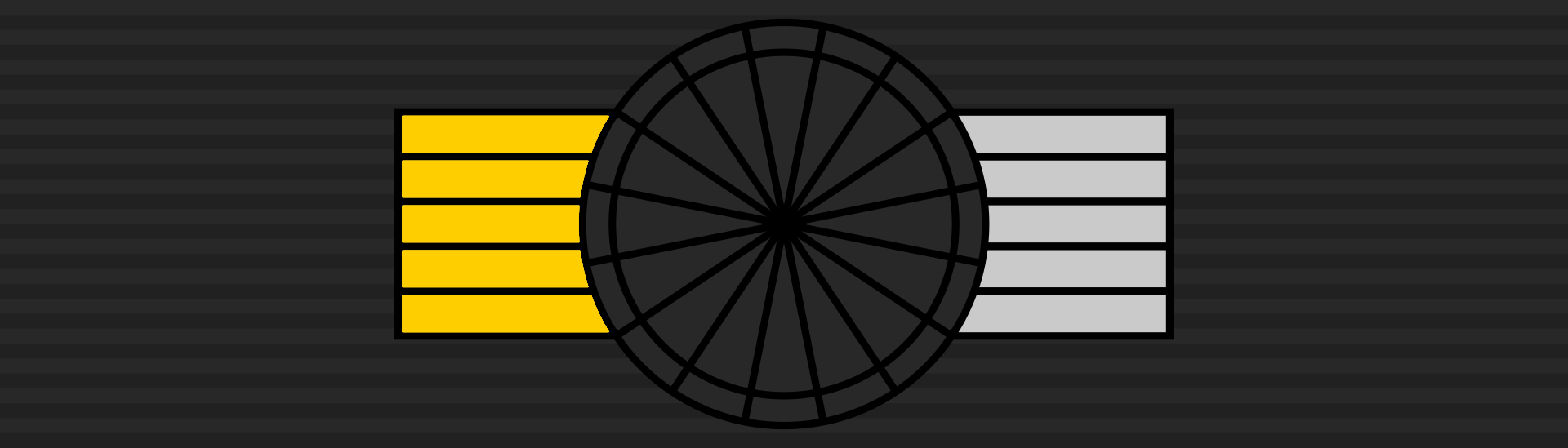
- (Sweden) Commander 1st Class of the Order of the Polar Star (4 June 1960)
- (Sweden) Commander of the Order of the Polar Star (6 June 1953)
- (Sweden) Knight of the Order of the Polar Star (1940)
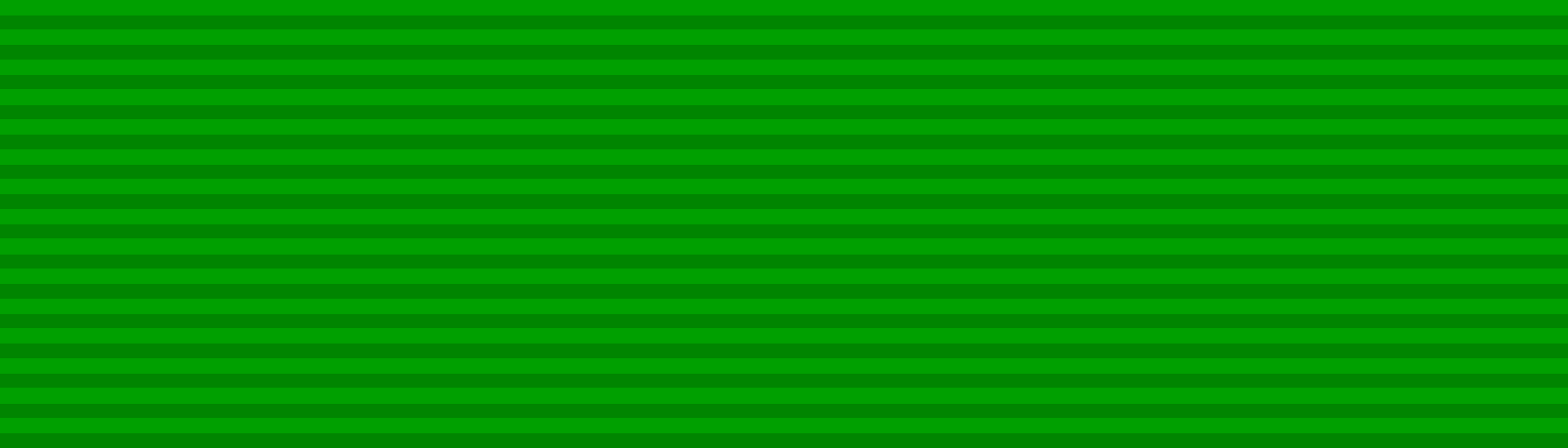
- (Sweden) Knight of the Order of Vasa (1937)

=== Foreign ===
- (Portugal) Grand Cross of the Military Order of Christ (19 October 1963)
- (Portugal) Grand Cross of the Order of Prince Henry (9 March 1961)
- (Greece) Grand Cross of the Order of the Phoenix
- (Liberia) Grand Commander of the Humane Order of African Redemption
- (Denmark) Commander 1st Class of the Order of the Dannebrog
- (Norway) Commander of the Order of St. Olav with star
- (Belgium) Commander of the Order of the Crown
- Commander of the Order of the White Rose of Finland
- Commander of the Order of the Crown of Italy
- (Poland) Commander of the Order of Polonia Restituta
- (France) Knight of the Legion of Honour

== See also ==
- Aminoff family

Diplomatic posts
Preceded by Knut Richard Thyberg	Envoy of Sweden to Greece; 1949–1951	Succeeded by Tage Grönwall
Preceded by Carl Olof Gisle	Envoy of Sweden to South Africa; 1954–1959	Succeeded by Eyvind Bratt
Preceded by Knut Richard Thyberg	Ambassador of Sweden to Portugal; 1959–1963	Succeeded by Gunnar Dryselius
Preceded by Knut Richard Thyberg	Ambassador of Sweden to Liberia; 1959–1961	Succeeded by Torsten Brandel
Preceded by ?	Marshal of the Diplomatic Corps; 1970–1974	Succeeded by Tage Grönwall
Court offices
Preceded by Joen Lagerberg	Grand Master of Ceremonies; 1971–1977	Succeeded by Tore Tallroth
