= Olof Ripa =

Swedish diplomat (1909–1992)

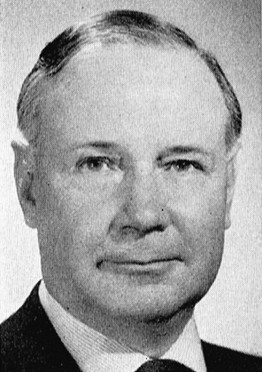
- Born: 15 January 1909; Stockholm, Sweden
- Died: 18 January 1992 (aged 83); Stockholm, Sweden
- Education: Saltsjöbadens Samskola
- Alma mater: Uppsala University
- Occupation: Diplomat
- Years active: 1937–1974
- Spouse: Margit Siwertz-Norling (m. 1949; died 1990)

Olof Ripa (15 January 1909 – 18 January 1992) was a Swedish diplomat. Ripa began his diplomatic career in 1937, serving in Helsinki, London, and The Hague, where he was cut off from Stockholm during the German invasion in 1940. He later became chargé d'affaires in Tehran in 1941, playing a key role in a prisoner exchange between Germany and the United Kingdom. His career continued with postings in Ankara, Tokyo, and at the Allied Headquarters in Japan. From 1950 onward, he held various high-ranking positions, including consul general in Montreal and envoy in Wellington. In the 1960s, he served as ambassador in multiple African nations before his final posting as ambassador in Sofia from 1969 to 1974.

== Early life ==
Ripa was born on 15 January 1909, in Stockholm, Sweden, the son of Edvin Ripa, a bank cashier, and his wife Edla (née Åbom). He passed his studentexamen at Saltsjöbadens Samskola in Saltsjöbaden in 1928. He worked as an amanuensis at the Swedish Institute of International Law (Svenska institutet för internationell rätt) from 1934 to 1937 and as a temporary staff member at the Secretariat of the League of Nations in Geneva in 1936 before earning his Candidate of Law degree at Uppsala University in 1937.

== Career ==
Ripa joined the Ministry for Foreign Affairs in Stockholm as an attaché in 1937. He served in Helsinki in 1938, London in 1939, and The Hague (as chargé d'affaires ad interim) in 1940. Ripa, along with a secretary, was the only Swedish representative on duty at the legation in The Hague on 10 May 1940, when Germany invaded the Netherlands. He was then cut off from contact with Stockholm for over a month. He also witnessed the German bombing of Rotterdam.

Ripa returned to the Ministry for Foreign Affairs the same year. Ripa was then appointed chargé d'affaires ad interim in Tehran in 1941. During his service in Tehran, he took part in a large-scale exchange of prisoners of war between Germany and the United Kingdom as Sweden's representative in its role as a protecting power. The urgency of the situation meant that he had to carry out this difficult task without the possibility of receiving instructions from home. In 1942, Ripa served in Ankara. In 1943, he became second secretary at the ministry. In 1945, he was posted to Tokyo, where he was promoted to first legation secretary in 1947 (acting in 1945). He also served as the diplomatic representative at the Allied Headquarters in Japan from 1946 to 1949. In 1949, he became first secretary at the Ministry for Foreign Affairs.

From 1950 to 1953, Ripa was first vice-consul in London, and from 1953 to 1954, he worked as a deputy mediator in the Neutral Nations Supervisory Commission in Korea. In 1954, he became first secretary at the embassy in Tokyo, and in 1955, he served as chargé d'affaires ad interim in Wellington. From 1956 to 1959, he held the position of consul and acting consul general in Montreal, and was chargé d'affaires ad interim in Ottawa from 1957 to 1958.

Ripa became consul general in Montreal from 1959 to 1960, envoy in Wellington in 1960, and consul general in Antwerp in 1962. He was appointed ambassador in Monrovia, Accra (until 1967), Conakry, and Freetown in 1964, and later in Abidjan in 1967. His final diplomatic posting was as ambassador in Sofia from 1969 to 1974.

== Personal life ==
One 21 May 1949, Ripa married to Margit Siwertz-Norling (1909–1990), the daughter of the author Sigfrid Siwertz and Elsa (née Ohlsson).

== Death ==
Ripa died on 18 January 1992 in Stockholm. The funeral service took place in Liljan's Chapel (Liljans kapell) at Råcksta cemetery in Stockholm on 4 February 1992. He was interred on 15 May 1992 at Norra begravningsplatsen in Stockholm.

== Awards and decorations ==
- (Sweden) Commander of the Order of the Polar Star (November 1969)
- (Sweden) Knight of the Order of the Polar Star
- (Italy) 2nd Class / Commander of the Order of the Star of Italian Solidarity
- (Belgium) Officer of the Order of the Crown (February 1947)
- (Greece) Officer of the Order of the Phoenix
- (Pahlavi dynasty) Officer of the Order of Homayoun
- (Netherlands) Officer of the Order of Orange-Nassau
- (Nazi Germany) 3rd Class of the Order of the German Eagle
- (Hungary) Officer of the Hungarian Order of Merit
- (Denmark) Knight of the Order of the Dannebrog
- Knight of the Order of the White Rose of Finland

Diplomatic posts
Preceded by August von Hartmansdorff	Consul/Consul General of Sweden to Montreal; 1956–1960	Succeeded by Ingvar Grauers
Preceded by Hugo Ärnfast	Envoy of Sweden to New Zealand; 1960–1962	Succeeded by Olof Kaijser
Preceded by Louis De Geer	Consul General of Sweden to Antwerp; 1962–1964	Succeeded by Sture Johanson
Preceded by Bo Järnstedt	Ambassador of Sweden to Liberia; 1964–1968	Succeeded by Hans-Efraim Sköld
Preceded by Bo Järnstedt	Ambassador of Sweden to Guinea; 1964–1968	Succeeded by Hans-Efraim Sköld
Preceded by Bo Järnstedt	Ambassador of Sweden to Sierra Leone; 1964–1968	Succeeded by Hans-Efraim Sköld
Preceded by Bo Järnstedt	Ambassador of Sweden to Ghana; 1964–1967	Succeeded by Carl Swartz
Preceded by Karl Henrik Andersson	Ambassador of Sweden to Ivory Coast; 1967–1968	Succeeded by Hans-Efraim Sköld
Preceded by Gunnar Gerring	Ambassador of Sweden to Bulgaria; 1969–1974	Succeeded by Gunnar Ljungdahl
