= List of ambassadors of Sweden to Sierra Leone =

Ambassador of Sweden to Sierra Leone
- Lesser coat of arms of the Kingdom of Sweden
- Incumbent; Karl Backéus since 2024
- Ministry for Foreign Affairs
- Style: His or Her Excellency (formal); Mr. or Madam Ambassador (informal)
- Reports to: Minister for Foreign Affairs
- Seat: Monrovia, Liberia (Note: The Swedish ambassador to Sierra Leone is resident in Monrovia, Liberia.)
- Appointer: Government of Sweden
- Term length: No fixed term
- Formation: August 1961
- First holder: Torsten Brandel

The Ambassador of Sweden to Sierra Leone (known formally as the Ambassador of the Kingdom of Sweden to Republic of Sierra Leone) is the official representative of the government of Sweden to the president of Sierra Leone and government of Sierra Leone. Since Sweden does not have an embassy in Freetown, Sweden's ambassador to Sierra Leone is based in Monrovia, Liberia.

== History ==
In January 1961, the Swedish government budget bill proposed the establishment of at least two diplomatic missions in West Africa. These, it was suggested, should preferably be located in Monrovia and Lagos. The mission in Monrovia would cover not only Liberia but also Sierra Leone, Ghana, and Guinea.

Following the proclamation of Sierra Leone's independence on 27 April 1961, Sven af Geijerstam, Acting Head of the Ministry for Foreign Affairs, stated in a congratulatory telegram to Sierra Leone's Prime Minister, Sir Milton Margai, that the Swedish government recognized Sierra Leone as a sovereign and independent state. He also expressed the Swedish government's desire to maintain friendly and cordial relations with Sierra Leone. At the same time, the Regent, Prince Wilhelm, Duke of Södermanland, sent a congratulatory telegram of his own.

In August 1961, Sweden's ambassador to Liberia, Torsten Brandel, based in Monrovia, was also appointed ambassador to Sierra Leone. In December of that year, he presented his credentials in Freetown, becoming the first Swedish ambassador to Sierra Leone. The Swedish ambassador to Sierra Leone was resident in Monrovia, Liberia, until 1977, when Sweden scaled back its diplomatic presence in Liberia, reflecting shifting foreign-policy priorities.

From 1979 to 1998, an ambassador-at-large, resident in Stockholm, Sweden, was accredited to Sierra Leone as well as to several neighboring countries in West Africa. Thereafter, accreditation was transferred to the Swedish ambassador in Abidjan, Ivory Coast, from 2000 to 2004, when the embassy there closed due to the ongoing Ivorian Civil War. In 2006, responsibility for Sierra Leone was transferred to the Swedish ambassador in Dakar, Senegal. When the embassy there closed in 2010, accreditation to Sierra Leone was once again transferred to an ambassador-at-large resident in Stockholm. From 2013, Sweden once again had a resident ambassador in Monrovia, who in 2021 assumed responsibility for Sierra Leone.

== List of representatives ==
Name	Period	Title	Resident / Concurrent accreditation	Notes	Presented credentials	Ref
Dominion of Sierra Leone (1961–1971)
Torsten Brandel	1961–1962	Ambassador	Resident in Monrovia		December 1961	
Bo Järnstedt	1962 (Note: The Sveriges statskalender (1964), p. 311, lists the year as 1963. However, Dagens Nyheter reported in March 1962 that Järnstedt had already presented his credentials to President William Tubman in Monrovia. Vem är det ("Who's Who") (1984), p. 571, also states the year as 1962.)–1964	Ambassador	Resident in Monrovia			
Olof Ripa	1964–1968	Ambassador	Resident in Monrovia			
Hans-Efraim Sköld	1969–1971	Ambassador	Resident in Monrovia			
Republic of Sierra Leone (1971–present)
Hans-Efraim Sköld	1971–1972	Ambassador	Resident in Monrovia			
Bengt Friedman	1973–1976	Ambassador	Resident in Monrovia			
Olof Skoglund	1976–1977	Ambassador	Resident in Monrovia			
–	1978–1978	Ambassador		Vacant		
Cai Melin	1979–1982	Ambassador	Resident in Stockholm			
Erik Cornell	1983–1988	Ambassador	Resident in Stockholm			
Bengt Holmquist	1989–1992	Ambassador	Resident in Stockholm			
Annie Marie Sundbom	1993–1997	Ambassador	Resident in Stockholm			
Arne Ekfelt	1997–1998	Ambassador	Resident in Stockholm			
–	1999–1999	Ambassador		Vacant		
Göran Ankarberg	2000–2002	Ambassador	Resident in Abidjan			
Inga Björk-Klevby	2002–2005	Ambassador	Resident in Abidjan (Note: The ambassador returned to Stockholm in November 2004 after the embassy was closed during the ongoing Ivorian Civil War.)			
Agneta Bohman	2006–2010	Ambassador	Resident in Dakar			
Carin Wall	2010–?	Ambassador	Resident in Stockholm			
Per Carlson	2012–2017	Ambassador	Resident in Stockholm		5 June 2012	
Maria Leissner	2017–2021	Ambassador	Resident in Stockholm	Political appointee (non-career diplomat)		
Urban Sjöström	2021–2024	Ambassador	Resident in Monrovia		25 August 2022	
Karl Backéus	2024–present	Ambassador	Resident in Monrovia			
