= Karl Henrik Andersson =

Swedish diplomat (1918–1998)

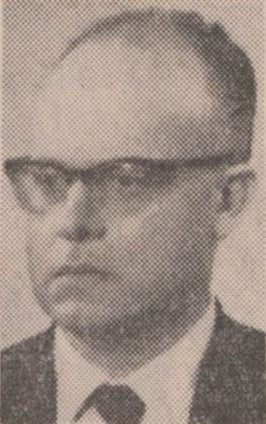
- Andersson c. 1960s
- Born: 3 September 1918; Mannheim, Germany
- Died: 23 January 1998 (aged 79); Stockholm, Sweden
- Education: Uppsala University
- Occupation: Diplomat
- Years active: 1943–1984
- Spouse(s): Evalyn Black (m. 1950; died 1974) Dorothy Boden (m. 1976)

Karl Henrik Andersson (3 September 1918 – 23 January 1998) was a Swedish diplomat. Andersson had a long diplomatic career spanning four decades. He began as an attaché at the Ministry for Foreign Affairs in 1943 and served in key postings in Washington, D.C., London, and Stockholm, where he was promoted to first secretary in 1953. He held positions as consul in Casablanca and Houston, where he became consul general in 1963.

As ambassador, Andersson represented Sweden in Abidjan (1963–1967), Wellington (1967–1969), Jakarta and Manila (1969–1973), and Kinshasa (1979–1982), with accreditations to several African nations. He also served as consul general in Chicago (1973–1976) and contributed to trade negotiations as an expert delegate. His final assignment was at the Foreign Ministry in Stockholm while retaining his ambassadorial role in Kinshasa and other posts.

== Early life ==
Andersson was born on 3 September 1918 in Mannheim, Germany, the son of Henrik Andersson, a merchant, and his German wife Maria (née Schamari). He had two brothers, Gösta and Erik. He graduated as a reserve officer in 1939 and received a Master of Social Science degree from the Uppsala University in 1943.

== Career ==
Andersson began his career as an attaché at the Ministry for Foreign Affairs in Stockholm in 1943. He served in Washington, D.C. from 1944 to 1948 and in London from 1948 to 1950, before returning to the Foreign Ministry in Stockholm between 1950 and 1955. In 1953, he was promoted to first secretary. He went on to serve as consul in Casablanca from 1955 to 1958 and in Houston from 1958 to 1963, where he was appointed consul general in 1963. From 1964 to 1967, Andersson served as ambassador in Abidjan, Ivory Coast, with additional accreditations to Dahomey, Mali, Niger, and Upper Volta.

He was then appointed ambassador in Wellington, New Zealand, from 1967 to 1969, followed by Jakarta, Indonesia, and concurrently Manila, Philippines, from 1969 to 1973. From 1973 to 1976, he held the position of consul general in Chicago. He returned to the Foreign Ministry in Stockholm from 1976 to 1979.

In 1979, Andersson was appointed ambassador in Kinshasa, Zaire (now the Democratic Republic of Congo), with additional accreditations to Gabon and Cameroon from 1980, as well as the People's Republic of the Congo and the Central African Republic from 1983. In November 1982, he was reassigned to the Foreign Ministry in Stockholm while retaining his ambassadorial position in Kinshasa and other accredited posts.

Andersson also served as an expert delegate in trade negotiations during his career.

== Personal life ==
In 1950, Andersson married Evalyn Black (died 1974), the daughter of William Black and Pearle (née Cotton). In 1976, he married Dorothy Boden (born 1917), the daughter of Linus Boden and Amanda (née Eklund).

== Death ==
Andersson died on 23 January 1998 in Stockholm, Sweden. He was interred at Stambaugh Cemetery in Iron River, Michigan, US.

== Awards and decorations ==
=== Swedish ===
- (Sweden) Commander of the Order of the Polar Star (6 June 1970)
- (Sweden) Knight of the Order of the Polar Star

=== Foreign ===
- Commander of the National Order of the Ivory Coast (14 June 1967)
- (Denmark) Knight of the Order of the Dannebrog
- (Iceland) Knight's Cross of the Order of the Falcon

Diplomatic posts
Preceded by Max Pierre Voisin	Consul of Sweden to Casablanca; 1955–1958	Succeeded by Ebbe Nilsson
Preceded by Gunnar Dryselius	Consul/Consul General of Sweden to Houston; 1958–1963	Succeeded by Tore Högstedt
Preceded by Bo Järnstedt	Ambassador of Sweden to Ivory Coast; 1964–1967	Succeeded by Olof Ripa
Preceded by Love Kellberg	Ambassador of Sweden to Dahomey; 1964–1967	Succeeded by Carl Swartz
Preceded by None	Ambassador of Sweden to Mali; 1964–1967	Succeeded by Claës König
Preceded by None	Ambassador of Sweden to Niger; 1964–1967	Succeeded by Carl Swartz
Preceded by None	Ambassador of Sweden to Upper Volta; 1964–1967	Succeeded by Carl Swartz
Preceded by Olof Kaijser	Ambassador of Sweden to New Zealand; 1967–1969	Succeeded by Carl-Gustaf Béve
Preceded by Harald Edelstam	Ambassador of Sweden to Indonesia; 1969–1973	Succeeded by Cai Melin
Preceded by Harald Edelstam	Ambassador of Sweden to the Philippines; 1969–1973	Succeeded by Cai Melin
Preceded by Bo Järnstedt	Consul General of Sweden to Chicago; 1973–1976	Succeeded by Tore Högstedt
Preceded by Ragnar Petri	Ambassador of Sweden to Zaire; 1979–1984	Succeeded by Olof Skoglund
Preceded by Ragnar Petri	Ambassador of Sweden to People's Republic of the Congo; 1979–1984	Succeeded by Olof Skoglund
Preceded by Ragnar Petri	Ambassador of Sweden to Gabon; 1980–1984	Succeeded by Olof Skoglund
Preceded by Ragnar Petri	Ambassador of Sweden to Cameroon; 1980–1984	Succeeded by Olof Skoglund
Preceded by None	Ambassador of Sweden to Central African Republic; 1983–1984	Succeeded by Olof Skoglund
