= Bengt Westerberg =

Swedish politician (born 1943)

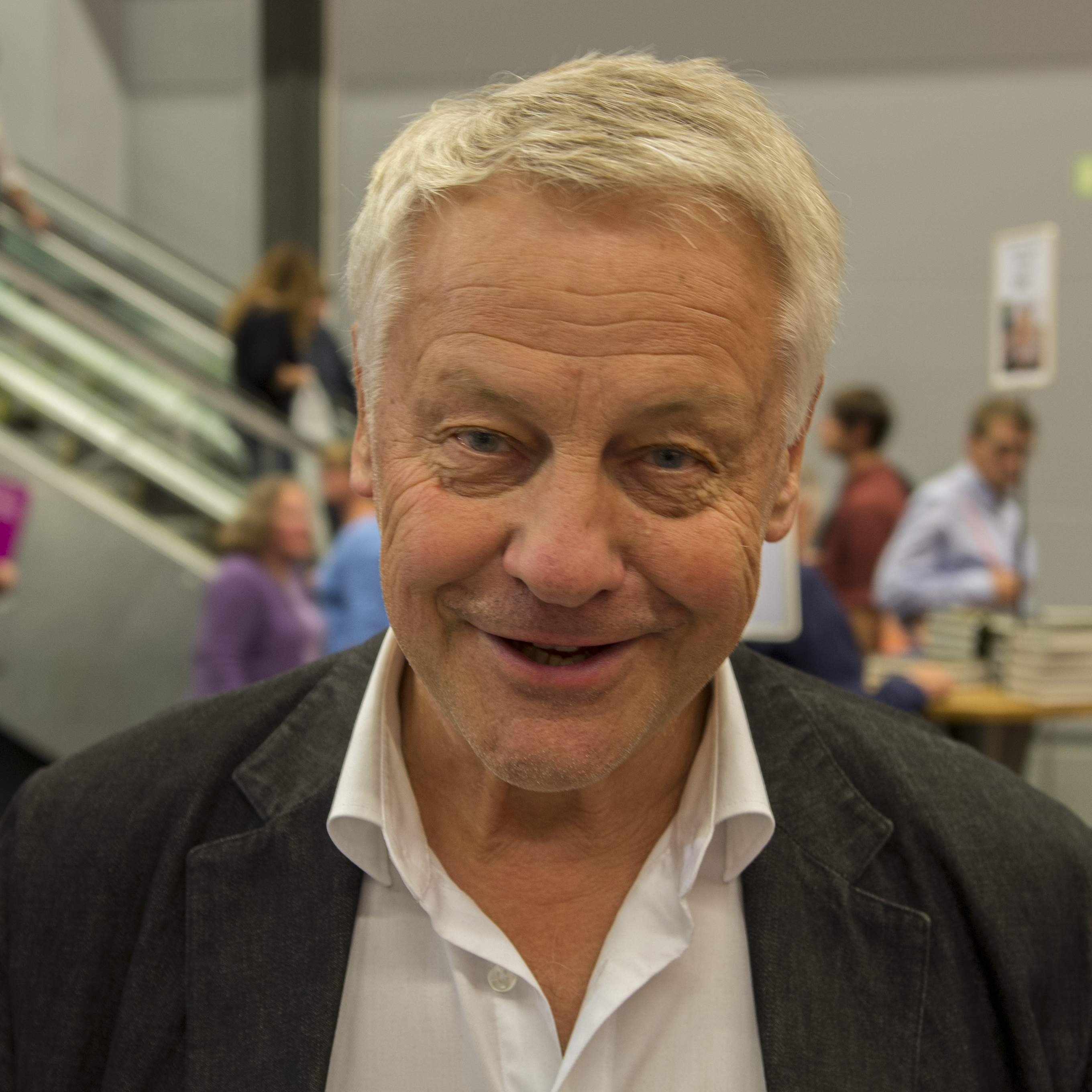
- Westerberg in 2013

Deputy Prime Minister of Sweden
- In office 4 October 1991 – 7 October 1994
- Prime Minister: Carl Bildt
- Preceded by: Odd Engström
- Succeeded by: Mona Sahlin

Minister for Social Affairs
- In office 4 October 1991 – 7 October 1994
- Prime Minister: Carl Bildt
- Preceded by: Ingela Thalén
- Succeeded by: Ingela Thalén

Minister for Gender Equality
- In office 1993 – 7 October 1994
- Prime Minister: Carl Bildt
- Preceded by: Birgit Friggebo
- Succeeded by: Mona Sahlin

Leader of the Liberal People's Party
- In office 1 October 1983 – 4 February 1995
- Preceded by: Ola Ullsten
- Succeeded by: Maria Leissner

Member of the Swedish Parliament for Stockholms län
- In office 1984–1994

Personal details
- Born: Bengt Carl Gustaf Westerberg; 23 August 1943 (age 83) Solna, Sweden
- Party: Liberals (before 2022); Centre Party (2022–present)
- Education: Karolinska Institute; Stockholm University

Bengt Carl Gustaf Westerberg (born 23 August 1943) is a Swedish politician. He was leader of the Liberal People's Party from 1983 to 1995, member of the Riksdag from 1984 to 1994 and Minister for Social Affairs and Deputy Prime Minister 1991 to 1994.

== Biography ==
Westerberg is the son of Carl-Erik Westerberg and his wife Barbro (née Wahlström). He graduated from high school in 1962, finished an associate degree in medicine at Karolinska Institute in 1964 and a bachelor's degree in economics and philosophy at Stockholm University in 1974.

Westerberg worked as political secretary to one of the city commissioners in Stockholm Municipality from 1969 to 1970 and then as political secretary in Stockholm County Council from 1971 to 1972, where he then worked on traffic issues from 1972 to 1975. He worked as a political assistant in the Ministry of Employment from 1976 to 1978, where Per Ahlmark was minister and simultaneously the Liberal People's Party's leader. During the Ullsten Cabinet from 1978 to 1979, Westerberg was state secretary at the Ministry for Industry, where Erik Huss was minister. From 1979 to 1982 he was state secretary at the Ministry for Budget in the Fälldin II and Fälldin III cabinets, under ministers Ingemar Mundebo and Rolf Wirtén.

The 1982 election led to a change in government, and the worst election result so far for the Liberal People's Party (5.9 per cent). In 1983 Westerberg was the head of office of a foundation promoting free market solutions, where he worked together with Carl Bildt of the Moderate Party, and wrote for the business weekly Affärsvärlden. He was elected to the board of the Liberal People's Party in May 1983, and shortly thereafter party leader Ola Ullsten chose to resign. In October 1983, Westerberg was appointed party leader. He became a member of parliament in 1984, when Ullsten resigned from his seat.

In the 1985 election, the Liberal People's Party received 14.2 per cent of the votes, a higher support than in any of the previous four elections, following a quick increase in popularity in the weeks leading up to the election. This was branded "the Westerberg effect" by the media. In the 1988 election the ruling Social Democrats branded the Liberal People's Party (rather than the Moderate Party) and Westerberg the main opponents of their campaign.

In October 1990 Westerberg and the Moderate Party leader Carl Bildt published an article where they declared that they wanted to govern together after next year's election. In early 1991, a common election platform was adopted, called "New start for Sweden" (Ny start för Sverige). While all modern era centre-right governments in Sweden had been coalition governments, this level of cooperation ahead of an election was unusual for Swedish parties. In the 1991 election, the traditional centre-right parties got more support than the Social Democrats and the Left Party, but not an outright majority as newly founded populist party New Democracy managed to get 6.7 per cent of the votes. Westerberg had declared ahead of the election that he did not want to be part of a government that needed New Democracy's support, and on the election night (when he had seen his party reduced to 9.1 per cent support) he refused to stay in the TV studio when New Democracy's Ian Wachtmeister and Bert Karlsson entered it. Westerberg advocated a broad coalition between the Social Democrats, Moderate Party and Liberal People's Party, but the two other parties were not interested in forming a left-right government. Instead, the four-party centre-right Bildt Cabinet was formed, also including the Centre Party and the Christian Democrats, which needed the passive support of New Democracy in parliament. As the party leader of the second largest party, Westerberg was appointed Deputy Prime Minister and was simultaneously Minister for Social Affairs.

In the 1994 election, the government lost their majority and the Liberal People's Party got 7.2 per cent of the votes. Westerberg then resigned as party leader and was succeeded by Maria Leissner in February 1995.

Westerberg holds office as the Deputy President of the International Federation of Red Cross and Red Crescent Societies in Geneva, Switzerland and is chairman of the Swedish Red Cross.

Westerberg is an atheist and humanist.

He is twice divorced, with two daughters, Hanna Nordh (maiden name Westerberg) and Malin Westerberg from the first marriage and a son, Jacob Westerberg, from his second marriage with Marie Ehrling.

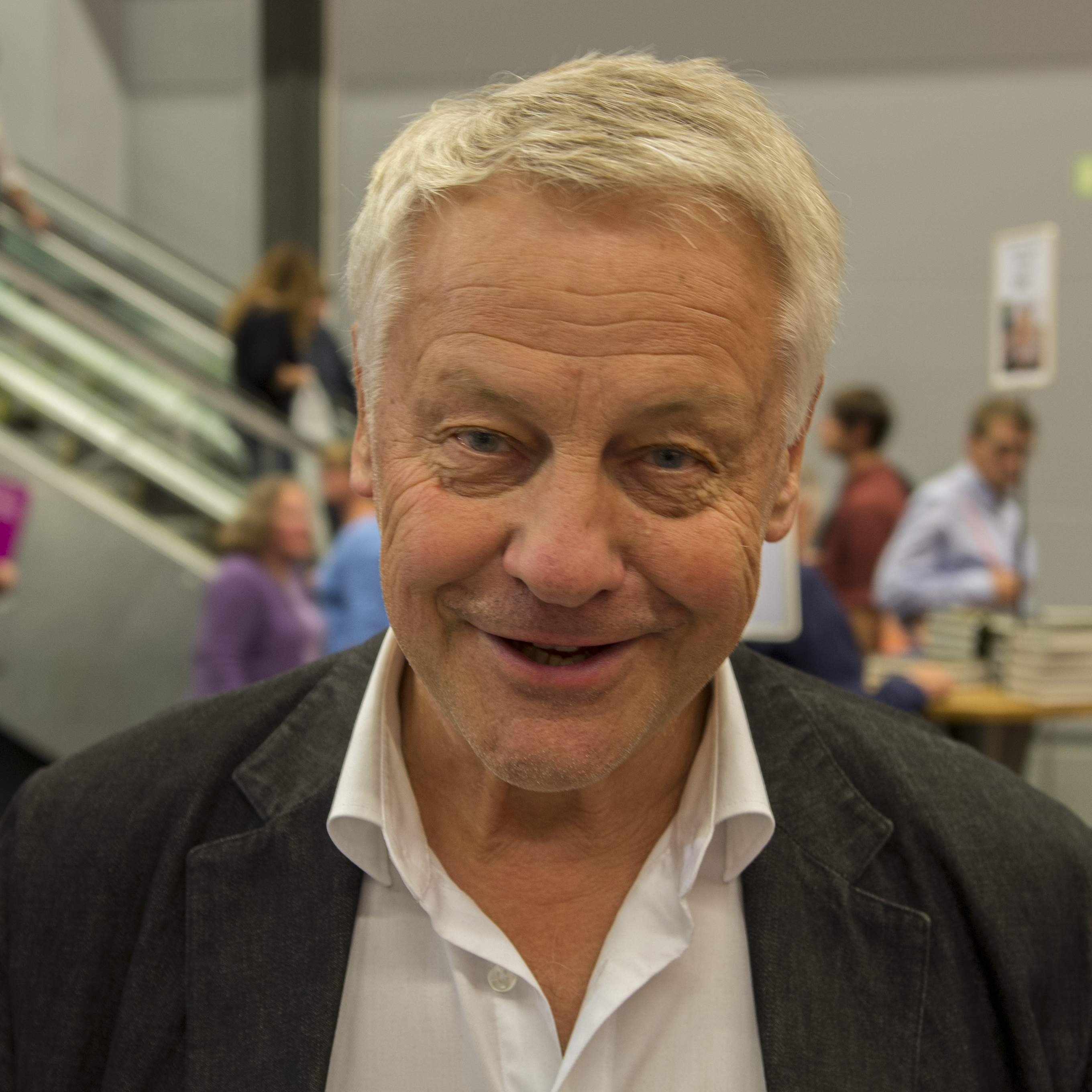
Bengt Westerberg in 2013

== Bibliography ==
- Minus 100 miljarder : vägar att spara på statens utgifter (1983)
- Välfärdsstatens vägval och villkor (1993)
- Den liberala välfärdsstaten (1994)
- Han, hon, den, det : om genus och kön (1998)
- Har vi råd med äldrevård när 40-talisterna blir gamla? (2000)
- Var det verkligen bättre förr? : en självbiografisk resa (2012)

Party political offices
Preceded by Ola Ullsten	Leader of the Swedish Liberal People's Party; 1983—1995	Succeeded by Maria Leissner
