= Torsten Brandel =

Swedish diplomat (1912–1989)

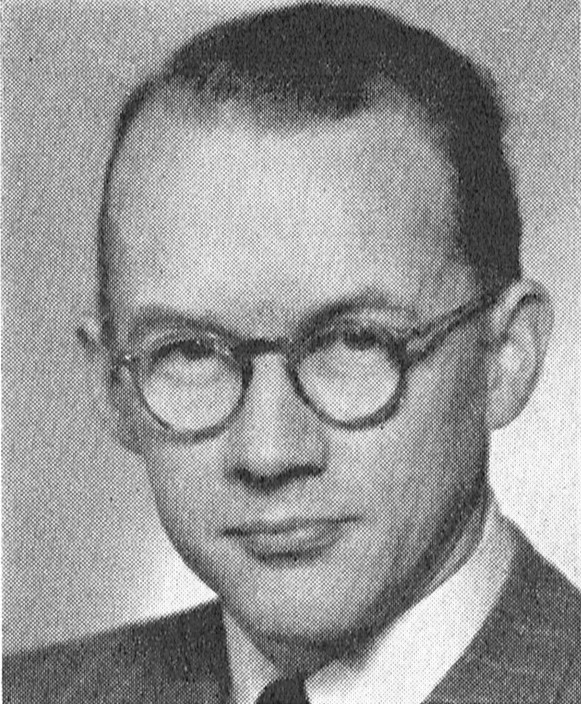
- Born: Karl Torsten Brandel; 15 February 1912; Stockholm, Sweden
- Died: 10 December 1989 (aged 77); Stockholm, Sweden
- Education: Södra Latin; Stockholm University College
- Occupation: Diplomat
- Years active: 1937–1983
- Spouse: Karin Lovén (m. 1945)
- Children: 1

Karl Torsten Brandel (15 February 1912 – 10 December 1989) was a Swedish diplomat. He entered the Ministry for Foreign Affairs in 1937, with early postings in London, Dublin, and Berlin, where during the Second World War he assisted Count Folke Bernadotte in the Swedish Red Cross rescue mission and attended negotiations with Heinrich Himmler.

After 1945 he served with the British occupation authorities in Hamburg and later held consular posts in San Francisco, Chicago, Danzig, and Copenhagen. In 1954 he became Sweden’s first career consul in Hong Kong, later also covering Macau, and in 1956 was promoted to consul general. He was ambassador to Colombia, with additional accreditation to Panama and Ecuador, from 1958, and in 1961 was appointed Sweden’s first resident ambassador in Liberia, also accredited to several West African states. From 1964 to 1969 he was ambassador to Hungary, after which he held senior positions at the Ministry in Stockholm, including head of the Reporting Secretariat. In the late 1970s and early 1980s he worked on international energy issues.

Brandel also wrote on history, foreign policy, and military affairs, and published a book on California in 1953.

== Early life ==
Brandel was born on 15 February 1912 in Stockholm, Sweden, the son of Colonel Manne Brandel and Karin Ekholm. His grandfather was the priest Gustaf Brandel (1846–1931), his uncle was the civil servant Elias Brandel (1884–1966), and his cousin was the lawyer Anders Brandel (1924–2006). He had two sisters, Birgit Rudebeck and Barbro Lilliehöök.

He completed his reserve officer’s training in 1932 and received a Bachelor of Arts degree from Stockholm University College on 3 November 1934, followed by a law degree (kansliexamen) on 15 december 1936. During his studies, he served as chairman of the Swedish Foreign Policy Association (Utrikespolitiska föreningen).

== Career ==
Brandel entered the Swedish diplomatic service in 1937 as an attaché at the Ministry for Foreign Affairs, with his first postings at the Consulate General in London and then in Dublin the following year. He returned to London in 1939 to serve at the Swedish legation, and in 1941 was appointed acting second secretary. By 1944 he had advanced to second secretary at the Ministry and was soon posted to Berlin as acting first legation secretary. In Berlin he held a special role as deputy to Count Folke Bernadotte, vice chairman of the Swedish Red Cross and leader of the Swedish rescue mission in Germany, accompanying him during several of his negotiations with Reichsführer-SS Heinrich Himmler.

With the war over, Brandel was assigned as Sweden’s representative to the British occupation authorities in Hamburg in 1945. The following year he crossed the Atlantic to serve as first vice consul in San Francisco, and in 1948 became acting consul general in Chicago. That same year he returned to Stockholm as first secretary at the Ministry, before being posted as vice consul in Danzig in 1950 and then to Copenhagen in 1951 as first legation secretary with the rank of counsellor.

A turning point in his career came in 1954, when he was appointed Sweden’s first career consul in Hong Kong, replacing the honorary consulate with a permanent professional post. The following year his responsibilities expanded to include Macau, and in 1956 he was promoted to consul general in Hong Kong. Two years later, in 1958, he moved to Latin America as ambassador to Colombia, also accredited to Panama and Ecuador.

In May 1961, Brandel became Sweden’s first resident ambassador in Monrovia, Liberia, with additional accreditation to several West African capitals, including Abidjan, Accra, Conakry, and Freetown. After a year in West Africa, he returned to Stockholm, where he undertook special assignments for the Ministry. In 1964 he was appointed ambassador to Hungary, serving in Budapest until 1969. He later headed the Ministry’s Reporting Secretariat from 1974 and, between 1976 and 1978, worked directly under the minister for foreign affairs. In the final phase of his career, from 1978 to 1983, he was active both officially and privately in international energy matters.

== Personal life ==
In 1945, Brandel married Karin Lovén (1915–1998), daughter of insurance director Tryggve Lovén and Ruth (née von Dahn). They had one son, Peter, born in 1950. Karin Brandel was among the founders of the Friends of Rosendal Garden Association (Vänföreningen Rosendals Trädgård).

Brandel also cultivated a parallel career as a writer and commentator. In 1953 he published Guld och röda skogar (“Gold and Red Forests”), a book on the history of California. He was a regular contributor to the Kungliga Krigsvetenskapsakademins Tidskrift and wrote widely in both Swedish and international journals on military and foreign policy issues, as well as on theater and sport. On radio and television he often spoke about his time in Germany at the end of the Second World War, when he assisted Count Folke Bernadotte in the rescue mission known as the White Buses.

He frequently took part in debates at the Swedish Institute of International Affairs and the Swedish Publicists' Association. One of his particular areas of expertise was international oil policy and its implications for Sweden’s energy supply, a subject on which he lectured and contributed to public discussions.

Outside his professional life, Brandel had a keen interest in sports, especially athletics, skating, and horse racing. He was also a devoted supporter of AIK.

== Death ==
Brandel died on 10 December 1989 in Stockholm. The funeral service was held on 22 December 1989 at Djurgården Church in Djurgården, Stockholm. He was interred on 12 February 1990 at Norra begravningsplatsen in Solna, Sweden.

== Awards and decorations ==
- (Sweden) Commander of the Order of the Polar Star (3 December 1974)
- (Sweden) Knight of the Order of the Polar Star (1958)
- (Denmark) Commander of the Order of the Dannebrog
- (Norway) Knight 1st Class of the Order of St. Olav
- (Colombia) Grand Cross of the Order of San Carlos

== Bibliography ==
- Brandel, Torsten (1953). Guld och röda skogar: en bok om Kalifornien [Gold and red forests: a book about California] (in Swedish). Stockholm: Natur o. kultur. SELIBR 1435388.
- Brandel, Torsten (1964). Hongkong [Hong Kong] (in Swedish). Stockholm: Utrikespolitiska institutet. SELIBR 646558.
- Brandel, Torsten (1979). Oljan [The oil]. Vandringar med böcker, 0503-6968 ; 28, 1979:6 (in Swedish). Lund: Bibliotekstjänst. SELIBR 194682.

Diplomatic posts
Preceded by Cedric Blaker as Honorary consul	Consul (General) of Sweden to Hong Kong; 1954–1958	Succeeded by Torsten Björck
Preceded by Leif Öhrvall	Ambassador of Sweden to Colombia; 1958–1961	Succeeded by Curt Leijon
Preceded by Leif Öhrvall	Ambassador of Sweden to the Ecuador; 1958–1961	Succeeded by Curt Leijon
Preceded by Leif Öhrvall	Ambassador of Sweden to Panama; 1958–1961	Succeeded by Curt Leijon
Preceded by Alexis Aminoff	Ambassador of Sweden to Liberia; 1961–1962	Succeeded by Bo Järnstedt
Preceded by None	Ambassador of Sweden to Ivory Coast; 1961–1962	Succeeded by Bo Järnstedt
Preceded by None	Ambassador of Sweden to Ghana; 1961–1962	Succeeded by Bo Järnstedt
Preceded by None	Ambassador of Sweden to Guinea; 1961–1962	Succeeded by Bo Järnstedt
Preceded by None	Ambassador of Sweden to Sierra Leone; 1961–1962	Succeeded by Bo Järnstedt
Preceded by Harry Bagge	Ambassador of Sweden to Hungary; 1964–1969	Succeeded by Sigge Lilliehöök
