= List of ambassadors of Sweden to the Central African Republic =

Ambassador of Sweden to the Central African Republic
- Lesser coat of arms of the Kingdom of Sweden
- Ministry for Foreign Affairs; Swedish Embassy, Kampala
- Style: His or Her Excellency (formal); Mr. or Madam Ambassador (informal)
- Reports to: Minister for Foreign Affairs
- Seat: Kampala, Uganda (Note: The Swedish ambassador in Kampala, Uganda is also accredited in Bangui.)
- Appointer: Government of Sweden
- Term length: No fixed term
- Formation: 1983
- First holder: Karl Henrik Andersson

The Ambassador of Sweden to the Central African Republic (known formally as the Ambassador of the Kingdom of Sweden to the Central African Republic) is the official representative of the government of Sweden to the president of the Central African Republic and government of the Central African Republic. Since Sweden does not have an embassy in Bangui, Sweden's ambassador in Kampala, Uganda, is also accredited to Bangui, the capital of the Central African Republic.

== History ==
On the occasion of the Central African Republic's declaration of independence on 13 August 1960, the acting Minister for Foreign Affairs, Ragnar Edenman, sent a congratulatory telegram to its president and head of government, David Dacko. In the telegram, he stated that the Swedish government recognized the Central African Republic as a sovereign and independent state and expressed hopes for friendly and cordial relations between the two countries. At the same time, a congratulatory telegram was also sent by King Gustaf VI Adolf.

In 1983, Sweden appointed its first ambassador accredited to Bangui, the capital of the Central African Republic. The post was a Stockholm-based ambassador-at-large position that was accredited to a number of different countries in Central Africa, including the Central African Republic. Since 2001, the ambassador has been resident in a nearby African capital. Since 2017, the ambassador has been resident in Kampala, Uganda.

== List of representatives ==
Name	Period	Title	Resident / Concurrent accreditation	Notes	Presented credentials	Ref
Karl Henrik Andersson	1983–1984	Ambassador	Resident in Stockholm			
Olof Skoglund	1985–1990	Ambassador	Resident in Stockholm			
Bengt Rösiö	1990–1992	Ambassador	Resident in Stockholm			
Carl-Erhard Lindahl	1992–2001	Ambassador	Resident in Stockholm			
Robert Rydberg	2001–2003	Ambassador	Resident in Kinshasa			
Magnus Wemstedt	2004–2007	Ambassador	Resident in Kinshasa			
Helena Rietz	2007–2008	Ambassador	Resident in Kinshasa			
–	2008–2010	Ambassador		Vacant		
Johan Borgstam	2010–2011	Ambassador	Resident in Kinshasa			
?	2011–2013	Ambassador				
Mette Sunnergren	2013–2016	Ambassador	Resident in Khartoum		December 2014	
Per Lindgärde	2017–2021	Ambassador	Resident in Kampala		20 June 2017	
Maria Håkansson	2021–2026	Ambassador	Resident in Kampala		5 November 2024	
