= Bengt Friedman =

Swedish diplomat (1923–2008)

- Born: 15 June 1923; Stockholm, Sweden
- Died: 24 November 2008 (aged 85); Viken, Sweden
- Education: Stockholm School of Economics
- Occupation: Diplomat
- Years active: 1948–1988
- Spouse: Märta Trulsson (m. 1924)

Bengt Friedman (15 June 1923 – 24 November 2008) was a Swedish diplomat. Friedman served as ambassador of Sweden for over two decades. Throughout his diplomatic career, Friedman served as the Ambassador of Sweden to Argentina, the Holy See, Uruguay, Malta, Liberia, the Ivory Coast, Guinea, Sierra Leone, Cape Verde, Ethiopia, Madagascar, and Mauritius. He also held the position of consul general in New York City from 1978 to 1983, where he lived at Sweden's Park Avenue residence.

== Early life and education ==
Friedman was born on 15 June 1923 in Stockholm, Sweden, the son of director Sam Friedman and his wife Märtha (née Wanger). He graduated from Stockholm School of Economics in 1944.

== Career ==
Friedman began his career as an attaché at the Ministry for Foreign Affairs in Stockholm in 1948. He was posted to Warsaw in 1950 and Caracas in 1951, and served as acting chargé d'affaires in Bogotá in 1952. Returning to the Ministry in 1954, he became a second secretary and was promoted to first secretary in 1959. In 1960, he was appointed first secretary at the Swedish OEEC delegation in Paris and later the EFTA delegation in Geneva. By 1963, he had advanced to counselor at Sweden's Permanent Delegation in Geneva.

In 1964, he became a director (byråchef) at the Ministry for Foreign Affairs, followed by a role as deputy director (kansliråd) in 1965. In 1968, he was appointed trade counselor in Bonn and elevated to minister in 1970. From 1973, he served as ambassador to Monrovia, Abidjan, Conakry, and Freetown, adding Bissau and Praia in 1974, and later Addis Ababa, Aden, Antananarivo, from 1976, and Port Louis from 1977.

In 1978, Friedman was named consul general in New York City, where he hosted numerous prominent public figures and Nobel laureates, including Fritz Albert Lipmann, André Frédéric Cournand, Severo Ochoa, Stanford Moore, Tjalling Koopmans, James Watson, and Alfred Hershey.

He went on to serve as ambassador to Buenos Aires and Montevideo from 1983 to 1986, followed by postings as ambassador to the Holy See from 1986 to 1988 and Malta from 1987 to 1988.

== Personal life ==
In 1951, Friedman married Märta Trulson (1924–2022), the daughter of lay judge Gustaf Trulson and Anna (née Svensson).

After his retirement, Friedman and his wife settled in Viken. Friedman was active in Cabinet Skåne, an association for retired foreign ministry officials living in Scania.

== Death ==
Friedman died on 24 November 2008. He was interred on 1 October 2009 at Viken New Cemetery in Viken, Höganäs Municipality.

== Awards and decorations ==
- (Sweden) For Zealous and Devoted Service of the Realm (22 August 1979)
- (Sweden) Knight of the Order of the Polar Star (1967)
- (Venezuela) Commander of the Order of the Liberator

Diplomatic posts
Preceded by Hans-Efraim Sköld	Ambassador of Sweden to Liberia; 1973–1976	Succeeded by Olof Skoglund
Preceded by Hans-Efraim Sköld	Ambassador of Sweden to Ivory Coast; 1973–1976	Succeeded by Olof Skoglund
Preceded by Hans-Efraim Sköld	Ambassador of Sweden to Guinea; 1973–1976	Succeeded by Olof Skoglund
Preceded by Hans-Efraim Sköld	Ambassador of Sweden to Sierra Leone; 1973–1976	Succeeded by Olof Skoglund
Preceded by None	Ambassador of Sweden to Cape Verde; 1974–1976	Succeeded by Olof Skoglund
Preceded by None	Ambassador of Sweden to Guinea-Bissau; 1975–1976	Succeeded by Olof Skoglund
Preceded by Lars Hedström	Ambassador of Sweden to Ethiopia; 1976–1978	Succeeded by Arne Helleryd
Preceded by Lars Hedström	Ambassador of Sweden to Madagascar; 1976–1978	Succeeded by Arne Helleryd
Preceded by Lars Hedström	Ambassador of Sweden to South Yemen; 1976–1978	Succeeded by Arne Helleryd
Preceded by None	Ambassador of Sweden to Mauritius; 1977–1978	Succeeded by Arne Helleryd
Preceded by Carl-Henric Nauckhoff	Consul General of Sweden to New York City; 1978–1983	Succeeded by Magnus Faxén
Preceded by Lars Karlström	Ambassador of Sweden to Argentina; 1983–1986	Succeeded by Ethel Wiklund
Preceded by Lars Karlström	Ambassador of Sweden to Uruguay; 1983–1986	Succeeded by Ethel Wiklund
Preceded by Gunnar Ljungdahl	Ambassador of Sweden to the Holy See; 1986–1988	Succeeded by Lars Bergquist
Preceded by Eric Virgin	Ambassador of Sweden to Malta; 1987–1988	Succeeded by Lars Bergquist
