= Martin Skoglund =

Swedish politician

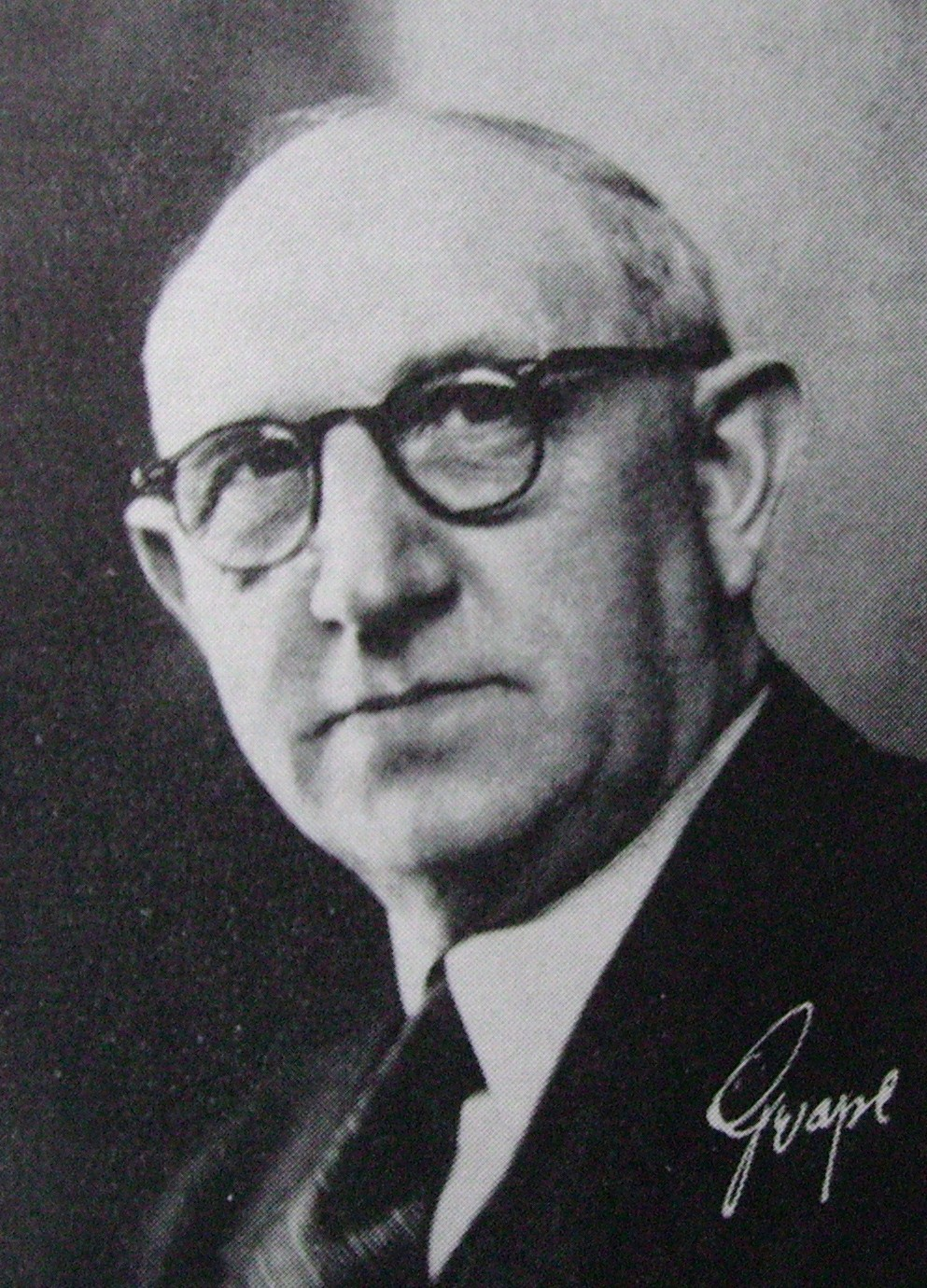
Martin Skoglund

John "Martin" Skoglund (2 September 1892 in Risinge, Östergötland- 6 December 1976 in Norrköping) was a Swedish politician and member of the Moderate Party. He was known by the nickname "Doverstorparen".

Skoglund was the son of Karl Jonas Skoglund and his wife Stina Lisa Olofsdotter. Between 1911 and 1912, he studied at a folkhögskola and lantmannaskola and at an early age he worked and lived at a farm in Doverstorp. In 1917, he married the farmer's daughter Elsa Andersson with whom he had two children.

In 1919, Skoglund was elected to the Risinge municipal council and was soon one of the leading men of the council. From 1923 to 1928, he was the chairman of the Board of Poor Relief (Fattigvårdsstyrelsen). In 1928, he was a candidate for the second chamber election and was elected thanks to Moderate Party's Arvid Lindmans victorious election in late 1928.

In Riksdagen Skoglund profiled himself as a right-wing social policy expert and was responsible for social policy decisions. Other questions that interested him were farming, defence and taxes.

He retired in 1960 from the Riksdagen.
