= List of ambassadors of Sweden to Liberia =

Ambassador of Sweden to Liberia
- Lesser coat of arms of the Kingdom of Sweden
- Incumbent; Karl Backéus since 2024
- Ministry for Foreign Affairs; Swedish Embassy, Monrovia
- Style: His or Her Excellency (formal); Mr. or Madam Ambassador (informal)
- Reports to: Minister for Foreign Affairs
- Seat: Monrovia, Liberia
- Appointer: Government of Sweden
- Term length: No fixed term
- Inaugural holder: Knut Richard Thyberg
- Formation: 3 October 1958
- Website: Swedish Embassy, Monrovia

The Ambassador of Sweden to Liberia (known formally as the Ambassador of the Kingdom of Sweden to the Republic of Liberia) is the official representative of the government of Sweden to the president of Liberia and government of Liberia. Sweden established diplomatic relations with Liberia in 1958, initially through its ambassador in Portugal, who was also accredited to Liberia. In 1961, Sweden opened its first resident embassy in Monrovia, reflecting its growing economic and political interest in the region, particularly linked to its investment in LAMCO, a major iron ore mining project. From the 1970s, Sweden scaled back its diplomatic presence in Liberia, with the ambassador based in Stockholm and a junior diplomat managing day-to-day operations in Monrovia. The embassy closed during the Liberian Civil War in 1990, with Liberian affairs managed remotely or through ambassadors based in other West African capitals. Sweden reopened its embassy in Monrovia in 2010, with a chargé d'affaires leading the mission until 2013, when a resident ambassador was again appointed.

== History ==
On 3 October 1958, Sweden's ambassador to Portugal, Knut Richard Thyberg, was appointed as envoy extraordinary and minister plenipotentiary to be accredited in Liberia as well. He presented his credentials to President William Tubman in November of the same year. In November 1959, an agreement was reached between the Swedish and Liberian governments on the mutual elevation of the respective countries' legations to embassies. The diplomatic rank was thereafter changed to ambassador instead of envoy extraordinary and minister plenipotentiary. In connection with this, Ambassador Alexis Aminoff in Lisbon was appointed as Sweden's ambassador to Monrovia.

In January 1961, Sweden planned to establish three new diplomatic missions in Africa, including an independent mission in Liberia. The proposed mission in Monrovia was intended to serve not only Liberia but also Ghana, Guinea, and Sierra Leone. A delegation recommended setting up at least two missions in West Africa, prioritizing Monrovia and Lagos. Additionally, a third mission was suggested for one of the French-speaking West African republics, such as Dakar or Abidjan. Until further expansions, the head of the Monrovia mission was to be accredited to some former French republics. These proposals were part of Sweden's efforts to strengthen economic ties and were reflected in that year's budget proposal. On 26 May 1961, Torsten Brandel was appointed as Sweden's first resident ambassador in Monrovia. In August he was also appointed ambassador to neighboring countries. Brandel presented his credentials in Monrovia on 20 September 1961.

Sweden maintained an embassy in Liberia primarily due to its investment in the Liberian American–Swedish Minerals Company (LAMCO), which mined iron ore from 1963 to 1989. This investment was the largest Swedish commercial project in Africa during the Cold War, blending industrial and political interests. Between 1955 and 1965, Swedish foreign policy strongly supported LAMCO, combining industrial and diplomatic efforts to protect its operations and boost Sweden's global prestige. The embassy in Monrovia, established in 1961, managed these interests and portrayed LAMCO as a development-focused initiative, enhancing Sweden's image as neutral and progressive. Vocational training projects were framed as aid, though critics noted the overlap between private and national interests. By the mid-1960s, shifting theories and public opinion prioritized political conditions in aid-receiving nations. Liberia, seen as undemocratic and aligned with LAMCO, no longer fit Sweden's focus. Aid ended in 1972, but business ties kept the Monrovia embassy open until 1990.

From the 1970s onward, Sweden scaled back its diplomatic presence in Liberia, reflecting shifting priorities in foreign policy. While the ambassador to Liberia was primarily based in Stockholm, the embassy in Monrovia was headed by a junior diplomat who managed day-to-day operations. This arrangement allowed Sweden to maintain a minimal presence in Liberia, supporting business interests such as those linked to LAMCO, while reducing on-site diplomatic staff in regions deemed less critical to Sweden's evolving international objectives. The ambassador handled Liberian affairs remotely, with periodic visits to Monrovia, focusing on maintaining bilateral relations and overseeing residual Swedish activities in the country.

After the outbreak of the Liberian Civil War in December 1989, the Swedish embassy was closed on 1 March 1990. The ambassador continued to be based in Stockholm until 1998. From 1999 to 2005, the Swedish ambassador in Abidjan was accredited to Monrovia, and from 2006 to 2010, the Swedish ambassador in Dakar held this accreditation. Between 2010 and 2013, the ambassador was once again based in Stockholm.

The embassy reopened on 14 December 2010. The embassy was subsequently led by a chargé d'affaires ad interim as the ambassador remained stationed in Stockholm. In 2013, Sofia Strand was appointed as the new ambassador in Monrovia, marking a transition for Sweden from having an ambassador based in Stockholm to having an ambassador stationed on-site in Monrovia.

== List of representatives ==
Name	Period	Resident / Non-resident	Title	Resident / Concurrent accreditation	Notes	Presented credentials	Ref
Knut Richard Thyberg	3 October 1958 – 1959	Non-resident	Envoy extraordinary and minister plenipotentiary	Resident in Lisbon		November 1958	
Alexis Aminoff	November 1959 – 1961	Non-resident	Ambassador	Resident in Lisbon			
Torsten Brandel	26 May 1961 – 1962	Resident	Ambassador	Also accredited to Abidjan, Accra, Conakry, and Freetown		20 September 1961	
Bo Järnstedt	1962 (Note: The Sveriges statskalender (1964), p. 311, lists the year as 1963. However, Dagens Nyheter reported in March 1962 that Järnstedt had already presented his credentials to President William Tubman in Monrovia. Vem är det ("Who's Who") (1984), p. 571, also states the year as 1962.)–1964	Resident	Ambassador	Also accredited to Accra, Conakry, and Freetown			
Olof Ripa	1964–1968	Resident	Ambassador	Also accredited to Abidjan (from 1967), Accra (until 1967), Conakry, and Freetown			
Hans-Efraim Sköld	1969–1972	Resident	Ambassador	Also accredited to Abidjan, Conakry, and Freetown			
Bengt Friedman	1973–1976	Resident	Ambassador	Also accredited to Abidjan, Bissau (from 1975), Conakry, Freetown, and Praia (Note: Cape Verde became independent on 5 July 1975. Jönsson (2000), p. 360, states that Friedman was accredited in Cape Verde's capital, Praia, the year before, in 1974. Sköldenberg (1976), pp. 434–435, does not mention that he was accredited in Praia.)			
Olof Skoglund	1976–1977	Resident	Ambassador	Also accredited to Abidjan, Bissau, Conakry, Freetown, and Praia			
Rune Fremlin	1977–1980	Resident	Embassy counsellor				
Cai Melin	1978–1982	Non-resident	Ambassador	Resident in Stockholm			
Anders Backman	1980 (Note: Served as first embassy secretary from 1978 but as head of mission only from 1980.)–1981	Resident	First embassy secretary				
Peter Ahlgren	1981–1985	Resident	Chargé d'affaires ad interim (Note: Held the diplomatic rank of first embassy secretary.)				
Erik Cornell	1983–1988	Non-resident	Ambassador	Resident in Stockholm			
Ove Svensson	1985–1989	Resident	Chargé d'affaires ad interim (Note: Held the following diplomatic ranks: first embassy secretary (1985–1987), embassy counsellor (1987–1989).)				
Bengt Holmquist	1988–1992	Non-resident	Ambassador	Resident in Stockholm			
Annie Marie Sundbom	1992–1997	Non-resident	Ambassador	Resident in Stockholm			
Arne Ekfelt	1997–1998	Non-resident	Ambassador	Resident in Stockholm			
Göran Ankarberg	1999–2002	Non-resident	Ambassador	Resident in Abidjan			
Inga Björk-Klevby	2002–2005	Non-resident	Ambassador	Resident in Abidjan			
Agneta Bohman	2006–2010	Non-resident	Ambassador	Resident in Dakar			
Carin Wall	2010–2011	Non-resident	Ambassador	Resident in Stockholm		11 March 2010	
Klas Gierow	2010–2011	Resident	Chargé d'affaires ad interim				
Per Carlson	March 2011 – September 2013	Non-resident	Ambassador	Resident in Stockholm		4 March 2011	
Börje Mattsson	2012–2013	Resident	Chargé d'affaires ad interim				
Sofia Strand	2013–2015	Resident	Ambassador				
Lena Nordström	2015–2017	Resident	Ambassador				
Ingrid Wetterqvist	May 2017 – 14 August 2021	Resident	Ambassador				
Urban Sjöström	15 August 2021 – 2024	Resident	Ambassador	Also accredited to Freetown			
Karl Backéus	2024–present	Resident	Ambassador			25 November 2024	
