= Ingemar Ragnemalm =

Swedish computer programmer

Ingemar Ragnemalm is a Swedish computer programmer. He is best known for writing the Sprite Animation Toolkit, which was used in a number of video games for Mac OS in the 1990s.

== Personal life ==
He has a PhD in image processing and works as software developer and university teacher. He is the nephew of Hans Ragnemalm.
