= Ingemar Dierickx =

Belgian economist (born 1952)

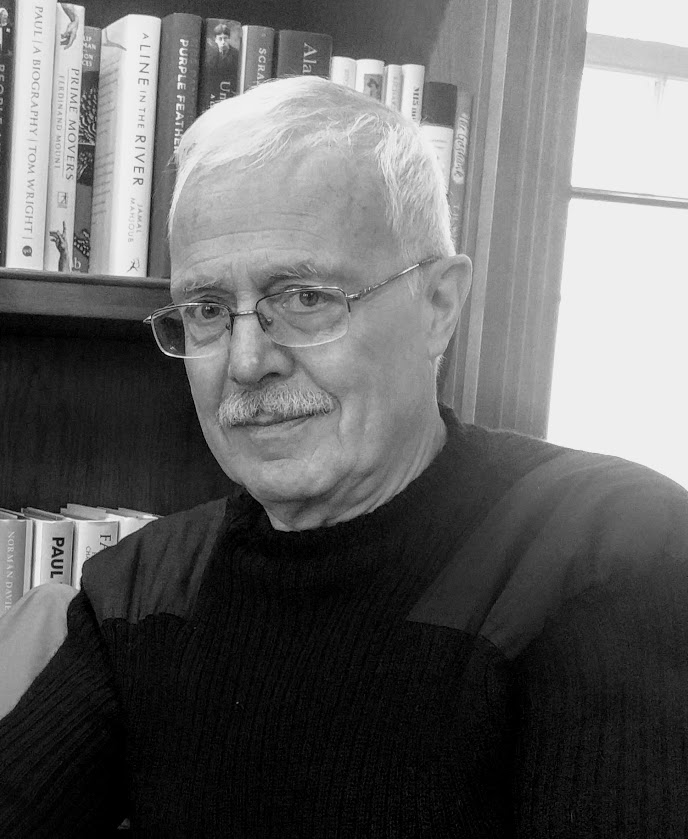
Ingemar Dierickx

Ingemar Dierickx (born 1952) is a Belgian economist and negotiations expert. He is best known for his work on the microeconomic foundations of Strategy and on Negotiation Analysis. In particular, his paper "Asset Stock Accumulation and Sustainability of Competitive Advantage" is a landmark and has been cited over 15,000 times.

Ingemar Dierickx was Professor of Negotiation Analysis at INSEAD, where he created the executive program on Negotiation Dynamics. He was the Director of the program for fifteen years. During his 25 years at INSEAD, his outstanding contributions were recognized with multiple awards, including a special Lifetime Achievement Award for teaching excellence.

== Education ==
Ingemar Dierickx has a PhD in Business Economics and an MBA (Baker Scholar) from Harvard University. He also holds two law degrees, an LL.M. from the Harvard Law School and a Lic. Jur. from Ghent University.

== Selected publications ==
- Fagandini, Paulo and Ingemar Dierickx. 2023. Computing Profit-Maximizing Bid Shading Factors in First-Price Sealed-Bid Auctions. Computational Economics.
- Dierickx, Ingemar, Karel Cool and Luis Almeida Costa. 2014. The Dynamics of Resource Erosion. Palgrave Encyclopedia of Strategic Management.
- Dierickx, Ingemar, Karel Cool and Luis Almeida Costa. 2013. Diseconomies of Time Compression. Palgrave Encyclopedia of Strategic Management.
- Dierickx, Ingemar, Luis Almeida Costa and Karel Cool. 2013. The Competitive Implications of the Deployment of Unique Resources. Strategic Management Journal.
- Dierickx, Ingemar and Luis Almeida Costa. 2005. The Strategic Deployment of Quality-Improving Innovations. Journal of Business.
- Dierickx, Ingemar and Luis Almeida Costa. 2002. Licensing and Bundling. International Journal of Industrial Organization.
- Dierickx, Ingemar, Karel Cool and Gabriel Szulanski. 1997. Diffusion of Innovations within Organizations: Electronic Switching in the Bell System. Organization Science.
- Dierickx, Ingemar, Carmen Matutes and Damien Neven. 1991. Cost Differences and Survival in Declining Industries. A Case for Picking Winners? European Economic Review.
- Dierickx, Ingemar and Mitchell Koza. 1991. Information Asymmetries. How not to 'Buy a Lemon'. European Management Journal.
- Dierickx, Ingemar and Karel Cool. 1989. Asset Stock Accumulation and Sustainability of Competitive Advantage. Management Science.
- Dierickx, Ingemar, Karel Cool and David Jemison. 1989. Business Strategy, Market Structure and Risk-Return Relationships: A Structural Approach. Strategic Management Journal.
- Dierickx, Ingemar, Carmen Matutes and Damien Neven. 1988. Indirect Taxation and Cournot Equilibrium. International Journal of Industrial Organisation.
