= Ingemar Macarine =

Filipino swimmer and lawyer (born 1976)

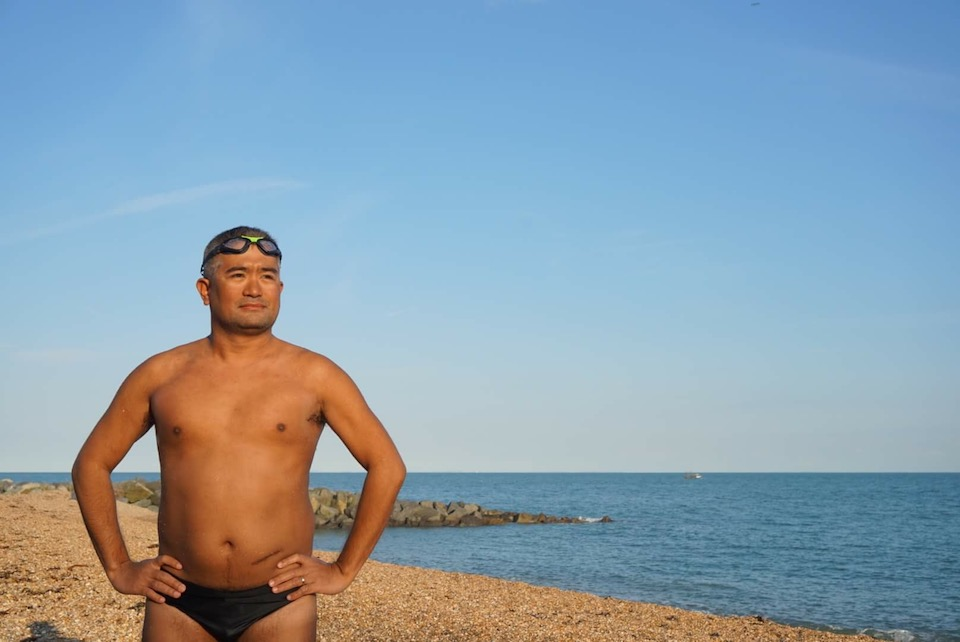
- Born: Ingemar Patiño Macarine; 14 June 1976 (age 49); Placer, Surigao del Norte, Philippines
- Occupations: Environmental Lawyer; Election Officer
- Known for: Marathon swimming

Ingemar Macarine (born June 14, 1976) is a Filipino long-distance swimmer, marathoner and environmental lawyer, currently serving as election officer of Tubigon town in Bohol, a province of the Philippines. Macarine pioneered the open water marathon swimming in the Philippines by crossing several channels in the country.

== Biography ==
A Surigaonon by birth (in Placer, Surigao del Norte on June 14, 1976), environmental lawyer Ingemar Macarine is now based in Tubigon, Bohol. He operates the franchise area of the municipalities of Tubigon and Clarin in Bohol, as owner of South Seas Vision CATV System. He is currently the election lawyer of Tubigon.

== Sporting career ==
=== Long-distance swimming ===
==== In the Philippines ====
Macarine was the first man to swim across the Surigao Strait which is known for its turbulent water currents and at the time of his crossing there were recent sightings of Hammerhead sharks. The feat done in Surigao City on December 30, 2013 was done by Macarine by swimming from Basul Island to Barangay Lipata. In May 2015, Macarine mentioned that he has never encountered a shark in his open water swimming stints.

After the first successful open water swim, Macarine made several crossings in and out of the country to promote his lifetime advocacy on clean seas, climate change awareness and environmental tourism.

One of his scary crossings was in Bantayan Island in Santa Fe town to San Remegio town in Cebu province when one of the escort boats capsized due to big waves.

Another record-setting swim he made was the crossing in Pamilacan Island to mainland Bohol in which Macarine needed to swim using breaststroke to hurdle the big waves encountered during the last three kilometers to avoid drinking seawater.

Though not all his swim attempt became successful, his record-setting swim aimed to compete Visayas to Mindanao by taking the course of 23-kilometer distance from San Recardo, Southern Leyte to Surigao City, the Pinoy Aquaman failed to reach his destination when he was driven off-course by strong currents.

Macarine followed the Marathon Swimming Federation rules, a set of standards and guidelines on undertaking a solo, unassisted open-water marathon swim.

Because of his record-setting accomplishments, Macarine garnered several recognition and prestigious awards, such as being named as one of the Heroes of the Environment in 2015 by the World Wide Fund (WWF) for Nature.

In the same year, the Pinoy Aquaman was among the 12 nominees to be selected for Man of the Year by the World Open Water Swimming Association (WOWSA).

On January 17, 2016 he crossed the Surigao Strait once again, this time from Sumilom Island of Barangay Lipata to Barangay Punta Bilar in Surigao City proper despite encountering thousands of jellyfishes and strong water currents. He is the first person to swim between the two points.

Beyond swimming, Macarine participates in triathlon and running events. He organized several successful running events being an active president of Surigao Runners Club based in Surigao City.

==== Outside the Philippines ====
Macarine has not only conquered warm waters in the tropics but also cold waters abroad. These include the successful swim from Alcatraz Island Penitentiary to San Francisco, California in the United States — the first Filipino to do so.

The Pinoy Aquaman is probably the first Filipino if not Asian to swim across Chesapeake Bay from Bay Bridge Marina to Sandy Point Park Beach in Annapolis, Maryland on June 8, 2015.

In June 2016, Macarine announced that he was ready to swim across the English Channel. If he managed to accomplish the feat he would be the first Filipino endurance swimmer to cross the strait. He planned to swim from England in the United Kingdom to France and board a boat back to England. He underwent acclimation training in the United Kingdom which began on July 11, 2016. Edwin Dela Cruz went with him to the United Kingdom, to serve as his navigator for the English Channel crossing attempt scheduled in August.

The scheduled swim from Dover, United Kingdom to Calais, France originally meant to be done on August 16, 2016 was cancelled due to continuous bad weather. The weather conditions rendered the English Channel unsuitable for long distance swimming for at least a month.

== Organizations ==
- Founding President: Surigao Runners Club (First Running Club in the Caraga Region)
- Member: Triathlon Bohol, Team Solomon Running, and Triathlon Surigao
1. Outstanding Alumni for Sports 2015 given by Surigao Norte National High School.
2. Outstanding Surigaonon for Sports 2014 given by Rotary Club of Surigao City.
3. Outstanding Tubignon for Sports 2016 given by the Municipality of Tubigon, Bohol.
4. Nominated by World Open Water Swimming Association (WOWSA) of Huntington, California as Man of the year 2015 (3rd Placer) for three pioneering marathon swims for the environment in 2015. First and only Southeast Asian to be accorded such honor.
5. Nominated again by World Open Water Swimming Association (WOWSA) of Huntington, California as Man of the Year for 2016.
6. Rank number 21 of the world's 50 most adventurous open water swimmers according to WOWSA
7. Special Citation given by Sportswriters Association of Cebu 2017
8. Recipient of the Bohol Governor's Award 2017 for Environmental Advocacy thru Long Distance Swimming.
