= Hans Ragnemalm =

Swedish lawyer, judge and professor emeritus of public law

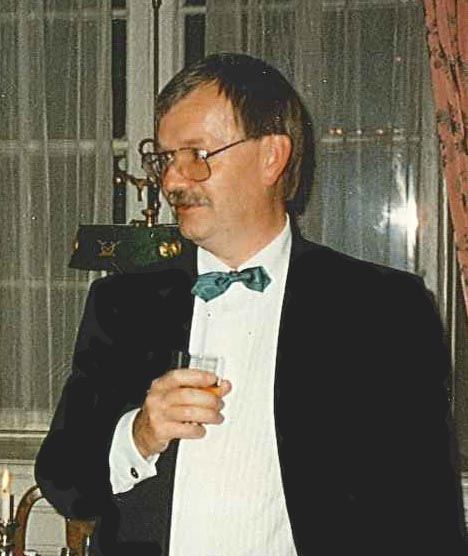
Hans Ragnemalm in 1989.

Hans Olof Ragnemalm (30 March 1940 – 7 August 2016) was a Swedish lawyer, judge, and professor emeritus of public law.

Ragnemalm became professor of public law at Lund University, and later professor of public law and dean of the law faculty at the Stockholm University. He served as Parliamentary Ombudsman between 1987 and 1992, and from 1992 to 1995 as judge at the Supreme Administrative Court of Sweden.

In 1995 Ragnemalm became Sweden's first judge at the European Court of Justice in Luxembourg. In 2000 he returned to Sweden to serve as president of the Supreme Administrative Court of Sweden until his retirement in 2005.

== See also ==
- List of members of the European Court of Justice

Legal offices
Preceded by Gunnar Björne	President of the Supreme Administrative Court of Sweden; 2000–2005	Succeeded by Rune Lavin
