= Yekepa =

Town in Nimba County, Liberia

Yekepa Yakepa
- Location in Liberia
- Coordinates: 7°35′N 8°32′W
- Country: Liberia
- County: Nimba County

Yekepa is a town in the Yahmein or Yarmein District of northern Nimba County in Liberia, lying near the Guinean border. It was the base for Lamco's iron ore mining operation until it was destroyed in the First Liberian Civil War which lasted from 1989 to 1997. Nearby Guesthouse Hill is one of the highest points in the nation. The community is home to the African Bible College University. Despite some controversy, international steel company Arcelor Mittal was given approval to begin restoring the once prosperous mining town in May 2007. The reconstruction was to include a hospital, schools and other facilities for the township. However, due to fluctuations in world iron prices, much of the redevelopment never happened, and less than a decade later, much of the site had been abandoned once again.

== Notable people ==
- Jeremiah Koung (b. 1978), Vice President of Liberia (2024-present)
