= LAMCO =

Liberian mining company

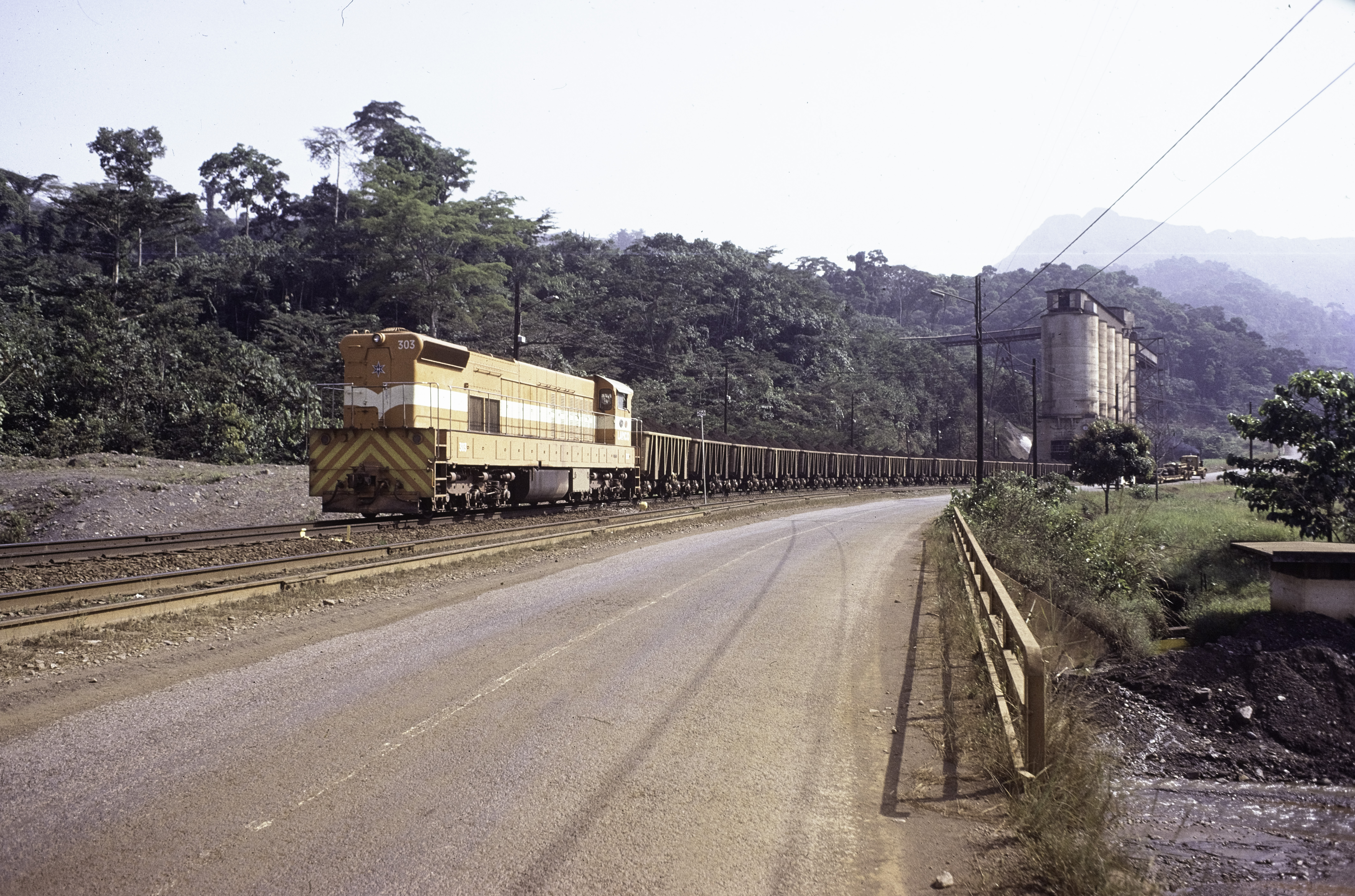
A LAMCO train takes on an iron ore load at Yekepa in 1976

The Liberian-American-Swedish Mining Company (LAMCO) is a defunct Liberian corporation that mined for iron ore in the Nimba range in Liberia and exploited the area during the second half of the twentieth century. Founded in 1955 by American and Swedish investors, the company established the first large-scale mining operation in Liberia following the discovery in the 1950s of the Nimba ore body by geologist Sandy Clarke.

The company built a standard gauge railroad approximately 360 km long, linking the mine in the north of the country, to the Port of Buchanan. The Nimba project was managed by LAMCO, Bethlehem Steel, and the Liberian government. Liberia introduced a nationalization policy intended to gradually phase out the non-Liberian staff. By 1989 ore that was profitable for extraction by market rates in the Nimba range had been exploited, but Guinea had large reserves that had not yet been mined.

In November 1989, LAMCO was taken over by the Liberian Mining Corporation (LIMINCO), formed to maintain the Liberian ports and railways and to facilitate a joint project with Guinea, known as the Nimba International Mining Company (NIMCO), to extract ore on its side of the border, transport it by a railway to be built to Buchanan, Liberia, and export it by ship. Part of the joint project was construction of a railway from Guinea to the port of Buchanan. Operations were to be managed by the London-based African Mining Consortium Limited (AMCL) under a ten-year contract.

Operations were disrupted, but never damaged, several times during the civil war beginning in September 1990 with the invasion of Charles Taylor's forces. For a time private interests continued with the thought of "booty futures", if Taylor 's National Patriotic Front of Liberia (NPFL) won the war. He was believed to be siphoning off monies from the mining operations.

African nations collaborated to form a force to try to intervene and bring peace; it was known as the Economic Community Cease-Fire Monitoring Group (ECOMOG). Its forces captured Buchanan in 1993, and iron ore export operations ceased. Profits had been declining and, as of January 1994, ships were no longer willing to try to pick up ore at the Port of Buchanan because of the state of war.

Soon after operations were halted, LIMINCO's sites at the ports of Yekepa and Buchanan were pillaged by warring forces. Such looting continued until 2004.

ArcelorMittal, a European-Indian steel company formed in 2007 and based in Luxembourg City, announced that it intended to reactivate the former LAMCO mining operation. It soon encountered financial problems due to decline in the steel demand in Europe. Its business began to improve after 2014 with new contracts with China.

== See also ==
- Transport in Liberia
- British Rail Class 08
- British Rail Class 126
- Yekepa
