= Embassy of Sweden, Bamako =

- Location: Bamako
- Address: Immeuble UATT-2eme Etage; Quartier du Fleuve; Bamako, Mali
- Coordinates: 12.63084°N 8.00266°W
- Opened: 2010
- Closed: 31 December 2024
- Jurisdiction: Mali; Burkina Faso; Niger; Mauritania
- Website: Official website

The Embassy of Sweden, Bamako was the diplomatic mission of Sweden in Mali. Sweden's diplomatic engagement with Mali began in 1964, with the first ambassador accredited from the embassy in Abidjan, Ivory Coast. After the Abidjan embassy closed in 1967, responsibility for Mali shifted to the Swedish embassy in Algiers and later to other locations. In 2010, Sweden upgraded its presence in Mali by establishing a full embassy in Bamako, focusing on development cooperation, including human rights, democracy, and sustainable resource management. However, due to deteriorating security and Mali's growing alignment with Russia, Sweden decided to close the embassy by the end of 2024, while maintaining regional support through Dakar, Senegal. The closure followed the expulsion of the Swedish ambassador in August 2024, after a diplomatic dispute over Sweden's decision to phase out aid to Mali. Despite these challenges, Sweden remains committed to supporting Mali through regional initiatives and partnerships.

== History ==
Sweden recognized the Mali Federation as a sovereign and independent state on 20 June 1960, in connection with its declaration of independence, as announced by Acting Foreign Minister Carl Henrik Nordlander in a congratulatory telegram to Mali's Prime Minister, Modibo Keïta. Simultaneously, a congratulatory telegram was sent by His Majesty the King.

In a government bill in March 1963, it was proposed that a Swedish diplomatic mission be established in Abidjan, Ivory Coast, with a jurisdiction that would also cover Mali, as well as Niger, Togo, and Upper Volta. Sweden's first ambassador accredited in Bamako was Karl Henrik Andersson, who held a dual accreditation from the Swedish embassy in Abidjan, starting in 1964. The embassy in Abidjan closed in 1967 and responsibility for Mali was transferred to the Swedish embassy in Algiers. Ambassador Claës König in Algiers presented his letters of credence to President Moussa Traoré on 28 May 1969. Until 1980, the ambassador in Algiers was accredited in Bamako, then for a year from the Swedish embassy in Abidjan, Ivory Coast, before a Stockholm-based ambassador took over the role until the year 2000. In the 2000s, the Swedish ambassador in Dakar, Senegal, was accredited in Bamako.

Sweden upgraded its relations with Mali in 2010 by converting the Swedish International Development Cooperation Agency (Sida) section office in Bamako into an embassy.

Confronted with the deteriorating security situation in Mali, the Swedish government decided to close its embassy in Bamako by the end of 2024. This decision, which also affected the embassy in Ouagadougou, was driven by the need to redefine development aid and the assessment that a permanent diplomatic presence was no longer essential. Despite the closure, Sweden assured Mali that bilateral relations would remain active. Since the embassy opened in 2010, Sweden had invested heavily in Mali's rural development, education, and health sectors, contributing significantly to local infrastructure and essential services. Swedish forces also played a crucial role in peacekeeping operations, including MINUSMA and the Takuba operation. Although the embassy closure might limit resources for development and security projects, Sweden intended to continue its regional support through a new embassy in Dakar, Senegal, while maintaining strong bilateral ties.

In August 2024, the Swedish ambassador to Mali, Kristina Kühnel, was ordered to leave the country within 72 hours due to a "hostile" statement by a Swedish minister. This move underscored Mali's shift away from Western allies towards Russia, following Sweden's decision to phase out aid due to Mali's ties with Moscow. Relations between Mali and Western nations had deteriorated as Mali, ruled by a military junta, increasingly aligned with Russia. Swedish Foreign Minister Tobias Billström described the decision as "remarkable" and stated that the Swedish government was considering its response. The expulsion was reportedly due to a "hostile" statement by Sweden's Minister for International Development Cooperation, Johan Forssell, who had previously announced that Sweden would phase out aid to Mali by 2024. Mali recently severed diplomatic ties with Ukraine, moving closer to Russia. Additionally, concerns over corruption were raised after it was discovered that 7.3 million SEK in Swedish aid funds were improperly accounted for, leading to an ongoing recovery process.

The chancery last day for visitors was 30 September 2024 before it closed on 15 October. The embassy's operations then continued from Stockholm until the embassy was closed on 31 December 2024.

== Staff and tasks ==
=== Staff ===
The embassy in Bamako had 24 employees, of whom 12 were sent from Sweden: five from the Ministry for Foreign Affairs, six from the Swedish International Development Cooperation Agency (Sida), and one from the Folke Bernadotte Academy (FBA), along with 11 locally employed staff. As of September 2023, the embassy staff consisted of, in addition to the ambassador and the ambassador's assistant/communication officer, two sections: The Development Cooperation Section consisted of the Deputy Head of Mission/Head of Development Cooperation, a program assistant, a First Embassy Secretary/Controller, a program officer for natural resources and climate change, a program officer for governance and human security, a program officer for human rights, and a First Embassy Secretary/Specialist in Peace and Security (FBA). The Administrative and Consular Affairs and Migration Section consisted of an administrative head, a Third Embassy Secretary/Consular Affairs, Migration and Administration, an Embassy Counselor/Regional Security Advisor for West Africa, a Second Embassy Secretary/Political Reporter, an administrative assistant, a cashier, a receptionist and migration assistant, a custodian/technician, and a driver.

=== Tasks ===
The Swedish embassy was organized into two sections under the ambassador: the Development Cooperation Section, led by the Head of Development Cooperation, and the Administration, Migration, and Consular Affairs Section, led by the Head of Administration. Development cooperation in Mali was coordinated by a deployed head and managed by five deployed program officers and four locally employed staff. The aid amounted to approximately 400 million Swedish kronor per year. The development cooperation focused on the following areas: human rights, democracy, the rule of law, and gender equality; peaceful and inclusive societies; and environment, climate, and sustainable use of natural resources. Joint programming was carried out within the EU circle (ten member states) and in collaboration with Switzerland and Norway. Three Team Europe initiatives were developed. In addition to the bilateral development cooperation, Sweden provided humanitarian aid to Mali, which amounted to approximately 100 million Swedish kronor in 2022.

Through the Swedish International Development Cooperation Agency (Sida) and the Folke Bernadotte Academy (FBA), Sweden worked closely with local actors to improve the living conditions of the Malian population and support the inclusive peace and reconciliation process. The mission of the Folke Bernadotte Academy (FBA) in Sweden's bilateral strategy for development cooperation with Mali for 2021-2025 included contributing to strengthened respect for human rights, democracy, and the rule of law, including security sector reform, as well as enhancing the conditions for equal participation in peace processes and strengthening the capacity to prevent, manage, and resolve conflicts at various levels of society in Mali.

== Buildings ==
Until the Swedish embassy was opened in 2010, the Swedish International Development Cooperation Agency (Sida) had a sectional office in Bamako at the following address: Section de la Coopération Internationale au Développement, Immeuble "Babemba", B.P.E 2093, Bamako. After the embassy was opened, it was located on the second floor of the UATT Building in the Quartier du Fleuve area of Bamako, in the same building as the Delegation of the European Union to Mali.
