= List of ambassadors of Sweden to Mauritania =

Ambassador of Sweden to Mauritania
- Lesser coat of arms of the Kingdom of Sweden
- Incumbent; Catharina Cappelin since 2025
- Ministry for Foreign Affairs
- Style: His or Her Excellency (formal); Mr. or Madam Ambassador (informal)
- Reports to: Minister for Foreign Affairs
- Seat: Dakar, Senegal (Note: The Swedish ambassador to Mauritania is resident in Dakar, Senegal.)
- Appointer: Government of Sweden
- Term length: No fixed term
- Inaugural holder: Lars von Celsing
- Formation: 1970

The Ambassador of Sweden to Mauritania (known formally as the Ambassador of the Kingdom of Sweden to the Islamic Republic of Mauritania) is the official representative of the government of Sweden to the president of Mauritania and government of Mauritania. The ambassador is resident in Dakar, Senegal.

== History ==
Sweden and Mauritania established diplomatic relations on 14 December 1970. Until 1983, the Swedish ambassador accredited to Nouakchott, the capital of Mauritania, was resident in Rabat, Morocco. Thereafter, an ambassador-at-large, who also served as ambassador to several countries in West Africa, took over the role. In 2004, Sweden's ambassador in Dakar, Senegal, became additionally accredited to Nouakchott.

In 2010, the embassy in Dakar closed and a new embassy opened in Bamako, the capital of Mali. The ambassador there became additionally accredited to Nouakchott. The embassy in Bamako closed in 2024, and the following year the embassy in Dakar reopened. Since then, Sweden's ambassador in Dakar has been additionally accredited to Nouakchott.

== List of representatives ==
Name	Period	Title	Resident / Concurrent accreditation	Notes	Presented credentials	Ref
Lars von Celsing	1970–1972	Ambassador	Resident in Rabat			
Åke Sjölin	1972–1976	Ambassador	Resident in Rabat			
Knut Bernström	1977–1983	Ambassador	Resident in Rabat			
Erik Cornell	1983–1988	Ambassador	Resident in Stockholm			
Bengt Holmquist	1989–1992	Ambassador	Resident in Stockholm			
Magnus Faxén	1993–1995	Ambassador	Resident in Stockholm			
Cecilia Malmsten	1996–2000	Ambassador	Resident in Rabat			
Peter Bruce	2001–2004	Ambassador	Resident in Rabat			
Annika Magnusson	2004–2005	Ambassador	Resident in Dakar			
Agneta Bohman	2006–2010	Ambassador	Resident in Dakar			
Carin Wall	2010–2013	Ambassador	Resident in Bamako		4 February 2013	
Eva Emnéus	2013–2018	Ambassador	Resident in Bamako		1 September 2015	
Diana Janse	2019–2021	Ambassador	Resident in Bamako			
Kristina Kühnel	2022–2024	Ambassador	Resident in Bamako		26 July 2022	
Catharina Cappelin	2025–present	Ambassador	Resident in Dakar		20 October 2026	
