= Lennart Petri =

Swedish diplomat (1891–1972)

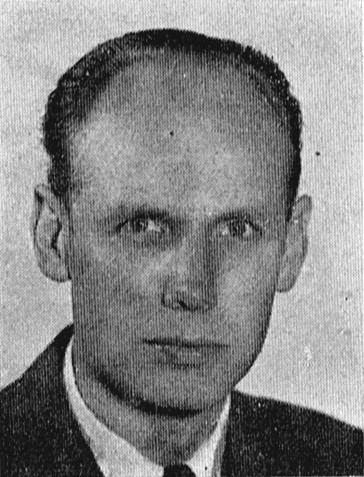
- Born: Carl Johan Lennart Petri; 10 May 1914; Riseberga, Sweden
- Died: 25 June 1996 (aged 82); Everöd, Sweden
- Education: Lund University
- Occupation: Diplomat
- Years active: 1938–1980
- Spouse: Carin Buchberger (m. 1949)
- Children: 3

Carl Johan Lennart Petri (10 May 1914 – 25 June 1996) was a Swedish diplomat. Petri began his diplomatic career in 1938 and served in various international postings, including Madrid, Washington, Buenos Aires, and Bogotá, with a focus on supporting Swedish exports. After returning to Stockholm, he worked on major credit agreements with the Soviet Union and later served in key roles in Paris and Moscow, where he challenged pro-Soviet leanings within the Swedish delegation. He was appointed ambassador to Rabat, Tunis, and Tripoli in the late 1950s and later served as ambassador to Beijing and Phnom Penh during the turbulent Vietnam War years. Petri criticized Sweden’s Vietnam policy as naïve and driven by poor judgment, attributing its failures to Foreign Minister Torsten Nilsson and his inner circle. Known for his independence and bluntness, Petri often clashed with political leadership over foreign policy direction. He concluded his diplomatic career with postings in Vienna and Madrid, where he again resisted prevailing political assumptions—this time regarding Spain’s transition to democracy. After retiring in 1980, he served as a foreign policy advisor and published his memoirs in 1996, offering reflections on decades of global political change.

== Early life ==
Petri was born on 10 May 1914 in Riseberga Parish, Kristianstad County, Sweden, the son of Captain G E Göransson and his wife Lajla (née Petri). He completed his secondary school exams in Kristianstad in 1932, earned a Bachelor of Arts from Lund University in 1934, and received a Candidate of Law degree in 1938.

== Career ==
Petri joined the Ministry for Foreign Affairs as an attaché in 1938. He served in Madrid in 1939, then in New York City and Washington in 1941, and in Buenos Aires in 1942. In 1943, he was appointed acting second secretary at the legation in Lima, a role he officially assumed in 1944. He later served as chargé d'affaires ad interim in Bogotá. As a young diplomat in South America, Petri devoted significant effort to supporting Swedish companies, particularly in promoting exports. Much of this work focused on assisting LM Ericsson. Upon returning to Stockholm, he became second secretary at the Foreign Ministry in 1946 and secretary to the Committee on Foreign Affairs the same year. He was appointed first secretary in 1949, having already served in an acting capacity since 1946 and as an extraordinary secretary from 1947. In Stockholm, he worked on major credit agreements that Sweden offered to the Soviet Union.

In 1949, Petri was posted as first secretary to the embassy in Paris, becoming counsellor there in 1954. In 1955, he was reassigned to Moscow, also covering Bucharest, Kabul, and Sofia. During his time in Moscow, Petri made considerable efforts to persuade his superior, Rolf Sohlman—known for his Soviet sympathies—that he was representing Sweden and the Swedish government's positions, not a foreign ideology. In 1958, Petri was appointed envoy to Rabat and Tunis, becoming ambassador to Rabat in 1959, and concurrently to Tunis and Tripoli from 1960 to 1962.

From 1963 to 1969, he served as ambassador in Beijing, also accredited to Phnom Penh, from 1965 to 1969. Petri repeatedly urged the Swedish government to consider playing a peacekeeping role in the Vietnam War through dialogue. He later realized that the government—especially Foreign Minister Torsten Nilsson—was deeply engaged in the issue. Nilsson was heavily influenced by an unofficial group led by his secretary, Jean-Christophe Öberg, despite concerns from senior officials about Öberg’s poor judgment. Petri concluded that Nilsson bore primary responsibility for Sweden’s repeated missteps in its Vietnam policy. He was puzzled that a normally wise minister would place so much trust in someone as impulsive and inexperienced as Öberg. When Petri raised his concerns, Nilsson and Prime Minister Olof Palme dismissed them as an overestimation of the influence of a small nation’s neutrality.

As a civil servant, Petri was known for speaking his mind, which often brought him into conflict with the leadership—especially over Sweden’s emotionally driven approach to the Vietnam War. He believed it reflected a lack of understanding of the region’s history and power dynamics, and that Sweden missed a genuine opportunity to contribute to peace through constructive mediation. He served as ambassador in Vienna from 1969 to 1976, and then in Madrid from 1976 to 1980. His reluctance to heed signals from above became particularly apparent during his final posting in Madrid. Olof Palme, Torsten Nilsson, and senior Foreign Ministry officials found it difficult to accept that a democratization process in Spain could be led by a monarch. Petri’s efforts to clarify what he believed to be the reality eventually had an effect—though only after considerable delay. In this case, as in others, foreign policy had become a matter of domestic politics.

Petri retired from the diplomatic service in 1980 and subsequently served as foreign policy advisor to Atlas Copco AB from 1980 to 1994. He kept diaries throughout his entire professional life, which were later deposited in the University Library in Lund. The same year he died, his memoir Sweden in the Big World: Memories and Reflections from 40 Years of Diplomatic Service (1996) was published. It includes insights into post–civil war Spain, the Soviet Union after Stalin’s death, and China during the Cultural Revolution.

== Personal life ==
In 1949, Petri married Carin Buchberger (1923–2014), the daughter of envoy Carl Buchberger and Marianne (née Bexelius). They had three children: a son, Carl Göran (born 1950), and twin daughters, Elisabeth (born 1951) and Marianne "Anne" (1951–1980).

== Death ==
Petri died on 25 June 1996 in Everöd Parish in Everöd, Kristianstad Municipality, Sweden. He was interred on 29 October 1996 at Everöd Old Cemetery.

== Awards and decorations ==
- (Sweden) Commander of the Order of the Polar Star (11 November 1966)
- (Sweden) Knight of the Order of the Polar Star (1958)
- (Spain) Commander of the Order of Civil Merit
- (France) Officer of the Legion of Honour
- Officer of the Order of the Sun of Peru
- (Belgium) Knight of the Order of Leopold II
- (Denmark) Knight of the Order of the Dannebrog
- (Spain) Knight of the Order of Isabella the Catholic

== Honours ==
- Honorary Doctor of Philosophy, Lund University (1988)

== Bibliography ==
- Petri, Lennart (1996). Sverige i stora världen: minnen och reflexioner från 40 års diplomattjänst [Sweden in the big world: memories and reflections from 40 years of diplomatic service] (in Swedish). Stockholm: Atlantis. ISBN 9174863398. SELIBR 7644490.

Diplomatic posts
Preceded by None	Envoy/Ambassador of Sweden to Morocco; 1958–1962	Succeeded by Bo Siegbahn
Preceded by None	Envoy/Ambassador of Sweden to Tunisia; 1958–1962	Succeeded by Per Bertil Kollberg
Preceded by None	Ambassador of Sweden to Libya; 1960–1962	Succeeded by Per Bertil Kollberg
Preceded by Kjell Öberg	Ambassador of Sweden to China; 1963–1969	Succeeded by Arne Björnberg
Preceded by Tord Hagen	Ambassador of Sweden to Cambodia; 1965–1969	Succeeded by Arne Björnberg
Preceded by Karl-Gustav Lagerfelt	Ambassador of Sweden to Austria; 1969–1976	Succeeded by Claës Ivar Wollin
Preceded by Knut Bernström	Ambassador of Sweden to Spain; 1976–1980	Succeeded by Carl-George Crafoord
