= Treaty between Tunis and Sweden =

Peace and trade treaty between Tunis and Sweden

- Type: Peace & Trade
- Signed: 23 December 1736

The Treaty between Tunis and Sweden was a treaty signed between Sweden and Tunisia in 1736 regarding peace between them and trade in the Mediterranean Sea. The treaty was signed by George Logie, the Swedish consul in Algiers, after his previous successful negotiation between Sweden and Algiers.

== Stipulations ==
While the exact stipulations are not known, they are known to have closely followed those of the previous Swedish treaty with Algiers in 1729.

- When Swedish warships arrive, the Swedish Consul or the commander of the ships must warn the Governor of Tunis to secure the slaves, this was also to be announced publicly so everyone kept an eye on their slaves.
- If a slave manage to escape and board a Swedish warship, they are to be considered free.
- If a slave escapes onto a merchant ship, they must be returned or a price equivalent to what is paid for slaves in the Bashaw's (ruler of Tunis) house should be paid for them.
- If escaped slaves belong to the Bashaw, a specific amount of 300 Tuniscan dollars must be paid for each slave, and no more.
- Swedish warships must be saluted with 25 cannon shots with their arrival to the fortress Goletta.
