= Katedralskolan =

Katedralskolan (Swedish; "the Cathedral School") is the name, or part of the name, of several Swedish language schools in Sweden and Finland, each of which traces its origin to a medieval cathedral school or a 17th-century gymnasium near a cathedral:

- Katedralskolan, Linköping, Sweden
- Katedralskolan, Lund, Sweden
- Katedralskolan, Skara, Sweden
- Katedralskolan, Uppsala, Sweden
- Katedralskolan, Växjö, Sweden
- Katedralskolan, Åbo, Finland
