= List of ambassadors of Sweden to Algeria =

Ambassador of Sweden to Algeria
- Lesser coat of arms of the Kingdom of Sweden
- Incumbent; Anna Block Mazoyer since 2025
- Ministry for Foreign Affairs; Swedish Embassy, Algiers
- Style: His or Her Excellency (formal); Mr. or Madam Ambassador (informal)
- Reports to: Minister for Foreign Affairs
- Residence: Rue Olof Palme, Hydra
- Seat: Algiers, Algeria
- Appointer: Government of Sweden
- Term length: No fixed term
- Inaugural holder: Anders Forsse
- Formation: 1963
- Website: Swedish Embassy, Algiers

The Ambassador of Sweden to Algeria (known formally as the Ambassador of the Kingdom of Sweden to the People's Democratic Republic of Algeria) is the official representative of the government of Sweden to the president of Algeria and government of Algeria.

== History ==
On the occasion of the proclamation of Algeria's independence on 3 July 1962, Sweden's Minister for Foreign Affairs, Östen Undén, stated in a telegram to the chairman of the provisional Algerian executive government, Abderrahmane Farès, that the Swedish government recognized Algeria as a sovereign and independent state. The Swedish embassy in Algiers opened in 1963 after Algeria's independence the year before.

In April 1963, an agreement was reached between Sweden and Algeria to establish diplomatic relations at ambassadorial level between the two countries. Bengt Rabaeus, the embassy counselor at the Swedish Embassy in Paris, was appointed as Sweden's first ambassador to Algiers. In July of the same year, Ambassador Rabaeus presented his credentials to Prime Minister Ahmed Ben Bella.

During the 1960s and 1970s, the ambassador held a dual accreditation to Bamako, Mali.

== List of representatives ==
Name	Period	Title	Resident / Concurrent accreditation	Notes	Presented credentials	Ref
Anders Forsse	1962–1963	Chargé d'affaires ad interim		Also consul		
Bengt Rabaeus	1963–1966	Ambassador			July 1963	
Wilhelm Wachtmeister	1966–1967	Ambassador				
Claës König	1968–1972	Ambassador	Also acreddited to Bamako			
Jean-Jacques von Dardel	1972–1974	Ambassador	Also acreddited to Bamako			
Harald Edelstam	1974–1979	Ambassador	Also acreddited to Bamako (from 1975)			
Stig Brattström	1979–1982	Ambassador	Also acreddited to Bamako (until 1980)			
Jean-Christophe Öberg	1982–1987	Ambassador				
Tom Tscherning	1987–1992	Ambassador				
Göran Wide	1993–1998	Ambassador		Temporarily moved to Paris due to the war. (Note: In September 1994, Göran Wide temporarily moved to Paris due to the Algerian Civil War.)		
Krister Göranson	1998–2000	Ambassador				
Andreas Ådahl	2000–2003	Ambassador				
Per Saland	2003–2004	Ambassador				
Helena Nilsson Lannegren	2005–2008	Ambassador		Political appointee (non-career diplomat)		
Eva Emnéus	2008–2013	Ambassador				
Carin Wall	2013–2016	Ambassador				
Marie-Claire Swärd Capra	1 September 2016 – 2021	Ambassador				
Björn Häggmark	2021–2025	Ambassador				
Anna Block Mazoyer	2025–present	Ambassador			28 October 2025	

== See also ==
- Embassy of Sweden, Algiers
