= Rabaeus =

Rabaeus is a surname. Notable people with the surname include:

- Bengt Rabaeus, Swedish diplomat
- Johan Rabaeus, Swedish actor
