= List of ambassadors of Sweden to Mali =

Ambassador of Sweden to Mali
- Lesser coat of arms of the Kingdom of Sweden
- Ministry for Foreign Affairs; Swedish Embassy, Bamako
- Style: His or Her Excellency (formal); Mr. or Madam Ambassador (informal)
- Reports to: Minister for Foreign Affairs
- Seat: Bamako, Mali
- Appointer: Government of Sweden
- Term length: No fixed term
- Inaugural holder: Karl Henrik Andersson
- Formation: 1964
- Abolished: August 2024
- Website: Swedish Embassy, Bamako

The Ambassador of Sweden to Mali (known formally as the Ambassador of the Kingdom of Sweden to the Republic of Mali) is the official representative of the government of Sweden to the head of state of Mali and government of Mali.

== History ==
Sweden recognized the Mali Federation as a sovereign and independent state on 20 June 1960, in connection with its declaration of independence, as announced by Acting Foreign Minister Carl Henrik Nordlander in a congratulatory telegram to Mali's Prime Minister, Modibo Keïta. Simultaneously, a congratulatory telegram was sent by His Majesty the King.

Sweden's first ambassador accredited in Bamako was Karl Henrik Andersson, who held a dual accreditation from the Swedish embassy in Abidjan, Ivory Coast, starting in 1964. The embassy in Abidjan closed in 1967 and responsibility for Mali was transferred to the Swedish embassy in Algiers. Ambassador Claës König in Algiers presented his letters of credence to President Moussa Traoré on 28 May 1969. Until 1980, the ambassador in Algiers was accredited in Bamako, then for a year from the Swedish embassy in Abidjan, before a Stockholm-based ambassador took over the role until the year 2000. In the 2000s, the Swedish ambassador in Dakar, Senegal, was accredited in Bamako.

Sweden opened an embassy in Bamako in 2010 and appointed a resident ambassador there. The ambassador was accredited in neighboring countries.

In August 2024, the Swedish ambassador to Mali, Kristina Kühnel, was ordered to leave the country within 72 hours due to a "hostile" statement by a Swedish minister. This move underscored Mali's shift away from Western allies towards Russia, following Sweden's decision to phase out aid due to Mali's ties with Moscow. Relations between Mali and Western nations had deteriorated as Mali, ruled by a military junta, increasingly aligned with Russia.

== List of representatives ==
Name	Period	Resident / Non-resident	Title	Resident / Concurrent accreditation	Notes	Presented credentials	Ref
Karl Henrik Andersson	1964–1967	Non-resident	Ambassador	Resident in Abidjan			
Claës König	1968–1972	Non-resident	Ambassador	Resident in Algiers		28 May 1969	
Jean-Jacques von Dardel	1972–1974	Non-resident	Ambassador	Resident in Algiers			
Harald Edelstam	1975–1979	Non-resident	Ambassador	Resident in Algiers			
Stig Brattström	1979–1980	Non-resident	Ambassador	Resident in Algiers			
Hans-Olle Olsson	1980–1981	Non-resident	Ambassador	Resident in Abidjan			
–	1982–1982	Non-resident	Ambassador		Vacant		
Erik Cornell	1983–1988	Non-resident	Ambassador	Resident in Stockholm			
Bengt Holmquist	1989–1992	Non-resident	Ambassador	Resident in Stockholm			
–	1993–1994	Non-resident	Ambassador	Resident in Stockholm	Vacant		
Magnus Faxén	1994–1995	Non-resident	Ambassador	Resident in Stockholm			
Nils-Erik Schyberg	1996–1998	Non-resident	Ambassador	Resident in Stockholm			
–	1999–2000	Non-resident	Ambassador	Resident in Stockholm	Vacant		
Bo Wilén	2000–2002	Non-resident	Ambassador	Resident in Dakar			
Annika Magnusson	2002–2005	Non-resident	Ambassador	Resident in Dakar			
Agneta Bohman	2006–2010	Non-resident	Ambassador	Resident in Dakar			
Carin Wall	2010–2013	Resident	Ambassador			12 November 2010	
Eva Emnéus	2013–2018	Resident	Ambassador	Also accredited to Niamey (from 2015), Nouakchott (from 2015), and Ouagadougou (from 2015)			
Jessica Svärdström	1 September 2018 – 2019	Resident	Ambassador	Also accredited to Ouagadougou		18 September 2018	
Diana Janse	2019–2021	Resident	Ambassador	Also accredited to Niamey, Ouagadougou, and Nouakchott.			
Kristina Kühnel	2021 – August 2024	Resident (Note: Resident until August 2024 when the ambassador was ordered to leave the country.)	Ambassador	Also accredited to Niamey (from 2023)			

== See also ==
- Embassy of Sweden, Bamako
