= Arne Thorén =

Swedish journalist and diplomat (1927–2003)

- Born: Björn Arne Jerker Thorén; 24 March 1927; Gothenburg, Sweden
- Died: 23 February 2003 (aged 75); Össjö, Sweden
- Education: Gothenburg University College; University of South Dakota
- Occupations: Journalist, diplomat
- Years active: 1919–1961
- Spouse(s): Elise Wickes Merrit (m. 1951; div. 1963) Margareta Bahrton (m. 1964–1966) Eva Berch (m. 1966)
- Children: 4

Björn Arne Jerker Thorén (24 March 1927 – 23 February 2003) was a Swedish journalist and diplomat. As correspondent in the United States he submitted between 7,000 and 8,000 reports for Sveriges Radio and informed the Swedish people of the assassination of John F. Kennedy, of the first man on the moon and of the Watergate scandal. In the 1980s and 1990s, Thorén served as Consul General of Sweden in Chicago and New York City and as Ambassador of Sweden in Iraq.

== Early life ==
Thorén was born on 24 March 1927 in Carl Johan Parish in Gothenburg, Sweden, the son of editor-in-chief Jerker Thorén (1895–1977) and his wife Helen Setterberg (1902–1991). He was the older brother of the journalist and TV host Ulf Thorén (1929–1978) and Görel Thorén-Mellby (1932–2012).

== Career ==
Thorén attended Gothenburg University College from 1946 to 1947 and the University of South Dakota from 1948 to 1949. Thorén worked for Göteborgs Handels- och Sjöfartstidning and Expressen in 1950 and he was Expressen's New York City correspondent from 1952 to 1964. He was part of Sveriges Radio's newsroom from 1956 to 1964 and was Sveriges Radio's chief correspondent in New York City from 1964 to 1977. It was Thorén who, with his characteristic voice, told the Swedish people of the assassination of John F. Kennedy, of the first man on the moon, of the Watergate scandal and other events. For the radio alone, he submitted between 7,000 and 8,000 reports. After 28 years in the US, Thorén returned to Sweden and to his childhood city Gothenburg.

Thorén was managing editor at Göteborgs-Posten from 1977 to 1980. Thorén's diplomatic career began in 1980 when he was appointed Consul General of Sweden in Chicago. He then served as Ambassador of Sweden in Baghdad, Iraq from 1983 to 1988. Thorén served in Baghdad during the Iran–Iraq War and was an important reporter home to Sweden and Olof Palme, who was the special mediator of the United Nations in the Iran–Iraq War. After Iraq, Thorén served as Consul General of Sweden in New York City from 1988 to 1992.

Thorén was deputy chairman of the Foreign Press Association in New York City in 1962 and a member of the executive committee of the United Nations Correspondents Association from 1959 to 1964. He was chairman of the United Nations Correspondents Association in 1975 and of the Dag Hammarskjöld Memorial Fund from 1972 to 1977 and of Örgryte IS from 1978 to 1980.

== Later life ==
Thorén moved to Össjö in Skåne County together with his wife Eva. Thorén was a short-term party leader for the Pensioners' Party (Pensionärspartiet) that he took the initiative to start. One issue he ran as a party leader was discrimination against older people in society and working life. He was also a sought-after speaker.

== Personal life ==
Thorén first married in 1951 to Elise Wickes Merrit (1924–2004), at the time employed at the United States Embassy in Stockholm, daughter of Mrs. Helen Peterson Merrit, Washington, D.C. They had the children Stephen Arne Thorén (born 1951), diplomat Michele Thorén Bond (born 1953) and Peter L. Thorén (born 1956). They divorced in 1963. The wife remarried to Thomas A. Callaghan.

He was then married 1964–1966 to Margareta Bahrton (born 1937), the daughter of Tage Bahrton and Ebba Ekvall. They had one daughter, Cecilia Usher (born 1965).

In 1966, he married Eva Berch (born 1931), the daughter of Otto Berch and Saga (née Lennartson).

== Death ==
Thorén died on 23 February 2003 in his home in Össjö Parish in Össjö, Skåne County. He was interred on 15 March 2003 at Össjö Cemetery.

== Awards and honours ==
- Stora Journalistpriset (1969)
- Honorary Doctor of Philosophy, North Park College, Chicago (1983)
- Honorary Doctor of Philosophy, Augustana College, Rock Island, Illinois (1983)

== Bibliography ==
- Thorén, Arne; Thorén, Ulf; Tecknar-Anders (1969). Från min sida sett. Bonniers folkbibliotek, 99-0133706-2 (in Swedish). Stockholm: Bonnier. SELIBR 1712543.
- Thorén, Arne, ed. (1969). De första stegen på månen: ett komplett minnesalbum från den första månlandningen. Stockholm: Studio Cicero. SELIBR 2310372.

Diplomatic posts
Preceded by Tore Högstedt	Consul General of Sweden to Chicago; 1980–1983	Succeeded by Lars Arnö
Preceded by Lars-Olof Brilioth	Ambassador of Sweden to Iraq; 1983–1988	Succeeded by Henrik Amnéus
Preceded by Magnus Faxén	Consul General of Sweden to New York City; 1988–1992	Succeeded by Dag Sebastian Ahlander
