= List of ambassadors of Sweden to Andorra =

Ambassador of Sweden to Andorra
- Lesser coat of arms of the Kingdom of Sweden

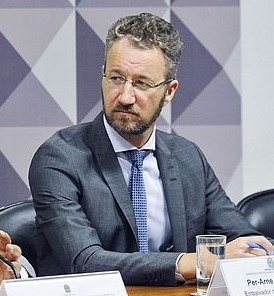
- Incumbent; Per-Arne Hjelmborn since 2024
- Ministry for Foreign Affairs; Swedish Embassy, Madrid
- Style: His or Her Excellency (formal); Mr. or Madam Ambassador (informal)
- Reports to: Minister for Foreign Affairs
- Seat: Madrid, Spain (Note: Swedish ambassador to Andorra la Vella, Andorra is based in Madrid, Spain.)
- Appointer: Government of Sweden
- Term length: No fixed term
- Inaugural holder: Tomas Bertelman
- Formation: 1995

The Ambassador of Sweden to Andorra (known formally as the Ambassador of the Kingdom of Sweden to the Principality of Andorra) is the official representative of the government of Sweden to the co-princes of Andorra and government of Andorra. The Swedish ambassador in Madrid, Spain, is also accredited to Andorra.

== History ==
The Swedish government decided on 2 March 1995 to enter into an agreement establishing diplomatic relations with Andorra through an exchange of notes. The agreement was signed by Andorra's foreign minister Manuel Mas Ribó in Andorra la Vella on 27 January 1995 and by Sweden's foreign minister Lena Hjelm-Wallén in Stockholm on 2 March 1995. The agreement entered into force on 2 March 1995.. The same year, Sweden's ambassador in Madrid, Spain, was also accredited to Andorra's capital, Andorra la Vella.

== List of representatives ==
Name	Period	Title	Resident / Concurrent accreditation	Notes	Presented credentials	Ref
Tomas Bertelman	1995–2000	Ambassador	Resident in Madrid			
Lars Grundberg	2000–2005	Ambassador	Resident in Madrid			
Anders Rönquist	2005–2010	Ambassador	Resident in Madrid			
Cecilia Julin	2011–2016	Ambassador	Resident in Madrid			
Lars-Hjalmar Wide	September 2016 – 2019	Ambassador	Resident in Madrid			
Teppo Tauriainen	1 September 2019 – 2024	Ambassador	Resident in Madrid			
Per-Arne Hjelmborn	2024–present	Ambassador	Resident in Madrid		16 May 2025 (Note: Hjelmborn presented his credentials to Foreign Minister Imma Tor Faus in March 2025, and to the episcopal Co-Prince of Andorra, Joan Enric Vives i Sicília, on 16 May 2025.)	
