= Erik Cornell =

Swedish diplomat (1930–2024)

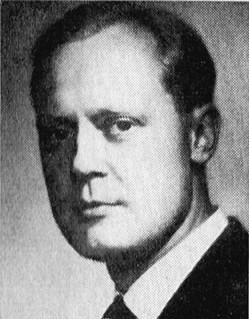
- Born: Carl Johan Erik Cornell; 2 October 1930; Stockholm, Sweden
- Died: 6 November 2024 (aged 94); Knivsta, Sweden
- Education: Nya elementar Stockholm University College
- Occupation: Diplomat
- Years active: 1958–1996
- Spouse(s): Ingrid Söderberg (m. 1959; div. 1972) Gudrun Ahlberg (m. 1974)
- Children: 2, including Svante Cornell

Carl Johan Erik Cornell (2 October 1930 – 6 November 2024), was a Swedish diplomat. Cornell began his career as an attaché at the Ministry for Foreign Affairs in 1958. He held various international postings, including Bonn, Geneva, Warsaw, Addis Ababa, and Rome, before becoming Sweden's chargé d'affaires in Pyongyang in 1975, making him the first Western diplomat stationed in North Korea. His later career included ambassadorships in West Africa and Turkey, as well as a role coordinating African trade and development. After retiring, he was active in the Swedish Order of Freemasons and wrote several historical and philosophical books.

== Early life ==
Cornell was born on 2 October 1930, in Stockholm, Sweden, the son of Professor Henrik Cornell and his wife, Anna-Stina Julin. He passed studentexamen at Nya Elementar in May 1950.

He completed his reserve officer training in 1953, became a lieutenant in the Svea Life Guards reserve in 1957, and was promoted to captain in the same reserve in 1969. In 1984, he studied at the Swedish National Defence College.

Cornell earned a Bachelor of Arts degree in 1956 and a Master of Political Science from Stockholm University College in 1959.

== Career ==
Cornell became an attaché at the Swedish Ministry for Foreign Affairs in 1958. He was the only applicant that year to be accepted. In December of the same year, when the Nobel Prize was awarded, he served as an adjutant alongside attachés Bo Kjellén and Arnold Wilén for the Soviet Nobel laureates in physics: Pavel Cherenkov, Ilya Frank, and Igor Tamm.

His diplomatic career took him to Bonn in 1959, Geneva in 1960, and Warsaw in 1964. He was appointed secretary in 1962, first secretary in 1963, and desk officer (departementssekreterare) at the Ministry for Foreign Affairs in 1966. His postings continued in Addis Ababa in 1968, and in 1971 he became Sweden's permanent representative to the Food and Agriculture Organization (FAO) in Rome.

In 1975, Cornell was appointed chargé d'affaires and head of Sweden's newly established embassy in Pyongyang, the capital of North Korea. He became the first diplomat from a Western country to be stationed there. One of his key challenges was handling North Korea's substantial debt to Sweden for Volvo cars and industrial equipment purchased from Swedish companies—a situation that quickly turned the pioneering diplomatic mission into a de facto debt collection agency.

Cornell went on to serve as minister in Geneva in 1977 and as ambassador-at-large to multiple West African nations—Bamako, Banjul, Conakry, Dakar, Freetown, Monrovia, Niamey, and Nouakchott—while based in Stockholm in 1983. In 1988, he became coordinator for African trade and development at the Ministry for Foreign Affairs. He was appointed ambassador to Ankara from 1989 to 1995 and later served in Sarajevo in 1996.

After retiring, Cornell dedicated himself not only to the Swedish Order of Freemasons, where he was responsible for international affairs for nearly a decade, but also to writing. He authored several historical and philosophical books, published in the 2000s. In 2002, he was elected a member of the Idun Society.

== Awards and decorations ==
- Knight 1st Class of the Order of the White Rose of Finland (October 1968)
- (Sweden) Stockholm County Defence Committee's Silver Medal

== Personal life ==
Cornell was married from 1959 to 1972 to Ingrid Söderberg (1935–2014). She was the daughter of licensed physician Edward Söderberg and Helga (née Lindskog). Together, they had a son, Fredrik (born 1966).

In 1974, he married Gudrun Ahlberg (born 1936), the daughter of Chief Surveyor Erik Ahlberg and Irma (née Bodén). They had a son, Svante Cornell.

== Death ==
Cornell moved to the dementia care home Estrids Gård in Knivsta on 31 August 2023, where he died on 6 November 2024, at the age of 94. His funeral service was held on 3 December 2024, at Gustaf Adolf Church in Stockholm.

== Bibliography ==
- Cornell, Erik (2005). Från härskarmakt till rättsstat: vägen till politisk pluralism [From authoritarianism to the rule of law: the path to political pluralism] (in Swedish). Lund: Studentlitteratur. ISBN 9144043481. SELIBR 9997629.
- Cornell, Erik (2004). Revolutionärernas förräderi: Afrika efter kalla kriget [The Betrayal of Revolutionaries: Africa After the Cold War] (in Swedish). Lund: Studentlitteratur. ISBN 9144031408. SELIBR 9222548.
- Cornell, Erik (2002). North Korea under communism: report of an envoy to paradise. London: Routledge Curzon. ISBN 0700716971. SELIBR 8688611.
- Cornell, Erik (2001). Turkey in the 21st century: opportunities, challenges, threats. Richmond: Curzon. ISBN 0700711716. SELIBR 5460337.
- Cornell, Erik (1999). Nordkorea: sändebud till paradiset [North Korea: Envoy to Paradise] (in Swedish). Lund: Studentlitteratur. ISBN 9144011091. SELIBR 7275143.
- Cornell, Erik (1997). Turkiet på Europas tröskel [Turkey on Europe's doorstep] (in Swedish). Lund: Studentlitteratur. ISBN 9144003625. SELIBR 7274574.

Diplomatic posts
Preceded by None	Chargé d'affaires of Sweden to North Korea; 1975–1977	Succeeded by Karlerik Nordenquist
Preceded by Hans-Olle Olsson	Ambassador of Sweden to Mali; 1983–1988	Succeeded by Bengt Holmquist
Preceded by Knut Bernström	Ambassador of Sweden to Senegal; 1983–1988	Succeeded by Bengt Holmquist
Preceded by Knut Bernström	Ambassador of Sweden to Mauritania; 1983–1988	Succeeded by Bengt Holmquist
Preceded by Knut Bernström	Ambassador of Sweden to the Gambia; 1983–1988	Succeeded by Bengt Holmquist
Preceded by Cai Melin	Ambassador of Sweden to Liberia; 1983–1988	Succeeded by Bengt Holmquist
Preceded by Cai Melin	Ambassador of Sweden to Guinea; 1983–1988	Succeeded by Bengt Holmquist
Preceded by Cai Melin	Ambassador of Sweden to Sierra Leone; 1983–1988	Succeeded by Bengt Holmquist
Preceded by Cai Melin	Ambassador of Sweden to Niger; 1983–1988	Succeeded by Bengt Holmquist
Preceded by Lennart Dafgård	Ambassador of Sweden to Turkey; 1990–1995	Succeeded by Michael Sahlin
