= Bengt Holmquist =

Swedish diplomat (1926–1993)

- Born: Bengt Carl Gustaf Holmquist; 27 October 1926; Arvidsjaur, Sweden
- Died: 11 November 1993 (aged 67); Saltsjöbaden, Sweden
- Burial place: Norra begravningsplatsen
- Education: Lund University
- Occupation: Diplomat
- Years active: 1953–1992
- Spouse: Marianne Svedman (m. 1961)
- Children: 1

Bengt Carl Gustaf Holmquist (27 October 1926 – 11 November 1993) is a Swedish diplomat who joined the Ministry for Foreign Affairs in 1953. Over a career spanning nearly four decades, he held diplomatic posts in Europe, Asia, and at the United Nations, and served as deputy chief of protocol at the ministry. He was Sweden's ambassador to Libya from 1977 and later consul general in Munich. From 1988, he served as ambassador-at-large to several West African countries, retiring in 1992.

== Early life ==
Holmquist was born on 27 October 1926 in Arvidsjaur, Norrbotten County, Sweden, the son of district veterinarian John Holmquist and his wife, Disa (née Lundh). He became a reserve officer in the Swedish Air Force in 1949 and earned a Candidate of Law degree from Lund University in 1951.

== Career ==
Holmquist joined the Ministry for Foreign Affairs as an attaché in 1953. He served in Bonn in 1954, Vienna in 1956, Budapest in 1957, and Vienna again in 1958. That same year, he became a second secretary at the Ministry for Foreign Affairs and served as secretary to Foreign Minister Östen Undén. In 1961, he was appointed first legation secretary at Sweden's mission to the United Nations in New York City. He subsequently served as first embassy secretary in The Hague in 1963 and in Bern in 1965, where he became counsellor of embassy in 1968. In 1969, he was appointed deputy chief of protocol at the Ministry for Foreign Affairs. From 1973, he served as counsellor of embassy in New Delhi, Colombo, and Kathmandu.

In 1977, he was appointed ambassador to Tripoli, Libya. During his tenure as Sweden's ambassador to Libya, Holmquist reported to the Ministry for Foreign Affairs on the planned cooperation between the Swedish state-owned company Telub and Libya. In January 1978, he expressed reservations about plans to train Libyan military personnel in Sweden, noting that such an arrangement could create political unease. His report was circulated within the Government Offices and became part of the subsequent handling of the matter. Holmquist continued to report on the Telub affair and on Swedish-Libyan relations.

In 1983, Holmquist was appointed consul general in Munich. From 1988, he served as ambassador-at-large for a number of West African countries, with his base in Stockholm. His responsibilities included Liberia, where he was accredited from 1988, as well as Mali, Guinea, Senegal, Sierra Leone, The Gambia, Niger, and Mauritania. He was accredited to Sierra Leone from 1989 and to Niger and Mauritania from 1990. Holmquist retired in the autumn of 1992.

== Personal life ==
On 3 February 1961, Holmquist married Marianne Svedman (1926–2002) at Storkyrkan in Stockholm. She was the daughter of factory owner John Svedman and Anna (née Finnér). They had one daughter, Charlotte, who was born in 1961.

== Death ==
Holmquist died on 11 November 1993 in Saltsjöbaden Parish, Nacka Municipality, Stockholm County. He was interred on 1 December 1993 at Norra begravningsplatsen in Stockholm.

== Awards and decorations ==
- (West Germany) Grand Cross of Merit of the Order of Merit of the Federal Republic of Germany (23 June 1970)
- (Norway) Commander of the Order of St. Olav (1973)
- Decoration of Honour in Silver for Services to the Republic of Austria (1958)

Diplomatic posts
Preceded by Torsten Hylander	Ambassador of Sweden to Libya; 1977–1983	Succeeded by Sven E. Jonsson
Preceded by Nils-Rune Larsson	Consul General of Sweden to Munich; 1983–1987	Succeeded by Mats Elgqvist
Preceded by Erik Cornell	Ambassador of Sweden to Liberia; 1988–1992	Succeeded by Annie Marie Sundbom
Preceded by Erik Cornell	Ambassador of Sweden to Mali; 1989–1992	Succeeded by Magnus Faxén
Preceded by Erik Cornell	Ambassador of Sweden to Guinea; 1989–1992	Succeeded by Magnus Faxén
Preceded by Erik Cornell	Ambassador of Sweden to Senegal; 1989–1992	Succeeded by Magnus Faxén
Preceded by Erik Cornell	Ambassador of Sweden to Sierra Leone; 1989–1992	Succeeded by Annie Marie Sundbom
Preceded by Erik Cornell	Ambassador of Sweden to the Gambia; 1990–1992	Succeeded by Annie Marie Sundbom
Preceded by Erik Cornell	Ambassador of Sweden to Niger; 1989–1992	Succeeded by Magnus Faxén
Preceded by Erik Cornell	Ambassador of Sweden to Mauritania; 1989–1992	Succeeded by Magnus Faxén
