= Bo Siegbahn =

Swedish diplomat and politician

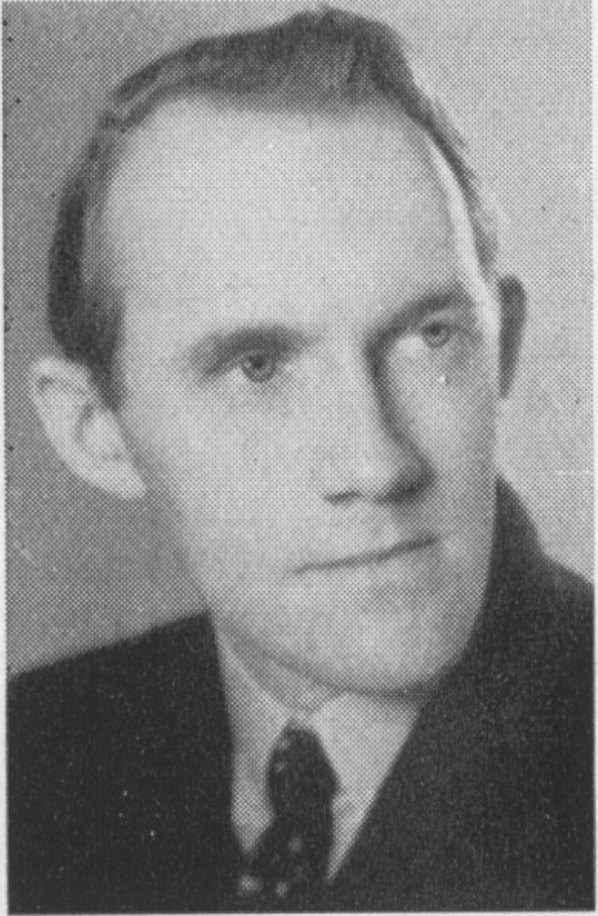
- Born: Bo Lennart Georg Siegbahn; 25 February 1915; Lund, Sweden
- Died: 7 January 2008 (aged 92); Stockholm, Sweden
- Education: Uppsala University
- Occupations: Politician, diplomat
- Years active: 1937–1982
- Spouse: Colette Renard (m. 1943)
- Children: 3
- Relatives: Manne Siegbahn (father); Kai Siegbahn (brother)

Bo Lennart Georg Siegbahn (25 February 1915 – 7 January 2008) was a Swedish diplomat and politician who served in the Swedish Riksdag from 1957 to 1961.

== Early life ==
Siegbahn was born on 25 February 1915 in Lund, Sweden as the eldest of two sons of the physicist Manne Siegbahn and his wife, Karin (née Högbom). He grew up in Lund and in Uppsala from 1922, when his father was appointed to a professorship there. Manne Siegbahn received the Nobel Prize in Physics in 1924, and Bo Siegbahn's younger brother Kai Siegbahn was awarded the same prize in 1981.

Siegbahn passed studentexamen in Stockholm in 1933 and received a Bachelor of Arts degree from Uppsala University in 1934 and a Candidate of Law degree from Uppsala University in 1937.

== Career ==
=== Diplomatic career ===
Siegbahn served in Stockholm City Court from 1937 to 1938 before joining Ministry for Foreign Affairs as an attaché in 1940. He was posted to Vichy in 1940, then to New York City in 1941, Washington, D.C. in 1943, and the Swedish Foreign Ministry in 1945 as second secretary. He then moved to the National Swedish Board of Civil Aviation (Luftfartsstyrelsen) in 1946, returned to the Foreign Ministry as first secretary in 1948, and worked with the Ministry of Supply from 1948 to 1950. Siegbahn was secretary in the Long-Term Planning Commission (långtidsutredningen) from 1950 to 1951. From 1954 to 1957, he served as first secretary at the Embassy in New Delhi.

He was director (byråchef) at the Foreign Ministry from 1957 to 1962, counselor at the embassy in Rome from 1962 to 1963, and ambassador to Rabat and Dakar from 1963 to 1966 and to Tel Aviv from 1966 to 1970. He was on leave from 1970 to 1973.

=== Political career ===
Politically active as a Social Democrat, he was a member of the Första kammaren of the Swedish Riksdag from 1957 to 1961, but later switched political allegiances and returned to the (now unicameral) Riksdag as a member representing the liberal-conservative (centre-right) Moderate Party from 1974 to 1982.

Siegbahn wrote articles in newspapers and journals such as Tiden, Svensk utrikeshandel, Svensk handel, Ekonomisk revy, Industria, Svensk sparbankstidskrift, Var, när och hur, Utrikespolitik.

Siegbahn was one of several people to be suspected as the author of a series of political satirical novels published under the pseudonym Bo Baldersson.

== Personal life ==
In 1943, Siegbahn married Colette Renard (1916–2008), the daughter of Louis Renard and Marguerite Marchal. They had three children: Sten (born 1943), Jan (born 1945), and Mireille (born 1950). They were residents of Saint-Germain-en-Laye, France.

== Death ==
Bo Siegbahn's wife, Colette, died on 2 December 2007. He died a few weeks later, on 7 January 2008.

== Awards and decorations ==
- (Netherlands) Officer of the Order of Orange-Nassau

== Bibliography ==
- Siegbahn, Bo (1971). Den svenska säkerheten: essäer om utrikespolitik, svenska världsförbättrare - och Marx [The Swedish security: essays on foreign policy, Swedish world improvers - and Marx] (in Swedish). Stockholm: Bonnier. SELIBR 8081450.
- Tallroth, Tore; Siegbahn, Bo (1964). Aspetti della Svezia moderna [Aspects of modern Sweden]. [Offsetskrifter på italienska] / Istituto svedese; 1 (in Italian). Stockholm: Svenska institutet. SELIBR 20209100.

Diplomatic posts
Preceded by Lennart Petri	Ambassador of Sweden to Morocco; 1963–1966	Succeeded by Lars von Celsing
Preceded by None	Ambassador of Sweden to Senegal; 1963–1966	Succeeded by Lars von Celsing
Preceded by Inga Thorsson	Ambassador of Sweden to Israel; 1966–1970	Succeeded by Sten Sundfeldt
