= List of ambassadors of Sweden to Spain =

Ambassador of Sweden to Spain
- Lesser coat of arms of the Kingdom of Sweden

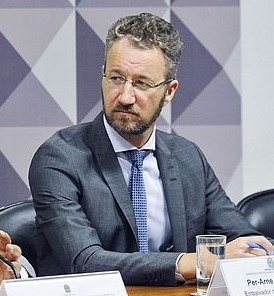
- Incumbent; Per-Arne Hjelmborn since 2024
- Ministry for Foreign Affairs; Swedish Embassy, Madrid
- Style: His or Her Excellency (formal); Mr. or Madam Ambassador (informal)
- Reports to: Minister for Foreign Affairs
- Residence: Calle de Zurbano 27 (Note: The ambassador's residence is at the same location as the chancery.)
- Seat: Madrid, Spain
- Appointer: Government of Sweden
- Term length: No fixed term
- Inaugural holder: Peter Axel Fleming
- Formation: 1748
- Website: Swedish Embassy, Madrid

The Ambassador of Sweden to Spain (known formally as the Ambassador of the Kingdom of Sweden to the Kingdom of Spain) is the official representative of the government of Sweden to the monarch and government of Spain.

== History ==
In 1956, an agreement was reached between the Swedish and Spanish governments on the mutual elevation of the respective countries' legations to embassies. The diplomatic rank was thereafter changed to ambassador instead of envoy extraordinary and minister plenipotentiary.

== List of representatives ==
Name	Period	Title	Notes	Presented credentials	Ref
Kingdom of Spain (1700–1808)
Peter Axel Fleming	1748–1752	Envoy	Died in office.		
Carl Leuhusen	1752–1755	Chargé d'affaires			
Henrik Jacob Hildebrand	1754–1762	Envoy			
Gustaf Philip Creutz	1762–1766	Envoy			
Fredrik Ulrik von Friesendorff	1766–1770	Envoy			
Bengt Sparre	1771–1776	Envoy			
Malte Ramel	1779–1780	Envoy			
Gustaf d'Albedyhll	1783–1784	Envoy			
Fredric Löwenhielm	1781–1783	Envoy			
Carl August Ehrensvärd	4 September 1783 – 1799	Envoy			
Carl Gustaf Adlerberg	16 September 1783 – 1784	Chargé d'affaires			
Carl Fredrik von Heland	1785–1790	Chargé d'affaires			
Carl Gustaf Adlerberg	29 June 1798 – 1805	Chargé d'affaires			
Carl Gustaf Adlerberg	1 March 1805 – 8 July 1806	Envoy			
Kingdom of the Spains and the Indies (1808–1813)
Carl Gustaf Adlerberg	21 October 1808 – 20 March 1809	Envoy			
Kingdom of the Spains and the Indies (1810–1873)
Jacob Gustaf De la Gardie	2 October 1813 – December 1815	Envoy			
Gustaf Daniel Lorichs	1814–1816	Chargé d'affaires ad interim			
Gustaf Daniel Lorichs	1816 – 9 July 1852	Chargé d'affaires			
Johan Henrik Tawast	14 February 1821 – ?	Envoy extraordinary and minister plenipotentiary	This mission was not carried out.		
Johan Wilhelm Bergman	1852–1865	Resident minister			
Eugène von Stedingk	17 November 1865 – 21 January 1869	Resident minister			
Lave Gustaf Beck-Friis	7 October 1868 – 1869	Chargé d‘affaires ad interim			
Frans Theodor Lindstrand	21 January 1869 – 11 February 1873 (Note: The 11 February 1873 was the start of the First Spanish Republic when King Amadeo I abdicated from the Spanish throne.)	Resident minister			
First Spanish Republic (1873–1874)
Frans Theodor Lindstrand	11 February 1873 – 29 December 1874 (Note: The 29 December 1874 was the end of the First Spanish Republic and the start of the Restoration.)	Resident minister			
Kingdom of Spain (Bourbon) (1874–1931)
Frans Theodor Lindstrand	29 December 1874 – 1877	Resident minister			
Henrik Åkerman	1877–1882	Resident minister			
Henrik Åkerman	1882–1884	Minister plenipotentiary			
Johan Anton Wolff Grip	1884–1889	Minister plenipotentiary			
Arild Huitfeldt	1890 – 21 April 1891	Minister plenipotentiary	Died in office.		
Fritz Wedel Jarlsberg	1891–1897	Minister plenipotentiary			
Ove Gude	1897–1902	Envoy			
Fritz Wedel Jarlsberg	1902–1905	Envoy			
Robert Sager	1905–1907	Envoy	Also accredited to Lisbon.		
Carl Haraldsson Strömfelt	1907–1913	Envoy	Also accredited to Lisbon.		
Gustaf Falkenberg	28 November 1913 – 26 August 1917	Envoy	Also accredited to Lisbon. Died in office.	19 February 1914 to King Alfonso XIII.	
Augustin Beck-Friis	4 December 1917 – 1920	Envoy extraordinary and minister plenipotentiary	Also accredited to Lisbon.	4 March 1918 to King Alfonso XIII.	
Ivan Danielsson	1921–1922	Envoy	Also accredited to Lisbon.	31 March 1921 to King Alfonso XIII.	
Wollmar Boström	1922–1925	Envoy	Also accredited to Lisbon.		
Ivan Danielsson	1925–1931	Envoy	Also accredited to Lisbon.		
Second Spanish Republic (1931–1939) and the Spanish State (1936–1975)
Ivan Danielsson	1931–1937	Envoy	Also accredited to Lisbon.		
Erik Wisén	1936–1939	Chargé d'affaires ad interim	Based in Barcelona.		
Nils Berencreutz	2 December 1938 – 31 March 1939	Agent	Based in Burgos.		
Nils Berencreutz	1 April 1939 – 1939	Chargé d'affaires ad interim			
Karl Ivan Westman	1939–1941	Envoy		27 May 1939 to Head of State Francisco Franco	
Joen Lagerberg	28 March 1941 – 1942	Envoy			
Karl Ivan Westman	1942–1945	Envoy		13 November 1942 to Head of State Francisco Franco	
Nils Berencreutz	1948–1951	Chargé d'affaires ad interim			
Wilhelm Winther	1 February 1951 – 8 March 1956	Envoy			
Wilhelm Winther	9 March 1956 – 1958	Ambassador			
Herbert Ribbing	1958–1963	Ambassador		March 1958 to Head of State Francisco Franco	
Carl-Herbert Borgenstierna	1964–1968	Ambassador			
Jan Stenström	1969–1972	Ambassador			
Knut Bernström	1973–1975	Ambassador			
Kingdom of Spain (1975–present)
Knut Bernström	1975–1976	Ambassador			
Lennart Petri	1976–1980	Ambassador			
Carl-George Crafoord	1980–1986	Ambassador			
Karl-Anders Wollter	1986–1989	Ambassador			
Ulf Hjertonsson	1989–1995	Ambassador			
Tomas Bertelman	1995–2000	Ambassador	Also accredited to Andorra.		
Lars Grundberg	2000–2005	Ambassador	Also accredited to Andorra.		
Anders Rönquist	2005–2010	Ambassador	Also accredited to Andorra.	26 September 2005 to King Juan Carlos I.	
Jörgen Persson	1 September 2010 – 2011	Chargé d'affaires			
Cecilia Julin	2011–2016	Ambassador	Also accredited to Andorra.	10 January 2012 to King Juan Carlos I.	
Lars-Hjalmar Wide	September 2016 – 2019	Ambassador	Also accredited to Andorra.	29 September 2016 to King Felipe VI.	
Teppo Tauriainen	1 September 2019 – 2024	Ambassador	Also accredited to Andorra.	27 November 2019 to King Felipe VI.	
Per-Arne Hjelmborn	2024–present	Ambassador	Also accredited to Andorra.	11 November 2024 to King Felipe VI.	

== See also ==
- Spain–Sweden relations
