= Karl Ivan Westman =

Swedish diplomat

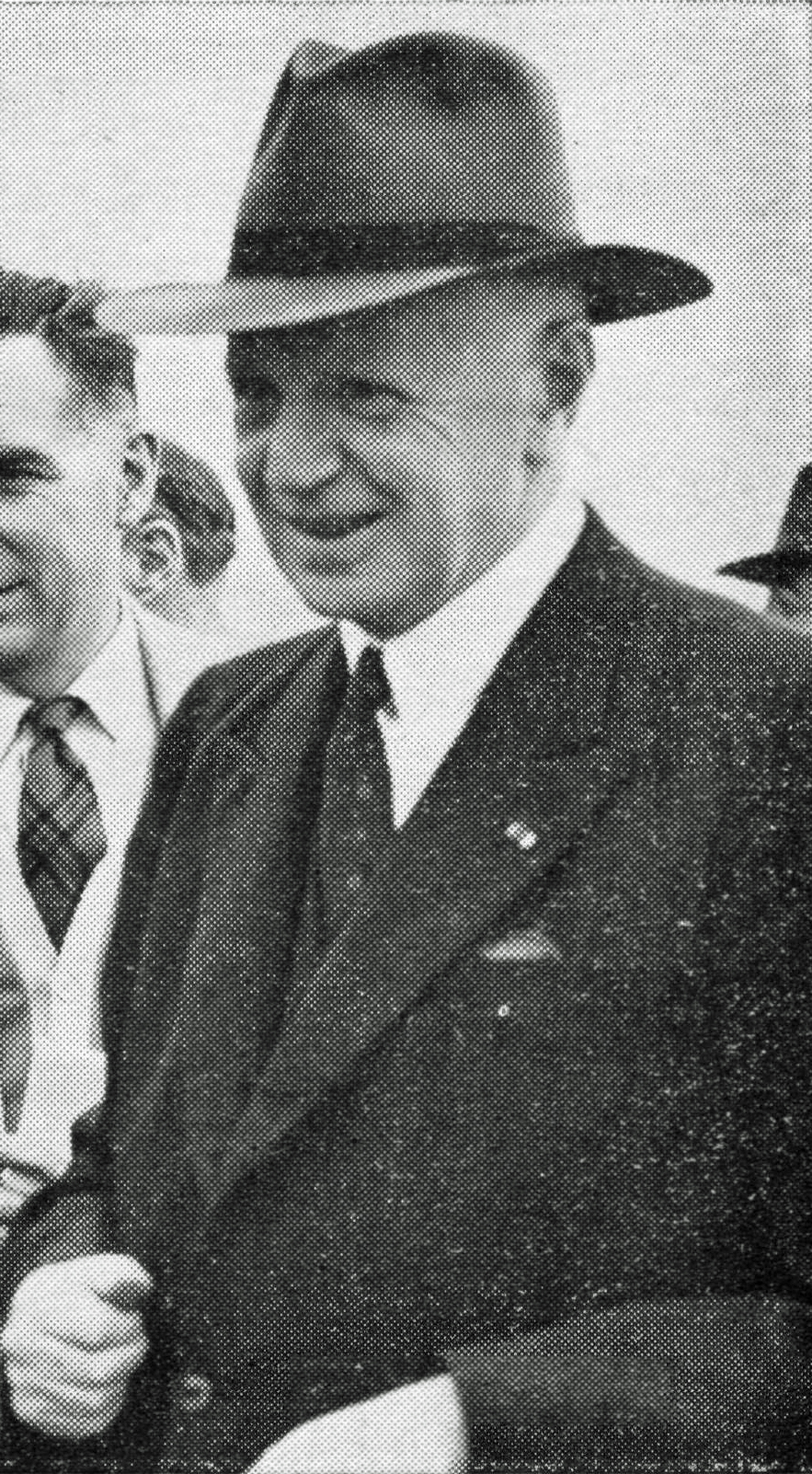
- Westman in 1953

Envoy/Ambassador of Sweden to France
- In office 1947–1956
- Preceded by: Erik Boheman
- Succeeded by: Ragnar Kumlin

State Secretary for Foreign Affairs
- In office 1945–1947
- Preceded by: Stig Sahlin
- Succeeded by: Hans Beck-Friis

Envoy of Sweden to Spain
- In office 1942–1945
- Preceded by: Joen Lagerberg
- Succeeded by: Nils Berencreutz

Envoy of Sweden to Finland
- In office 1941–1942
- Preceded by: Stig Sahlin
- Succeeded by: Hans Beck-Friis

Envoy of Sweden to Spain
- In office 1939–1941
- Preceded by: Nils Berencreutz
- Succeeded by: Joen Lagerberg

Envoy of Sweden to Switzerland
- In office 1928–1939
- Preceded by: Einar Hennings
- Succeeded by: Hans Beck-Friis

Personal details
- Born: 5 August 1889 Linköping, Sweden
- Died: 24 April 1970 (aged 80) Paris, France
- Relatives: Karl Gustaf Westman (brother)
- Education: Linköpings högre allmänna läroverk Uppsala University
- Occupation: Diplomat

Karl Ivan Westman (5 August 1889 – 24 April 1970) was a Swedish diplomat whose career spanned key roles in both national administration and international diplomacy. He entered the Swedish Ministry for Foreign Affairs in 1917 and quickly advanced, working on the reorganization of the foreign service and taking part in international conferences during the early 1920s. By the mid-1920s, he held senior positions within the ministry, including head of the Political and Trade Policy Department, and represented Sweden in League of Nations disarmament efforts. In 1928, he became envoy to Bern.

During the 1930s, Westman was deeply involved in multilateral diplomacy through the League of Nations, working on issues such as arms limitation, conflicts in East Asia and Africa, and refugee questions. He served as Swedish minister in Madrid from 1939 to 1941, where he monitored Spain's position during World War II, and again from 1942 to 1945. In between, he was posted to Helsinki (1941–1942), where he tried—unsuccessfully—to influence Finland to maintain neutrality, leading to his expulsion.

After the war, Westman held top administrative roles, including state secretary for foreign affairs (1945), and went on to become Sweden's ambassador to Paris in 1947. He also participated in the Paris Peace Treaties, represented Sweden at the United Nations, and was active in the Council of Europe. Late in his career, he served as chairman of the Administrative Tribunal of the OEEC (later OECD) from 1957 to 1963.

== Early life ==
Westman was born on 5 August 1889 in Linköping, Sweden, the son of the postmaster Karl Johan Westman (died 1899) and his wife Tonny Andersson (1858–1946). He had four brothers, including Minister of Justice Karl Gustaf "KG" Westman (1876–1944) and Member of Parliament Karl Allan Westman (1883–1948). When his father died in 1899, heavily in debt, he had for several years been suspended from his position. The person who gave the eldest son, KG, room to grow and became a support for the whole family was the wealthy captain Henric Westman (who was not a relative).

Westman passed his mogenhetsexamen in Linköping and then studied at Uppsala University, where he received a Bachelor of Arts degree in 1910 and a Candidate of Law degree in 1914. During his studies, he was chairman of the Heimdal Society from 1912 to 1913.

== Career ==
=== Early career and foreign service ===
Westman completed his district court service between 1914 and 1917 and was appointed attaché at the Ministry for Foreign Affairs in 1917. He served as acting first secretary in 1918 and, from 1918 to 1923, was secretary to the committee for the reorganization of the Swedish foreign service. During this period, he also briefly served as acting legation secretary in Paris in 1919.

In 1921, Westman participated as an expert at the International Conference on Communications and Transit in Barcelona and was appointed legation secretary in Kristiania (Oslo). He continued to take on international assignments, serving as an expert to the International Commission of the Oder in 1923. That same year, he became legation counsellor and head of department at the Ministry for Foreign Affairs, and was a delegate to the Communications and Transit Conference in Geneva.

Westman advanced within the ministry during the 1920s. In 1924, he became acting head of the Personnel and Administrative Department, and in 1925 was appointed head of the Political and Trade Policy Department. He also represented Sweden in the League of Nations' disarmament commission from 1928 to 1930 and took part in international efforts related to arms limitation. In 1928, he served as acting state secretary for foreign affairs and was appointed envoy to Bern later that year.

=== International engagements in the 1930s ===
During the early 1930s, Westman participated in international efforts on arms limitation, including his role as a delegate to the Conference for the Reduction and Limitation of Armaments in 1932. In 1934, he became a member of a League of Nations committee dealing with the conflict between China and Japan. Between 1935 and 1936, he served on the League's expert commission concerning the Italo-Ethiopian War. He also took part in international initiatives concerning refugees from Germany in 1936 and 1938, and in 1938 chaired committees within the League of Nations, including the council committee on the Alexandretta dispute and the economic and financial coordination committee.

=== Spain (1939–1941, 1942–1945) ===
After leaving his post in Bern in 1938, Westman was appointed Swedish minister in Madrid following the end of the Spanish Civil War. He had previously been active in the work of the League of Nations in Geneva and had represented Swedish policy critical of the Franco regime, which contributed to his initial reluctance to accept the Madrid post. At the time, the position was not considered of major importance for Swedish diplomacy. Westman presented his credentials in Burgos on 27 May 1939. During the ceremony, he avoided performing the fascist salute by instead tipping his hat. In his early reports, he assessed Spain's situation as marked by significant political, economic, and social challenges following the civil war.

At the end of the war, the Franco regime faced a difficult situation in which it had to overcome the numerous political, economic, and social problems that three years of civil war had brought about. Spain's geopolitical and military importance would change radically with the start of World War II. It would be Westman's responsibility to be aware of, and report to Stockholm on, the possibility of Spain joining the Axis powers. Westman thought that possibility quite remote, despite the Falangist sympathies for Nazi Germany and Fascist Italy and the pressure from Hitler and Mussolini, because Spain was truly not in a position to face another war without risking a major economic and social catastrophe.

In general, Westman was critical of the Franco regime, but his view was not entirely negative. He reported on the enormous economic and social conflicts and the resistance of the upper classes to reforms. Franco himself, Westman thought, seemed convinced of the need to reduce social tension, and the unified Falange, despite everything, represented the only organized force with a vision for the future. At the end of his mission to Spain in March 1941, Westman concluded that the regime would hardly survive a defeat of the European dictatorships in World War II.

=== Finland (1941–1942) ===
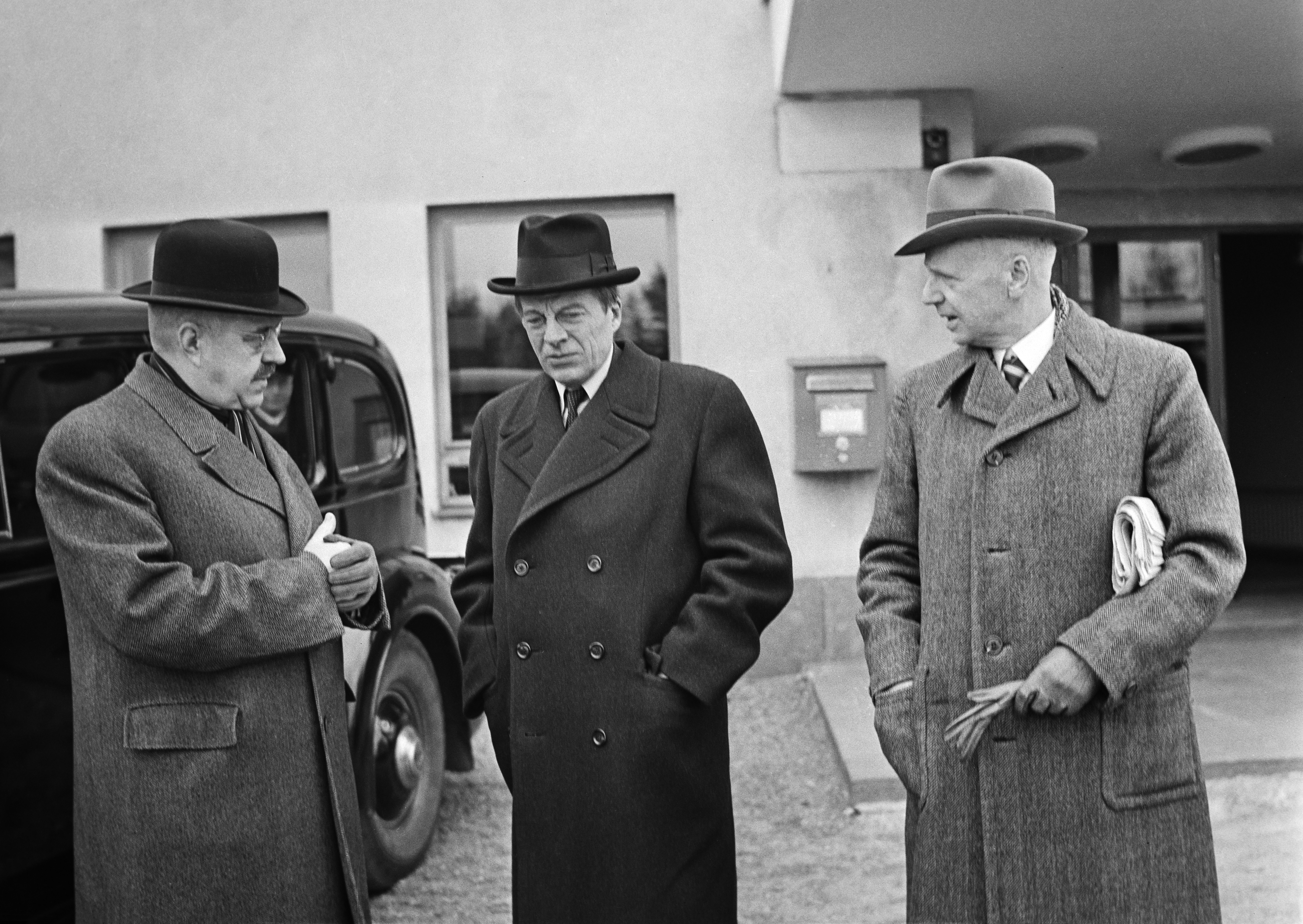
Westman (right) and Finnish Foreign Minister Rolf Witting (left) receive Swedish Foreign Minister Christian Günther at Malmi Airfield 6 May 1941.

In 1941, Westman was appointed Swedish minister in Helsinki. During his tenure, he sought to encourage Finland to maintain its declared policy of neutrality during World War II and expressed concern over actions that might draw the country into the war on the side of Germany. After hostilities began between Finland and the Soviet Union, he worked to prevent a complete rupture between Finland and the Western powers.

Westman also advised the Finnish government to limit its military objectives to the recapture of previously lost territories (Hanko and Vyborg) and to avoid advancing beyond earlier borders. His position was not well received by Finnish authorities, and tensions escalated. In 1942, at the initiative of leading Finnish figures, he was declared persona non grata and requested to leave the country. Despite this, he retained the full confidence of the Swedish foreign ministry, which accepted his recall for diplomatic reasons.

=== Later career ===
After leaving Helsinki in 1942, Westman returned to his post in Madrid, where he served until 1945. He then served as secretary of the Advisory Council on Foreign Affairs from 1945 to 1946 and was appointed state secretary for foreign affairs in 1945 in connection with a change in Swedish government leadership.

In 1947, he became ambassador to Paris and served as a delegate to the Paris Peace Treaties that same year. He later represented Sweden at sessions of the United Nations General Assembly in 1948 and 1951, and served as deputy to the minister for foreign affairs in the Committee of Ministers of the Council of Europe from 1949 to 1954.

From 1957 to 1963, Westman served as chairman of the Administrative Tribunal of the Organisation for European Economic Co-operation (OEEC) (later the OECD).

== Legacy ==
The historian Wilhelm M. Carlgren's assessment is that Westman was a leading figure in the Swedish foreign service—quick-witted and critical, but more respected than liked.

Sture Petrén, in an obituary, described Karl Ivan Westman as "a highly capable and principled civil servant who made significant contributions to Swedish public administration and diplomacy, distinguished by his intellectual breadth, sound judgment, and independence of mind, and by his ability to approach complex legal and political issues with balance and clarity rather than ideology. He was a reliable and effective administrator, combining analytical skill with practical sense, and his diplomatic career—particularly his time as Sweden's ambassador in Paris—was marked by tact, intelligence, and composure during a challenging period."

The librarian Torsten Dahl described Westman as "a man with broad cultural and literary interests, regarded as one of Sweden's most skilled and best-trained diplomats, and whose name has on several occasions been considered when it has been a question of appointing a minister for foreign affairs."

== Death ==
Westman, who never married, died on 24 April 1970 in Paris, France. He was interred on 9 May 1970 in the Westman family grave at the Northern Cemetery Grounds in his howntown of Linköping.

== Awards and decorations ==
=== Swedish ===
- (Sweden) King Gustaf V's Jubilee Commemorative Medal (1928)
- (Sweden) Commander Grand Cross of the Order of the Polar Star (6 June 1936)
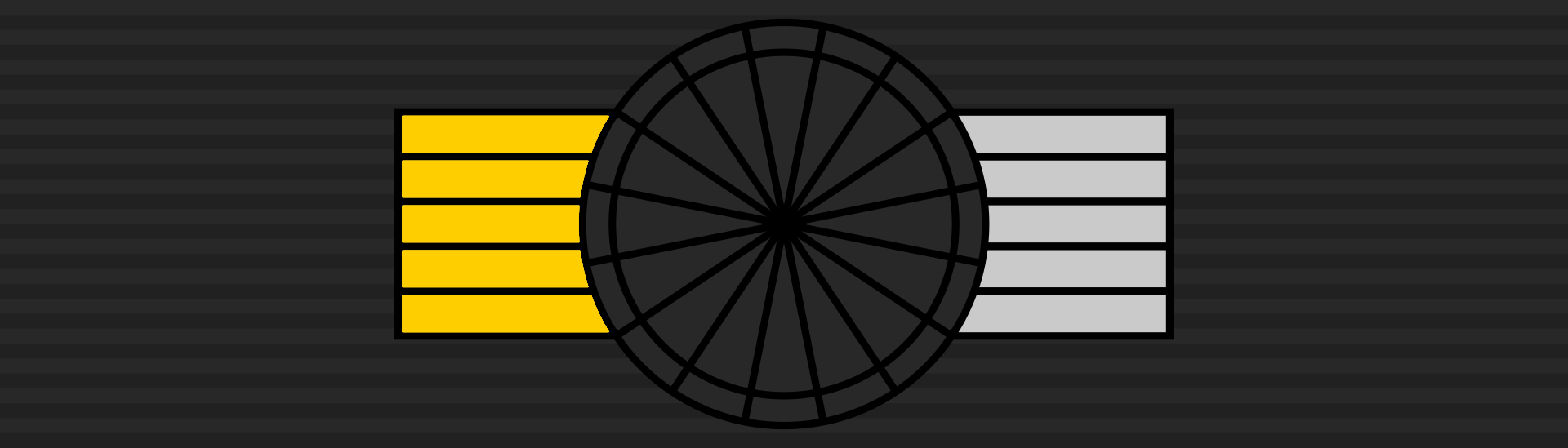
- (Sweden) Commander 1st Class of the Order of the Polar Star (28 November 1928)
- (Sweden) Knight of the Order of the Polar Star (1926)

=== Foreign ===
- (Belgium) Grand Officer of the Order of the Crown (before 1931)
- Commander 1st Class of the Order of the White Rose of Finland (before 1931)
- Knight 1st Class of the Order of the White Rose of Finland (before 1921)
- Grand Cross of the Order of the Lion of Finland (1 October 1942)
- (France) Grand Cross of the Legion of Honour (before 1968)
- (France) Commander of the Legion of Honour (before 1940)
- (France) Knight of the Legion of Honour (before 1925)
- (Greece) Grand Cross of the Order of George I (before 1950)
- (Italy) Officer of the Order of Saints Maurice and Lazarus (before 1925)
- (Latvia) Grand Cross of the Order of the Three Stars (before 1940)
- (Netherlands) Grand Cross of the Order of Orange-Nassau (1932)
- (Norway) Commander of the Order of St. Olav (before 1925)
- (Norway) Knight of the Order of St. Olav (before 1921)
- (Spain) Grand Cross of the Order of Isabella the Catholic (9 March 1942)

Diplomatic posts
Preceded by Einar Hennings	Envoy of Sweden to Switzerland; 1928–1939	Succeeded by Hans Gustaf Beck-Friis
Preceded by Nils Berencreutz	Envoy of Sweden to Spain; 1939–1941	Succeeded by Joen Lagerberg
Preceded by Stig Sahlin	Envoy of Sweden to Finland; 1941–1942	Succeeded by Hans Beck-Friis
Preceded by Joen Lagerberg	Envoy of Sweden to Spain; 1942–1945	Succeeded by Nils Berencreutz
Preceded by Stig Sahlin	State Secretary for Foreign Affairs; 1945–1947	Succeeded by Hans Beck-Friis
Preceded by Erik Boheman	Envoy/Ambassador of Sweden to France; 1947–1956	Succeeded by Ragnar Kumlin
