= List of ambassadors of Sweden to the Gambia =

Ambassador of Sweden to The Gambia
- Lesser coat of arms of the Kingdom of Sweden
- Incumbent; Katrin Månsson since 2025
- Ministry for Foreign Affairs
- Style: His or Her Excellency (formal); Mr. or Madam Ambassador (informal)
- Reports to: Minister for Foreign Affairs
- Seat: Stockholm, Sweden (Note: The Swedish ambassador to The Gambia is resident in Stockholm, Sweden.)
- Appointer: Government of Sweden
- Term length: No fixed term
- Formation: November 1967
- First holder: Lars von Celsing

The Ambassador of Sweden to The Gambia (known formally as the Ambassador of the Kingdom of Sweden to Republic of The Gambia) is the official representative of the government of Sweden to the president of the Gambia and government of the Gambia. Since Sweden does not have an embassy in Banjul, Sweden's ambassador to The Gambia is based in Stockholm, Sweden.

== History ==
Following the proclamation of the independence of the State of Gambia on 18 February 1965, Swedish prime minister Tage Erlander, in a congratulatory telegram to Prime Minister Dawda Jawara, stated that the Swedish government recognized Gambia as a sovereign and independent state and expressed the Swedish government's desire to maintain friendly and cordial relations with Gambia.

In November 1967, the Swedish ambassador in Rabat, Morocco, Lars von Celsing, was appointed to also serve as ambassador to Bathurst (now Banjul), Gambia. The ambassador was concurrently accredited to Gambia from Rabat, Morocco, until 1983, when a Stockholm-based ambassador-at-large, who was also ambassador to a number of other countries in West Africa, took over the accreditation.

After Sweden opened an embassy in Dakar, Senegal, in 2000, the Swedish ambassador there was concurrently accredited to Banjul, Gambia. The embassy in Dakar closed in 2010, after which the Swedish ambassador in Abuja, Nigeria, was accredited to Gambia. Since 2014, Sweden's ambassador to Gambia has once again been a Stockholm-based ambassador-at-large for West Africa.

== List of representatives ==
Name	Period	Title	Notes	Presented credentials	Ref
The Gambia (monarchy) (1965–1970)
Lars von Celsing	November 1967 – 1970	Ambassador	Resident in Rabat		
The Gambia (republic) (1970–present)
Lars von Celsing	1970–1972	Ambassador	Resident in Rabat		
Åke Sjölin	1972–1976	Ambassador	Resident in Rabat		
Knut Bernström	1977–1983	Ambassador	Resident in Rabat		
Erik Cornell	1983–1988	Ambassador	Resident in Stockholm		
–	1988–1990	Ambassador	Vacant		
Bengt Holmquist	1990–1992	Ambassador	Resident in Stockholm		
Annie Marie Sundbom	1992–1997	Ambassador	Resident in Stockholm		
Arne Ekfelt	1997–1998	Ambassador	Resident in Stockholm		
–	1999–1999	Ambassador	Vacant		
Bo Wilén	2000–2002	Ambassador	Resident in Dakar		
Annika Magnusson	2002–2005	Ambassador	Resident in Dakar		
Agneta Bohman	2006–2010	Ambassador	Resident in Dakar		
Per Lindgärde	2010–2012	Ambassador	Resident in Abuja		
Svante Kilander	2012–2014	Ambassador	Resident in Abuja		
Per Carlson	2014–2017	Ambassador	Resident in Stockholm		
Maria Leissner	2019–2021	Ambassador	Resident in Stockholm	24 April 2019	
Mia Rimby	2021–2025	Ambassador	Resident in Stockholm		
Katrin Månsson	2025–present	Ambassador	Resident in Stockholm		
