= Eva Emnéus =

Swedish diplomat (born 1953)

Her Excellency Eva Emnéus
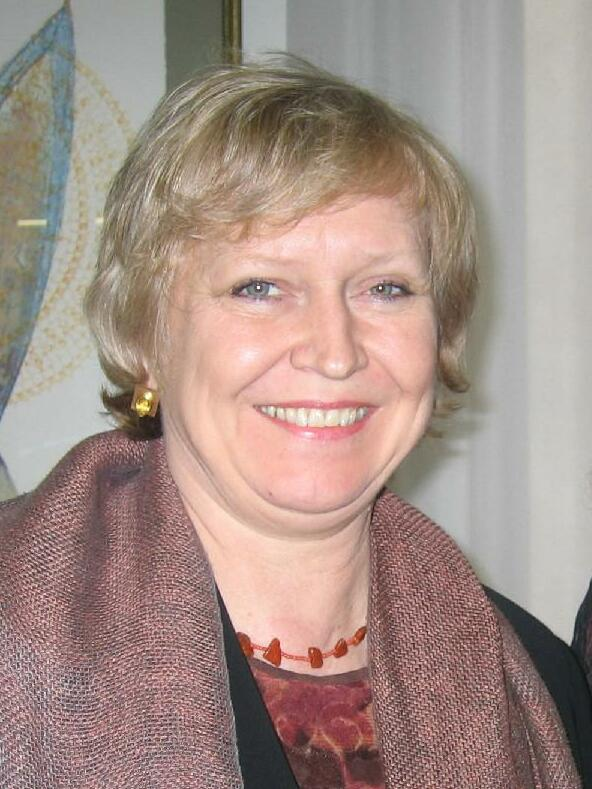
- Emnéus in 2013

Ambassador of Sweden to Mali
- In office September 2013 – September 2018
- Preceded by: Carin Wall
- Succeeded by: Diana Janse

Ambassador of Sweden to Algeria
- In office 2008–2013
- Preceded by: Helena Nilsson Lannegren
- Succeeded by: Carin Wall

Personal details
- Born: Eva Marianne Emnéus; 29 March 1953 (age 73) Stockholm, Sweden
- Education: Stockholm University (BAS)
- Occupation: Diplomat

Eva Marianne Emnéus (born 29 March 1953) is a Swedish diplomat became the ambassador to Mali from 2013 to 2018, and Algeria from 2008 to 2013.

== Education ==
Emnéus pursued a Bachelor of Applied Science (BAS) at Stockholm University.

== Diplomatic career ==
Emnéus started touring Djenné with the accomplishments of her nation on 18 November 2014. 35 agro-forestry operators in the circle would get agricultural equipment during this transfer. She also went to certain government-financed reforestation patches and irrigated perimeters.

On 10 June 2016, Sweden requested Burkina Faso's backing for its bid to fill a non-permanent seat on the UN Security Council for the years 2017–2018. Emnéus continued by saying that, in light of the 250 Swedish soldiers stationed in Northern Mali, Sweden has demonstrated its increased solidarity with Africa. With Emnéus distributing eyeglasses on 21 December, a group of six NGOs and private businesses, led by the Swedish NGO New Vision, have united to provide free medical eye consultations, professional prescriptions and advice, and eyeglasses to at-risk Malian schoolchildren who are in need but cannot afford them.

In April 2017, Emnéus was featured in a short film that CONASCIPAL, SIPRI's partner organisation in Mali, made to highlight the present state of their peacebuilding efforts there. On 29 November, Sweden contributes around US$4.1 million to the Trust Fund in Support of Peace and Security in Mali. The first Swedish payment was formally signed with Emnéus by Mahamat Saleh Annadif. She received the Mali 07 shield to further solidify a partnership with the Swedish mission in Mali on 9 March 2018.

Diplomatic posts
Preceded by None (since 1995)	Chargé d'affaires of Sweden to the Democratic Republic of the Congo; 1998–2000	Succeeded by Erik Backman
Preceded by Helena Nilsson Lannegren	Ambassador of Sweden to Algeria; 2008–2013	Succeeded by Carin Wall
Preceded by Carin Wall	Ambassador of Sweden to Mali; 2013–2018	Succeeded by Jessica Svärdström
Preceded by Carin Wall	Ambassador of Sweden to Burkina Faso; 2013–2018	Succeeded by Jessica Svärdström
Preceded by ?	Ambassador of Sweden to Niger; 2015–2018	Succeeded by ?
Preceded by Carin Wall	Ambassador of Sweden to Mauritania; 2013–2018	Succeeded by Diana Janse
