= List of ambassadors of Sweden to Senegal =

Ambassador of Sweden to Senegal
- Lesser coat of arms of the Kingdom of Sweden
- Incumbent; Catharina Cappelin since 2025
- Ministry for Foreign Affairs; Swedish Embassy, Dakar
- Style: His or Her Excellency (formal); Mr. or Madam Ambassador (informal)
- Reports to: Minister for Foreign Affairs
- Seat: Dakar, Senegal
- Appointer: Government of Sweden
- Term length: No fixed term
- Inaugural holder: Bo Siegbahn
- Formation: 1963

The Ambassador of Sweden to Senegal (known formally as the Ambassador of the Kingdom of Sweden to the Republic of Senegal) is the official representative of the government of Sweden to the president of Senegal and government of Senegal.

== History ==
In May 1960, a Swedish delegation undertook a trip to West Africa in which nine countries were visited, including Senegal. The purpose of the journey was, among other things, to provide Swedish authorities with the supplementary information that was needed in order to comprehensively assess the appropriate extent of Swedish representation in this part of Africa. On 4 May, the delegation left Senegal's capital, Dakar.

Sweden recognized the Mali Federation (consisting of Senegal and the Sudanese Republic) as a sovereign and independent state on 20 June 1960, in connection with its declaration of independence. This recognition was announced by Acting Foreign Minister Carl Henrik Nordlander in a congratulatory telegram to Mali's Prime Minister, Modibo Keïta. At the same time, His Majesty the King also sent a congratulatory telegram.

In September 1960, after Senegal withdrew from the Mali Federation and proclaimed full independence, Sweden's Foreign Minister, Östen Undén, sent a telegram to Senegal's head of government, Mamadou Dia, stating that the Swedish government recognized the Republic of Senegal as a sovereign and independent state. He also expressed hope for friendly and cordial relations between the two countries.

The Swedish delegation that returned from a study and inspection trip to West Africa in May 1960 submitted its report to the Ministry for Foreign Affairs in January 1961. The report recommended opening a Swedish diplomatic mission in Monrovia, Liberia; Lagos, Nigeria; and a third mission in one of the West African republics belonging to the French Community, primarily in either Dakar, Senegal, or Abidjan, Ivory Coast. Ivory Coast was ultimately chosen, and an embassy was opened there at the end of 1963. Instead, the Swedish ambassador in Rabat, Morocco, was accredited to Dakar.

In February 1964, the ambassador in Rabat, Bo Siegbahn, presented his credentials to Senegal's President, Léopold Sédar Senghor. The Swedish ambassador in Rabat remained accredited in Dakar until 1983, when a Stockholm-based ambassador took over accreditation for Senegal and other West African states.

In 2000, Sweden opened an embassy in Dakar, but it closed ten years later, in 2010. During this period, the ambassador was based in Dakar and was accredited to neighboring countries. After the embassy closed in 2010, the ambassador was once again based in Stockholm.

In June 2024, the Swedish government announced its intention to close its embassies in Bamako, Mali and Ouagadougou, Burkina Faso and to open a new embassy in Dakar. On 18 September 2025, Catharina Cappelin presented her credentials as the new resident ambassador to Minister of Foreign Affairs Cheikh Niang.

== List of representatives ==
Name	Period	Resident / Non-resident	Title	Resident / Concurrent accreditation	Notes	Presented credentials	Ref
Bo Siegbahn	1963–1966	Non-resident	Ambassador	Resident in Rabat		February 1964	
Lars von Celsing	1967–1972	Non-resident	Ambassador	Resident in Rabat			
Åke Sjölin	1972–1976	Non-resident	Ambassador	Resident in Rabat			
Knut Bernström	1977–1983	Non-resident	Ambassador	Resident in Rabat			
Erik Cornell	1983–1988	Non-resident	Ambassador	Resident in Stockholm			
Bengt Holmquist	1989–1992	Non-resident	Ambassador	Resident in Stockholm			
Magnus Faxén	1992–1995	Non-resident	Ambassador	Resident in Stockholm			
Nils-Erik Schyberg	1996–1998	Non-resident	Ambassador	Resident in Stockholm			
–	1999–1999	Non-resident	Ambassador		Vacant		
Bo Wilén	2000–2002	Resident	Ambassador	Also accredited to Cape Verde, Gambia, Guinea, Guinea-Bissau, and Mali			
Annika Magnusson	2002–2005	Resident	Ambassador	Also accredited to Cape Verde, Gambia, Guinea, Guinea-Bissau, Mali, and Mauritania (from 2004)			
Agneta Bohman	2006–2010	Resident	Ambassador	Also accredited to Cape Verde, Gambia, Guinea, Guinea-Bissau, Liberia, Mali, Mauritania, and Sierra Leone			
?	2010–2014	Non-resident	Ambassador	Resident in Stockholm			
Per Carlson	2014–2017	Non-resident	Ambassador	Resident in Stockholm		16 September 2014	
–	2018–2018	Non-resident	Ambassador	Resident in Stockholm	Vacant		
Maria Leissner	2019–2021	Non-resident	Ambassador	Resident in Stockholm			
Mia Rimby	2022–2025	Non-resident	Ambassador	Resident in Stockholm			
Catharina Cappelin	2025–present	Resident	Ambassador	Also accredited to Mauritania		18 September 2025	
