= Tomas Bertelman =

Swedish diplomat (born 1945)

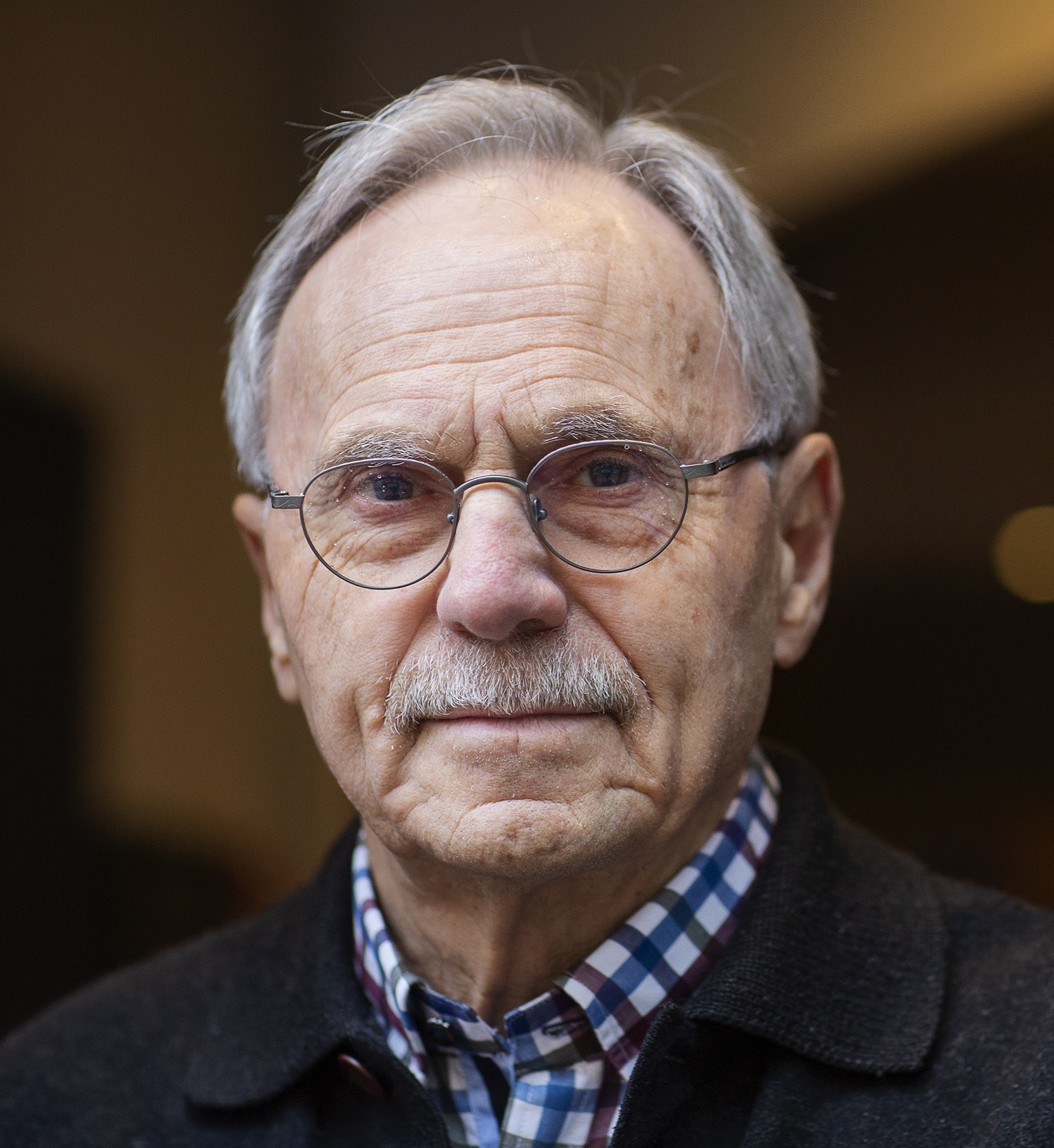
- Tomas Bertelman, March 2022.
- Born: Lars Peter Thomas Bertelman; 10 March 1945 (age 81); Lund, Sweden
- Education: Dartmouth College; Lund University
- Occupation: Diplomat
- Years active: 1971–2012
- Spouse: Elisabeth Romaeus (m. 1984)

Lars Peter Thomas Bertelman (born 10 March 1945) is a Swedish diplomat. Bertelman's career in the Swedish Ministry for Foreign Affairs began in 1971 and included a variety of roles. Early on, he served in Hanoi and London, before holding positions as counselor in Moscow and later as consul general in Leningrad. By 1995, he had risen to the role of ambassador in Madrid, where he served until 2000. He continued his ambassadorial career in Riga (2000–2003), Warsaw (2005–2008), and Moscow (2008–2012), where he presented his credentials to President Dmitry Medvedev in 2009. In 2012, he transitioned to the private sector as a strategic advisor for TeliaSonera in matters relating to Central Asia.

== Early life ==
Bertelman was born on 10 March 1945 in Lund, Sweden, the son of director Klas Bertelman and chief physician Kerstin (née Waller). He attended Dartmouth College in the United States from 1965 to 1966, and received a Bachelor of Arts degree from Lund University in 1971.

== Career ==
Bertelman joined the Ministry for Foreign Affairs in 1971. He served as secretary for the Secretariat for Futures Studies from 1975 to 1977, then as first secretary at the embassy in Hanoi from 1977 to 1979, and in London from 1979 to 1981. From 1981 to 1984, he worked as a desk officer (departementssekreterare) at the foreign ministry. He was Counselor at the embassy in Moscow from 1984 to 1987, followed by a role as deputy director (kansliråd) at the foreign ministry in 1987. He served as consul general in Leningrad from 1988 to 1989 and as administrative director (kanslichef) at the Committee on Foreign Affairs from 1989 to 1992. In 1992, he was appointed director (departementsråd) at the Foreign Ministry, and in 1995, he became ambassador in Madrid.

Bertelman served as ambassador in Madrid until 2000. He then held ambassadorial posts in Riga from 2000 to 2003, in Warsaw from 2005 to 2008, and in Moscow from 2008 to 2012. He presented his credentials to Russian President Dmitry Medvedev on 16 January 2009.

In October 2012, TeliaSonera assigned Bertelman to act as a strategic advisor in matters concerning the company's operations in Central Asia.

== Personal life ==
In 1984, Bertelman married social worker Elisabeth Romaeus (born 1947), the daughter of the dentist Ture Romaeus and home economics teacher Inga (née Friang).

Bertelman is currently fluent in Swedish, English, Spanish, French, Russian and German.

Diplomatic posts
Preceded by Bengt Åkerrén	Consul general of Sweden to Leningrad; 1988–1989	Succeeded by Dag Sebastian Ahlander
Preceded by Ulf Hjertonsson	Ambassador of Sweden to Spain; 1995–2000	Succeeded by Lars Grundberg
Preceded by None	Ambassador of Sweden to Andorra; 1995–2000	Succeeded by Lars Grundberg
Preceded by Hans Magnusson	Ambassador of Sweden to Latvia; 2000–2003	Succeeded by Göran Håkansson
Preceded by Mats Staffansson	Ambassador of Sweden to Poland; 2005–2008	Succeeded by Dag Hartelius
Preceded by Johan Molander	Ambassador of Sweden to Russia; 2008–2012	Succeeded by Veronika Bard Bringéus
