= Mohammed Knut Bernström =

Swedish diplomat (1919–2009)

- Born: Knut Johan Richard Bernström; 22 October 1919; Saltsjöbaden, Sweden
- Died: 21 October 2009 (aged 89); Larache, Morocco
- Education: Djursholms samskola Stockholm University College
- Occupation: Diplomat
- Years active: 1944–1983

Mohammed Knut Johan Richard Bernström, born Knut Johan Richard Bernström (22 October 1919 – 21 October 2009) was a former Swedish diplomat, who converted to Islam. He was also a Muslim scholar and translator of the Quran. As a diplomat, he worked in Spain, France, Soviet Union, United States, Brazil, Colombia, Venezuela and Morocco. He was the Swedish ambassador to Venezuela from 1963 to 1969, Spain from 1973 to 1976 and Morocco from 1976 to 1983.

== Early life ==
Bernström was born in 22 October 1919 in Saltsjöbaden, Sweden, the son of Seth Bernström, an engineer, and his wife Erna (née von Hillern-Flinsch). He received a Candidate of Law degree from Stockholm University College in 1943.

== Career ==
Bernström began his career as an attaché at the Ministry for Foreign Affairs in 1944, with postings in Madrid in 1945, Paris in 1947, Moscow in 1948, and Washington, D.C. later that year, where he became an embassy secretary in 1949. He was appointed as second secretary at the Ministry in 1951 and was promoted to first secretary in 1953. In 1957, he became first legation secretary in Rio de Janeiro, later serving as chargé d'affaires ad interim in Bogotá in 1957 and in Rio de Janeiro in 1958. He also chaired trade negotiations with Japan, the Soviet Union, and other countries between 1959 and 1963, and again from 1968 to 1970.

From 1959 to 1963, he served as director (byråchef) at the Ministry. In 1963, he was appointed envoy to Caracas, with additional accreditation to Port-au-Prince and Santo Domingo from 1964 to 1966. He also chaired Scandinavian aviation negotiations with Japan and the Soviet Union from 1966 to 1970. That year, he worked with the Ministry's negotiation group and later led the trade department until 1970. After a period on reserve in 1971, he served as vice chairman of the Swedish delegation at the United Nations Trade Conference in Santiago in 1972. He was then appointed ambassador to Madrid from 1973 to 1976 and to Rabat from 1976 to 1983, with concurrent accreditation to Banjul, Dakar, and Nouakchott from 1977 to 1983.

== Personal life ==
On his own initiative, he went into pension in 1983, converted to Islam in 1986 and took the name Mohammed.

== Bibliography ==
- Koranens budskap: med kommentarer och noter. Svenska islamiska akademiens skriftserie, 1651-2847; 1 (in Swedish). Translated by Bernström, Mohammed Knut. Stockholm: Proprius. 2002. ISBN 9171188991. SELIBR 8429342.
- Asad, Muhammad, ed. (2000). Koranens budskap (in Swedish). Translated by Bernström, Mohammed Knut (2nd ed.). Stockholm: Proprius. ISBN 9171188878. SELIBR 8370454.

Diplomatic posts
Preceded by Gunnar Dryselius	Ambassador of Sweden to Venezuela; 1963–1966	Succeeded by Otto Rathsman
Preceded by Gunnar Dryselius	Ambassador of Sweden to Haiti; 1963–1966	Succeeded by Hans Ewerlöf
Preceded by Gunnar Dryselius	Ambassador of Sweden to Dominican Republic; 1963–1966	Succeeded by Otto Rathsman
Preceded by Jan Stenström	Ambassador of Sweden to Spain; 1973–1976	Succeeded by Lennart Petri
Preceded by Åke Sjölin	Ambassador of Sweden to Morocco; 1976–1983	Succeeded by Arne Lundquist
Preceded by Åke Sjölin	Ambassador of Sweden to the Gambia; 1977–1983	Succeeded by Erik Cornell
Preceded by Åke Sjölin	Ambassador of Sweden to Mauritania; 1977–1983	Succeeded by Erik Cornell
Preceded by Åke Sjölin	Ambassador of Sweden to Senegal; 1977–1983	Succeeded by Erik Cornell
