= Magnus Faxén =

Swedish journalist, diplomat, and TV executive (1930–2018)

- Born: Jonas Magnus Faxén; 21 November 1930; Uppsala, Sweden
- Died: 29 March 2018 (aged 87)
- Occupations: Journalist, diplomat
- Years active: 1951–1995
- Spouse: Marianne Ek (m. 1957; died 2011)
- Children: 1

Jonas Magnus Faxén (21 November 1930 – 29 March 2018) was a Swedish journalist, diplomat and TV executive. He was Sveriges Television's (SVT) first CEO from 1978 to 1981 and served as Swedish consul general to New York City from 1988 to 1992. Faxén was Swedish ambassador in Tunis and a number of West African countries during the 1990s.

== Early life ==
Faxén was born on 21 November 1930 in Uppsala, Sweden, the son of Lars Faxén, a lector, and his wife Nina (née Stjernfelt). He had his very first journalism job in the 1940s when, for a few summers, he had a temporary work at the Dalpilen newspaper in Falun. He passed studentexamen in 1949 and studied in Uppsala and Stockholm.

== Career ==
Faxén was employed by Svenska Dagbladet from 1951 to 1953 and by Norrlandsposten in Gävle in 1953 and in 1955. He was employed by AB Radiotjänst in 1956 (which became Sveriges Radio in 1957) and worked as a program producer from 1959. Faxén made a large number of reporting trips to Africa for Sveriges Radio. Around 1960, Faxén came to Dagens Eko and its foreign editorial staff. He reported from Congo, where he met, among others, Congo's first president, Patrice Lumumba. While delivering his phone reports from Congo's capital Léopoldville, his wife Marianne gave birth to the couple's first child back in Sweden. The chief of Dagens Eko, Per Persson, thought it was crazy that he would have to stay in Congo when he had just become a father and was therefore sent home to Sweden. He was back in Congo at the end of 1961 and witnessed from his hotel room how Swedish fighter aircraft under UN flags attacked the post office in Élisabethville.

Faxén also reported on the liberation of Algeria, including the Algiers putsch in which French generals tried to take power over what was then a large French province in North Africa. He was Sveriges Radio's Paris correspondent from 1963 to 1966 and foreign affairs commentator from 1966. He went from radio to television in 1969. Sweden's second TV channel, TV2, was to be started and so was a new news program, Rapport, which was broadcast for the first time on 5 December 1969. Even during his time at Rapport, Faxén traveled extensively. Among other things, he covered the civil war in Jordan, the Black September in 1970. Faxén was then correspondent in Washington, D.C. from 1971 to 1973 where, in addition to covering the 1972 presidential election, he also had to report on the first incidents in the Watergate scandal, which later led to the resignation of President Nixon. Back in Sweden, he was then managing editor of TV2's factual television editorial office from 1973 to 1974. Faxén was then radio program manager from 1974.

On 1 July 1978, Sveriges Radio was reorganized into four broadcasting companies under one parent company. Faxén reluctantly accepted the position of CEO of Sveriges Television (SVT) from the radio chief Otto Nordenskiöld. During its first three years as an independent company, SVT had a slightly reluctant CEO who struggled with willful TV channel management and a sometimes partially unsympathetic board of directors. All at a time when new challenges such as competition from satellite TV, cable TV, home video devices and other things started to emerge. In the spring of 1981, Faxén had had enough and in connection with a conference in Ronneby, he announced to SVT's first chairman Lennart Sandgren that he did not want to extend his three-year contract as CEO. Shortly afterwards he received a call from the then Foreign Minister Ola Ullsten, who wondered if Faxén wanted to become a press officer at the Ministry for Foreign Affairs. He accepted and became deputy director-general (departementsråd) and was head of the Ministry for Foreign Affairs' press and information unit from 1981 to 1983. In 1984, he was appointed consul general to New York City.

Faxén was then ambassador in Tunis from 1988 to 1992 where he several times met with PLO leader Yasser Arafat. Faxén then had special assignments at the Ministry for Foreign Affairs with a position as ambassador from 1992, including West Africa (Niamey and Dakar from 1992, Conakry and Nouakchott from 1993 and Bamako from 1994). He retired in 1995.

== Personal life ==
In 1957, he married Marianne Ek (1933–2011), the daughter of Gunnar Ek and Margareta (née Eriksson). They one child: Karin (born 1960).

== Death ==
Faxén died on 29 March 2018 and the funeral was held in Lidingö Church on 24 April 2018. He was buried in Lidingö Cemetery on 11 July 2018.

Media offices
Preceded by Position Established	Chief executive officer of Sveriges Television; 1 July 1978 – 24 September 1981	Succeeded by Sam Nilsson
Diplomatic posts
Preceded by Bengt Friedman	Consul General of Sweden to New York City; 1984–1988	Succeeded by Arne Thorén
Preceded by Anders Sandström	Ambassador of Sweden to Tunisia; 1988–1992	Succeeded by John Hagard
Preceded by Bengt Holmquist	Ambassador of Sweden to Niger; 1992–1995	Succeeded by Nils-Erik Schyberg
Preceded by Bengt Holmquist	Ambassador of Sweden to Senegal; 1992–1995	Succeeded by Nils-Erik Schyberg
Preceded by Bengt Holmquist	Ambassador of Sweden to Guinea; 1993–1995	Succeeded by Carl-Erhard Lindahl
Preceded by Bengt Holmquist	Ambassador of Sweden to Mauritania; 1993–1995	Succeeded by Cecilia Malmsten
Preceded by Bengt Holmquist	Ambassador of Sweden to Mali; 1994–1995	Succeeded by Nils-Erik Schyberg
