= List of ambassadors of Sweden to Morocco =

Ambassador of Sweden to Morocco
- Lesser coat of arms of the Kingdom of Sweden
- Incumbent; Fredrika Ornbrant since September 2025
- Ministry for Foreign Affairs; Swedish Embassy, Rabat
- Style: His or Her Excellency (formal); Mr. or Madam Ambassador (informal)
- Reports to: Minister for Foreign Affairs
- Residence: 69 Avenue Jaafar Essadik, Agdal (Note: Also spelled 69 Zankat Jafar As-Saddiq.)
- Seat: Rabat, Morocco
- Appointer: Government of Sweden
- Term length: No fixed term
- Inaugural holder: Lennart Petri
- Formation: 1958
- Website: Swedish Embassy, Rabat

The Ambassador of Sweden to Morocco (known formally as the Ambassador of the Kingdom of Sweden to the Kingdom of Morocco) is the official representative of the government of Sweden to the king of Morocco and cabinet of Morocco.

== History ==
In June 1956, Sweden officially recognized Morocco as an independent state. The Swedish consulate in Casablanca had established relations with the Moroccan authorities, signifying Sweden's recognition of Morocco.

On July 23, 1958, Lennart Petri, Sweden's first minister to Morocco, presented his credentials to King Mohammed V. In July 1959, an agreement was reached between the Swedish and Moroccan governments on the mutual elevation of the respective countries' legations to embassies. The diplomatic rank was thereafter changed to ambassador instead of envoy extraordinary and minister plenipotentiary.

The ambassador has also been accredited in neighboring countries on various occasions: Tunisia (1958–1960), Libya (1960–1962), Senegal (1963–1983), The Gambia (1968–1983), and Mauritania (1970–1983, 1996–2004).

== List of representatives ==
Name	Period	Title	Notes	Ref
Lennart Petri	1958 – July 1959	Envoy	Also accredited to Tunis.	
Lennart Petri	July 1959 – 1962	Ambassador	Also accredited to Tunis and Tripoli (from 1960).	
Bo Siegbahn	1963–1966	Ambassador	Also accredited to Dakar.	
Lars von Celsing	1967–1972	Ambassador	Also accredited to Banjul (from 1968), Dakar (from 1967), and Nouakchott (from 1970).	
Åke Sjölin	1972–1976	Ambassador	Also accredited to Banjul, Dakar, and Nouakchott.	
Knut Bernström	1976–1983	Ambassador	Also accredited to Banjul, Dakar, and Nouakchott (all from 1977).	
Arne Lundquist	1983–1987	Ambassador		
Rune Nyström	1987–1990	Ambassador		
Christer Jacobson	1990–1994	Ambassador		
Mathias Mossberg	1994–1996	Ambassador		
Cecilia Malmsten	1996–2000	Ambassador	Also accredited to Nouakchott.	
Peter Bruce	2000–2004	Ambassador	Also accredited to Nouakchott (from 2001).	
Klas Gierow	2004–2008	Ambassador		
Michael Odevall	2008–2011	Ambassador		
Anna Hammargren	2011–2015	Ambassador		
Erika Ferrer	2015–2018	Ambassador		
Niklas Kebbon	1 September 2018 – 2020	Ambassador		
Anne Höglund	September 2020 – 2022	Ambassador		
Jörgen Karlsson	September 2022 – 2025	Ambassador		
Fredrika Ornbrant	2025–present	Ambassador		
