= Foreign aid to Mali =

Mali is heavily dependent upon foreign aid and is a major recipient of both multilateral and bilateral aid.

== Aid donors ==
Multilateral donors include the International Monetary Fund, World Bank, African Development Bank, Arab Funds, and European Union. Bilateral donors include France, the United States, Canada, the Netherlands, the People's Republic of China, India, and Germany.

== Extent of aid ==
Foreign aid was estimated at US$596.4 million in 2001. In 2003 U.S. aid totaled US$44.2 million. As economic reforms progress, the government is hoping to move from budgetary and balance of payments assistance to social development aid. India extended an aid of $100 million in 2012 to set up power and other social infrastructure in the country.
