= Folke Bernadotte Academy =

Swedish government agency

- Folke Bernadotteakademin

Government agency overview
- Formed: 2002; 23 years ago
- Jurisdiction: Kramfors, Västernorrland County
- Government agency executive: Per Olsson Fridh, Director general
- Parent department: Ministry for Foreign Affairs
- Agency ID: 202100-5380

The Folke Bernadotte Academy (FBA) (Swedish: Folke Bernadotteakademin) is the Swedish government agency for peace, security and development. FBA conducts training, research and method development in order to strengthen peacebuilding and statebuilding in conflict and post-conflict countries. The agency also recruits civilian personnel and expertise for peace operations and election observation missions led by the EU, UN and OSCE. The agency is named after Count Folke Bernadotte, the first UN mediator.

FBA is under the authority of the Swedish Ministry of Foreign Affairs. The agency was established in 2002 and has two offices; in Stockholm and at Sandö in Sweden. Apart from the somewhat 100 employees at the two offices, FBA has about 80 deployed employees around the world. The General-Director of FBA since 2012 is Sven-Eric Söder.

FBA works with various parts of the peace process:

- Disarmament, demobilization and reintegration of ex-combatants
- Conflict prevention and conflict resolution
- Women, peace and security
- Leadership and political affairs
- Rule of law, human rights and election support
- Security sector reform
- Cooperation in peace operations
- Security in the field

FBA is part of Sweden's development aid within the field of peace and security. The agency is commissioned by the Swedish government to work with the Swedish development cooperation strategies with a number of conflict affected countries and regions.

Moreover, FBA administers two Swedish government grants. The Peace Million, that finances projects that focus on peace and security, and the so called 1325 Grants for organizations working with issues concerning women, peace and security.

FBA also manages The Peace Archive, a digital archive with documentation of Sweden’s contribution to international peace operations. In addition, the international secretariat of Challenges Forum is hosted by the FBA. Challenges Forum is a worldwide network of organizations dedicated to strengthening UN peace operations.
