= Össjö =

Town in Ängelholm Municipality, Sweden

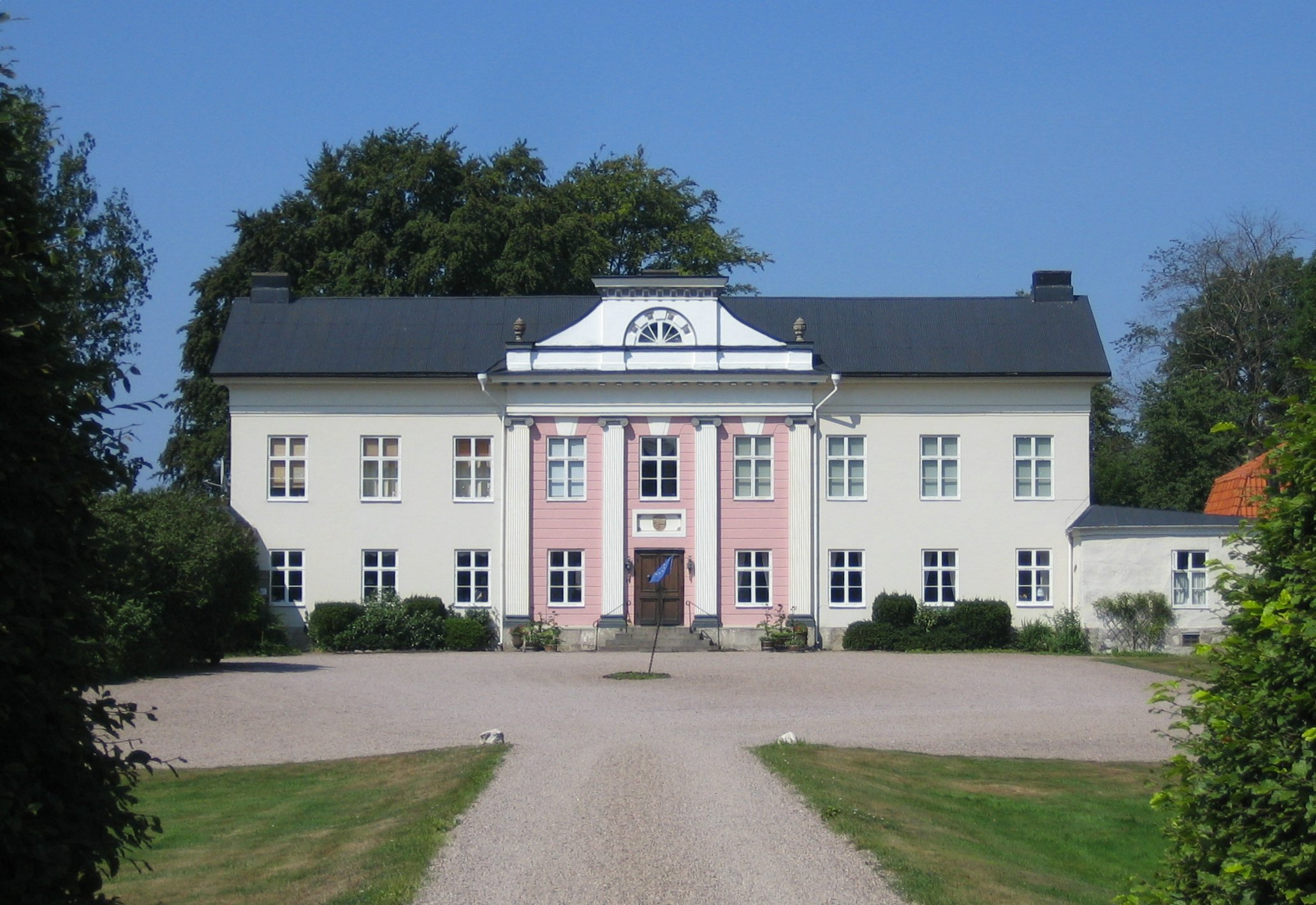
- Össjö Gård

- Location within Skåne Location within Sweden
- Coordinates: 56°14′20″N 13°02′30″E
- Country: Sweden
- Province: Skåne
- County: Skåne County
- Municipality: Ängelholm Municipality
- Time zone: UTC+1 (CET)
  - Summer (DST): UTC+2 (CEST)

Össjö (Swedish pronunciation: [ˈœ̌ɧːœ]; formerly Åsbo-Össjö) is a small town in the Ängelholm Municipality of Skåne County in Sweden. As of 2005 it had a recorded population of 192 and an area of 26 hectares.

The town is the birthplace of musician Marie Fredriksson of the band Roxette.

Össjö Gård, an estate, is located in Össjö. It was built in the years 1814-1815 by Adolf Fredrik Tornérhjelm.

Other notable buildings include the railway station (built in 1904 by the Ängelholm Klippan railway, closed in 1953), and a church which lies at the center of the town.
