= Embassy of Sweden, Algiers =

- Location: Algiers
- Address: Visiting address: Rue Olof Palme; Nouveau-Paradou; Hydra-Alger; Postal address: Ambassade de Suède; B.P 263; 160 35 Hydra-Alger
- Coordinates: 36.74494°N 3.02932°E
- Opened: 1963
- Ambassador: Anna Block Mazoyer
- Jurisdiction: Algeria
- Website: Official website

The Embassy of Sweden in Algiers is Sweden's diplomatic mission in Algeria. The first Swedish ambassador was accredited to Algiers in 1963. The ambassador since 2021 is Björn Häggmark.

== History ==
Sweden has had relations with Algeria since 1727 and the first Swedish consulate was established in 1729. The first bilateral agreement between Sweden and Algeria was signed in 1729.

Through letters patent on 6 October 1857, the consulate was changed to a consulate general. Previously, consuls typically held the personal title of consul general. By letters patent on 17 August 1877, the designation reverted to consulate; on 4 February 1887, the holder was granted the title of consul general, and through a decision on 12 March 1897, the consulate title was once again confirmed in connection with a changed district division. The consulate area, which previously included Algiers, had indeed been expanded on 8 December 1882, with the district of the consulate in Tunis, which was then withdrawn, but on 12 March 1897, it was restricted to the French possessions in Algiers, after the latter consulate had been reestablished.

On the occasion of the proclamation of Algeria's independence on 3 July 1962, Sweden's Minister for Foreign Affairs, Östen Undén, stated in a telegram to the chairman of the provisional Algerian executive government, Abderrahmane Farès, that the Swedish government recognized Algeria as a sovereign and independent state. After Algeria's independence on 5 July 1962, a proposal for a new mission in Algiers was approved in the so-called Swedish Ministry for Foreign Affairs investigation in December of the same year. In February 1963, it was reported that Consul Anders Forsse, on loan from the Swedish embassy in Paris and residing at the Hôtel Saint-George in Algiers, was busy finding a house for the future ambassador and his assistants to live and work in. In April 1963, an agreement was reached between Sweden and Algeria to establish diplomatic relations at ambassadorial level between the two countries. Bengt Rabaeus, the embassy counselor at the Swedish embassy in Paris, was appointed as ambassador in Algiers.

The embassy was subordinate to the consulate until 1968. From 1968 to 1980, the Swedish ambassador was also accredited to Bamako, Mali.

In September 1994, the Swedish embassy staff was moved from Algiers to Paris due to the Algerian Civil War and the threats against foreigners. The embassy was still open with local employees. In January 1995, it was reported that the Swedish embassy was still open but manned by two local Algerians.

Since 2012, Sweden and Poland have shared embassies. The Polish embassy in Algiers represents Sweden for the application for a Schengen visa. The Swedish embassy has no visa operations.

== Staff and tasks ==
As of June 2024, nine people work at the embassy, of which three are dispatched from the Ministry for Foreign Affairs, and six are locally employed. The embassy has two sections: the Section for Politics, Economy, Promotion, and Communication, and the Section for Administration, Migration, and Consular Affairs.

== Buildings ==
=== Chancery ===
In 1964, the chancery was located at the address 4 Boulevard Mohammed V, Algiers. In February 1983, it was reported that the embassy faced urgent facility issues. The chancery was housed in a building without security measures, deemed fire hazardous, and the lease was terminated. A new location had to be ready within a year. Ambassador Jean-Christophe Öberg proposed using the ferry Wasa Star, which was laid up in the Port of Sundsvall, as chancery simultaneously while addressing the issues with the problematic ferry.

The current chancery is located in the district of Hydra, 5 kilometres south of the capital Algiers city centre. The embassy plot and the neighbouring plot, where the ambassadorial residence is located, were acquired by the Swedish state in 1958. However, the sketch work for the chancery did not begin until 1983. The chancery was designed by Bo Myrenberg, Myrenbergs Arkitektkontor and was built by Skanska. The years 1985–1988 (during which time the current office was built) the address was B.P. 23, Place Allende, 16300 Bir Mourad Raïs, Algiers. Since 1989 the address is B.P. 263, DZ-16035 Hydra/Alger.

The plot is located in hilly terrain with large level differences. This has affected the layout of the office building, which has offices on two floors. The entrance faces the street while the staff housing is on the third floor. On the ground floor is the main entrance with waiting room and reception. The offices are mainly located on the second floor with a dozen service rooms, a meeting room and a lunchroom. The building is cast in solid concrete. The floors are covered with cement mosaic, while doors and cabinet interiors are made of Swedish beech, which gives the interior a blond Nordic touch. The garden's plants are specially selected to provide a rich spectrum of greenery and for them to bloom in all seasons.

Over the years, the needs of the operations have changed and for the current operations, the Ministry of Foreign Affairs' space requirements have been halved. The former ambassador Eva Emneus was instrumental in establishing contact with the Polish delegation locally, which led to a rebuild being carried out in 2011, so that the Polish embassy could move in and divide the premises. The program document was prepared by GRAD architects. BAU architects designed the construction document as general consultant together with Tyréns, POAB, Electro Engineering and Brandkonsulten. The contract was carried out by Bygg & Marinteknik. The conversion involved a joint reception, where Sweden and Poland coexist behind the same counter. The embassies of the two countries also have a common entrance, kitchen and dining room, conference rooms, parking spaces and parts of the garden around the office. With the words "We are proud of our long cooperation with Algeria and sharing our embassy with Poland", State Secretary for Foreign Affairs Frank Belfrage inaugurated the joint embassy in Algiers on 27 March 2012.

=== Residence ===
In 1964, the residence was located at the address Villa Les Erbrives, Rue No 5, Parc le Paradou, Hydra-Algiers. In 1965, the residence was located at the address Villa Trois Couronnes, Rue No 5, Parc le Paradou, Hydra-Algiers.

The plot where the residence is located today and the neighboring plot where the embassy building is located were acquired by the Swedish state in 1958. The ambassadorial residence was built in the late 1950s and was completed in 1960. It is a modern French-style villa that feels Nordic and decorated with furniture by Josef Frank. The residence was designed by Henry Guibout.
