= Bengt Rabaeus =

Swedish diplomat

- Born: 4 May 1917; Vara, Sweden
- Died: 31 July 2010 (aged 93); Lidingö, Sweden
- Education: Uppsala University
- Occupation: Diplomat
- Years active: 1946–1989
- Spouse: Birgitta Svenson (m. 1946; died 1987)
- Children: 3, including Johan Rabaeus

Bengt Rabaeus (4 May 1917 – 31 July 2010) was a Swedish diplomat.

== Early life ==
Rabaeus was born on 4 May 1917 in Vara, Sweden, the son of the senior teacher David Ohlson and his wife Ingegärd (née Bengtson). He passed his studentexamen from Katedralskolan in Skara in 1937 and took a reserve officer exam in 1940. Rabaeus received a Master of Philosophy degree from Uppsala University in 1946 and became attaché at the Ministry for Foreign Affairs in 1946.

== Career ==
He served in Prague from 1946 to 1949 and in Paris from 1949 to 1950. Rabaeus was a civil law notary in the Committee on Foreign Affairs from 1951 to 1955, second secretary at the Foreign Ministry in 1952, secretary of the committee for the revision of the General Agreement on Tariffs and Trade agreement from 1954 to 1955 and was first embassy secretary of Permanent Representative of Sweden to the United Nations in New York City in 1955. Rabeus was embassy counsellor in Paris while serving in the Organisation for European Economic Co-operation delegation from 1957 to 1959. He was director at the Foreign Ministry from 1959 to 1961, embassy counsellor in Paris from 1961 to 1963 and ambassador in Algiers from 1963 to 1966.

He was deputy secretary general of the European Free Trade Association from 1966 and the secretary general from 1972 to 1975. Rabaeus was then deputy state secretary for foreign affairs at the Ministry for Foreign Affairs from 1975 to 1978 and Permanent Representative of Sweden to the European Communities in Brussels from 1978 to 1983. He was chairman of Skara Deacons Association (Skaradjäknarnas förening) from 1977 to 1985, deputy chairman of the Swedish Pulp and Paper Mills Association (Svenska cellulosa- och pappersbruksföreningen) from 1983 and chairman of the Swedish Forest Industries Federation (Skogsindustrierna) from 1984 to 1989.

== Personal life ==
In 1946 Rabaeus married Birgitta Svenson (1919–1987), daughter of the director Arvid Svenson and his wife. He is the father of the actor Johan Rabaeus (born 1947), Michael (born 1951), and Henrik (born 1954).

== Awards and decorations ==
- (Portugal) Grand Cross of the Order of Prince Henry (11 December 1990)
- (France) Officer of the Order of the Black Star
- Knight, First Class of the Order of the Lion of Finland

Diplomatic posts
Preceded by None	Ambassador of Sweden to Algeria; 1963–1966	Succeeded by Wilhelm Wachtmeister
Preceded by John Coulson	Secretary General of the European Free Trade Association; 1972–1975	Succeeded by Charles Müller
Preceded by Carl De Geer	Deputy State Secretary for Foreign Affairs; 1975–1978	Succeeded by Carl-George Crafoord
Preceded by Erik von Sydow	Permanent Representative of Sweden to the European Communities; 1978–1983	Succeeded by Stig Brattström
