= Everöd Church =

- Everöds kyrka
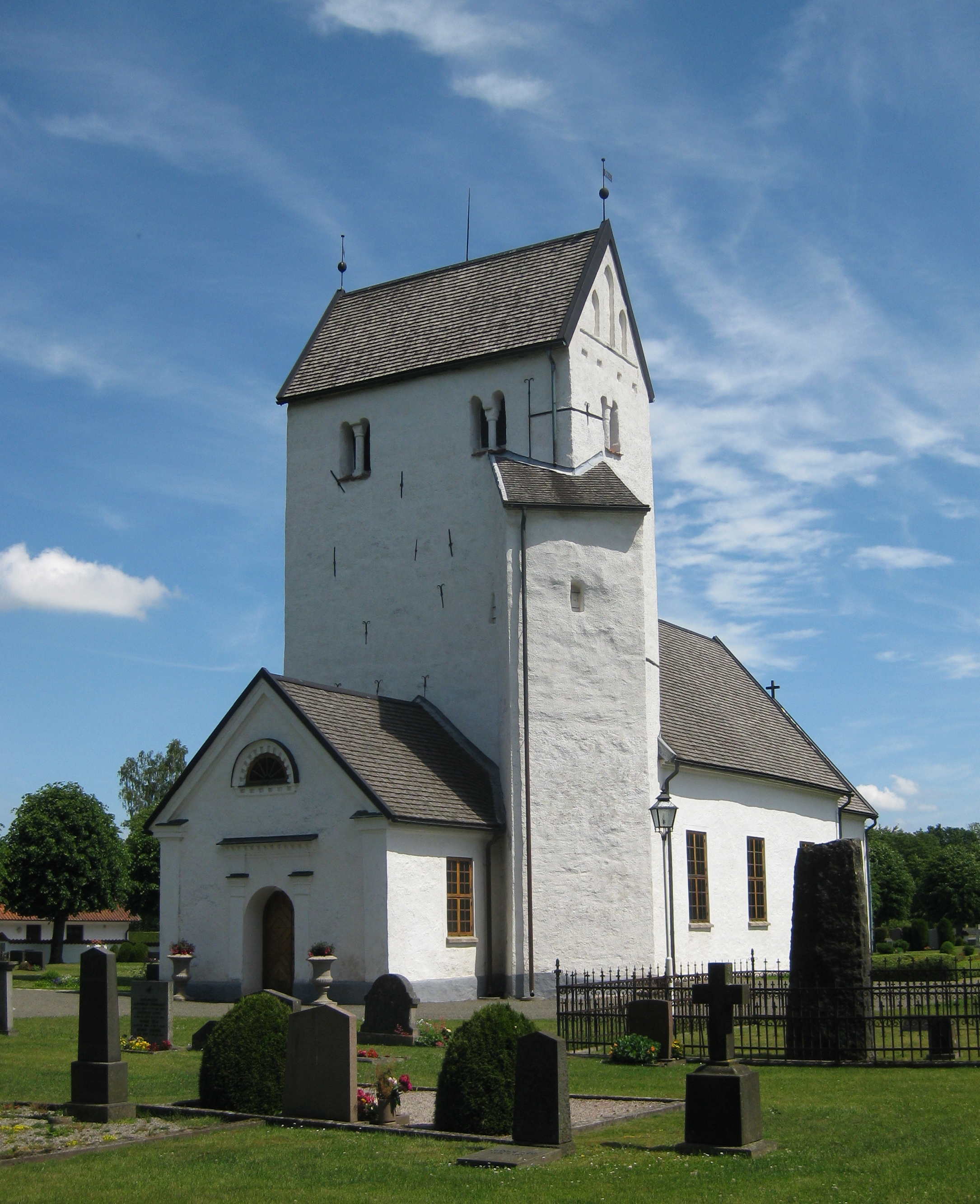
- Everöd Church

- 55°54′05″N 14°04′22″E
- Country: Sweden
- Denomination: Church of Sweden

Everöd Church (Swedish: Everöds kyrka) is a medieval Lutheran church in Everöd in the province of Scania, Sweden. It belongs to the parish of Degeberga-Everöds in the Diocese of Lund.

== History and architecture ==
The church was built at the end of the 12th century in a Romanesque style. The oldest parts are the tower, nave and choir with apse. During the late Middle Ages a buttress was added to support the tower. During the second and third quarters of the 15th century the interior of the church was also vaulted. In the process, a set of Romanesque murals were obstructed, so that half of the murals are visible above the vaulting.

The church was expanded during the 1770s with an addition to its northern side. A new church porch and entrance was added to the western side of the tower in 1837. The church contains murals from three different periods: the first half of the 13th century, the 1770s and the late 19th century.
