= Everöd =

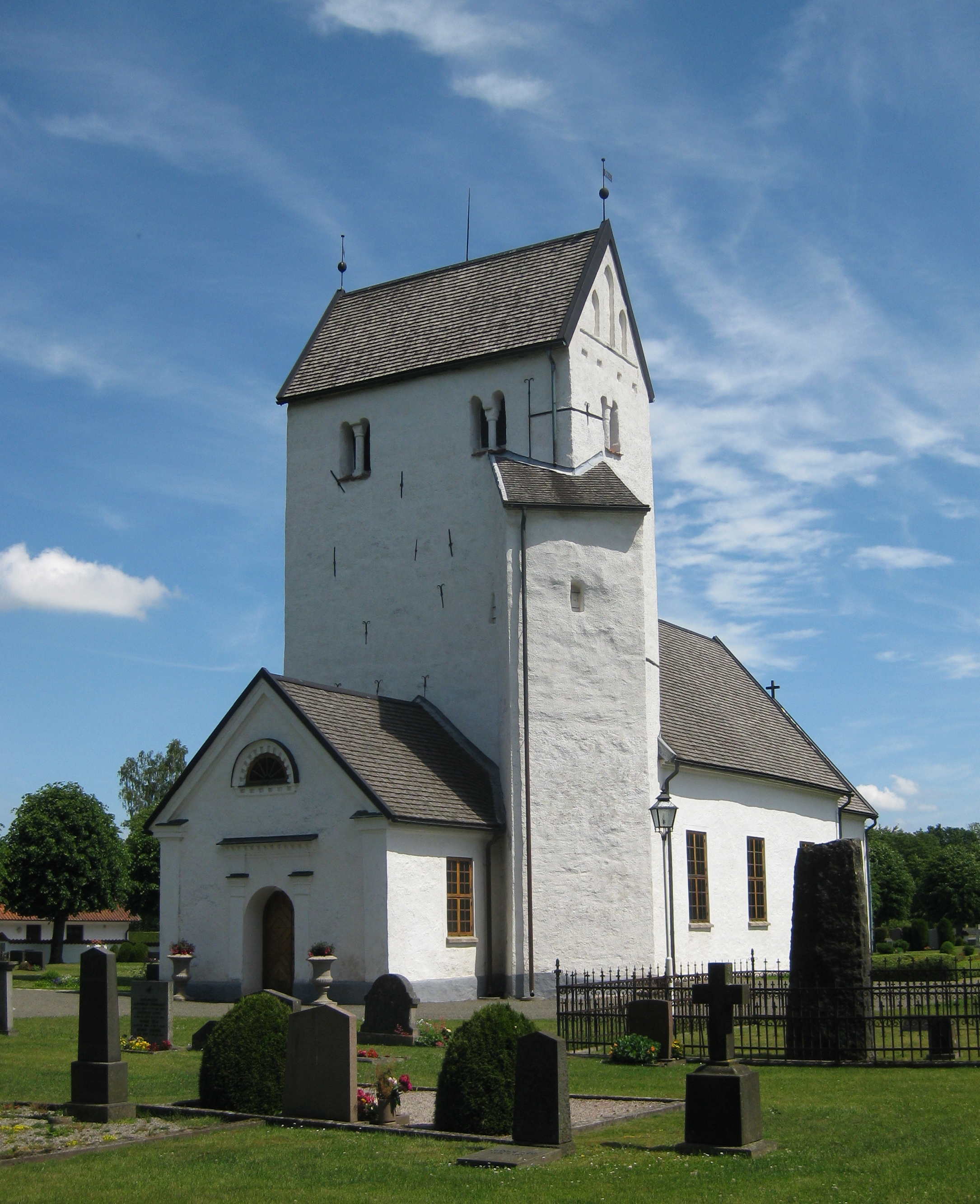
- Everöd Church

- Location within Skåne Location within Sweden
- Coordinates: 55°54′N 14°06′E
- Country: Sweden
- Province: Skåne
- County: Skåne County
- Municipality: Kristianstad Municipality

Area
  - Total: 1.24 km^{2} (0.48 sq mi)

Population (31 December 2010)
  - Total: 885
  - Density: 712/km^{2} (1,840/sq mi)
- Time zone: UTC+1 (CET)
  - Summer (DST): UTC+2 (CEST)

Everöd is a locality situated in Kristianstad Municipality, Skåne County, Sweden with 885 inhabitants in 2010.

Kristianstad Airport, which is sometimes referred to as "Everöd Airport" by locals, is located close to Everöd. The Romanesque Everöd Church is located in Everöd.
