= Katedralskolan, Skara =

School in Skara, Sweden

Coordinates: 58°23′23.20″N 13°27′10.60″E

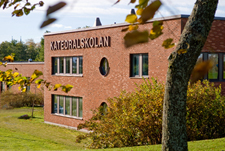

Katedralskolan (Meaning "Cathedral School") in Skara is one of Sweden's oldest Upper Secondary Schools. It was founded in 1641 at the initiative of the Diocese of Skara, and its bishop Jonas Magni Wexionensis, and was approved by Queen Christina on August 31 of the same year. For hundreds of years before that it had been a priest training school which was founded in the 13th century and the students were called Skaradjäknar ("Skara Deacons").

In June 1864 first student group took the final exam in Skara. Earlier the exam had been taken at a university. In 1878 came the name Higher general secondary school, which remained until 1965. The school opened for girls in 1927.

The school had long been located in a building east of Skara Cathedral Choir by the then-high wall surrounding the cathedral churchyard. The building was demolished in the late 19th century, when the neo-Gothic building with a typical lecture hall was built south of the cathedral. In 1972, the current main building, which is more on the edge of Skara, was finished, and the school moved. The former high school building is now an elementary school for grades 7-9 called Djäkneskolan ("Diacon School") whose students likewise are called Djäknar ("Deacons")

The school has had, during its time, many students who have later become famous, poet Johan Henrik Kellgren, chemist Torbern Bergman and the Swedish veterinary medicine's father Peter Hernqvist to name a few. The school's motto is "Där tradition och framtid möts" ("Where tradition and the future meet").

== Programs ==
The school offers most of the programs available at this level in Sweden:

Barn- och fritidsprogrammet ("The youth and leisure program"), with the specialization socialt arbete ("social working").
Bygg- och anläggningsprogrammet ("The building and facility program"), with the specializations byggnadsplåt ("building sheet") and husbyggnad ("house building").
Ekonomiprogrammet ("The economy program"), with the specialization ekonomi ("economy"). Beginning autumn of 2011.
El- och energiprogrammet ("The electricity and energy-program"), with the specialization elteknik ("electricity technology").
Estetiska programmet ("The aesthetic program"), with the specializations dans ("dance"), Musik - MoP Music and Productions ("Music - Music and Production" - see below) and teater ("theater").
Fordons- och transportprogrammet ("The vehicle and transportation program"), with specializations Lastbil och mobila maskiner ("Truck(s) and mobile machines"), personbil ("private cars"), and transport.
Gymnasiesärskolan ("The gymnasial learning support unit").
Handel och service ("Trave and service"), beginning autumn 2011.
Mediaprogrammet ("The media program") until autumn 2011.
Naturvetenskapsprogrammet ("The natural science program"), with the specialization naturvetenskap ("natural science").
Omvårdnad Lärling ("Healthcare Apprentice").
Restaurang- och livsmedelsprogrammet ("The restaurant and food program"), with the specializations bageri och konditori ("bakery and patissere").
Samhällsvetenskapsprogrammet ("The social science program"), with the specializations samhällsvetenskap ("social science") (further divided into samhällsvetenskap and journalistik ("journalistic"), språk ("language") and ekonomi ("economy") for students that began their studies before 1 July 2011, and for later students samhällsvetenskap and medier, information och kommunikation ("media, information and communication")
Teknikprogrammet ("The technology program"), with the specialization design och produktutveckling ("design and product development")
Vård- och omsorgsprogrammet ("The healthcare and welfare program").

Cathedral School also offers the international education International Baccalaureate (IB)

== Double Quartet, Friends of Music and Octo Puellae ==
When Gunnar Wennerberg was a student at Cathedral School, he co-founded the chorus, double quartet (DQ). When Wennerberg became philosophy lecturer at the school in 1886, he co-founded the choir music's Friends (MV). Both of these choirs are still active at Cathedral School, and have become a traditional feature of Skara's culture. MV and DQ provides, inter alia, continuous concerts in the Botanical Garden in Skara in May, they provide an Advent concert in the cathedral and sing for the bishop in a traditional courtship. In 1977 a choir of female students was formed, called Octo Puellae (OP) which now is an equal key element of the school's music scene. The choirs are also important for Cathedral School's graduation ceremony

== Skara Deacon Association ==
The Skara Deacon Association (SDA) is an association for those who have been pupils at the school. The association, founded in 1916, has approximately 1650 members. SDA has departments with various activities at four locations: Stockholm, Gothenburg, Malmö and Skara.

The purpose of SDA is to preserve and enhance the sense of community with those who, through the years, have gone through secondary school education in Skara. The term "Deacon" is now used primarily for students at traditional high schools like the Cathedral School in Skara and Uppsala.

== Notable students ==
- Torbern Bergman
- Johannes Edfelt
- Johan Henrik Kellgren
- Ernst Killander
- Linda Sundblad
- Gunnar Wennerberg
