= Treaty between Algiers and Sweden (1729) =

Sweden Algeria Treaty Peace

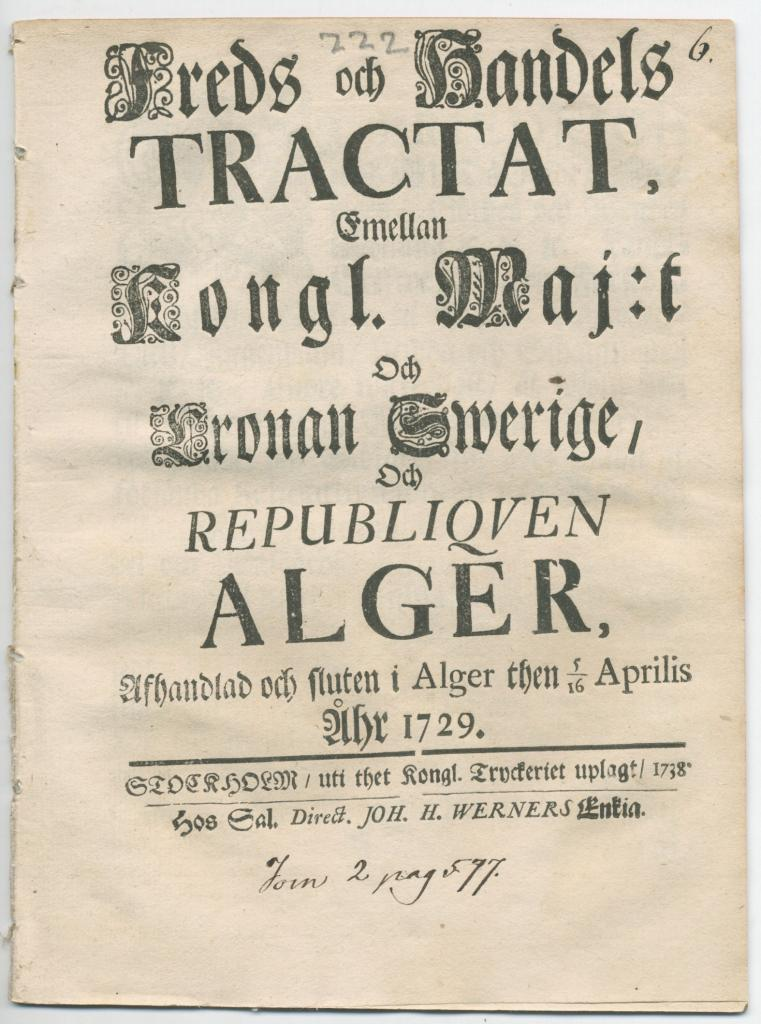
The treaty between Sweden and Algiers

Treaty between Algiers and Sweden (1729) was the first treaty between Sweden and the Regency of Algiers dealt with the treatment of Swedish captives in Algeria, and tribute payments in return for special passes for Swedish merchant ships that granted them immunity from attack in the Mediterranean Sea.

In 1729, Sweden offered to sign a peace treaty with the Regency of Algiers in order to end the latter's attacks on Swedish merchant ships. Sweden began paying taxes to Algiers and Algiers obtained a new financier for its fleet with marine construction materials and Sweden joined the countries paying taxes to Sweden also established a consulate in Algiers, Sweden's first in the Islamic world.

George Logie, a Scottish resident in Algiers, arranged the treaty and acted as the head negotiator As the first Swedish consul in Algiers, he wrote in an October 13, 1738 letter to the Swedish Chamber of Commerce: "I can find no other way in which Algiers will be more useful to Sweden than by keeping the peace with it. Peace with Algiers gives our ships the freedom to sail safely to the Spanish and Portuguese shores as well as the rest of the Mediterranean ports"

== Stipulations ==
- No Swedish captives should be harmed or tortured.
- No Swedish subject should be enslaved.
- If a slave flees to a Swedish warship, that slave should be taken back.
- No Swedish subject should be forced to ransom a slave, nor can the slave's owner be forced to sell against his will.

== Results ==
As a reward for his success, George Logie became the first consul for Sweden in Algeria and went on to sign treaties with Tunis, Tripoli, and Morocco.
