= Bengt Lindqvist =

Swedish politician and activist

member of the Riksdag
- In office 1982–1995

United Nations Special Rapporteur on Disability
- In office 1994–2002

Personal details
- Born: 3 June 1936 Helsingborg, Sweden
- Died: 3 December 2016 (aged 80)
- Party: Social Democratic Party
- Known for: advocacy for persons with disabilities

Bengt Olof Lennart Lindqvist (3 June 1936 – 3 December 2016) was a Swedish politician and advocate of persons with disabilities.

Born in Helsingborg in 1936, he was a member of the Social Democratic Party and served as chairman of the Swedish Association of the Visually Impaired (Synskadades riksförbund) from 1975 to 1985, the rehabilitation committee of the World Council for the Welfare of the Blind from 1974 to 1985, and the Swedish Disability Association (Handikappförbundens centralkomité, HCK) from 1977 to 1985. First elected as a Member of the Riksdag (MP) for Stockholm County in 1982, he stepped down in 1995. Lindqvist also served as a deputy minister for social security (responsible for family affairs, elderly care and disability) in the Palme II and Carlsson I Cabinet and was later named minister without portfolio with the same responsibilities in the Carlsson II Cabinet.

From 1994 to 2002, Bengt Lindqvist served as the United Nations Special Rapporteur on Disability of the Commission for Social Development.

He died at the age of 80 in 2016.

== Biography ==
=== Family ===
Born in Helsingborg, Lindqvist was the third child of Wiking Lindqvist, a pipe installer, and his wife Westa Jönsson, a shop assistant for a chemical business. He grew up with two older sisters. He married Gun Bengtsson in 1960 and moved with her to Solna in Stockholm County. The couple had two daughters. In 1966, the family moved into a larger apartment in Tyresö and in 1970 into a house in Trollbäcken. Lindqvist died in Nynäshamn on 3 December 2016, leaving behind his wife, his two daughters, and four grandchildren.

=== Education ===
While attending Husensjö primary school in Helsingborg, Lindqvist was diagnosed with poor eyesight during a routine check at the age of eight, which was later specified by the university hospital in Lund as a degeneration of the retinal pigment, eventually causing blindness. Though Lindqvist continued to attend public school, his visual impairment affected his education and after several years rendered it impossible to read standard printed text. As aiding technology was not widely spread in Sweden at that time, he had to fall back on individual solutions. With the use of magnifying glasses, a typewriter and the help of family members and friends who recorded or read texts to him, Lindqvist finished primary school in 1951 at the age of 15.

After a discontinued internship at a local greenery, Lindqvist's aunt contacted the Institute for the Blind in Solna by Stockholm to arrange for him to attend Tomteboda School for the Blind, then the leading school for blind education in Sweden. He stayed there from October 1951 to June 1952. Even if the main motivation was for him to learn reading and writing in braille, Lindqvist also received training in basket weaving, Swedish language and literature, music – he started to play the drums in a jazz band – and sports. Through a gymnastics teacher he was introduced to the ideas of the still young disability movement that advocated for a better inclusion of disabled people into Swedish society. Lindqvist later described this acquaintance as an important founding stone for his later engagement in disability rights advocacy, an experience that was enhanced by the secluded environment of the school:

"It was really a completely new and very different environment that met me at Tomteboda. There were about 150 pupils in all school ages from all over the country. The vast majority had been there since the age of six or seven. It was a closed world."

After his return to Helsingborg in 1952, Lindqvist continued at the local secondary school with a focus on language, using braille books and voice recordings by his sister as aids. He then studied English at Lund University from 1957 to 1960 with the help of book loans from the National Library for the Blind in London. During this time, he also began to work part-time as a travelling teacher for Tomteboda School for the Blind, a job that consisted of visiting and assisting former Tomteboda students who were to be integrated into regular schools in their home towns. After moving to Solna with his wife in 1960, who had been offered the position as typist for braille at Tomteboda, Lindqvist took up studies in German, Nordic languages and literature history at Stockholm University, from which he graduated with a magister degree in 1965.

After the birth of the twins in the same year, his wife began to work from home as a copyist for the study department of the Swedish Association of the Visually Impaired. Due to the strict regulations of the Swedish school department concerning physical impairments among teaching staff at public schools, and practical difficulties during a brief employment as teacher at a secondary school in Stockholm, Lindqvist decided to leave the educational sector.

In an interview with Livsbild, an initiative of the Nordic Museum (Nordiska museet) and the Swedish Disability History Association (HandikappHistoriska Föreningen), he states:

"After pressure from several quarters and with the threat of public debate, the School Board finally gave up and allowed me to do the teacher training as an exception. I was extremely offended by this experience, and together with the experiences from my studies, this came to have great significance for my continued development. A strong sense of justice arose in me and I started thinking in disability political terms."

In 1967, he accepted an invitation of the Swedish Association of the Visually Impaired to become involved in a research project on visual impairment and public education.

== Political career ==
=== Political positions ===
His own struggles as a person with a visual impairment in acquiring the study material necessary for a continued education in public school and university, as well as the months spent at Tomteboda School for the Blind and his continued work with visually impaired pupils have contributed to Lindqvist's rising interest in contemporary socio-political debates that started to critically examine the realities of the Swedish welfare state. In his memoirs Blindstyre (Blind Governance, published 2012), Lindqvist attributed his political orientation towards the Swedish Social Democratic Party, of which he became a member in the early 1970s, to the political views and actions of the then Prime Minister Olof Palme as well as the social democratic politician and former Minister for Finance, Ernst Wigforss. An incident that influenced his political views in particular was the public debate of the Low Income Committee's final report (låginkomstutredningen) of 1970 that gave detailed testimony of the living situations of Swedish citizens, highlighting existing inequalities within society that marked a sharp contrast to official political statements. The reactions of Palme and the Social Democratic Party to expand the Swedish welfare state by introducing far-reaching labor reforms as well as a comprehensive redistributive reform to benefit disadvantaged groups coincided with the emergence of a more and more politicized and vocalized disability movement. Through his work for the Swedish Association of the Visually Impaired, Lindqvist became increasingly exposed to the movement's arguments and demands.

These debates contributed to Lindqvist's realization that the analytical category of disability could be used as an indicator for the degree of welfare and social equality within state administration and societal discourses, a position he refined and continued to defend throughout his later career as a politician as well as an advocate for disability rights:

"When I linked my experiences of the shortcomings within the area of disability to the welfare system that had been built up, I came to the conclusion that what had been done so far was important and reasonable, but still insufficient. I could also see how necessary it was to incorporate the factor of disability as a highly relevant part into the analysis of people's living conditions. The [low income] committee had not done that, and thus an important dimension in the analysis of welfare was lacking."

This debate on the structures, practices and ideals of the Swedish welfare state in the late 1960s and early 1970s also wielded influence among disabled citizens and their organizations, notably the disability activist Vilhelm Ekensteen with his publication På folkhemmets bakgård (In the Backyard of the People's Home, 1968) and the associated, radical leftist disability movement Antihandikapp. Although Lindqvist acknowledged the movement's critical stance towards the prevailing living conditions of persons with disabilities in general, he remained skeptical of their confrontational argumentation and verbal assaults against the more established disability organizations. He instead advocated for a shift of perspectives within these organizations towards a more rights-based approach to disability. The aim was to establish persons with disabilities and their representatives as important members of and contributors to Swedish society and the political process. To this end, Lindqvist advocated a deepening of cooperation between disability organizations, state authorities and the broader public.

=== Member of Parliament, 1983-1995 and Deputy Minister for Social Security, 1985-1991 ===
In 1981, the Stockholm municipal unit (arbetarekommun) of the Social Democratic Party suggested to Lindqvist that he stand as Member of Parliament for the upcoming Swedish elections. He was elected as MP to the Riksdag in October 1982. After leaving parliament in 1985, he was re-elected from 1988 to 1991, 1992, and 1993 to 1995. Following his first term in the Riksdag, in 1985 Lindqvist was appointed deputy minister for social security by Prime Minister Olof Palme. After Palme's assassination in 1986, he continued in this position under Minister for Social Affairs Gertrud Sigurdsen in the Carlsson I Cabinet. His main responsibilities included elderly care, family and disability policies. With the convention of the Carlsson II cabinet in 1990 his position was transformed into minister without portfolio, though with similar jurisdiction. Additionally, matters concerning the state alcohol policy fell within his area of responsibility. Even after leaving his ministerial positions in 1991, Lindqvist continued to work as a special advisor to the Ministry for Social Affairs in the domain of international disability matters.

Upon his appointment as deputy minister in 1985, Lindqvist was the first Swedish politician occupying a higher position with a visual disability. This caused a considerable public echo, not least among the national press. The majority of newspaper and other media contributions were positive, though some of them voiced possible challenges his disability could pose in the day-to-day business of politics. Only a few, however, highlighted his engagement within the Swedish disability community or focused on his political positions and goals. As he later expressed himself on the matter:

"All major media had the news. No one was particularly interested in my potential qualifications for the appointment. Everyone only saw the blindness. The most common question was: 'Are you the world's first blind minister?'"

His six years as deputy minister were marked by attempts to make the Swedish welfare state more open to disadvantaged social groups. Persons with disabilities received particular attention, as his political activities testify. One of his main tasks in this area was the implementation of the National Program of Action on Disability that Sweden had adopted in 1982 as an outcome of the United Nations' International Year of Disabled Persons of 1981, which Lindqvist, as chairman of the Swedish Disability Association and a member of the national planning committee for the Year, had been instrumental in drafting.

During his parliamentary terms, Lindqvist initiated or supported 52 motions to the Swedish Riksdag, many of which concerned the rights and social position of persons with disabilities.

Lindqvist was also involved in political debates concerning prenatal testing and ensuing ethical questions. Together with Margaretha Persson, also she a member of parliament and involved in the Swedish disability movement, he handed in the motion Political Responsibility for Ethical Questions in Adherence to the Beginning of Life (Politiskt ansvar för etiska frågor i anslutning till livets början, Motion 1983/84:1626).

In the mid-1980s, Lindqvist was elected chairman of the Social Democratic Party's disability council with the aim to revise the party's official disability policy. The resulting program, called På alla villkor (On Equal Terms), was, however, not adopted by the party congress.

From 1988 to 1991, Lindqvist also participated in the second national disability inquiry (handikapputredningen), which mapped and analyzed the living situation of persons with disabilities in the Swedish society. The results of the inquiry eventually paved the way for a more comprehensive disability rights legislation, including the disability reform package LSS in 1994 (Lag om Stöd och Service till vissa funktionshindrade, 1993:387), which legally enshrined the right to personal assistance.

Lindqvist left the Riksdag at his own request in 1995.

=== Continued political activities ===
Lindqvist returned to Swedish politics in 1997 as chairman of the Swedish Handicap Institute (hjälpmedelsinstitutet), a position he occupied until 2007. In the same year he was also appointed chairman for the newly established Handicap- and Rehabilitation Research Centre, HAREC (Centrum för rehabiliterings- och handikappvetenskap) at Lund University.

Also in 1997, he was appointed by the then Minister for Social Affairs, Margot Wallström, as responsible collaborator in a governmental project to review and critically assess the implementation of the second disability inquiry (handikapputredningen). Between 1997 and 1999, the project resulted in five publications with a focus on the life situations of persons with disabilities and their contacts with public institutions as well as a final report, Lindqvists nia: nio vägar att utveckla bemötandet av personer med funktionshinder (SOU 1999:21; Lindqvist's Nine: nine ways to develop the attitude towards persons with disabilities). As the project's main result, Lindqvist drew the conclusion that considerable deficits continued to exist regarding the attitudes of society, public officials and health professionals towards persons with disabilities. Some of the key ideas and recommendations that Lindqvist proposed in the final report were later incorporated into a proposition for a national action program for the development of healthcare by Minister for Social Affairs Lars Engqvist (Regeringens proposition 1999/2000:149, Nationell handlingsplan för utveckling av hälso- och sjukvården).

== Disability activism ==
=== In Sweden ===
Lindqvist's engagement in disability rights activism resulted partly from his own experiences with segregated education, the lack of accessible study material for persons who, like him, had a visual impairment, and problems in finding regular employment as a language teacher. Finding solutions to these barriers and thinking critically about integrative aspects of education also became starting points for his professional career at the Swedish Association of the Visually Impaired. One of these projects, PUSS – Pedagogiska undersökningar i synskadades studiesituation (Pedagogical investigations into the study situation of persons with visual impairments), resulted in the development and testing of new study techniques as well as a new sign system in braille for phonetics, mathematics and similar fields. Lindqvist was furthermore involved in discussions on special and integrative education with other Swedish disability organizations, notably the Swedish Disability Association.

In 1970, Lindqvist played a role in Torgny Wickman's sexual education film Mera ur kärlekens språk (More from the Language of Love a.k.a. More about the Language of Love).

Two years later, Lindqvist, as a representative of the Swedish Association of the Visually Impaired, participated in the preparation and launch of the Swedish Disability Association's first political program Ett samhälle för alla (A Society for All) during a congress in the Plenary Hall of the Riksdag in Stockholm. Building on his professional expertise as teacher and educational researcher, he also contributed to the assembly's working group on the education and integration of children with disabilities into regular schools.

Lindqvist became chairman of the Swedish Association of the Visually Impaired in 1975 and held this post for ten years. During this time, he worked towards increased social and governmental recognition of disabled people's equal rights. A major goal was to foster cooperation between disability representatives, politicians and the broader public. Lindqvist expanded this line of work even as he was elected chair of the Swedish Disability Association from 1977 to 1985. A first test case for these political strategies came in form of the first National Disability Inquiry (Handikapputredningen), which the Swedish government initiated in 1965 and which published its final report Kultur åt alla (Culture for All) in 1976 after intensive consultation with the disability organizations. Lindqvist's contributions to the report included better access for persons with visual impairments to literature and newspapers, but also broader questions of rights and equality. In order to publicly promote the achievements of the report, and to remind political authorities of their responsibility for implementation, the Swedish Association of the Visually Impaired together with the Swedish Deaf Association in August 1976 organized a disability rights demonstration through the city centre of Stockholm, the first of its kind in Sweden.

With increased political involvement, first in the Swedish committee for the planning and execution of the United Nations' International Year of Disabled Persons in 1981, and then as Member of Parliament and Deputy Minister for Social Affairs, Lindqvist left his posts in the disability organizations.

From 1992 to 2012, Lindqvist served as chair of HandikappHistoriska Föreningen, the Swedish Disability History Association.

=== Inter- and transnational advocacy ===
Parallel to his activities in the Swedish disability movement, Lindqvist was also engaged in international discussions on the rights of persons with disabilities. As a member of the delegation of the Swedish Association of the Visually Impaired, he attended two regional conferences of the World Council for the Welfare of the Blind (WCWB) in Copenhagen (1969) and São Paulo (1974). In the 1970s, he joined the WCWB as a member and participated in the organization's rehabilitation committee. From 1974 to 1981 he served as chair of the committee. Lindqvist was also active in the International Federation of the Blind (IFB), partaking among other things in a member group that called for increased direct action of visually impaired and blind members within the organization.

Lindqvist was also appointed head of the Swedish delegation to the World Congress of Rehabilitation International (RI) in Winnipeg in 1980. During the congress, a breakaway group of participants with disabilities launched a proposal for a majority representation of disability organizations within RI to counter the dominance of health and rehabilitation professionals. As the assembly rejected the proposal, Lindqvist and other disabled participants left the meeting in protest and decided to establish their own organization run exclusively by persons with disabilities. Disabled People's International (DPI) was formally established in Singapore in 1981. As elected secretary in DPI's board, Lindqvist was entrusted with drafting the organization's statutes.

During the preparations for the United Nations International Year of Disabled Persons in 1981, Lindqvist in his capacity as chair for the Swedish Disability Association was invited by the Swedish government to join the national planning committee as well as the Swedish delegation to the UN. This provided him with a chance to develop and spread his views on the socio-economic dimensions of disability. Together with other international disability rights advocates he provided critical feedback on the drafts for a UN World Program of Action Concerning Disabled Persons, as became apparent in a letter he wrote to the Swedish Social Department on 7 November 1978:

"We cannot agree to the viewpoint that emerges from the UN proposal that disability is a demarcated problem. Disability issues should be integrated as a natural part of all social planning. If the intention of the International Year of Disabled Persons is to create ways to improve the situation for the disabled, we thus have to place disability issues in their factual connections, i.e. in every social area like housing, schools, culture and leisure, social service etc. The UN's program proposal expresses an all too traditional view on disability, therefore the Swedish program should point out that Sweden does not share this view."

Following a Global Meeting of Experts, organized by the United Nations and the Swedish government in Stockholm in 1987, that reviewed the implementation of the World Program of Action Concerning Disabled Persons, ideas were voiced to further integrate disability rights into the global human rights framework. In 1988, Prime Minister Ingvar Carlsson asked Lindqvist to prepare a text for an international disability rights convention, and in spring 1989 a first draft was presented to the forty-fourth session of the United Nations General Assembly. After rejection of the draft by the delegates, Sweden and other countries proposed the Standard Rules on the Equalization of Opportunities for Persons with Disabilities as an alternative, legally non-binding policy instrument. The UN accepted the proposal in 1990, and in 1992 invited Lindqvist to act as their consultant on disability issues as well as to formulate a final text version for the Rules. They were adopted by the General Assembly in 1993. In order to monitor the implementation of the Rules in the member states, the post of UN Special Rapporteur on Disability was created. Lindqvist served in this function for three mandates from 1994 to 2002. The human rights approach to disability and the monitoring of the implementation of the Standard Rules continued to be discussed among UN representatives, experts and disability organizations. To this end Lindqvist organized a seminar in Almåsa, Sweden in 2000:

"Acting upon strong support from both the High Commissioner for Human Rights and the U.N. Commission on Human Rights, I invited a number of human rights experts and disability activists to draft plans and ideas for capacity building, both in the disability field and the human rights field."

In 2003 Lindqvist co-founded Disability Rights Promotion International (DRPI) with Canadian disability activist Marcia Rioux, a non-governmental initiative for the international monitoring of participatory disability rights.

=== UN Special Rapporteur on Disability ===
After the adoption of the Standard Rules, UN Secretary-General Boutros Boutros-Ghali in 1994 asked the Swedish government on their opinion about appointing Lindqvist as first UN Special Rapporteur on Disability with the task to assess and monitor the implementation of the Rules as well as to promote them among the member states of the UN, the UN General Assembly, and the UN Human Rights Council. With financial support from the Swedish and other governments, and supervised by the UN Commission for Social Development, Lindqvist accepted the post for a two-year period, later extended by resolutions of the Economic and Social Council two times (in 1997 and 2000) until 2002. Aided by a panel of experts, Lindqvist visited individual countries to review their progress on the implementation of disability rights, meet with governmental representatives as well as members of disability organizations, provided three global surveys, and participated in conferences and workshops. While the first and second mandates concentrated mainly on the implementation of the Rules in the individual member countries, Lindqvist during his third mandate turned his attention to the future development of measures and human rights instruments to protect and monitor the rights of persons with disabilities, again bringing up the idea of a convention. The UN General Assembly eventually granted the request to elaborate a Convention on the Rights of Persons with Disabilities, which was officially adopted in 2006.

Lindqvist submitted the following reports on Monitoring the implementation of the Standard Rules on the Equalization of Opportunities for Persons with Disabilities to the General Assembly:

- A/52/56 – Report on First Mandate of the Special Rapporteur – Part 1
- A/52/56 – Report on First Mandate of the Special Rapporteur – Part 2
- E/CN.5/2000/3 – Report on Second Mandate of the Special Rapporteur
- E/CN.5/2002/4 – Report on Third Mandate of the Special Rapporteur – Part 1
- E/CN.5/2002/4 – Report on Third Mandate of the Special Rapporteur – Part 2

== Honors and commemorations ==
Lindqvist was appointed honorary member of various disability organizations, both in Sweden and abroad. Other honors and commemorations include:

- 1999 honorary doctorate in social science at Stockholm University
- 2001 honorary doctorate in community medicine at Lund University
- 2013 honorary doctorate in laws at York University
- In 1992, Lindqvist received the H. M. The King's Medal, 12th size gold (silver-gilt) medal on the Order of the Seraphim ribbon
- In 2009, Lindqvist received the International Award of the Swedish National Association of the Deaf for his commitment to the recognition of sign language and the rights of deaf people
- The Bengt Lindqvist Human Rights Prize in Critical Disability Studies is awarded by York University, Canada to a student graduating from the Master's Program in Critical Disability Studies who has produced the best Major Research Paper
- The DRPI AWARE Bengt Lindqvist Inclusive Employer Award was awarded in 2017 by the Hyderabad Inclusive Employer Council, India

== Bibliography (selection) ==
- Lindqvist, Bengt (2012). Blindstyre [Blind Governance]. Stockholm: Hjalmarson & Högberg.
- Lindqvist, Bengt; Rioux, Marcia H.; Samson, Rita M.; Marsolais, Allyson (2007). Moving Forward: Progress in Global Disability Rights Monitoring. Toronto: Disability Rights Promotion International (DRPI).
- Lindqvist, Bengt (2006). Trovärdighetens pris: utredning om samarbetet mellan läkemedelsföretag och brukarorganisationer [The price of credibility: investigation of the cooperation between pharmaceutical companies and consumer organizations]. Stockholm: Läkemedelsinsdustriföreningen (LIF).
- Lindqvist, Bengt (1999). Lindqvists nia. Nio vägar att utveckla bemötandet av personer med funktionshinder: slutbetänkande / Utredningen om bemötande av personer med funktionshinder [Lindqvist's Nine: nine ways to develop the attitude towards persons with disabilities]. Stockholm: Fakta info direkt, SOU 1999:21.
- Lindqvist, Bengt (1987). Vi har lärt oss att kampen lönar sig [We have learned that the fight pays off]. Stockholm: Handikappförbundens centralkomité.
- Lindqvist, Bengt (1973). Report on European seminar concerning the training and employment situation of the blind. Brussels: publisher not identified.
- Lindqvist, Bengt; Trowald, Nils (1972). European conference on educational research for the visually handicapped. Projektet PUSS, 99-1022085-7; / Lärarhögskolan i Uppsala, Pedagogiska institutionen, 99-0230765-5; 31. Uppsala: Lärarhögskolan i Uppsala.
- Lindqvist, Bengt; Trowald, Nils (1970). Individualintegrering av gravt synskadade elever i grundskolan: synpunkter efter en lärarenkät. Projektet PUSS, 99-1022085-7 [Pedagogical investigations into the study situation of persons with visual impairments]. Uppsala: Lärarhögskolan i Uppsala.
