= List of ambassadors of Sweden to Angola =

Ambassador of Sweden to Angola
- Lesser coat of arms of the Kingdom of Sweden
- Incumbent; Dag Sjöögren since 2026
- Ministry for Foreign Affairs; Swedish Embassy, Luanda
- Style: His or Her Excellency (formal); Mr. or Madam Ambassador (informal)
- Reports to: Minister for Foreign Affairs
- Seat: Stockholm, Sweden (Note: Stockholm-based ambassador in Luanda from 1 December 2022.)
- Appointer: Government of Sweden
- Term length: No fixed term
- Formation: 1976
- First holder: Kaj Falkman
- Website: Swedish Embassy, Luanda

The Ambassador of Sweden to Angola (known formally as the Ambassador of the Kingdom of Sweden to the Republic of Angola) is the official representative of the government of Sweden to the president of Angola and government of Angola.

== History ==
Angola became independent on 11 November 1975. On 18 February 1976, Sweden (together with Norway, Denmark, the Netherlands, the United Kingdom, Italy, Ireland, and Switzerland) recognized the MPLA government in Angola. In a telegram to Foreign Minister José Eduardo dos Santos, Sweden's Foreign Minister Sven Andersson expressed the Swedish government's best wishes and proposed diplomatic relations between Sweden and Angola.

The Swedish embassy in Luanda opened in October 1976, merely six months after the recognition. Kaj Falkman was appointed Sweden's first ambassador to Angola. On 9 November 1976, Falkman presented his credentials to President Agostinho Neto in the grand hall of the Palace of the People.

The Swedish embassy closed in November 2022. On 1 December 2022, an ambassador for Angola took office, stationed in Stockholm. The ambassador travels to Angola regularly.

== List of representatives ==
Name	Period	Resident / Non-resident	Title	Resident / Concurrent accreditation	Notes	Presented credentials	Ref
People's Republic of Angola (1975–1992)
Kaj Falkman	1976–1978	Resident	Ambassador	Also accredited to São Tomé (from 1977)		9 November 1976	
Göte Magnusson	1978–1981	Resident	Ambassador	Also accredited to São Tomé			
Leif Sjöström	1982–1985	Resident	Ambassador	Also accredited to São Tomé			
Sten Rylander	1985–1988	Resident	Ambassador	Also accredited to São Tomé			
Per Lindström	1988–1992	Resident	Ambassador	Also accredited to São Tomé			
Republic of Angola (1992–present)
Anders Möllander	1992–1995	Resident	Ambassador	Also accredited to São Tomé (from 1993)			
Lena Sundh	1995–2000	Resident	Ambassador	Also accredited to São Tomé (from 1996)			
Roger Gartoft	2000–2003	Resident	Ambassador	Also accredited to São Tomé			
Anders Hagelberg	2003–2006	Resident	Ambassador	Also accredited to São Tomé			
Erik Åberg	2006–2009	Resident	Ambassador	Also accredited to São Tomé (until 2008) (Note: Responsibility for São Tomé and Príncipe was transferred to the Swedish Embassy in Lisbon in 2008.)			
Bo Emthén	2009–2012	Resident	Ambassador				
Lena Sundh	September 2012 – September 2016	Resident	Ambassador				
Lennart Killander Larsson	September 2016 – 2019	Resident	Ambassador				
Ewa Polano	1 September 2019 – 2022	Resident	Ambassador				
Lennart Killander Larsson	1 December 2022 – 2026	Non-resident	Ambassador	Resident in Stockholm			
Dag Sjöögren	2026–present	Non-resident	Ambassador	Resident in Stockholm			

== See also ==
- Embassy of Sweden, Luanda
