= WCWB (disambiguation) =

WCWB may refer to:

- WCWB (FM), a radio station (104.9 FM) licensed to serve Marathon, Wisconsin, United States
- WYBA, a radio station (90.1 FM) licensed to Coldwater, Michigan, United States, which used the call sign WCWB from June 2006 to June 2010
- WMGT-TV, a television station (channel 40, virtual channel 41) licensed to Macon, Georgia, United States, which used the call signs WCWB or WCWB-TV from 1968 to December 1983
- WPNT, a television station (channel 42, virtual channel 22) licensed to Pittsburgh, Pennsylvania, United States, which used the call sign WCWB from January 1998 to April 2006
- World Council for the Welfare of the Blind
