= List of ambassadors of Sweden to the Democratic Republic of the Congo =

Ambassador of Sweden to Congo-Kinshasa
- Lesser coat of arms of the Kingdom of Sweden
- Incumbent; Joakim Vaverka since 2024
- Ministry for Foreign Affairs; Swedish Embassy, Kinshasa
- Style: His or Her Excellency (formal); Mr. or Madam Ambassador (informal)
- Reports to: Minister for Foreign Affairs
- Residence: Avenue De Lemera, Gombe (Note: The source lists the address as Avenue Trois Z in Kalina. Avenue Trois Z was renamed Avenue De Lemera, and Kalina was renamed Gombe in 1971. In the 1960s, the residence was located at 89 Avenue Lippens.)
- Seat: Kinshasa, Congo-Kinshasa
- Appointer: Government of Sweden
- Term length: No fixed term
- Inaugural holder: Axel Lewenhaupt
- Formation: 1962
- Website: Swedish Embassy, Kinshasa

The Ambassador of Sweden to Congo-Kinshasa (known formally as the Ambassador of the Kingdom of Sweden to the Democratic Republic of the Congo) is the official representative of the government of Sweden to the president of the Democratic Republic of the Congo and government of the Democratic Republic of the Congo.

== History ==
On the occasion of the Republic of the Congo gaining independence on 30 June 1960, Acting Foreign Minister Herman Kling stated in a congratulatory telegram to Congo's Foreign Minister Justin Bomboko that the Swedish government recognized Congo as a sovereign and independent state. Sweden was represented at the establishment of the new state by the head of the political division and a director at the Swedish Ministry for Foreign Affairs Sverker Åström, who, during the celebrations on 1 July 1960, in Léopoldville, conveyed the King's congratulations to the new state's president, Joseph Kasa-Vubu. Åström also delivered a letter to Congo's Foreign Minister, in which the Swedish government welcomed Congo into the community of free nations and expressed hopes for the development of economic, cultural, and other relations between the two countries.

Six months later, in January 1961, it was proposed in the government budget bill that the Swedish consulate in Léopoldville be replaced by an embassy. On 8 July 1962, the King in Council announced that Count Axel Lewenhaupt had been appointed as Sweden's ambassador to Léopoldville. In September of the same year, it was announced that an agreement establishing diplomatic relations between the governments of Sweden and the Republic of the Congo had been reached. Lewenhaupt, as Sweden's first ambassador to Congo, presented his credentials in October 1962.

In September 1981, the Ministry for Foreign Affairs proposed closing the embassy in Kinshasa. What remained was an embassy office managed by an ambassador based in another location. In November 1982, Ambassador Karl Henrik Andersson was reassigned to the Foreign Ministry in Stockholm while retaining his ambassadorial position for Kinshasa and other accredited posts. The embassy was now managed by a chargé d'affaires and an assistant, while the ambassador was stationed in Stockholm.

In August 1995, the Swedish government decided to close the embassy in Kinshasa, Zaire. The embassy officially closed on 15 December, as part of cost-saving measures implemented for the foreign service. In its place, an honorary consulate general was established in Kinshasa on 1 November 1995. Two years later, in October 1997, the Swedish government announced plans to reopen a Swedish embassy in Kinshasa. In February 1998, Eva Emnéus was appointed counselor at the embassy in Kinshasa. Her appointment in the spring reinstated the chargé d'affaires position, which had been vacant since December 1995. Three years later, a resident ambassador was once again accredited in Kinshasa.

== List of representatives ==
Name	Period	Resident / Non-resident	Title	Resident / Concurrent accreditation	Notes	Presented credentials	Ref
Republic of the Congo / Democratic Republic of the Congo (1960–1965)
Axel Lewenhaupt	1962–1963	Resident	Ambassador			October 1962	
Dag Malm	1964–1965	Resident	Ambassador				
Democratic Republic of the Congo (1965–1971)
Dag Malm	1965–1967	Resident	Ambassador	Also accredited to Cameroon, Gabon, and the Republic of the Congo			
Olof Bjurström	1967–1971	Resident	Ambassador	Also accredited to Cameroon, Equatorial Guinea (from 1969), Gabon, and the People's Republic of the Congo			
Republic of Zaire (1971–1997)
Henrik Ramel	1971–1976	Resident	Ambassador	Also accredited to Cameroon (from 1972), Equatorial Guinea (from 1973), Gabon (from 1972), and the People's Republic of the Congo (from 1972)			
Ragnar Petri	1976–1979	Resident	Ambassador	Also accredited to Cameroon, Gabon, and the People's Republic of the Congo (from three from 1977)			
Karl Henrik Andersson	1979 – November 1982	Resident	Ambassador	Also accredited to Cameroon (from 1980) and Gabon (from 1980)			
Erik Häggström	1982–1985	Resident	Chargé d'affaires (Note: Had the following diplomatic rank: embassy counselor)				
Karl Henrik Andersson	1983–1984	Non-resident	Ambassador	Resident in Stockholm. Accredited to Cameroon, Central African Republic (from 1983), Gabon, People's Republic of the Congo (from 1983), and Zaire			
Olof Skoglund	1985–1990	Non-resident	Ambassador	Resident in Stockholm. Accredited to Cameroon, Central African Republic, Equatorial Guinea, Gabon (from 1987), People's Republic of the Congo (from 1986), and Zaire			
Hans Ahlberg	1985–1989	Resident	Chargé d'affaires				
Lars Ekström	1988–1993	Resident	Chargé d'affaires				
Bengt Rösiö	1990–1992	Non-resident	Ambassador	Resident in Stockholm. Accredited to Central African Republic, Equatorial Guinea, Congo, and Zaire			
Carl-Erhard Lindahl	1992–1997	Non-resident	Ambassador	Resident in Stockholm. Accredited to Cameroon, Cape Verde (from 1994 (Note: Sveriges statskalender (1999), p. 184 states the year 1992. Vem är det (2001), p. 690 states the year 1994, which is also stated in Sveriges statskalender (1995), p. 182.)), Central African Republic, Chad (from 1996), Congo (from 1994), Equatorial Guinea, Gabon, Guinea-Bissau (from 1994 (Note: Sveriges statskalender (1999), p. 181 states the year 1992. Vem är det (2001), p. 690 states the year 1994 which is also stated in Sveriges statskalender (1995), p. 179.)), and Zaire			
Ove Svensson	1994–1995	Resident	Chargé d'affaires				
Democratic Republic of the Congo (1997–present)
Carl-Erhard Lindahl	1997–2001	Non-resident	Ambassador	Resident in Stockholm. Accredited to Cameroon, Cape Verde (until 1999), Central African Republic, Chad, Democratic Republic of the Congo (from 1998), Republic of the Congo, Equatorial Guinea, Gabon, and Guinea-Bissau (until 1999)			
Eva Emnéus	1998–2000	Resident	Chargé d'affaires				
Erik Backman	2000–2001	Resident	Chargé d'affaires (Note: Had the following diplomatic rank: minister)				
Robert Rydberg	2001–2003	Resident	Ambassador	Also accredited to Cameroon (from 2002), Central African Republic, Chad (from 2002), Equatorial Guinea (from 2002), Gabon (from 2002), and the Republic of the Congo (from 2002)			
Magnus Wernstedt	2003–2007	Resident	Ambassador	Also accredited to Cameroon (from 2004), Central African Republic (from 2004), Chad (from 2004), Equatorial Guinea (from 2004), Gabon (from 2004), and the Republic of the Congo			
Helena Rietz	2007–2008	Resident	Ambassador	Also accredited to Cameroon, Central African Republic, Equatorial Guinea, Gabon, and the Republic of the Congo			
Johan Borgstam	2009–2011	Resident	Ambassador	Also accredited to Cameroon, Central African Republic (from 2010), Chad, Equatorial Guinea (from 2010), Gabon (from 2010), and the Republic of the Congo			
Mette Sunnergren	2011–2013	Resident	Ambassador	Also accredited to Gabon			
Annika Ben David	2013–2016	Resident	Ambassador	Also accredited to Cameroon, Gabon, and the Republic of the Congo			
Maria Håkansson	September 2016 – 2019	Resident	Ambassador	Also accredited to Cameroon, Equatorial Guinea, Gabon, and the Republic of the Congo		23 January 2017	
Henric Råsbrant	1 September 2019 – 2024	Resident	Ambassador	Also accredited to Gabon		31 October 2019	
Joakim Vaverka	2024–present	Resident	Ambassador	Also accredited to Gabon		18 September 2024	
