= Croatian Association of the Blind =

Disability organization in Croatia

The Croatian Association of the Blind (Croatian: Hrvatski savez slijepih) is an organization structured to help blind people in everyday life. It is a member of both European Blind Union and World Blind Union. It is structured so as to contain 26 local member organizations, which altogether cover the whole Croatia. These organizations are joined by the blind people and employ volunteers. Association headquarters are situated on Radnička Road in Zagreb.
