= List of ambassadors of Sweden to Guinea-Bissau =

Ambassador of Sweden to Guinea-Bissau
- Lesser coat of arms of the Kingdom of Sweden
- Incumbent; Elisabeth Eklund since 2022
- Ministry for Foreign Affairs; Swedish Embassy, Lisbon
- Style: His or Her Excellency (formal); Mr. or Madam Ambassador (informal)
- Reports to: Minister for Foreign Affairs
- Seat: Lisbon, Portugal (Note: The Swedish ambassador to Guinea-Bissau is resident in Lisbon, Portugal.)
- Appointer: Government of Sweden
- Term length: No fixed term
- Inaugural holder: Bengt Friedman
- Formation: 1975

The Ambassador of Sweden to Guinea-Bissau (known formally as the Ambassador of the Kingdom of Sweden to the Republic of Guinea-Bissau) is the official representative of the government of Sweden to the president of Guinea-Bissau and government of Guinea-Bissau. The Swedish ambassador is resident in Lisbon, Portugal.

== History ==
Sweden recognized Guinea-Bissau on 9 August 1974 and subsequently took the initiative to establish diplomatic relations with the government of the republic. In mid-March 1975, Sweden's ambassador in Monrovia, Liberia, Bengt Friedman, presented his credentials to President Luís Cabral. The ambassador has been concurrently accredited from various countries over the years: Liberia (1975–1977), Ivory Coast (1979), Portugal (1980–1994, 2016 (Note: Sweden's ambassador in Lisbon, Portugal, Caroline Fleetwood, presented her credentials to President José Mário Vaz on 5 May 2016. It is unclear whether Ambassador Fleetwood, who had been ambassador in Lisbon since 2012, was also appointed non-resident ambassador to Bissau at that time or whether it only happened in 2016 when she presented her credentials.)–present), Sweden (1994–1999), and Senegal (2000–2010).

After the country's liberation from Portugal, Sweden established an embassy office with a development assistance office in the capital Bissau in autumn 1976. The office, which was managed by the Swedish International Development Cooperation Agency (SIDA), was formally integrated into the embassy on 1 July 1994. The embassy's staff was reduced in 1997 and in December 1999 the mission was closed. The final period of activity was marked by the civil war and its consequences. The last remaining official was transferred to Dakar, Senegal, from where the final formalities were handled. The embassy office was headed by an official from SIDA who acted as chargé d'affaires ad interim when the Swedish ambassador to Guinea-Bissau was not in the country.

== List of representatives ==
Name	Period	Resident/Non resident	Title	Notes	Presentation of credentials	Ref
Bengt Friedman	1975–1976	Non-resident	Ambassador	Resident in Monrovia.	March 1975	
Olof Skoglund	1976–1977	Non-resident	Ambassador	Resident in Monrovia		
Patrik Engellau	1976–1978	Resident	Chargé d'affaires ad interim (Note: Chargé d'affaires ad interim and development cooperation attaché (biståndsattaché).)			
–	1978–1978	Non-resident	Ambassador	Vacant		
Hans-Olle Olsson	1979–1979	Non-resident	Ambassador	Resident in Abidjan		
Klas Markensten	1978–1980	Resident	Chargé d'affaires ad interim (Note: Chargé d'affaires ad interim and development cooperation attaché (biståndsattaché).)			
Sven Fredrik Hedin	1980 (Note: Sveriges statskalender (1986) states the year 1980 while the 1993 edition of Vem är det (1992) states the year 1979.)–1986	Non-resident	Ambassador	Resident in Lisbon		
Sven-Åke Svensson	1980–1982	Resident	Chargé d'affaires ad interim (Note: Chargé d'affaires ad interim and head of the aid office (biståndskontorschef).)			
Ann-Charlotte Olstedt	1982–1986	Resident	Chargé d'affaires ad interim (Note: Chargé d'affaires ad interim and head of the aid office (biståndskontorschef).)			
Lennart Rydfors	1986–1988	Non-resident	Ambassador	Resident in Lisbon		
Lars Berggren	1986–1989	Resident	Chargé d'affaires ad interim (Note: Chargé d'affaires ad interim and head of the aid office (biståndskontorschef).)			
Göran Hasselmark	1989–1994	Non-resident	Ambassador	Resident in Lisbon		
Rolf Folkesson	1989–1993	Resident	Chargé d'affaires ad interim			
Nils Olof Malmer	1993–1997	Resident	Chargé d'affaires ad interim (Note: Malmer was chargé d'affaires ad interim with the diplomatic rank of counsellor. He was also head of the aid office (biståndskontorschef).)			
Carl-Erhard Lindahl	1994–1999	Non-resident	Ambassador	Resident in Stockholm		(Note: Sveriges statskalender (1999) gives the year as 1992 which is incorrect. The correct year is 1994, as confirmed by earlier editions, for example the 1997 edition, as well as the 2001 edition of Vem är det (2000).)
Ulla Andrén Sandberg	1997–1999	Resident	Chargé d'affaires ad interim (Note: Andrén Sandberg was chargé d'affaires ad interim with the diplomatic rank of counsellor.)			
Roger Gartoft	1999–1999 (Note: In mid-1999, Roger Gartoft succeeded Ulla Andrén as chargé d'affaires in Bissau. His specific task there was to oversee the closing of the Swedish Embassy.)	Resident	Chargé d'affaires ad interim			
Bo Wilén	2000–2002	Non-resident	Ambassador	Resident in Dakar		
Annika Magnusson	2002–2005	Non-resident	Ambassador	Resident in Dakar		
Agneta Bohman	2006–2010	Non-resident	Ambassador	Resident in Dakar		
?	2010–2016	Non-resident	Ambassador			
Caroline Fleetwood	2016–2017	Non-resident	Ambassador	Resident in Lisbon	5 May 2016	
Helena Pilsas Ahlin	2017–2022	Non-resident	Ambassador	Resident in Lisbon	25 November 2021	
Elisabeth Eklund	2022–2026	Non-resident	Ambassador	Resident in Lisbon	17 January 2025	

== See also ==
- Guinea-Bissau–Sweden relations
