= List of ambassadors of Sweden to Togo =

Ambassador of Sweden to Togo
- Lesser coat of arms of the Kingdom of Sweden
- Incumbent; Katrin Månsson since 2025
- Ministry for Foreign Affairs
- Style: His or Her Excellency (formal); Mr. or Madam Ambassador (informal)
- Reports to: Minister for Foreign Affairs
- Seat: Stockholm, Sweden (Note: The Swedish ambassador to Togo is resident in Stockholm, Sweden.)
- Appointer: Government of Sweden
- Term length: No fixed term
- Formation: 6 June 1979
- First holder: Vidar Hellners

The Ambassador of Sweden to Togo (known formally as the Ambassador of the Kingdom of Sweden to Togolese Republic) is the official representative of the government of Sweden to the president of Togo and government of Togo. Since Sweden does not have an embassy in Lomé, Sweden's ambassador to Togo is based in Stockholm, Sweden.

== History ==
The Togolese Republic was proclaimed on 27 April 1960, and on the same day the country was recognized by Sweden. In a congratulatory telegram to Togo's Prime Minister Sylvanus Olympio, Sweden's Minister for Foreign Affairs, Östen Undén, expressed hope for friendly and cordial relations between Sweden and Togo.

On 6 June 1979, Sweden's ambassador in Lagos, Nigeria, Vidar Hellners, was also accredited to Lomé, Togo. He thus became Sweden's first ambassador to Togo.

After Sweden opened an embassy in Abidjan, Ivory Coast, in 1978, the ambassador there assumed accreditation for Togo starting in 1983. In 2000, the accreditation was transferred back to Sweden's ambassador in Nigeria. Since 2015, the position has been held by a Stockholm-based ambassador-at-large, who is also ambassador to a number of other countries in West Africa.

== List of representatives ==
Name	Period	Title	Notes	Presented credentials	Ref
Vidar Hellners	6 June 1979 – 1981	Ambassador	Resident in Lagos		
Bengt Borglund	1983–1987	Ambassador	Resident in Abidjan		
Arne Ekfeldt	1987–1992	Ambassador	Resident in Abidjan		
Peter Bruce	1992–1995	Ambassador	Resident in Abidjan		
Bo Wilén	1996–1999	Ambassador	Resident in Abidjan		
Lars Ekström	2000 (Note: Sveriges statskalender lists Ambassador Lars Ekström in Nigeria as accredited, among others, to Benin and Togo from 1997, which is most likely a misprint. Ambassador Bo Wilén in Ivory Coast was accredited to Benin and Togo from 1996 to 1999 according to the 1999 edition of Sveriges statskalender as well as in Vem är det (2000). Ekström was most likely accredited to Benin and Togo from the year 2000, as the same source states that Ekström was accredited to Niger from that year and that Bo Wilén left the post in 1999.)–2002	Ambassador	Resident in Lagos		
Birgitta Holst Alani	2002–2005	Ambassador	Resident in Abuja		
Lars-Owe Persson	2005–2008	Ambassador	Resident in Abuja		
Per Lindgärde	2008–2012	Ambassador	Resident in Abuja		
Svante Kilander	2012–2015	Ambassador	Resident in Abuja		
Per Carlson	2015–2017	Ambassador	Resident in Stockholm	January 2016	
–	2017–2021	Ambassador	Vacant		
Mia Rimby	2021–2025	Ambassador	Resident in Stockholm		
Katrin Månsson	2025–present	Ambassador	Resident in Stockholm		
