= Göran Hasselmark =

Swedish diplomat (born 1936)

- Born: Per Göran Hasselmark; 28 December 1936 (age 89); Stockholm, Sweden
- Education: Östra Real
- Occupation: Diplomat
- Years active: 1963–2002
- Spouse: Berit Lindborg (m. 1965)
- Children: 2

Per Göran Hasselmark (born 28 December 1936) is a Swedish diplomat who served in the Swedish Ministry for Foreign Affairs for nearly four decades. After joining the ministry as an attaché in 1963, he held diplomatic postings in Paris, Rio de Janeiro, Dar es Salaam, and Maputo, where he played a key role in Sweden's relations with the Portuguese-speaking liberation movements in southern Africa and helped establish Sweden's embassy in newly independent Mozambique. He later served as ambassador to Zambia (1979–1983), Chief of Protocol at the Ministry for Foreign Affairs (1983–1989), ambassador to Portugal (1989–1994), and ambassador to Australia (1994–2000), with concurrent accreditation to New Zealand. From 2000 to 2002, he was Sweden's ambassador-at-large for several countries in Oceania. As Chief of Protocol, he coordinated major state visits and organised the international aspects of Prime Minister Olof Palme's state funeral in 1986.

== Early life ==
Hasselmark was born on 28 December 1936 in Stockholm, Sweden, the son of the business executive Allan Hasselmark (1904–1975) and his wife, Karin (née Markström). His father worked in the restaurant industry, serving as vice chairman of the Stockholm Hotel and Restaurant Association from 1944 to 1953. He was also managing director and manager of several prominent Stockholm establishments, including Restaurant Cecil, Operakällaren, Hotel Apollonia, and the Strand Hotel.

Hasselmark graduated from the classical (Latin) programme at Östra Real on 1 May 1955. In August 1957, he completed the Swedish Air Force's training course in air surveillance and ground combat control for prospective reserve officers at F 20 in Uppsala, graduating top of his class. He received a Candidate of Law degree in 1962.

== Career ==
Hasselmark joined the Swedish Ministry for Foreign Affairs as an attaché in June 1963, alongside future ambassadors Carl-Erhard Lindahl, Rasmus Rasmusson, Lennart Watz, and Kjell Anneling. He was appointed second secretary at Sweden's delegation to the OECD in Paris in 1964, and first secretary at the Swedish Embassy in Rio de Janeiro in 1966. During his posting in Rio de Janeiro, he appeared in Serge Roullet's 1969 film Benito Cereno and welcomed the Swedish training ship HSwMS Älvsnabben during its visit in December 1967.

In 1969, Hasselmark returned to the Ministry for Foreign Affairs as a desk officer (departementssekreterare). He was posted as first secretary to Dar es Salaam in 1973. Because he spoke Portuguese, he was responsible for contacts with the Portuguese-speaking liberation movements FRELIMO in Mozambique and the MPLA in Angola. This work led to his being asked to open Sweden's embassy in Mozambique following the country's independence.

He served as counsellor and chargé d'affaires in Maputo from 1976, became a deputy director (kansliråd) at the Ministry for Foreign Affairs in 1978, and was appointed ambassador to Lusaka in 1979, serving until 1983, while also being accredited to Malawi. In Zambia, he once again worked closely with southern African liberation movements, particularly those of Namibia and South Africa. Lusaka was home to the United Nations Institute for Namibia, which trained Namibians for future leadership roles. His time there combined political and development work, as Zambia was one of Sweden's largest recipients of foreign aid.

From 1983 to 1989, Hasselmark served as Chief of Protocol at the Ministry for Foreign Affairs. He acted as the principal liaison between foreign embassies and Swedish authorities, handling legal and diplomatic matters, overseeing the welfare of the diplomatic corps in Stockholm, and coordinating incoming state visits as well as the Swedish royal couple's official visits abroad in cooperation with the Royal Court. Among the visits he organised were those of King Carl XVI Gustaf and Queen Silvia to Brazil in 1984, Egypt in 1986, Iceland in 1987, and New Zealand in 1989. He also arranged the June 1984 visit of Chinese Premier Zhao Ziyang, then the highest-ranking Chinese official ever to visit Sweden. Following the assassination of Prime Minister Olof Palme in 1986, Hasselmark was responsible for organising the international aspects of Palme's state funeral.

Hasselmark was appointed ambassador to Portugal in 1989, serving until 1994, while also being accredited to Cape Verde and Guinea-Bissau. He then served as ambassador to Australia from 1994 to 2000. He was concurrently accredited to New Zealand between 1995 and 2000. After returning to Stockholm in 2000, he served as ambassador-at-large for several countries in Oceania, representing Sweden to Tonga, Vanuatu, Papua New Guinea, and Samoa (2000–2002), and to Fiji and the Solomon Islands (2001–2002).

== Personal life ==
On 14 April 1960, Hasselmark became engaged to Ulrika von Stedingk, daughter of Baron Victor von Stedingk and his wife, née Nyholm, of Djursholm.

On 9 July 1965, he married the registered nurse and midwife Berit Lindborg-Guthrie (born 1938) in Paris, France. She was the daughter of the physician Bertil Lindborg and Maud (née Holmström). The ceremony was officiated by Sweden's ambassador to France, Ragnar Kumlin.

Hasselmark had two children: his stepson, Neil (born 1960), and his adopted daughter, Martina (born 1978).

== Awards ==
- (Portugal) Grand Cross of the Order of Prince Henry (13 January 1987)

== Filmography ==
- Benito Cereno (1969) as Captain Amaso Delano (credited as Georges Selmark)

Diplomatic posts
Preceded by Ove Heyman	Ambassador of Sweden to Zambia; 1979–1983	Succeeded by Jan Ölander
Preceded by Ove Heyman	Ambassador of Sweden to Malawi; 1979–1983	Succeeded by Jan Ölander
Preceded by Lennart Rydfors	Ambassador of Sweden to Portugal; 1989–1994	Succeeded by Kerstin Asp-Johnsson
Preceded by Lennart Rydfors	Ambassador of Sweden to Guinea-Bissau; 1989–1994	Succeeded by Carl-Erhard Lindahl
Preceded by Lennart Rydfors	Ambassador of Sweden to Cape Verde; 1989–1994	Succeeded by Carl-Erhard Lindahl
Preceded by Bo Heinebäck	Ambassador of Sweden to Australia; 1994–2000	Succeeded by Lars-Erik Wingren
Preceded by Bo Heinebäck	Ambassador of Sweden to the Solomon Islands; 1994–1995	Succeeded by Kaj Falkman
Preceded by Karin Ahrland	Ambassador of Sweden to New Zealand; 1995–2000	Succeeded by Lars-Erik Wingren
Preceded by Kaj Falkman	Ambassador of Sweden to Tonga; 2000–2002	Succeeded by Lars-Erik Wingren
Preceded by Kaj Falkman	Ambassador of Sweden to Vanuatu; 2000–2002	Succeeded by Lars-Erik Wingren
Preceded by Kaj Falkman	Ambassador of Sweden to the Papua New Guinea; 2000–2002	Succeeded by Greger Widgren
Preceded by Kaj Falkman	Ambassador of Sweden to Samoa; 2000–2002	Succeeded by Greger Widgren
Preceded by Kaj Falkman	Ambassador of Sweden to the Solomon Islands; 2001–2002	Succeeded by Greger Widgren
Preceded by Kaj Falkman	Ambassador of Sweden to Fiji; 2001–2002	Succeeded by Greger Widgren
