= Carl-Erhard Lindahl =

Swedish diplomat (born 1935)

- Born: Carl-Erhard Axel Lindahl; 26 April 1935 (age 91); Sölvesborg, Sweden
- Education: Lund University
- Occupation: Diplomat
- Years active: 1963–2001
- Spouse(s): Le Bich Hanh (m. 1988) Ann Lindahl

Carl-Erhard Axel Lindahl (born 26 April 1935) is a Swedish diplomat. Lindahl had a long diplomatic career spanning nearly four decades. Starting as an attaché in 1963, he served in various roles across Europe, the Middle East, Africa, and Latin America, including as ambassador to multiple countries such as Guatemala, Vietnam, and Peru. Notably, he contributed to Mozambique's foreign administration during a secondment in the late 1970s. From 1992 to 2001, he was stationed in Stockholm with ambassadorial responsibilities for numerous African nations.

== Early life ==
Lindahl was born on 26 April 1935 in Sölvesborg, Sweden, the son of Carl Lindahl, a merchant, and his wife Mildred (née Wikfeldt). On 15-20 August 1960, Lindahl, as a student at Lund University, was a Swedish delegate at the Student Movement for the United Nations annual conference in Lund. During his studies in Lund, he was also chairman of the Swedish Foreign Policy Association (Utrikespolitiska föreningen). He later earned a Master of Laws and Social Sciences (jur.pol.mag.) degree from Lund University in 1964.

== Career ==
Lindahl began his career as an attaché at the Ministry for Foreign Affairs in 1963. He was posted to Lisbon from 1964 to 1965, served as an embassy secretary in Tel Aviv from 1965 to 1968, and worked as an administrative officer (kanslisekreterare), at the Ministry for Foreign Affairs from 1968 to 1971. During this time, he also served with the OECD in Paris in 1970. From 1971 to 1976, he was first embassy secretary in Addis Ababa, followed by a posting in Brasília from 1976 to 1977, where he became an embassy counselor in 1977. He took a leave of absence from 1977 to 1979. Beginning on 1 August 1977, Lindahl was seconded to the Mozambican Ministry of Foreign Affairs in Maputo, where he worked as an expert contributing to the establishment of Mozambique's foreign administration.

In 1979, Lindahl was appointed deputy director (kansliråd) at the Ministry for Foreign Affairs. He served as minister in Guatemala City and Managua from 1979 to 1981, and as ambassador to Guatemala City, Tegucigalpa, Managua, and San José from 1981 to 1983. In 1983, he returned to Stockholm as ambassador, before serving in Vientiane, Laos, from 1983 to 1984, and in Hanoi as ambassador from 1985 to 1989. He was then ambassador to Lima and La Paz from 1989 to 1992.

From 1992 to 2001, Lindahl was stationed in Stockholm as ambassador-at-large, with responsibility for several countries in Central and West Africa, including Equatorial Guinea (Malabo), the Central African Republic (Bangui), the Democratic Republic of the Congo (Kinshasa), Cameroon (Yaoundé), Gabon (Libreville, from 1992), the Republic of the Congo (Brazzaville), Guinea-Bissau (Bissau), Cape Verde (Praia, from 1994), Guinea (Conakry, 1995–1996), and Chad (N'Djamena, from 1996).

== Personal life ==
In 1988, Lindahl married Le Bich Hanh. He later married Ann Lindahl (born 1958).

Diplomatic posts
Preceded by Henrik Ramel	Ambassador of Sweden to Guatemala; 1981–1983	Succeeded by Krister Göranson
Preceded by Henrik Ramel	Ambassador of Sweden to Honduras; 1981–1983	Succeeded by Krister Göranson
Preceded by Henrik Ramel	Ambassador of Sweden to Nicaragua; 1981–1983	Succeeded by Göte Magnusson
Preceded by Henrik Ramel	Ambassador of Sweden to Costa Rica; 1981–1983	Succeeded by Göte Magnusson
Preceded by Ragnar Dromberg	Ambassador of Sweden to Vietnam; 1985–1989	Succeeded by Birgitta Johansson
Preceded by Hans Linton	Ambassador of Sweden to Peru; 1989–1992	Succeeded by Lars Schönander
Preceded by Hans Linton	Ambassador of Sweden to Bolivia; 1989–1992	Succeeded by Lars Schönander
Preceded by Bengt Rösiö	Ambassador of Sweden to Equatorial Guinea; 1992–2001	Succeeded by Robert Rydberg
Preceded by Bengt Rösiö	Ambassador of Sweden to the Central African Republic; 1992–2001	Succeeded by Robert Rydberg
Preceded by Bengt Rösiö	Ambassador of Sweden to Zaire; 1992–1997	Succeeded by Himself¹
Preceded by Himself¹	Ambassador of Sweden to the Democratic Republic of the Congo; 1998–2001	Succeeded by Robert Rydberg
Preceded by Olof Skoglund	Ambassador of Sweden to Cameroon; 1992–2001	Succeeded by Robert Rydberg
Preceded by Olof Skoglund	Ambassador of Sweden to Gabon; 1992–2001	Succeeded by Robert Rydberg
Preceded by Bengt Rösiö	Ambassador of Sweden to the Republic of the Congo; 1994–2001	Succeeded by Robert Rydberg
Preceded by Göran Hasselmark	Ambassador of Sweden to Guinea-Bissau; 1994–1999	Succeeded by Bo Wilén
Preceded by Göran Hasselmark	Ambassador of Sweden to Cape Verde; 1994–1999	Succeeded by Bo Wilén
Preceded by Magnus Faxén	Ambassador of Sweden to Guinea; 1995–1996	Succeeded by Nils-Erik Schyberg
Preceded by None	Ambassador of Sweden to Chad; 1996–2001	Succeeded by Robert Rydberg
Notes and references
1. Zaire ceased to exist in 1997 and became the Democratic Republic of the Congo.
