= List of ambassadors of Sweden to Fiji =

Ambassador of Sweden to Fiji
- Lesser coat of arms of the Kingdom of Sweden

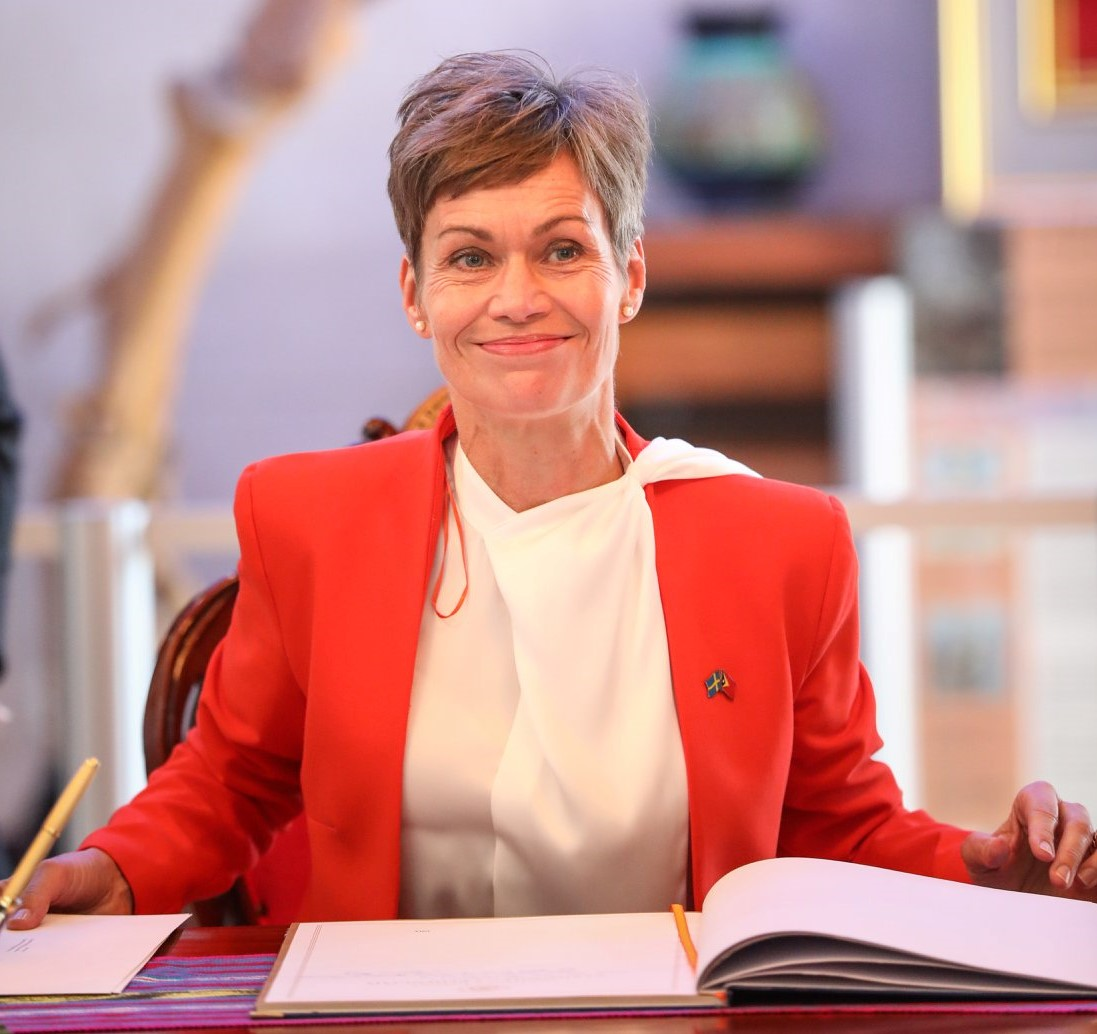
- Incumbent; Marina Berg since 2025
- Ministry for Foreign Affairs
- Style: His or Her Excellency (formal); Mr. or Madam Ambassador (informal)
- Reports to: Minister for Foreign Affairs
- Seat: Stockholm, Sweden (Note: Since 2025, the Swedish ambassador to Fiji is based in Stockholm, Sweden.)
- Appointer: Government of Sweden
- Term length: No fixed term
- Inaugural holder: Gunnar Gerring
- Formation: April 1979

The Ambassador of Sweden to Fiji (known formally as the Ambassador of the Kingdom of Sweden to the Republic of Fiji) is the official representative of the government of Sweden to the president of Fiji and government of Fiji. Since Sweden does not have an embassy in Suva, Sweden's ambassador to Fiji is based in Stockholm, Sweden.

== History ==
Sweden established an honorary consulate in Levuka in 1881, which moved to Suva in 1887, back to Levuka in 1892, and then to Suva again in 1900. In 1922, the Swedish Consul General in Sydney, Australia received an expanded consular district that, in addition to Australia, also included New Zealand and the Fiji Islands. After the consulate general in Sydney was converted into a legation in Canberra in 1947, the district was dissolved. The honorary consulate in Suva (headed by John Maynard Hedstrom since 1913) was now instead subordinate to the legation in Canberra.

Sweden and Fiji established diplomatic relations on 3 April 1979. That same month, Sweden's ambassador in Wellington, New Zealand, Gunnar Gerring, was accredited as ambassador also to Fiji's capital, Suva. Sweden's ambassador to New Zealand remained accredited to Fiji until the embassy in Wellington was closed in 1995. Thereafter, a Stockholm-based ambassador-at-large, who in addition to Fiji was also ambassador to Papua New Guinea, the Solomon Islands, Samoa, Tonga, and Vanuatu, took over. In 2008, responsibility was transferred to the Swedish ambassador to Australia.

As of 2025, the post of Swedish ambassador to Fiji is again held by a Stockholm-based ambassador-at-large, who is also ambassador to 10 other countries in Oceania.

== List of representatives ==
Name	Period	Title	Resident / Concurrent accreditation	Notes	Presented credentials	Ref
Dominion of Fiji (1970–1987)
Gunnar Gerring	April 1979 – 1982	Ambassador	Resident in Wellington			
Christer Sylvén	1982–1987	Ambassador	Resident in Wellington			
Republic of Fiji (1987–present)
Kjell Anneling	1987–1990	Ambassador	Resident in Wellington			
Hans Andén	1991–1993	Ambassador	Resident in Wellington			
Karin Ahrland	1993–1995	Ambassador	Resident in Wellington	Political appointee (non-career diplomat)		
Kaj Falkman	1996–1998	Ambassador	Resident in Stockholm			
–	1999–2001	Ambassador	Vacant			
Göran Hasselmark	2001–2002	Ambassador	Resident in Stockholm			
Greger Widgren	2003–2008	Ambassador	Resident in Stockholm			
Eha Arg	2008–2008	Chargé d'affaires	Resident in Stockholm			
Sven-Olof Petersson	2008–2014	Ambassador	Resident in Canberra			
Pär Ahlberger	2014–2019	Ambassador	Resident in Canberra		16 April 2015	
Henrik Cederin	2022–2022	Ambassador	Resident in Canberra		15 March 2022	
Pontus Melander	2023–2025	Ambassador	Resident in Canberra		26 October 2023	
Marina Berg	2025–present	Ambassador	Resident in Stockholm			
