= Bo Wilén =

Swedish diplomat (1944–2023)

- Born: Bo Lennart Wilén; 5 June 1944; Stockholm, Sweden
- Died: 17 January 2023 (aged 78); Stockholm, Sweden
- Resting place: Sandsborgskyrkogården
- Other name: "Bosse"
- Education: Nya elementarskolan
- Occupation: Diplomat
- Years active: 1968–2008

Bo "Bosse" Lennart Wilén (5 June 1944 – 17 January 2023) was a Swedish diplomat whose career began in development cooperation at SIDA (1970–1977), including postings in Zambia and Tunisia. He joined the Ministry for Foreign Affairs in 1978 and held several diplomatic positions across North Africa, Europe, and West Africa. He served in embassies in Tunis, Algiers, Tripoli, and Stockholm, later becoming embassy counsellor in Rome, where he also represented Sweden at major UN food and agricultural agencies. He then held ambassadorial posts in Ivory Coast, Senegal, and later for Libya and Tunisia, with broad regional responsibilities in West Africa.

== Early life ==
Wilén was born on 5 June 1944 in Stockholm, Sweden, the son of Lennart Wilén, a construction engineer, and his wife Brita (née Gunnarsson). He grew up in Fredhäll on Kungsholmen in Stockholm and completed his upper secondary school diploma at Nya elementarskolan, after which he did his military service at the Swedish Army Riding and Horse-Driving School. He earned a degree in social work and public administration in 1967 and at the time also worked part-time as a tram driver.

== Career ==
Wilén worked as a payroll secretary in Boo Rural Disctrict from 1968 to 1970, and then as an official at the Swedish International Development Cooperation Agency (SIDA) from 1970 to 1977. During this period, he undertook field assignments in Zambia from 1972 to 1974 and in Tunisia from 1974 to 1976. From 1978, he served at the Ministry for Foreign Affairs.

He went on to become first embassy secretary in Tunis (1978–1982), Algiers (1982–1985), Tripoli (1985–1988), and Stockholm (1988–1991). He then served as embassy counsellor in Rome from 1991 to 1996, where he was also Sweden's representative to the Food and Agriculture Organization (FAO), the World Food Programme (WFP), and the International Fund for Agricultural Development (IFAD).

From 1995, he was ambassador to Ivory Coast, with concurrent accreditation to Burkina Faso, Togo, and Benin (1996–1999). He subsequently served as ambassador to Senegal, also accredited to Cape Verde, Guinea, Guinea-Bissau, Mali, and The Gambia (2000–2002). After that, he was based in Stockholm as ambassador for Libya and Tunisia from 2003 to 2008.

== Personal life ==
Wilén had an apartment in La Marsa in northeastern Tunisia, where he often returned. In Stockholm, he lived in the Erlander House in Marieberg on Kungsholmen. Later in life, he moved to a senior residence in Fredhäll, where he had grown up.

Wilén, who had worked part-time as a tram driver when he was young, was a lifelong member of the Swedish Tramway Society.

== Death ==
Wilén died on 17 January 2023 in Stockholm, Sweden. He was interred on 3 August 2023 at Sandsborgskyrkogården in Stockholm.

Diplomatic posts
Preceded by Peter Bruce	Ambassador of Sweden to Ivory Coast; 1995–1999	Succeeded by Göran Ankarberg
Preceded by Peter Bruce	Ambassador of Sweden to Burkina Faso; 1996–1999	Succeeded by Göran Ankarberg
Preceded by Peter Bruce	Ambassador of Sweden to Benin; 1996–1999	Succeeded by Lars Ekström
Preceded by Peter Bruce	Ambassador of Sweden to Togo; 1996–1999	Succeeded by Lars Ekström
Preceded by Nils-Erik Schyberg	Ambassador of Sweden to Senegal; 2000–2002	Succeeded by Annika Magnusson
Preceded by Nils-Erik Schyberg	Ambassador of Sweden to Guinea; 2000–2002	Succeeded by Annika Magnusson
Preceded by Nils-Erik Schyberg	Ambassador of Sweden to Mali; 2000–2002	Succeeded by Annika Magnusson
Preceded by Carl-Erhard Lindahl	Ambassador of Sweden to Cape Verde; 2000–2002	Succeeded by Annika Magnusson
Preceded by Carl-Erhard Lindahl	Ambassador of Sweden to Guinea-Bissau; 2000–2002	Succeeded by Annika Magnusson
Preceded by Annie Marie Sundbom	Ambassador of Sweden to the Gambia; 2000–2002	Succeeded by Annika Magnusson
Preceded by Bengt Sparre	Ambassador of Sweden to Libya; 2003–2008	Succeeded by Anne Marie Dierauer
Preceded by Krister Isaksson	Ambassador of Sweden to Tunisia; 2003–2008	Succeeded by Anne Marie Dierauer
