= List of ambassadors of Sweden to the Solomon Islands =

Ambassador of Sweden to the Solomon Islands
- Lesser coat of arms of the Kingdom of Sweden

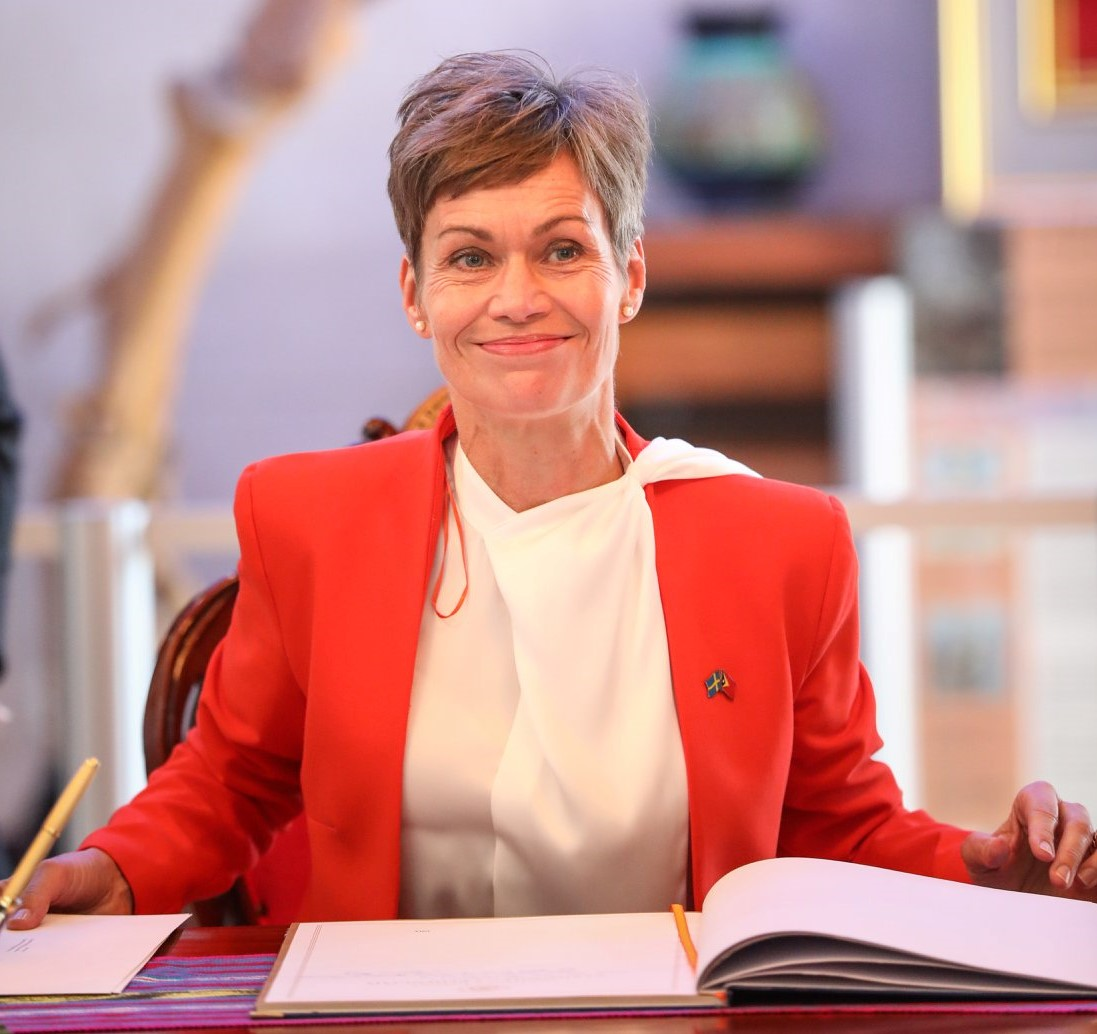
- Incumbent; Marina Berg since 2025
- Ministry for Foreign Affairs
- Style: His or Her Excellency (formal); Mr. or Madam Ambassador (informal)
- Reports to: Minister for Foreign Affairs
- Seat: Stockholm, Sweden (Note: Since 2025, the Swedish ambassador to the Solomon Islands is based in Stockholm, Sweden.)
- Appointer: Government of Sweden
- Term length: No fixed term
- Inaugural holder: Lars Hedström
- Formation: 1979

The Ambassador of Sweden to the Solomon Islands (known formally as the Ambassador of the Kingdom of Sweden to the Solomon Islands) is the official representative of the government of Sweden to the governor-general of Solomon Islands and government of the Solomon Islands. Since Sweden does not have an embassy in Honiara, Sweden's ambassador to the Solomon Islands is based in Stockholm, Sweden.

== History ==
Sweden and the Solomon Islands established diplomatic relations on 24 October 1979. In the same year, Sweden's ambassador in Canberra, Australia, was also accredited to Honiara. The Swedish ambassador to the Solomon Islands has over the years been stationed alternately in Canberra and Stockholm.

Since 2025 the post of Swedish ambassador to the Solomon Islands is again held by a Stockholm-based ambassador-at-large, who is also ambassador to 10 other countries in Oceania.

== List of representatives ==
Name	Period	Title	Resident / Concurrent accreditation	Notes	Presented credentials	Ref
Lars Hedström	1979–1985	Ambassador	Resident in Canberra			
Hans Björk	1986–1990	Ambassador	Resident in Canberra			
Bo Heinebäck	1990–1994	Ambassador	Resident in Canberra			
Göran Hasselmark	1994–1995	Ambassador	Resident in Canberra			
Kaj Falkman	1996–1998	Ambassador	Resident in Stockholm			
–	1999–2000	Ambassador		Vacant		
Göran Hasselmark	2001–2002	Ambassador	Resident in Stockholm			
Greger Widgren	2003–2008	Ambassador	Resident in Stockholm			
Sven-Olof Petersson	2008–2014	Ambassador	Resident in Canberra			
Pär Ahlberger	2014–2019	Ambassador	Resident in Canberra			
?	2019–2025	Ambassador				
Marina Berg	2025–present	Ambassador	Resident in Stockholm		17 February 2026	
