= Karin Ahrland =

Swedish politician (1931–2019)

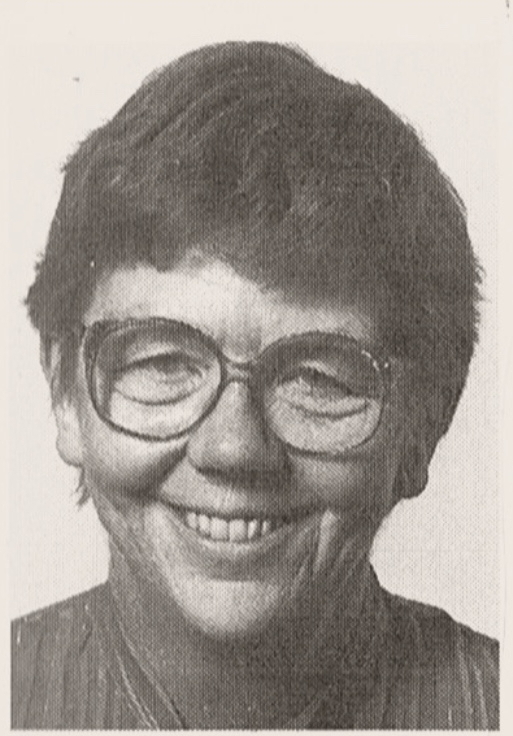
- Ahrland in 1970

Ambassador of Sweden to New Zealand
- In office 1993–1995
- Preceded by: Hans Andén
- Succeeded by: Göran Hasselmark

Consul-general of Sweden to Montreal
- In office 1990–1993
- Preceded by: Bengt Rösiö
- Succeeded by: None

Chairman of the Committee on Justice
- In office 1985–1989
- Preceded by: Bertil Lidgard
- Succeeded by: Britta Bjelle

Minister of Health
- In office 1981–1982
- Prime Minister: Thorbjörn Fälldin
- Preceded by: Elisabet Holm
- Succeeded by: Gertrud Sigurdsen

Personal details
- Born: Karin Margareta Andersson; 20 July 1931 Torshälla, Sweden
- Died: 30 August 2019 (aged 88) Brösarp, Sweden
- Party: Liberal People's Party
- Spouse(s): Hans F Petersson (m. 1958; div. 1962) Nils Ahrland (m. 1964; died 2009)
- Children: 3
- Education: Lund University
- Occupation: Jurist, politician, diplomat

Karin Margareta Ahrland, née Andersson (20 July 1931 – 30 August 2019) was a Swedish politician, diplomat, lawyer, and activist. She was a member of parliament from 1976 to 1989. She began as a trained lawyer after earning her law degree in 1958, working in courts and county administrative boards, and later serving in the Supreme Administrative Court. Throughout the 1960s and 1970s, she built a strong legal-administrative career within Swedish public administration.

Ahrland then moved into politics, serving as a member of the Swedish Parliament from 1976 to 1989. During this time, she held influential roles in several key committees, particularly in justice, taxation, and constitutional matters, and chaired the Committee on Justice from 1985 to 1989. She also served as minister of health from 1981 to 1982.

After leaving parliament, she transitioned into diplomacy. She held positions within the Ministry for Foreign Affairs, served as consul general in Montreal, and later became ambassador to New Zealand, with additional accreditation to several Pacific nations. She concluded her diplomatic career as Marshal of the Diplomatic Corps.

In parallel with her public roles, Ahrland was deeply engaged in civil society, international organizations, and business. She was active in women's rights advocacy, including leadership roles in national and international organizations, and represented Sweden in the United Nations, particularly on issues related to gender equality. She also served on numerous government committees, public boards, and corporate boards, contributing to policy development in areas such as equality, culture, taxation, and citizenship.

== Early life ==
Ahrland was born on 20 July 1931 in Nyby bruk in Torshälla Parish, Södermanland County, Sweden, the daughter of Valfrid Andersson, and his wife Greta (née Myhlén). She received a Candidate of Law degree from Lund University in 1958.

== Career ==
=== Early legal career ===
Ahrland began her professional career with judicial training at the Färs Judicial District (1958–1961). She then worked at the Helsingborg City Court (Helsingborgs rådhusrätt) in 1961 and at the County Administrative Board of Malmöhus County from 1961 to 1964.

From 1964 to 1968, she served as a reporting clerk and secretary at the Supreme Administrative Court. She continued her legal-administrative career as a senior administrative officer in County Administrative Board of Kopparberg County (1968–1971) and later in Malmöhus County (1971–1989).

=== Political and parliamentary career ===
Ahrland was elected as a member of the Swedish Parliament, serving from 3 October 1976, to 29 September 1989. During this period, she held key roles in several parliamentary committees. She was a member of the Committee on Taxation (1976–1979), the Committee on Civil Affairs (1978–1981), the Committee on the Constitution (1982–1985), and the Committee on Justice (1985–1989), where she also served as chair from 1985 to 1989.

She also served as a substitute member in the Committee on Civil-Law Legislation, the Committee on Taxation, and the Committee on Transport and Communications. In addition, she was involved in parliamentary bodies such as the National Debt Office's Board, the Nominating Committee, and the Speaker's Conference. She participated in the 1983 Parliamentary Ombudsman inquiry and served on the Liberal People's Party parliamentary group's council of confidence during several terms.

Parallel to her parliamentary work, Ahrland was appointed minister of health at the Ministry of Health and Social Affairs, serving from 22 May 1981, to 8 October 1982.

=== Diplomatic dareer ===
After leaving parliament, Ahrland transitioned into diplomacy. She served as ambassador in the Ministry for Foreign Affairs' trade department (1989–1990), followed by her role as consul general in Montreal (1990–1993). She was later appointed ambassador to New Zealand, with concurrent accreditation to the Cook Islands, Fiji, Tonga, and Western Samoa (1993–1995). She later served as Marshal of the Diplomatic Corps (Introduktör av främmande sändebud) from 1996 to 2001.

=== Roles in organizations and business ===
Alongside her public service, Ahrland was active in civil society and business. She served as chair of the Fredrika Bremer Association (1970–1976) and co-editor of its journal Hertha. She was also involved in the International Alliance of Women (1973–1985).

Her business engagements included board memberships in the Skandinaviska Enskilda Banken's Malmö branch (1974–1981, 1983–1989), AB Wilh. Sonesson (1976–1981), and Trygg-Hansa (1976–1981). She also chaired the Swedish Committee for Afghanistan (1986–1989).

Within the Liberal People's Party, she served as chair of the Malmöhus County branch (1979–1983) and was a member of the party's national board (1978–1990).

=== Government agencies and public committees ===
Throughout her career, Ahrland held numerous roles in government agencies and public commissions. She served on the Swedish Council for Building Research (1980–1981) and chaired the National Swedish Arts Council (1980–1981). She was also a member of the Swedish Arts Council (1983–1986), the Public Sector Special Board (Offentliga sektorns särskilda nämnd), the Swedish Arts Grants Committee, and the Swedish Visual Artists' Fund (Sveriges Bildkonstnärsfond), where she served as chair (1988–1990).

She was a board member of the National Tax Board (1987–1989) and the Swedish Institute Foundation (from 1992). Internationally, she was member of the United Nations Commission on the Status of Women between 1976 and 1979,, represented Sweden as a United Nations delegate in 1983 and 1985 and served as vice chair at the UN World Conferences on Women in Copenhagen (1980) and Nairobi (1985).

Her extensive committee work included participation in major national inquiries such as the Foundations Inquiry (1975–1980), the Equality Committee (vice chair 1976–1979, chair 1979–1981), the Citizenship Committees (1985–1989 and 1997–1999), and other investigations concerning pensions, voting rights, narcotics policy, and citizenship law. She was also a contributor to Svenska Dagbladet and Sydsvenska Dagbladet and several other newspapers.

== Personal life ==
In 1958, she married the professor of political science Hans Fredrik Petersson (1924–2009). They divorced in 1962. In 1964, she married defence director Nils Harald Ahrland (1924–2009), the son of Harald Ahrland and Märtha (née Ljunggren).

== Death ==
Ahrland died on 30 August 2019 in Illstorp in Brösarp, Sweden. The funeral service took place on 27 September 2019 in Trons Chapel (Trons kapell) in Limhamn. She was interred on 30 October 2019 in the memorial grove at the Old Cemetery in Malmö.

== Awards and decorations ==
- (Sweden) Member of the Order of the Polar Star (1 December 1973)

== Bibliography ==
- Rausing, Hans; Ahrland, Karin, eds. (1996). En kreatörs tankevärld: en vänbok till Hans Rausing [A Creator's Thought World: A Companion to Hans Rausing] (in Swedish). Stockholm: Ekerlid. ISBN 9188594688. SELIBR 7773396.
- Ahrland, Karin; Wibble, Anne, eds. (1988). Damerna först: en rapport om kvinnor och ekonomi [Ladies First: A Report on Women and the Economy]. Folkpartiet informerar, 0349-1617 ; 1988:15 (in Swedish). Stockholm: Folkpartiet. SELIBR 757929.
- Lagerkvist, Magnus; Ahrland, Karin, eds. (1979). Sverige utan hopp?: nio liberaler om framtiden [Sweden without hope?: nine liberals on the future]. En PAN-bok, 99-0104304-2 (in Swedish). Stockholm: PAN/Norstedt. ISBN 9117931711. SELIBR 7153003.
- Ahrland, Karin (1973). A woman's place is on the job. [S.l.]: Swedish Institute. SELIBR 17611487.
- Ahrland, Karin (1973). La mujer sueca en la vida laboral [Swedish women in the workplace] (in Spanish). [S.l.]: Instituto Sueco. SELIBR 17611443.
- Ahrland, Karin (1973). La situation des femmes suedoises sur le march du travail [The situation of Swedish women in the labor market] (in French). [S.l.] : Institut Suédois. SELIBR 17611480.
- Ahrland, Karin (1973). Die Stellung der schwedischen Frauen auf dem Arbeitsmarkt: Aktuelle Informationen aus Schweden [The position of Swedish women in the labor market: Current information from Sweden] (in German). [S.l.]: Schwedischen Institut. SELIBR 17605994.

Government offices
Preceded by Elisabet Holm	Minister of Health; 1981–1982	Succeeded by Gertrud Sigurdsen
Preceded by Bertil Lidgard	Chairman of the Committee on Justice; 1985–1989	Succeeded by Britta Bjelle
Diplomatic posts
Preceded by Bengt Rösiö	Consul-general of Sweden to Montreal; 1990–1993	Succeeded by None
Preceded by Hans Andén	Ambassador of Sweden to New Zealand; 1993–1995	Succeeded by Göran Hasselmark
Preceded by Hans Andén	Ambassador of Sweden to Fiji; 1993–1995	Succeeded by Kaj Falkman
Preceded by Hans Andén	Ambassador of Sweden to Samoa; 1993–1995	Succeeded by Kaj Falkman
Preceded by Hans Andén	Ambassador of Sweden to Tonga; 1993–1995	Succeeded by Kaj Falkman
Preceded by Hans Andén	Ambassador of Sweden to Cook Islands; 1993–1995	Succeeded by Göran Hasselmark¹
Notes and references
1. Spiegelberg (1999), p. 174 states that Göran Hasselmark was accredited to the Cook Islands (from Australia) while the same source p. 177 states that the post was vacant.
