= Kim E. Nielsen =

American academic historian and author who specializes in disability studies

- Education: Macalester College (BA); University of Iowa (MA, PhD)
- Occupations: Historian and author
- Writing career
- Genre: Disability studies

Kim E. Nielsen is an American historian and author who specializes in disability studies. Since 2012, Nielsen has been a professor of history, disability studies, and women's studies at the University of Toledo. Nielsen originally trained as historian of women and politics, and came to disability history and studies via her discovery of Helen Keller's political life.

== Early life and education ==
Nielsen grew up largely in Northern Minnesota. She earned a BA from Macalester College in 1988, and from the University of Iowa an MA in 1991 and a PhD in 1996. At Macalester she was mentored by Peter Rachleff, and her thesis advisor at Iowa was Linda Kerber.

== Career ==
For fourteen years, until 2012, she was a professor of Democracy and Justice Studies at the University of Wisconsin–Green Bay. Nielsen has written biographies of Helen Keller and Anne Sullivan Macy, and participated as an on-screen expert in the American Masters episode, "Becoming Helen Keller" (2021).

She was the founding president of the Disability History Association, and her book A Disability History of the United States (2012) was described as "the first broad survey of its topic and the first work to lay out a complete periodization of American disability history".

Filmmaker John Gianvito called The Radical Lives of Helen Keller "the best of the biographies" in a 2020 interview. A 2021 essay in The New York Times calls The Radical Lives of Helen Keller "a revelation". In "Disability History, Power, and Rethinking the Idea of 'The Other'" (2005), historian Catherine Kudlick notes that "Unlike earlier biographers, Nielsen places Keller's life in the context of major trends in American history ... to understand her and her disability as rich and complex rather than as a feel-good caricature of one inspirational person."

== Awards and honors ==
Nielsen has received honors from the Organization of American Historians (OAH) and the Southern Association for Women Historians (SAWH). The SAWH awarded her the 2007 Elizabeth Taylor Prize for the best article in southern women's history. In 1998, she was a Fulbright Scholar in Iceland, and in 2005 held an OAH Lectureship in Japan.

She is the winner of the 2021 Rosen Prize of the American Association for the History of Medicine for The Oxford Handbook of Disability History, co-edited with Michael Rembis and Catherine J. Kudlick. The book also won the 2019 Disability History Association Book Award.

== Published works ==
- Nielsen, Kim E. (2001). Un-American womanhood : antiradicalism, antifeminism, and the first Red Scare. Columbus: Ohio State University Press. ISBN 978-0-8142-5080-8.
- Nielsen, Kim E. (2004). The radical lives of Helen Keller. New York: New York University Press. ISBN 978-0-8147-5814-4.
- Nielsen, Kim E., ed. (2005). Helen Keller : selected writings. New York: New York University Press. ISBN 978-0-8147-5829-8.
- Nielsen, Kim E. (2009). Beyond the miracle worker : the remarkable life of Anne Sullivan Macy and her extraordinary friendship with Helen Keller. Boston: Beacon Press. ISBN 978-0-8070-5050-7.
- Nielsen, Kim E. (2012). A disability history of the United States. Boston: Beacon Press. ISBN 978-0-8070-2204-7.
- Rembis, Michael; Kudlick, Catherine; Nielsen, Kim E., eds. (2018). The Oxford handbook of disability history. New York, NY: Oxford University Press. ISBN 978-0-19-023495-9.
- Nielsen, Kim E. (2020). Money, Marriage, and Madness: The Life of Anna Ott. University of Illinois Press. ISBN 978-0252043147.

With Michael Rembis, Nielsen co-edits Disability Histories, a book series published by the University of Illinois Press. The series explores the lived experiences of individuals and groups from a broad range of societies, cultures, time periods, and geographic locations, who either identified as disabled or were considered by the dominant culture to be disabled.

From 2015 to 2018 she coedited the Disability Studies Quarterly with Allyson Day.
