= List of ambassadors of Sweden to São Tomé and Príncipe =

Ambassador of Sweden to São Tomé and Príncipe
- Lesser coat of arms of the Kingdom of Sweden
- Incumbent; Elisabeth Eklund since 2022
- Ministry for Foreign Affairs
- Style: His or Her Excellency (formal); Mr. or Madam Ambassador (informal)
- Reports to: Minister for Foreign Affairs
- Seat: Lisbon, Portugal (Note: The Swedish ambassador to São Tomé and Príncipe is based in Lisbon, Portugal.)
- Appointer: Government of Sweden
- Term length: No fixed term
- Inaugural holder: Kaj Falkman
- Formation: 1977

The Ambassador of Sweden to São Tomé and Príncipe (known formally as the Ambassador of the Kingdom of Sweden to the Democratic Republic of São Tomé and Príncipe) is the official representative of the government of Sweden to the president of São Tomé and Príncipe and government of São Tomé and Príncipe. Since Sweden does not have an embassy in São Tomé, Sweden's ambassador to São Tomé and Príncipe is based in Lisbon, Portugal.

== History ==
On 12 July 1975, Sweden recognized the newly established Democratic Republic of São Tomé and Príncipe. The decision was communicated by Foreign Minister Sven Andersson in a telegram to the island nation's president, Manuel Pinto da Costa, on the same day.

In 1977, Kaj Falkman was appointed Sweden's first ambassador to São Tomé. From 1977 to 2008, Sweden's ambassador in Luanda, Angola, was also accredited to São Tomé. In 2008, responsibility was transferred to the Swedish ambassador in Lisbon, Portugal, who became accredited to São Tomé.

== List of representatives ==
Name	Period	Title	Notes	Presented credentials	Ref
Kaj Falkman	1977–1978	Ambassador	Resident in Luanda.		
Göte Magnusson	1978–1981	Ambassador	Resident in Luanda.		
Leif Sjöström	1982–1985	Ambassador	Resident in Luanda.		
Sten Rylander	1985–1988	Ambassador	Resident in Luanda.		
Per Lindström	1988–1992	Ambassador	Resident in Luanda.		
Anders Möllander	1993–1995	Ambassador	Resident in Luanda.		
Lena Sundh	1996–2000	Ambassador	Resident in Luanda.		
Roger Gartoft	2000–2003	Ambassador	Resident in Luanda.		
Anders Hagelberg	2003–2006	Ambassador	Resident in Luanda.		
Erik Åberg	2006–2008	Ambassador	Resident in Luanda. (Note: Responsibility for São Tomé and Príncipe was transferred to the Swedish Embassy in Lisbon in 2008.)		
Bengt Lundborg	2008–2012	Ambassador	Resident in Lisbon.		
?	2012–2022	Ambassador			
Elisabeth Eklund	2022–present	Ambassador	Resident in Lisbon.	6 December 2023	
