= List of ambassadors of Sweden to Chad =

Ambassador of Sweden to Chad
- Lesser coat of arms of the Kingdom of Sweden
- Ministry for Foreign Affairs; Swedish Embassy, Kampala
- Style: His or Her Excellency (formal); Mr. or Madam Ambassador (informal)
- Reports to: Minister for Foreign Affairs
- Seat: Kampala, Uganda (Note: The Swedish ambassador in Kampala, Uganda is also accredited in N'Djamena.)
- Appointer: Government of Sweden
- Term length: No fixed term
- Formation: 18 January 1996
- First holder: Carl-Erhard Lindahl

The Ambassador of Sweden to Chad (known formally as the Ambassador of the Kingdom of Sweden to the Republic of Chad) is the official representative of the government of Sweden to the president of Chad and government of Chad. Since Sweden does not have an embassy in N'Djamena, Sweden's ambassador in Kampala, Uganda, is also accredited to N'Djamena, the capital of Chad.

== History ==
On the occasion of the Republic of Chad's declaration of independence on 11 August 1960, Acting Minister for Foreign Affairs Ragnar Edenman stated in a congratulatory telegram to president and Head of Government François Tombalbaye that the Swedish government recognizes the Republic of Chad as a sovereign and independent state. The Swedish government expressed its hopes for friendly and cordial relations between the two countries. At the same time, congratulatory telegrams had been sent from the King of Sweden as well.

The Swedish government decided on 17 August 1995, with effect from 3 August 1995, to enter into an agreement with Chad to establish diplomatic relations. The agreement entered into force on 11 August 1995. It was signed on 3 August 1995 in Berlin by the Swedish Ambassador Örjan Berner and the Chadian Ambassador MBailaou Naibaye Lossimia.

On 18 January 1996, Carl-Erhard Lindahl was appointed Sweden's first ambassador to Chad. The post was a Stockholm-based ambassador-at-large position, and in addition to Chad he also served as ambassador to eight other African nations. Since 2002, Sweden's ambassador to Chad has been accredited from another nearby African country.

== List of representatives ==
Name	Period	Title	Resident / Concurrent accreditation	Notes	Presented credentials	Ref
Carl-Erhard Lindahl	18 January 1996 – 2001	Ambassador	Resident in Stockholm			
Robert Rydberg	2002–2003	Ambassador	Resident in Kinshasa			
Magnus Wemstedt	2004–2007	Ambassador	Resident in Kinshasa			
–	2008–2008	Ambassador		Vacant		
Johan Borgstam	2009–2011	Ambassador	Resident in Kinshasa			
?	2011–2013	Ambassador				
Mette Sunnergren	2013–2016	Ambassador	Resident in Khartoum		11 February 2015	
Per Lindgärde	2016–2021	Ambassador	Resident in Kampala		20 April 2018	
Maria Håkansson	2021–2026	Ambassador	Resident in Kampala		2 October 2025	
