= Sten Rylander =

Swedish diplomat (born 1944)

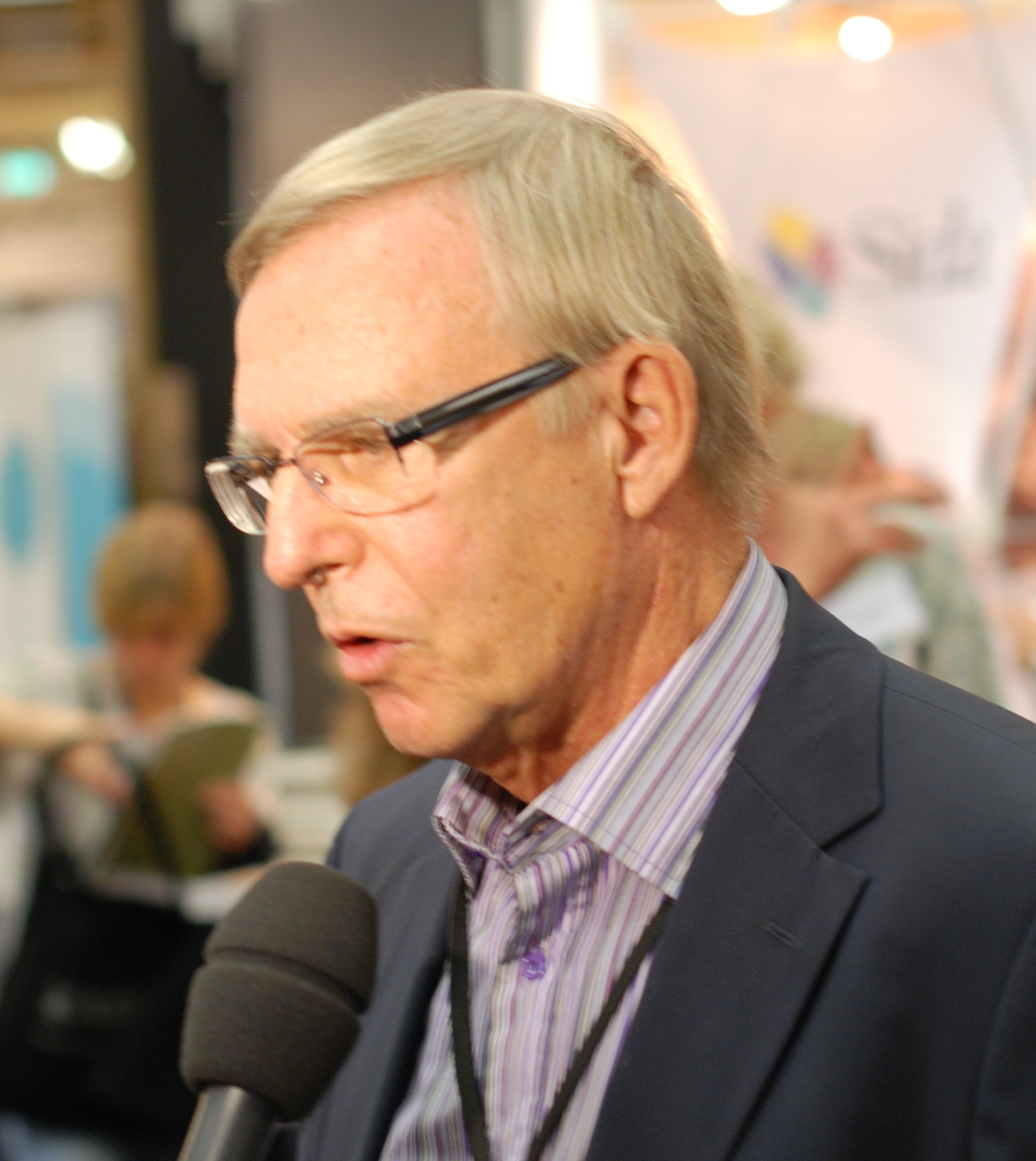
- Rylander in September 2010
- Born: Sten Johan Germund Olovsson Rylander; 28 February 1944 (age 82); Västerås, Sweden
- Education: Lundellska läroverket
- Alma mater: Uppsala University
- Occupation: Diplomat
- Years active: 1970–2011
- Spouse: Berit Andersson (m. 1967)
- Children: 2

Sten Johan Germund Olovsson Rylander (born 28 February 1944) is a retired Swedish diplomat with over 40 years of experience in foreign service and development work, particularly in Africa. He joined the Swedish Ministry for Foreign Affairs in 1970, holding postings at the World Bank in Washington, D.C., and the Swedish OECD delegation in Paris before focusing on Southern Africa. In 1979, he became country director for Sida in Botswana and Lesotho, establishing close contacts with the African National Congress (ANC) and participating in sensitive support activities during the liberation struggles. He later served as Swedish ambassador to Angola (1985–1988), where he engaged with both the ANC and SWAPO, followed by senior roles in Stockholm overseeing bilateral development cooperation.

Rylander was appointed Sweden's first ambassador to independent Namibia in 1990, playing a key role in supporting the country's transition and bilateral relations. He subsequently served as ambassador to Tanzania (1998–2003), roving ambassador for Africa (2003–2006), and ambassador to Zimbabwe (2006–2010), with concurrent accreditation to several other African countries. He also represented the European Union in the War in Darfur (2004–2005) and headed Sida's Africa Department.

After retiring in 2011, Rylander chaired Forum Syd (2013–2015) and authored several books on Africa, including Nelson Mandela (2012), Africa is Turning (2014), and African Meetings (2016), drawing on his diplomatic experience to provide insight into African developments and field diplomacy.

== Early life ==
Rylander was born on 28 February 1944 in Västerås, Sweden, the son of County Governor Olov Rylander (1900–1988) and his wife Britta (née Schröder). He completed his secondary education at Lundellska läroverket in Uppsala on 2 May 1963. He received a Candidate of Law degree from Uppsala University in March 1969.

Rylander's interest in global justice and liberation movements began early. Together with his wife, Berit, he was actively involved in solidarity movements in Sweden during the late 1960s and early 1970s. Initially engaged in the Vietnam solidarity movement, he later turned his focus to Africa, developing a lasting commitment that would shape his entire career.

== Career ==
Rylander joined the Swedish Ministry for Foreign Affairs in 1970, where he worked in various roles for nearly a decade. During this period, he held international postings at the Nordic Office of the World Bank in Washington, D.C. (1972–1974) and at the Swedish OECD delegation in Paris (1974–1976). Despite these assignments, he sought closer engagement with the realities of developing regions, particularly Southern Africa. In 1979, Rylander became the country director for the Swedish International Development Cooperation Agency (Sida) in Botswana and Lesotho, marking the beginning of his direct involvement in the region. There, he established close contacts with members of the African National Congress (ANC), who were operating in exile under difficult and often dangerous conditions. His work went beyond formal diplomacy; he participated in sensitive support activities and developed personal relationships with key figures in the liberation struggle, including Chris Hani. During this period, he was involved in discreet operations such as delivering financial support and facilitating dialogue between liberation movements and Western actors.

After returning to Stockholm in the early 1980s, Rylander continued to work on Southern African issues within the Ministry for Foreign Affairs, having been appointed deputy director (kansliråd) in the Department for Development Cooperation (u-avdelningen) in 1982. In 1985, he was appointed Swedish ambassador to Angola, with concurrent accreditation to São Tomé and Príncipe, where he served during a particularly volatile phase of the country's civil war. Angola was then a central hub for both the ANC and SWAPO (South West Africa People's Organization), and Rylander maintained close contact with both movements. His residence became an informal meeting place for political discussions, including debates among prominent ANC leaders such as Joe Slovo. These interactions gave him unique insight into ideological divisions and evolving strategies within the liberation movements.

Following his time in Angola, Rylander returned to Stockholm as director (departementsråd) responsible for bilateral development cooperation between 1988 and 1990. In this role, he remained closely engaged with the processes leading to Namibia's independence. He contributed to preparations for state-building, including institutional development and facilitating dialogue between SWAPO leaders and various international actors. In 1990, Rylander was appointed Sweden's first ambassador to an independent Namibia. This period was a defining moment in his career. Thanks to Sweden's long-standing support for SWAPO, he enjoyed exceptional access to the country's leadership and played an important role in strengthening bilateral relations and supporting development efforts. His tenure coincided with Namibia's transition to independence and nation-building, where trust and diplomacy were crucial.

After returning to Sweden in 1995, Rylander took on senior roles within Sida, eventually heading the Africa Department. From 1998 to 2003, he served as ambassador to Tanzania, with concurrent accreditation to Madagascar from 1999 to 2003, continuing his engagement in African development and diplomacy. From 2003 to 2006, he served as a roving ambassador responsible for dialogue with African countries, further consolidating Sweden's relationships across the continent. Rylander also contributed to international conflict resolution efforts, serving as the European Union's representative in the War in Darfur in Sudan from 2004 to 2005. He later took up the position of Swedish ambassador to Zimbabwe (2006–2010), continuing his long-standing involvement in Southern Africa. He was concurrently accredited to Malawi and Mauritius. Rylander retired in 2011.

From 2013 to 2015, he served as chairman of Forum Syd, an umbrella organization that, among other things, channels Swedish development aid from Sida to civil society organizations operating in developing countries. He authored Nelson Mandela (2012), Africa is turning (2014), and African Meetings (2016) which recounted his experiences in Africa. Drawing on meetings with leaders and informal encounters, it offers insight into field diplomacy and highlights the continent's rapid changes and potential for a more optimistic view.

== Personal life ==
In 1967, Rylander married senior administrative officer (byrådirektör) Berit Andersson (born 1946), the daughter of baker Erik Andersson and nurse Gunhild (née Tillenius). They have two children.

== Bibliography ==
- Rylander, Sten (2020). Afrikanska möten [African Meetings] (in Swedish). Lund: Historiska Media. ISBN 9789177891932. SELIBR 9mqjspvg7p6rkwx6.
- Rylander, Sten (2016). Afrikanska möten [African Meetings] (in Swedish). Lund: Historiska media. ISBN 9789175452876. SELIBR 18546238.
- Rylander, Sten (2020). Afrika vänder: en kontinent i förändring [Africa is Turning: a continent in transition] (in Swedish). Lund: Historiska media. ISBN 9789177891925. SELIBR 8lpqvc536lhmrkmg.
- Rylander, Sten (2015). Afrika vänder: en kontinent i förändring [Africa is Turning: a continent in transition] (in Swedish) (New ed.). Lund: Historiska Media. ISBN 9789175452838. SELIBR 17554418.
- Rylander, Sten (2014). Afrika vänder: en kontinent i förändring [Africa is Turning: a continent in transition] (in Swedish). Lund: Historiska media. ISBN 9789175450940. SELIBR 14739884.
- Rylander, Sten (2012). Nelson Mandela: tolerans och ledarskap [Nelson Mandela: tolerance and leadership] (in Swedish). Lund: Historiska media. ISBN 9789186297879. SELIBR 12345709.

Diplomatic posts
Preceded by Leif Sjöström	Ambassador of Sweden to Angola; 1985–1988	Succeeded by Per Lindström
Preceded by Leif Sjöström	Ambassador of Sweden to São Tomé and Príncipe; 1985–1988	Succeeded by Per Lindström
Preceded by None	Ambassador of Sweden to Namibia; 1990–1995	Succeeded by Ulla Ström
Preceded by Thomas Palme	Ambassador of Sweden to Tanzania; 1998–2003	Succeeded by Torvald Åkesson
Preceded by Krister Göranson	Ambassador of Sweden to Madagascar; 1999–2003	Succeeded by Torvald Åkesson
Preceded by Kristina Svensson	Ambassador of Sweden to Zimbabwe; 2006–2010	Succeeded by Anders Lidén
Preceded by Kristina Svensson	Ambassador of Sweden to Malawi; 2006–2010	Succeeded by Anders Lidén
Preceded by Kristina Svensson	Ambassador of Sweden to Mauritius; 2006–2010	Succeeded by Anders Lidén
