= Kaj Falkman =

Swedish diplomat

- Born: 1 February 1934; Copenhagen, Denmark
- Died: 4 June 2018 (aged 84); Stockholm, Sweden
- Occupation: Diplomat
- Years active: 1959–2001
- Spouse: Sigrid Bylund (m. 1977)
- Children: 1

Kaj Falkman (1 February 1934 – 4 June 2018) was a Swedish diplomat and author. Falkman began his career as an attaché at the Swedish Ministry for Foreign Affairs in 1959, serving in various international posts, including Tokyo, London, and Hanoi. He held several key diplomatic roles, such as Sweden's first ambassador to Luanda and Consul General in Istanbul. From 1995 to 1998, he served as a Stockholm-based ambassador to several Pacific island nations and was a special envoy for the Cyprus problem. Outside of diplomacy, Falkman founded the Swedish Haiku Society in 1999, leading it until 2015, and was involved with the Swedish-Japanese Society.

== Early life ==
Falkman was born on 1 February 1934 in Copenhagen, Denmark, the son of Consul General Patrik Falkman and his wife Hanna (née Nilsson). He received a Candidate of Law degree in 1959.

== Career ==
Falkman was employed as an attaché at the Ministry for Foreign Affairs in Stockholm in 1959. He served in Tokyo in 1959, at the Ministry for Foreign Affairs in 1961, and as first secretary at the Embassy in London in 1964. Falkman became a desk officer (departementssekreterare) at the Ministry for Foreign Affairs in 1968 and served as chargé d'affaires ad interim in Hanoi in 1971, as well as serving at the Ministry for Foreign Affairs in 1971. In 1973, he represented the Swedish delegation at the Conference on Security and Co-operation in Europe in Geneva. Falkman was first secretary at the Embassy in Lisbon in 1974 and was appointed Sweden's first ambassador in Luanda in 1976, with additional accreditation to São Tomé from 1977.

Falkman had a special assignment at the Ministry for Foreign Affairs in 1978 and served as a minister in Tokyo from 1980 to 1984. He was a visiting researcher at the Swedish Institute of International Affairs from 1985 to 1986 and a fellow at the Center for International Affairs at Harvard University from 1986 to 1987. Falkman had a special assignment at the Ministry for Foreign Affairs in 1988 and was then Consul General in Istanbul from 1990 to 1995. He was a Stockholm-based ambassador-at-large for Fiji, Papua New Guinea, Solomon Islands, Tonga, Vanuatu, and Western Samoa/Samoa from 1995 to 1998. He was a special envoy for the Cyprus problem from 1996 to 2001.

Falkman founded the Swedish Haiku Society (Svenska haikusällskapet) in 1999 and served as its chairman from 1999 to 2015. He was also the chairman of the Swedish-Japanese Society (Svensk-japanska sällskapet). Falkman was a member of the jury for the Cikada Prize.

== Personal life ==
In May 1967, Falkman became engaged to Viviann Kempe, the daughter of director Stig Kempe and his wife Ann (née Channer).

In 1977, Falkman married Sigrid Bylund (born 1947), the daughter of managing director Alvar Bylund and his wife Gun. He had a son named Carl.

== Death ==
Falkman died on 4 June 2018. The burial took place among close family. A memorial service was held at Eric Ericsonhallen in Skeppsholmen Church in Stockholm on 6 August 2018. He was interred on 6 August 2018 at Norra begravningsplatsen outside Stockholm.

== Awards ==
- (Portugal) Commander of the Order of Prince Henry (8 January 1981)

== Bibliography ==
- Falkman, Kaj (2010). Den japanska hemligheten: [roman] (in Swedish). Stockholm: Langenskiöld. ISBN 978-91-86469-02-3. LIBRIS: 11812708.
- Falkman, Kaj (2010). Varför skrattar människan?: kollisioner i hjärnan (in Swedish). Stockholm: Carlsson. ISBN 9789173313476. LIBRIS: 11823681.
- Michiko; Falkman, Kaj; Thunman, Noriko (2008). Strömdrag: [dikter (in Swedish). Stockholm: Atlantis. ISBN 9789173532655. LIBRIS: 11221958.
- Falkman, Kaj, ed. (2008). Plikten och äventyret: upplevelser av diplomati (in Swedish). Stockholm: Carlsson. ISBN 978-91-7331-198-4. LIBRIS: 10864626.
- European Haiku Conference; Falkman, Kaj; Vilén, Florence; Härle, Helga (2007). Haiku in Vadstena: summary of the international haiku conference in Sweden 8-10 June 2007 (in Swedish). Saltsjö-Boo: Svenska Haiku Sällskapet. ISBN 978-91-633-1513-8. LIBRIS: 10902801.
- Falkman, Kaj, ed. (2005). Ringar efter orden: femton röster kring Dag Hammarskjölds Vägmärken (in Swedish). Lund: Ellerström. ISBN 91-7247-130-1. LIBRIS: 9901129.
- Hammarskjöld, Dag; Falkman, Kaj; Åhman, Sven (2005). Att föra världens talan: tal och uttalanden (in Swedish). Stockholm: Atlantis. ISBN 91-7353-062-X. LIBRIS: 9822700.
- Falkman, Kaj (1999). Turkiet - gränsfursten: utsikter från Svenska palatset i Istanbul (in Swedish). Stockholm: Atlantis. ISBN 91-7486-777-6. LIBRIS: 7644722.
- Falkman, Kaj (2011). Överraskningens poesi: upplevelser av haiku (in Swedish). Stockholm: Atlantis. ISBN 978-91-7353-462-8. LIBRIS: 12142626.
- Falkman, Kaj; Hammarskjöld, Dag (2005). En orörd sträng: Dag Hammarskjölds liv i haiku och fotografier (in Swedish). Stockholm: Ordfront. ISBN 91-7037-182-2. LIBRIS: 9840386.
- Falkman, Kaj, ed. (1986). Vårregnets berättelse: japansk haiku (in Swedish). Stockholm: Legenda. ISBN 91-582-0933-6. LIBRIS: 7437844.
- Falkman, Kaj (1985). Japans ansikte: möten med en annan verklighet (in Swedish). Stockholm: Atlantis. ISBN 91-7486-399-1. LIBRIS: 7644538.
- Falkman, Kaj (1981). Orden och bergen (in Swedish). Stockholm: Atlantis. ISBN 91-7486-196-4. LIBRIS: 7644370.
- Falkman, Kaj (1976). Picasso och hjärnan (in Swedish). Stockholm: Forum. ISBN 91-37-06229-8. LIBRIS: 7254206.
- Falkman, Kaj (1974). Roboten och meningen (in Swedish). Staffanstorp: Cavefors. ISBN 91-504-0336-2. LIBRIS: 7401830.
- Falkman, Kaj (1972). Kurirsäcken: handboja och färdbiljett (in Swedish). Staffanstorp: Cavefors. ISBN 91-504-0312-5. LIBRIS: 7401814.

Diplomatic posts
| Preceded by None | Ambassador of Sweden to Angola; 1976–1978 | Succeeded by Göte Magnusson |
| Preceded by None | Ambassador of Sweden to São Tomé and Príncipe; 1977–1978 | Succeeded by Göte Magnusson |
| Preceded by Nils-Urban Allard | Consul General of Sweden to Istanbul; 1990–1995 | Succeeded by Ingemar Börjesson |
| Preceded by Karin Ahrland | Ambassador of Sweden to Tonga; 1995–1998 | Succeeded by Göran Hasselmark |
| Preceded by Karin Ahrland | Ambassador of Sweden to Fiji; 1996–1998 | Succeeded by Göran Hasselmark |
| Preceded by Bo Heinebäck | Ambassador of Sweden to the Papua New Guinea; 1996–1998 | Succeeded by Göran Hasselmark |
| Preceded by Göran Hasselmark | Ambassador of Sweden to the Solomon Islands; 1996–1998 | Succeeded by Göran Hasselmark |
| Preceded by Bo Heinebäck | Ambassador of Sweden to Vanuatu; 1996–1998 | Succeeded by Göran Hasselmark |
| Preceded by Karin Ahrland | Ambassador of Sweden to Samoa; 1996–1998 | Succeeded by Göran Hasselmark |
