= Gertrud Sigurdsen =

Swedish politician (1923–2015)

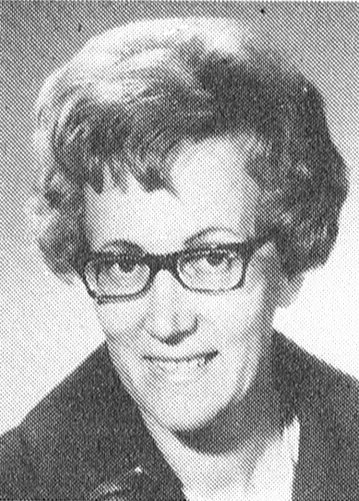

Minister of Social Affairs
- In office 17 October 1985 – 29 January 1989
- Prime Minister: Olof Palme; Ingvar Carlsson
- Preceded by: Sten Andersson
- Succeeded by: Sven Hulterström

Minister of Healthcare
- In office 8 October 1982 – 1985
- Prime Minister: Olof Palme
- Preceded by: Karin Ahrland
- Succeeded by: Bengt Lindqvist

Minister of Aid
- In office 3 November 1973 – 8 October 1976
- Prime Minister: Olof Palme
- Preceded by: Alva Myrdal
- Succeeded by: Ola Ullsten

Personal details
- Born: Gertrud Kristina Blixt; 11 January 1923 Nyköping, Sweden
- Died: 27 March 2015 (aged 92) Stockholm, Sweden
- Party: Swedish Social Democratic Party
- Spouse: Rolf Sigurdsen (m. 1953–1960)
- Cabinet: Palme I Palme II Carlsson I

Gertrud Kristina Blixt-Sigurdsen, née Blixt, (11 January 1923 – 27 March 2015) was a Swedish Social Democratic politician and Member of Parliament, who served as Minister of Social Affairs from 1985 to 1989.

Sigurdsen started her political career as ombudsman in the Swedish Trade Union Confederation in 1949. On 3 November 1973 she was made Minister of Aid within the Ministry for Foreign Affairs in the cabinet of Olof Palme. She held the office until the Social Democrats lost the election in 1976. When Olof Palme and the Social Democratic party came to power again on 8 October 1982, she was made Minister of Healthcare within the Ministry of Social Affairs. In 1985 she succeeded Sten Andersson as Minister of Social Affairs and was made head of her own ministry. She was a member of the Swedish parliament from 1969 to 1991 and a member of the executive committee of the Social Democratic party from 1968 to 1990.

Sigurdsen was born in the small village of Nävekvarn, near Nyköping, as the daughter of the tractor operator Arvid Blixt and his wife Cecilia, née Karlsson. She was married to the Norwegian Rolf Sigurdsen (1922–1972) between 1953 and 1960; together they had two sons Odd (born 1954) and Björn (born 1956).
