= World Blind Union =

Blindness organization based in Toronto, Canada

- Formation: 1984; 42 years ago
- Headquarters: Toronto, Canada
- Website: www.worldblindunion.org

The World Blind Union (WBU) is an international organization representing people worldwide who are blind or partially sighted. It consists of other organizations, not individuals.

== History, scope, and organization ==
The World Blind Union was formed in 1984 through the union of the International Federation of the Blind and the World Council for the Welfare of the Blind.

The WBU is a non-political, non-religious, non-governmental and non-profit-making organization. WBU members are organizations of and for the blind in about 190 countries and international organizations working in the field of vision impairment. The WBU conducts its work through six regions. These are: Africa, Asia, Asia-Pacific, Europe, Latin America, and North America and the Caribbean. The World Blind Union is governed by an Officers Board composed of six internationally elected Officers and the six regional presidents, as well as an executive committee. The WBU has its administrative office located in Toronto, Canada, and currently has three staff members. In order to raise funds for their work, the World Blind Union has registered as a charity under the Canada Revenue Agency.

== Purpose ==
The stated goal of the World Blind Union is a global community where people who are blind or partially sighted are empowered to participate on an equal basis in any aspect of life they choose.

The purpose of the World Blind Union is a worldwide movement of blind and partially sighted people acting on their own behalf to make the world a better, safer place for all blind and partially sighted individuals. The WBU wants to eliminate prejudice towards blind and disabled people, promote belief in the proven abilities of blind people, and achieve full participation in society. These goals are worked on through the committees and working groups set up to deal with specific issues such as technology, mobility, and transportation. There are also special interests groups that deal with the specific concerns of blind women, elderly people, youth, children, and those with low vision.

There is a WBU constitution that can be accessed on the WBU website that spells out the conditions of membership and the benefits and obligations of the member countries and the national blindness organizations that represent the member countries. All countries fulfilling the conditions laid down in the WBU Constitution are welcomed as members with the right to express their opinions and points of view freely and without fear of recrimination. WBU has consultative status within the UN Agencies and ECOSOC.

On August 18–25, 2016, the World Blind Union co-sponsored a joint assembly with the International Council for Education of People with Visual Impairment (ICEVI) in Orlando, Florida. When completed, this event will have facilitated the WBI, ICEVI, and their members in sharing information and best practices and promoted greater inter-organizational cooperation. This will have been the first World Blind Union General Assembly held in the United States.

== See also ==
- World Braille Day
