= Benito Cereno (film) =

- Directed by: Serge Roullet
- Screenplay by: Serge Roullet (adapted from Herman Melville novella Benito Cereno)
- Produced by: Les Films Niepce
- Starring: Ruy Guerra, Georges Selmark, Teemour Diop, Jacques Mercier, John Turner, Philippe Nourry
- Cinematography: Ricardo Aronovich
- Edited by: Serge Roullet
- Release date: 1969
- Running time: 80 minutes
- Country: France

Benito Cereno is a 1969 French drama film directed by Serge Roullet. It is based on the novella Benito Cereno, by American writer Herman Melville.

== Synopsis ==
In 1799 the black slaves being transported in a three mast ship captained by the South American, Benito Cereno, rebel. After killing part of the crew, they subdue the captain. The rebel slaves order him to set sail for Africa, but the ship runs into trouble. Delano, the U.S. Captain of a whaler comes to their assistance. Once aboard, everything seems to be in order. The slaves act like slaves. But certain details disturb Delano.
