= Disability History Association =

Organization about disability

The Disability History Association (DHA) is an international non-profit organization that promotes the study of disabilities. DHA Membership is open to scholars, institutions and organizations and is an affiliated member of the American Historical Association (AHA) and the Organization of American Historians (OAH).

== History of the Disability History Association ==
The Disability History Association originated with informal conversations by a group of pioneering disability scholars at the Summer Institute on Disability Studies in the Humanities at San Francisco State University in 2000. The following year, they created H-Disability, a discussion group in the prominent online scholarly platform H-Net. In 2004, the organization held its first board meeting, and then the community was incorporated into the Disability History Association in 2007. In 2008, the Disability History Association, British Disability History Group, and the San Francisco State University cosponsored an international academic conference for disability history. The DHA sponsors the Outstanding Publication Award, awarded annually to a book or an article which explores significant new ground in the field of disability history. From 2012 to 2017, the DHA alternated offering the Outstanding Book Chapter or Article Award and the Outstanding Book Award, but in 2018 began offering both awards each year.

=== Outstanding Publication Award Winners ===
Year	Outstanding Book Chapter or Article Award winner	Outstanding Book Award winner
2012	—	2012: David M. Turner. New Disability in Eighteenth-Century England: Imagining Physical Impairment. (York: Routledge, 2012)
2013	2013: Audra Jennings. "'An Emblem of Distinction': The Politics of Disability Entitlement, 1940-1950," in Veterans' Policies, Veterans' Politics: New Perspectives on Veterans in the Modern United States ed. Stephen R. Ortiz, (University Press of Florida, 2012)	—
2014	—	2014: Sebastian Barsch, Anne Klein, and Pieter Verstraete, eds. The Imperfect Historian: Disability Histories in Europe (Frankfurt am Main: Peter Lang, 2013).
2015	2015: Dea H. Boster, "'I Made Up My Mind to Act Both Deaf and Dumb': Displays of Disability and Slave Resistance in the Antebellum American South," Disability and Passing: Blurring the Lines of Identity, Jeffrey A. Brune and Daniel J. Wilson, eds. (Philadelphia: Temple University Press, 2013), 71–98.	—
2016	—	2016: Sara Scalenghe, Disability in the Ottoman Arab World, 1500-1800 (New York: Cambridge University Press, 2014).
2017	Laura Micheletti Puaca, "The Largest Occupational Group of All the Disabled: Homemakers with Disabilities and Vocational Rehabilitation in Postwar America," in Disabling Domesticity, ed. Michael Rembis (New York: Palgrave Macmillan, 2016), 73–102.	—
2018	Laurel Daen, "Martha Ann Honeywell: Art, Performance, and Disability in the Early Republic," Journal of the Early Republic 37, no.2 (2017): 225–250.	Sarah F. Rose, No Right to Be Idle: The Invention of Disability, 1840s-1930s (Chapel Hill: The University of North Carolina Press, 2017).

== Current Board of Directors, 2019-2020 ==
- Sara Scalenghe - Chair
- Lindsey Patterson - Vice President
- Aparna Nair - VP for Communications
- Kathleen Brian - Treasurer
- Caroline Lieffers - Graduate Student Representative
- Nicole Belolan - Member
- Susan Burch - Member
- Iain Hutchison - Member
- Sandy Sufian - Member
- Jaipreet Virdi -Member

== Past Leadership ==
- Kim E. Nielsen, past president.
