= Embassy of Sweden, Luanda =

Diplomatic mission of Sweden in Angola

- Location: Luanda
- Address: Visiting address: Rua Garcia Neto nº 9 Miramar; Luanda; Postal address: Embassy of Sweden; C.P. 1130; Luanda; Angola
- Coordinates: 8.81092°S 13.25275°E
- Opened: 1976
- Closed: November 2022
- Ambassador: Lennart Killander Larsson (since 2022)
- Jurisdiction: Angola
- Website: Official website

The Embassy of Sweden in Luanda was Sweden's diplomatic mission in Angola. The first Swedish ambassador was accredited to Luanda in 1976. The ambassador was also accredited to São Tomé. The embassy mainly focused on Sweden and trade promotion activities. The embassy closed in November 2022 following a decision by Sweden's government. The Swedish ambassador is from 1 December 2022 based in Stockholm, Sweden.

== History ==
Angola became independent on 11 November 1975. On 18 February 1976, Sweden (together with Norway, Denmark, the Netherlands, the United Kingdom, Italy, Ireland, and Switzerland) recognized the MPLA government in Angola. In a telegram to Foreign Minister José Eduardo dos Santos, Sweden's Foreign Minister Sven Andersson expressed the Swedish government's best wishes and proposed diplomatic relations between Sweden and Angola. The Swedish embassy in Luanda opened in October 1976, merely six months after the recognition. Moreover, Sweden was among the initial nations to commence economic aid cooperation with Angola. A dedicated economic aid office was established on 1 February 1977. Sweden provided substantial support to the country's liberation struggle, and throughout the Angolan Civil War spanning from 1975 to 2002, it stood as one of the largest donors. With Angola experiencing rapid economic development, Swedish economic aid gradually phased out during the 2000s. In the 2010s, the Swedish embassy in Luanda shared premises with Norway's embassy, primarily focusing on Sweden and facilitating trade promotion activities.

On 19 December 2007, the Swedish government decided to close the embassy in Luanda. According to the government's assessment, tasks such as promoting Swedish interests in the country and reporting on Angola's economic and political development could be handled by the Swedish embassy in Pretoria, South Africa, as well as by the Swedish Trade Council, which had been in place in Luanda since October 2007. The closure was scheduled to take place by 31 August 2008, and an honorary consulate would instead be opened. On 21 August 2008, the decision to close the embassy in Luanda was repealed. Instead, a pilot project was implemented with a new type of miniature embassy with a limited operational assignment. This was intended to ensure Sweden's presence in Angola at a lower cost. On 2 October 2008, the decision was made to open a secretariat for trade at the embassy to develop trade relations with Angola. The office became a natural part of the embassy's operations and was run by the Swedish Trade Council.

The project involving the miniature embassy in Luanda entailed that the embassy's mission was, in principle, limited to export promotion, but there was also handling of consular assistance. The ambassador, who was the only seconded official, shared premises and reception with the Swedish Trade Council and Ericsson. By agreement, the Swedish Trade Council was responsible for the embassy's financial administration. The embassy also had two local employees, a secretary, and a chauffeur. The ambassador had a domestic worker. A Swedish honorary consulate on-site handled the limited consular activities. The honorary consul also served as a representative of the National Property Board of Sweden on-site, which facilitated matters, as property management and care in a place like Luanda would otherwise have consumed a significant amount of the embassy's time. In the absence of the ambassador, the Trade Council's trade secretary was designated as a diplomat; he had been able to step in for the ambassador on several occasions. However, this solution was vulnerable. Instead, the ambassador's absence had sometimes been addressed by sending a substitute or by the ambassador simply acting as a chargé d'affaires.

On 22 December 2010, the Swedish government decided to close the embassy in Luanda. The embassy closed on 1 July 2011. On 22 September 2011, it was decided that the embassy would be re-established following a decision that resulted from the agreement reached on 1 August 2011 between the governing parties and the Social Democrats. In November 2021, the Swedish government announced its intention to close the embassy in Luanda during the second half of 2022. The embassy closed in November 2022 following a decision by the Swedish government. Bilateral relations will continue under new forms. On 1 December 2022, an ambassador for Angola took office, stationed in Stockholm. The ambassador travels to Angola regularly. A Swedish honorary consulate in Luanda is being established.

== Staff and tasks ==
The embassy's mission was to strengthen relations between the governments of Sweden and Angola, as well as between the citizens, organizations, and businesses of both countries. Trade issues were increasingly taking up a larger part of the embassy's work, with a focus on supporting Swedish companies in advancing their positions in the Angolan market. The embassy also promoted increased Angolan exports to Sweden.

== Buildings ==
=== Chancery ===
The chancery was built in 1984–85 after drawings by two architects at White & Partners, Rune Falk and Lisa Hanson. Architect Leif Lindstrand in Järrestad in Scania was the project manager and over two years commuted 22 times between Sturup and Luanda. The chancery was inaugurated on 31 January 1986 by the Minister for Energy Birgitta Dahl assisted by the director general of the National Swedish Board of Public Building (Byggnadsstyrelsen) Hans Löwbeer. Sweden was the first country to build a new embassy in Angola after the independence in 1975. The building cost SEK 39 million and, in addition to the chancery, also contained 26 terraced houses. In 2014, the building became a chancery for both Sweden and Norway. The National Property Board of Sweden began the conversion to two embassies in the same building in 2013. The Swedish and Norwegian embassy buildings in Angola were located in Miramar, an area in the central part of the capital Luanda. Surrounding buildings were characterized by residential buildings in 1-2 floors with tree plantings facing the street. The scale of the embassy building was adapted to the surrounding residential buildings. The entrance level contained a reception, conversation room, and waiting room as well as a janitor room, storage room, living room, library, and office room. On the upper level were the ambassador's office, meeting rooms, and other chancery premises.

The building's frame was made of cast-in-place concrete with inner and outer walls of plastered concrete masonry units. Window sections were made of aluminum with insulating glass panes. Light Nordic wood in the form of birch was found in the interior. The doors consisted of birch with steel frames, and the fixed interior also consisted, to some extent, of birch. The floors were consistently tiled. In connection with the chancery being divided by Sweden and Norway, it was completely renovated by the National Property Board of Sweden. This work was carried out in 2013–14.

=== Residence ===
The ambassadorial residence was located at one of Angola's most exclusive addresses, just a few hundred meters from the President's residence. Sweden had had the residence since the autumn of 1976.

Following the decision to close the embassy in 2010, all furniture and other furnishings were sold to a Swedish businessman for SEK 135,000. In July 2011, the dismantling was completed. But already in August 2011, the government backed down after reaching an agreement with the Social Democrats. After the embassy and residence were reopened, the ambassador had to rent back the old interior.
