= World Council for the Welfare of the Blind =

Blindness organization

The World Council for the Welfare of the Blind (WCWB) was an organization of agencies for the blind (visually impaired) established in 1949. It combined with the International Federation of the Blind in 1984 to create the World Blind Union.

== History ==
Initially headquartered in Oxford, England, the (WCWB) worked to coordinate efforts among various agencies and organizations dedicated to assisting people with blindness across the globe. Over the decades, the WCWB has been significant in uniting voices for the visually impaired, promoting accessible technologies, and influencing disability policies internationally.

In 1984, the WCWB merged with the International Federation of the Blind (IFB), forming the World Blind Union (WBU) during a founding assembly held in Riyadh, Saudi Arabia. This new organization expanded the WCWB's mission, aiming to provide a unified platform for blind and partially sighted individuals to advocate for their rights on a global scale.
