= Vem är det =

Swedish biographical dictionary

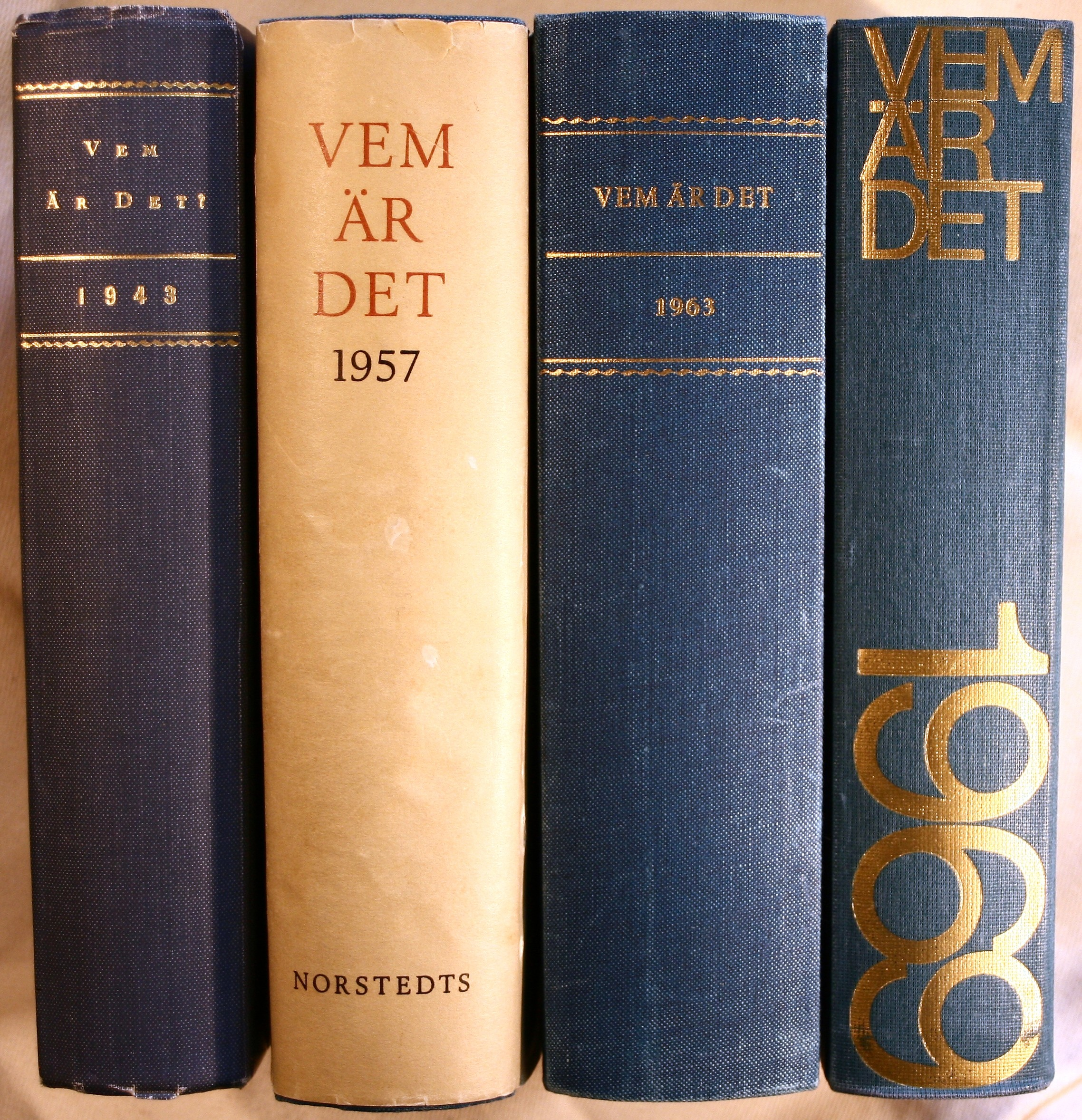
Several editions of Vem är det

Vem är det, with the subtitle Svensk biografisk handbok, is a Swedish Who's Who biographical reference publication which has been published in 46 editions since 1912.
