= List of ambassadors of Sweden to Mauritius =

Ambassador of Sweden to Mauritius
- Lesser coat of arms of the Kingdom of Sweden
- Incumbent; Per Lindgärde since 2023
- Ministry for Foreign Affairs
- Style: His or Her Excellency (formal); Mr. or Madam Ambassador (informal)
- Reports to: Minister for Foreign Affairs
- Seat: Harare, Zimbabwe (Note: The Swedish ambassador to Mauritius was based in Harare, Zimbabwe until 2026.)
- Appointer: Government of Sweden
- Term length: No fixed term
- Inaugural holder: Bengt Friedman
- Formation: 1977

The Ambassador of Sweden to Mauritius (formally known as the Ambassador of the Kingdom of Sweden to the Republic of Mauritius) is Sweden's official representative to the government of Mauritius and the president of Mauritius. As Sweden does not have an embassy in Port Louis, the capital of Mauritius, the Swedish ambassador to Mauritius was based in Harare, Zimbabwe, until the Swedish embassy there closed in 2026.

== History ==
In connection with the independence of Mauritius on 12 March 1968, Swedish foreign minister Torsten Nilsson sent a congratulatory telegram to the prime minister of Mauritius, Sir Seewoosagur Ramgoolam, on the occasion of the proclamation of Mauritius's independence. In the telegram, Nilsson stated that the Swedish government recognised Mauritius as a sovereign and independent state and that Sweden wished to maintain friendly and cordial relations with Mauritius.

Sweden and Mauritius established diplomatic relations in 1973. In 1977, Sweden's first ambassador to Mauritius was accredited; he was based in Addis Ababa, Ethiopia. The Swedish ambassador to Ethiopia was concurrently accredited to Mauritius from 1977 to 1981, after which an ambassador-at-large based in Stockholm, responsible for countries in the Indian Ocean region, took over the accreditation.

The Swedish ambassador to South Africa was also accredited to Mauritius from 1999 to 2000. Thereafter, the Swedish ambassador to Zimbabwe, based in Harare, was accredited to Mauritius from 2002 until the Swedish embassy in Harare closed in 2026.

== List of representatives ==
Name	Period	Title	Resident / Concurrent accreditation	Notes	Presented credentials	Ref
Mauritius (1968–1992)
Bengt Friedman	1977–1978	Ambassador	Resident in Addis Ababa			
Arne Helleryd	1978–1981	Ambassador	Resident in Addis Ababa			
Arne Fältheim	1981–1983	Ambassador	Resident in Stockholm			
Finn Bergstrand	1983–1986	Ambassador	Resident in Stockholm			
Lars Arnö	1987–1988	Ambassador	Resident in Stockholm			
Lars Schönander	1988–1991	Ambassador	Resident in Stockholm			
Republic of Mauritius (1992–present)
Krister Göranson	1992–1998	Ambassador	Resident in Stockholm			
Bo Heinebäck	1999–2000	Ambassador	Resident in Pretoria			
–	2001–2001	Ambassador		Vacant		
Kristina Svensson	2002–2005	Ambassador	Resident in Harare			
Sten Rylander	2006–2010	Ambassador	Resident in Harare			
Anders Lidén	2010–2012	Ambassador	Resident in Harare			
Lars Ronnås	2012–2016	Ambassador	Resident in Harare			
Sofia Calltorp	September 2016 – 2019	Ambassador	Resident in Harare		August 2017	
Åsa Pehrson	1 September 2019 – 2023	Ambassador	Resident in Harare		November 2021	
Per Lindgärde	August 2023 – present	Ambassador	Resident in Harare		13 August 2024	
