= List of ambassadors of Sweden to Rwanda =

Ambassador of Sweden to Rwanda
- Lesser coat of arms of the Kingdom of Sweden
- Incumbent; Henrik Nilsson since 2026
- Ministry for Foreign Affairs; Swedish Embassy, Kigali
- Style: His or Her Excellency (formal); Mr. or Madam Ambassador (informal)
- Reports to: Minister for Foreign Affairs
- Seat: Kigali, Rwanda
- Appointer: Government of Sweden
- Term length: No fixed term
- Inaugural holder: Otto Rathsman
- Formation: 1964
- Website: Swedish Embassy, Kigali

The Ambassador of Sweden to Rwanda (known formally as the Ambassador of the Kingdom of Sweden to the Republic of Rwanda) is the official representative of the government of Sweden to the president of Rwanda and government of Rwanda.

== History ==
The Swedish government recognized the Republic of Rwanda as a sovereign and independent state in a congratulatory telegram sent by Sweden's Minister for Foreign Affairs, Östen Undén, to Rwanda's Minister for Foreign Affairs, Otto Rusingizandekwe, on 1 July 1962. At the same time, Minister Undén expressed the Swedish government's desire to maintain friendly and cordial relations with Rwanda. King Gustaf VI Adolf also sent a congratulatory telegram. Two years later, Sweden's ambassador in Nairobi, Otto Rathsman, was also accredited as ambassador to Rwanda. After Rathsman left his post in 1966, Sweden had no accredited ambassador to Rwanda until 1974.

In 2010, Sweden opened an embassy in Rwanda by upgrading the Swedish International Development Cooperation Agency's existing section office. Since August 2016, Sweden has had a resident ambassador in Kigali.

== List of representatives ==
Name	Period	Resident / Non-resident	Title	Resident / Concurrent accreditation	Notes	Presented credentials	Ref
Otto Rathsman	1964–1966	Non-resident	Ambassador	Resident in Nairobi			
–	1966–1974	Non-resident	–				
Lennart Rydfors	1974–1978	Non-resident	Ambassador	Resident in Nairobi			
Cecilia Nettelbrandt	1978–1983	Non-resident	Ambassador	Resident in Nairobi			
Arne Fältheim	1983–1988	Non-resident	Ambassador	Resident in Nairobi			
Nils Gunnar Revelius	1989–1993	Non-resident	Ambassador	Resident in Nairobi			
Lars-Göran Engfeldt	1993–1998	Non-resident	Ambassador	Resident in Nairobi			
Inga Björk-Klevby	1998–2002	Non-resident	Ambassador	Resident in Nairobi			
Bo Göransson	2003–2006	Non-resident	Ambassador	Resident in Nairobi			
Anna Brandt	2006–2009	Non-resident	Ambassador	Resident in Nairobi			
Ann Dismorr	2009–2012	Non-resident	Ambassador	Resident in Nairobi			
Mikael Lindvall	September 2010 – July 2012	Resident	Chargé d'affaires				
Maria Håkansson	2012–2016	Resident	Chargé d'affaires				
Urban Andersson	2014–2016	Non-resident	Ambassador	Resident in Kampala		18 March 2014	
Jenny Ohlsson	October 2016 – 2020	Resident	Ambassador				
Johanna Teague	August 2020 – 2024	Resident	Ambassador				
Dag Sjöögren	2024–2026	Resident	Ambassador				
Henrik Nilsson	2026–present	Resident	Ambassador			16 October 2026	
