= List of ambassadors of Sweden to Uganda =

Ambassador of Sweden to Uganda
- Lesser coat of arms of the Kingdom of Sweden
- Incumbent; Anna-Maria Olsson since August 2026
- Ministry for Foreign Affairs; Swedish Embassy, Kampala
- Style: His or Her Excellency (formal); Mr. or Madam Ambassador (informal)
- Reports to: Minister for Foreign Affairs
- Residence: 22 Elizabeth Ave., Kololo
- Seat: Kampala, Uganda
- Appointer: Government of Sweden
- Term length: No fixed term
- Inaugural holder: Otto Rathsman
- Formation: 1964
- Website: Swedish Embassy, Kampala

The Ambassador of Sweden to Uganda (known formally as the Ambassador of the Kingdom of Sweden to the Republic of Uganda) is the official representative of the government of Sweden to the president of Uganda and government of Uganda.

== History ==
On the occasion of Uganda's proclamation of independence on 9 October 1962, Sweden's prime minister, Tage Erlander, sent a congratulatory telegram to Uganda's prime minister, Milton Obote. He stated that the Swedish government recognized Uganda as a sovereign and independent state and expressed its desire to maintain friendly and cordial relations with Uganda. At the independence celebrations in Kampala, Sweden was represented by Consul General Otto Rathsman, who served as Ambassadeur en mission spéciale, tasked with conveying the Swedish king's congratulations. Two years later, after Rathsman became Sweden's ambassador in Nairobi, he was also accredited as Sweden's first ambassador to Kampala.

In 1999, Sweden's embassy in Kampala was opened, and in July of the same year, Hans Andersson was appointed as Sweden's first resident ambassador in Kampala.

== List of representatives ==
Name	Period	Title	Notes	Ref
Sovereign State of Uganda (1963–1967) and Republic of Uganda (1967–1971)
Otto Rathsman	1964–1966	Ambassador	Resident in Nairobi.	
Carl Gustaf Béve	1966–1968	Ambassador	Resident in Nairobi.	
Carl-George Crafoord	1969–1971	Ambassador	Resident in Nairobi.	
Second Republic of Uganda (1971–1979)
Carl-George Crafoord	1971–1973	Ambassador	Resident in Nairobi.	
Lennart Rydfors	1973–1978	Ambassador	Resident in Nairobi.	
Third Republic of Uganda (1979–1986)
Cecilia Nettelbrandt	1979–1983	Ambassador	Resident in Nairobi.	
Arne Fältheim	1983–1986	Ambassador	Resident in Nairobi.	
Fourth Republic of Uganda (1986–present)
Arne Fältheim	1986–1988	Ambassador	Resident in Nairobi.	
Nils Revelius	1989–1993	Ambassador	Resident in Nairobi.	
Lars-Göran Engfeldt	1993–1998	Ambassador	Resident in Nairobi.	
Hans Andersson	1999–2002	Ambassador		
Erik Åberg	2002–2006	Ambassador		
Anders Johnson	2007–2011	Ambassador		
Urban Andersson	2011–2016	Ambassador	Accredited to Kigali (from 2014).	
Per Lindgärde	October 2016 – 2021	Ambassador	Accredited to Bangui (from 2017) and N'Djamena (from 2018).	
Maria Håkansson	2021–2026	Ambassador	Accredited to Bangui (from 2022) and N'Djamena (from 2025).	
Anna-Maria Olsson	August 2026 – present	Ambassador		
