= Kvarnholmen =

Kvarnholmen may refer to several locations in Sweden:

- Kvarnholmen, Kalmar, an island in Kalmar, Kalmar County, and also the city centre.
- Kvarnholmen, Nacka, a peninsula in Nacka, Stockholm County.
- Kvarnholmen, Norrköping, Östergötland County, a former island in central Norrköping.
