= Bo Heinebäck =

Swedish diplomat (1937–2021)

- Born: Kurt Axel Bo Heinebäck; 2 March 1937; Motala, Sweden
- Died: 19 September 2021 (aged 84); Sollentuna, Sweden
- Education: Uppsala University
- Occupation: Diplomat
- Years active: 1964–2002
- Spouse(s): Barbara Taylor (m. 1972; div. 1976) Katarina Landgren (m. 1994; div. 2014)
- Children: 2

Kurt Axel Bo "Bosse" Heinebäck (2 March 1937 – 19 September 2021) was a Swedish diplomat who served in several diplomatic posts during his career. He joined the Swedish Ministry for Foreign Affairs in 1964 and held postings in Algiers and Washington, D.C. From 1977 to 1980, he served at Sweden's Permanent Mission to the United Nations in New York City, where he focused on Southern African affairs and decolonization.

In 1980, Heinebäck became Sweden's ambassador to Zimbabwe, serving until 1984. He subsequently held senior positions at the Ministry for Foreign Affairs, including director of a division responsible for Asian affairs and head of press. In 1990, he was appointed ambassador to Australia, with concurrent responsibility for several Pacific island states. From 1994, he served as ambassador to South Africa, also assuming responsibility for Mauritius in 1999.

After leaving his embassy post in 2000, Heinebäck moved to Botswana, where he advised former president Quett Masire. He participated in the Inter-Congolese Dialogue, an initiative aimed at resolving the Second Congo War, until 2002.

== Early life ==
Heinebäck was born on 2 March 1937 in his aunt's house in Motala Parish, in Motala, Sweden, to Carl Axel Heinebäck (1910–1991), a police inspector, and his wife, Ingrid Larsson (1915–1987), who worked as a domestic assistant. He had four brothers, one older and two younger. He grew up with his family in Mjölby and Eksjö, in the province of Småland, where he spent his school years. In his youth, he enjoyed gymnastics and athletics. At the age of 20, he completed his compulsory military service with the Göta Engineer Corps in Eksjö.

He graduated from Uppsala University with a Candidate of Law degree in 1963. Alongside his studies, he served in 1962 as a personnel welfare officer with the Swedish United Nations forces deployed to the United Nations Operation in the Congo (ONUC) in the Republic of the Congo.

== Career ==
In September 1964, Heinebäck was selected by the Ministry for Foreign Affairs' training board as one of ten candidates for its newly established paid diplomatic training programme, which replaced the previous system of recruiting attachés. He was admitted to the same cohort as Bo Henrikson, Ingolf Kiesow, Lars Norberg, and Ulf Schöldström. In June 1967, he was appointed embassy secretary in Algiers. In June 1969, he was assigned to serve in Washington, D.C., and in October 1971, he was promoted to first embassy secretary.

From 1973 to 1975, he worked at the Stockholm International Peace Research Institute (SIPRI). He then returned to the ministry, serving as a desk officer (departementssekreterare) in Stockholm. Between 1975 and 1977, he worked in the ministry's division responsible for Africa and the Middle East. In March 1976, Heinebäck joined a five-member delegation from the Ministry for Foreign Affairs and the Swedish Trade Council that travelled to Angola, just months after the country gained independence, to explore opportunities for a major new Swedish export initiative. In August 1977, he participated in the Swedish delegation to the World Conference for Action against Apartheid in Lagos, Nigeria.

In September 1977, Heinebäck was appointed first embassy secretary at Sweden's Permanent Mission to the United Nations in New York City. There, he served, among other roles, as an alternate member of the United Nations General Assembly Fourth Committee. From September 1977 to March 1980, he specialised in Southern African affairs and decolonization at the Swedish UN representation. He also served as Sweden's expert on a United Nations working group on Southern Africa.

In March 1980, Sweden planned to seek accreditation for a chargé d'affaires in time for Zimbabwe's independence celebrations, with the intention of opening an embassy in the country shortly thereafter. That same month, Heinebäck took charge of operations at the Swedish liaison office in Salisbury. Sweden recognised Zimbabwe as a sovereign and independent state on 18 April 1980, the day of its independence. Diplomatic relations were established immediately, and Heinebäck had already been nominated as Sweden's ambassador to the new state. He served as ambassador in Harare from 1980 to 1984.

After four years in Zimbabwe, Heinebäck was appointed director (departementsråd) at the Ministry for Foreign Affairs' Political Department, Division Four, which handled Asian affairs. He served as a director from 1984 to 1986 and as head of press at the ministry from 1986 to 1990. In 1990, he was appointed ambassador to Canberra, with concurrent responsibilities for Port Vila and Honiara. In 1991, he also became responsible for relations with Port Moresby. From 1994, he served as ambassador to Pretoria, and from 1999, he also held responsibility for Port Louis.

During his posting to South Africa, Heinebäck was involved in the case of Craig Williamson. In 1996, Swedish investigators travelled to South Africa to investigate the South African connection in the inquiry into the assassination of Olof Palme. Among the activities was an interrogation of Eugene de Kock at his prison in Pretoria by Tommy Lindström, a Swedish investigator. In February 1997, Heinebäck was responsible for arrangements surrounding the Swedish royal couple's state visit to South Africa. He also handled matters relating to the sale of the Saab JAS 39 Gripen fighter aircraft to South Africa and Swedish prime minister Göran Persson's visit to the country in November 1999.

Heinebäck's final working day at the embassy was 5 September 2000. He subsequently moved to Gaborone, Botswana, where he became a close adviser to former Botswana president Quett Masire. Masire had been appointed by other Southern African countries to facilitate negotiations among all parties involved in the Second Congo War. Heinebäck concluded his assignment with the Inter-Congolese Dialogue in 2002.

== Personal life ==
In March 1972, Heinebäck married Barbara Taylor (born 1944), originally from Georgia, in Washington, D.C.. At the time, she was a production secretary for the CBS programme Face the Nation. She later became the first African American woman to serve as a press officer to former First Lady Rosalynn Carter. The couple divorced in 1976. They had one son, Erik (born 1973).

In April 1994, Heinebäck married Katarina Landgren. They had one son, Carl (born 1995). Upon his retirement in 2002, Heinebäck returned from South Africa to Australia with his family and settled in Canberra. He and Katarina divorced in 2014.

During his retirement and final years, Heinebäck divided his time between Sweden and Australia, where his sons lived, until the COVID-19 pandemic disrupted his annual travels. He owned a summer house, Lövbacka, just south of Myresjö, in the province of Småland.

== Death ==
Heinebäck died on 19 September 2021 in Sollentuna. The funeral service was held on 22 October 2021 at Saint Lawrence Chapel (S:t Lars kapell) in Eksjö. He was buried in his parents' grave at Skogskyrkogården in Eksjö on 1 July 2022.

== Bibliography ==
- Isaksson, Krister; Heinebäck, Bo, eds. (1989). Sverige och den västeuropeiska integrationen: vem informerar om vad? [Sweden and Western European integration: who informs whom about what?] (in Swedish). Stockholm: Utrikesdep. ISBN 91-7496-013-X. SELIBR 7644959.
- Heinebäck, Bo (1999). "Intryck efter fyra år i det nya Sydafrika" [Impressions after four years in the new South Africa]. In Elg, Margareta; Lundén, Thomas (eds.). Södra Afrika [Southern Africa] (in Swedish). Stockholm: Svenska sällsk. för antropologi och geografi. pp. 19–29. ISSN 0044-0477. SELIBR 2855497.

Diplomatic posts
Preceded by None	Ambassador of Sweden to Zimbabwe; 1980–1984	Succeeded by Lars Norberg
Preceded by Hans Björk	Ambassador of Sweden to Australia; 1990–1994	Succeeded by Göran Hasselmark
Preceded by Hans Björk	Ambassador of Sweden to the Solomon Islands; 1990–1994	Succeeded by Göran Hasselmark
Preceded by Hans Björk	Ambassador of Sweden to Vanuatu; 1990–1994	Succeeded by Kaj Falkman
Preceded by Hans Björk	Ambassador of Sweden to Papua New Guinea; 1991–1994	Succeeded by Kaj Falkman
Preceded by Ingemar Stjernberg	Ambassador of Sweden to South Africa; 1994–1999	Succeeded by Helena Nilsson Lannegren
Preceded by Krister Göranson	Ambassador of Sweden to Mauritius; 1999–2000	Succeeded by Kristina Svensson
