= Swedish Intellectual Property Office =

Swedish government agency

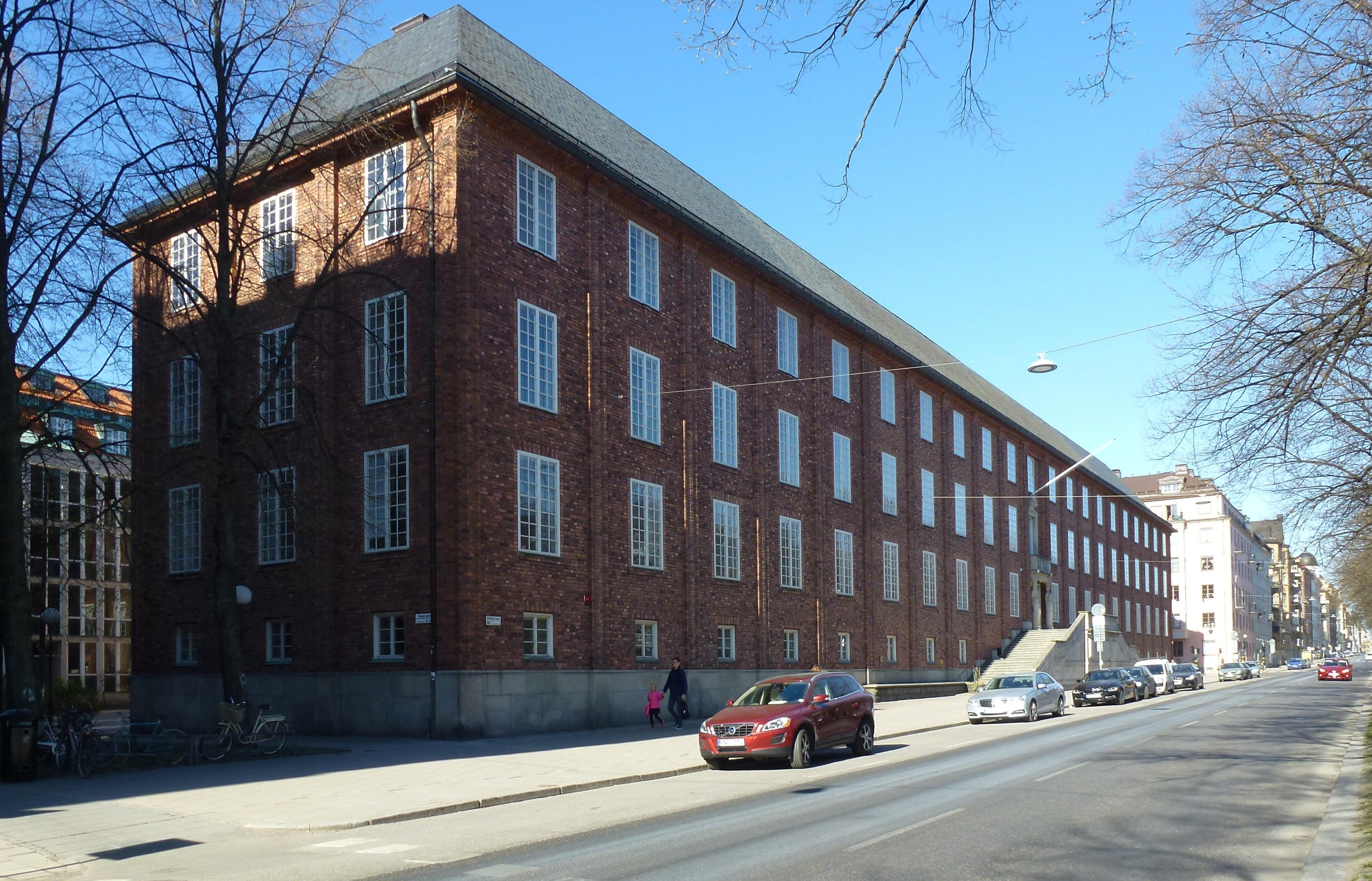

Agency overview
- Formed: 1885
- Website: www.prv.se

The Swedish Intellectual Property Office, formerly the National [Swedish] Patent and Registration Office (Swedish: Patent- och registreringsverket, PRV), is a Swedish government agency based in Stockholm and Söderhamn in charge of patents, trademarks and industrial designs. The Office acts as Patent Cooperation Treaty (PCT) authority, i.e. International Searching Authority (ISA) and International Preliminary Examining Authority (IPEA). Anna Jardfelt is the current Director General of the Office.

Its two-letter code is SE.

== History ==
The first Swedish patent laws were issued in 1819, 1834, 1856, and 1884. Applications were handled and patents granted by the National Board of Trade, and patents were published in the official journal Post- och Inrikes Tidningar. The law of 1819 granted a total of 89 "privilegia exclusiva" during the 15 years it was in effect. The law of 1834 used the word "patent", and 45 were issued in the first year alone. Patent applications were no longer scrutinized, but granted directly on application, with a requirement to publish the description officially and a public option of repeal. Similar patent systems were used in France and Belgium.

After the Paris Convention for the Protection of Industrial Property was signed in Paris in March 1883, Sweden modified its patent law in 1884 and joined the international convention on June 26, 1885. Serial numbers and annual fees were introduced in this law, and administration was moved from the Board of Trade to a new Royal Patent Office (Kongl. Patentbyrån). Swedish Patent No. 1 was published on June 5, 1885, valid since January 2, 1885, assigned to E.C. Burgess of London, England, for a liquid fuel burner.

In 1895, the Royal Patent Office was transformed into the National Swedish Patent and Registration Office (Patent- och registreringsverket). In May 2020 the English name was changed to "Swedish Intellectual Property Office".
