= Inga Björk-Klevby =

Swedish diplomat

- Born: Inga Karin Margareta Björk; 16 December 1944 (age 81); Nacka, Sweden
- Education: Stockholm School of Economics
- Occupation: Diplomat
- Years active: 1970–2000s
- Spouse: Bertil Klevby (m. 1973)
- Children: 2

Inga Karin Margareta Björk-Klevby, né Björk (born 16 December 1944) is a Swedish economist, diplomat, and former United Nations official. Educated at the Stockholm School of Economics, she began her career at the Sveriges Riksbank before working at the International Monetary Fund and within the Swedish Ministry for Foreign Affairs. She later held positions at the Asian Development Bank and in the Swedish Government Offices.

Between 1995 and 1998, Björk-Klevby served as Executive Director at the African Development Bank, representing Nordic countries, Switzerland, and India, and chaired the Committee on Development Effectiveness. She was subsequently appointed Sweden's ambassador to Kenya and later to Ivory Coast, with concurrent accreditation to several other African countries. During her posting in Nairobi, she also served as Sweden's Permanent Representative to the United Nations Environment Programme and the United Nations Human Settlements Programme.

In October 2005, United Nations Secretary-General Kofi Annan appointed her Deputy Executive Director of UN-Habitat. In this role, she was responsible for overseeing the management of the Habitat and Human Settlements Foundation and supporting the organization's work on water, sanitation, and slum upgrading.

== Early life ==
Inga Björk was born on 16 December 1944 in Nacka, Sweden, the daughter of the personnel manager Ivan Björk and his wife Märta (née Bergström). She grew up on Kvarnholmen in Nacka Municipality, where her parents had moved as newlyweds in 1937. Her father had then got a job at the local mill, Kvarnen Tre Kronor. She later wrote a book together with Christina Olsson about the island's history. She received a civilekonom degree from Stockholm School of Economics in 1970.

== Career ==
Björk-Klevby was employed at the Sveriges Riksbank from 1970 to 1976. She then served as senior administrative officer (byrådirektör) from 1979 to 1981, with intervening work at the International Monetary Fund (IMF) in Washington, D.C. from 1976 to 1979. She later worked as a desk officer (departementssekreterare) at the Ministry for Foreign Affairs from 1981 to 1986, followed by a position at the Asian Development Bank in Manila from 1986 to 1989. She subsequently held senior roles within the Swedish Government Offices, including deputy director (kansliråd) from 1989 to 1992 and director (departementsråd) from 1992 to 1995. During this period, she also served on the boards of the National Export Credits Guarantee Board and Swedfund from 1992 to 1995.

She served as Executive Director for the African Development Bank from 1995 to 1998 where she represented Nordic countries, Switzerland and India. While serving on the Board of the African Development Bank, she also chaired the Committee on Development Effectiveness, where she worked to strengthen the bank's evaluation and strategic planning functions.

She was appointed ambassador to Nairobi from 1998 to 2002, with concurrent accreditation to Bujumbura, Kigali, Moroni, and Victoria. During her posting in Nairobi, she also served as Sweden's Permanent Representative to the United Nations Environment Programme (UNEP) and the United Nations Human Settlements Programme (UN-Habitat). During this period, Björk-Klevby played a key role in restructuring the United Nations Centre of Human Settlements, a process that resulted in its elevation to programme status. She also acted as an advisor to the World Bank from 1999 to 2001.

She later served as ambassador to Abidjan from 2002 to 2005, with concurrent accreditation to Freetown, Monrovia, and Ouagadougou from 2003 onward. On 20 October 2005, United Nations Secretary-General Kofi Annan announced the appointment of Björk-Klevby as Deputy Executive Director of the UN-Habitat. The Deputy Executive Director's primary responsibility was to revitalize and oversee the management of the Habitat and Human Settlements Foundation in order to advance the United Nations Millennium Declaration's goals for water, sanitation, and slum upgrading, as reaffirmed and emphasized at the 2005 World Summit.

== Personal life ==
In 1973, she married Bertil Klevby (born 1943). They have two children.

== Bibliography ==
- Björk Klevby, Inga (2025). Var är ambassadören?: mitt liv som kvinna och diplomat [Where is the ambassador?: my life as a woman and diplomat] (in Swedish). Stockholm: Instant Book. ISBN 9789188823564. SELIBR vg85wc6ns3vs40c4.
- Björk Klevby, Inga; Olsson, Christina (2016). Kvarnholmen vår barndoms ö [Kvarnholmen, the island of our childhood] (in Swedish). Stockholm: Instant Book. SELIBR 19753585.

Diplomatic posts
Preceded by Lars-Göran Engfeldt	Ambassador of Sweden to Kenya; 1998–2002	Succeeded by Bo Göransson
Preceded by Lars-Göran Engfeldt	Ambassador of Sweden to Rwanda; 1998–2002	Succeeded by Bo Göransson
Preceded by Krister Göranson	Ambassador of Sweden to Comoros; 1998–2002	Succeeded by Bo Göransson
Preceded by Krister Göranson	Ambassador of Sweden to Seychelles; 1998–2002	Succeeded by Bo Göransson
Preceded by Göran Ankarberg	Ambassador of Sweden to Ivory Coast; 2002–2005	Succeeded by Carin Wall
Preceded by Göran Ankarberg	Ambassador of Sweden to Liberia; 2002–2005	Succeeded by Carin Wall
Preceded by Göran Ankarberg	Ambassador of Sweden to Sierra Leone; 2002–2005	Succeeded by Carin Wall
Preceded by Göran Ankarberg	Ambassador of Sweden to Burkina Faso; 2003–2005	Succeeded by Carin Wall
