= Bo Kälfors =

Swedish diplomat (1932–2007)

- Born: Bo Erik Kälfors; 30 October 1932; Gimo, Sweden
- Died: 16 May 2007 (aged 74); Stockholm, Sweden
- Burial place: Skogskyrkogården
- Other name: "Buddha"
- Education: Uppsala Högre Allmänna Läroverk; Uppsala University
- Occupation: Diplomat
- Years active: 1960–2000
- Spouse(s): Carin Engman (m. 1959, divorced) Lillemor Helin (m. 1972, divorced) Sheilah Oscampo (m. 1982)

Bo Erik Kälfors (30 October 1932 – 16 May 2007) was a Swedish diplomat who joined the Ministry for Foreign Affairs in 1961. He held diplomatic posts in Ankara, Geneva, Beirut, Gaborone and Manila, and served as Sweden's ambassador to the Philippines from 1980 to 1983 and to Mozambique from 1983 to 1988.

After his ambassadorial assignments, Kälfors worked on immigration and refugee issues within the Ministry for Foreign Affairs. From 1994 to 1997, he served as a refugee adviser to the European Union Administration in Mostar, Bosnia and Herzegovina. He subsequently worked in the Ministry's Migration Policy Unit until his retirement in 2000.

== Early life ==
Kälfors was born on 30 October 1932 in Gimo, Sweden, to Erik Kälfors and his wife, Eva Kälfors-Höglund. He attended Uppsala Högre Allmänna Läroverk (now Katedralskolan) in Uppsala. In 1960, he received a Candidate of Law degree from Uppsala University.

== Career ==
Kälfors served as a law clerk (tingsnotarie) from 1960 to 1962. In November 1961, he was recruited by the Swedish Ministry for Foreign Affairs as an attaché, alongside, among others, the future ambassador Henrik Amnéus. He formally served as an attaché from 1962 and was posted to the Swedish Embassy in Ankara in 1962–1963. He subsequently served as second and first secretary in Geneva from 1964 to 1967, desk officer (departementssekreterare) at the Ministry's Information Office (informationsbyrån) from 1967 to 1969, and deputy head of the office from 1969 to 1970.

From 1971 to 1975, he was first secretary at the Swedish Embassy in Beirut. During his posting in Lebanon, Kälfors was involved in the case of Swedish journalists Marcus Ölander of Sveriges Radio and Bengt Nordell of Dagens Nyheter, who were arrested by Lebanese police and accused of espionage while attempting to enter Saida to report on Israeli air raids in southern Lebanon in October 1972.

Kälfors served as counsellor and chargé d'affaires ad interim in Gaborone, Botswana, from 1975 to 1978. In January 1977, Kälfors became involved in the controversy surrounding the Manama children, following their departure from Rhodesia to Botswana. The incident attracted particular Swedish attention because the children came from Manama Mission School, a former Church of Sweden Mission school. Kälfors followed the developing situation closely and reported to the Swedish government on the conflicting accounts surrounding the children's departure. While Rhodesian authorities claimed that the children had been abducted by the Zimbabwe African People's Union (ZAPU), the Botswana authorities maintained that they had left voluntarily, in the wider context of Africans fleeing repression in Rhodesia. Kälfors's reports were also shared with the Church of Sweden Mission and became part of its efforts to understand the situation and consider possible action.

From 1979 to 1980, Kälfors was counsellor and chargé d'affaires ad interim in Manila, Philippines. When Sweden's independent embassy in Manila opened on 1 July 1980, he was appointed ambassador. He remained in the post until 1983. In 1983, Kälfors's wife, Philippine-born journalist Sheila Ocampo, became the subject of arrest warrants issued by the Philippine government over an article in the Far Eastern Economic Review alleging a military massacre of civilians in Samar. Kälfors and Ocampo left the Philippines for San Francisco on 26 July 1983 following a personal intervention by President Ferdinand Marcos.

Kälfors served as ambassador to Maputo, Mozambique from 1983 to 1988, with dual accreditation to Mbabane, Swaziland. In 1988, he received a special assignment with the minister for immigration and returned to the Ministry for Foreign Affairs in 1991, where he worked on international refugee and migration issues. From 1992, he was attached to the First Unit (Pol 1), responsible for bilateral and multilateral relations with the CSCE states, within the Ministry's Political Department. From 1994 to 1997, Kälfors served as a refugee adviser to the European Union Administration in Mostar, Bosnia and Herzegovina. From 1997, he worked in the Ministry's Migration Policy Unit until his retirement in 2000.

== Personal life ==
Kälfors became engaged to Lena Christofferson in Vingåker on Midsummer Eve in 1954. On 24 May 1958, he became engaged to Carin Engman in Uppsala, the daughter of vicar Gunnar Engman and his wife Elsa (née Blohm). They married at Skeppsholmen Church in Stockholm on Whit Saturday in 1959. They had a son, born in 1961.

On 14 January 1972, Kälfors married Lillemor Helin (née Örneland) at the Swedish Embassy in Beirut. A fourth son was born in Beirut later that year, and a daughter was born in Gaborone in 1976.

In 1982, Kälfors married the Philiipine journalist Sheilah Oscampo (born 1944). Sheilah was previously married to Filipino politician, activist, and journalist Satur Ocampo.

== Death ==
Kälfors died on 16 May 2007. He was interred on 5 June 2007 at Skogskyrkogården.

Diplomatic posts
Preceded by Knut Granstedt	Ambassador of Sweden to the Philippines; 1980–1983	Succeeded by Cecilia Nettelbrandt
Preceded by Finn Bergstrand	Ambassador of Sweden to Mozambique; 1983–1988	Succeeded by Lars-Olof Edström
Preceded by Finn Bergstrand	Ambassador of Sweden to Swaziland; 1983–1986	Succeeded by Lars-Olof Edström
