= Arne Fältheim =

Swedish diplomat (1923–2001)

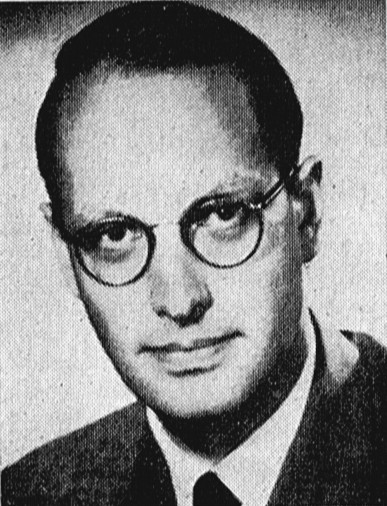
- Born: Kjell Arne Fältheim; 5 August 1923; Helsingborg, Sweden
- Died: 10 July 2001 (aged 77); Arcangues, France
- Education: Lund University; Geneva Graduate Institute
- Occupation: Diplomat
- Years active: 1949–1988
- Spouse: Ulla Wallin (m. 1960)
- Children: 1

Kjell Arne Fältheim (5 August 1923 – 10 July 2001) was a Swedish diplomat. Fältheim began his diplomatic career at the Swedish Ministry for Foreign Affairs in 1949, with early postings in Brussels, Paris, and London. He served as Sweden’s Permanent Representative to the Council of Europe (1971–1976) and was appointed ambassador the same year. He later served as ambassador to Kuala Lumpur and Rangoon (1976–1981), ambassador-at-large for the Indian Ocean (1981–1983), and Sweden's Permanent Representative to UNEP and UN-Habitat in Nairobi (1983–1988). He concluded his career as regional head of the European Union Monitoring Mission in the former Yugoslavia (1991–1994).

== Early life ==
Fältheim was born on 5 August 1923 in Helsingborg, Sweden, the son of Bror Fältheim, an accountant, and his wife Astrid (née Håkansson). He had one sister, Margit Rimborg.

He earned a Master of Political Science degree from Lund University in 1948 and studied at the Graduate Institute in Geneva in 1949.

== Career ==
After completing practical training at the chambers of commerce in London, Paris, and Vienna, Fältheim was appointed attaché at the Ministry for Foreign Affairs in Stockholm in 1949. He served in Brussels in 1950 and at the OEEC delegation in Paris in 1951. In 1956, he returned to the Ministry as secretary. In 1960, he represented Sweden as delegate to the Customs Conference in Geneva. He was then appointed first secretary of the EEC delegation in Brussels in 1962 and became embassy counselor there in 1963. In 1965, he was posted to London as commercial counselor.

He represented Sweden as Permanent Representative to the Council of Europe from 1971 to 1976 and was appointed ambassador in 1971. From 1976 to 1981, he served as ambassador to Kuala Lumpur and Rangoon. Between 1981 and 1983, he was ambassador-at-large for the Indian Ocean, covering Aden, Antananarivo, Mogadishu, Moroni, Port Louis, and Victoria, with his station at the Ministry for Foreign Affairs. From 1983 to 1988, he was posted in Nairobi, overseeing Bujumbura, Kampala, and Kigali, while also serving as Sweden’s Permanent Representative to the United Nations Environment Programme (UNEP) and the United Nations Human Settlements Programme (UN-Habitat). Later, from 1991 to 1994, he was regional head of the European Union Monitoring Mission in the former Yugoslavia.

== Personal life ==
In 1960, Fältheim married Ulla Wallin. They had one son: Marc (born 1963 in Brussels).

After retirement in 1988, he settled with his wife in Arcangues, France.

== Death ==
Fältheim died on 10 July 2001 in Arcangues, France.

== Awards and decorations ==
- (Sweden) For Zealous and Devoted Service of the Realm (22 August 1979)
- (Sweden) Knight of the Order of the Polar Star (1967)
- (Belgium) Knight of the Order of Leopold II

Diplomatic posts
Preceded by Sven Backlund	Permanent Representative of Sweden to the Council of Europe; 1971–1976	Succeeded by Bengt Åkerrén
Preceded by Eric Virgin	Ambassador Sweden to Malaysia; 1976–1981	Succeeded by Bengt Rösiö
Preceded by Eric Virgin	Ambassador Sweden to Burma; 1976–1981	Succeeded by Bengt Rösiö
Preceded by David Wirmark	Ambassador Sweden to Comoros; 1981–1983	Succeeded by Finn Bergstrand
Preceded by Arne Helleryd	Ambassador Sweden to Madagascar; 1981–1983	Succeeded by Finn Bergstrand
Preceded by Arne Helleryd	Ambassador Sweden to Mauritius; 1981–1983	Succeeded by Finn Bergstrand
Preceded by Cecilia Nettelbrandt	Ambassador Sweden to Seychelles; 1982–1983	Succeeded by Finn Bergstrand
Preceded by Arne Helleryd	Ambassador Sweden to South Yemen; 1981–1983	Succeeded by Finn Bergstrand
Preceded by Axel Edelstam	Ambassador Sweden to Somalia; 1981–1983	Succeeded by Finn Bergstrand
Preceded by Cecilia Nettelbrandt	Ambassador Sweden to Kenya; 1983–1988	Succeeded by Nils Revelius
Preceded by Cecilia Nettelbrandt	Ambassador Sweden to Burundi; 1983–1988	Succeeded by Nils Revelius
Preceded by Cecilia Nettelbrandt	Ambassador Sweden to Uganda; 1983–1988	Succeeded by Nils Revelius
Preceded by Cecilia Nettelbrandt	Ambassador Sweden to Rwanda; 1983–1988	Succeeded by Nils Revelius
