= Anders Lidén =

Swedish diplomat

Anders Arvid Lidén (born 2 January 1949 in Oskarshamn, Sweden) was the Permanent Representative of Sweden to the United Nations from 2004 to 2010. He was President of the UNICEF Executive Board in 2008.

== Education ==
Lidén holds a PhD in political science from the Lund University.

== Career ==
In 1979, Lidén joined the Foreign Ministry in Stockholm, and has held numerous posts there, including that of Second Secretary from 1980 to 1983, First Secretary from 1983 to 1991, Counsellor from 1991 to 1992, and Deputy Assistant Under Secretary from 1992 to 1993, and Assistant Under Secretary from 1993 until 1996. He was Chargé d'Affaires at Sweden's Embassy in Jordan in 1999, and served as Sweden's Ambassador to Israel and Cyprus from 1999 to 2002. From 2002 until his appointment to the UN, he served as Director-General for Political Affairs in the Ministry of Foreign Affairs. In 2004, Lidén was named Permanent Representative of Sweden to the United Nations and held that position until 2010. Lidén became ambassador to Zimbabwe from 2010 to 2012 and was subsequently named as the new Swedish ambassador to Finland.

In 2007 Lidén attended a meeting organised by the American Iranian Council which brought together numerous national and international policy makers in an attempt to improve their understanding of Iran's role in Iraq and its nuclear enrichment intentions/capabilities. Others in attendance at this meeting were Congressman Dennis Kucinich (D-OH), Ambassador Javad Zarif from Iran 's UN Mission, Senator Chuck Hagel, Mr. Nicholas Kristof from the New York Times, and a host of other distinguished academics, businessmen, nonprofit representatives and private citizens.

Diplomatic posts
Preceded by John Hagard	Ambassador of Sweden to Israel; 1999–2002	Succeeded by Robert Rydberg
Preceded by John Hagard	Ambassador of Sweden to Cyprus; 1999–2002	Succeeded by Ingemar Lindahl
Preceded by Pierre Schori	Permanent Representative to the United Nations; 2004–2010	Succeeded by Mårten Grunditz
Preceded by Sten Rylander	Ambassador of Sweden to Zimbabwe; 2010–2012	Succeeded by Lars Ronnås
Preceded by Sten Rylander	Ambassador of Sweden to Malawi; 2010–2012	Succeeded by Lars Ronnås
Preceded by Sten Rylander	Ambassador of Sweden to Mauritius; 2010–2012	Succeeded by Lars Ronnås
Preceded by Johan Molander	Ambassador of Sweden to Finland; 2012–2016	Succeeded by Anders Ahnlid
