= List of ambassadors of Sweden to Seychelles =

Ambassador of Sweden to Seychelles
- Lesser coat of arms of the Kingdom of Sweden
- Incumbent; Håkan Åkesson since 2025
- Ministry for Foreign Affairs
- Style: His or Her Excellency (formal); Mr. or Madam Ambassador (informal)
- Reports to: Minister for Foreign Affairs
- Seat: Nairobi, Kenya (Note: The Swedish ambassador to Seychelles is based in Nairobi, Kenya.)
- Appointer: Government of Sweden
- Term length: No fixed term
- Inaugural holder: Cecilia Nettelbrandt
- Formation: 1979

The Ambassador of Sweden to Seychelles (known formally as the Ambassador of the Kingdom of Sweden to the Republic of Seychelles) is the official representative of the government of Sweden to the president of Seychelles and government of Seychelles. Since Sweden does not have an embassy in Victoria, the capital of Seychelles, Sweden's ambassador to Seychelles is based in Nairobi, Kenya.

== History ==
Seychelles declared independence on 29 June 1976. In connection with this, Sweden recognized the new republic. In a telegram to the President of Seychelles, James Mancham, the Minister for Foreign Affairs, Sven Andersson, also conveyed the Swedish government's wishes for prosperity. At the independence celebrations in Seychelles' capital, Victoria, the Swedish government was represented by the chief of protocol at the Ministry for Foreign Affairs, Ambassador Sven Fredrik Hedin.

Three years later, on 14 August 1979, Sweden and Seychelles established diplomatic relations. In the same year, Sweden accredited its first ambassador to Seychelles, resident in Nairobi, Kenya. In 1981, a Stockholm-based ambassador-at-large was appointed for the countries in and around the Indian Ocean region, including Seychelles. Since 1998, the ambassador has been accredited to Victoria, again resident in Nairobi.

== List of representatives ==
Name	Period	Title	Notes	Presented credentials	Ref
Cecilia Nettelbrandt	1979–1981	Ambassador	Resident in Nairobi		
Arne Fältheim	1982–1983	Ambassador	Resident in Stockholm		
Finn Bergstrand	1983–1986	Ambassador	Resident in Stockholm		
Lars Arnö	1986–1988	Ambassador	Resident in Stockholm		
Lars Schönander	1988–1991	Ambassador	Resident in Stockholm		
Krister Göranson	1992–1998	Ambassador	Resident in Stockholm		
Inga Björk-Klevby	1998–2002	Ambassador	Resident in Nairobi		
Bo Göransson	2003–2006	Ambassador	Resident in Nairobi		
Anna Brandt	2006–2009	Ambassador	Resident in Nairobi		
Ann Dismorr	2009–2012	Ambassador	Resident in Nairobi		
Johan Borgstam	2012–2017	Ambassador	Resident in Nairobi		
Anna Jardfelt	2017–2020	Ambassador	Resident in Nairobi	21 March 2018	
Caroline Vicini	2020–2025	Ambassador	Resident in Nairobi	11 May 2021	

== Gallery ==
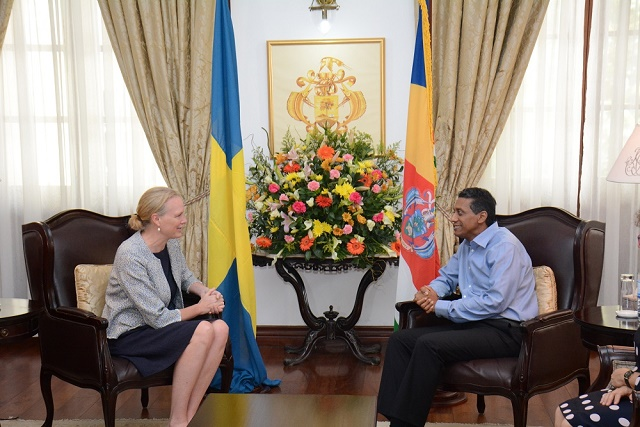
Ambassador Anna Jardfelt (2017–2020) and President Danny Faure.
