= List of ambassadors of Sweden to Madagascar =

Ambassador of Sweden to Madagascar
- Lesser coat of arms of the Kingdom of Sweden
- Incumbent; Andrés Jato since 2025
- Ministry for Foreign Affairs
- Style: His or Her Excellency (formal); Mr. or Madam Ambassador (informal)
- Reports to: Minister for Foreign Affairs
- Seat: Maputo, Mozambique (Note: The Swedish ambassador to Madagascar is based in Maputo, Mozambique.)
- Appointer: Government of Sweden
- Term length: No fixed term
- Inaugural holder: Åke Sjölin
- Formation: August 1961

The Ambassador of Sweden to Madagascar (known formally as the Ambassador of the Kingdom of Sweden to the Republic of Madagascar) is the official representative of the government of Sweden to the president of Madagascar and government of Madagascar. Since Sweden does not have an embassy in Antananarivo, Sweden's ambassador to Madagascar is based in Maputo, Mozambique.

== History ==
On the occasion of the Malagasy Republic's declaration of independence on 26 June 1960, Acting Minister for Foreign Affairs Herman Kling stated in a congratulatory telegram to Madagascar's president and Head of Government, Philibert Tsiranana, that the Swedish government recognized Madagascar as a sovereign and independent state. He expressed the hope for friendly and cordial relations between the two countries. At the same time, King Gustaf VI Adolf sent a congratulatory telegram.

In August 1961, Sweden's ambassador in Addis Ababa, Ethiopia, Åke Sjölin, was appointed ambassador also to Antananarivo, Madagascar. On 7 March 1962, Ambassador Sjölin presented his credentials to the President Philibert Tsiranana.

From 1961 to 1981, the Swedish ambassador in Addis Ababa, Ethiopia, was also accredited to Antananarivo, the capital of Madagascar. In 1981, a Stockholm-based ambassador-at-large for the countries in and around the Indian Ocean, including Madagascar, took over responsibility for the accreditation. In 1999, responsibility was transferred to the Swedish ambassador in Dar es Salaam, Tanzania. In the 2010s, it was transferred to the Swedish ambassador in Maputo, Mozambique.

== List of representatives ==
Name	Period	Title	Notes	Presented credentials	Ref
Malagasy Republic (1958–1975)
Åke Sjölin	August 1961 – 1964	Ambassador	Resident in Addis Ababa	7 March 1962	
Erland Kleen	1964–1967	Ambassador	Resident in Addis Ababa		
Carl Bergenstråhle	1967–1972	Ambassador	Resident in Addis Ababa		
Lars Hedström	1973–1975	Ambassador	Resident in Addis Ababa		
Democratic Republic of Madagascar (1975–1992)
Bengt Friedman	1976–1978	Ambassador	Resident in Addis Ababa		
Arne Helleryd	1978–1981	Ambassador	Resident in Addis Ababa		
Arne Fältheim	1981–1983	Ambassador	Resident in Stockholm		
Finn Bergstrand	1983–1986	Ambassador	Resident in Stockholm		
Lars Arnö	1986–1988	Ambassador	Resident in Stockholm		
Lars Schönander	1989–1991	Ambassador	Resident in Stockholm		
Third Republic of Madagascar (1992–2010)
Krister Göranson	1992–1998	Ambassador	Resident in Stockholm		
Sten Rylander	1999–2003	Ambassador	Resident in Dar es Salaam		
Torvald Åkesson	2003–2007	Ambassador	Resident in Dar es Salaam		
Staffan Herrström	2007–2010	Ambassador	Resident in Dar es Salaam		
Fourth Republic of Madagascar (2010–present)
?	2010–2014	Ambassador			
Irina Schoulgin Nyoni	2014–2017	Ambassador	Resident in Maputo	11 November 2015	
Marie Andersson de Frutos	2017–2020	Ambassador	Resident in Maputo		
Mette Sunnergren	2020–2025	Ambassador	Resident in Maputo	5 February 2025	
Andrés Jato	2025–present	Ambassador	Resident in Maputo		
