= Finn Bergstrand =

Swedish diplomat (born 1932)

- Born: Finn Axel Hilding Bergstrand; 19 June 1932 (age 94); Kalmar, Sweden
- Other name: Måns Ripa
- Education: Katedralskolan; Lund University
- Occupation: Diplomat
- Years active: 1960–1997
- Spouse: Ingrid Ahlgren (m. 1961; died 2025)
- Children: 3

Finn Axel Hilding Bergstrand (born 19 June 1932) is a Swedish diplomat and author whose foreign service career spanned more than thirty years. After studying at Lund University, he joined the Swedish Ministry for Foreign Affairs in the early 1960s and held postings in Washington, D.C. and Beirut. He later served as International Secretary of the Swedish Parliament and was posted to Canberra.

Bergstrand subsequently served at Sweden's delegation to the OECD in Paris and was appointed ambassador to Maputo. As ambassador-at-large for the Indian Ocean region, he represented Sweden in several countries. He later headed the Ministry for Foreign Affairs' Fourth Political Department and served as ambassador to Singapore from 1989 to 1995.

In addition to his diplomatic career, Bergstrand wrote around fifteen detective novels under the pseudonym "Måns Ripa" and published several books under his own name.

== Early life ==
Bergstrand was born on 19 June 1932 in Kalmar, Sweden, the son of Axel Bergstrand, a physician, and Bertha Bergstrand (née Nilsson). He grew up in Söderåkra in Torsås Municipality.

He graduated from Katedralskolan in Lund in 1952, earned a Politices Magister degree from Lund University in 1957, and completed a Licentiate of Philosophy degree in 1961. At the university's Department of Political Science, he was a colleague of the future diplomat Mats Bergquist.

== Career ==
Bergstrand served as a clerk in the Committee on the Constitution from 1960 to 1961, and then joined the Ministry for Foreign Affairs as an attaché from 1961 to 1966. During this period, he was posted to Washington, D.C. (1962–1964) and Beirut (1964–1966). He later worked at the Ministry for Foreign Affairs in Stockholm from 1966 to 1967, before becoming International Secretary of the Swedish Parliament from 1967 to 1971. From 1967 he was also deputy secretary, as well as secretary for international affairs in the Committee on Foreign Affairs.

From 1971 to 1975, he served at the Swedish embassy in Canberra. While in Australia, he was involved in efforts to locate missing Swedish citizens after Cyclone Tracy struck Darwin in late December 1974. He also worked on a possible sale of Swedish Saab Viggen fighter aircraft to Australia, intended to replace the country's French-made Dassault Mirage jets, at a time when the newly elected Labor government's relations with France were strained because of French nuclear weapons testing near Australia.

Bergstrand served at Sweden's delegation to the OECD in Paris from 1975 to 1980, and was then appointed ambassador to Maputo from 1980 to 1983, with concurrent accreditation to Mbabane. In 1983, he was appointed ambassador-at-large for the countries in and around the Indian Ocean, while remaining based at the Ministry for Foreign Affairs in Stockholm. Between 1983 and 1986, he served as ambassador to Aden, Antananarivo, Mogadishu, Moroni, Victoria. During the South Yemeni crisis in January 1986, Bergstrand was in Aden and was evacuated aboard the British royal yacht HMY Britannia.

He served as director (departementsråd) from 1986 to 1989 and headed the Ministry for Foreign Affairs' Fourth Political Department (Pol 4). He was ambassador to Singapore from 1989 to 1995, with concurrent accreditation to Bandar Seri Begawan. From 1995 to 1997, he worked as an Asia consultant at Lund University.

== Personal life ==
Bergstrand married Ingrid Ahlgren, who held a Bachelor of Arts degree, on 12 August 1961 at Ysby Church. She was the daughter of estate owner Oscar Ahlgren and his wife Anna (née Elisson) of Vallberga. The couple had three children: Anna (born 1962), Bo (born 1964), and Niklas (born 1977).

He was a member of the SHT Society and the CC Society in Lund.

After retiring, Bergstrand spent his winters in Lund and his summers at a small cottage outside Söderåkra.

Under the pseudonym "Måns Ripa," Bergstrand wrote around fifteen detective novels. He also authored several books under his own name.

== Bibliography ==
- Bergstrand, Finn (2025). I domens skugga: en kriminalroman [In the Shadow of Judgment: A Crime Novel] (in Swedish). Stockholm: BoD - Books on Demand. ISBN 9789180808958. SELIBR g11rfp47dhnvmv5r.
- Bergstrand, Finn (2023). Innan spåren försvinner: en släktroman [Before the Traces Disappear: A Family Novel] (in Swedish). Stockholm: Ultima Esperanza Books. ISBN 9789198691252. SELIBR 0gnmtrc5xp99wvkv.
- Bergstrand, Finn (2021). Eftertankar: en självbiografi [Reflections: an autobiography] (in Swedish). Stockholm: Ultima Esperanza Books. ISBN 9789198691412. SELIBR hw3drjccf8tl0x6h.
- Bergstrand, Finn (2021). Bryggan: och andra berättelser [The Bridge: and Other Stories] (in Swedish). Stockholm: Ultima Esperanza Books. ISBN 9789188263902. SELIBR r4cnljb3p0wbmj7q.
- Bergstrand, Finn (2020). Buss 121 från Kalmar och andra berättelser [Bus 121 from Kalmar and other stories] (in Swedish). Stockholm: Ultima Esperanza Books. ISBN 9789188263728. SELIBR 3ff4q5d21dr9bjw1.
- Bergstrand, Finn (2016). Släkten Bergstrand från Långasjö [The Bergstrand family from Långasjö] (in Swedish). Stockholm: Ultima Esperanza Books. ISBN 9789188263100. SELIBR 19715053.
- Bergstrand, Finn (2018). Vid vägs ände: en släktberättelse [At the end of the road: a family story] (in Swedish). [Strängnäs]: Ultima Esperanza Books. ISBN 9789188263520. SELIBR 8jnp1xf2648f71gs.
- Bergstrand, Finn (2014). Uträkningen [The calculation] (in Swedish) (1st ed.). Malmö: Orda. ISBN 9789175539218. SELIBR 16412838.
- Bergstrand, Finn (2003). Daco 1931-1937: en svensk tjänstemannarörelse växer fram [Daco 1931-1937: a Swedish white-collar movement emerges]. Tjänstemän & historia, 1652-2702; 2 (in Swedish). Stockholm: TAM-Arkiv. ISBN 9187350408. SELIBR 9054392.
- Bergstrand, Finn (2002). Vem var Johan Månsson? [Who was Johan Månsson?] (in Swedish). Lund: Haneförlaget. SELIBR 8611764.

Diplomatic posts
Preceded by Lennart Dafgård	Ambassador of Sweden to Mozambique; 1980–1983	Succeeded by Bo Kälfors
Preceded by Lennart Dafgård	Ambassador of Sweden to Swaziland; 1980–1983	Succeeded by Bo Kälfors
Preceded by Arne Fältheim	Ambassador of Sweden to the Comoros; 1983–1986	Succeeded by Lars Arnö
Preceded by Arne Fältheim	Ambassador of Sweden to Madagascar; 1983–1986	Succeeded by Lars Arnö
Preceded by Arne Fältheim	Ambassador of Sweden to Mauritius; 1983–1986	Succeeded by Lars Arnö
Preceded by Arne Fältheim	Ambassador of Sweden to Seychelles; 1983–1986	Succeeded by Lars Arnö
Preceded by Arne Fältheim	Ambassador of Sweden to Somalia; 1983–1986	Succeeded by Lars Arnö
Preceded by Arne Fältheim	Ambassador of Sweden to South Yemen; 1983–1986	Succeeded by Lars Arnö
Preceded by Arnold Willén	Ambassador of Sweden to Singapore; 1989–1995	Succeeded by Krister Isaksson
Preceded by Arnold Willén	Ambassador of Sweden to Brunei; 1989–1995	Succeeded by Krister Isaksson
