= List of ambassadors of Sweden to Eswatini =

Ambassador of Sweden to Eswatini
- Lesser coat of arms of the Kingdom of Sweden
- Incumbent; Andrés Jato since 2025
- Ministry for Foreign Affairs; Swedish Embassy, Maputo
- Style: His or Her Excellency (formal); Mr. or Madam Ambassador (informal)
- Reports to: Minister for Foreign Affairs
- Seat: Maputo, Mozambique (Note: The Swedish ambassador in Maputo, Mozambique is also accredited in Mbabane.)
- Appointer: Government of Sweden
- Term length: No fixed term
- Formation: 1970 (Note: According to Uddling & Paabo (1994), Sweden's envoy in Pretoria, Carl Johan Rappe, was accredited to Mbabane between 1970 and 1973. In the 1971 and 1972 editions of the Sveriges statskalender, Swaziland is not listed at all. Swaziland appears for the first time in the 1973 edition, where the posts for Swaziland and South Africa are listed as vacant following Carl Johan Rappe's departure from his post in South Africa.)
- First holder: Carl Johan Rappe

The Ambassador of Sweden to Eswatini (known formally as the Ambassador of the Kingdom of Sweden to the Kingdom of Eswatini) is the official representative of the government of Sweden to the king of Eswatini and government of Eswatini. Since Sweden does not have an embassy in Mbabane, Sweden's ambassador in Maputo, Mozambique, is also accredited to Mbabane, the capital of Eswatini.

== History ==
On the occasion of the proclamation of Swaziland's independence on 6 September 1968, Foreign Minister Torsten Nilsson declared in a congratulatory telegram to Prince Makhosini Dlamini, Prime Minister of Swaziland, that the Swedish government recognized Swaziland as a sovereign and independent state. He expressed the Swedish government's desire to maintain friendly and cordial relations with Swaziland. Sweden was represented at the official ceremonies held from 4–8 September 1968 in Mbabane by Envoy Eric Virgin, who had been tasked with conveying the Swedish King's congratulations.

A few years later, Sweden's envoy in Pretoria was also accredited to Swaziland's capital, Mbabane. From 1977 onward, Sweden's ambassador in Maputo, Mozambique, was also accredited to Swaziland, which has been known as Eswatini since 2018.

== List of representatives ==
Name	Period	Title	Resident / Concurrent accreditation	Notes	Presented credentials	Ref
Kingdom of Swaziland (–2018)
Carl Johan Rappe	1970–1973	Envoy	Resident in Pretoria			
Lennart Westerberg	1973–1977	Envoy	Resident in Pretoria			
Lennart Dafgård	1977–1980	Ambassador	Resident in Maputo			
Finn Bergstrand	1980–1983	Ambassador	Resident in Maputo			
Bo Kälfors	1983–1988	Ambassador	Resident in Maputo			
Lars-Olof Edström	1988–1991	Ambassador	Resident in Maputo			
Birgitta Johansson	1992–1994	Ambassador	Resident in Maputo			
Helena Ödmark	1995–1997	Ambassador	Resident in Maputo			
Erik Åberg	1997–2002	Ambassador	Resident in Maputo			
Maj-Inger Klingvall	2003–2006	Ambassador	Resident in Maputo			
Torvald Åkesson	2007–2011	Ambassador	Resident in Maputo			
Ulla Andrén	2011–2014	Ambassador	Resident in Maputo			
Irina Schoulgin Nyoni	2014–2017	Ambassador	Resident in Maputo		30 July 2015	
Marie Andersson de Frutos	2017–2018	Ambassador	Resident in Maputo			
Kingdom of Eswatini (2018–present)
Marie Andersson de Frutos	2018–2020	Ambassador	Resident in Maputo			
Mette Sunnergren	2020–2025	Ambassador	Resident in Maputo		8 August 2022	
Andrés Jato	2025–present	Ambassador	Resident in Maputo			
