= Carl-George Crafoord =

Swedish diplomat (1921–2006)

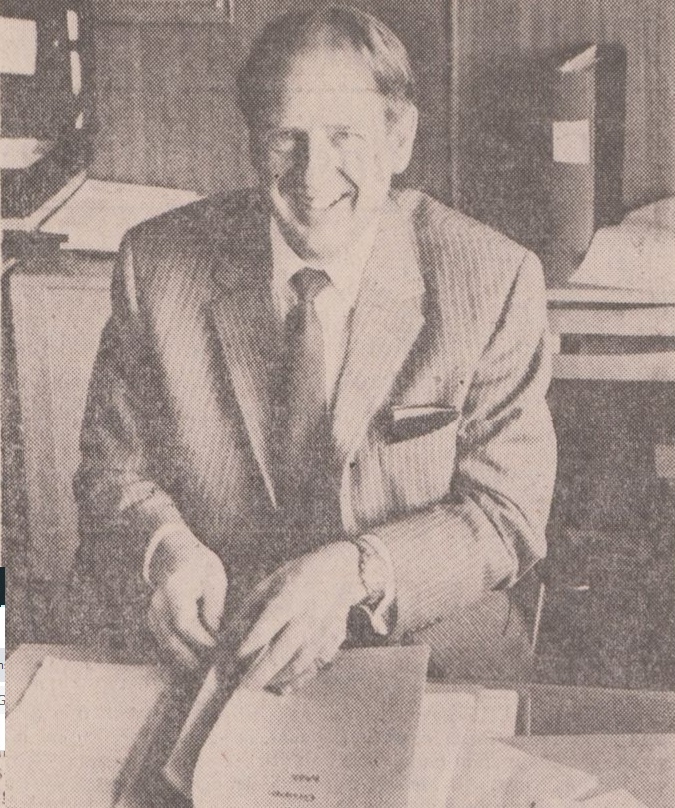
- Carl-George Crafoord as ambassador in Nairobi in 1969
- Born: Carl-George Wilhelm Crafoord; 3 September 1921; Stockholm, Sweden
- Died: 10 July 2006 (aged 84); Viken, Sweden
- Education: Stockholm University College
- Occupation: Diplomat
- Years active: 1945–1986
- Spouse(s): Lena Haegermark (m. 1946) Anne Hedlund (m. 1969)
- Children: 5
- Relatives: Harald Hægermark (father-in-law)

Carl-George "CG" Wilhelm Crafoord (3 September 1921 – 10 July 2006) was a Swedish diplomat. Crafoord had a long career in the Swedish diplomatic service. After studying law and working as a cryptographist during World War II, he began his diplomatic career in 1945. He held postings in Washington, Buenos Aires, Santiago, Tokyo, Seoul, and Bonn, and served as ambassador to Kenya, Uganda, Czechoslovakia, and Spain. In Stockholm, he played a key role in negotiating textile trade agreements and served as deputy state secretary for foreign affairs. He was also active in the United Nations and in Sweden’s foreign trade policy. Outside his official duties, Crafoord was a committed Rotarian and a keen hunter. After retiring in 1986, he continued to support Swedish businesses from Spain.

== Early life ==
Crafoord was born on 3 September 1921 in Stockholm, Sweden, the son of Colonel Casa Crafoord and his wife Elsa (née Kumlin). His brothers were Colonel John Crafoord and psychiatrist Clarence Crafoord. He passed his studentexamen in 1940 and served during his mandatory military service for a period during the years 1942 to 1943 at the legation in London as a cryptographist. Crafoord continued as cryptographist at the Ministry for Foreign Affairs in Stockholm during the remainder of the war, alongside his law studies. At age 22 in 1944, he was sent to Åland as deputy consul. Crafoord took a Candidate of Law degree in Stockholm in 1945 and became attache in June 1945 at the Foreign Ministry's press agency.

== Career ==
Crafoord served in Washington, D.C. in 1946, Buenos Aires in 1948 and was second secretary in Buenos Aires in 1950. He also had a sojourn in Santiago as a member of Sweden's delegation to the first meeting with the United Nations Economic and Social Council (ECOSOC) before returning to the Foreign Ministry in 1951. Crafoord served at the UN agency of the Foreign Ministry's political department and then with bilateral issues in the trade department. He was then first secretary at the Foreign Ministry in 1953, Tokyo in 1955 and in Seoul in 1959 and was the first secretary at the Foreign Ministry in 1960. Crafoord was then director at the Foreign Ministry in 1962, commercial counsellor in Bonn in 1964, ambassador in Nairobi in 1968 (with dual accreditation in Kampala from 1969), Prague in 1973 and served in the common foreign trade departments at the Foreign Ministry and at the Ministry of Commerce in 1976. He was head of the PA-unit at the Foreign Ministry in 1977, was deputy state secretary for foreign affairs in 1978 and ambassador in Madrid from 1980 to 1986.

Crafoord's perhaps greatest efforts was during the periods he served in Stockholm at the trading area where he negotiated textile limitation agreements. Crafoord became over the years an avid Rotarian, and co-founded a Rotary Club in Nairobi as well as in Stockholm. One of his main interests were hunting. Crafoord also came to engage deeply in the case of Karolina Johnsson (daughter of ambassador Lave Johnsson), a Swedish citizen accused of attempting to smuggle heroin from Bangkok. After retiring in 1986, he and his wife Anne lived part of the year in San Pedro de Alcántara, Spain, where he for some years had assignments for different Swedish companies.

== Personal life ==
In 1946 Crafoord married Lena Hægermark (1923–2012), the daughter of Lieutenant General Harald Hægermark and Aina Tour. He was the father of Carl (born 1948), Eva (born 1950), Patrick (born 1953), Cecilia (born 1957), and John (born 1960). In 1969, Crafoord married Anne Hedlund (born 1937), the daughter of attorney Knut Hedlund and Anna-Lisa Nilsson.

== Death ==
Crafoord died on 10 July 2006 in Viken, Sweden. The funeral service was held in Viken Church. He was interred on 3 September 2006 at Åkers Cemetery in Åkers styckebruk, Strängnäs Municipality.

== Awards ==
- (Sweden) Knight of the Order of the Polar Star
- (Spain) Knights Grand Cross of the Order of Isabella the Catholic
- (Japan) Commander of the Order of the Sacred Treasure
- (Argentina) Officer of the Order of May
- (Sweden) Landstorm' silver medal

== Bibliography ==
- Crafoord, Carl-George (2006). Frimärket från Kina: hågkomster från när och fjärran [Stamp from China: recollections from near and far] (in Swedish). Stockholm: Jure. ISBN 9172232595. SELIBR 10228783.

Diplomatic posts
Preceded by Carl Gustaf Béve	Ambassador of Sweden to Kenya; 1968–1973	Succeeded by Lennart Rydfors
Preceded by Carl Gustaf Béve	Ambassador of Sweden to Uganda; 1969–1973	Succeeded by Lennart Rydfors
Preceded by Agda Rössel	Ambassador of Sweden to Czechoslovakia; 1973–1976	Succeeded by Marc Giron
Preceded by Lennart Petri	Ambassador of Sweden to Spain; 1980–1986	Succeeded by Karl-Anders Wollter
Civic offices
Preceded by Bengt Rabaeus	Deputy State Secretary for Foreign Affairs; 1978–1980	Succeeded by Margareta Hegardt
