= Cecilia Nettelbrandt =

Swedish politician (1922–2009)

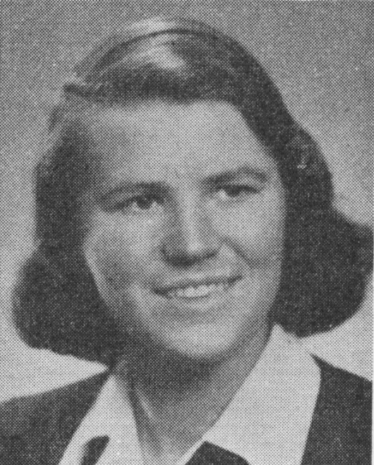
- Born: Cecilia Aina Bergens; 27 June 1922; Östersund, Sweden
- Died: 24 February 2009 (aged 86); Bromma, Sweden
- Education: Stockholm School of Economics; Stockholm University College
- Occupations: Politician, diplomat
- Years active: 1945–1993
- Spouse: Alfred Nettelbrandt (m. 1946)
- Children: 3

Cecilia Aina Nettelbrandt, née Bergens (27 June 1922 – 24 February 2009) was a Swedish politician (Liberals). She was MP of the Second Chamber of the Parliament of Sweden from 1961 to 1976.

== Early life ==
Nettelbrandt was born on 27 June 1922 in Östersund, Sweden, the daughter of Emanuel Bergens and his wife Ester (née Johansson). She received a Civilekonom degree from Stockholm School of Economics in 1945 and a Candidate of Law degree from Stockholm University College in 1951.

== Career ==
=== Legal and diplomatic career ===
Nettelbrandt worked as a teaching assistant in the National Swedish Board of Vocational and Technical Education (Överstyrelsen för yrkesutbildning) from 1945 to 1948, as an assistant master from 1948 to 1950, an assistant jurist from 1951 to 1953, and as a union lawyer in the Swedish Union of Teachers (Sveriges lärarförbund) from 1953 to 1970. She served as consul general in San Francisco including 10 states in the Western United States from 1976 to 1978. After just two years as Consul General in San Francisco, Nettelbrandt was appointed ambassador to Kenya. During those two years, there had been quite a bit of controversy surrounding the Consulate General in San Francisco. Nettelbrandt, among other things, has been accused of not being knowledgeable and diplomatic enough. The conflict primarily occurred between Nettelbrandt and Consul Per Ström, leading to an investigation by the Chancellor of Justice, Ingvar Gullnäs. Nettelbrandt received criticism for making extensive additions to a protocol from a consultation meeting when the protocol was supposed to be adjusted. She also instructed the recorder not to report a matter that had been discussed at another consultation meeting.

Nettelbrandt went on and served as ambassador to Kenya, Rwanda, Burundi, Uganda, and the Seychelles from 1978 to 1983, and ambassador to the Philippines from 1983 to 1987.

=== Other work ===
Nettelbrandt served as a member of the City Council in Solna from 1951 to 1962 and again from 1965 to 1966. Additionally, she was a board member of the Swedish Federation of Business and Professional Women (Yrkeskvinnors Samarbetsförbund, YSF) from 1952 to 1962, chairing the same organization from 1962 to 1968. Furthermore, she held the position of vice president in the International Federation of Business and Professional Women from 1965 to 1971.

She was an active member of the Liberal People's Party, serving on its party board from 1958 to 1976, including a role as vice party leader from 1967 to 1976. Nettelbrandt's political career extended to the Swedish Parliament, where she served as a Member of Parliament from 1961 to 1976. In this capacity, she held the position of Second Deputy Speaker of the Riksdag from 1971 to 1976, and she was also the vice chairman of the Committee on Foreign Affairs.

Her involvement in various committees and boards included membership in the Swedish Commission for the Introduction of Right-Hand Driving (Statens högertrafikkommission) from 1963 to 1967, the board of Foreningen Norden from 1968 to 1976, Sveriges Radio from 1969 to 1973, Trygg-Hansa from 1970 to 1976, the Corporate Tax Inquiry (företagsskatteutredningen) from 1970 to 1976, the Tax Inquiry (skatteutredningen) from 1972 to 1974, Nordic Council from 1971 to 1973, and the Board of Governors of the Sveriges Riksbank from 1970 to 1976. She also served as the chairman of the Swedish-German Language Foundation within the Swedish Trade Council from 1988 to 1993.

== Personal life ==
In 1946, she married Alfred Nettelbrandt (1918–2010), the son of Isak Nettelbrandt and Selma (née Magnusson). They had three children: Guje (born 1947), Carita (born 1947), and Dick (born 1954).

Diplomatic posts
| Preceded by Hans-Efraim Sköld | Consul-general of Sweden to San Francisco; 1976–1978 | Succeeded by Fredrik Bergenstråhle |
| Preceded by Lennart Rydfors | Ambassador of Sweden to Kenya; 1978–1983 | Succeeded by Arne Fältheim |
| Preceded by Lennart Rydfors | Ambassador of Sweden to Rwanda; 1978–1983 | Succeeded by Arne Fältheim |
| Preceded by Lennart Rydfors | Ambassador of Sweden to Burundi; 1978–1983 | Succeeded by Arne Fältheim |
| Preceded by Lennart Rydfors | Ambassador of Sweden to Uganda; 1979–1983 | Succeeded by Arne Fältheim |
| Preceded by None | List of ambassadors of Sweden to Seychelles; 1979–1981 | Succeeded by Arne Fältheim |
| Preceded by Bo Kälfors | Ambassador of Sweden to the Philippines; 1983–1987 | Succeeded by Hans Grönwall |
