= List of ambassadors of Sweden to the Comoros =

Ambassador of Sweden to the Comoros
- Lesser coat of arms of the Kingdom of Sweden
- Incumbent; Håkan Åkesson since 2025
- Ministry for Foreign Affairs
- Style: His or Her Excellency (formal); Mr. or Madam Ambassador (informal)
- Reports to: Minister for Foreign Affairs
- Seat: Nairobi, Kenya (Note: The Swedish ambassador to the Comoros is based in Nairobi, Kenya.)
- Appointer: Government of Sweden
- Term length: No fixed term
- Inaugural holder: Lennart Eckerberg
- Formation: 1977

The Ambassador of Sweden to the Comoros (known formally as the Ambassador of the Kingdom of Sweden to Union of the Comoros) is the official representative of the government of Sweden to the president of the Comoros and government of the Comoros. Since Sweden does not have an embassy in Moroni, the capital of the Comoros, Sweden's ambassador to the Comoros is based in Nairobi, Kenya.

== History ==
The Comoros declared independence on 6 July 1975. Two years later, Sweden accredited its first ambassador to the Comoros' capital, Moroni, resident in Dar es Salaam, Tanzania. In 1981, a Stockholm-based ambassador-at-large was appointed for the countries in and around the Indian Ocean region, including the Comoros. Since 1998, Sweden's ambassador accredited to Moroni is resident in Nairobi, Kenya.

== List of representatives ==
Name	Period	Title	Resident / Concurrent accreditation	Notes	Presented credentials	Ref
State of the Comoros (1975–1978)
Lennart Eckerberg	1977–1978	Ambassador	Resident in Dar es Salaam			
Federal Islamic Republic of the Comoros (1978–2001)
Lennart Eckerberg	1978–1979	Ambassador	Resident in Dar es Salaam			
David Wirmark	1979–1981	Ambassador	Resident in Dar es Salaam			
Arne Fältheim	1981–1983	Ambassador	Resident in Stockholm			
Finn Bergstrand	1983–1986	Ambassador	Resident in Stockholm			
Lars Arnö	1987–1988	Ambassador	Resident in Stockholm			
Lars Schönander	1988–1991	Ambassador	Resident in Stockholm			
Krister Göranson	1992–1998	Ambassador	Resident in Stockholm			
Inga Björk-Klevby	1998–2001	Ambassador	Resident in Nairobi			
Union of the Comoros (2001–present)
Inga Björk-Klevby	2001–2002	Ambassador	Resident in Nairobi			
Bo Göransson	2003–2006	Ambassador	Resident in Nairobi			
Anna Brandt	2006–2009	Ambassador	Resident in Nairobi			
Ann Dismorr	2009–2012	Ambassador	Resident in Nairobi			
Johan Borgstam	2012–2017	Ambassador	Resident in Nairobi			
Anna Jardfelt	2017–2020	Ambassador	Resident in Nairobi		13 January 2018	
Caroline Vicini	2020–2025	Ambassador	Resident in Nairobi		5 September 2022	
