= List of ambassadors of Sweden to Mozambique =

Ambassador of Sweden to Mozambique
- Lesser coat of arms of the Kingdom of Sweden
- Incumbent; Andrés Jato since 2025
- Ministry for Foreign Affairs; Swedish Embassy, Maputo
- Style: His or Her Excellency (formal); Mr. or Madam Ambassador (informal)
- Reports to: Minister for Foreign Affairs
- Seat: Maputo, Mozambique
- Appointer: Government of Sweden
- Term length: No fixed term
- Inaugural holder: Knut Granstedt
- Formation: 1975
- Website: Swedish Embassy, Maputo

The Ambassador of Sweden to Mozambique (known formally as the Ambassador of the Kingdom of Sweden to the Republic of Mozambique) is the official representative of the government of Sweden to the president of Mozambique and government of Mozambique. The ambassador usually has a dual accreditation to Mbabane, Eswatini.

== History ==
In April 1975, Sweden and Mozambique agreed to establish diplomatic relations in anticipation of Mozambique's independence on 25 June 1975. The formal announcement was made later that month during a visit to Sweden by FRELIMO's vice chairman, Marcelino dos Santos.

Sweden formally recognized the People's Republic of Mozambique on its Independence Day, 25 June 1975. The decision was conveyed in a telegram from Sweden's Foreign Minister, Sven Andersson, to his Mozambican counterpart. In the telegram, Andersson also extended the Swedish government's congratulations and best wishes for the future. At the independence celebrations in Mozambique's capital, Lourenço Marques, the Swedish government was represented by Hans Gustafsson, the minister for physical planning and local government.

Sweden's ambassador in Dar es Salaam, Tanzania, Knut Granstedt, was also accredited as ambassador to Mozambique. He presented his credentials to President Samora Machel on 29 June 1975, at the presidential palace, Palácio da Ponta Vermelha. Beginning in 1976, an embassy counselor was stationed in Maputo and served as chargé d’affaires ad interim whenever the ambassador in Dar es Salaam was absent. From 1977 onward, Sweden had a resident ambassador in Maputo which also had a dual accreditation to Mbabane, Swaziland (now Eswatini).

== List of representatives ==
Name	Period	Title	Notes	Presented credentials	Ref
People's Republic of Mozambique (1975–1990)
Knut Granstedt	1975–1977	Ambassador	Resident in Dar es Salaam.	29 June 1975	
Göran Hasselmark	1976–1977	Chargé d'affaires ad interim (Note: Held the diplomatic rank of embassy counselor.)			
Lennart Dafgård	1977–1980	Ambassador	Also accredited in Mbabane.		
Finn Bergstrand	1980–1983	Ambassador	Also accredited in Mbabane.		
Bo Kälfors	1983–1988	Ambassador	Also accredited in Mbabane.		
Lars-Olof Edström	1988–1990	Ambassador	Also accredited in Mbabane.		
Republic of Mozambique (1990–present)
Lars-Olof Edström	1990–1991	Ambassador	Also accredited in Mbabane.		
Birgitta Johansson	1991–1994	Ambassador	Also accredited in Mbabane (from 1992).		
Helena Ödmark	1995–1997	Ambassador	Also accredited in Mbabane.		
Erik Åberg	1997–2002	Ambassador	Also accredited in Mbabane.		
Johan Holmberg	2002–2003	Chargé d'affaires ad interim			
Maj-Inger Klingvall	2003–2007	Ambassador	Also accredited in Mbabane (until 2006).		
Torvald Åkesson	2007–2011	Ambassador	Also accredited in Mbabane.		
Ulla Andrén	July 2011 – August 2014	Ambassador	Also accredited in Mbabane.		
Irina Schoulgin Nyoni	2014–2017	Ambassador	Also accredited to Antananarivo and Mbabane.	22 September 2014	
Marie Andersson de Frutos	1 September 2017 – 2020	Ambassador	Also accredited to Antananarivo.	18 October 2017	
Mette Sunnergren	1 September 2020 – 2025	Ambassador	Also accredited in Antananarivo and Mbabane.	22 October 2020 (Note: Presdented credentials on 22 October 2020 to President Filipe Nyusi but also on 9 October 2020 to Minister of Foreign Affairs Verónica Macamo.)	
Andrés Jato	2025–present	Ambassador			
