= Manama High School =

School in Manama, Zimbabwe

Coordinates: 21.559°S 28.992°E

Location
- Manama, Gwanda District, Matabeleland South Province; Zimbabwe

Information
- School type: Mission School
- Religious affiliation(s): Lutheran

Manama High School is a Lutheran mission school at Manama in Gwanda District, Zimbabwe.

The school had a girls' football team that competed in the Norway Cup in 2010.
