= Permanent Representative of Sweden to the United Nations in Geneva =

Permanent Representative of Sweden to the United Nations and other International Organisations in Geneva
- Lesser coat of arms of the Kingdom of Sweden

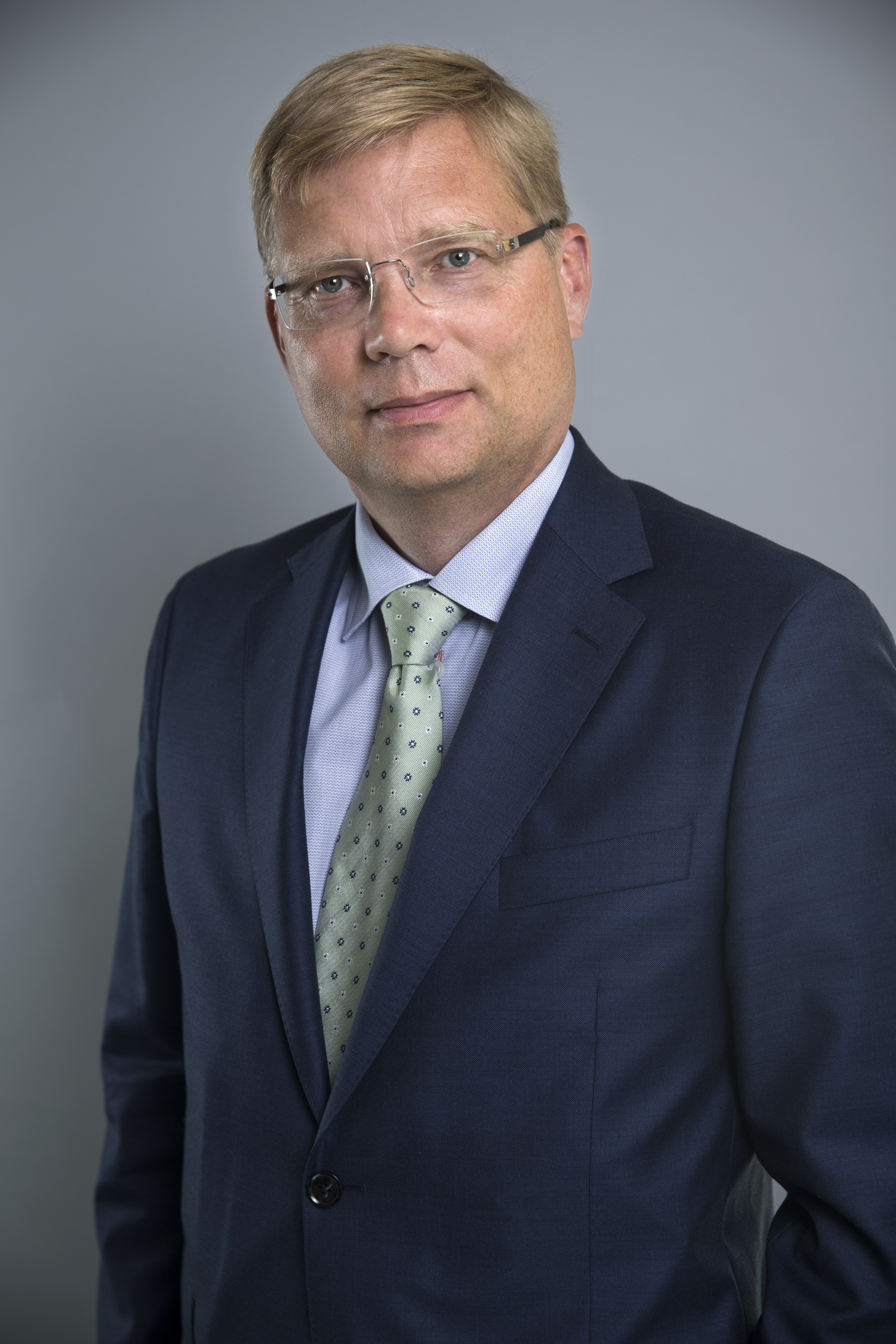
- Incumbent; Magnus Hellgren since 2024
- Ministry for Foreign Affairs; Permanent Mission of Sweden in Geneva
- Style: His or Her Excellency (formal); Mr. or Madam Ambassador (informal)
- Reports to: Minister for Foreign Affairs
- Seat: Rue de Lausanne 82; CH-1211 Geneva 20; Switzerland
- Appointer: Government of Sweden
- Term length: No fixed term
- Formation: 1 April 1952
- First holder: Torsten Björck
- Website: www.swedenabroad.se/en/embassies/un-geneva/

The Permanent Representative of Sweden to the United Nations and other International Organisations in Geneva is the head of the Permanent Mission of Sweden in Geneva (Note: The Swedish representation goes by several different names: Permanent Mission of Sweden in Geneva; Permanent Mission of Sweden, Geneva; Permanent Mission of Sweden to the United Nations; Permanent Mission of Sweden to the United Nations Office and other international organizations in Geneva; Permanent Mission of Sweden to the United Nations and other international organisations in Geneva) (Swedish: Sveriges ständiga representation vid de internationella organisationerna i Genève) which represents Sweden at the United Nations Office at Geneva and other international organizations in Geneva, Switzerland.

== History ==
Torsten Björck, acting first secretary at the Swedish legation in Bern, was appointed to serve in Geneva from 1 April 1952, until further notice as the Swedish delegate for international cooperation matters. This made him the first head of the Swedish presence in Geneva, which over the years came to be known by several different names. (Note: The Swedish presence in Geneva has gone under several different names over the years: 1952–1955: Permanent Delegation of Sweden for International Cooperation (Swedish: Sveriges ständiga delegation for internationellt samarbete).; 1956–1963: Permanent Representation of Sweden to the European Office of the United Nations (Swedish: Sveriges ständiga representation vid Förenta Nationernas Europakontor; French: Représentation permanente de la Suède auprès de l'Office européen des Nations Unies).; 1964–1993: Permanent Delegation of Sweden to the International Organizations in Geneva (Swedish: Sveriges ständiga delegation hos/vid de internationella organisationerna i Genève; French: Délégation Permanente de la Suède auprès des Organisations Internationales à Genève); 1994–present: Permanent Representation of Sweden to the International Organizations in Geneva (Swedish: Sveriges ständiga representation vid de internationella organisationerna i Genève; French: Mission Permanente de la Suède auprès de l'office des Nations Unies et des autres organisations, internationales à Genève).)

== Tasks ==
Sweden's Permanent Mission in Geneva is led by the head of mission, an official with the diplomatic rank of ambassador who serves as the permanent representative to the United Nations Office at Geneva and other international organizations. The deputy head of mission represents Sweden at the World Trade Organization (WTO). The mission also includes eleven officials seconded from the Ministry for Foreign Affairs, along with eight locally employed staff. Its work is primarily divided into five areas: international trade; international humanitarian affairs, refugee issues, and migration; disarmament and non-proliferation efforts; human rights; and global health.

== List of permanent representatives ==
Name	Period	Title	Notes	Ref
Permanent Delegation of Sweden for International Cooperation (1952–1955)
Torsten Björck	1 April 1952 – 1955	First legation secretary		
Permanent Representation of Sweden to the European Office of the United Nations (1955–1963)
Per Bertil Kollberg	1955–1959	First secretary		
Carl Henrik von Platen	1959–1963	Ambassador (Note: Envoy 1959–1960, Ambassador 1960–1963.)		
Permanent Delegation of Sweden to the International Organizations in Geneva (1963–1993)
Erik von Sydow	1964–1972	Ambassador		
Karl-Gustav Lagerfelt	1972–1975	Ambassador		
Carl De Geer	1975–1979	Ambassador		
Hans Ewerlöf	1980–1986	Ambassador		
Lars Anell	1986–1992	Ambassador		
Arnold Willén	1992–1993	Ambassador		
Permanent Representation of Sweden to the International Organizations in Geneva (1994–present)
Lars Norberg	1993–1998	Ambassador		
Johan Molander	1998–2003	Ambassador		
Elisabet Borsiin Bonnier	2003–2007	Ambassador		
Hans Dahlgren	2007–2010	Ambassador	Presented credentials on 3 September 2007.	
Jan Knutsson	2010–2015	Ambassador	Presented credentials on 8 September 2010.	
Veronika Bard Bringéus	2015–2020	Ambassador	Presented credentials on 3 September 2015.	
Anna Jardfelt	September 2020 – 2024	Ambassador	Presented credentials on 1 September 2020.	
Magnus Hellgren	2024–present	Ambassador	Presented credentials on 19 August 2024.	

== See also ==
- Permanent Representative of Sweden to the United Nations
