= Anna Jardfelt =

Swedish Ambassador

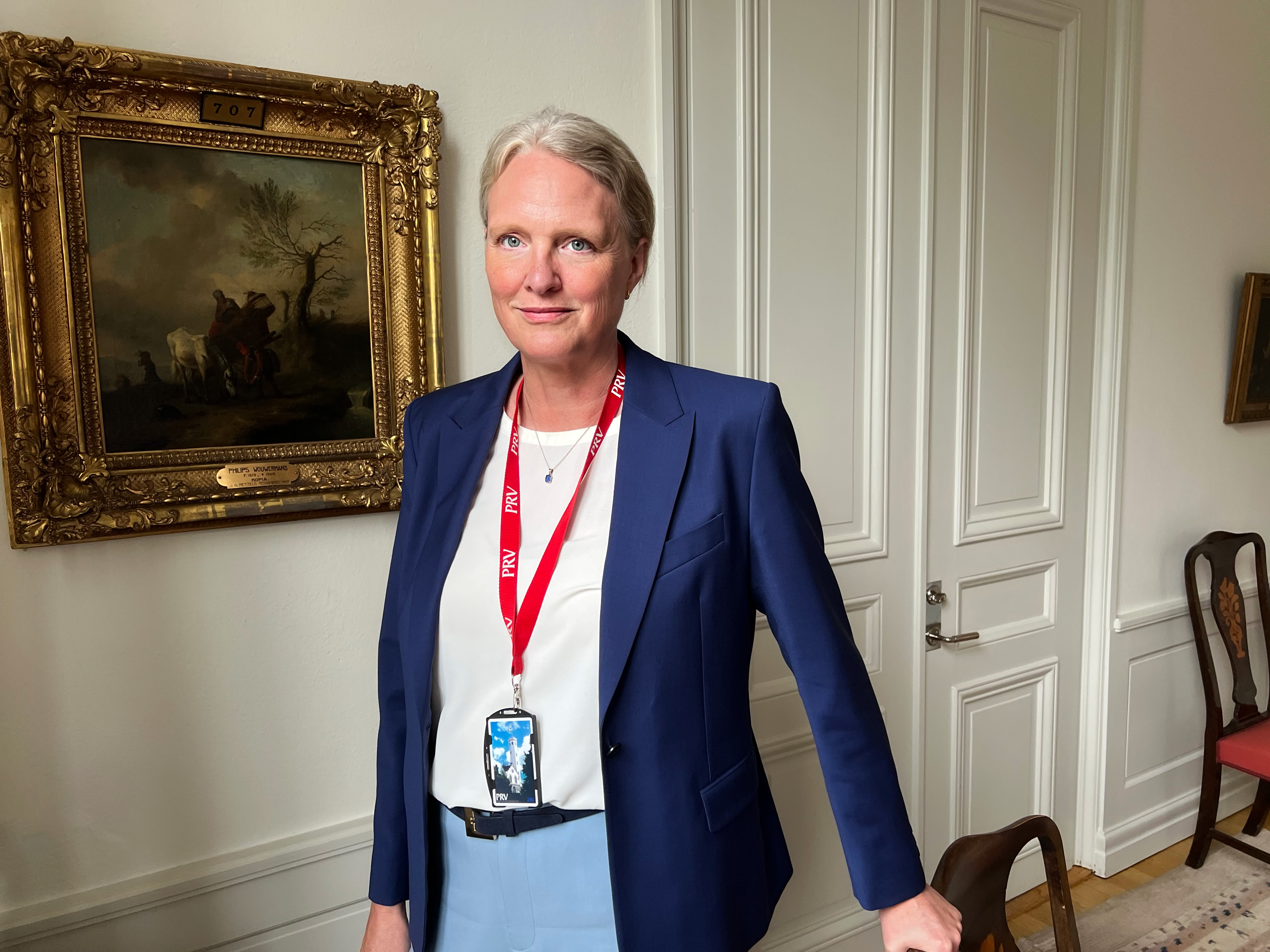
- Born: Anna Dagny Elisabet Jardfelt; 20 March 1972 (age 54)
- Occupations: Diplomat, civil servant
- Spouse: Neil Melvin
- Children: 2

Anna Dagny Elisabet Melvin, née Jardfelt (born 20 March 1972) is the director general of Swedish Intellectual Property Office since 2024 and a former Swedish diplomat. She has served as Ambassador of Sweden to Kenya (2017–2020) with dual accreditation to Seychelles and the Comoros, as well as the Permanent Representative of Sweden to the United Nations in Geneva (2020–2024)

== Education ==
Jardfelt Melvin holds a masters of law degree.

== Career ==
Jardfelt Melvin's law degree has a specialisation in international law. She joined the Swedish Foreign Ministry in 1997 and has spent a large part of her career on European Security policy issues, notably as advisor for the OSCE High Commissioner on National Minorities (2001–2005).

She was the Director of the Swedish Institute of International Affairs (UI) between 2010 and 2014.

Jardfelt served as Ambassador to the EU's Political and Security Committee in Brussels between 2014 and 2017. She was Ambassador of Sweden to Kenya, Seychelles and the Comoros and Permanent Representative to the United Nations Environment Programme (UNEP) and United Nations Human Settlements Programme (UN-HABITAT) from 2017 to 2020. In March 2018 she presented her credentials to President Danny Faure as the Ambassador to the Seychelles. Later that year she wrote about an initiative in Kenya to encourage pregnant women and mothers to attend check-ups to reduce infant mortality. The programme had begun in 2014 with an initial objective of supplying milk but had moved on to providing money to women as they became mothers. It was organised by the County Government of Kakamega and supported by UNICEF and the Swedish embassy.

Jardfelt became the Swedish ambassador in Geneva in 2020. In 2021 she became the chair of the International Labour organisation succeeding Apurva Chandra of India.

== Private life ==
Jardfelt is married with two children.

== Other activities ==
- United Nations Institute for Training and Research (UNITAR), Member of the Board of Trustees (since 2021)
- European Leadership Network (ELN), Member

Diplomatic posts
Preceded by Johan Borgstam	Ambassador of Sweden to Kenya; 2017–2020	Succeeded by Caroline Vicini
Preceded by Johan Borgstam	Ambassador of Sweden to Seychelles; 2017–2020	Succeeded by Caroline Vicini
Preceded by Johan Borgstam	Ambassador of Sweden to the Comoros; 2017–2020	Succeeded by Caroline Vicini
Preceded by Veronika Bard Bringéus	Permanent Representative of Sweden to the United Nations in Geneva; 2020–2024	Succeeded by Magnus Hellgren
