= Embassy of Sweden, Harare =

Diplomatic mission of Sweden in Zimbabwe

- Location: Harare
- Address: 32 Aberdeen Road; Avondale, Harare
- Coordinates: 17.79133°S 31.03458°E
- Opened: 1980
- Closed: 2026
- Ambassador: Per Lindgärde
- Jurisdiction: Zimbabwe; Malawi; Mauritius
- Website: Official website

The Embassy of Sweden in Harare was Sweden's diplomatic mission in Zimbabwe from 1980 until its closure in 2026. Sweden established diplomatic relations with Zimbabwe immediately after its independence in April 1980, with the embassy becoming an important centre for political relations and development cooperation.

The embassy worked on political dialogue, trade and investment, development cooperation, human rights, democracy, gender equality, climate and environmental issues, as well as consular assistance to Swedish citizens. It also had a regional role, with the Swedish ambassador accredited to Malawi and Mauritius.

Swedish development cooperation with Zimbabwe began in 1980 and expanded significantly over the following decades. Under the 2022–2026 strategy, Sweden allocated approximately SEK 1.65 billion, focusing mainly on human rights and democracy, climate and the environment, and inclusive economic development.

In December 2025, Sweden decided to close the embassy during 2026 as part of a broader reorientation of foreign and development policy, including a stronger focus on supporting Ukraine. The closure was not linked to any specific development in Zimbabwe. Sweden planned to maintain relations with Zimbabwe, with greater emphasis on trade, investment, sustainable growth, climate and human rights.

== History ==
Between 1936 and 1965, Sweden had an honorary consul and clerk in Salisbury. The consulate, which was under the jurisdiction of the Consulate General in Nairobi, was established to serve Southern Rhodesia and Nyasaland. It was closed following Rhodesia's unilateral declaration of independence in 1964.

Sweden recognized Zimbabwe as a sovereign and independent state on 18 April 1980, in connection with its declaration of independence. On that occasion, Prime Minister Thorbjörn Fälldin sent a congratulatory telegram to Zimbabwe's new Prime Minister, Robert Mugabe, conveying the Swedish government's best wishes. He also expressed hopes for strong and lasting relations between Sweden and Zimbabwe.

A month earlier, it had been reported that Sweden planned to request accreditation for a chargé d'affaires in time for Zimbabwe's independence day celebrations, with the intention of opening an embassy in the country shortly thereafter. That same month, Bo Heinebäck took over operations at the liaison office in Salisbury. Sweden established diplomatic relations with the new state immediately upon its independence, having already nominated Heinebäck as ambassador.

The year 1980 also marked the starting point for modern Swedish development cooperation with Zimbabwe. Following Zimbabwe's independence in 1980, development assistance expanded, focusing among other things on health and education. Sweden's development cooperation in Zimbabwe was channelled through civil society organisations, as well as multilateral and international organisations. Sweden's development cooperation strategy for Zimbabwe for the period 2022–2026 amounted to a total of SEK 1.65 billion. The main areas were human rights, democracy, the rule of law and gender equality; the environment, climate and sustainable use of natural resources; and inclusive economic development.

During the 2000s, the embassy in Harare also took on a regional role. From 2002, Sweden's ambassador to Zimbabwe was concurrently accredited to Malawi and Mauritius, meaning that the embassy also served as Sweden's diplomatic base for relations with these countries.

On 5 December 2025, the Swedish government decided to close the Swedish embassy in Zimbabwe during 2026, alongside the embassies in Bolivia and Liberia. The decision was part of a broader shift in Sweden's foreign and development assistance priorities, including an increased focus on support for Ukraine, which had become the government's main foreign and development policy priority. The closure of the embassies was carried out in parallel with the phasing out of bilateral development cooperation strategies for the three countries. The phase-outs were intended to free up additional resources for support to Ukraine. The decision concerning Zimbabwe was not linked to any specific events or developments in the country.

Despite the closure of the embassy and the phase-out of bilateral development cooperation, Zimbabwe remained an important partner for Sweden. Sweden intended to maintain good diplomatic relations, with greater emphasis on trade, investment and sustainable growth, including cooperation in sustainable mining, climate and environmental issues, democracy and human rights. Sweden would also remain engaged through political dialogue, economic exchange, multilateral and EU development assistance, as well as continued support for Swedish companies operating in Zimbabwe through Team Sweden.

== Staff and tasks ==
=== Staff ===
The embassy employed staff from the Swedish Ministry for Foreign Affairs, the Swedish International Development Cooperation Agency (Sida), as well as locally employed staff. Together, the team (in 2022) consisted of approximately 20 people. The embassy's staff consisted of the ambassador and the ambassador's secretary/assistant, as well as personnel divided into three main sections:

- Political, Trade and Promotion Section: section head and first secretary, and a communications officer.
- Development Cooperation Section: first and second secretaries, programme officers, controllers, and a programme administrator, covering areas such as human rights, democracy, health, climate and environment, social sectors, media and democracy, and inclusive economic development.
- Administrative and Consular Affairs Section: section head, cashier, administrative and migration staff, an administrator responsible for protocol and property matters, two drivers, and a caretaker.

Overall, the staffing structure comprised diplomatic officers, development cooperation specialists, administrative and consular staff, communications personnel, and locally employed support staff.

=== Tasks ===
The embassy's mission was to promote relations between Sweden and Zimbabwe in a broad sense. This work included political dialogue with the Government of Zimbabwe, political parties and civil society; development cooperation; investment and trade promotion; cultural exchange; and representing Swedish government authorities in various matters relating to Zimbabwe. The embassy also represented Sweden in Malawi and Mauritius.

The embassy provided assistance to Swedish citizens in consular matters, for example in the event of a consular crisis. Swedish citizens, as well as foreign family members of Swedish citizens, who were residing in or planning to stay for an extended period in Zimbabwe, Malawi or Mauritius were able to register on the embassy's list of Swedes residing in each respective country. The list was intended solely for emergency preparedness purposes.

The embassy was divided into the following sections: the Political, Trade and Promotion Section; the Bilateral Development Cooperation Section for Zimbabwe, and the Administration, Migration and Consular Affairs Section.

== Buildings ==
=== Chancery ===
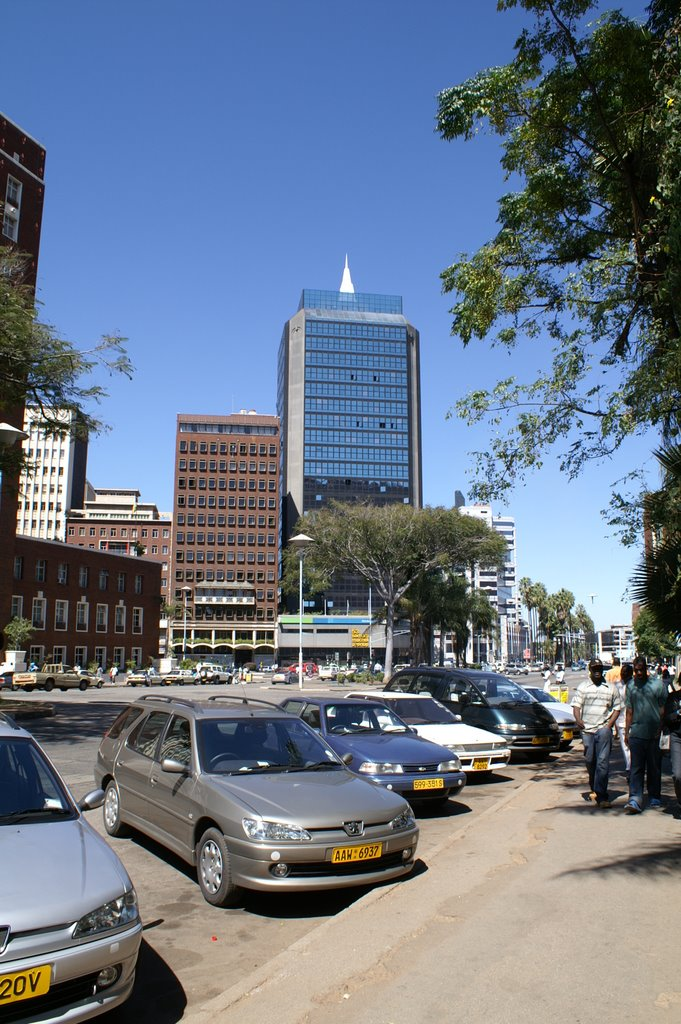
The chancery was initially, from 1980, located at 55 Samora Machel Avenue (the brown building)

From the embassy's opening in 1980 until at least 1987, the chancery was located at 55 Samora Machel Avenue in the inner-city suburb of The Avenues. Together with the Swedish International Development Cooperation Agency (Sida)'s aid office, it occupied the top two floors of an eleven-storey building owned by the South African company Old Mutual.

In the late 1990s, it was located in Pegasus House at 52 Samora Machel Avenue.

At some point before 2007, the chancery moved to 32 Aberdeen Road in the suburb of Avondale, where it remained until the embassy closed in 2026.

=== Residence and staff housing ===
Sweden's ambassador's residence was located at 5 Norman Close (17.78336°S 31.09955°E). Built in 1960, it was situated in the residential area of Rietfontein, approximately 9 km northeast from the city centre. The property occupied a 9,000 m² walled plot and included a representative single-storey villa with eight rooms and a kitchen, as well as staff accommodation, guest houses, carports, a swimming pool, and a tennis court.

Zimbabwe gained independence in 1980, when Sweden also established its embassy in Harare, then known as Salisbury. During this period, suitable housing for diplomats was in high demand, but the embassy and the predecessor of the National Property Board of Sweden succeeded in securing appropriate residences, including a suitable home for the Swedish ambassador. The dining room was extended in 1995, and the kitchen was modernised in 2002. The architect of the original 1960 building is unknown. The property was surrounded by walls and hedges, with landscaped gardens providing privacy and a representative setting.

Staff housing was available at the addresses 3 Bryden Road in Northwood, 42 Orange Grove Drive in Highlands, and 23 Woodholme Road in Emerald Hill.
