= List of ambassadors of Sweden to Zimbabwe =

Ambassador of Sweden to Zimbabwe
- Lesser coat of arms of the Kingdom of Sweden
- Incumbent; Per Lindgärde since August 2023
- Ministry for Foreign Affairs; Swedish Embassy, Harare
- Style: His or Her Excellency (formal); Mr. or Madam Ambassador (informal)
- Reports to: Minister for Foreign Affairs
- Residence: 5 Norman Close, Colne Valley
- Seat: Harare, Zimbabwe
- Appointer: Government of Sweden
- Term length: No fixed term
- Inaugural holder: Bo Heinebäck
- Formation: 1980
- Website: Swedish Embassy, Harare

The Ambassador of Sweden to Zimbabwe (known formally as the Ambassador of the Kingdom of Sweden to the Republic of Zimbabwe) is the official representative of the government of Sweden to the president of Zimbabwe and government of Zimbabwe. The Swedish ambassador in Harare is also accredited to Malawi and Mauritius.

== History ==
Between 1936 and 1965, Sweden had an honorary consul and clerk in Salisbury. The consulate, which was under the jurisdiction of the Consulate General in Nairobi, was established to serve Southern Rhodesia and Nyasaland. It was closed following Rhodesia's unilateral declaration of independence in 1964.

Sweden recognized Zimbabwe as a sovereign and independent state on 18 April 1980, in connection with its declaration of independence. On that occasion, Prime Minister Thorbjörn Fälldin sent a congratulatory telegram to Zimbabwe's new Prime Minister, Robert Mugabe, conveying the Swedish government's best wishes. He also expressed hopes for strong and lasting relations between Sweden and Zimbabwe.

A month earlier, it had been reported that Sweden planned to request accreditation for a chargé d'affaires in time for Zimbabwe's independence day celebrations, with the intention of opening an embassy in the country shortly thereafter. That same month, Bo Heinebäck took over operations at the liaison office in Salisbury. Sweden established diplomatic relations with the new state immediately upon its independence, having already nominated Heinebäck as ambassador.

Since the early 2000s, Sweden's ambassador to Zimbabwe has also been accredited to Malawi and Mauritius.

== List of representatives ==
| Name | Period | Title | Notes | Ref |
|---|---|---|---|---|
| Bo Heinebäck | 1980–1984 | Ambassador | | |
| Lars Norberg | 1984–1988 | Ambassador | | |
| Peter Osvald | 1988–1990 | Ambassador | | |
| Nils Daag | 1990–1993 | Ambassador | | |
| Per Taxell | 1993–1996 | Ambassador | | |
| Lennarth Hjelmåker | 1996–2001 | Ambassador | | |
| Kristina Svensson | 2001–2005 | Ambassador | Also accredited in Malawi and Mauritius (from 2002). | |
| Sten Rylander | 2006–2010 | Ambassador | Also accredited in Malawi and Mauritius. | |
| Anders Lidén | 2010–2012 | Ambassador | Also accredited in Malawi and Mauritius. | |
| Lars Ronnås | 2012–2016 | Ambassador | Also accredited in Malawi and Mauritius. | |
| Sofia Calltorp | September 2016 – 2019 | Ambassador | Also accredited in Malawi and Mauritius. | |
| Åsa Pehrson | 1 September 2019 – 2023 | Ambassador | Also accredited in Malawi and Mauritius. | |
| Per Lindgärde | August 2023 – present | Ambassador | Also accredited in Malawi and Mauritius. | |

== See also ==
- Embassy of Sweden, Harare
