= Cohort (educational group) =

Students who do a curriculum together

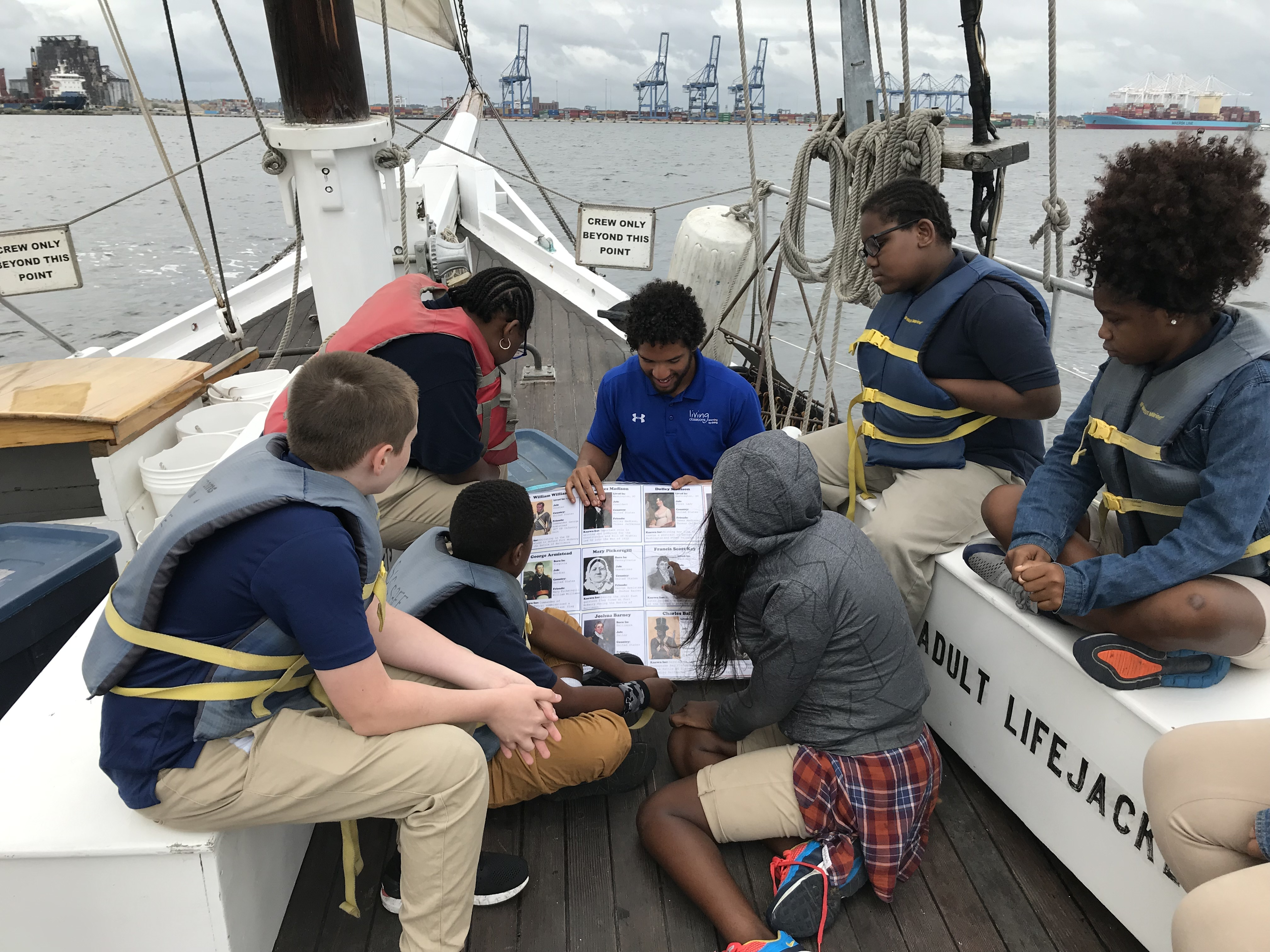
A student cohort aboard a ship on the Star-Spangled National Historic Trail learning about the War of 1812

A cohort is a group of students who work through a curriculum together to achieve the same academic degree together. Cohortians are the individual members of such a group. In a cohort, there is an expectation of richness to the learning process due to the multiple perspectives offered by the students.

== Cohort model ==
A cohort model features a delivery structure that is driven by the expectations, experiences, and beliefs of the cohort's participants. It is usually implemented based on an applicable theory such as the structuration framework. Cohort groups can be organized in such a way that groups of students take a number of similar programs each semester and this organization can change when the term ends so that students can interact with more students.

Cohort can be distinguished from groups of students through the following aspects:

- cohorts allow school administrators to enroll students en masse while groups only concern teacher management within the class;
- cohorts are bigger than groups; and,
- a cohort involves a set of students within a system-wide course.

Cohort-based learning (CBC) is a learning model that integrates content with the community. Since most of the interaction occurs in real-time, CBC falls under the category of synchronous learning. The model works similarly to conventional classroom learning, where a group of like-minded students learns the same content together to achieve similar outcomes.
