= Manama, Zimbabwe =

Coordinates: 21°33.75′S 29°0.5′E

Manama
- Rural Service Centre
- Interactive map of Manama
- Country: Zimbabwe
- Province: Matabeleland South
- District: Gwanda District
- Time zone: UTC+2 (Central Africa Time)

Location of Manama

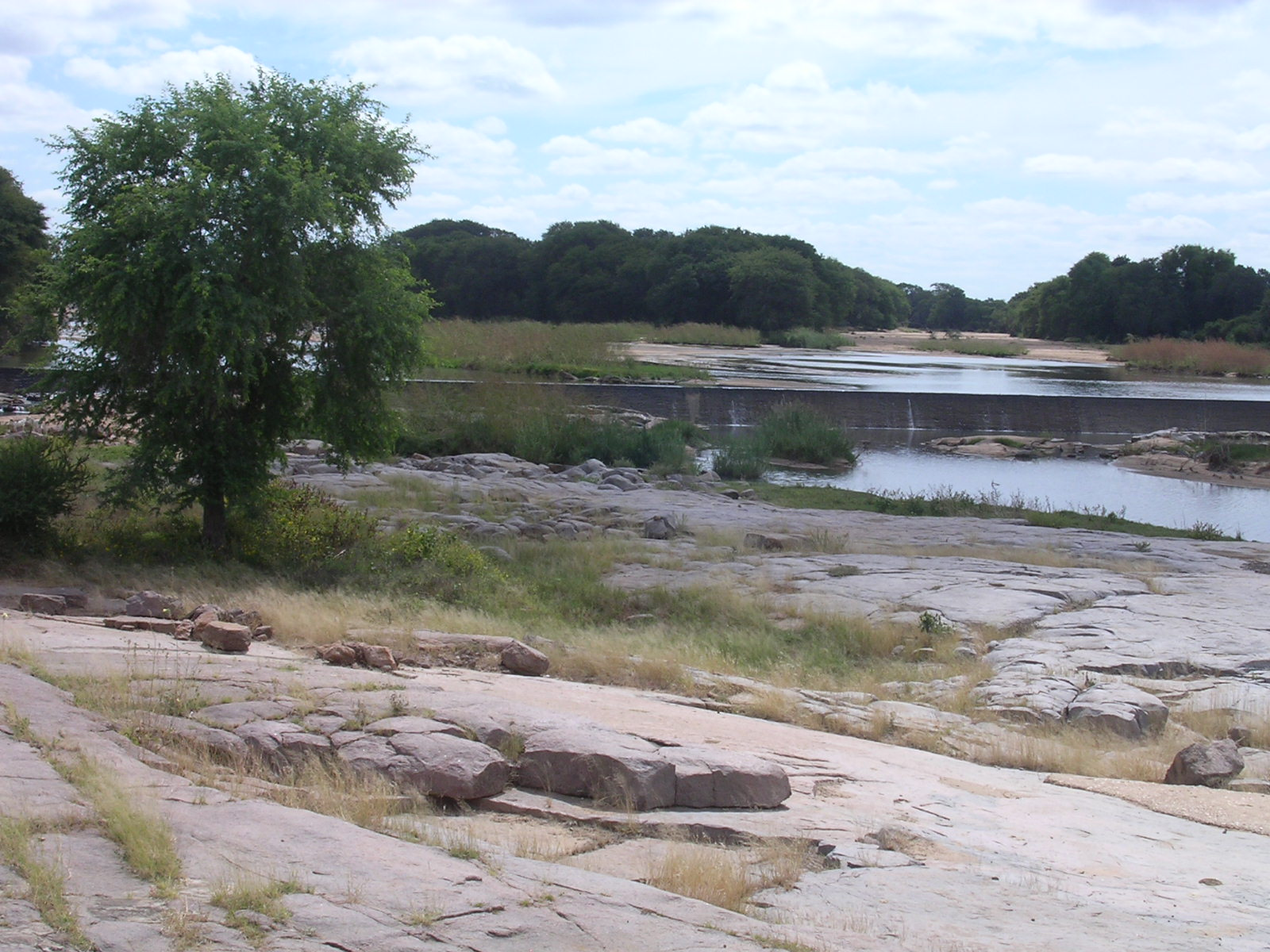
Thuli River at Manama.

Manama is a village in Gwanda District ward, in the province of Matabeleland South, Zimbabwe. It is located south of Gwanda on the road to Kafusi.

The village is a rural service centre with a Lutheran Mission that has a hospital and a high school, a small commercial centre and a bus rank. FM radio station Ntepe-Manama is based in the village.

The Thuli River runs through the town.
