= Kvarnholmen (Nacka) =

Peninsula and urban district in Nacka, Sweden

Coordinates: 59°18′59.66″N 18°8′22.82″E

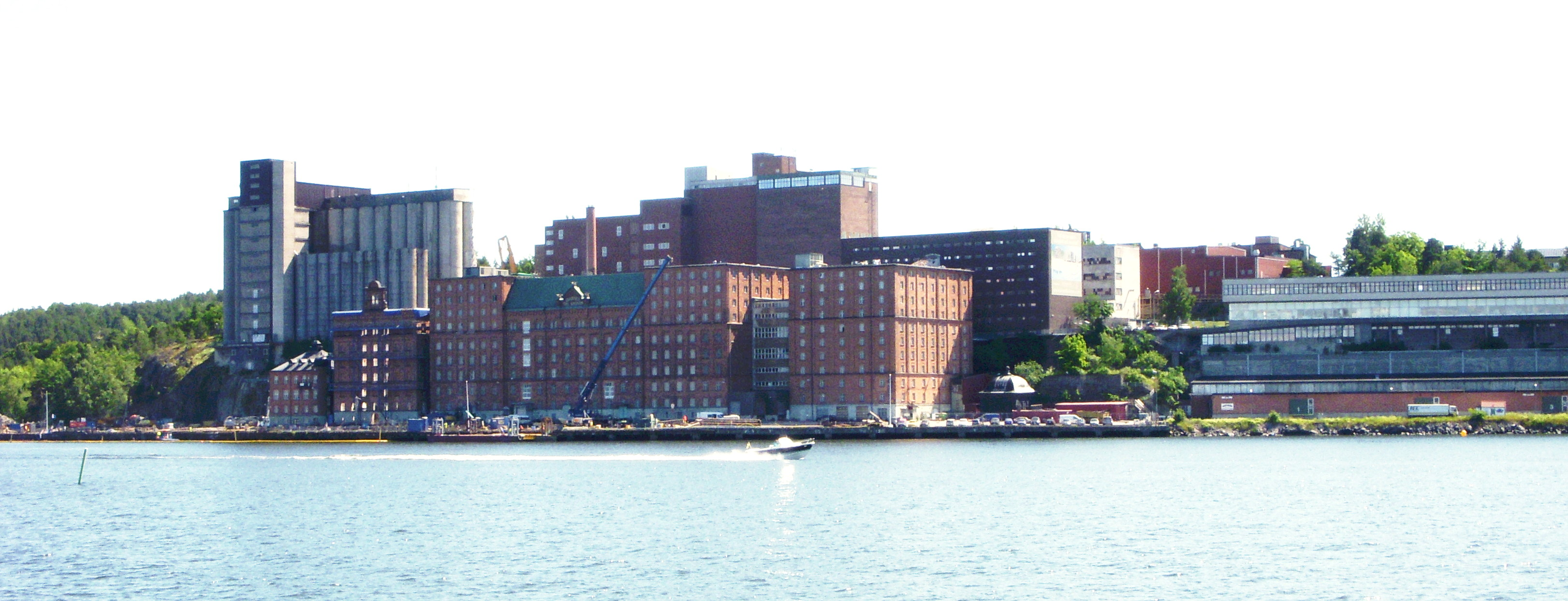
Eastern Kvarnholmen

Kvarnholmen is a peninsula on the western part of the Nacka Municipality, south-east of Stockholm, Sweden. It is surrounded by the Saltsjön to the north and by the Svindersvik bay to the south. It used to only be connected in the south-west, but a permanent bridge now connects it in the south-east to the rest of Nacka.

== History ==
The modern history of Kvarnholmen starts with the foundation of the mill Qvarnen Tre Kronor in 1897. 1922 the mill was bought by Kooperativa Förbundet, developing the peninsula into a mix of food industry sites and a residential area in the functionalist architectural style for the company's workers. The food production on the peninsula stopped in 1992.

Since 2007 Kvarnholmen has been developed into a new residential area by keeping some of the old industrial buildings and transforming them into residential buildings as well as covering the unused green areas with new residential buildnings. Today Kvarnholmen has about 2,655 inhabitants. By 2040, the number of inhabitants is expected to grow to over 5,000 people.
