= List of ambassadors of Sweden to Kenya =

Ambassador of Sweden to Kenya
- Lesser coat of arms of the Kingdom of Sweden
- Incumbent; Håkan Åkesson since 2025
- Ministry for Foreign Affairs; Swedish Embassy, Nairobi
- Style: His or Her Excellency (formal); Mr. or Madam Ambassador (informal)
- Reports to: Minister for Foreign Affairs
- Residence: Limuru Road, Rosslyn Estate
- Seat: Nairobi, Kenya
- Appointer: Government of Sweden
- Term length: No fixed term
- Inaugural holder: Otto Rathsman
- Formation: 1964
- Website: Swedish Embassy, Nairobi

The Ambassador of Sweden to Kenya (known formally as the Ambassador of the Kingdom of Sweden to the Republic of Kenya) is the official representative of the government of Sweden to the president of Kenya and government of Kenya. The ambassador is concurrently accredited to neighboring countries and to the United Nations Environment Programme (UNEP) and the United Nations Human Settlements Programme (UN-Habitat) in Nairobi.

== History ==
In April 1962, Otto Rathsman was appointed Consul General to a career consulate general, which, according to a parliamentary decision, was to be established in Nairobi. On the occasion of the proclamation of Kenya's independence on 12 December 1963, Sweden's Prime Minister Tage Erlander stated in a congratulatory telegram to Prime Minister Jomo Kenyatta that the Swedish government recognized Kenya as a sovereign and independent state, and expressed the Swedish government's desire to maintain friendly and cordial relations with Kenya. Sweden was represented at the independence celebrations in Kenya by Consul General Rathsman in Nairobi, in the capacity of Ambassadeur émission spéciale. During the council meeting on 31 January 1964, Consul General Rathsman was appointed ambassador to Nairobi, following Kenya's achievement of independence on 12 December the previous year.

Since 1964, Sweden's ambassador to Kenya has been concurrently accredited to neighboring countries: Burundi (1964–1966, 1973–present), Comoros (1998–present), Rwanda (1964–1966, 1973–2012), Seychelles (1978–1981, 1998–present), Tanzania (1964–1968), Uganda (1964–1998), and Zambia (1964–1967). The ambassador is also accredited to the United Nations Environment Programme (UNEP) and the United Nations Human Settlements Programme (UN-Habitat) in Nairobi.

== List of representatives ==
Name	Period	Title	Resident / Concurrent accreditation	Notes	Presented credentials	Ref
Otto Rathsman	1964–1966	Ambassador	Dual accreditation to Bujumbura, Dar es Salaam, Kampala, Kigali, and Lusaka			
Carl Gustaf Béve	1966–1968	Ambassador	Dual accreditation to Bujumbura (until 1967), Dar es Salaam, Kampala, and Lusaka (until 1967)			
Carl-George Crafoord	1968–1973	Ambassador	Dual accreditation to Kampala (from 1969)			
Lennart Rydfors	1973–1978	Ambassador	Dual accreditation to Bujumbura (from 1975), Kigali (from 1974), and Kampala			
Cecilia Nettelbrandt	1978–1983	Ambassador	Dual accreditation to Bujumbura, Kampala (from 1979), Kigali, and Victoria (1979–1981)			
Arne Fältheim	1983–1988	Ambassador	Dual accreditation to Bujumbura, Kampala, and Kigali, as well as UNEP and UN-Habitat (from 1987)			
Nils Gunnar Revelius	1988–1993	Ambassador	Dual accreditation to Bujumbura, Kampala, and Kigali (all three from 1989), as well as UNEP and UN-Habitat			
Lars-Göran Engfeldt	1993–1998	Ambassador	Dual accreditation to Bujumbura (from 1994), Kampala, and Kigali, as well as UNEP and UN-Habitat			
Inga Björk-Klevby	1998–2002	Ambassador	Dual accreditation to Bujumbura, Kigali, Moroni, and Victoria			
Bo Göransson	2003–2006	Ambassador	Dual accreditation to Bujumbura, Kigali, Moroni, and Victoria			
Anna Brandt	2006–2009	Ambassador	Dual accreditation to Bujumbura, Kigali, Moroni, and Victoria, as well as UNEP and UN-Habitat			
Ann Dismorr	September 2009 – 2012	Ambassador	Dual accreditation to Bujumbura, Kigali, Moroni, and Victoria, as well as UNEP and UN-Habitat			
Johan Borgstam	2012–2017	Ambassador	Dual accreditation to Moroni and Victoria, as well as UNEP and UN-Habitat			
Anna Jardfelt Melvin	1 September 2017 – 2020	Ambassador	Dual accreditation to Moroni and Victoria, as well as UNEP and UN-Habitat			
Caroline Vicini	1 September 2020 – 2025	Ambassador	Dual accreditation to Moroni and Victoria, as well as UNEP and UN-Habitat			
Håkan Åkesson	2025–present	Ambassador	Dual accreditation to Victoria, as well as UNEP and UN-Habitat		3 September 2025	

== See also ==
- Kenya–Sweden relations
