= Harald Pousette =

Swedish diplomat

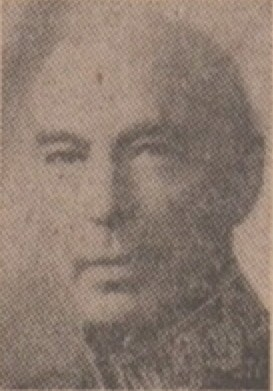
- Born: Sven Harald Pousette; 18 June 1886; Gävle, Sweden
- Died: 6 May 1975 (aged 88); Stockholm, Sweden
- Resting place: Lidingö Cemetery
- Education: Uppsala University
- Occupation: Diplomat
- Years active: 1909–1959
- Spouse: Cecilia Cedercrantz (m. 1920)
- Children: 3, including Tage Pousette

Sven Harald Pousette (18 June 1886 – 6 May 1975) was a Swedish diplomat.

== Early life ==
Pousette was born on 18 June 1886 in Gävle, Sweden, the son of Captain Fredrik Pousette and his wife Valborg (née Bodman). He passed the reserve officer exam in 1907 and graduated with an administrative degree (kansliexamen) in Uppsala in 1908.

== Career ==
Pousette became an attaché at the Ministry for Foreign Affairs the same year. Pousette served in Washington, D.C. in 1909, was legation secretary in Brussels and The Hague in 1911 and was secretary of the Minister for Foreign Affairs from 1919 to 1920.

He was first legation secretary in Tokyo in 1921, in Rome in 1924 and legation counsellor in 1928. Pousette was director at the Foreign Ministry in 1929 and legation counsellor in Berlin in 1934 and in London in 1938. He became minister plenipotentiary in 1941 and was chargé d'affaires ad interim in Tehran in 1941 (also accredited to Baghdad) and envoy there from 1945 to 1947 as well as in Reykjavík from 1947 to 1951.

Pousette was chairman of Alliance française from 1952 to 1959.

== Personal life ==
In 1920 he married Cecilia Cedercrantz (1896–1987), the daughter of county governor Conrad Cedercrantz and Elisabeth (née Sjöcrona). He was the father of the diplomat Tage Pousette (1921–2012).

Pousette resided in Villa Diorama at Hazeliusbacken 18 on Djurgården in Stockholm.

== Death ==
Pousette died on 6 May 1975 in Stockholm. He was buried on 27 August 1975 at Lidingö Cemetery in Lidingö.

== Awards and decorations ==
Pousette's awards:

=== Swedish ===
- King Gustaf V's Jubilee Commemorative Medal (1928)
- (Sweden) Commander 1st Class of the Order of the Polar Star
- (Sweden) King Gustaf V's Olympic Commemorative Medal (Konung Gustaf V:s olympiska minnesmedalj)

=== Foreign ===
- (Iceland) Grand Cross of the Order of the Falcon (6 June 1951)
- (Pahlavi dynasty) Grand Cross of the Iranian Order of Homayoun
- Grand Cross of the Order of Merit of the Republic of Hungary
- (Bulgaria) Grand Officer of the Order of Civil Merit
- Grand Officer of the Order of the Crown of Italy
- (Nazi Germany) 1st Class of the Order of the German Eagle
- (Denmark) Commander of the Order of the Dannebrog
- (Italy) Commander of the Order of Saints Maurice and Lazarus
- (Japan) 3rd Class of the Order of the Sacred Treasure
- (China) 3rd Class of the Chinese Order of the Golden Harvest
- (Pahlavi dynasty) 3rd Class of the Order of the Lion and the Sun
- (Belgium) Officer of the Order of Leopold
- (Belgium) Officer of the Order of the Crown
- (Netherlands) Officer of the Order of Orange-Nassau
- (France) Officer of the Legion of Honour
- (Nazi Germany) German Olympic Honorary Badge (Tyska olympiska hederstecknet)

Diplomatic posts
Preceded by Hugo von Heidenstam	Chargé d'affaires of Sweden to Iran and Iraq; 1941–1945	Succeeded by Himself (as Envoy)
Preceded by Himself (as Chargé d'affaires)	Envoy of Sweden to Iran and Iraq; 1945–1947	Succeeded by Harry Eriksson
Preceded by Otto Johansson	Emvoy of Sweden to Iceland; 1947–1951	Succeeded by Leif Öhrvall (as Chargé d'affaires)
