= List of ambassadors of Sweden to Iraq =

Ambassador of Sweden to Iraq
- Lesser coat of arms of the Kingdom of Sweden
- Incumbent; Jörgen Lindström; Special Envoy since December 2024
- Ministry for Foreign Affairs; Swedish Embassy, Baghdad
- Style: His or Her Excellency (formal); Mr. or Madam Ambassador (informal)
- Reports to: Minister for Foreign Affairs
- Seat: Stockholm, Sweden (Note: The storming of the Swedish embassy in Baghdad in the summer of 2023 led to significant damage to the Swedish chancery building and to the fact that the embassy had to be relocated to Stockholm.)
- Appointer: Government of Sweden
- Term length: No fixed term
- Inaugural holder: Eric Gyllenstierna
- Formation: 18 May 1934
- Website: Swedish Embassy, Baghdad

The Ambassador of Sweden to Iraq (known formally as the Ambassador of the Kingdom of Sweden to the Republic of Iraq) is the official representative of the government of Sweden to the president of Iraq and government of Iraq.

== History ==
From 1934 to 1936, the Swedish minister in Moscow, Soviet Union held a dual accreditation to Baghdad, and from 1936 the Swedish minister in Tehran held a dual accreditation to Baghdad.

In February 1960, the envoy was appointed ambassador there after an agreement with the Iraqi government regarding diplomatic representation. The ambassador remained accredited from Tehran, but a legation office was opened in Baghdad, headed by a first secretary from March of the same year. In May 1964, Bengt Odhner was appointed as Sweden's first resident ambassador in Baghdad.

The ambassador has been based in Stockholm since the storming of the Swedish embassy in Baghdad in the summer of 2023.

== List of representatives ==
Name	Period	Resident/Non resident	Title	Notes	Presented credentials	Ref
Kingdom of Iraq (1932–1958)
Eric Gyllenstierna	18 May 1934 – 1936	Non-resident	Envoy	Resident in Moscow.		
Hugo von Heidenstam	1936–1942	Non-resident	Envoy	Resident in Tehran.		
Harald Pousette	1941–1945	Non-resident	Chargé d'affaires ad interim	Resident in Tehran.		
Gunnar Jarring	1945–1945	Non-resident	Chargé d'affaires ad interim	Resident in Tehran.		
Harald Pousette	1945–1947	Non-resident	Envoy	Resident in Tehran.		
Harry Eriksson	1948–1951	Non-resident	Envoy	Resident in Tehran.		
Gunnar Jarring	1951–1952	Non-resident	Envoy	Resident in Tehran.		
Ragnvald Bagge	1953–1958	Non-resident	Envoy	Resident in Tehran.		
First Republic of Iraq (1958–1968)
Ragnvald Bagge	1958–1959	Non-resident	Envoy	Resident in Tehran.		
Dick Hichens-Bergström	1959–1960	Non-resident	Envoy	Resident in Tehran.		
Dick Hichens-Bergström	1960–1963	Non-resident	Ambassador	Resident in Tehran.		
Carl Johan Rappe	1961–1962	Resident	Chargé d'affaires ad interim			
Bengt Odhner	1964–1968	Resident	Ambassador	Also accredited to Kuwait City (from 1965).		
Iraqi Republic (1968–1992)
Bengt Odhner	1968–1969	Resident	Ambassador	Also accredited to Kuwait City.		
Gunnar Gerring	1969–1973	Resident	Ambassador	Also accredited to Kuwait City.		
Otto Rathsman	1973–1975	Resident	Ambassador			
Fredrik Bergenstråhle	1975–1979	Resident	Ambassador			
Lars-Olof Brilioth	1979–1982	Resident	Ambassador			
Arne Thorén	1983–1988	Resident	Ambassador			
Henrik Amnéus	1988–1992	Resident	Ambassador	Left Iraq in mid-January 1991.		
Torkel Stiernlöf	July 1990 – August 1990	Resident	Chargé d'affaires			
Republic of Iraq (1992–2003)
Henrik Amnéus	1992–1993	Non-resident	Ambassador	Resident in Stockholm.		
–	1993–2004	Non-resident	–	Vacant		
Republic of Iraq (2004–present)
Karin Roxman	2004–2006	Non-resident	Ambassador	Resident in Amman.		
Niclas Trouvé	2006–2010	Non-resident	Ambassador	Resident in Amman. (Note: After the new embassy was opened in 2009, ambassador Trouvé was resident in Baghdad.)		
Carl Magnus Nesser	2010–2012	Resident	Ambassador			
Jörgen Lindström	2012–2015	Resident	Ambassador			
Annika Molin Hellgren	2015–2017	Resident	Ambassador			
Pontus Melander	1 September 2017 – 2019	Resident	Ambassador			
Lars Ronnås	1 September 2019 – 2021	Resident	Ambassador			
Jonas Lovén	2021–2022	Resident	Ambassador		17 August 2021	
Jessica Svärdström	August 2022 – 2024	Non-resident	Ambassador	Resident in Stockholm (from 2023).		
Jörgen Lindström	December 2024 – present	Non-resident	Special Envoy	Resident in Stockholm.		

== See also ==
- Iraq–Sweden relations
- Embassy of Sweden, Baghdad
