= Bengt Odhner =

Swedish diplomat

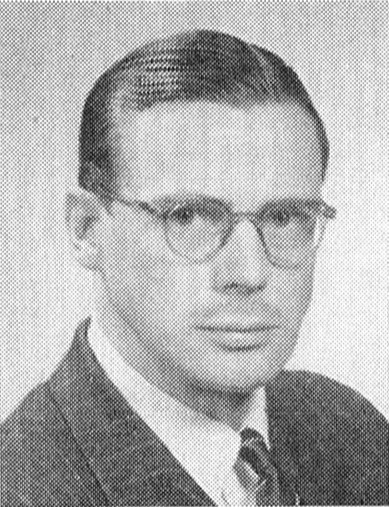
- Born: Bengt Arne Odhner; 10 August 1918; Stockholm, Sweden
- Died: 20 November 1990 (aged 72); Sundbyberg, Sweden
- Education: University of Genoa
- Occupation: Diplomat
- Years active: 1945–1984
- Father: Nils Hjalmar Odhner

Bengt Arne Odhner (10 August 1918 – 20 November 1990) was a Swedish diplomat whose career spanned from 1945 to 1984. After early postings in Tehran and Baghdad, he held key roles at the Ministry for Foreign Affairs, including serving as secretary to the Foreign Minister and participating in international trade negotiations. He served at embassies in Washington, D.C., and Warsaw, and led the Ministry's Division for International Assistance Affairs. Notably, he headed trade and industry delegations to East Africa and other special missions to China, North Yemen, Algeria, and Indonesia. Odhner was appointed ambassador to Iraq (1964–1969), with concurrent accreditation to Kuwait, and chaired the Swedish–Iranian Joint Commission in 1967. He later served as ambassador to Pakistan (1969–1973), Iran and Afghanistan (1973–1978), and Tunisia (1983–1984). Following his diplomatic career, he chaired the Swedish Research Institute in Istanbul from 1985 to 1987. Throughout his life, Odhner maintained a deep passion for the Orient and Mediterranean cultures, especially Turkey.

== Early life ==
Odhner was born on 10 August 1918 in Adolf Fredrik Parish in Stockholm, Sweden, the son of Professor Nils Hjalmar Odhner and his wife Signhild (née Hagström). He graduated from secondary school in Stockholm in 1937 and served at the Swedish Consulate General in Genoa in 1938, becoming a clerk there in 1941. In 1943 he was posted to the Swedish Consulate in Milan, and in 1944 earned a Doctor of Laws degree from the University of Genoa in Italy.

== Career ==
Odhner began his diplomatic career in 1945 as an attaché at the Ministry for Foreign Affairs in Stockholm. From 1947 to 1950 he served in Tehran and Baghdad, followed by a posting as second secretary at the Foreign Ministry from 1950 to 1955. During this time, he also acted as secretary to the Minister for Foreign Affairs Östen Undén (1950–1952) and as secretary and delegate in trade negotiations with a number of countries (1953–1956). In 1955 he was appointed first secretary at the Foreign Ministry and later served at the Swedish embassy in Washington, D.C. (1955–1959). He was counsellor at the embassy in Warsaw from 1959 to 1961, and from 1962 to 1964 headed the Foreign Ministry's Division for International Assistance Affairs, also serving as deputy board member of the Swedish Agency for International Assistance (Nämnden för internationellt bistånd).

In 1963, Odhner led the Swedish General Export Association's (Sveriges Allmänna Exportförening) trade and industry delegation to East Africa. Over the course of his career, Odhner also headed special delegations to countries including China, North Yemen, Algeria, and Indonesia. He was appointed ambassador to Iraq (Baghdad) from 1964 to 1969, with concurrent accreditation to Kuwait (1965–1969), and in 1967 chaired the Swedish–Iranian Joint Commission (Svensk-iranska blandade kommissionen). He subsequently served as ambassador to Pakistan (Rawalpindi/Islamabad, 1969–1973) and to Iran and Afghanistan (Tehran and Kabul, 1973–1978). From 1978 to 1982 he was responsible for trade policy negotiations at the Foreign Ministry, and from 1983 to 1984 served as ambassadör to Tunisia. Odhner was chairman of the board of the Swedish Research Institute in Istanbul from 1985 to 1987.

== Personal life ==
Odhner was unmarried.

Odhner nurtured a lifelong fascination with the Orient and the Mediterranean, shaped by years in Italy and a deep affection for Turkey, whose rich culture he regarded as unparalleled.

== Death ==
Odhner died on 20 November 1990 in Sundbyberg Parish in Stockholm County, Sweden. The funeral service was held on 18 December 1990 at Danderyd Church in Danderyd Municipality. He was interred on 26 April 1991 at Danderyd Cemetery.

== Awards and decorations ==
- (Sweden) Knight of the Order of the Polar Star
- (Iran) Commander of the Order of Homayoun
- (Tunisia) Commander of the Order of the Republic
- (Netherlands) Knight of the Order of Orange-Nassau
- (Hungary) Knight of the Hungarian Order of Merit
- (Sweden) Swedish Red Cross Silver Medal

Diplomatic posts
Preceded by Dick Hichens-Bergström	Ambassador of Sweden to Iraq; 1964–1969	Succeeded by Gunnar Gerring
Preceded by None	Ambassador of Sweden to Kuwait; 1965–1969	Succeeded by Gunnar Gerring
Preceded by Lennart Finnmark	Ambassador of Sweden to Pakistan; 1969–1973	Succeeded by Rune Nyström
Preceded by Gustaf Bonde	Ambassador of Sweden to Iran; 1973–1978	Succeeded by Kaj Sundberg
Preceded by Gustaf Bonde	Ambassador of Sweden to Afghanistan; 1973–1978	Succeeded by Kaj Sundberg
Preceded by Carl-Henric Nauckhoff	Ambassador of Sweden to Tunisia; 1983–1984	Succeeded by Anders Sandström
