= Gunnar Jarring =

Swedish diplomat and Turkologist (1907–2002)

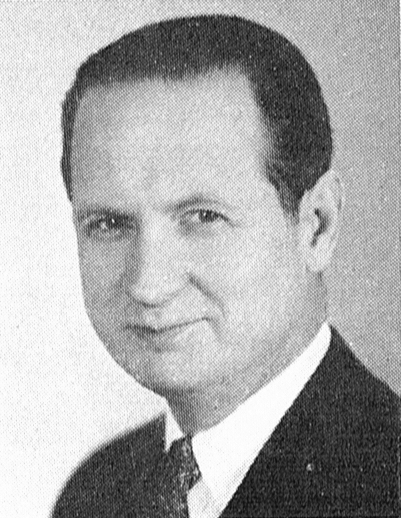

Ambassador of Sweden to the Soviet Union
- In office 1964–1973
- Preceded by: Rolf Sohlman
- Succeeded by: Brynolf Eng

Ambassador of Sweden to Mongolia
- In office 1965–1973
- Preceded by: None
- Succeeded by: Brynolf Eng

Ambassador of Sweden to the United States
- In office 1958–1964
- Preceded by: Erik Boheman
- Succeeded by: Hubert de Bèsche

Permanent Representative to the United Nations
- In office 1956–1958
- Preceded by: Oscar Thorsing
- Succeeded by: Agda Rössel

Envoy of Sweden to Iran
- In office 1951–1952
- Preceded by: Harry Eriksson
- Succeeded by: Ragnvald Bagge

Envoy of Sweden to Iraq
- In office 1951–1952
- Preceded by: Harry Eriksson
- Succeeded by: Ragnvald Bagge

Envoy of Sweden to Pakistan
- In office 1951–1952
- Preceded by: Harry Eriksson
- Succeeded by: Ragnvald Bagge

Envoy of Sweden to Ceylon
- In office 1950–1951
- Preceded by: None
- Succeeded by: Per Wijkman

Envoy of Sweden to India
- In office 1948–1951
- Preceded by: None
- Succeeded by: Per Wijkman

Personal details
- Born: Gunnar Valfrid Jarring; 12 October 1907 Brunnby, Sweden
- Died: 29 May 2002 (aged 94) Stockholm, Sweden
- Spouse: Agnes Charlier (m. 1932; died 1999)
- Children: 1
- Relatives: Carl Charlier (father-in-law)
- Education: Lund University
- Occupation: Diplomat, turkologist

Gunnar Valfrid Jarring (12 October 1907 – 29 May 2002) was a Swedish diplomat and Turkologist.

== Early life ==
Jarring was born on 12 October 1907 in Brunnby, Malmöhus County, Sweden, the son of Gottfrid Jönsson, a farmer, and his wife Betty (née Svensson). He had four siblings. Jarring earned a Bachelor of Arts degree from Lund University in 1928, a Licentiate Degree in 1931, and a Doctor of Philosophy degree in 1933 with his dissertation Studien zu einer osttürkischen Lautlehre ("Studies in Eastern Turkic Phonology"). The same year he was appointed docent in Turkish linguistics at Lund University. Jarring also served as curator of Helsingborgs-Landskrona Student Nation at Lund University in 1933. He taught Turkic languages at the university for the rest of the 1930s. Jarring was also a board member of the Svenska orientsällskapet ("Swedish Oriental Society") from 1936 to 1940 and of the Centralbyrån i Lund för populära vetenskapliga föreläsningar ("The Central Office in Lund for Popular Scientific Lectures") at Lund University from 1939 to 1941. He conducted study trips to, among others, Chinese Turkestan 1929–1930, to Moscow and Leningrad in 1934, to the Northwest India and Afghanistan 1935–1936, and to the Near East in 1940.

== Diplomatic career ==
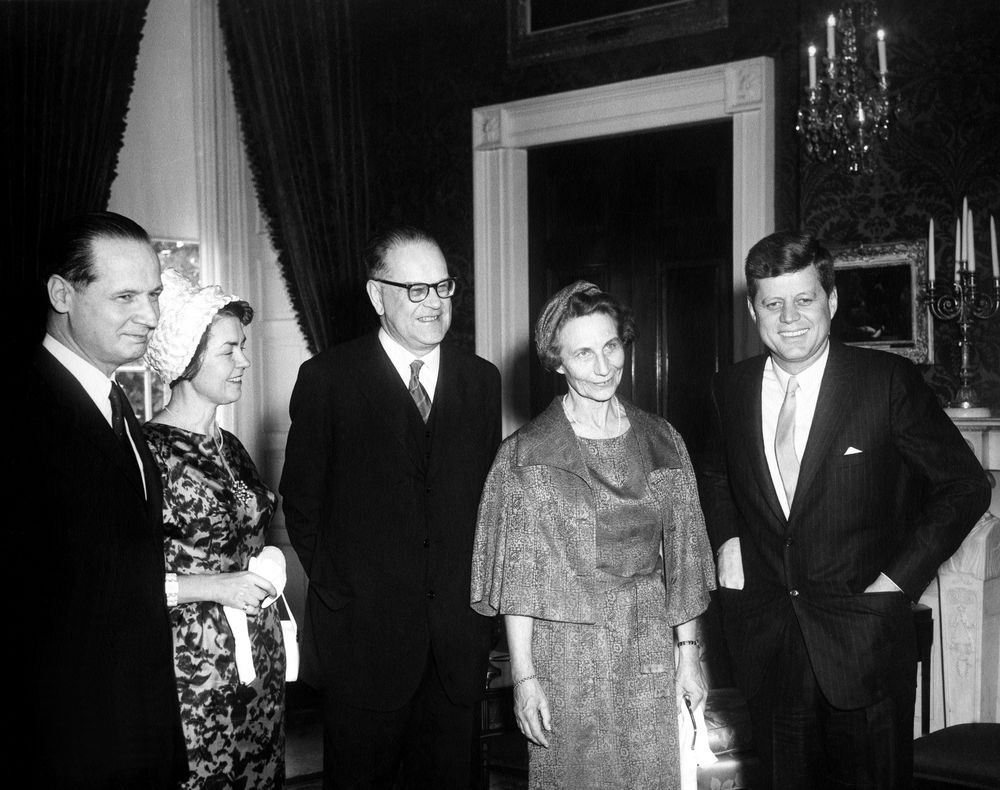
Gunnar Jarring (far left) with his wife, Agnes Charlier, Prime Minister of Sweden Tage Erlander and wife Aina Erlander and President John F. Kennedy, 1961.

Jarring entered the Swedish diplomatic service and worked for the Swedish foreign service as attaché at their embassy in Ankara in 1940. He was head of Department B at the Swedish legation in Tehran in 1941 and chargé d'affaires ad interim in Tehran and Baghdad in 1945. Jarring served as acting first legation secretary in 1945 and acting legation counselor and chargé d'affaires ad interim in Addis Abeba in 1946. Jarring was then Swedish envoy to India in 1948 and to Ceylon in 1950 as well as to Iran, Iraq and Pakistan in 1951. He served as director (utrikesråd) and head of the Political Department at the Ministry for Foreign Affairs in Stockholm from 1952 to 1956 and as an expert in the United Nations General Assembly in 1955.

After several other diplomatic missions, he was Sweden's Permanent Representative to the United Nations from 1956 to 1958, and sat in the Security Council for the last two of those years. He was ambassador to the United States from 1958 to 1964, and to the Soviet Union from 1964 to 1973, as well as Mongolia from 1965 to 1973. In that capacity he signed on behalf of his country on the Outer Space Treaty in January 1967.

After the 1967 Six-Day War and the adoption of UN Security Council Resolution 242, Jarring was appointed by the UN Secretary-General U Thant as a Special Representative of the Secretary-General for the Middle East peace process, the so-called Jarring Mission, during which he worked with the Four Powers who included United States UN Permanent Representative Ambassador Charles W. Yost. Jarring's methods of negotiation were used unsuccessfully until the 1973 Yom Kippur War. The mission officially lasted until 1991. The role of mediator in the Middle East conflict made Jarring decide not to give any interviews or comments, giving him the famous nickname "The Clam", sometimes even "The Super Clam".

Gunnar Jarring continued to publish studies on Eastern Turkic languages throughout his diplomatic career and after retirement. He is one of the few people to ever be mentioned by name in a United Nations Security Council Resolution, appearing in Resolution 331. His mention has also been made in the UN Security Councils's Resolution 123 dated 21 February 1957 on the issue of Jammu & Kashmir.

== Personal life ==
In 1932, he married Agnes Charlier (1909–1999), the daughter of professor Carl Charlier and Siri Dorotea (née Leissner). He was the father of Eva (born 1949).

== List of publications ==
=== Selected books ===
- Jarring, Gunnar (1981). Memoarer 1939-1952 [Memoirs 1939-1952] (in Swedish). Stockholm: Bonnier. ISBN 91-0-045350-1. SELIBR 7146495.
- Jarring, Gunnar (1989). Utan glasnost och perestrojka: memoarer 1964-1973 [Without glasnost and perestroika: memoirs 1964-1973] (in Swedish). Stockholm: Bonnier. ISBN 91-0-047756-7. SELIBR 7147815.
- Jarring, Gunnar (1979). Åter till Kashgar: memoarer i nuet [Return to Kashgar: memoirs in the present] (in Swedish). Stockholm: Bonnier. ISBN 91-0-044123-6. SELIBR 7146060.
- Jarring, Gunnar (1939). On the distribution of Turk tribes in Afghanistan: An attempt at a preliminary classification. Lunds universitets årsskrift. Första avdelningen, Teologi, juridik och humanistiska ämnen, 99-0507131-8; 35:4. Lund: Gleerup. SELIBR 1378130.
- Jarring, Gunnar (1938). Uzbek texts from Afghan Turkestan: with glossary. Lunds universitets årsskrift. Första avdelningen, Teologi, juridik och humanistiska ämnen, 99-0507131-8; 34:2. Lund: Gleerup. SELIBR 1378125.

=== Selected articles ===
- Gunnar Jarring. Obituary: Nikolaj Aleksandrovic Baskakov. Turkic Languages 1, 1997.
- Gunnar Jarring. The toponym Takla-makan. Turkic Languages 1, 1997.

== Awards and decorations ==
=== Swedish ===
- (Sweden) Commander Grand Cross of the Order of the Polar Star (6 June 1972)
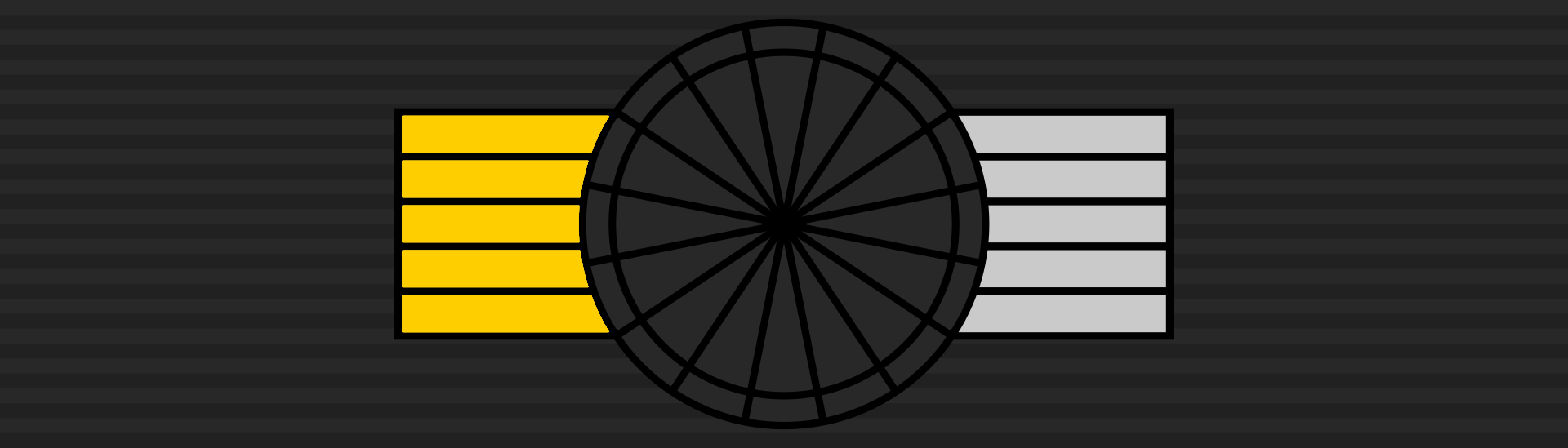
- (Sweden) Commander 1st Class of the Order of the Polar Star (28 November 1959)
- (Sweden) Commander of the Order of the Polar Star (5 June 1954)
- (Sweden) Knight of the Order of the Polar Star (1948)

=== Foreign ===
- (Ethiopian Empire) Grand Cross of the Order of Menelik II
- Grand Cross 2nd Class of the Order of Merit of the Federal Republic of Germany
- (Denmark) Commander 1st Class of the Order of the Dannebrog
- (Iceland) Grand Knight's Cross with Star of the Order of the Falcon (22 April 1954)
- (Norway) Commander with Star of the Order of St. Olav (1 July 1953)
- (Bulgaria) Commander of the Order of Civil Merit
- (Iran) Commander of the Order of Homayoun
- (Nazi Germany) 2nd Class of the Order of the German Eagle
- Officer of the Order of Merit of the Republic of Hungary
- (Finland) 4th Class of the Order of the Cross of Liberty with swords

== Honours ==
- Member of the Royal Swedish Academy of Sciences (1937)
- Member of the Royal Society of the Humanities at Lund (Kungliga Humanistiska Vetenskapssamfundet i Lund) (1965)
- Member of the Royal Swedish Academy of Letters, History and Antiquities (1968)
- Member of the Royal Swedish Academy of War Sciences (1970)
- Member of the Royal Physiographic Society in Lund (1972)
- Member of the Royal Society for Publication of Manuscripts on Scandinavian History (1974)
- Member of the Turkish Language Association (1957, honorary member 1978)
- Honorary member of the Royal Asiatic Society of Great Britain and Ireland (1970)
- Member of the Finnish Academy of Science and Letters (1981)
- Corresponding member of the Finno-Ugrian Society (1976)
- Corresponding member of the Bavarian Academy of Sciences and Humanities (1981)
- Honorary member of the American Oriental Society (1983)
- Honorary member of the Societas Uralo-Altaica (1985)
- Title of Professor (Professors namn) (1986)

Diplomatic posts
Preceded by None	Envoy of Sweden to India; 1948–1951	Succeeded by Per Wijkman
Preceded by None	Envoy of Sweden to Ceylon; 1950–1951	Succeeded by Per Wijkman
Preceded by Harry Eriksson	Envoy of Sweden to Iran; 1951–1952	Succeeded by Ragnvald Bagge
Preceded by Harry Eriksson	Envoy of Sweden to Iraq; 1951–1952	Succeeded by Ragnvald Bagge
Preceded by Harry Eriksson	Envoy of Sweden to Pakistan; 1951–1952	Succeeded by Ragnvald Bagge
Preceded by Oscar Thorsing	Permanent Representative to the United Nations; 1956–1958	Succeeded by Agda Rössel
Preceded by Erik Boheman	Ambassador of Sweden to the United States; 1958–1964	Succeeded by Hubert de Bèsche
Preceded by Rolf Sohlman	Ambassador of Sweden to the Soviet Union; 1964–1973	Succeeded by Brynolf Eng
Preceded by None	Ambassador of Sweden to Mongolia; 1965–1973	Succeeded by Brynolf Eng
Preceded by Position established	UN Sec. Gen. Special Representative to the Middle East; Nov. 23, 1967–March 21, 1991	Succeeded by Edouard Brunner
