= Hugo von Heidenstam =

Swedish diplomat and engineer

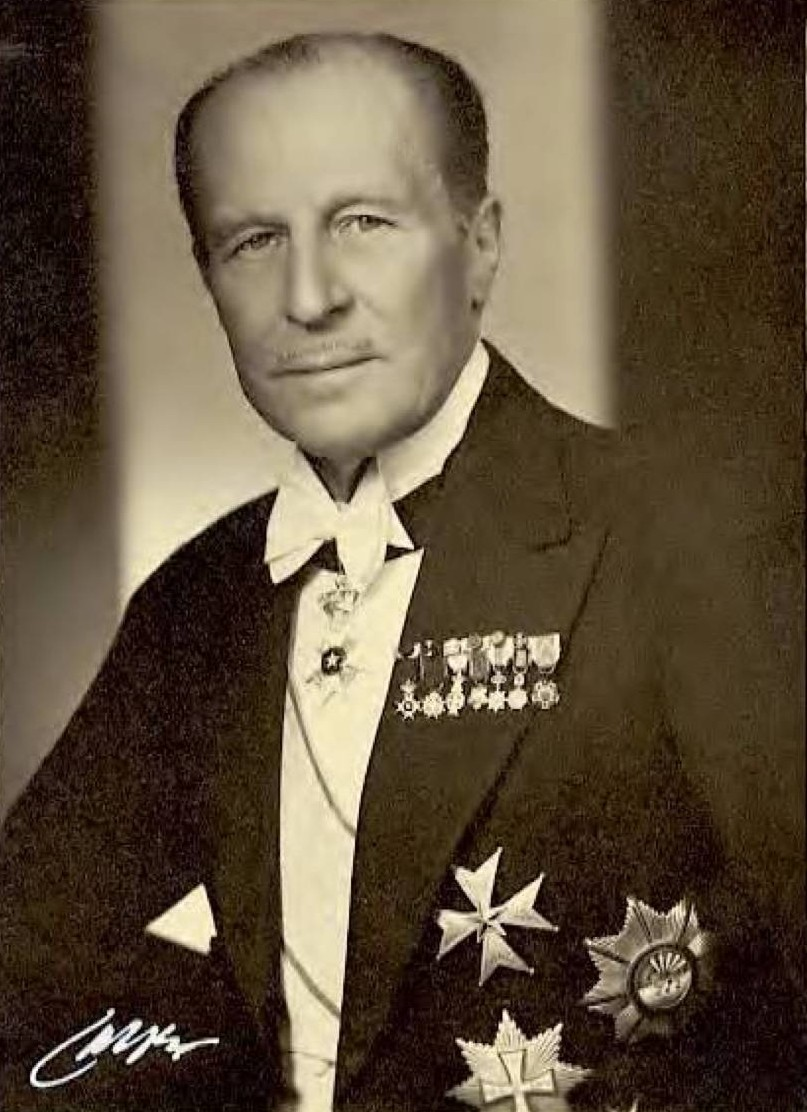
- Born: August Werner Hugo von Heidenstam; 29 April 1884; Karlskrona, Sweden
- Died: 27 July 1966 (aged 82); Stockholm, Sweden
- Education: KTH Royal Institute of Technology
- Occupations: Diplomat, engineer
- Years active: 1905–1959
- Spouse: Eva Margareta Gyllenkrok (m. 1917)
- Children: 4

August Werner Hugo von Heidenstam (29 April 1884 – 27 July 1966) was a Swedish diplomat and engineer. In 1910 von Heidenstam was appointed chief engineer of the Shanghai Commission for Port and River and worked there until 1926. Meanwhile, he was a member of several Chinese flood control commissions, and also worked as a consulting engineer. He returned to Stockholm in 1930 and was a partner of the Swedish Hydraulic Engineering Company (AB Vattenbyggnadsbyrån) from 1930 to 1936 and director of Svenska entreprenad AB from 1933 to 1936. During the period 1936-1942 he was the Swedish envoy in Tehran and Baghdad. He has in several publications dealt with Chinese engineering issues.

== Early life ==
von Heidenstam was born on 29 April 1884 in Karlskrona, Sweden, the son of Major Adolf von Heidenstam and his wife countess Hedda (née Cronstedt). He passed the mogenhetsexamen in 1901 and enrolled at the Royal Institute of Technology the same year. He graduated from its School of Civil Engineering (roads and hydraulic engineering) in April 1905. In August 1905, he completed his reserve officer examination and was commissioned as a underlöjtnant in the reserve of the Swedish Fortification Corps on 15 December 1905.

== Career ==
von Heidenstam worked as an engineer at the Swedish Hydraulic Engineering Company (AB Vattenbyggnadsbyrån) in Stockholm from 1905 to 1908 and was an engineer in the United States from 1908 to 1909 and in Shanghai, China from 1909 to 1910. He was chief engineer at the China International Commission for the Shanghai Port and River from 1910 to 1926.

It was back in 1907, when the Swedish Hydraulic Engineering Company formed in association with interested outsiders the Swedish Asiatic Consulting Engineering Company in order to make advances in the Far East. The pioneers were P. G. Hornell, Carl Schmidt and Hugo von Heidenstam. It turned out, however, that independent consulting engineers was unable to assert itself in competition with the financially strong construction companies that dominated the state and municipal construction activity in China and Japan, but von Heidenstam's expert entries in China's then current water issues resulted in his appointment as chief engineer at the international flood control department in Shanghai. Several Swedish engineers gathered around him as assistants in the implementation of major engineering works in the inlet to Shanghai. One of von Heidenstam's endeavors was dredging the river to make it navigable for large ships. von Heidenstam was a member of the Chinese government's committee on regulation of the Yangtze River and of the Zhili Province rivers and more from 1917 to 1928.

During the years 1918-1922 the Swedish Hydraulic Engineering Company conducted, in cooperation with von Heidenstam, extensive communications technical studies on the expansion of Shanghai's port and its importance for world trade. The result was the establishment of an international committee for the issue's further treatment. The chairman of the committee was von Heidenstam, and among its members were P. G. Hörnell and F. Palmer, the latter was the head of the engineering firm Rendel, Palmer & Tritton in London. The connection between these three men led in 1925 to an agreement on future cooperation between the Swedish Hydraulic Engineering Company and Palmer with von Heidenstam as common representative in London.

The year after he became head of the Swedish Hydraulic Engineering Company in London which he was until 1930. von Heidenstam was then co-owner of the Swedish Hydraulic Engineering Company in Stockholm and consulting engineer there from 1930 to 1936. von Heidenstam was Sweden's representative in the International Oder Commission from 1930 to 1937 and in the League of Nations Advisory Commission for Communications from 1930 to 1931 and the same for the control of the opium trade from 1934 to 1936. von Heidenstam became a lieutenant in the Road and Waterway Construction Service Corps in 1911 and was later promoted to captain in 1918, to major in 1928 and to lieutenant colonel in 1936. He was the Swedish envoy in Tehran, Iran as well as in Baghdad, Iraq from 1936 to 1942.

== Other work ==
von Heidenstam was chairman of the Swedish Association of Graduate Engineers' (Svenska Teknologföreningen) Department of Civil Engineering from 1933 to 1935, member of the Institution of Civil Engineers in London and the American Society of Civil Engineers as well as board member of the Institute of Swedish Foreign Service (Institutet för Svensk Utlandstjänst) from 1934 to 1936. He was the Swedish representative at the Permanent International Association of Navigation Congresses in Brussels from 1947 to 1957 (honorary member in 1958).

von Heidenstam was chairman of the Association for Inland Waterways (Föreningen för inre vattenvägar) in Stockholm from 1949 to 1959 (honorary member in 1959) and chairman of the board of AB Vägförbättringar in 1942. He was chairman of the Swedish-Iranian Association (Svensk-iranska föreningen) in 1949 and the Swedish-English Association (Svensk-engelska föreningen) in Stockholm from 1955 to 1957 (vice chairman from 1945 to 1955, honorary member in 1957). von Heidenstam was also vice chairman of the Swedes Worldwide Association (Utlandssvenskarnas förening) in Stockholm and chairman of its working committee in 1944.

== Personal life ==
On 31 May 1917 he married the Baroness Eva Margareta Gyllenkrok (1892–1982), the daughter of Captain (N), Baron Axel Thure Christian Gyllenkrok and Elin Emma Ulrika Frick. They had four children: Axel Gerhard Hugo (born 1918), Hedda Margareta (born 1921), Eva Jeanette (1923–2003), and Carl Werner (born 1928).

== Death ==
von Heidenstam died on 27 July 1966 and was buried at Åkers Cemetery in Åkers styckebruk.

== Awards and decorations ==
=== Swedish ===
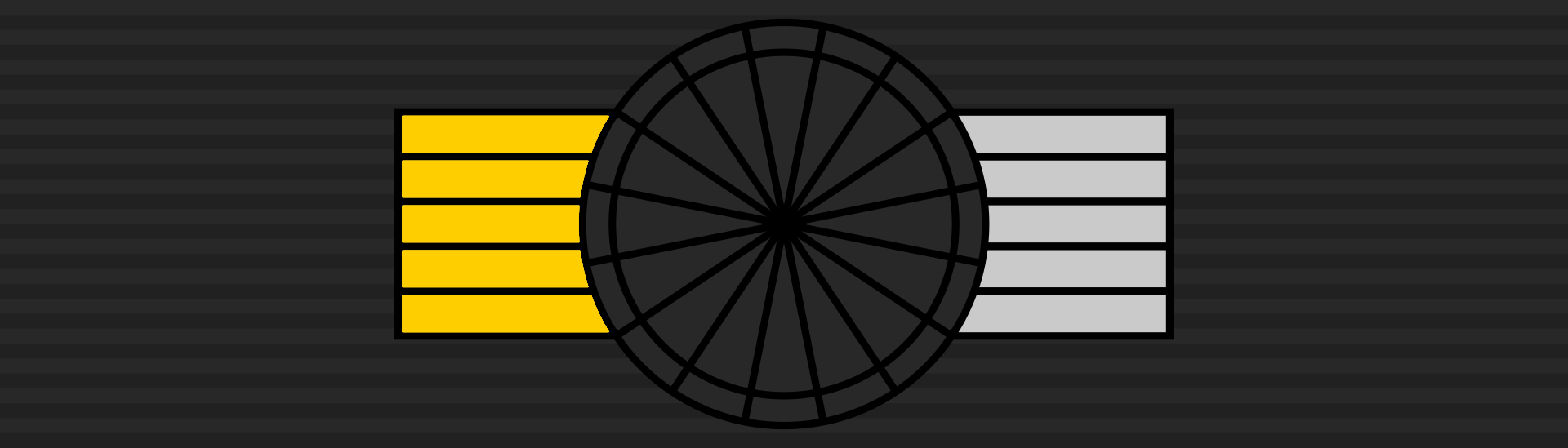
- (Sweden) Commander 1st Class of the Order of the Polar Star (15 November 1938)
- (Sweden) Knight of the Order of the Polar Star (25 November 1922)
- Knight of the Order of St John in Sweden

=== Foreign ===
- (Denmark) Grand Cross of the Order of the Dannebrog (23 August 1938)
- (Pahlavi dynasty) Grand Cross of the Order of Homayoun
- (Nazi Germany) Order of the German Eagle with Star
- (Kingdom of Iraq) 1st Class of the Order of the Two Rivers
- (Republic of China (1912–1949)) 3rd Class of the Order of the Precious Brilliant Golden Grain

== Bibliography ==
- Hugo von, Heidenstam; Richert, Johan; Hörnell, P G (1919). Några allmänna synpunkter rörande världstrafikens utveckling: Utdrag ur en utredning rörande Shanghais hamn [Some general observations concerning the global transport development: Extract from a study on the Shanghai port] (in Swedish). Stockholm. SELIBR 2695826.
- Hugo von, Heidenstam (1912). Om faskinarbetens användande i stor skala vid vattenbyggnader [About the large scale usage of fascines when constructing water structures] (in Swedish). Stockholm. SELIBR 2695823.
- Hugo von, Heidenstam (1920). Om Kina just nu och svenska intressen i Kina [About China right now and Swedish interests in China] (in Swedish). Stockholm. SELIBR 2695824.
- Hugo von, Heidenstam (1917). Om Yangtzeflodens vattenföring: bidrag till hyllningsskrift tillägnade J. Gust. Richert på sextioårsdagen den 16 maj 1917 [About the Yangtze River water flow: contribution to the writing tribute dedicated to J. Gust. Richert on the sixtieth anniversary 16 May 1917] (in Swedish). Stockholm. SELIBR 2695825.
- Hugo von, Heidenstam (1919). The improvement of the Huang Pu river (Shanghai, China) for ocean navigation. Copy of a "Communication" to the 13th congress of the permanent international association of navigation congresses. S.l. SELIBR 2695822.

Diplomatic posts
Preceded by Eric Gyllenstierna	Envoy of Sweden to Iran; 1936–1942	Succeeded by Harald Pousette
Preceded by Eric Gyllenstierna	Envoy of Sweden to Iraq; 1936–1942	Succeeded by Harald Pousette
