= Harry Eriksson =

Swedish diplomat (1892–1957)

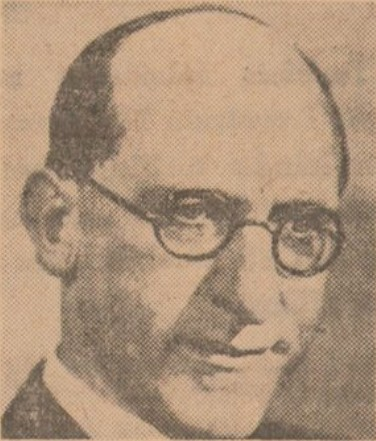
- Born: Johan Fridolf Harry Eriksson; 20 October 1892; Stockholm, Sweden
- Died: 14 March 1957 (aged 64); Stockholm, Sweden
- Resting place: Norra begravningsplatsen
- Occupation: Diplomat
- Years active: 1918–1952
- Spouse: Signe Burman (m. 1924)
- Children: 1

Johan Fridolf Harry Eriksson (20 October 1892 – 14 March 1957) was a Swedish diplomat. He served as Swedish envoy in Pretoria (1945–1948), in Tehran and in Baghdad (1948–1951), in Islamabad (1949–1951), and finally in Lima and La Paz in 1951.

== Early life ==
Eriksson was born on 20 October 1892 in Stockholm, Sweden.

== Career ==
Eriksson served as third chancery officer at the Consulate General in London in 1918, as acting second vice consul there 1921, in Dublin in 1926, and consul there in 1930 (acting in 1926). He was appointed commercial counselor at the Swedish legation in Washington, D.C. in 1937. When Sweden established a legation in Pretoria, South Africa in 1944 and Eriksson was appointed Acting envoy extraordinary and minister plenipotentiary, and became a regular in 1945. Eriksson then served as envoy in Tehran with a dual accreditation to Baghdad from 1948 to 1951. On 24 October 1949, Eriksson handed over his credentials to Governor General Khawaja Nazimuddin in Islamabad. He served in Pakistan until 1951. During 1951, he served as envoy in Lima with a dual accreditation to La Paz. From 1952, Eriksson was placed on standby at the Ministry for Foreign Affairs in Stockholm.

== Personal life ==
In 1924, Eriksson married Signe Burman (1901–1957), with whom he had a son, Jan C Eriksson (born 1928).

== Death ==
Eriksson died on 14 March 1957 in Stockholm. The funeral service was held on 21 March 1957 at Oscar's Church in Östermalm, Stockholm. He was interred on 21 March 1957 at Norra begravningsplatsen in Solna, near Stockholm. His wife Signe died two months later and was buried in the same grave.

== Awards and decorations ==
- (Sweden) Commander of the Order of the Polar Star (15 November 1944)
- (Pahlavi dynasty) Grand Cross of the Order of Homayoun
- (Hungary) Grand Cross of the Hungarian Order of Merit
- Commander 1st Class of the Order of the White Rose of Finland

== Bibliography ==
- Eriksson, Harry (1931). Irländska fristaten: En ekonomisk orientering [The Irish Free State: An Economic Orientation] (in Swedish). Stockholm: Sveriges allm. exportförening. SELIBR 1353730.

Diplomatic posts
Preceded by None	Envoy of Sweden to South Africa; 1945–1948	Succeeded by Carl Olof Gisle
Preceded by Harald Pousette	Envoy of Sweden to Iran; 1948–1951	Succeeded by Gunnar Jarring
Preceded by Harald Pousette	Envoy of Sweden to Iraq; 1948–1951	Succeeded by Gunnar Jarring
Preceded by None	Envoy of Sweden to Pakistan; 1949–1951	Succeeded by Gunnar Jarring
Preceded by Martin Kastengren	Envoy of Sweden to Peru; 1951–1952	Succeeded by Claes Westring
Preceded by Martin Kastengren	Envoy of Sweden to Bolivia; 1951–1952	Succeeded by Claes Westring
