= Tage Pousette =

Swedish diplomat

- Born: Sven Tage Pousette; 16 August 1921; Yokohama, Japan
- Died: 29 April 2012 (aged 90); Solna, Sweden
- Education: Stockholm University College
- Occupation: Diplomat
- Years active: 1948–1982
- Spouse: Gunilla Kugelberg (m. 1953)
- Children: 4
- Parent: Harald Pousette (father)

Sven Tage Pousette (16 August 1921 – 29 April 2012) was a Swedish diplomat.

== Early life ==
Pousette was born on 16 August 1921 during a stay of his father in Yokohama, Japan, the son of envoy Harald Pousette and his wife Cecilia (née Cedercrantz). He graduated as a reserve officer in 1942 and became a law graduate in Stockholm in 1948.

== Career ==
Pousette became an attaché at the Ministry for Foreign Affairs in 1948, served in Berlin and Bonn between 1949 and 1952, in Bern between 1952 and 1954, at the Foreign Ministry between 1954 and 1957, in Paris between 1957 and 1960 and was back at the Foreign Ministry from 1960 until 1964. Pousette was then an embassy adviser in Tehran from 1964 until 1969, in Lisbon from 1969 until 1975, and in The Hague from 1975 until 1977. He was then consul general in Minneapolis from 1978 to 1982.

== Personal life ==
In 1953 he married Gunilla Kugelberg (1931–2017), daughter of the director Bertil Kugelberg and Märta née Forsling. They had the following children: Thérese (born 1957), Caroline (born 1959), Pauline (born 1962) and Martin (born 1967). Tage Pousette is buried in Lidingö Cemetery.

Since 1955, during the periods when he was not stationed abroad, Pousette resided in Villa Sofieberg in Hagaparken in Solna Municipality just north of Stockholm.

== Awards and decorations ==
- (Sweden) For Zealous and Devoted Service of the Realm (22 August 1979)
- (Portugal) Commander of the Order of Prince Henry (24 January 1981)
- (Chile) Officer of the Order of Merit
- (France) Officer of the Order of the Black Star
- (Liberia) Officer of the Humane Order of African Redemption
- (Iceland) Knight's Cross of the Order of the Falcon (27 June 1957)
- (Tunisia) Officer of the TunRO?

Diplomatic posts
| Preceded by Per Olof Forshell | Consul General of Sweden to Minneapolis; 1978–1982 | Succeeded by Karl-Erik Andersson |
