= Embassy of Sweden, Baghdad =

Sweden's diplomatic mission in Iraq

- Location: Baghdad
- Address: Embassy of Sweden; P.O. Box 55550; Baghdad Post Office; Karadat Mariam; Baghdad; Iraq
- Opened: 1964
- Closed: 2023
- Jurisdiction: Iraq
- Special Envoy: Jörgen Lindström
- Website: Official website

The Embassy of Sweden in Baghdad is Sweden's diplomatic mission in Iraq. The mission consists of an embassy, a number of Swedes from the Ministry for Foreign Affairs and local staff. Ambassador since 2022 is Jessica Svärdström.

Sweden's diplomatic relations with Iraq go way back. Already in 1903 Sweden started at the King's initiative diplomatic relations with what was then the Ottoman Empire and a Swedish consulate was established. Today there is an embassy in Baghdad, reopened in summer 2009, after being closed since 1990. Sweden opened a Section Office in Erbil on 1 December 2011. The office is a part of the Swedish Embassy in Baghdad. The Office serve as a link between authorities and people in the Iraqi Kurdistan region and the Swedish Embassy in Baghdad.

== History ==
=== 1960s–1990s ===
Before 1963, the Swedish envoy to Tehran was also accredited to Baghdad. In February 1960, Sweden's envoy in Baghdad, Dick Hichens-Bergström, was appointed ambassador there following an agreement with the Iraqi government regarding diplomatic representation. At the same time, an embassy office was decided to be established in Baghdad. Göran Bundy, the first secretary of the Ministry for Foreign Affairs, was appointed as the first secretary. He was expected to assume his duties in Baghdad around March 10 the same year. In the so-called Swedish Ministry for Foreign Affairs investigation in December 1962, it was considered that the embassy office in Baghdad, which was subordinate to the Swedish embassy in Tehran, should become an independent embassy.

In 1964, a Swedish ambassador was accredited to Baghdad, and the embassy postal address was P.O. Box 2037, Alwiyah, Baghdad. In 1965, the embassy was located at Saadun Street. From 1966, the embassy was located at Kharrada Sharkiya 127 Z/1 and the chancellery at Nidhal Street 132/2, Saadoun.

=== Gulf War ===
On 14 January 1991 the embassy was evacuated before the US-led alliance's attack on Iraq on 17 January - after Iraq invaded Kuwait. The then Swedish ambassador (1988–1991) was Henry Amnéus. He had instructions from the Swedish Foreign Ministry to evacuate the embassy as soon as the UN Secretary-General Javier Pérez de Cuéllar departed. The Swedish Foreign Ministry telecom and communications expert Stig "Lina" Lindström and ambassador Amnéus closed the embassy and drove on Monday 14 January through northern Iraq and across the border to Turkey. Since then there was no permanent staffing in the Swedish Embassy. Sweden never broke off diplomatic relations, but the embassy was only unstaffed. The embassy was then located on Nidhal Street 132/2 in central Baghdad.

=== Iraq War ===
Around the former Swedish embassy where was a high wall reinforced with barbed wire. There were several houses in the area. The main house contained the embassy chancellery. There were also a smaller house containing backup power, storage, and also home of the guards. Nearby there were a row of houses which was destroyed during the war. It was the former seat of the trade department.

The Swedish embassy was highly acclaimed in the Swedish press at the beginning of the Iraq War in 2003, when it was abandoned by all but one man, the caretaker Ibrahim Ali Suza who had worked there for 35 years and refused to leave the building. The same thing happened when Iraq invaded Kuwait in the early 1990s and all left the embassy except the Iraqi Kurd who stayed and kept watch for looters and with the help of a number of Kalashnikovs and grenades. In April 2004, the embassy was hit by mortars. Parts of an annex of the embassy was damaged but the fire was put out by the caretaker.

Ibrahim Ali Suza was in June 2004 rewarded with a trip to Sweden and received the medals For Zealous and Devoted Service of the Realm as well as the North Star Medal for his contributions to the embassy during three wars. Ibrahim Ali Suza has since continued to guard the embassy and then had the help of a couple of security guards which the Iraqi authorities deployed. He is now retired but show up at the embassy now and then.

In September 2004, an Iraq Office was established in Amman, Jordan, as an interim solution because of the security situation in Baghdad as a result of the Iraq War. The embassy chancellery in Baghdad was closed in May 2005. In 2009, the Swedish embassy was again staffed with ambassador Niclas Trouvé as ambassador which has during the Iraq War been based in Amman.

=== New embassy ===
A new embassy was opened on 1 July 2009. It was inaugurated on 24 February 2010 by Swedish foreign minister Carl Bildt, Iraqi foreign minister Hoshyar Zebari and ambassador Niclas Trouvé before a crowd of 150 specially invited guests. The new embassy complex comprises three buildings and an extensive security area around. In addition to the new embassy and residence outside the International Zone (IZ), a small Swedish embassy offices opened up inside the IZ during construction. This was to serve as a fulcrum during construction and then used as a branch of the embassy to enable it to operate outside as well as inside the IZ when required. The embassy was moderately damaged in the August 2009 Baghdad bombings. The embassy is located about 500 meters from where one of the attacks took place. No member of the embassy staff were injured. The embassy building was shaken again during the 20 March 2012 Iraq attacks. This time the building wasn't damaged.

=== 2023 breaches of the embassy ===
On 29 June 2023, a group of protestors breached the embassy's perimeter. Protestors had taken to the streets on the orders of Muqtada al-Sadr. The previous day, a Quran had been burned during a protest in Stockholm.

On 20 July 2023 around 02:00 Arabia Standard Time (23:00 UTC, 19 July), the embassy was stormed by hundreds of protestors after police in Stockholm granted a permit for a demonstration there that is expected to feature another burning of a Quran. Fire and black smoke was seen coming from the embassy building. By dawn, Iraqi security forces and firefighters were inside the building. Iraq's foreign ministry issued a statement saying that they condemned the incident and that security forces had been instructed to investigate the incident swiftly. Swedish Minister for Foreign Affairs Tobias Billström stated that the embassy's staff was safe, though he also said that Iraq had failed in its responsibility under the Vienna Convention on Diplomatic Relations to protect the embassy. The convention's article 22 states in part that the host country "is under a special duty to [...] protect the premises of the mission against any intrusion or damage". The attack on the embassy was also condemned by the United States, Japan, Australia, the United Kingdom, and the European Union, with the U.S. calling Iraq's failure to protect the embassy "unacceptable".

Sweden's ambassador to Iraq was expelled from the country as a result of the diplomatic dispute. Iraq also recalled its chargé d'affaires from Sweden.

== Staff and tasks ==
=== Tasks ===
The Swedish embassy carries out the following operations:

- Monitoring and reporting on the political, social and economic developments in Iraq.
- Reporting on migration and human rights.
- Processing of consular and legal matters in Iraq.
- In collaboration with the Swedish International Development Cooperation Agency (SIDA) and NGOs support the implementation of the government's country strategy for development cooperation with Iraq.
- Strengthening economic relations with Iran and support Swedish companies operating in Iraq.

== See also ==
- Iraq–Sweden relations
