= List of ambassadors of Sweden to Pakistan =

Ambassador of Sweden to Pakistan
- Lesser coat of arms of the Kingdom of Sweden

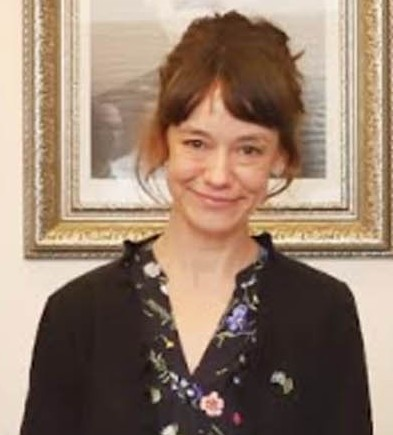
- Incumbent; Alexandra Berg von Linde since 2024
- Ministry for Foreign Affairs; Swedish Embassy, Islamabad
- Style: His or Her Excellency (formal); Mr. or Madam Ambassador (informal)
- Reports to: Minister for Foreign Affairs
- Seat: Islamabad, Pakistan
- Appointer: Government of Sweden
- Term length: No fixed term
- Inaugural holder: Harry Eriksson
- Formation: July 1949
- Website: Swedish Embassy, Islamabad

The Ambassador of Sweden to Pakistan (known formally as the Ambassador of the Kingdom of Sweden to the Islamic Republic of Pakistan) is the official representative of the government of Sweden to the president of Pakistan and government of Pakistan.

== History ==
In July 1949, the King in Council decided to establish diplomatic relations with Pakistan. The envoy to Tehran and Baghdad, Harry Eriksson, was also appointed as envoy to Karachi. On 24 October 1949, Envoy Eriksson presented his credentials to the Governor-General, Khawaja Nazimuddin. Eriksson conveyed well-wishes to Pakistan from King Gustaf V and the Swedish people.

In March 1956, Gösta Brunnström was appointed Sweden's first resident envoy to Karachi. On 12 April 1956, he presented his credentials to President Iskander Mirza.

In August 1956, an agreement was reached between the Swedish and Pakistani governments on the mutual elevation of the respective countries' legations to embassies. The diplomatic rank was thereafter changed to ambassador instead of envoy extraordinary and minister plenipotentiary. Sweden's newly appointed minister there, Gösta Brunnström, was appointed as ambassador.

After Sweden established diplomatic relations with the Maldives on 21 August 1978, the Swedish ambassador in Islamabad was also accredited to Malé that same year. In 1995, this accreditation was transferred to the Swedish ambassador in New Delhi. Between 2002 and 2008, the Swedish ambassador in Islamabad was also accredited to Kabul, Afghanistan.

== List of representatives ==
Name	Period	Title	Notes	Ref
Harry Eriksson	1949–1951	Envoy	Resident in Tehran.	
Gunnar Jarring	1951–1952	Envoy	Resident in Tehran.	
Torsten Hylander	1952–1952	Chargé d'affaires ad interim (Note: Held the diplomatic rank of secretary.)		
Ragnvald Bagge	1953–1956	Envoy	Resident in Tehran.	
Gösta Brunnström	March 1956 – August 1956	Envoy		
Gösta Brunnström	August 1956 – 1960	Ambassador		
Hugo Ärnfast	1960–1964	Ambassador		
Lennart Finnmark	1964–1969	Ambassador		
Bengt Odhner	1969–1973	Ambassador		
Rune Nyström	1974–1977	Ambassador		
Bengt Rösiö	1977–1979	Ambassador	Also accredited to Malé (from 1978).	
Carl-Johan Groth	1979–1983	Ambassador	Also accredited to Malé.	
Sten Strömholm	1983–1985	Ambassador	Also accredited to Malé.	
Gunnar Hultner	1985–1990	Ambassador	Also accredited to Malé (from 1986).	
Ian Paulsson	1990–1995	Ambassador	Also accredited to Malé.	
Nils Rosenberg	1995–1999	Ambassador		
Peter Tejler	1999–2003	Ambassador	Also accredited to Kabul (from 2002).	
Ann Wilkens	2003–2007	Ambassador	Also accredited to Kabul.	
Anna Karin Eneström	2007–2009	Ambassador	Also accredited to Kabul (until 2008).	
Ulrika Sundberg	2009–2011	Ambassador		
Lars-Hjalmar Wide	2011–2013	Ambassador		
Tomas Rosander	2013–2016	Ambassador		
Ingrid Johansson	1 May 2016 – 2020	Ambassador		
Henrik Persson	September 2020 – 2024	Ambassador		
Alexandra Berg von Linde	2024–present	Ambassador		
