= Harald Sandberg =

Swedish diplomat and civil servant

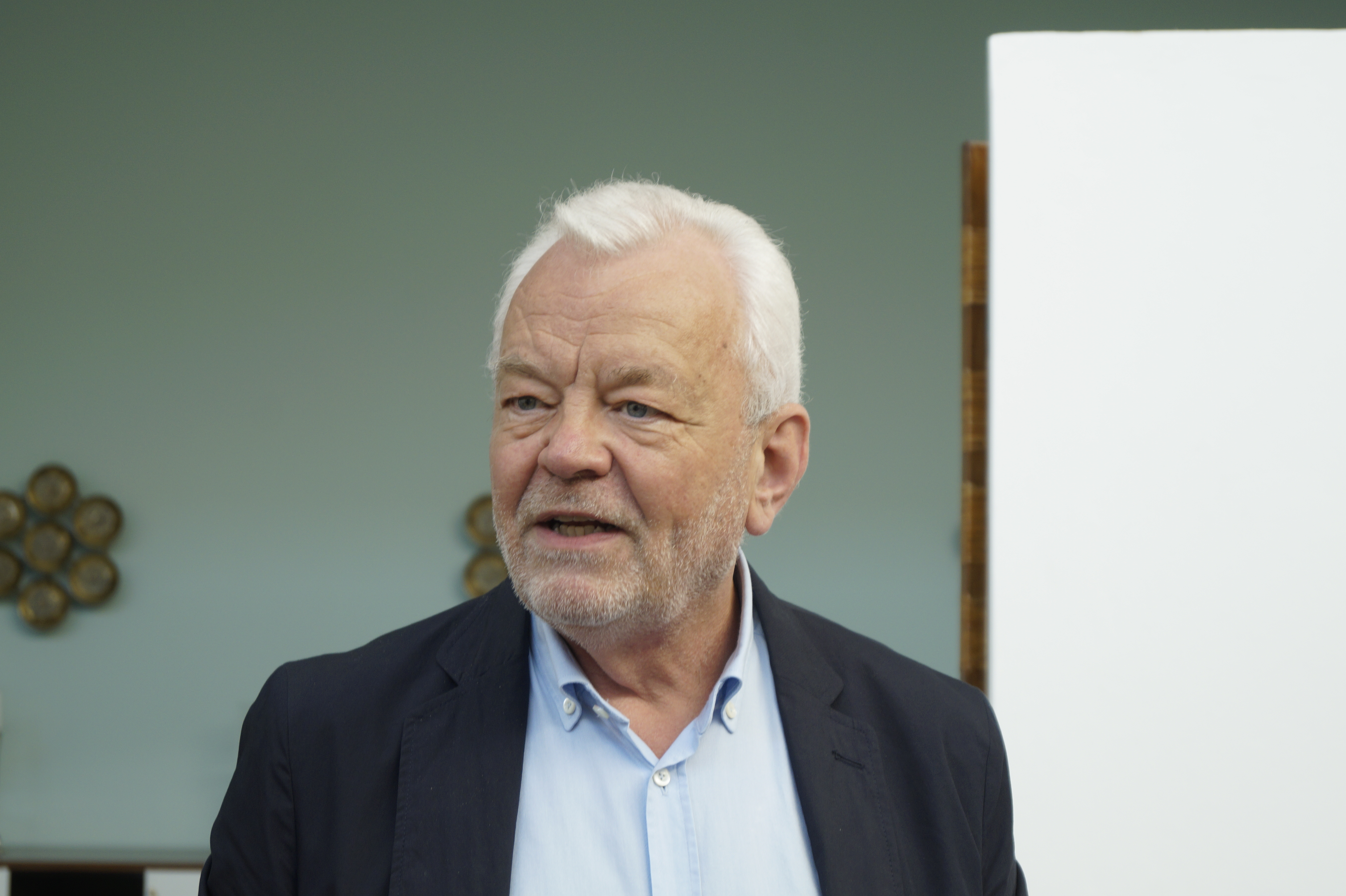
- Sandberg in 2017.
- Born: Harald Nils Erik Sandberg; 12 March 1950 (age 76); Uppsala, Sweden
- Education: Uppsala University
- Occupation: Diplomat
- Years active: 1976–2017
- Spouse: Else Albrektsson (m. 1977)
- Children: 2

Harald Nils Erik Sandberg (born 12 March 1950) is a Swedish diplomat and civil servant.

== Early life ==
Sandberg was born on 12 March 1950 in Uppsala, Sweden, the son of Erik Sandberg and his wife Louise (née von Hofsten). He received a Fil kand from Uppsala University in 1974 and worked as first curator at Stockholms nation in Uppsala from 1974 to 1975 and served as Curator Curatorum in 1975.

== Career ==
Sandberg joined the Ministry for Foreign Affairs as a trainee in 1976, served in Seoul from 1977 to 1979, and at Sweden's Permanent Mission to the International Organizations in Geneva from 1980 to 1983. He held various roles at the Ministry from 1983 to 1987, was posted to Washington, D.C. from 1987 to 1991, and was appointed director (kansliråd) in 1991. From 1991 to 1994, he headed the Europe and Foreign Trade Minister's Office, and in 1992 was promoted to director (departementsråd). He served as Deputy Head of the Ministry's EU Secretariat from 1994 to 1996, and Deputy Head of the Trade Policy Department from 1996 to 1998. Sandberg was chairman of the Foreign Ministry's motorcycle club from 1997 to 1998. He was appointed ambassador to Indonesia in 1998. He served in this position until 2003. with dual accreditation in Timor-Leste (2002–2003), Sandberg then served as ambassador to South Korea from 2003 to 2005. In September 2005, Ambassador Sandberg received a decoration from the Korean national Red Cross for his work for Human Rights in North Korea

Having acted as an observer in the 1999 East Timorese elections and headed up the Swedish response to the 2002 Bali bombing, Sandberg was selected in July 2006 by the Swedish government to head up its mission to evacuate Swedish citizens from war ravaged Lebanon.

Back at the Foreign Ministry in Stockholm, Sandberg served as Head of Department for the EU Internal Market and for Promotion of Swedish Trade (2005–2008) and the Foreign Service's Head of Department for Human Resources (2008–2012). Sandberg then served as ambassador to India from 2012 to 2017. Following his retirement from the foreign service in 2017, he worked as an adviser to Swedish industry.

== Personal life ==
In 1977, Sandberg married Else Albrektsson (born 1951), the daughter of Bonde Albrektsson and Signe (née Håkansson).

Diplomatic posts
Preceded by Mikael Lindström	Ambassador of Sweden to Indonesia; 1998–2003	Succeeded by Lennart Linnér
Preceded by None	Ambassador of Sweden to Timor-Leste; 2002–2003	Succeeded by Lennart Linnér
Preceded by Bo Lundberg	Ambassador of Sweden to South Korea; 2003–2005	Succeeded by Lars Vargö
Preceded by Lars-Olof Lindgren	Ambassador of Sweden to India; 2012–2017	Succeeded by Klas Molin
Preceded by Lars-Olof Lindgren	Ambassador of Sweden to Bhutan; 2012–2017	Succeeded by Klas Molin
Preceded by Lars-Olof Lindgren	Ambassador of Sweden to the Maldives; 2012–2017	Succeeded by Klas Molin
Preceded by Lars-Olof Lindgren	Ambassador of Sweden to Nepal; 2012–2017	Succeeded by Klas Molin
Preceded by Lars-Olof Lindgren	Ambassador of Sweden to Sri Lanka; 2012–2017	Succeeded by Klas Molin
