= Ragnvald Bagge =

Swedish diplomat

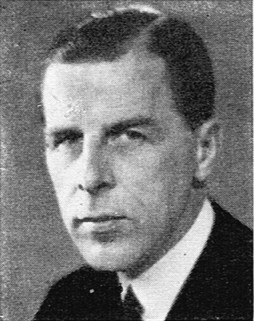
- Born: Ragnvald R:son Bagge; 12 November 1903; Quebec City, Canada
- Died: 24 March 1991 (aged 87); Saltsjöbaden, Sweden
- Other name: "Kenty"
- Education: Stockholm University College
- Occupation: Diplomat
- Years active: 1928–1969
- Spouse: Susanna Lagerborg (m. 1948)
- Children: 4

Ragnvald Richardson (R:son) Bagge (12 November 1903 – 24 March 1991) was a Swedish diplomat. Bagge began his diplomatic career at the Swedish Ministry for Foreign Affairs in 1928 as an attaché. He held early postings in Washington, D.C., Madrid, and Tokyo, and served as secretary to the minister for foreign affairs and later as secretary to the Committee on Foreign Affairs. He progressed through the ranks as legation counsellor in Helsinki, director at the Ministry, and chargé d'affaires and envoy in Bogotá and Panama City.

Bagge then served as embassy counsellor and minister plenipotentiary in Washington, D.C., before taking up envoy and ambassadorial positions in Tehran (also accredited to Baghdad and Karachi), Warsaw, Ottawa, and Copenhagen, concluding his career as ambassador in Copenhagen from 1965 to 1969.

== Early life ==
Bagge was born on 12 November 1903 in Quebec City, Quebec, Canada, the son of the consul general there, Richard Bagge, and his wife Lily (née Schwartz). He received a Candidate of Law degree from Stockholm University College in 1926 and then studied abroad for a couple of years.

== Career ==
Bagge joined the Ministry for Foreign Affairs in Stockholm as an attaché in 1928. He served in Washington, D.C., from 1929 to 1930 and in Madrid in 1931, and was secretary to the minister for foreign affairs from 1932 to 1933. Bagge was second secretary in Tokyo from 1934 to 1936 and first secretary at the Foreign Ministry in 1937. Between 1938 and 1939, he was notary to the Committee on Foreign Affairs and became its secretary in 1940.

Subsequently, Bagge served as legation counsellor in Helsinki from 1941 to 1943, director in 1944, chargé d'affaires in Bogotá from 1948 to 1949, and envoy in Bogotá and non-resident envoy in Panama City from 1949 to 1950. He was embassy counsellor and minister plenipotentiary in Washington, D.C., in 1950, and envoy in Tehran—also accredited to Baghdad from 1953 to 1959 and to Karachi from 1953 to 1956. He served as ambassador in Tehran from 1957 to 1959, ambassador in Warsaw from 1959 to 1962, ambassador in Ottawa from 1962 to 1965, and finally ambassador in Copenhagen from 1965 to 1969.

== Personal life ==
In 1948, Bagge married Finnish-born Susanna Renata Lagerborg (1913–2004), the daughter of the professor of philosophy at the University of Helsinki Rolf Lagerborg and Elna (née Selin).

Bagge had four children: Alette, Richard, Madeleine, and Veronica.

== Death ==
Bagge died on 24 March 1991 in Saltsjöbaden, Stockholm County, Sweden. The funeral took place on 3 April 1991 in Saltsjöbaden Church. He was interred on 24 May 1991 at Skogsö Cemetery in Saltsjöbaden.

== Awards and decorations ==
- (Sweden) Commander 1st Class of the Order of the Polar Star
- (Colombia) Grand Officer of the Order of Boyaca
- (Denmark) Commander of the Order of the Dannebrog
- Commander of the Order of the Lion of Finland
- (Japan) 3rd Class of the Order of the Sacred Treasure
- (Netherlands) Commander of the Order of Orange-Nassau
- (Norway) Commander of the Order of St. Olav
- Knight 1st Class of the Order of the White Rose of Finland
- (Spain) Knight of the Order of Isabella the Catholic
- (Austria) Officer of the Austrian Order of Merit

== Bibliography ==
- Bagge, Ragnvald (1978). Släkten Bagge från Marstrand: andra huvudgrenens 2:a gren [The Bagge family from Marstrand: the 2nd branch of the second main branch] (in Swedish). [Stockholm]: The author. SELIBR 367255.

Diplomatic posts
Preceded by Karl Yngve Vendel	Chargé d'affaires of Sweden to Colombia; 1948–1949	Succeeded by Himself as Envoy
Preceded by Himself as Chargé d'affaires	Envoy of Sweden to Colombia; 1949–1950	Succeeded by Brynolf Eng
Preceded by Herbert Ribbing	Envoy of Sweden to Panama; 1949–1950	Succeeded by Brynolf Eng
Preceded by Gunnar Jarring	Envoy/Ambassador of Sweden to Iran; 1953–1959	Succeeded by Dick Hichens-Bergström
Preceded by Gunnar Jarring	Envoy of Sweden to Iraq; 1953–1959	Succeeded by Dick Hichens-Bergström
Preceded by Gunnar Jarring	Envoy of Sweden to Pakistan; 1953–1956	Succeeded by Gösta Brunnström
Preceded by Gunnar Reuterskiöld	Envoy of Sweden to Poland; 1959–1962	Succeeded by Erik Kronvall
Preceded by Oscar Thorsing	Ambassador of Sweden to Canada; 1962–1965	Succeeded by Per Lind
Preceded by Rolf Sohlman	Ambassador of Sweden to Denmark; 1965–1969	Succeeded by Herman Kling
