= List of ambassadors of Sweden to Timor-Leste =

Ambassador of Sweden to Timor-Leste
- Lesser coat of arms of the Kingdom of Sweden

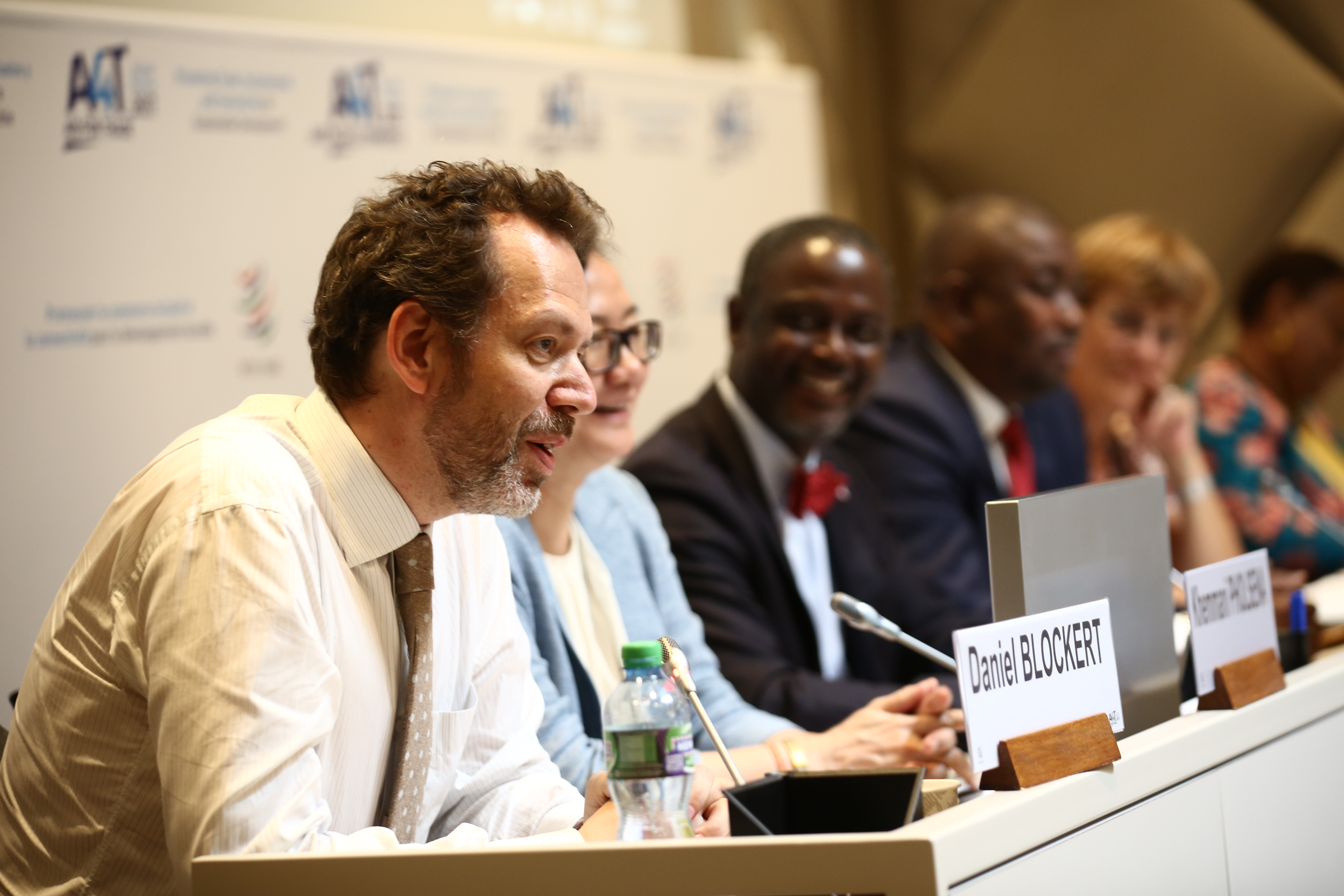
- Incumbent; Daniel Blockert since 2023
- Ministry for Foreign Affairs; Swedish Embassy, Jakarta
- Style: His or Her Excellency (formal); Mr. or Madam Ambassador (informal)
- Reports to: Minister for Foreign Affairs
- Seat: Jakarta, Indonesia (Note: Swedish ambassador to Dili, Timor-Leste is based in Jakarta, Indonesia.)
- Appointer: Government of Sweden
- Term length: No fixed term
- Inaugural holder: Harald Sandberg
- Formation: 2002

The Ambassador of Sweden to Timor-Leste (known formally as the Ambassador of the Kingdom of Sweden to the Democratic Republic of Timor-Leste) is the official representative of the government of Sweden to the president of Timor-Leste and government of Timor-Leste. Since Sweden does not have an embassy in Dili, Sweden's ambassador to Timor-Leste is based in Jakarta, Indonesia.

== History ==
The Swedish government decided on 8 May 2002 to enter into an agreement on the establishment of diplomatic relations with Timor-Leste through an exchange of notes. The agreement was signed in Stockholm on 20 May 2002 and on 22 May 2002 in Dili. The agreement entered into force on 20 May 2002, the same day that Timor-Leste became independent. The same year, Sweden's ambassador in Jakarta, Indonesia, was also accredited to Timor-Leste's capital, Dili.

== List of representatives ==
Name	Period	Title	Notes	Presented credentials	Ref
Harald Sandberg	2002–2003	Ambassador	Resident in Jakarta.		
Lennart Linnér	2003–2007	Ambassador	Resident in Jakarta		
Ann Marie Bolin Pennegård	2007–2009	Ambassador	Resident in Jakarta		
Ewa Polano	September 2009 – 20 June 2014	Ambassador	Resident in Jakarta		
Johanna Brismar Skoog	2014–2018	Ambassador	Resident in Jakarta	17 February 2015	
Marina Berg	2018–2023	Ambassador	Resident in Jakarta	20 February 2020	
Daniel Blockert	2023–present	Ambassador	Resident in Jakarta	19 February 2024	
