= Brynolf Eng =

Swedish diplomat (1910–1988)

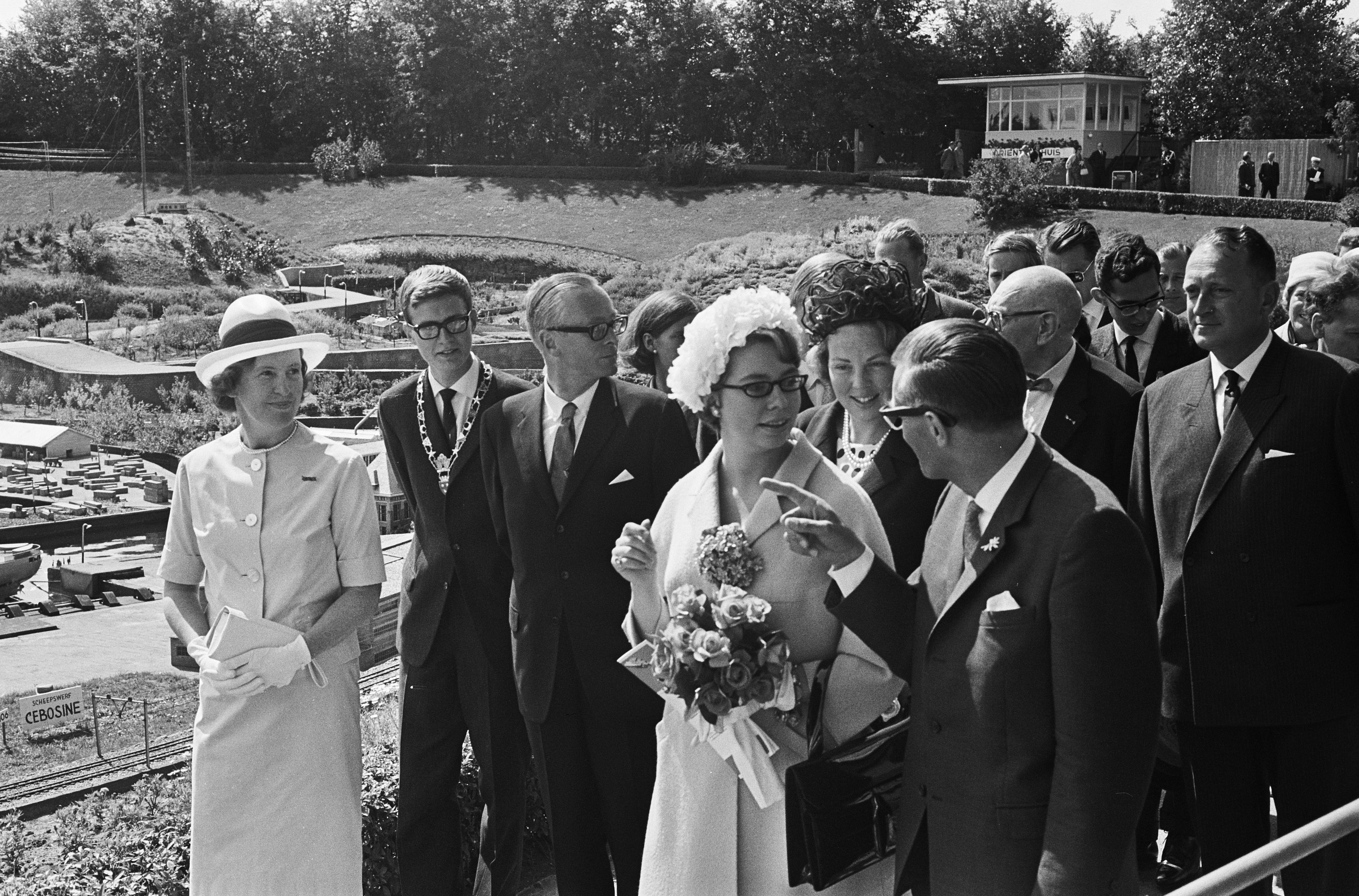
- Eng (third from left) with Princess Christina and Princess Beatrix in The Hague, 15 June 1964.
- Born: Carl Brynolf Julius Eng; 4 July 1910; Roslags-Bro, Sweden
- Died: 23 March 1988 (aged 77); Cannes, France
- Education: Stockholm University College
- Occupation: Diplomat
- Years active: 1932–1975
- Spouse(s): Wanda Gyllenstierna (m. 1938, divorced) Annelise Pedersen (m. 1945)
- Children: 3
- Relatives: Eric Gyllenstierna (father-in-law)

Carl Brynolf Julius Eng (4 July 1910 – 23 March 1988) was a Swedish diplomat, serving in numerous key postings across Europe, the Middle East, and Latin America from the 1930s to the 1970s. After entering the Ministry for Foreign Affairs in 1933, he was posted early on to Berlin, Moscow, and Helsinki, where he participated in negotiations with the Soviet Union, Denmark, and Finland during World War II.

In the postwar years, Eng served in Warsaw, Berlin, and Danzig, where he handled Swedish-Polish and Swedish-German negotiations, particularly in trade and technical matters. He later held senior roles as envoy and ambassador in Bogotá, Cairo, Riyadh, The Hague, Rome, Valletta, Moscow, and Ulaanbaatar.

Beyond his diplomatic service, Eng was active in international organizations such as the FAO, where he chaired and served on several committees, and in cultural exchange institutions, particularly in fostering Swedish-Italian relations. He also published numerous scholarly and economic articles, contributing to both legal and cultural discourse.

== Early life ==
Eng was born on 4 July 1910 in Roslags-Bro, Norrtälje Municipality, Sweden, the son of director Ruben Eng and his wife Elsa (née Stenström). He passed studentexamen in Stockholm 1929 and received a Candidate of Law degree in 1932 before becoming an attaché at the Ministry for Foreign Affairs in Stockholm in 1933.

== Career ==
Eng served in Berlin in 1935 and in Moscow in 1936, and he was acting second legation secretary in 1938. He served as acting second secretary at the Foreign Ministry in Stockholm in 1939 and as first acting secretary in 1940. He acted as secretary in various negotiations with the Soviet Union in 1940 and 1941, and as secretary and representative in trade negotiations with Denmark in 1941–1942 and with Finland from 1942 to 1944. Eng then became first legation secretary in Helsinki in 1944 (temporarily in 1942). He served in Warsaw in 1945, acting as the Swedish government's delegate to the Provisional Government of National Unity. That same year, Eng was given the title of legation counselor and served as acting consul in Danzig. In 1946, he became first legation secretary in Warsaw and acted as chairman and representative in negotiations with Poland from 1945 to 1947.

Eng was acting legation counselor in 1946 and legation counselor in 1947. He also chaired the Swedish-Polish Technical Committee in 1947 and led railway negotiations with the Soviet occupation zone in Germany from 1947 to 1949. He served at the Swedish Legation in Berlin in 1947 as legation counselor and consul, and held the position of consul general in 1948. He represented Sweden in trade and payment negotiations with Germany from 1948 to 1949. Eng then became envoy in Bogotá, as well as non-resident envoy in Panama City in 1950 and in Quito from 1951. He was envoy in Cairo and non-resident envoy in Beirut and Damascus in 1955. In 1957, Eng was appointed ambassador in Cairo and non-resident ambassador in Riyadh. That same year, the Canadian ambassador in Cairo, E. Herbert Norman, committed suicide by jumping from Eng's apartment building. Two years later, Eng continued as ambassador in Cairo and envoy in Riyadh. He was ambassador in The Hague from 1961 to 1965 and in Rome from 1966 to 1973, as well as non-resident ambassador in Valletta from 1969 to 1973. Eng's final posting before retirement was as ambassador in Moscow and non-resident ambassador in Ulaanbaatar from 1973 to 1975.

An obituary recounts that Eng had the opportunity to demonstrate his impressive language skills by giving a speech in Russian when he arrived at the Kremlin to present his credentials to the head of state of the Soviet Union, Nikolai Podgorny. The gesture was greatly appreciated by the Russian host, who then invited Eng into a private study, where they conversed for over an hour.

Eng was chairman of the Italy Department of the Svenska Rominstitutets Vänners (“Friends of the Swedish Institute in Rome”) and of the Special Committee on Management Staff/Relations of the Food and Agriculture Organization (FAO). He was vice chairman of the FAO Appeals Committee, and an honorary member of the Swedish Chamber of Commerce in The Hague and the Swedish School Association in Rome. Eng wrote numerous journal articles on legal subjects and papers in economic publications, including Il Mezzogiorno (on developments in southern Italy), as well as a large number of Italian-language anthologies relating to Swedish-Italian relations and cultural contacts.

== Personal life ==
In 1938, Eng married Baroness Wanda Gyllenstierna (1917–1982), the daughter of Baron Eric Gyllenstierna and Wanda Henriksson. They divorced and he married Annelise Pedersen (born 1916), the daughter of Aage Pedersen and Anna Lottenburger. He was the father of Peter (born 1946), Camilla (born 1948), and Monica (born 1950).

== Death ==
Eng died on 23 March 1988 in Cannes, France.

== Awards and decorations ==
- (Sweden) Commander of the Order of the Polar Star
- (Colombia) Grand Cross of the Order of San Carlos
- (Ecuador) Grand Cross of the National Order of Merit
- (Lebanon) Grand Cross of the National Order of the Cedar
- (Panama) Grand Cross of the Order of Vasco Núñez de Balboa
- (Colombia) Grand Officer of Order of Industrial Merit (Orden del Mérito Industrial)
- (Syria) Grand Officer of the Order of Civil Merit of the Syrian Arab Republic
- Commander of the Order of the Crown of Italy (20 October 1941)
- (Netherlands) Officer of the Order of Orange-Nassau
- (Denmark) Knight of the Order of the Dannebrog
- Knight First Class of the Order of the White Rose of Finland
- (Norway) Knight First Class of the Order of St. Olav
- (Poland) First Class of the Cross of Merit
- (Egypt) Grand Cross of the Order of the Republic

== Bibliography ==
- Eng, Brynolf (1970). Il Mezzogiorno: en redovisning av fakta och uttalanden belysande utvecklingen i området (in Swedish). Stockholm: Exportfören. SELIBR 1866812.

Diplomatic posts
Preceded by None	Consul general of Sweden in Berlin; 1948–1950	Succeeded by Eyvind Bratt
Preceded by Ragnvald Bagge	Envoy of Sweden to Colombia; 1950–1955	Succeeded by Leif Öhrvall
Preceded by Ragnvald Bagge	Envoy of Sweden to Panama; 1950–1955	Succeeded by Leif Öhrvall
Preceded by Martin Kastengren	Envoy of Sweden to Ecuador; 1951–1955	Succeeded by Leif Öhrvall
Preceded by Gustaf Weidel	Envoy/Ambassador of Sweden to Egypt; 1955–1961	Succeeded by Sven Dahlman
Preceded by Gustaf Weidel	Envoy of Sweden to Lebanon; 1955–1957	Succeeded by Åke Sjölin
Preceded by Gustaf Weidel	Ambassador of Sweden to Syria; 1955–1957	Succeeded by Åke Sjölin
Preceded by None	Envoy of Sweden to Saudi Arabia; 1957–1960	Succeeded by Gösta Brunnström
Preceded by Sven Dahlman	Ambassador of Sweden to the Netherlands; 1961–1965	Succeeded by Jens Malling
Preceded by Eric von Post	Ambassador of Sweden to Italy; 1966–1973	Succeeded by Dick Hichens-Bergström
Preceded by None	Ambassador of Sweden to Malta; 1966–1973	Succeeded by Dick Hichens-Bergström
Preceded by Gunnar Jarring	Ambassador of Sweden to the Soviet Union; 1973–1975	Succeeded by Göran Ryding
Preceded by Gunnar Jarring	Ambassador of Sweden to Mongolia; 1973–1975	Succeeded by Göran Ryding
