= List of ambassadors of Sweden to India =

Ambassador of Sweden to India
- Lesser coat of arms of the Kingdom of Sweden
- Incumbent; Petra Menander since August 2026
- Ministry for Foreign Affairs; Swedish Embassy, New Delhi
- Style: His or Her Excellency (formal); Mr. or Madam Ambassador (informal)
- Reports to: Minister for Foreign Affairs
- Residence: 4-5 Nyaya Marg, Chanakyapuri (Note: The ambassador's residence is at the same location as the chancery.)
- Seat: New Delhi, India
- Appointer: Government of Sweden
- Term length: No fixed term
- Inaugural holder: Gunnar Jarring
- Formation: 1948
- Website: Swedish Embassy, New Delhi

The Ambassador of Sweden to India (known formally as the Ambassador of the Kingdom of Sweden to the Republic of India) is the official representative of the government of Sweden to the president of India and government of India.

== History ==
The first Swedish minister in India, envoy Gunnar Jarring, presented his credentials to the Indian Governor-General C. Rajagopalachari on 9 November 1948.

In August 1956, an agreement was reached between the Swedish and Indian governments on the mutual elevation of the respective countries' legations to embassies. The diplomatic rank was thereafter changed to ambassador instead of envoy extraordinary and minister plenipotentiary.

The Swedish ambassador has been concurrently accredited to neighboring countries since 1950: Bangladesh (1972–1977), Burma/Myanmar (1956–1959), Bhutan (1985–present), Maldives (1995–present), Nepal (1960–present), and Sri Lanka (1950–present).

== List of representatives ==
Name	Period	Title	Notes	Presented credentials	Ref
Gunnar Jarring	1948–1951	Envoy	Also accredited to Colombo (from 1950).	9 November 1948	
Per Wijkman	1951–1955	Envoy	Also accredited to Colombo.		
Alva Myrdal	3 December 1955 – 26 October 1956	Envoy	Also accredited to Colombo (from 1956) and Rangoon (1956–1959).		
Alva Myrdal	27 October 1956 – 1 April 1961	Ambassador	Also accredited to Colombo, Kathmandu (from 1960), and Rangoon.		
Klas Böök	1961–1965	Ambassador	Also accredited to Colombo and Kathmandu.		
Gunnar Heckscher	1965–1970	Ambassador	Also accredited to Colombo and Kathmandu.		
Axel Lewenhaupt	1970–1975	Ambassador	Also accredited to Colombo, Dhaka (from 1972), and Kathmandu.		
Lennart Finnmark	1975–1983	Ambassador	Also accredited to Colombo, Dhaka (until 1977), and Kathmandu (1975–1983).		
Torsten Örn	1978–1979	Chargé d'affaires			
Axel Edelstam	1983–1987	Ambassador	Also accredited to Colombo, Kathmandu, and Thimphu (from 1985).		
Örjan Berner	1987–1989	Ambassador	Also accredited to Colombo, Kathmandu, and Thimphu.		
Pär Kettis	1989–1994	Ambassador	Also accredited to Colombo, Kathmandu, and Thimphu.		
Karl-Göran Engström	1994–1999	Ambassador	Also accredited to Colombo, Kathmandu, Malé (from 1995), and Thimphu.		
Johan Nordenfelt	2000–2004	Ambassador	Also accredited to Colombo, Kathmandu, Malé, and Thimphu.	3 August 2000	
Inga Eriksson Fogh	2004–2006	Ambassador	Also accredited to Colombo, Kathmandu, Malé, and Thimphu.	7 May 2004	
Lars-Olof Lindgren	2007–2012	Ambassador	Also accredited to Colombo, Kathmandu, Malé, and Thimphu.	13 March 2007	
Harald Sandberg	2012–2017	Ambassador	Also accredited to Colombo, Kathmandu, Malé, and Thimphu.	13 July 2012	
Klas Molin	September 2017 – 2022	Ambassador	Also accredited to Colombo, Kathmandu, Malé, and Thimphu.	23 November 2017	
Jan Thesleff	2022–2026	Ambassador	Also accredited to Colombo, Kathmandu, Malé, and Thimphu.	26 October 2022	
Petra Menander	August 2026 – present	Ambassador			

== Gallery ==
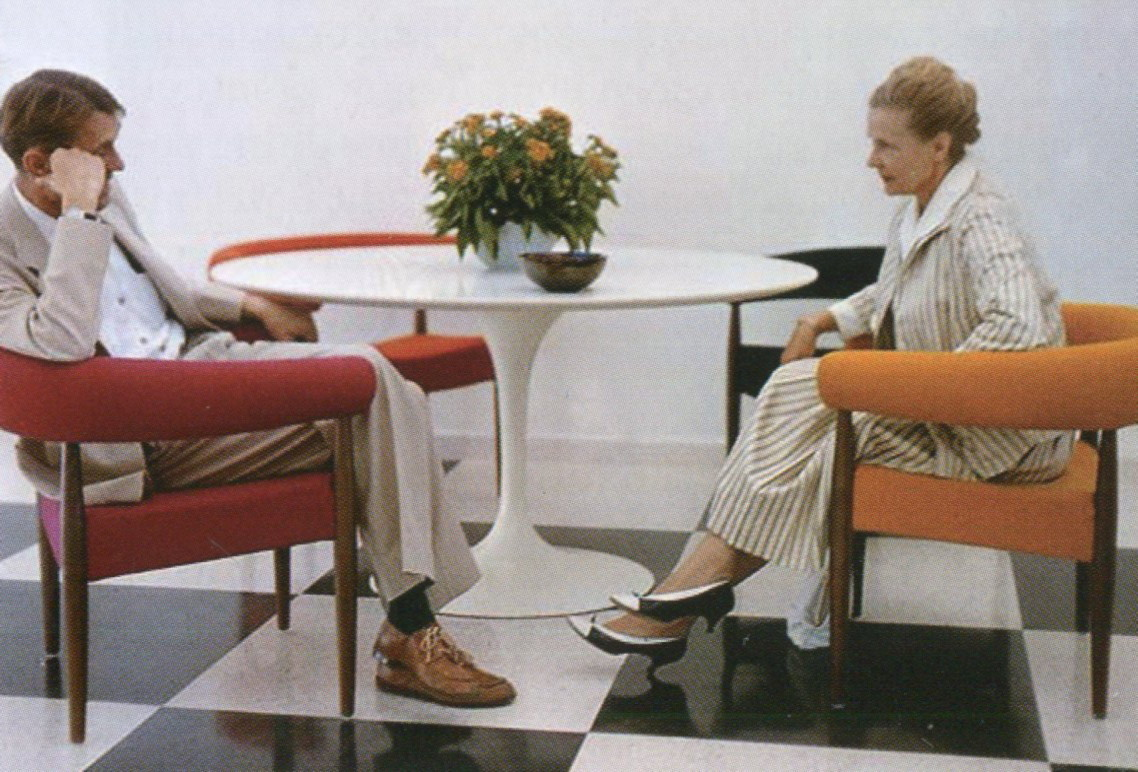
Ambassador Alva Myrdal (1955–1961) and Sune Lindström.

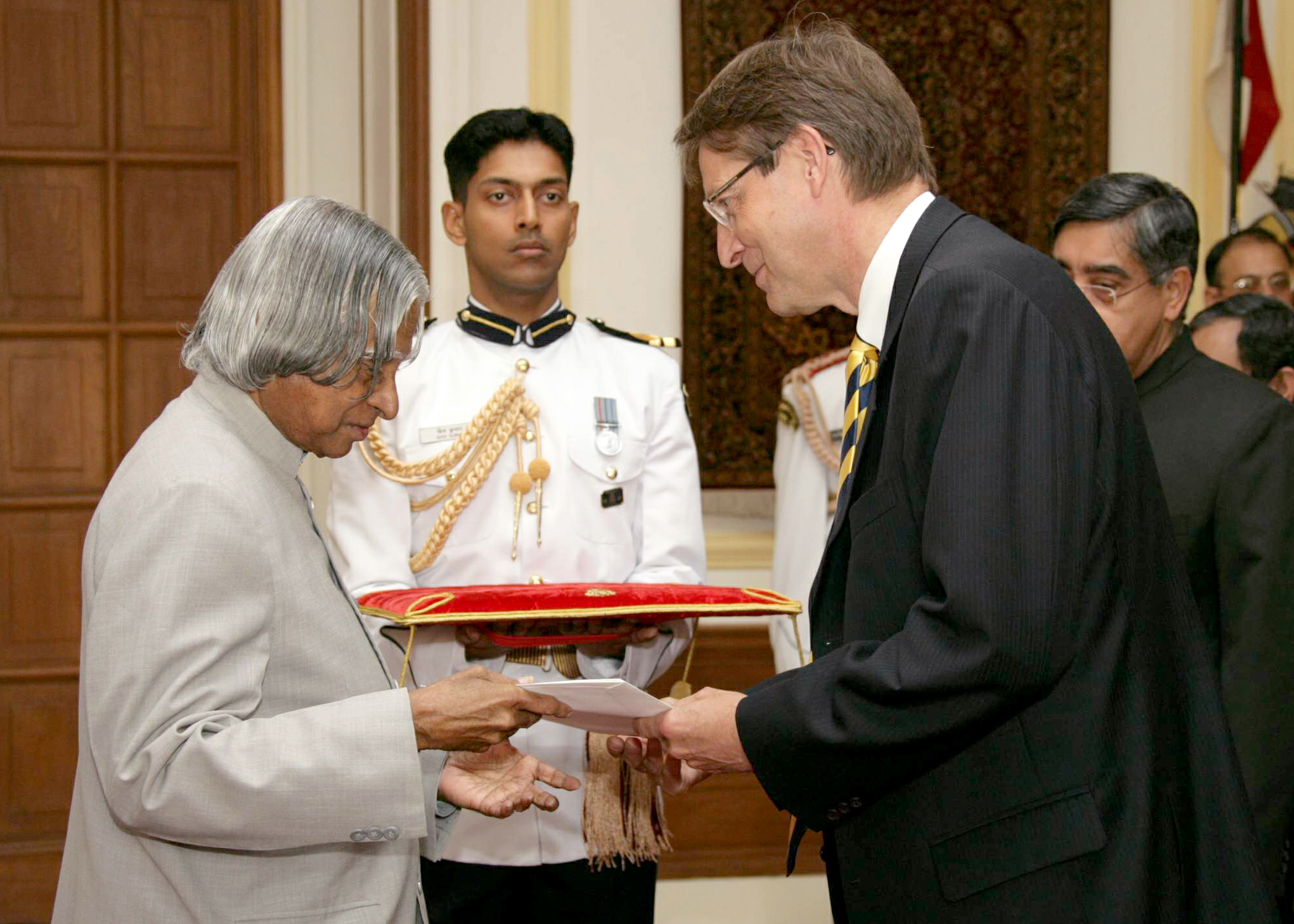
Ambassador Lars-Olof Lindgren (2007–2012) and President A. P. J. Abdul Kalam.

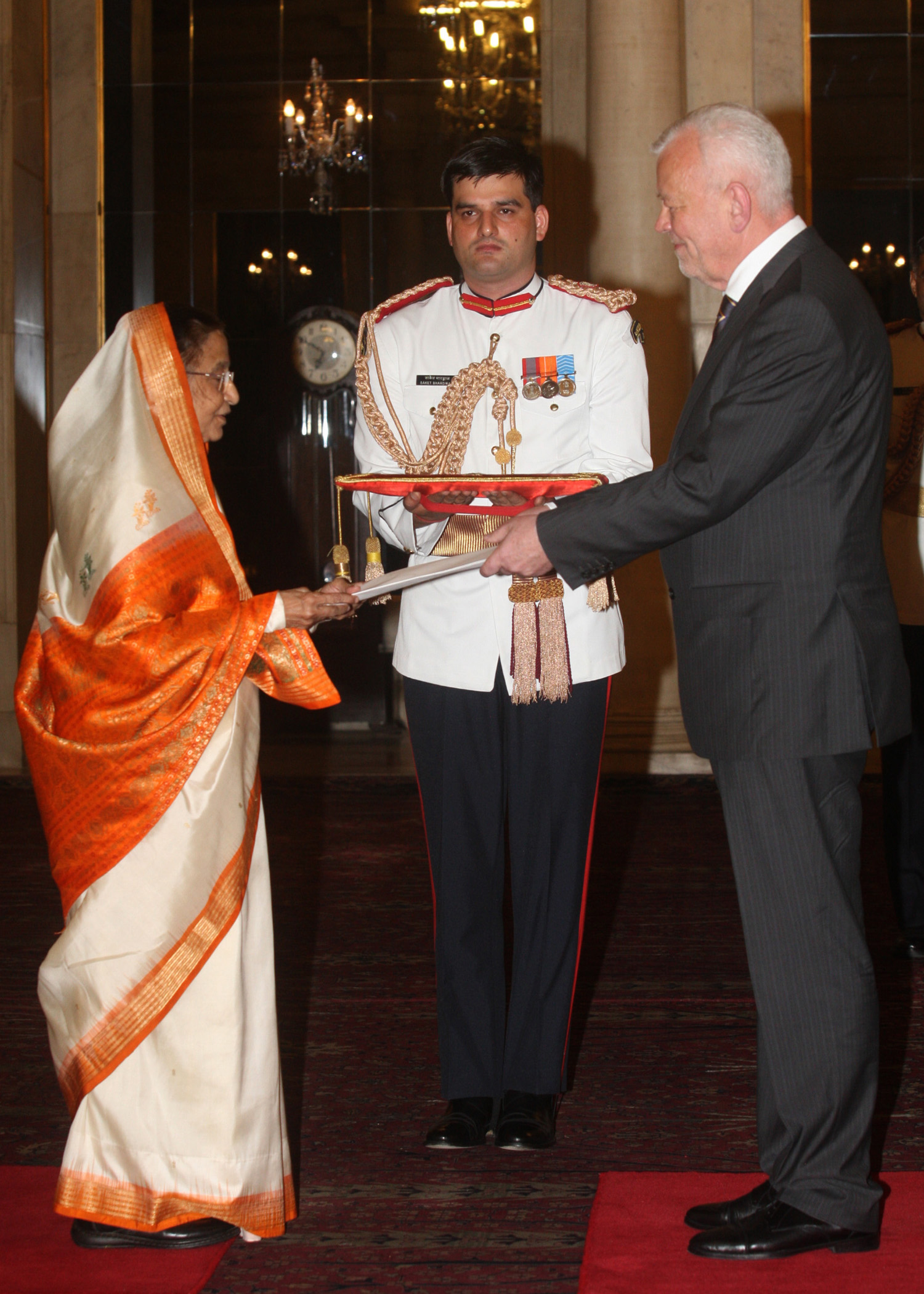
Ambassador Harald Sandberg (2012–2017) and President Pratibha Patil.

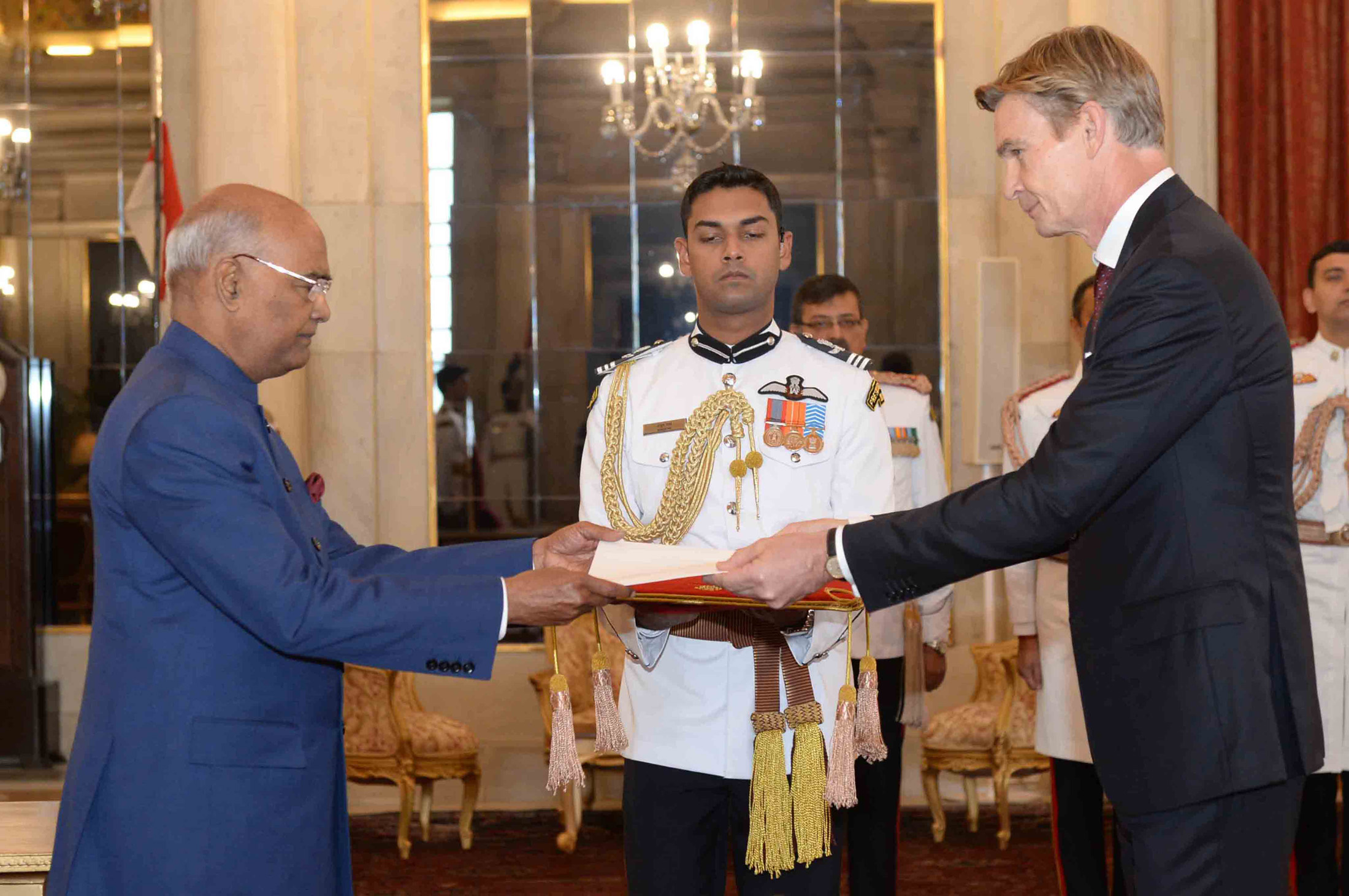
Ambassador Klas Molin (2017–2022) and President Ram Nath Kovind.

== See also ==
- India–Sweden relations
- Embassy of Sweden, New Delhi
