= United Nations Security Council Resolution 331 =

UN Security Council Resolution 331
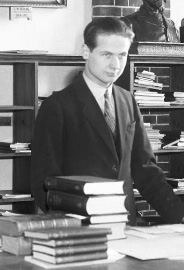
- Gunnar Jarring
- Date: 20 April 1973
- Meeting no.: 1,710
- Code: S/RES/331 (Document)
- Subject: The situation in the Middle East
- Voting summary: 15 voted for; None voted against; None abstained
- Result: Adopted

Security Council composition
- Permanent members: China; France; Soviet Union; United Kingdom; United States
- Non-permanent members: Australia; Austria; Guinea; India; Indonesia; Kenya; Panama; Peru; Sudan; Yugoslavia

United Nations Security Council Resolution 331, adopted on April 20, 1973, requested the Secretary-General to submit a report to the Council detailing the efforts undertaken by the UN pertaining to the Middle East since June 1967 and decided to meet following the submission of the report to examine the situation. The Council also requested the Secretary-General invite Mr. Gunnar Jarring, the Special Representative of the Secretary-General, to be available during the meeting in order to render assistance to the course of the deliberations.

The President of the Council stated that in the absence of any objections, the resolution was adopted unanimously.

== See also ==
- List of United Nations Security Council Resolutions 301 to 400 (1971–1976)
