= List of ambassadors of Sweden to Sri Lanka =

Ambassador of Sweden to Sri Lanka
- Lesser coat of arms of the Kingdom of Sweden
- Incumbent; Petra Menander since 2026
- Ministry for Foreign Affairs; Swedish Embassy, Colombo
- Style: His or Her Excellency (formal); Mr. or Madam Ambassador (informal)
- Reports to: Minister for Foreign Affairs
- Residence: 4-5 Nyaya Marg, Chanakyapuri (Note: The Swedish ambassador to Sri Lanka is accredited from the Swedish embassy in New Delhi, India.)
- Seat: New Delhi, India
- Appointer: Government of Sweden
- Term length: No fixed term
- Inaugural holder: Gunnar Jarring
- Formation: 1950

The Ambassador of Sweden to Sri Lanka (known formally as the Ambassador of the Kingdom of Sweden to the Democratic Socialist Republic of Sri Lanka) is the official representative of the government of Sweden to the president of Sri Lanka and government of Sri Lanka.

== History ==
Sweden and Sri Lanka established diplomatic relations on 18 November 1949. In March 1950, Sweden's envoy to New Delhi, India was also accredited to Colombo, the capital of Sri Lanka.

In November 1961, the Swedish and Sri Lankan governments agreed to elevate Sweden's legation to an embassy. Sweden's diplomatic representative to Sri Lanka was thereafter granted the diplomatic rank of ambassador, replacing the previous title of envoy extraordinary and minister plenipotentiary.

The Swedish embassy in Colombo opened in 1980. In January of that year, the embassy office was replaced by a diplomatic mission headed by a chargé d'affaires ad interim. The ambassador remained based in New Delhi.

In 1981, it was planned that, when the incumbent head of the embassy in Colombo's appointment expired, the position would be reorganised and combined with that of head of the aid office.

The integration of embassies and aid offices began in Colombo in late 1993. At other embassies primarily focused on development cooperation, operations were also headed by a chargé d'affaires ad interim. Examples included Colombo, Vientiane and Windhoek.

Of Sweden's six other programme countries, it maintained a field presence in four: Guinea-Bissau, Laos, Lesotho and Sri Lanka. Cape Verde and Uganda were the only countries without a field presence. In Sri Lanka, the field representation was organised as a diplomatic mission comprising an embassy office and an aid office. The head of the aid office served as chargé d'affaires ad interim and headed the entire Swedish mission abroad, which reported to the embassy in New Delhi.

The decision to close the embassy was taken in the summer of 2009. The Swedish embassy closed on 4 March 2010. As before, the ambassador based in New Delhi remained accredited to Sri Lanka.

== List of representatives ==
Name	Period	Resident / Non-resident	Title	Resident / Concurrent accreditation	Notes	Presented credentials	Ref
Dominion of Ceylon (1948–1972)
Gunnar Jarring	March 1950 – 1951	Non-resident	Envoy	Resident in New Delhi			
Per Wijkman	1951–1955	Non-resident	Envoy	Resident in New Delhi		February 1952	
Alva Myrdal	21 May 1956 – 1 April 1961 (Note: Alva Myrdal was accredited from the Swedish legation in New Delhi, which was upgraded to an embassy in 1956. Myrdal thus became ambassador to India from 27 October 1956. However, she remained with the title of envoy in Sri Lanka.)	Non-resident	Envoy	Resident in New Delhi			
Klas Böök	1961–1965	Non-resident	Ambassador	Resident in New Delhi		January 1962	
Gunnar Heckscher	1965–1970	Non-resident	Ambassador	Resident in New Delhi			
Axel Lewenhaupt	1970–1972	Non-resident	Ambassador	Resident in New Delhi			
Democratic Socialist Republic of Sri Lanka (1972–present)
Axel Lewenhaupt	1972–1975	Non-resident	Ambassador	Resident in New Delhi			
Lennart Finnmark	1975–1983	Non-resident	Ambassador	Resident in New Delhi			
Carl-Gustav Åkesson	1979–1982	Resident	Chargé d'affaires ad interim (Note: He held the following diplomatic rank: embassy counsellor.)				
Jarl Tranaeus	1982–1986	Resident	Chargé d'affaires ad interim (Note: Tranaeus was chargé d'affaires ad interim with the diplomatic rank of counsellor. He was also head of the aid office from 1981.)				
Axel Edelstam	1983–1987	Non-resident	Ambassador	Resident in New Delhi			
Olof Milton	1986–1989	Resident	Chargé d'affaires		Head of aid office and embassy counsellor		
Örjan Berner	1987–1989	Non-resident	Ambassador	Resident in New Delhi			
Pär Kettis	1989–1994	Non-resident	Ambassador	Resident in New Delhi			
Maj-Britt Amer	1989–1991	Resident	Embassy counsellor and chargé d'affaires?		Head of aid office and embassy counsellor		
Anders Trydell	1992–1995	Resident	Chargé d'affaires ad interim (Note: Trydell was chargé d'affaires ad interim with the diplomatic rank of counsellor. He was also the head of the aid office.)				
Karl-Göran Engström	1994–2000	Non-resident	Ambassador	Resident in New Delhi		22 September 1994	
Torvald Åkesson	1995–1999	Resident	Chargé d'affaires ad interim				
Börje Mattsson	1999–2001	Resident	Chargé d'affaires ad interim				
Johan Nordenfelt	2000–2004	Non-resident	Ambassador	Resident in New Delhi			
Ann Marie Fallenius	2001–2005	Resident	Chargé d'affaires ad interim				
Inga Eriksson Fogh	2004–2006	Non-resident	Ambassador	Resident in New Delhi			
Jerker Thunberg	2005–2006	Resident	Chargé d'affaires ad interim (Note: He held the following diplomatic rank: minister.)				
Lars-Olof Lindgren	2007–2012	Non-resident	Ambassador	Resident in New Delhi			
Börje Mattsson	March 2007 – 2010	Resident	Chargé d'affaires ad interim				
Harald Sandberg	2012–2017	Non-resident	Ambassador	Resident in New Delhi			
Klas Molin	2018–2022	Non-resident	Ambassador	Resident in New Delhi		25 May 2018	
Jan Thesleff	2022–2026	Non-resident	Ambassador	Resident in New Delhi		2 February 2023	
Petra Menander	2026–present	Non-resident	Ambassador	Resident in New Delhi			
