= Johan Cedercrantz =

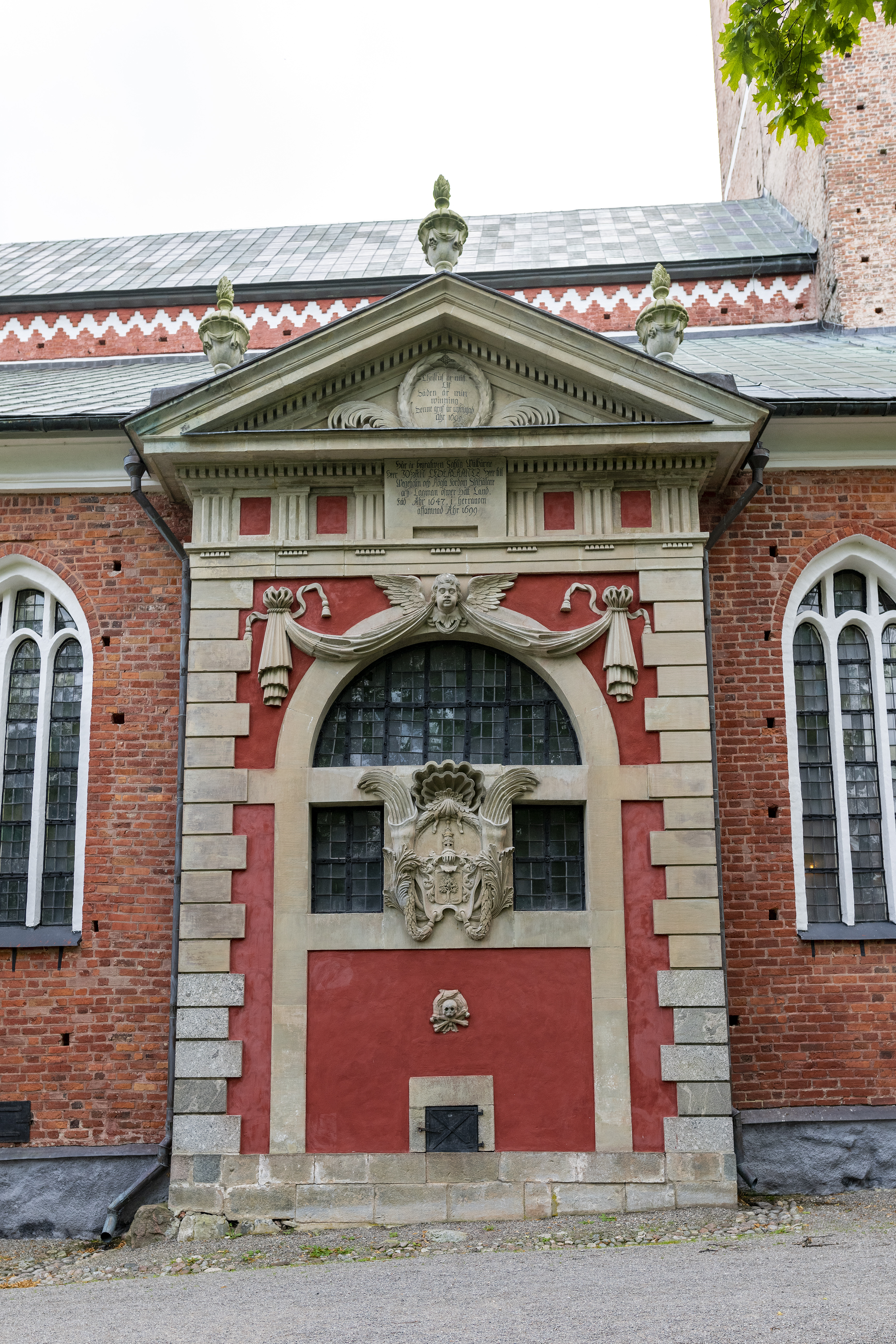
Cedercrantz grave cross facade, Strängnäs Cathedral

Johan Cedercrantz (originally Malmenius) (23 July 1646 – 23 December 1699) was a Swedish nobleman and official.

He was born in Strängnäs in 1646. Cedercrantz's main business was located on Gotland, which then belonged to Queen Christina. He worked there in various positions from 1670 to 1676, after which the island was occupied by the Danes. For a short time he was then Christina's chief secretary in Rome and was employed in various diplomatic missions, returning in 1679 to Gotland, where he was governor. In 1690, Cedercrantz became lawspeaker of Gotlands lagsaga, which at the time also included Öland.

He was knighted on 9 February 1678.

== Sources ==
- Svensk uppslagsbok, Lund 1930.

Preceded by Niels Juel	Governor of Gotland County; 1678–1689	Succeeded by Gustaf Adolf von der Osten
