= Dick Hichens-Bergström =

Swedish diplomat (1913–1989)

- Born: Per Richard Hichens-Bergström; 13 August 1913; Stockholm, Sweden
- Died: 9 May 1989 (aged 75); Nice, France
- Education: Uppsala University
- Occupation: Diplomat
- Years active: 1938–1979
- Spouses: Ingrid Bredenberg (m. 1940; div. 1961) Marianne Höök (m. 1961; died 1970) Ann Angell-Sandnes (m. 1972)
- Children: 2

Per Richard "Dick" Hichens-Bergström (13 August 1913 – 9 May 1989) was a Swedish diplomat was a Swedish diplomat with a long career in international service. After earning a law degree from Uppsala University in 1937, he began his career in the Ministry for Foreign Affairs as an attaché, serving in San Francisco and Washington, D.C., where he later became legation secretary. He also undertook a special assignment for the Swedish Central Bank during World War II.

He advanced through the ministry, becoming second secretary in 1944 and first secretary in 1946, with postings in Paris, Bern, and Moscow. During this period, he participated in aviation negotiations with the Soviet Union, represented Sweden at the United Nations General Assembly, and undertook various missions in Geneva. He also lectured at the Swedish National Defence College and acted as adviser at Nordic Foreign Ministers Meetings.

Hichens-Bergström held senior positions at the Foreign Ministry, including director (1953–1956) and deputy head of the political department (1956–1959). He served as ambassador to Iran, Iraq, and Afghanistan (1959–1963), head of the political department at the Foreign Ministry (1964–1967), and later as ambassador to Norway (1968–1973) and Italy and Malta (1973–1979). He chaired the Swedish delegation at the Conference on Security and Co-operation in Europe and served as Sweden’s permanent representative to the FAO, while also providing consultancy for Swedish industry.

== Early life and family ==
Hichens-Bergström was born on 13 August 1913 in Stockholm, Sweden, the son of the high councillor Richard Bergström and his wife Jenny (née Glimstedt). He was the brother of the opera singer Margareta Bergström-Kärde. His grandfather was the folklorist Richard Bergström, and grandfather was court justice Peter Olof Glimstedt. Per Glimstedt was his uncle.

Hichens-Bergström received a Candidate of Law degree from Uppsala University in 1937.

== Career ==
Hichens-Bergström completed his clerkship at Södersysslets Judicial District (Södersysslets domsaga) from 1937 to 1938. In 1938, he joined the Ministry for Foreign Affairs as an attaché, serving in San Francisco in 1939 and Washington, D.C., in 1940, where he later became legation secretary in 1943. Between 1941 and 1943, he also undertook a special assignment for the Swedish Central Bank in Washington, D.C.

In 1944, Hichens-Bergström was appointed second secretary at the Foreign Ministry and promoted to first secretary in 1946. He served as first embassy secretary in Paris in 1948, Bern in 1949, and Moscow in 1951, acting as embassy counsellor there in 1952. During this period, he represented Sweden in aviation negotiations with the Soviet Union and other countries from 1945 to 1947, served as secretary of the Swedish delegation at the United Nations General Assembly in 1947 and 1948, and worked with the Committee on Foreign Affairs in 1948. He also carried out various missions in Geneva in 1950, 1951, and 1954–1958, and acted as secretary and adviser at the Nordic Foreign Ministers Meetings from 1953 to 1956. Between 1953 and 1959, he lectured at the Swedish National Defence College.

Hichens-Bergström became director at the Foreign Ministry from 1953 to 1956 and deputy head of the political department from 1956 to 1959. He was ambassador in Tehran and Baghdad from 1959 to 1963 and in Kabul from 1960 to 1963. He returned to the Ministry as head of the political department from 1964 to 1967, during which he represented Sweden at the United Nations General Assembly, served as an adviser in the 1965 defense investigation, and was a member of the Advisory Board on Disarmament Matters. He also resumed his role as secretary and adviser at the Nordic Foreign Ministers Meetings from 1964 to 1967.

Later, Hichens-Bergström served as ambassador in Oslo from 1968 to 1973, and in Rome and Valletta from 1973 to 1979. He chaired the Swedish delegation at the Conference on Security and Co-operation in Europe in Geneva from 1973 to 1974 and served as permanent representative to the Food and Agriculture Organization (FAO) from 1975 to 1979. In addition, he undertook several consulting assignments for Swedish industry.

== Personal life ==
He was married 1940–1961 to Ingrid Bredenberg (1914–2013). In 1961 he married the journalist Marianne Höök (1919–1970) and in 1972 he married Ann Angell-Sandnes. In his first marriage he had the children, Maud (born 1947) and the writer Richard (born 1948–2023).

At the time of his death he was living in Villeneuve-Loubet in southern France.

== Death ==
Hichens-Bergström died on 9 May 1989 in Nice, France. A memorial service was held on 29 May 1989 in Gustaf Adolf Church in Stockholm. On 5 June 1989, he was interred in the family grave at Norra begravningsplatsen in Solna Municipality.

== Awards ==
- (Sweden) Commander of the Order of the Polar Star (11 November 1966)
- (Sweden) Knight of the Order of the Polar Star (1957)
- (Norway) Commander with Star of the Order of St. Olav (1 July 1959)
- (Denmark) Commander of the Order of the Dannebrog
- Commander of the Order of the Lion of Finland
- (Iceland) Grand Knight's Cross of the Order of the Falcon (27 June 1957)
- (Iran) Commander Great Cross of the Order of Homayoun
- Commander of the Order of the Sun of Peru
- (Netherlands) Officer of the Order of Orange-Nassau
- (Greece) Member of the Order of the Phoenix

Diplomatic posts
Preceded by Ragnvald Bagge	Ambassador of Sweden to Iran; 1959–1963	Succeeded by Eyvind Bratt
Preceded by Ragnvald Bagge	Ambassador of Sweden to Iraq; 1959–1963	Succeeded by Bengt Odhner
Preceded by Rolf Sohlman	Ambassador of Sweden to Afghanistan; 1960–1963	Succeeded by Eyvind Bratt
Preceded by Rolf Edberg	Ambassador of Sweden to Norway; 1968–1973	Succeeded by Yngve Möller
Preceded by Brynolf Eng	Ambassador of Sweden to Italy; 1973–1979	Succeeded by Axel Lewenhaupt
Preceded by Brynolf Eng	Ambassador of Sweden to Malta; 1973–1979	Succeeded by Axel Lewenhaupt
Preceded by None	Permanent Representative of Sweden to the FAO; 1973–1979	Succeeded by Axel Lewenhaupt
