= Cedercrantz =

Swedish noble family

Cedercrantz coat of arms

Cedercrantz is a Swedish noble family, with a common origin with the dynasty Söderhielm.

The family descends from Johan Malmenius (1646–1699), who in 1678 was knighted with the name Cedercrantz. His grandson, governor Johan Vilhelm Cedercrantz (born 1739, died 1805), who died childless and was the last in the family's male line, knighted and adopted his stepson Erik Bernhard Agrell (the son of a merchant from Halmstad, born in 1785, titular major in 1816, died 1850) in 1803. One of his grandsons was Conrad Cedercrantz.

== Sources ==
- Cedercrantz in Nordisk familjebok (1923)
