= Sjöcrona =

Swedish noble family

Arms of Sjöcrona

Sjöcrona, also spelled Siöcrona, is a Swedish noble family, of which only the head, according to the 1809 Instrument of Government, holds noble status.

The family's ancestor Torbjörn Eriksson lived during the late 17th century in Landskrona, Skåne, where he was a shopkeeper, and where his son Severin was born in 1700 and died in 1766. Anrep states that father and son called themselves Cronsjoe. Severin Torbjörnsson had a son, Ludvig Cronsjoe (1726-97), who received the title of assessor. The latter had with his second wife, Ulrika Bush, a niece of Lars Gathenhielm, a son named Cornelius Alexander Cronsjoe (1767-1824) who became lantråd and who in 1819 was knighted according to § 37 of the Constitution 1809, whereby the nobility only went to the head of the family. The following year, the family was introduced to the House of Nobility with number 2273. At the nobility, the noble family took the name Sjöcrona.

== Members of the family ==
- Aron Siöcrona (1825-1898), military and politician
- Cornelius Alexander Cronsjoe, nobleman Sjöcrona (1767-1824), lawyer, landowner and land councilor
- Cornelius Sjöcrona (1835-1917), lawyer, civil servant and politician
- Joachim Siöcrona (born 1943), librarian, publisher, author and translator
- Vera Siöcrona (1914-2003), author and journalist
