= Eric Gyllenstierna =

Swedish diplomat (1882–1940)

Baron Eric Gyllenstierna
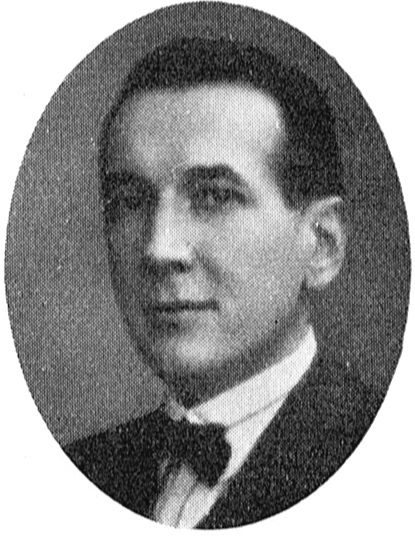
- Born: Eric Gyllenstierna af Lundholm; 27 March 1882; Höganäs, Sweden
- Died: 26 June 1940 (aged 58); Höganäs, Sweden
- Education: Lund University
- Occupation: Diplomat
- Years active: 1913–1967
- Spouse(s): Wanda Henriksson (m. 1910; died 1917) Lovise Marie Henriette Crespy (m. 1921; div. 1925) Signe Fineman (m. 1925; div. 1937) Dorothy Griffin (m. 1937–1939)
- Children: 1
- Relatives: Brynolf Eng (son-in-law)

Baron Eric Gyllenstierna af Lundholm (27 March 1882 – 26 June 1940) was a Swedish diplomat. Gyllenstierna began his career in the Swedish judiciary, serving in various district courts from 1910 to 1912 before moving into government service. He worked at the Ministry for Civil Service Affairs, the Parliamentary Ombudsman's office, and on committees addressing agricultural policy and national defence propaganda. In 1917–1918, he held senior roles in the Ministries for Naval and Foreign Affairs.

His diplomatic career started in 1919, with postings as first legation secretary in Helsinki and Paris, later becoming legation counsellor in Paris, London, and at the Swedish Foreign Ministry's Commercial Policy Department. From 1930, he served as Sweden's envoy to multiple capitals: Moscow (1930–1937), Tehran (1930–1936), and Baghdad (1934–1936). In 1938, he became envoy to Ankara and Athens, retiring from active service in 1939.

== Early life ==
Gyllenstierna was born on 27 March 1882 at Krapperup Castle in Höganäs Municipality, Sweden, the son of landowner, Friherre Nils Gyllenstierna and his wife Ellen (née Stiernstedt). He had two brothers and a sister; Carl (born 1883), Ebba Eleonora (1885–1934), and Gustaf (born 1891). He passed mogenhetsexamen in 1900 and received a Juris utriusque candidate degree from Lund University on 15 December 1909.

== Career ==
Gyllenstierna served in the judge's office in Luggude Judicial District and Medelstad Judicial District from 1910 to 1912. Gyllenstierna held district court and judge appointments in Medelstad in 1912. In 1914, Gyllenstierna was appointed amanuensis at the Ministry for Civil Service Affairs and as notary in the Committee on Agriculture from 1913 to 1915. On 2 June 1915, he became secretary at the Parliamentary Ombudsman's office. Gyllenstierna was a member and secretary of experts in the Committee Against Opposition to National Defence Propaganda (Kommittén mot försvarsfientlig propaganda) in 1917. He served as acting deputy director (kansliråd) at the Ministry for Naval Affairs from 31 December 1917, and as acting deputy head of department at the Ministry for Foreign Affairs beginning 29 October 1918.

He was appointed first legation secretary in Helsinki on 12 September 1919, and shortly thereafter, on 26 September the same year, acting first legation secretary in Paris. On 16 December 1921, he was appointed legation counsellor there. On 23 August 1922, he became legation counsellor and head of the Third Bureau of the Commercial Policy Department at the Foreign Ministry, a position he held from 1 September 1922 until 1927. Gyllenstierna became legation counsellor in London on 11 February 1927.

On 6 August 1930, he was appointed envoy to Moscow, a post he assumed on 1 October that year and held until 1937. He served as envoy to Tehran from 5 September 1930 to 1936, and to Baghdad from 18 May 1934 to 1936. On 30 December 1937, he was appointed envoy to Ankara and Athens, beginning his service there on 1 March 1938. He retired on 7 September 1939 and was appointed envoy extraordinary and minister plenipotentiary in inactive status.

== Personal life ==
Gyllenstierna was married four times.

He first married on 21 December 1910 in Oscar Fredrik Parish, Gothenburg, to Wanda Charlotte Henriette Henriksson, in her second marriage (previously married to sea captain Tage Johan Bertil Follin, from whom she was divorced, in his first marriage; born 24 December 1870). Wanda was born on 5 January 1881 in Malmö and died on 9 December 1917 at Sophiahemmet, Stockholm.

His second marriage took place on 22 February 1921 (sometimes given as 1922) to Lovise Marie Henriette Crespy, from whom he was divorced by a ruling of the Stockholm City Court on 25 June 1925. She was born on 8 May 1894.

His third marriage was on 29 August 1925 at Ribbingsfors (registered in Stockholm, Skeppsholm Parish) to Signe Maria Fineman, from whom he was divorced by a ruling of the Stockholm City Court on 13 July 1937. She was born on 7 January 1898 in Stockholm, the daughter of Dr. Gottfrid Fineman and Ebba af Geijerstam.

His fourth marriage took place on 31 August 1937 in Maria Parish, Helsingborg, to Mrs. Dorothy Mary Griffin of London, in her second marriage (previously married to Captain William Charles Love, from whom she was divorced on 23 September 1933; born 3 September 1892 in Streatham, London). Dorothy was born on 2 April 1895 in Wanstead, London, the daughter of Rose and Charles Griffin.

Gyllenstierna had one daughter, Wanda Ellen Beata (born 30 November 1917 in Stockholm), who married diplomat Brynolf Eng in 1938. They later divorced.

After his father's death, Gyllenstierna inherited the entailed estates of Krapperup and Bjersgård, both in Scania.

== Death ==
Gyllenstierna died on 26 June 1940 at Krapperup Castle in Höganäs Municipality, Sweden. The funeral service took Place on 29 June 1940 at Brunnby Church, Höganäs Municipality. He was interred the same day at Brunnby Cemetery.

== Awards and decorations ==
- (Sweden) Commander 1st Class of the Order of the Polar Star (6 June 1932)
- (Sweden) Knight of the Order of the Polar Star (25 November 1922)
- (Iraq) 1st Class of the Order of the Two Rivers
- (Iran) 1st Class of the Order of Homayoun
- (Belgium) Commander of the Order of Leopold (1927)
- (Poland) Commander of the Order of Polonia Restituta (1926)
- (France) Officer of the Legion of Honour (1921)

Diplomatic posts
| Preceded by Carl von Heidenstam | Envoy of Sweden to the Soviet Union; 1930–1937 | Succeeded by Wilhelm Winther |
| Preceded by Carl von Heidenstam | Envoy of Sweden to Iran; 1930–1936 | Succeeded by Wilhelm Winther |
| Preceded by Carl von Heidenstam | Envoy of Sweden to Iraq; 1934–1936 | Succeeded by Wilhelm Winther |
| Preceded by Wilhelm Winther | Envoy of Sweden to Turkey; 1937–1939 | Succeeded by Einar Modig |
| Preceded by Wilhelm Winther | Envoy of Sweden to Greece; 1937–1939 | Succeeded by Einar Modig |
