= List of ambassadors of Sweden to Iran =

Ambassador of Sweden to Iran
- Lesser coat of arms of the Kingdom of Sweden
- Incumbent; Mathias Otterstedt since January 2025
- Ministry for Foreign Affairs; Swedish Embassy, Tehran
- Style: His or Her Excellency (formal); Mr. or Madam Ambassador (informal)
- Reports to: Minister for Foreign Affairs
- Seat: Tehran, Iran
- Appointer: Government of Sweden
- Term length: No fixed term
- Inaugural holder: Carl von Heidenstam
- Formation: 26 March 1929
- Website: Swedish Embassy, Tehran

The Ambassador of Sweden to Iran (known formally as the Ambassador of the Kingdom of Sweden to the Islamic Republic of Iran) is the official representative of the government of Sweden to the president of Iran and government of Iran.

== History ==
Sweden's first envoy accredited in Tehran was Sweden's envoy in Moscow, Carl von Heidenstam, who was appointed on 26 March 1929. The King in Council appointed von Heidenstam, as it had become desirable—partly due to the development of Swedish-Persian trade relations—to establish direct diplomatic relations with Persia. He presented his letter of credence to the Shah of Persia, Reza Shah on 24 April of the same year.

The engineer Hugo von Heidenstam was appointed in 1936 as Sweden's first resident minister in Tehran. He was also the first Swedish minister in Tehran to be accredited to Baghdad, Iraq. Previously, the Swedish minister in Moscow was accredited in Baghdad. von Heidenstam presented his credentials in Baghdad on 9 December 1936.

In July 1949, the King in Council decided to establish diplomatic relations with Pakistan. The then Minister in Tehran and Baghdad, Envoy Harry Eriksson, was appointed to also serve as the envoy in Karachi.

In September 1957, an agreement was reached between the Swedish and Iranian governments on the mutual elevation of the respective countries' legations to embassies. The diplomatic rank was thereafter changed to ambassador instead of envoy extraordinary and minister plenipotentiary.

In August 1960, after an agreement was reached between the Swedish and Afghan governments that the heads of missions in their respective countries would hold the rank of ambassador, Sweden's then-ambassador to Tehran and Baghdad, Dick Hichens-Bergström, was also appointed as ambassador to Kabul.

== List of representatives ==
Name	Period	Title	Resident / Concurrent accreditation	Notes	Presented credentials	Ref
Imperial State of Persia (1925–1935)
Carl von Heidenstam	26 March 1929 – 1930	Envoy	Resident in Moscow			
Eric Gyllenstierna	5 September 1930 – 1935	Envoy	Resident in Moscow			
Imperial State of Iran (1935–1979)
Eric Gyllenstierna	1935–1936	Envoy	Resident in Moscow			
Gunnar Reuterskiöld	1934–1936	Chargé d'affaires ad interim				
Hugo von Heidenstam	1 June 1936 – 1 August 1942	Envoy	Also accredited to Baghdad			
Olof Ripa	1941–1941	Chargé d'affaires ad interim				
Harald Pousette	1941–1945	Chargé d'affaires ad interim	Also accredited to Baghdad			
Gunnar Jarring	1945–1945	Chargé d'affaires ad interim	Also accredited to Baghdad			
Harald Pousette	1945–1947	Envoy	Also accredited to Baghdad			
Harry Eriksson	1948–1951	Envoy	Also accredited to Baghdad and Karachi (from 1949)			
Gunnar Jarring	1951–1952	Envoy	Also accredited to Baghdad and Karachi			
Ragnvald Bagge	1953–1957	Envoy	Also accredited to Baghdad and Karachi (until 1956)			
Ragnvald Bagge	1957–1959	Ambassador	Also accredited to Baghdad			
Dick Hichens-Bergström	1959–1963	Ambassador	Also accredited to Baghdad and Kabul (from 1960)			
Eyvind Bratt	1964–1967	Ambassador	Also accredited to Kabul			
Nils-Eric Ekblad	1967–1970	Ambassador	Also accredited to Kabul			
Gustaf Bonde	1970–1973	Ambassador	Also accredited to Kabul			
Bengt Odhner	1973–1978	Ambassador	Also accredited to Kabul			
Kaj Sundberg	1978–1989	Ambassador	Also accredited to Kabul			
Islamic Republic of Iran (1979–present)
Kaj Sundberg	1979–1980	Ambassador	Also accredited to Kabul			
Göran Bundy	1980–1985	Ambassador			April 1980	
Bo Henrikson	1985–1988	Ambassador				
Håkan Granqvist	1989–1994	Ambassador				
Hans Andersson	1992–1997	Ambassador				
Mats Marling	1997–2000	Ambassador				
Steen Hohwü-Christensen	2000–2003	Ambassador				
Christofer Gyllenstierna	2003–2007	Ambassador				
Magnus Wernstedt	2008–2012	Ambassador				
Peter Tejler	2012–2016	Ambassador				
Helena Sångeland	September 2016 – 2019	Ambassador				
Mattias Lentz	1 September 2019 – August 2023	Ambassador			19 November 2019	
Lars Ronnås	August 2023 – March 2024	Chargé d'affaires ad interim				
Jöran Bjällerstedt	March 2024 – August 2024	Chargé d'affaires ad interim				
Eric Salmgren von Schantz	September 2024 – 2025	Chargé d'affaires ad interim				
Mathias Otterstedt	January 2025 – present	Ambassador		Appointed in June 2023. Took office in January 2025. (Note: On Iranian state television on 20 July 2023, Iran's Foreign Minister Hossein Amir-Abdollahian stated: 'The Swedish ambassador's term in Tehran has ended, and under the president's orders, we will not accept a new Swedish ambassador until the Swedish government takes strong action against the desecration of the Holy Quran. Otterstedt presented his crendentials to Foreign Minister Abbas Araghchi on 27 January 2025, thus beginning his term as ambassador.)	27 January 2025	

== See also ==
- Iran–Sweden relations
- Embassy of Sweden, Tehran
