= Order of Homayoun =

- Original version of the First Class of the Order of Homayoun

Awarded by Pahlavi dynasty
- Type: State order
- Established: 1939
- Country: Imperial State of Iran
- Ribbon
- Status: Defunct
- Founder: Reza Shah
- Grand Master: Mohammad Reza Shah

Statistics
- Last induction: 1970
- Ribbon

The Order of Homayoun (Persian: نشان همایون) was one of the orders of honor of Iran during the Pahlavi era. It replaced the Order of the Lion and the Sun following the accession of Reza Shah Pahlavi in 1925 and the fall of the Qajar dynasty. The order was redesigned in 1939, when its distinctive enamelwork was introduced, and remained in use until 1979. Following the Iranian Revolution of 1979, the order and the regulations governing its award were abolished.

== History ==
The order was originally established in 1925 under the name "Reward for Service" (Be Padash-e Khedmat). It consisted of three classes and was produced in two metals. The obverse featured a depiction of the Lion and Sun at its center, surrounded by two olive branches. The reverse bore the title of Reza Shah within a circular inscription reading "Pahlavi, Shahanshah of Iran," together with the phrase "Reward for Service" at the top and the date 25 Azar 1304 (16 December 1925) at the bottom.

The First Class badge was made of silver gilt, the Second Class of silver, and the Third Class of bronze. All three were manufactured in France. All three classes were breast badges of the same size and were suspended from a plain green ribbon. Because the reverse bore the inscription "Reward for Service", and due to the later star-shaped redesign introduced fourteen years afterward, this original decoration has sometimes been mistakenly referred to as the "Reza Shah Service Order". In 1939, the Order of Homayoun was introduced in its new and now well-known design.

== Design ==
The Order of Homayoun was a star-shaped decoration struck in 800-fineness silver. At its center was a circular medallion featuring a hand-painted enameled depiction of the Lion and Sun. The order was designed and manufactured by the Parisian medal-making company Arthus-Bertrand on commission from the Pahlavi court. Its ribbon was green with red edges.

The order comprised four classes: First Class – awarded in three forms: a breast star, a neck badge, and a sash badge. Second Class – awarded in two forms: a breast badge and a neck badge. Third Class – awarded as either a breast badge or a neck badge. Fourth Class – a military decoration worn as a breast badge.

Classes of the Order of Homayoun
Class	Form / Method of Wear	Size	Number of Rays	Remarks	Ribbon
First Class	Breast star	95.8 mm	Eight	Rays decorated with enamel	None
First Class	Sash badge	54 mm	Four		Green with red edges
Second Class	Breast star	97 mm	Eight	Rays without enamel	None
Second Class	Neck badge	67.5 mm	Six		Green with red edges
Third Class	Breast badge	59.5 mm	Four		Green with red edges
Third Class	Neck badge		Four		Green with red edges
Fourth Class	Breast badge	19.18 mm	Four		Green

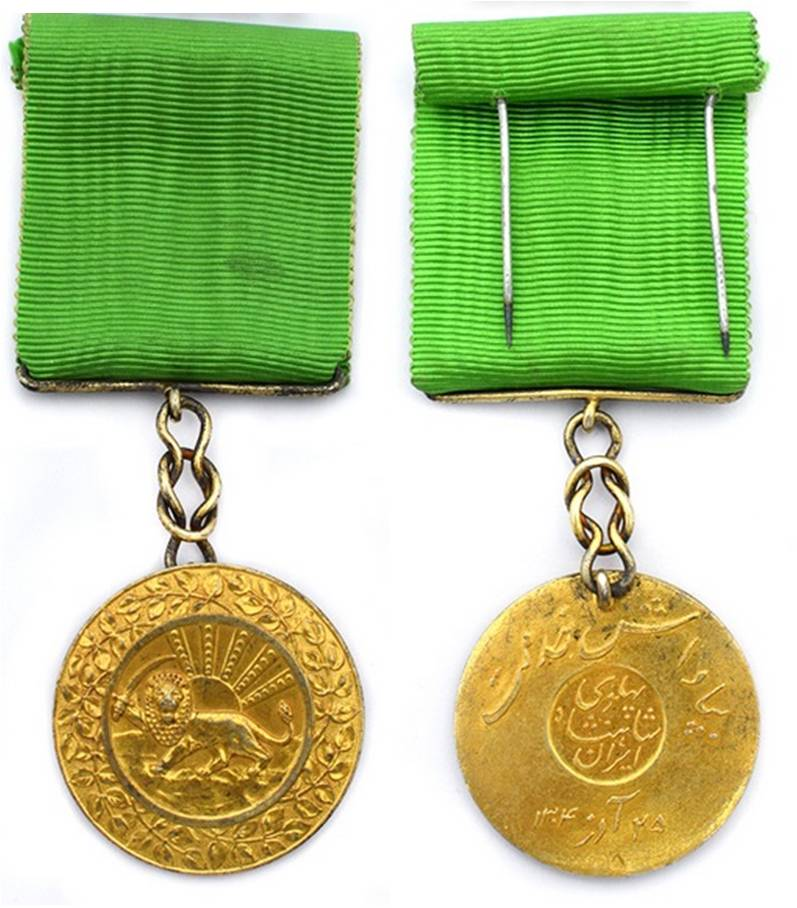
First Class Order of Homayoun as originally instituted (1925)

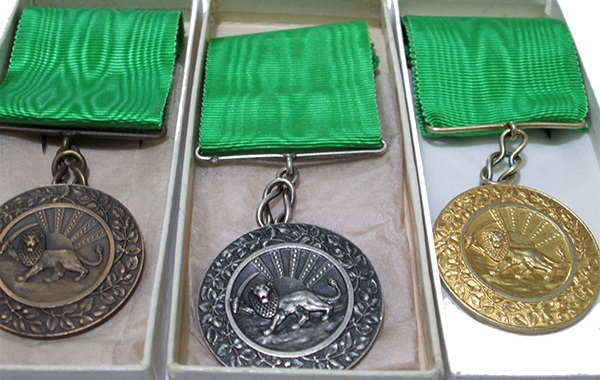
The three classes of the original Order of Homayoun ("Reward for Service")

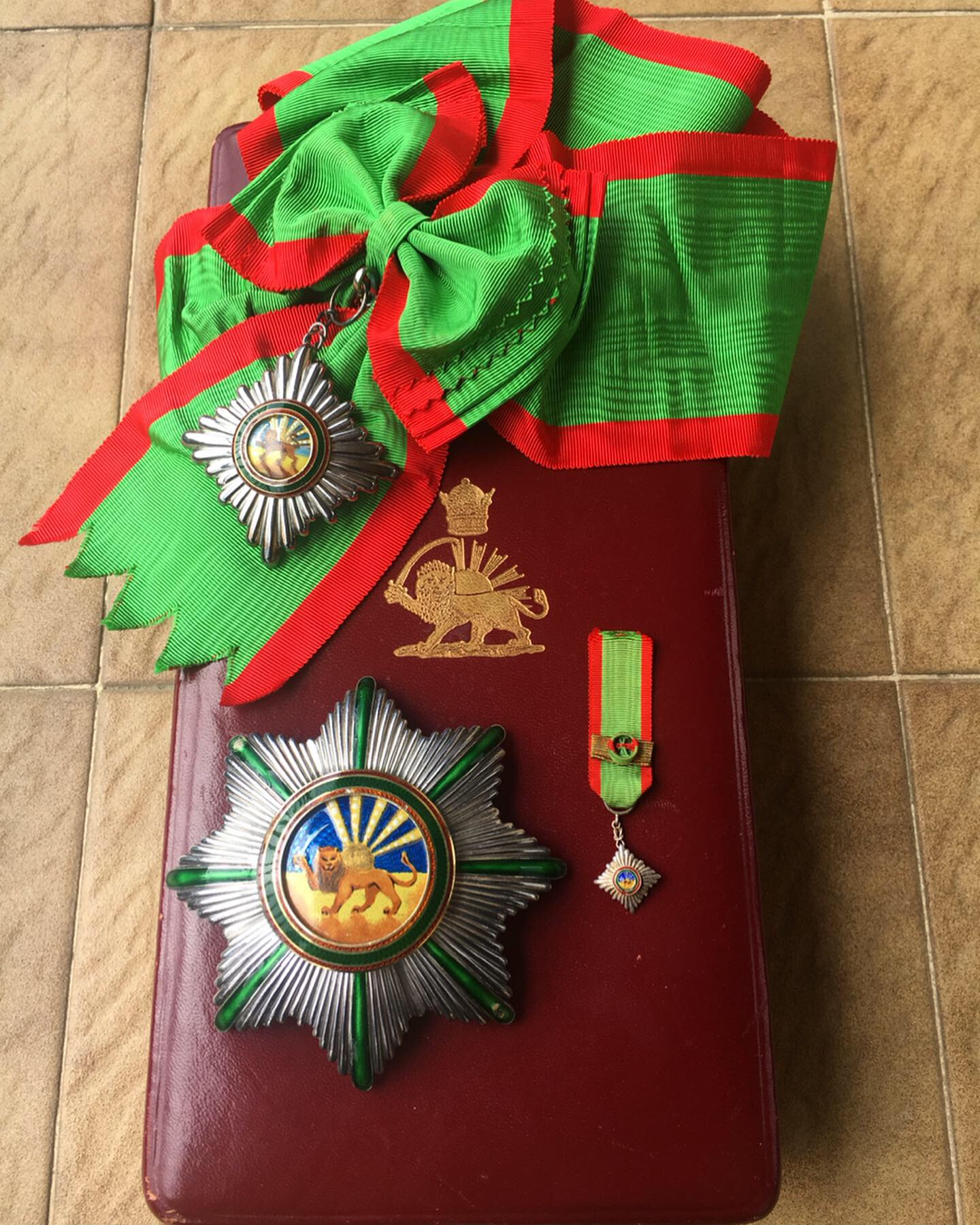
First Class insignia set of the Order of Homayoun, comprising the breast star, sash badge, and knight's badge (miniature pendant)

== Notable recipients ==
Notable recipients
Name	Year	Rank	Reason awarded
Brigadier General Frank Schaffer Besson Jr.	1944	Second Class	Service to Shah of Iran and provision of health care to population as Director of the Third Military Railway Service in Iran from 1944 to 1945. The Shah personally presented him with the medal.
