= Sweden v. Yamaguchi =

Judicial decision in family law

Sweden v. Yamaguchi, otherwise known as in the matter of Marianne Wilson, or in the matter of Mary Ann Vaughn, is a highly complex decision in international family law which touches on questions in law still unresolved over fifty years later. The formal name of the action was Israel Karl-Gustav Eugene Lagerfelt v. Yamaguchi Masakatsu and Yamaguchi Hideko, or Case of Demand for Delivery of an Infant, No. Wa-154, 1956 Yokohama District Court (Yokohama Chiho-saiban-sho), initiated February 22, 1956. On December 5, 1956, it held that the defendants should deliver the infant to the plaintiff. The appeal was dismissed by Tokyo High Court (No. Ne-2824) on July 9, 1958.

== Case ==
The case was brought by Consul Baron Karl-Gustav Lagerfelt on behalf of the King of Sweden as petitioner for guardianship of Mary Ann Vaughn, the daughter of a Swedish national in Japan, against the Yamaguchi family, de facto custodians of the eight-year-old child, to answer the questions of custody, guardianship and citizenship of Mary Ann Vaughn, also known as Marianne Wilson.

The case was decided in Yokohama District Court in 1956, and sustained upon appeal by defendants to the Tokyo High Court in 1958. Defendants declined appeal to the Japanese Supreme Court, and custody was granted to the Swedish Crown. Mary Ann Vaughn, to be thenceforth known as Marianne Wilson, was granted Swedish citizenship and remained in the custody of the Swedish Ambassadors to Japan Tage Grönwall and later Karl Fredrik Almqvist in Tokyo.

== Parental history ==
Mary Ann Vaughn was born the only child of James A. Vaughn (b. May 7, 1925) and Vivienne Joy Wilson (b. November 2, 1929), in Bluff Hospital in Yokohama, Japan on April 17, 1949. Her father was a US national employed under contract with the United States Military Administration of Occupied Japan. Her mother was a Swedish National, of three generations of Swedish citizens resident in Japan. She was descended from John Wilson (Captain) and Sophia Wilson, née Naka Yamazaki (great-grandparents) through their youngest son Professor John Wilson (grandfather).

== Birth ==
Due to the sensitive nature of Vaughn's employment, the US Military Administration declined to allow Vaughn to marry under civil law at the US Embassy in Tokyo. Vaughn and Vivienne Wilson were married under religious ceremony in Yokohama, Japan on 8 May 1948.

The Department of State declined Vaughn's request to allow his wife to immigrate to the United States, due to the absence of a licit civil license. During this time, Japan was under US Law as Occupied Japan. In addition, Japan had traditionally ignored the marriages of foreigners. As foreigners had no licit koseki, or Japanese family record, there was no method for registration of foreigner marriages within Japan. As Vaughn was a civilian employee of the United States, his marriage did not come under the terms of permissible immigration stipulated for US Military Service Personnel who married foreign women (see War-bride). Due to the absence of recognized civil marriage, James and Vivienne allegedly suffered harassment by US and Japanese authorities.

Upon learning that his wife was pregnant, Vaughn returned to the United States to seek permission for immigration of his pregnant wife. He received assistance from Patrick McCarran, senator from Nevada, who sponsored private legislation permitting the immigration of Vivienne Joy Wilson to the United States for the purpose of legitimizing their marriage; and recognizing his daughter, Mary Ann Vaughn, who had been born in Yokohama during the interim, as his natural-born daughter. Private legislation was passed by the United States Congress and signed into law on 5 August 1950. (81st Congress 2nd Session, v.64 part 2, Chapter 596, Private Law 722, For the relief of Vivienne Joy Wilson and minor daughter Mary Ann Vaughn)

However, Vivienne had been weakened by the privations of World War II, and contracted tuberculosis during James Vaughn's absence, during which Mary Ann was cared for by a nanny, Fumi. She died on 5 August 1950, the very day of passage of private legislation permitting her to immigrate to the United States.

== Early life ==
After the death of her mother, Mary Ann Vaughn was placed under the guardianship of Professor John Wilson, with nanny Fumi Kaneko (later Fumi Yamaguchi) in custodial care. Due to the privations of the postwar period, John Wilson sailed to Sweden with his wife and children in 1952. Mary Ann was to accompany them, but due to an outbreak of whooping cough, she was to sail on the next ship. However, Yamaguchi absconded with Mary Ann, and Yamaguchi destroyed the child's records, raising her under claim of an abandoned American orphan in the slums of Yokohama.

John Wilson continued to search for Mary Ann, and with the intervention of the AJCAJAO (American Joint Committee for Assisting Japanese-American Orphans), the Red Cross of Sweden and the International Red Cross, found and identified her in Yokohama in 1955. The AJCAJAO identified her residency with Masakatsu Yamaguchi and wife in Yokohama. The Consul of the Royal Swedish Legation attempted to negotiate a custody settlement with the Yamaguchi family, but was unsuccessful. The Crown then brought suit on behalf of Wilson for custody.

According to Fumi Kaneko (reading from her interview in Asahi Shinbun and Shukan Shincho), the baby was entrusted to her by Vivian at her death bed. There was no mention of a search for the baby; instead Fumi Kaneko said she was the one who approached the Swedish Embassy to recognize Mary Ann before she entered into grade school.

== Public notoriety ==
The case developed intense national publicity in Japan, with a great national sympathy towards the Yamaguchi family, to remain as custodian, with publication in the Kanagawa Shimbun, Asahi Shimbun and Shukan Shincho Japanese periodicals, especially in the shukanshi, confrontational weekly magazines. The case attracted considerable attention from the Japanese Leftists, and became a focus of anti-American nationalism in Japan after World War II. The United States government abjured involvement in the case, not offering to enter as participant or amicus in the hearing.

== Subsequent history ==
Mary Ann, now known as Marianne Wilson, remained in the custody of the Swedish Ambassador to Japan, and attended the ASIJ, the American School in Japan in Chōfu, Tokyo ASIJ, graduating in the 1960s. She continued to visit the Yamaguchi family throughout their lifetime. She retained her Swedish citizenship, and relocated to Sweden, working for the Scandinavian Airlines System for a time, before returning to Japan to settle as a permanent resident Swedish citizen in Japan. She is married with one son, and lives in Tokyo. She remains in close contact with the John Wilson family of Sweden.

== See also ==
- Japanese law
