= Mary Ann Vaughn =

Mary Ann Vaughn (born April 17, 1949), a.k.a. Marianne Wilson, is a citizen of Sweden who was the subject of a widely publicised and highly controversial case in international family law decided in the Tokyo High Court in 1956, Sweden v. Yamaguchi. Vaughn became the ward of the Swedish Ambassador to Japan, Tage Grönwall and later Karl Fredrik Almqvist, and resided in the Swedish Embassy in Tokyo.

== Birth and ancestry ==
Vaughn was born the only child of James A. Vaughn (May 7, 1925- February 3, 2003) and Vivienne Joy Wilson (November 2, 1929 – August 5, 1950), in Bluff Hospital in Yokohama, Japan, on April 17, 1949.

Her father was a US citizen employed under contract with the United States Military Administration of Occupied Japan at the General Headquarters. He was descended from early settlers of the Massachusetts Bay Colony who founded Salem, Massachusetts, John Balch and John Wingate

Her mother was a Swedish national, of three generations of Swedish citizens resident in Japan. She was descended from John Wilson and Sophia Wilson, former Naka Yamazaki, her grandparents, and Professor John Wilson.

Vivienne Wilson had been weakened by the privations of World War II, and contracted tuberculosis during James Vaughn's absence to the United States, during which Mary Ann was cared for by a nanny, Fumi. Vivienne died on 5 August 1950, the very day of passage of private legislation permitting her to immigrate to the United States. She was buried in the Geijin Boche, the Foreign Cemetery overlooking the port in Yokohama, Japan.

== Early life ==
After the death of her mother, Vaughn was placed under the guardianship of Professor John Wilson, with nanny Fumi Kaneko (later Fumi Yamaguchi) in custodial care. Due to the privations of the postwar period, John Wilson sailed to Sweden with his wife and children in 1952. Vaughn was to accompany them, but due to an outbreak of whooping cough, she was to sail on the next ship. However, Yamaguchi absconded with Vaughn, and Yamaguchi destroyed the child's records, raising her under claim of an abandoned American orphan in the slums of Yokohama.

== Media ==
The story of Mary Ann Vaughn has been extensively covered by the popular press, and is of considerable interest to organizations such as the Japan Children's Rights Network (Non-Japanese Awarded Custody of a Child in Japan).
