= Klas Böök =

Swedish diplomat and public servant (1909–1980)

- Born: Klas Erik Böök; 10 March 1909; Lund, Sweden
- Died: 5 January 1980 (aged 70); Östra Karup, Sweden
- Education: Lund University; London School of Economics
- Occupation: Diplomat
- Years active: 1936–1975
- Spouse: Aina Hakon-Pettersson (m. 1933)
- Children: 5

Klas Erik Böök (10 March 1909 – 5 January 1980) was a Swedish diplomat and public servant who served as Governor of the Swedish National Bank from 1948 to 1951 and was Swedish ambassador in various countries between 1951 and 1972.

== Early life ==
Böök was born on 10 March 1909 in Lund, Sweden, the son of professor Fredrik Böök and his wife Tora (née Olsson). He received a Bachelor of Arts degree from Lund University in 1934 and studied at London School of Economics in 1935 and received a Licentiate of Philosophy degree from Lund University in 1936.

== Career ==
Böök became lieutenant at Wendes Artillery Regiment's (A 3) reserve in 1935 and was hired by the Swedish National Bank in 1936 where he became secretary in 1937. He was acting bank advisor and head of the Statistics Department in 1940. Böök was deputy director of the Foreign Exchange Control Office (Valutakontoret) in 1940, was a director there in 1947 and chairman from 1948 to 1951. He was a member of the National Export Credits Guarantee Board in 1943 and deputy chairman from 1947 to 1951. Böök was bank director and head of the II section (central bank issues) within the Swedish National Bank in 1943 and was governor of the bank from 1948 to 1951 (vice governor in 1944).

His diplomatic career began when he was appointed head of the Commercial Department of the Ministry for Foreign Affairs and envoy from 1947 to 1948. He was minister in Ottawa from 1951 to 1956, ambassador in Beijing from 1956 to 1961, also accredited as envoy to Bangkok from 1956 to 1959. Böök was ambassador in New Delhi, also accredited to Colombo and Kathmandu from 1961 to 1965 and in Bern from 1965 to 1972. He had special assignments for the Foreign Ministry from 1972 to 1975.

Böök was a member of the Trade Commission from 1944 to 1947 and was the deputy chairman from 1945 to 1947. He was a member of the National Reconstruction Board (Statens återuppbyggnadsnämnd) from 1944 to 1946 and the Foreign Capital Control Office Board (Flyktkapitalbyråns styrelse) from 1945 to 1951. Böök was also member of the board of an international bank in Basel from 1949 to 1951, the International Bank for Reconstruction and Development from 1951 to 1952, the International Monetary Fund in 1951 and the Postal Savings Bank Council (Postsparbanksfullmäktige) from 1949 to 1951. Böök was participant in the negotiations on trade and payment agreements.

== Personal life ==
In 1933, Böök married Aina Hakon-Pettersson (1911–1997), the daughter of engineer Erik Hakon-Pettersson and Julia (née Ekelund). He was the father Annika (married Eriksson), Ole, Kim, Susanne (married Francke) and Peter.

== Death ==
Böök died on 5 January 1980. He was buried on 9 May 1980 at Östra Karup Cemetery in Östra Karup.

== Awards ==
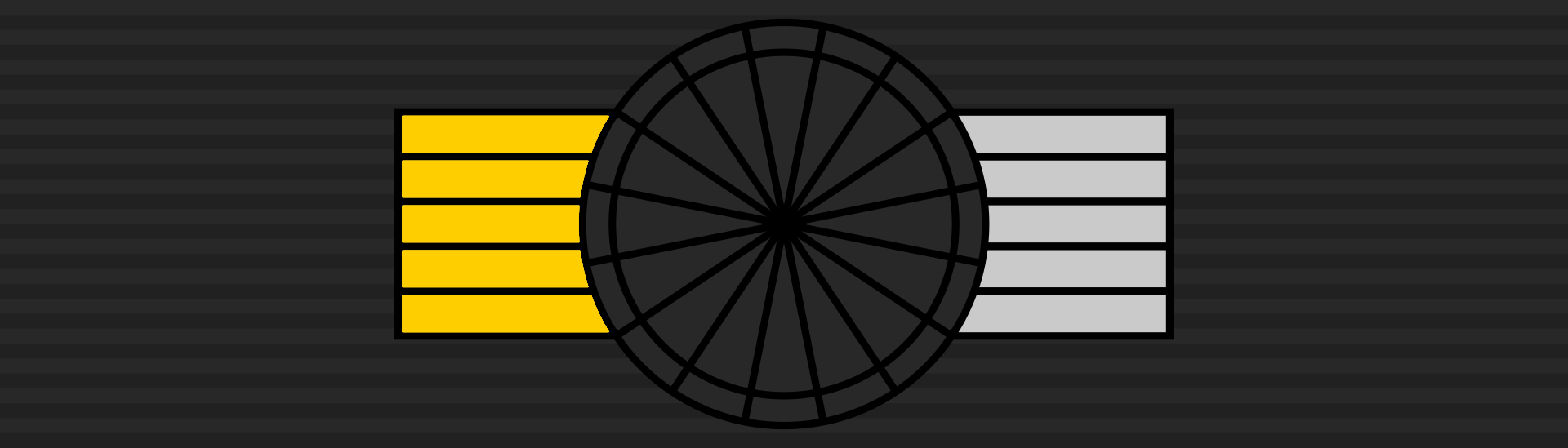
- (Sweden) Commander 1st Class of the Order of the Polar Star (6 June 1951)
- (Sweden) Commander of the Order of the Polar Star (5 June 1948)
- (Sweden) Knight of the Order of the Polar Star (1944)
- Commander of the Order of the White Rose of Finland
- (Denmark) Commander of the Order of the Dannebrog
- (Norway) Commander of the Order of St. Olav

== Bibliography ==
- Böök, Klas (1976). Handelsavtalet 1940 mellan Sverige och Sovjetunionen: förhandlingar och genomförande [The trade agreement in 1940 between Sweden and the Soviet Union: negotiations and implementation]. Aktstycken utgivna av Utrikesdepartementet. Ny serie II, 0562-8881; 31 (in Swedish). Stockholm: [LiberFörlag/Allmänna förl.(distr.)]. ISBN 91-38-03209-0.

Government offices
Preceded by Ivar Rooth	Governor of the Swedish National Bank; 1948–1951	Succeeded by Mats Lemne
Diplomatic posts
Preceded by Per Wijkman	Envoy of Sweden to Canada; 1951–1956	Succeeded by Oscar Thorsing
Preceded by Hugo Wistrand	Ambassador of Sweden to China; 1956–1961	Succeeded by Kjell Öberg
Preceded by Hugo Wistrand	Envoy of Sweden to Thailand; 1956–1959	Succeeded by Tord Hagen
Preceded by Alva Myrdal	Ambassador of Sweden to India; 1961–1965	Succeeded by Gunnar Heckscher
Preceded by Alva Myrdal	Ambassador of Sweden to Ceylon; 1961–1965	Succeeded by Gunnar Heckscher
Preceded by Alva Myrdal	Ambassador of Sweden to Nepal; 1961–1965	Succeeded by Gunnar Heckscher
Preceded by Fritz Stackelberg	Ambassador of Sweden to Switzerland; 1965–1972	Succeeded by Sven-Eric Nilsson
