= List of ambassadors of Sweden to China =

Ambassador of Sweden to China
- Lesser coat of arms of the Kingdom of Sweden
- Incumbent; Per Augustsson since August 2023
- Ministry for Foreign Affairs; Swedish Embassy, Beijing
- Style: His or Her Excellency (formal); Mr. or Madam Ambassador (informal)
- Reports to: Minister for Foreign Affairs
- Residence: 3 Dongzhimenwai Dajie (Note: The ambassador's residence is at the same location as the chancery.)
- Seat: Beijing, China
- Appointer: Government of Sweden
- Term length: No fixed term
- Inaugural holder: Gustaf Wallenberg
- Formation: 1907
- Website: Swedish Embassy, Beijing

The Ambassador of Sweden to China (known formally as the Ambassador of the Kingdom of Sweden to the People's Republic of China) is the official representative of the government of Sweden to the president of China and government of China. The ambassador has a dual accreditation to Ulaanbaatar (Mongolia).

== History ==
Sweden's first envoy accredited to China was the minister in Tokyo, Japan, Envoy Gustaf Wallenberg. In April 1907, Wallenberg was in Beijing to have the Treaty of Canton (1847) between Sweden–Norway and China amended and to establish diplomatic relations between Sweden and China.

During the 1920s and 1930s, legation counselors from the Swedish legation in Tokyo where based in Beijing and served as chargés d'affaires ad interim when the minister was absent. From 1933, the holder of the consul general position also served as the chargé d'affaires ad interim in the Republic of China.

The Committee of Supply report issued in March 1937 stated that the leadership of Sweden's diplomatic representation in China had been exercised by the minister stationed in Tokyo. In the minister's absence, the consul general in Shanghai served as chargé d'affaires ad interim. However, the minister for foreign affairs considered this provisional arrangement unsuitable given recent developments. Both the Swedish National Board of Trade and industry organizations supported the establishment of an independent diplomatic mission in China. It was therefore proposed that a new legation be created in China starting the next fiscal year, by upgrading the Consulate General in Shanghai to a full ministerial post (envoy). Initially, the new envoy would remain in Shanghai but could be relocated to Nanjing if deemed appropriate. It was also proposed that the envoy to China be accredited to Siam (Thailand), a responsibility then held by the envoy in Tokyo. Johan Beck-Friis became Sweden's first resident envoy to China on 1 July 1937.

In 1947, an agreement was reached between the Swedish and Nationalist governments on the mutual elevation of the respective countries' legations to embassies. The diplomatic rank was thereafter changed to ambassador instead of envoy extraordinary and minister plenipotentiary.

== List of representatives ==
Name	Period	Title	Resident / Concurrent accreditation	Notes	Presented credentials	Ref
Qing dynasty (–1912)
Gustaf Wallenberg	1907–1912	Envoy	Resident in Tokyo			
Republic of China (1912–1949)
Gustaf Wallenberg	1912–1918	Envoy	Resident in Tokyo			
David Bergström	7 May 1918 – 10 June 1920	Acting envoy	Resident in Tokyo			
Thore Fevrell	1918–1919	Chargé d'affaires ad interim (Note: Held the diplomatic rank of legation secretary.)	Also in Tokyo			
David Bergström	11 June 1920 – 27 October 1922	Envoy	Resident in Tokyo			
Oskar Ewerlöf	1923–1928	Envoy	Resident in Tokyo		8 November 1923	
Carl Leijonhufvud	27 June 1924 – 1930	Chargé d'affaires ad interim (Note: Held the diplomatic rank of legation counselor.)				
Johan Hultman	1929–1936	Envoy	Resident in Tokyo			
Joen Lagerberg	14 July 1930 – 1932	Chargé d'affaires ad interim				
Johan Beck-Friis	18 January 1936 – 30 June 1937	Chargé d'affaires ad interim		Consul General in Shanghai.		
Johan Beck-Friis	1 July 1937 – 1939	Envoy	Based in Shanghai			
Erik Kronvall	1939–1941	Chargé d'affaires ad interim	Based in Shanghai			
–	1940–1943	Envoy		Vacant		
Malte Pripp	1940–1946	Chargé d'affaires ad interim	Based in Shanghai			
Sven Allard	1943–1944	Acting envoy	Resident in Chongqing			
Sven Allard	1944 – August 1947	Envoy	Resident in Chongqing (1944–1945), Nanjing (1945–1946), and Shanghai (from 1947)			
Henrik Ramel	August 1947 – April 1948	Chargé d'affaires				(Note: Henrik Ramel served as legation secretary in China between 1946 and December 1948. After the envoy Sven Allard left China in August 1947, Ramel was chargé d'affaires until Torsten Hammarström took office in April 1948.)
Torsten Hammarström	July 1947 (Note: Appointed in July 1947 but only took office in April 1948.) – 1 October 1949	Ambassador	Also acreddited as envoy to Manila (from 1947) and Bangkok (from 1948)			
People's Republic of China (1949–present)
Torsten Hammarström	1 October 1949 – 1951	Ambassador	Also acreddited as envoy to Manila and Bangkok		13 June 1950	
Staffan Söderblom	1 July 1951 – 1952	Ambassador		Assumed office 15 July		
Hugo Wistrand	1952–1956	Ambassador	Also acreddited to Bangkok (1953–1956)			
Klas Böök	1956–1961	Ambassador	Also acreddited to Bangkok (1956–1959)			
Kjell Öberg	1961–1962	Ambassador				
Lennart Petri	1963–1969	Ambassador	Also acreddited to Phnom Penh (1965–1969)			
Arne Björnberg	1969–1974	Ambassador	Also acreddited to Phnom Penh (1969–1974), Hanoi (1969–1972), and Pyongyang (1973–1974)	Political appointee (non-career diplomat)		
Kaj Björk	1975–1980	Ambassador	Also acreddited to Phnom Penh (until 1979) and Pyongyang	Political appointee (non-career diplomat)		
Sten Sundfeldt	1980–1982	Ambassador	Also acreddited to Pyongyang			
Lars Bergquist	1982–1988	Ambassador	Also acreddited to Pyongyang			
Björn Skala	1988–1991	Ambassador	Also acreddited to Pyongyang			
Sven Linder	23 September 1992 – 1997	Ambassador	Also acreddited to Pyongyang and Ulaanbaatar			
Kjell Anneling	1997–2002	Ambassador	Also acreddited to Pyongyang and Ulaanbaatar			
Börje Ljunggren	20 November 2002 – 2006	Ambassador	Also acreddited to Ulaanbaatar			
Mikael Lindström	2006–2010	Ambassador	Also acreddited to Ulaanbaatar			
Lars Fredén	1 September 2010 – 2016	Ambassador	Also acreddited to Ulaanbaatar		1 December 2010	
Anna Lindstedt	1 September 2016 – February 2019	Ambassador				
Helena Sångeland	2019–2023	Ambassador				
Per Augustsson	August 2023 – present	Ambassador			30 January 2024	

== See also ==
- China–Sweden relations
- Embassy of Sweden, Beijing
- List of ambassadors of China to Sweden
