= List of ambassadors of Sweden to South Korea =

Ambassador of Sweden to South Korea
- Lesser coat of arms of the Kingdom of Sweden
- Incumbent; Karl-Olof Andersson since 2024
- Ministry for Foreign Affairs; Swedish Embassy, Seoul
- Style: His or Her Excellency (formal); Mr. or Madam Ambassador (informal)
- Reports to: Minister for Foreign Affairs
- Residence: 2-7 Seongbuk-dong, Seongbuk District
- Seat: Seoul, South Korea
- Appointer: Government of Sweden
- Term length: No fixed term
- Inaugural holder: Tage Grönwall
- Formation: 1959
- Website: Swedish Embassy, Seoul

The Ambassador of Sweden to South Korea (known formally as the Ambassador of the Kingdom of Sweden to the Republic of South Korea) is the official representative of the government of Sweden to the president of South Korea and government of South Korea.

== History ==
In March 1959, Sweden's ambassador to Tokyo, Tage Grönwall, was appointed to simultaneously serve as minister in South Korea. On 2 April of the same year, Grönwall presented his credentials at a ceremony at President Syngman Rhee's residence. In October 1960, an agreement was reached between the governments of Sweden and the Republic of South Korea to elevate their respective legations to embassies. In connection with this, Sweden's minister in Seoul, Tage Grönwall, was appointed ambassador.

In January 1979, the CEO of the Swedish Trade Council and former CEO of the Tobaksbolaget, Karl Wärnberg, was appointed Sweden's first resident ambassador in Seoul. On 27 February of the same year, Wärnberg formally assumed his position at the embassy. At the same time, State Secretary for Foreign Affairs Leif Leifland visited.

== List of representatives ==
Name	Period	Title	Residence/concurrent accreditation	Notes	Presented credentials	Ref
Tage Grönwall	1959 – October 1960	Envoy	Resident in Tokyo		2 April 1959	
Tage Grönwall	October 1960 – 1962	Ambassador	Resident in Tokyo			
Karl Fredrik Almqvist	1963–1970	Ambassador	Resident in Tokyo			
Gunnar Heckscher	1970–1975	Ambassador	Resident in Tokyo			
Bengt Odevall	1975–1979	Ambassador	Resident in Tokyo			
Carl-Gustav Åkesson	1978–1979	Chargé d'affaires ad interim (Note: He held the following diplomatic rank: embassy counselor)				
Karl Wärnberg	1979–1982	Ambassador		Political appointee (non-career diplomat)		
John Wingstrand	1983–1987	Ambassador				
Christer Sylvén	1987–1992	Ambassador				
Hans Grönwall	1992–1996	Ambassador				
Sture Stiernlöf	1996–2000	Ambassador				
Bo Lundberg	2000–2003	Ambassador				
Harald Sandberg	2003–2005	Ambassador				
Lars Vargö	2006–2011	Ambassador				
Lars Danielsson	2011–2015	Ambassador		Political appointee (non-career diplomat)		
Anne Höglund	2015–2018	Ambassador				
Jakob Hallgren	1 September 2018 – 2021	Ambassador				
Daniel Wolvén	2021–2024	Ambassador				
Karl-Olof Andersson	2024–present	Ambassador			28 October 2024	
