= List of ambassadors of Sweden to Switzerland =

Ambassador of Sweden to Switzerland
- Lesser coat of arms of the Kingdom of Sweden
- Incumbent; Carl Magnus Nesser since 27 June 2023
- Ministry for Foreign Affairs; Swedish Embassy, Bern
- Style: His or Her Excellency (formal); Mr. or Madam Ambassador (informal)
- Reports to: Minister for Foreign Affairs
- Residence: Pourtalèsstrasse 49, Muri bei Bern (Note: The former residence, located at Thunstrasse 67 in Gryphenhübeli, was sold by the National Property Board of Sweden in the first quarter of 2020.)
- Seat: Bern, Switzerland
- Appointer: Government of Sweden
- Term length: No fixed term
- Inaugural holder: Albert Ehrensvärd
- Formation: 12 August 1915
- Website: Swedish Embassy, Bern

The Ambassador of Sweden to Switzerland (known formally as the Ambassador of the Kingdom of Sweden to the Swiss Confederation) is the official representative of the government of Sweden to the president of the Swiss Confederation and the Federal Council.

== History ==
In August 1915, the Swedish government appointed the former minister for foreign affairs, Count Albert Ehrensvärd, as Envoy Extraordinary and Minister Plenipotentiary to the Swiss Confederation. This made him Sweden's first ministerial representative in Switzerland, where the country had previously only been represented by a consular agent in Geneva.

In April 1957, an agreement was reached between the Swedish and Swiss governments on the mutual elevation of the respective countries' legations to embassies. The diplomatic rank was thereafter changed to ambassador instead of envoy extraordinary and minister plenipotentiary.

== List of representatives ==
Name	Period	Title	Resident / Concurrent accreditation	Notes	Presented credentials	Ref
Elof Signeul	January 1814 – 1815	Diplomatic agent				
Albert Ehrensvärd	12 August 1915 – 1918	Envoy				
Patrick Adlercreutz	22 July 1918 – 26 September 1921	Acting envoy (Note: Appointed Acting Envoy Extraordinary and Minister Plenipotentiary to the Swiss Confederation on 22 July 1918; appointed minister resident and head of the Legal Department in the Ministry of Foreign Affairs on 12 September 1919; concurrently serving as acting envoy to the Swiss Confederation from the same date.)				
Patrick Adlercreutz	26 September 1921 – 1922	Envoy				
Jonas Alströmer	28 June 1922 – 1925	Envoy	Also accredited to Budapest and Vienna (from 27 September 1924)			
Einar Hennings	1925–1928	Envoy	Also accredited to Budapest and Vienna		November 1925	
Karl Ivan Westman	1928–1939	Envoy				
Hans Beck-Friis	1939–1940	Envoy				
Zenon P. Westrup	1940–1946	Envoy				
Staffan Söderblom	6 July 1946 – 1951	Envoy		Appointed on 14 June 1946		
Torsten Hammarström	1951 – April 1957	Envoy			7 December 1951	
Torsten Hammarström	April 1957 – 1962	Ambassador				
Fritz Stackelberg	1962–1965	Ambassador				
Klas Böök	1965–1972	Ambassador				
Sven-Eric Nilsson	1973–1982	Ambassador				
Bengt Odevall	1982–1987	Ambassador				
Hans Ewerlöf	1987–1993	Ambassador	Also accredited to Vaduz (from 1991)			
Jan Mårtenson	1993–1995	Ambassador	Also accredited to Vaduz			
Folke Löfgren	1996–2001	Ambassador	Also accredited to Vaduz			
Lars Magnuson	2001–2006	Ambassador	Also accredited to Vaduz			
Per Thöresson	September 2006 – August 2014	Ambassador	Also accredited to Vaduz			
Magnus Hartog-Holm	1 September 2014 – 2019	Ambassador	Also accredited to Vaduz			
Jan Knutsson	1 September 2019 – 2022	Ambassador	Also accredited to Vaduz			
Carl Magnus Nesser	27 June 2023 – present	Ambassador	Also accredited to Vaduz			
