= Anna Lindstedt =

Swedish diplomat (born 1960)

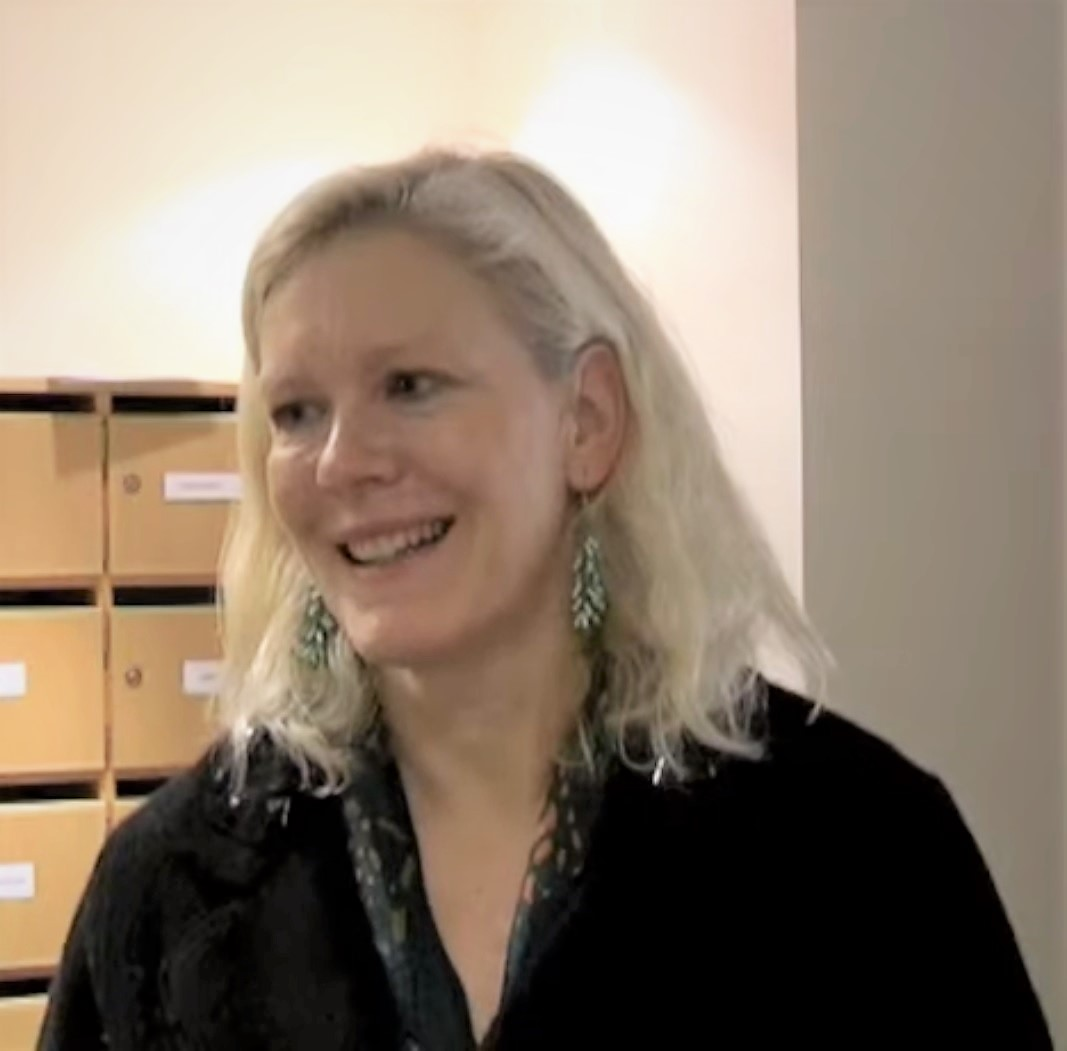
Lindstedt in 2012

Anna Kerstin Erica Lindstedt (born 6 April 1960) is a Swedish diplomat who served as the Ambassador of Sweden to China from 1 September 2016 to February 2019, when she was recalled for her role in the backdoor diplomacy controversy involving Chinese-detained Hong Kong-Swedish writer Gui Minhai's daughter Angela. She was put on trial and acquitted in 2020.

== Education and career ==
Lindstedt grew up in Lund, where she studied at the Lund University. Concurrent with her post in China, Lindstedt served as Ambassador of Sweden to Mongolia. She also served as Ambassador of Sweden to Mexico (2006–2011) and Vietnam (2003–2006). Prior to joining the Foreign Service, she worked as a journalist and teacher.

== Backdoor diplomacy controversy ==
In February 2019, Gui Minhai's daughter Angela made a blog post documenting a "very strange experience" involving Lindstedt. In it, she alleged that Lindstedt contacted her in mid-January and invited her to a meeting in Stockholm that she had set up with some Chinese businessmen who she thought could help secure her father's release.

Angela recounted in her blog that the meetings were held at a private lounge in a Stockholm hotel, where she was sequestered for days, and was even escorted to and from the bathroom. The men, who claimed to have "connections within the Chinese Communist Party", apparently used a mixture of inducements, manipulation and threats on her. She was told that her father's release would be contingent on her stopping her campaign and avoiding media engagement. They offered her a Chinese visa as well as a job in the Chinese embassy. To Angela, Ambassador Lindstedt's presence and seemingly supportive stance suggested the talks were initiated by the Swedish Ministry for Foreign Affairs. She nevertheless felt uncomfortable with the meetings. When she later made inquiries of the Swedish Ministry for Foreign Affairs, it said it was unaware of the events.

The Chinese Embassy in Stockholm denied any involvement; the Swedish Ministry said it was not aware of the events until after the meetings had taken place. It confirmed to the press that the ambassador had been recalled, and that an internal investigation into the incident was under way. Prosecutors investigated her "for breaching the country's national security by ‘arbitrary conduct when negotiating with a foreign power.‘“ On 9 December, Lindstedt was charged by Swedish prosecutors for "arbitrariness during negotiations with a foreign power", an unprecedented charge in modern Sweden, with a possible maximum prison sentence of 2 years. Later on, her trial in Stockholm District Court started in June 2020. On 10 July the lower court ruled that the prosecutors could not prove Anna Lindstedt had exceeded her authority and acquitted her of the charges against her.

Diplomatic posts
Preceded by Marie Sjölander	Ambassador of Sweden to Vietnam; 2003–2006	Succeeded by Rolf Bergman
Preceded by Ewa Polano	Ambassador of Sweden to Mexico; 2006–2011	Succeeded by Jörgen Persson
Preceded by Lars Fredén	Ambassador of Sweden to China; 2016–2019	Succeeded by Helena Sångeland
Preceded by Lars Fredén	Ambassador of Sweden to Mongolia; 2016–2019	Succeeded by Helena Sångeland
