= Helena Sångeland =

Swedish diplomat

Helena Päivikki Sångeland (born 17 September 1961) is a Swedish diplomat.

== Biography ==
She grew up in Gothenburg, where her parents had moved from Finland in the 1950s. She studied economy at Stockholm School of Economics, graduating in 1988, after which she took a job at the publishing house Bra Böcker in Höganäs but soon moved to the Swedish Ministry for Foreign Affairs. She worked at the ministry in Stockholm, but also at the embassies in Helsinki – where she served as embassy secretary between 1992 and 1995 – and Hanoi. A career diplomat, she served in the ministry for 17 years before she was appointed as the Swedish Ambassador to Malaysia in 2005. She was appointed Ambassador to Iran in 2016, until she replaced Anna Lindstedt, Swedish Ambassador to China, who was recalled to Stockholm. She previously headed the Asia and Oceania department at the Swedish Ministry for Foreign Affairs. Sångeland presented her credentials on 16 May 2019. In March 2023, she was appointed as the new Permanent Representative of Sweden to the OECD and Permanent Delegate to UNESCO in Paris.

== Personal life ==
Sångeland is married to architect Patrick Orhammar and has two children.

Diplomatic posts
Preceded by Bruno Beijer	Ambassador of Sweden to Malaysia; 2005–2010	Succeeded by Per-Arne Hjelmborn
Preceded by Peter Tejler	Ambassador of Sweden to Iran; 2016–2019	Succeeded by Mattias Lentz
Preceded by Anna Lindstedt	Ambassador of Sweden to China; 2019–2023	Succeeded by Per Augustsson
Preceded by Anna Lindstedt	Ambassador of Sweden to Mongolia; 2019–2023	Succeeded by Per Augustsson
Preceded by Anna Brandt	Permanent Representative of Sweden to the OECD; 2023–present	Succeeded by Incumbent
