= List of ambassadors of Sweden to Japan =

Ambassador of Sweden to Japan
- Lesser coat of arms of the Kingdom of Sweden
- Incumbent; Viktoria Flodh Li since 1 September 2024
- Ministry for Foreign Affairs; Swedish Embassy, Tokyo
- Style: His or Her Excellency (formal); Mr. or Madam Ambassador (informal)
- Reports to: Minister for Foreign Affairs
- Residence: 1 Chome-10-3-100 Roppongi (Note: The ambassador's residence is at the same location as the chancery.)
- Seat: Tokyo, Japan
- Appointer: Government of Sweden
- Term length: No fixed term
- Inaugural holder: Frederik Philip van der Hoeven
- Formation: 1871
- Website: Swedish Embassy, Tokyo

The Ambassador of Sweden to Japan (known formally as the Ambassador of the Kingdom of Sweden to Japan) is the official representative of the government of Sweden to the emperor of Japan and the government of Japan.

== History ==
Diplomatic relations between Sweden and Japan were established in 1868. Due to letters patent on 11 November 1870, the care of the Sweden–Norway's interests there was handed over to the Dutch trade representation, which employed consuls and vice-consuls partly in Yokohama and Tokyo (Dutch legation), partly in Nagasaki, as well as in Osaka and Hyōgo. By a decision on 9 October 1900, a career Swedish-Norwegian consulate general was established in Kobe with the whole of Japan as its consular district. Upon reorganization in 1906, the consulate general in Kobe was closed, and its functions were taken over by the Swedish legation in Tokyo.

By a decision on 28 September 1906, the consulate general in Japan was assigned to King in Council's minister there, Gustaf Wallenberg. Wallenberg served as consul general from the same date and as envoy extraordinary and minister plenipotentiary from the same year.

In the fall of 1957, an agreement was reached between the Swedish and Japanese governments on the mutual elevation of the respective countries' legations to embassies. The diplomatic rank was thereafter changed to ambassador instead of envoy extraordinary and minister plenipotentiary. Sweden's envoy handed over his letter of credence as ambassador in December of the same year.

From 1995, the ambassador was concurrently accredited to the Marshall Islands and the Federated States of Micronesia. From the autumn of 2008, the ambassador was also concurrently accredited to Palau, which had previously been under the responsibility of Sweden's ambassador in Manila.

== List of representatives ==
Name	Period	Title	Resident / Concurrent accreditation	Notes	Presented credentials	Ref
Empire of Japan (1868–1947)
Frederik Philip van der Hoeven	1871–1872	Resident minister				
Wilhelm Ferdinand Henrik van Wekherlin	1872–1878	Resident minister				
Edmond W.F. Wittewaall van Stoetwegen	1879–1881	Resident minister				
Johannes Jakobus van der Plot	1881–1889	Resident minister				
Dmitri Louis van Bylandt	1890–1896	Resident minister				
Hannibal Casimir Johannes Testa	1896–1900	Resident minister				
Hannibal Casimir Johannes Testa	1900–1902	Envoy				
Arthur M.D. Swerts de Landas Wyborgh	1902–1905	Envoy				
John Loudon	1905–1906	Acting Envoy				
Gustaf Wallenberg	1906–1920	Envoy	Also acreddited to Beijing	Also served as consul general from 28 September 1906		
Patrik Reuterswärd	18 February 1912 – 14 June 1912	Chargé d'affaires ad interim				
Patrik Reuterswärd	11 October 1913 – 5 February 1914	Chargé d'affaires ad interim				
Thore Fevrell	1917–1919	Chargé d'affaires ad interim (Note: Held the diplomatic rank of legation secretary.)	Also in Beijing (from 1918)			
David Bergström	7 May 1918 – 1920	Acting Envoy	Also acreddited to Beijing			
David Bergström	11 June 1920 – 1922	Envoy	Also acreddited to Beijing			
Oskar Ewerlöf	18 December 1922 – 1928	Envoy	Also acreddited to Beijing		June 1923	
Johan Hultman	1928–1936	Envoy	Also acreddited to Beijing (from 1929) and Bangkok (from 1931)			
Widar Bagge	1937 – April 1945	Envoy	Also acreddited to Bangkok			
Erik von Sydow	April 1945 – 15 February 1946	Chargé d'affaires ad interim (Note: Held the diplomatic rank of first legation secretary.)				
–	1946–1947	–		Vacant		
Japan (1947–present)
Leif Öhrvall	1948–1951	Diplomatic representative				
Karl-Gustav Lagerfelt	1951–1952	Diplomatic representative				
Karl-Gustav Lagerfelt	1952–1956	Envoy				
Tage Grönwall	9 July 1956 – December 1957	Envoy				
Tage Grönwall	December 1957 – 1962	Ambassador	Also acreddited to Seoul (from 1959)			
Karl Fredrik Almqvist	1963–1970	Ambassador	Also acreddited to Seoul			
Gunnar Heckscher	1970–1975	Ambassador	Also acreddited to Seoul			
Bengt Odevall	1975–1981	Ambassador	Also acreddited to Seoul (1975–1979)			
Gunnar Lonaeus	1981–1986	Ambassador				
Ove Heyman	1986–1991	Ambassador				
Magnus Vahlquist	1992–1997	Ambassador	Also acreddited to Marshall Islands (from 1995) and the Federated States of Micronesia (from 1995 (Note: One souce states 1995 and another 1996.))			
Krister Kumlin	1997–2002	Ambassador	Also acreddited to Marshall Islands and the Federated States of Micronesia			
Mikael Lindström	2002–2006	Ambassador	Also acreddited to Marshall Islands and the Federated States of Micronesia			
Stefan Noreén	2006–2011	Ambassador	Also acreddited to Marshall Islands, the Federated States of Micronesia, and Palau (from 2008)			
Lars Vargö	2011–2014	Ambassador	Also acreddited to Marshall Islands, the Federated States of Micronesia, and Palau			
Magnus Robach	2014–2019	Ambassador	Also acreddited to Palau			
Pereric Högberg	1 September 2019 – 2024	Ambassador	Also acreddited to Palau and the Federated States of Micronesia			
Viktoria Li	2024–present	Ambassador				

== See also ==
- Japan–Sweden relations
- Embassy of Sweden, Tokyo
