= Sten Heckscher =

Swedish lawyer and politician

Sten Heckscher (born 29 July 1942) is a Swedish lawyer and Social Democratic politician.

He graduated with a degree in law from Uppsala University. Even though his father was leader of what later became the Moderate Party, Heckscher himself engaged in Social Democratic politics. He served in numerous public positions in and out of government until Prime Minister Ingvar Carlsson appointed him Minister of Industry and Employment on the eve of the Social Democrats' election victory in 1994. In 1996, he resigned to become National Police Commissioner. Heckscher served until 2005 when he was appointed chief judge of the Administrative Court of Appeal in Stockholm. On 1 October 2007, he became President of the Supreme Administrative Court of Sweden.

== Early life ==
Heckscher was born on 29 July 1942 in Stockholm, Sweden, the son of former leader of the Right Wing Party, Professor Gunnar Heckscher, and his wife Anna Britta (née Vickhoff). He is grandson of economist Eli Heckscher. Heckscher received a Candidate of Law degree from Uppsala University in 1968.

== Career ==
Heckscher did his clerkship from 1969 to 1971. Heckscher was a member of the 1968 Education Investigation (1968 års utbildningsutredning) from 1971 to 1973 and became an aspirant in the Svea Court of Appeal in 1973, and a Legal Clerk in 1974. He was an expert in the Swedish National Council for Crime Prevention from 1976 to 1978 and in the Ministry of Justice in 1979. Heckscher became an assessor in 1982 and was a member of the Commission on Narcotic (Narkotikakommissionen) from 1982 to 1984. He was deputy director-general (departementsråd) in the Ministry of Justice from 1984 to 1986 and director-general for legal affairs (rättschef) in the Ministry of Employment from 1986 to 1987. Heckscher served as State Secretary in the Ministry of Justice from 1987 to 1991 and as Director General and head of the Swedish Patent and Registration Office from 1991 to 1994. In 1996, Heckscher was appointed National Police Commissioner.

Heckscher was also responsible for legal and institutional issues in Sweden's EEA negotiations from 1989 to 1991, investigator in the legislation for Sweden's accession to the EU from 1993 to 1994, investigator in Legal Aid Law (Rättshjälpslagen) from 1993 to 1994, chairman of the board of Retriva AB from 1993 to 1994, and was investigator in the authorization and supervision of auditors in 1994.

== Personal life ==
In 1990, he married Louise Nermark (born 1959), the daughter of Jerker Nermark and Gull Snellman.

Government offices
Preceded by Per Westerberg	Minister for Enterprise; 1994–1996	Succeeded by Jörgen Andersson
Civic offices
Preceded by Sten Niklasson	Director General of the Swedish Patent and Registration Office; 1991–1994	Succeeded by Carl-Anders Ifvarsson
Preceded by Björn Eriksson	National Police Commissioner; 1996–2004	Succeeded by Stefan Strömberg
Legal offices
Preceded by Rune Lavin	President of the Supreme Administrative Court of Sweden; 2007–2010	Succeeded by Mats Melin
