= Bengt Odevall =

Swedish diplomat (1921–2006)

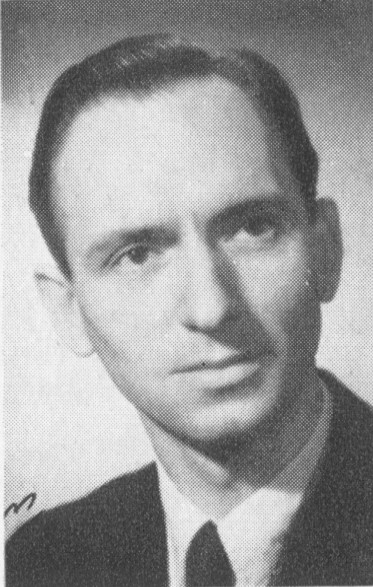
- Born: 24 January 1921; Bräkne-Hoby, Sweden
- Died: 18 February 2006 (aged 85); Stockholm, Sweden
- Education: Uppsala University
- Occupation: Diplomat
- Years active: 1945–1993
- Spouse: Ulla Stålhammar (m. 1944)
- Children: 4

Bengt Odevall (24 January 1921 – 18 February 2006), was a Swedish diplomat. Odevall began his career in 1945 as an attaché at Sweden's Ministry for Foreign Affairs after completing his law degree at Uppsala University. Over his career, he held multiple prominent posts abroad, including in Madrid, New York City, and London, and later as consul general in Minneapolis. He was appointed ambassador to Brazil in 1970. Following his work in Brazil, he served as ambassador in Tokyo from 1975 to 1981, Seoul from 1975 to 1979, and his final post was in Bern from 1982 to 1987. In addition to his diplomatic roles, he led Swedish delegations in major international negotiations and represented Sweden in trade and arbitration, showcasing his expertise in both diplomacy and international trade.

== Early life ==
Odevall was born on 24 January 1921 in Bräkne-Hoby Parish, Blekinge County, Sweden, the son of mayor Ragnar Odevall and his wife Elin (née Ohlsson). He passed studentexamen in Linköping in 1940, completed the reserve officer exam in 1942, and earned a Candidate of Law degree from Uppsala University in 1945. That same year, he was appointed as a lieutenant in the Swedish Air Force reserve.

== Career ==
Odevall became an attaché at the Ministry for Foreign Affairs in 1945, with postings in Madrid, New York City, London, Vienna, and at the United Nations General Assembly. He was appointed director at the Ministry in 1963 and deputy director in 1965. From 1965 to 1967, he served as director for the Kooperativa Förbundet, followed by roles as consul general in Minneapolis from 1968 to 1970 and ambassador to Rio de Janeiro in 1970, and Brasília in 1972.

In December 1970, when Odevall was the ambassador to Brazil, some Brazilian newspapers and radio stations confused Sweden with Switzerland and reported that Odevall had been kidnapped. This was actually incorrect: it was the Swiss ambassador, Giovanni Bucher, who had been kidnapped on the orders of army captain Carlos Lamarca. After five years in Brazil, Odevall became ambassador in Tokyo in 1975 and concurrently to Seoul from 1975 to 1979. His last posting as ambassador was in Bern from 1982 to 1987.

In addition to his diplomatic assignments, he was secretary, chairman and representative in several committees, councils and negotiations. Odevall served as head secretary of the Committee on Foreign Affairs from 1962 to 1965, chaired the International Coffee Council in 1963 and again from 1964 to 1965, and led the United Nations Sugar Conference in 1965. He represented Sweden in trade negotiations with Poland, Czechoslovakia, Hungary, Romania, and Bulgaria from 1963 to 1965. Odevall was chairman of the Arbitration of Brazil-United States Dispute on Processed Coffee in 1969. In 1981, he was a spokesperson for Sweden, Finland, and Norway at the General Agreement on Tariffs and Trade (GATT) multilateral textile negotiations. He also served on the board of Svenska Nestlé AB from 1987 to 1993.

== Personal life ==
In 1944, Odevall married Ulla Stålhammar (born 1921), the daughter of book printer Anton Stålhammar and Elisabeth (née Österberg). They had four children: Michael (born 1946), Christian (born 1948), Stefan (born 1953), and Henrik (born 1958).

== Death ==
Odevall died on 18 February 2006 in Stockholm. The funeral service was held at Vårdinge Church in Södertälje Municipality.

== Awards and decorations ==
- (Sweden) Commander of the Order of the Polar Star (6 June 1974)
- (Spain) Knight of the Order of Isabella the Catholic

Diplomatic posts
Preceded by Olof Landenius	Consul General of Sweden to Minneapolis; 1968–1970	Succeeded by Knut Granstedt
Preceded by Gustaf Bonde	Ambassador of Sweden to Brazil; 1970–1975	Succeeded by Gunnar Lonaeus
Preceded by Gunnar Heckscher	Ambassador of Sweden to Japan; 1975–1981	Succeeded by Gunnar Lonaeus
Preceded by Gunnar Heckscher	Ambassador of Sweden to South Korea; 1975–1979	Succeeded by Karl Wärnberg
Preceded by Sven-Eric Nilsson	Ambassador of Sweden to Switzerland; 1982–1987	Succeeded by Hans Ewerlöf
