= Torsten Hammarström =

Swedish diplomat (1896–1965)

- Born: Torsten Ludvig Hammarström; 10 June 1896; Stockholm, Sweden
- Died: 9 May 1965 (aged 68); Stockholm, Sweden
- Education: Uppsala University
- Occupation: Diplomat
- Years active: 1921–1962

Torsten Ludvig Hammarström (10 June 1896 – 9 May 1965) was a Swedish diplomat who served in the Swedish Ministry for Foreign Affairs and in diplomatic missions in Europe, Asia, and the United States. During his career, he held various positions in Berlin, Chicago, Helsinki, Brussels, The Hague, Rome, Prague, China, Thailand, the Philippines, and Switzerland. He served as Sweden's envoy in Prague after the Second World War and later as ambassador in China and Switzerland. In 1950, he became Sweden's ambassador to the newly established People's Republic of China.

== Early life ==
Hammarström was born on 10 June 1896 in Hedvig Eleonora Parish, Stockholm, Sweden, the son of County Governor Alexis Hammarström (1858–1936) and his wife Maria (née Engellau). He received a Candidate of Law degree from Uppsala University in 1920 and a Bachelor of Arts degree in 1921.

== Career ==
Hammarström was appointed as an attaché at the Ministry for Foreign Affairs in 1921, alongside Sven Allard, Magnus Hallenborg, and Rolf Arfwedson, among others. He served in Berlin in 1922, Chicago in 1923, at the Foreign Ministry in 1925 and in Helsinki in 1927. He was second secretary in 1928, second legation secretary in Brussels and The Hague in 1929, first secretary at the Foreign Ministry in 1931 and in Berlin 1935.

Hammarström was head of the Foreign Ministry's agency for inheritance and compensation matters in 1936, the trade department's first agency in 1939 and was legation counsellor in Rome in 1940. He was an expert and representative of trade negotiations with Germany in 1940 and Italy from 1941 to 1944. Hammarström was sent as envoy to Prague just after the war was over, with the task to reopen the Swedish legation, which had been closed during the Nazi occupation. Hammarström stayed as envoy in Prague to 1947 and was then ambassador in Nanking from 1947 to 1950.

In May 1950, Sweden and China established diplomatic relations. Sweden was the first Western country to found such relations with the newly established People's Republic and for this reason, chairman Mao Zedong decided to personally receive the Swedish ambassador, Torsten Hammarström, when presenting his letter of credentials which was quite unusual, and a sign that China attached great importance to this diplomatic breakthrough. Hammarström was ambassador in Beijing from 1950 to 1951 as well as being accredited as envoy in Bangkok and Manila from 1947 to 1951. Hammarström was envoy in Bern from 1951 to 1957 and ambassador in Bern from 1957 to 1962.

== Death ==
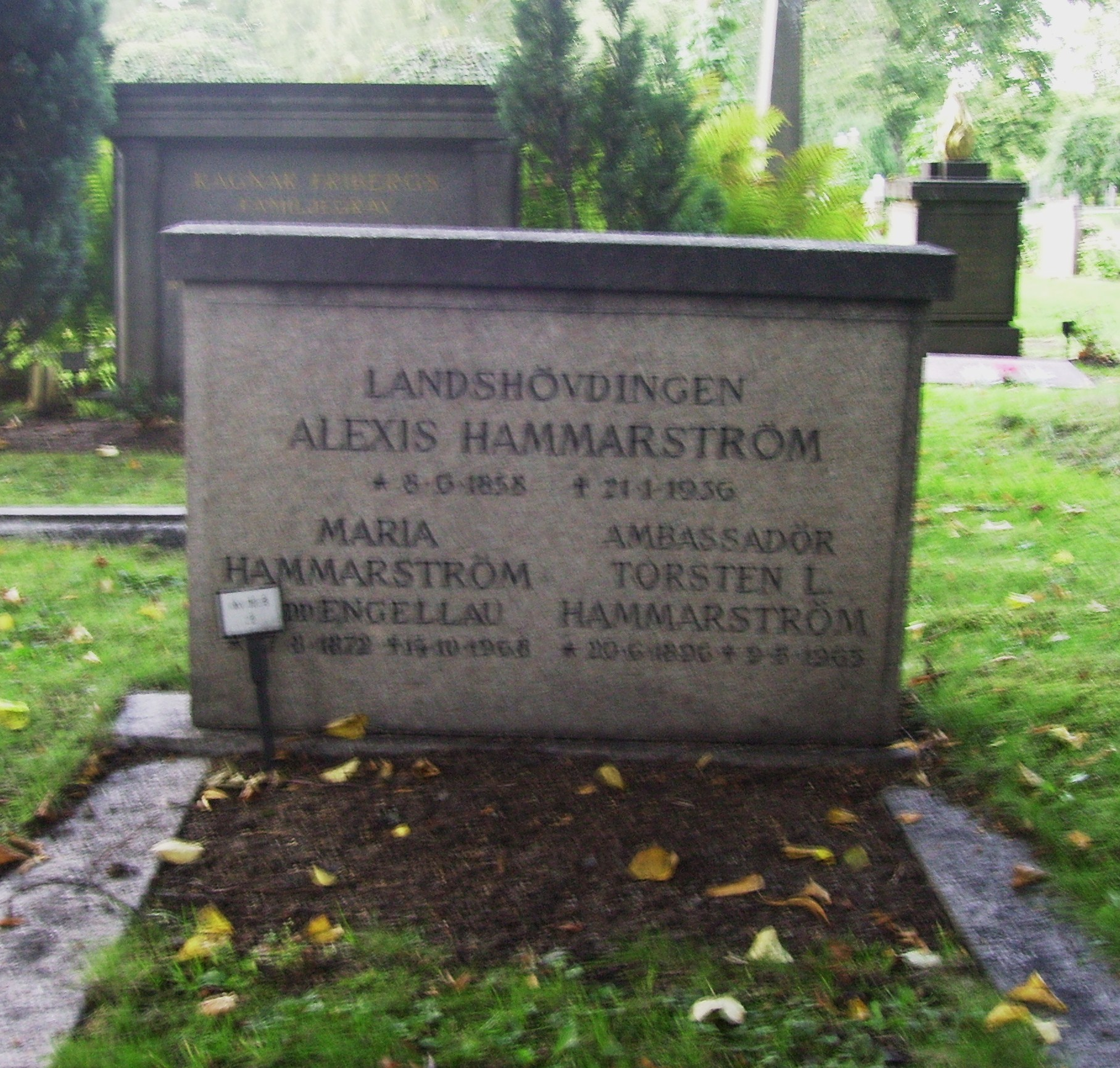
Torsten Hammarström's family grave at Norra begravningsplatsen in Stockholm.

Hammarström died on 9 May 1965. He was interred on 27 May 1965 at Norra begravningsplatsen in Stockholm.

== Contemporary assessments ==
Ambassador Olof Landenius described Torsten Hammarström as "a man of pronounced devotion to duty, who set high standards for himself and expected wholehearted efforts from his colleagues, based on knowledge and efficiency. He was warm-hearted and generous by nature, and faithfully maintained contact with friends and colleagues throughout the world. His magnificent hospitality, both in Rome during the war years, where he served as Counsellor of Legation, and later as head of mission in Prague, China and Bern, could no doubt be attested to by hundreds of members of the Swedish communities abroad and Swedish travellers.

His home in Bern, thoughtfully furnished, reflected his appreciation for culture and the arts. He was respected among antiquarian booksellers and antique dealers in Italy, France, Switzerland, and southern Germany. Additionally, his dedicated efforts helped secure the notable donation of Bodoni prints to Uppsala University Library, a gesture made by him and other former students in tribute to their Alma Mater.

== Awards and decorations ==
=== Swedish ===
- (Sweden) Commander Grand Cross of the Order of the Polar Star (6 June 1962)
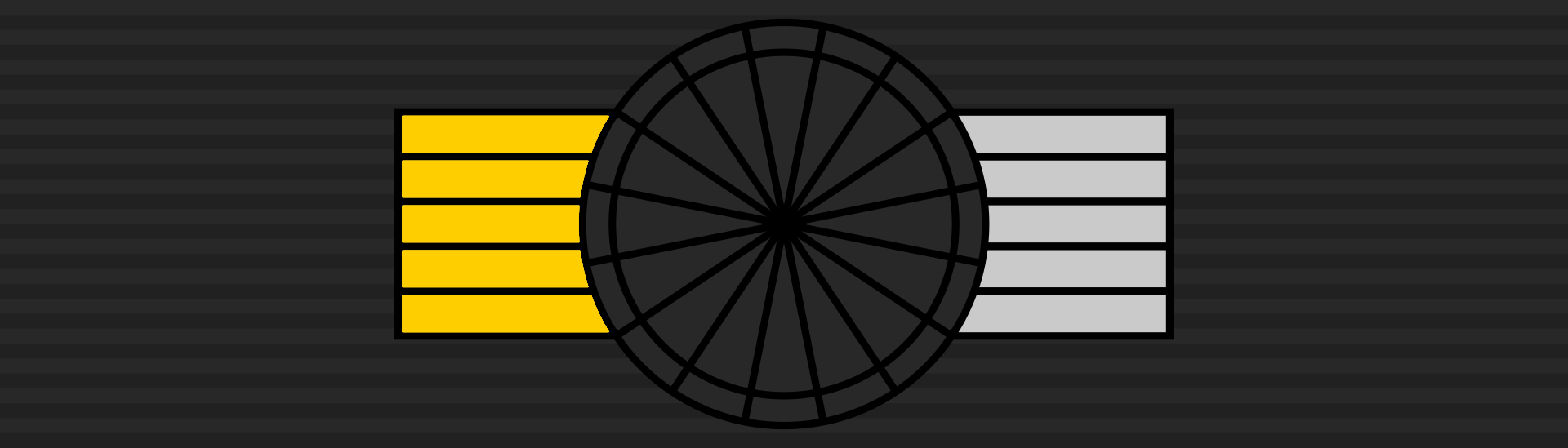
- (Sweden) Commander 1st Class of the Order of the Polar Star (6 June 1953)
- (Sweden) Commander of the Order of the Polar Star (5 June 1948)
- (Sweden) Knight of the Order of the Polar Star (1939)

=== Foreign ===
- Grand Officer of the Order of the Crown of Italy
- Commander of the Order of the White Rose of Finland
- (Italy) Commander of the Order of Saints Maurice and Lazarus (20 October 1941)
- (Netherlands) Commander of the Order of Orange-Nassau (14 March 1946)
- (Nazi Germany) 1st Class of the Order of the German Eagle
- (Belgium) Officer of the Order of the Crown
- (Latvia) Officer of the Order of the Three Stars
- (Belgium) Knight of the Order of Leopold
- (Spain) Knight of the Order of Civil Merit

Diplomatic posts
Preceded by Folke Malmar	Envoy of Sweden to Czechoslovakia; 1945–1947	Succeeded by Wilhelm Winther
Preceded by Sven Allard	Ambassador of Sweden to China; 1947–1951	Succeeded by Staffan Söderblom
Preceded by Widar Bagge	Envoy of Sweden to Thailand; 1947–1951	Succeeded by Hugo Wistrand
Preceded by None	Envoy of Sweden to the Philippines; 1947–1951	Succeeded by Wilhelm Wachtmeister
Preceded by Staffan Söderblom	Envoy/Ambassador of Sweden to Switzerland; 1951–1962	Succeeded by Fritz Stackelberg
