= American Joint Committee for Assisting Japanese-American Orphans =

American Joint Committee for Assisting Japanese-American Orphans is an American private agency responsible for intracountry adoptions of Japanese-American children after World War II. See also Sweden v. Yamaguchi
