= Staffan Söderblom =

Swedish diplomat (1900–1985)

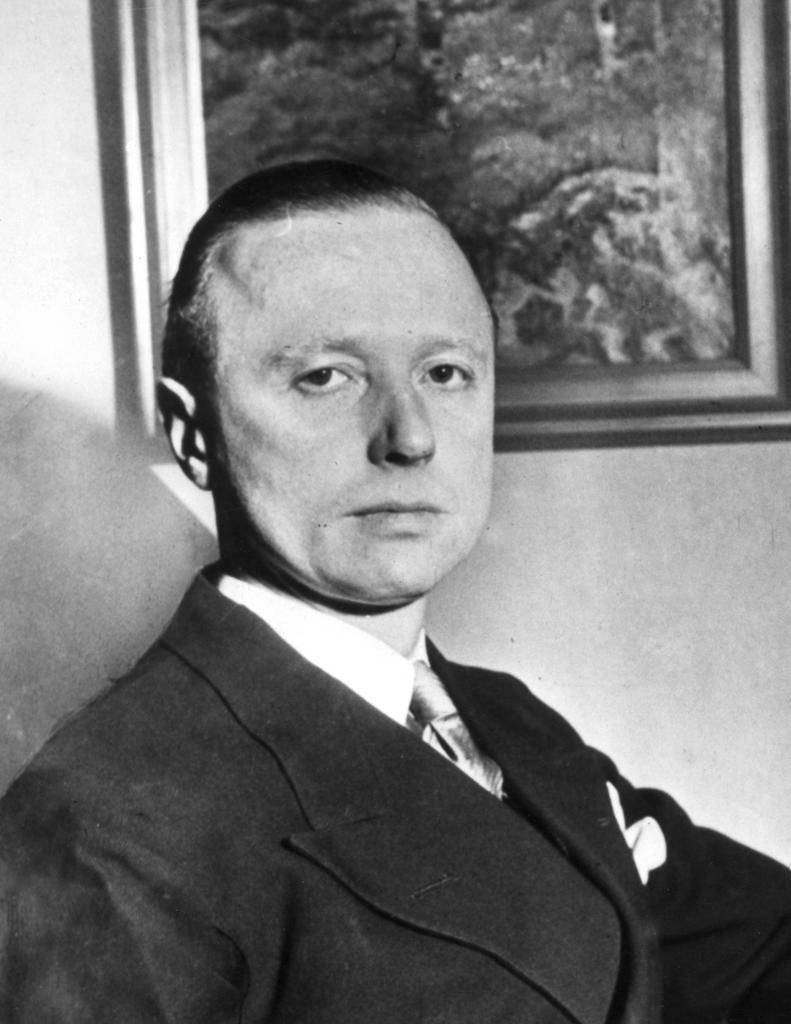
- Born: Staffan John Söderblom; 14 July 1900; Paris, France
- Died: 11 December 1985 (aged 85); Uppsala, Sweden
- Resting place: Uppsala Old Cemetery
- Education: Högre allmänna läroverket i Upsala
- Alma mater: Uppsala University
- Occupation: Diplomat
- Years active: 1921–1954
- Spouse: Marian Margery Lacey (m. 1946; died 1980)
- Father: Nathan Söderblom

Staffan John Söderblom (14 July 1900 – 11 December 1985) was a Swedish diplomat whose career spanned over three decades. After completing his education at Uppsala University, he joined the Swedish Ministry for Foreign Affairs in 1921, serving at missions across Europe—including Antwerp, London, Rotterdam, Kristiania (Oslo), Vienna, Bern, and Moscow—and participating in international arbitration and League of Nations work. He rose through the ranks, becoming second secretary in 1929, first secretary in 1933, and director in 1936.

In 1938, Söderblom was appointed director general and head of the Political Department, overseeing Sweden's foreign policy during World War II. He handled sensitive matters such as defence planning, relations with neighboring countries, and interactions with major powers including Nazi Germany and the Soviet Union, while managing issues like German transit requests and strategic wartime negotiations. He became known for advocating a pragmatic, cautious approach toward both Germany and the Soviet Union.

In 1944, he was appointed envoy to Moscow, where he dealt with critical issues such as the influx of Baltic refugees, Swedish assets under Soviet control, and the disappearance of Raoul Wallenberg. His work was marked by careful judgment and an awareness of political constraints, which shaped the Swedish government's response to these delicate matters. Söderblom later served briefly as envoy in Bern (1946) and Beijing (1951) before illness forced his return to Sweden in 1952, and he retired in 1954.

== Early life ==
Staffan Söderblom was born on 14 July 1900 in Paris, France, as the third son of Archbishop Nathan Söderblom (1866–1931) and the writer and philanthropist Anna Söderblom (1870–1955). His grandfather was the parish priest Jonas Söderblom (1823–1901), and he was brother to actor Helge Söderblom (1896–1932), officer Sven Söderblom (1898–1976), and civil servant Jon Olof Söderblom (1906–1981). He was also the uncle of civil servant Robert Söderblom (1927–2010).

A precociously gifted student, Söderblom completed his secondary school graduation at the Högre allmänna läroverket in Uppsala on 20 May 1916, before his 16th birthday, earning recognition in newspapers as Sweden's youngest graduate. He enrolled at Uppsala University later that year, earning a Bachelor of Arts in 1918, completing cavalry and non-commissioned officer training from 1918 to 1920, and being commissioned as a second lieutenant in the Life Regiment Dragoons on 31 December 1920. He then received his Candidate of Law degree from Uppsala University on 5 November 1921.

== Career ==
=== Early career ===
Söderblom became an attaché at the Swedish Ministry for Foreign Affairs in 1921 and served at Swedish missions in Antwerp, London, Rotterdam, Kristiania (now Oslo), Vienna, Bern, and Moscow. He was promoted to second secretary in 1929, first secretary in 1933, and director (byråchef) in 1936. He also served as secretary to Sweden's representative at the League of Nations Assembly from 1930 to 1938, to the arbitrators in the Greco-Bulgarian dispute over Central Rhodope from 1930 to 1933, to the arbitral tribunal in the French-Swiss dispute regarding the free zones in Gex and Savoy in 1933, and as secretary in the Committee on Foreign Affairs in 1937.

Söderblom became part of a group of young diplomats in the 1930s who were either recruited or fast-tracked in their careers and, together with a number of senior colleagues, formed "the core of the corps that would later bear the burden and stress during the world war."

=== Head of the Political Department ===
Söderblom was appointed director general (utrikesråd) and head of the Ministry for Foreign Affairs' Political Department in 1938. During his tenure, he was responsible for managing complex foreign policy issues during World War II, including Sweden's first line of defence and relations with neighboring countries and major powers such as Nazi Germany and the Soviet Union. He led the work of analyzing and formulating foreign policy in an extremely challenging period, when Sweden faced pressure and threats from multiple directions. During the war, the Political Department served as the central preparatory body for a range of highly complex and controversial matters, including the handling of Nazi Germany's demands for the transit of military personnel and materiel across Swedish territory.

As head of the Political Department and later as envoy in Moscow, Söderblom became one of the leading Swedish diplomats advocating a policy that was understanding of and accommodating toward Nazi Germany and, later, the Soviet Union. Numerous letters to and from Söderblom, as well as other official documents in which he participated, are preserved in the Ministry for Foreign Affairs' white papers on Transit Issues from April–June 1940 (1947) and The Transit Issue June–December 1940 (1947).

=== Envoy in Moscow ===
Söderblom was appointed envoy to Moscow on 28 April 1944 and assumed his post on 16 July of the same year. He succeeded Vilhelm Assarsson, who had been declared persona non grata on 17 December 1943. According to Söderblom, Prime Minister Per Albin Hansson and Foreign Minister Christian Günther delayed his appointment because the Soviet demand for Assarsson's recall was seen as a serious diplomatic breach. The Swedish government preferred to wait for the Soviets to make the first move. At a government meeting on 17 March 1944, Günther proposed Sven Allard for the post, but the proposal was not approved; the reasons are unclear, though Söderblom's credentials were considered stronger. During his time as head of the Ministry for Foreign Affairs' Political Department, Söderblom had served as Günther's right-hand man.

The precise reasons for assigning Söderblom to Moscow are not fully documented. One possible explanation is that the Swedish government wanted to emphasize the importance of relations with the new regional power on the eastern and southeastern coasts of the Baltic Sea by sending a senior diplomat with extensive experience in dealing with Soviet representatives in Stockholm, including the envoy Alexandra Kollontai.

During his tenure in Moscow, Söderblom was again responsible for handling several complex issues, including the large influx of refugees from the Baltic states to Sweden. In the latter half of 1944, as the Soviet army advanced through Estonia, Latvia, and Lithuania, an estimated 30,000 Baltic refugees, mainly Estonians and Latvians, crossed the Baltic Sea to Sweden. From December 1944 to March 1946, the Soviet Union repeatedly demanded the total repatriation of these refugees to their occupied homelands. In addition to refugee issues, Söderblom's responsibilities included managing Swedish economic assets in areas that, following Nazi Germany's collapse, came under Soviet military control, as well as matters related to the disappearance of Swedish diplomat Raoul Wallenberg, which became one of the most sensitive and closely watched issues of the period.

During his service, he received information from Soviet authorities indicating that Raoul Wallenberg might have died, which he forwarded to the Ministry for Foreign Affairs in Stockholm. The investigation SOU 2003:18 – A Diplomatic Failure (2003) describes Söderblom's work as characterized by caution and a realistic assessment of the political limitations in dealing with the Soviet Union. He responded with prudence and pessimism to the information he received and chose not to vigorously challenge the Soviet accounts. This influenced how the Swedish foreign leadership perceived the situation and what measures were considered feasible. The investigation notes that this caution may have contributed to Sweden not acting more decisively in the early stages of the Wallenberg case. At the same time, Söderblom is presented as a diplomat working under highly sensitive and complex conditions, balancing Sweden's relations with the Soviet Union with the aim of protecting Swedish citizens' interests. Overall, Staffan Söderblom emerges as a central figure in the Wallenberg affair, whose judgments and diplomatic strategies had significant consequences for how the matter was handled, with the report highlighting both his caution and the constraints imposed by the positions of Sweden and the Soviet Union.

=== Later career ===
Söderblom was appointed envoy in Bern in 1946 and in Beijing in 1950. His service in Beijing was very brief, as he had to return to Sweden in 1952 due to illness. He continued working at the Ministry for Foreign Affairs in 1952 but was placed on inactive status on 1 January 1954. He retired from active service shortly thereafter and did not return to professional life.

== Personal life ==
Söderblom married Marian Margery Lacey on 20 November 1946 at St George, Kensington, London. She was born on 19 February 1898 in Norwich, Norfolk, England, and died on 30 January 1980 in Chelsea, London. Marian was the daughter of Baptist pastor Robert Lee Lacey and Maria Travers Taylor, and had previously been married to diplomat George David Howard Fullerton‑Carnegie.

== Death ==
Söderblom died on 11 December 1985 in Uppsala Cathedral Parish in Uppsala, Sweden. The funeral service was held on 9 January 1986 at Holy Trinity Church in his hometown of Uppsala. He was interred on 22 April 1986 at Uppsala Old Cemetery.

== Awards and decorations ==
=== Swedish ===
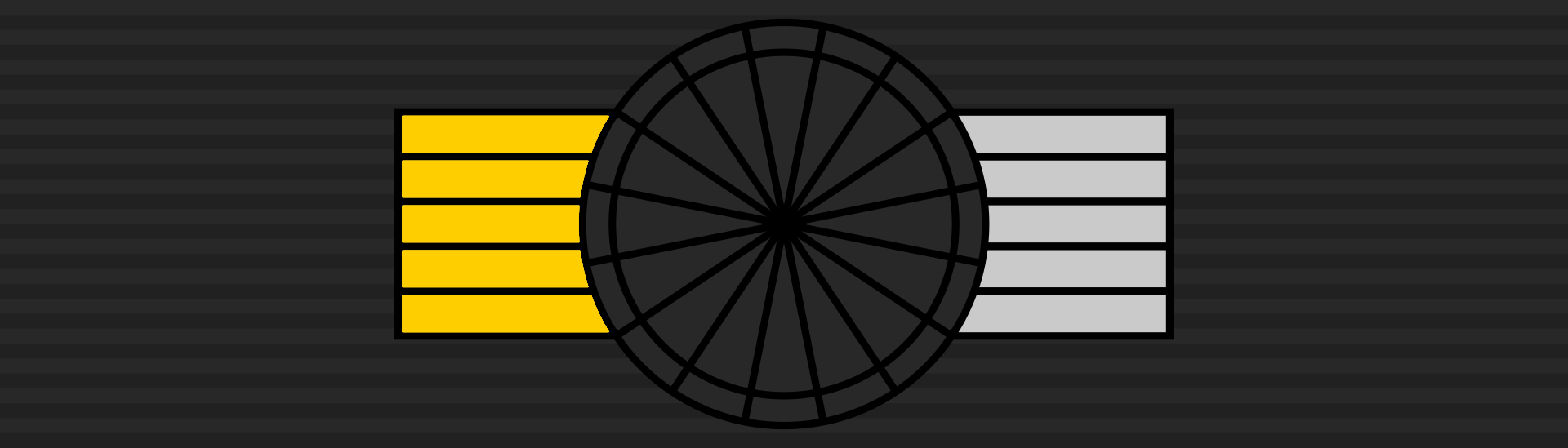
- (Sweden) Commander 1st Class of the Order of the Polar Star (18 November 1946)
- (Sweden) Commander of the Order of the Polar Star (6 June 1941)
- (Sweden) Knight of the Order of the Polar Star (1937)

=== Foreign ===
- (Spain) Knight of the Order of Civil Merit (1928)
- (Poland) Officer of the Order of Polonia Restituta (1930)
- (Belgium) Commander of the Order of Leopold II (1935)
- (Nazi Germany) 1st Class of the Order of the German Eagle (1938)
- (Ethiopian Empire) Grand Officer of the Order of Menelik II (1941)
- (Kingdom of Italy) Grand Officer of the Order of Saints Maurice and Lazarus (1941)
- Commander of the Order of the White Rose of Finland (1941)
- (Denmark) Commander 1st Class of the Order of the Dannebrog (1942)
- (Mexico) Sash of the Order of the Aztec Eagle (1943)
- (Kingdom of Greece) Grand Cross of the Order of the Phoenix (1946)
- (France) Commander of the Legion of Honour (1946)

Diplomatic posts
Preceded by Vilhelm Assarsson	Envoy of Sweden to the Soviet Union; 1944–1946	Succeeded by Gunnar Hägglöf
Preceded by Zenon P. Westrup	Envoy of Sweden to Switzerland; 1946–1951	Succeeded by Torsten Hammarström
Preceded by Torsten Hammarström	Ambassador of Sweden to China; 1951–1952	Succeeded by Hugo Wistrand
