= Gunnar Heckscher =

Swedish political scientist (1909–1987)

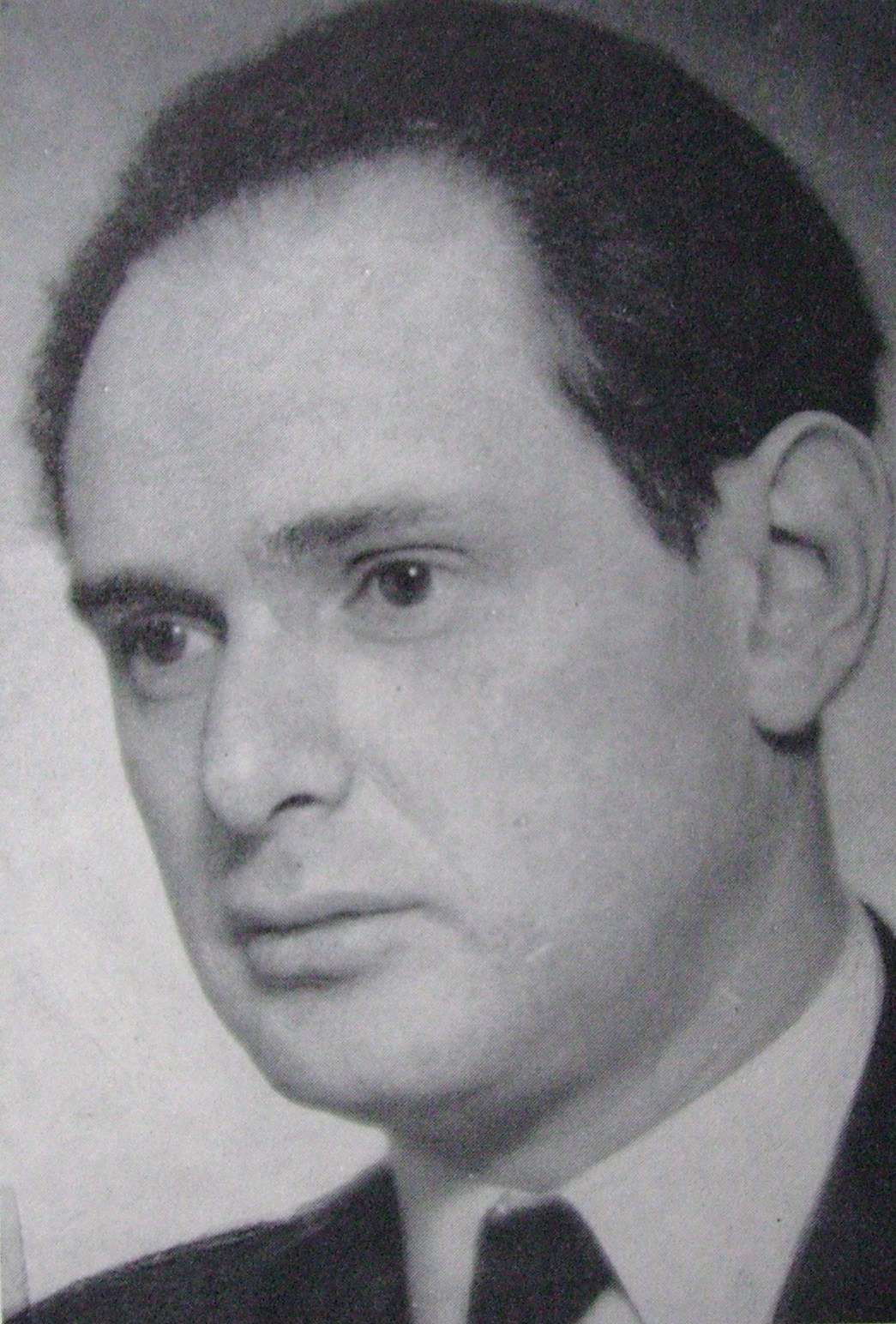
- Heckscher in 1959
- Born: Gunnar Edvard Heckscher; 8 July 1909; Danderyd, Sweden
- Died: 24 November 1987 (aged 78); Uppsala, Sweden
- Education: Uppsala University
- Occupations: Political scientist, diplomat
- Years active: 1941–1975
- Spouse: Anna Vickhoff (m. 1934; died 1976)
- Children: 5, including Sten Heckscher

Gunnar Edvard Heckscher (8 July 1909 – 24 November 1987) was a prominent Swedish political scientist, academic, and conservative politician. He earned his Doctor of Philosophy in 1934 and soon became a docent in political science at Uppsala University. Throughout the 1930s and 1940s, he lectured in political science at both Uppsala University and Stockholm University College. He later held significant roles at the Stockholm School of Social Work, where he became rector in 1945 and professor of political science by 1948. In 1961, Heckscher became chairman of the National Organization of the Swedish Conservative Party, serving until 1965, and was a member of Sweden's Lower House of the Riksdag, representing the Right Party, where he advocated for Sweden's membership in the European Community.

Heckscher also had a distinguished diplomatic career, serving as Sweden's ambassador in New Delhi (1965–1970), Tokyo (1970–1975), and as a delegate to the United Nations in 1975. Throughout his career, he held various international roles, including vice-chair of the International Political Science Association and membership on the Council of Europe's Consultative Assembly, where he chaired the Economic Committee. Additionally, he played key roles in several governmental committees, focusing on psychological defence, public administration, and constitutional reform.

== Early life ==
Heckscher was born on 8 July 1909 Danderyd, Sweden, the son of Professor Eli Heckscher and teacher Ebba Westberg. He received a Bachelor of Arts degree from Uppsala University in 1927, a Licentiate degree in 1932, and a Doctor of Philosophy degree in 1934. Heckscher became docent in political science at Uppsala University in 1933. He lectured in political science at Uppsala between 1933 and 1941 and at Stockholm University College between 1941 and 1948.

== Career ==
Heckscher served as assistant director for the Stockholm School of Social Work and Public Administration (Stockholms socialinstitut) in 1941, acting director in 1942, and became a lecturer in government and municipal studies in 1945. He was appointed as rector from 1945 to 1954, held the title of Professor of Political Science there from 1948 to 1958, and then at Stockholm University College from 1958 to 1965. He was chairman of the National Organization of the Swedish Conservative Party (Högerpartiets riksorganisation) from 1961 to 1965, ambassador in New Delhi from 1965 to 1970 (with dual accreditation in Colombo and Kathmandu), Tokyo from 1970 to 1975 (with dual accreditation in Seoul), and UN delegate in 1975.

Heckscher served as a visiting professor at the University of Chicago in 1948 and Seattle University in 1979. He was director of the Swedish Institute from 1954 to 1957, a member of the editorial board for Svensk tidskrift from 1931 to 1932 and again from 1935 to 1961, and a city council member in Uppsala from 1938 to 1941.

Heckscher held various prominent appointments, including serving as a member and secretary of the Social Education Expert Committee from 1942 to 1946, a member of the Defence Information Inquiry (Försvarets upplysningsutredning) in 1944, the 1945 Military Inquiry, the Social Science Research Committee (Socialvetenskapliga forskningskommittén) in 1945, the National Swedish Rent Tribunal (Statens hyresråd) from 1945 to 1947, the Municipal Information Committee (Kommunala upplysningskommittén) in 1946, the Municipal Information Board (Kommunala upplysningsnämnden) in 1947, the Manpower Inquiry (Arbetskraftsutredningen) from 1950 to 1955, and the State Social Science Research Council (Statens samhällsvetenskapliga forskningsråd) from 1951 to 1952.

Under the UN's mandate, he helped establish a public administration training institute in Ankara from 1952 to 1953, where he served as Resident Representative in 1953. He was also chairman of the National Swedish Psychological Defence Planning Committee (Beredskapsnämnden för psykologiskt försvar) from 1954 to 1959, led the Prison Administration Inquiry from 1955 to 1959, and became a member of the Council of Europe's Consultative Assembly in 1957, joining its executive committee in 1960.

In politics, he served in Sweden's Lower House of the Riksdag from 1957 to 1965, representing the Right Party on the Committee on Foreign Affairs. He chaired the Conservative Party Youth League from 1949 to 1952, took on leadership roles in the Conservative Party National Organization (Högerns riksorganisation) in 1961 (serving as second vice-chairman in 1958), and served in the parliamentary right wing. After having been deputy chairman, Heckscher was elected leader of the party in 1961 and served until 1965. He was an early supporter of Swedish membership of the European Community.

Heckscher was also vice-chair of the International Political Science Association from 1952 to 1958. Heckscher's board appointments included the Swedish Institute from 1948 to 1952, the Sweden–America Foundation in 1950, the Swedish Student House in Paris in 1956, and the Stockholm School of Social Work and Public Administration in 1959. From 1957 to 1965, Heckscher was a member of the Council of Europe's Consultative Assembly, where he chaired the Economic Committee. He later chaired the Rights Protection Inquiry (Rättighetsskyddsutredningen) from 1977 to 1978 and the Constitutional Committee (Grundlagskommittén) from 1980 to 1981.

== Personal life ==
In 1934, Heckscher married Anna Vickhoff (1910–1976), the daughter of Emil Vickhoff and Ellen (née Ryd). They had five children: Eva (1936–2004), Einar (1938–2020), Sten (born 1942), Ivar (born 1943), and David.

One of his sons is Sten Heckscher, Social Democratic politician and later National Police Commissioner.

== Death ==
Heckscher died in Uppsala on 24 November 1987 and is buried at Skogskyrkogården in Stockholm.

== Awards and decorations ==
- (Sweden) Illis quorum, 18th size (1987)
- (Sweden) Commander of the Order of the Polar Star (15 November 1968)
- (Sweden) Knight of the Order of the Polar Star (1954)

Party political offices
Preceded by Jarl Hjalmarson	Chairperson of the Rightist Party; 1961–1965	Succeeded by Yngve Holmberg
Diplomatic posts
Preceded by Klas Böök	Ambassador of Sweden to India; 1965–1970	Succeeded by Axel Lewenhaupt
Preceded by Klas Böök	Ambassador of Sweden to Celon; 1965–1970	Succeeded by Axel Lewenhaupt
Preceded by Karl Fredrik Almqvist	Ambassador of Sweden to Japan; 1970–1975	Succeeded by Bengt Odevall
Preceded by Karl Fredrik Almqvist	Ambassador of Sweden to South Korea; 1970–1975	Succeeded by Bengt Odevall
