= Hugo Wistrand =

Swedish diplomat (1895–1983)

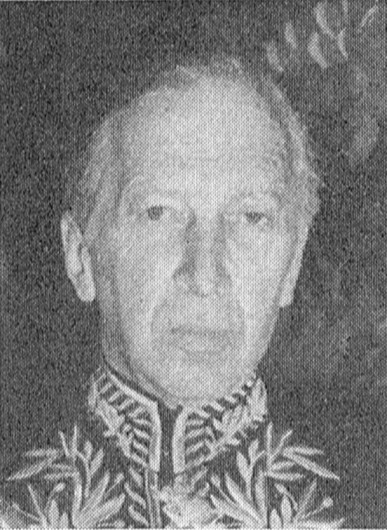
- Born: Tor Hugo Wilhelm Wistrand; 2 April 1895; Norrköping, Sweden
- Died: 26 February 1983 (aged 87); Châteauneuf-Grasse, France
- Education: Uppsala University; École des Sciences Politiques; University of Paris
- Occupation: Diplomat
- Years active: 1919–1961
- Spouse: Katharine Corbin Parsons (m. 1928; died 1968)
- Children: 2

Tor Hugo Wilhelm Wistrand (2 April 1895 – 26 February 1983) was a Swedish diplomat.

== Early life ==
Wistrand was born on 2 April 1895 in Norrköping, Sweden, the son of Hugo Wistrand, an accountant, and his wife Anna (née Lindwall). He received a Bachelor of Arts degree at Uppsala University in 1915 and a Candidate of Law degree in 1918. Wistrand enrolled in the same year in the École des Sciences Politiques and at the Faculty of Law of the University of Paris where he later received a Doctor of law degree in 1922 and became Lauréat de la Faculté de Droit the year after.

== Career ==
Wistrand was honorary attaché in Bern in 1919, attaché at the Ministry for Foreign Affairs the same year and became acting administrative officer in 1920. He was then secretary to the delegation of the Åland Islands dispute at the League of Nations Federal Council meeting in London and Paris in 1920. Wistrand was assistant secretary of the Scandinavian ministerial meeting in Copenhagen the same year and the secretary to the Swedish delegation at the League of Nations First Assembly in Geneva the same year.

He was attaché in New York City in 1921, in Berlin the same year and attaché in Paris in 1922. Wistrand was acting second legation secretary in London in 1922 and became second legation secretary in 1925. He was administrative officer (second secretary) at the Swedish Foreign Ministry in 1926, second legation secretary in Berlin in 1929 and first legation secretary there in 1931. Wistrand then became first secretary at the Foreign Ministry in 1935 and first legation secretary in Tokyo in 1936. He was legation counsellor in Berlin in 1940 and the same in Washington, D.C. in 1941. Wistrand was deputy director at the Foreign Ministry in 1948 and Director (Utrikesråd) in 1949. He was ambassador to Beijing from 1952 to 1956 and also accredited to Bangkok as envoy extraordinaire and minister plenipotentiary from 1953 to 1956. An obituary states that "Upon his departure from China, Wistrand received a rare and beautiful Chinese sculpture as a personal gift from Mao Zedong, an honor that has rarely been bestowed upon any other envoy".

Wistrand ended his diplomatic career by being ambassador in Brussels and in Luxembourg City from 1956 to 1961. In 1969 Wistrand was awarded an honorary doctorate by Uppsala University.

== Personal life ==
On 19 January 1928 he married Katharine Corbin Parsons (1905–1968), the daughter of William Usher Parsons (1873–1933) and Katharine (née Corbin) of 1 Lexington Avenue, New York City. The ceremony took place in the American Church in Paris. Katharine Corbin Parsons was the granddaughter of Lieutenant General Henry Clark Corbin. Wistrand and Corbin Parsons had two children; Sylvie (born 1928) and Philippa (1933–1990).

Wistrand was a resident of Châteauneuf-Grasse, France.

== Death ==
Wistrand died on 26 February 1983 in Châteauneuf-Grasse, France. He was interred on 22 July 1983 at Matthew's burial ground (Matteus begravningsplats) in his hometown of Norrköping.

== Awards and decorations ==
=== Swedish ===
- (Sweden) Commander 1st Class of the Order of the Polar Star (6 June 1958)
- (Sweden) Commander of the Order of the Polar Star (11 November 1952)
- (Sweden) Knight of the Order of the Polar Star (1944)
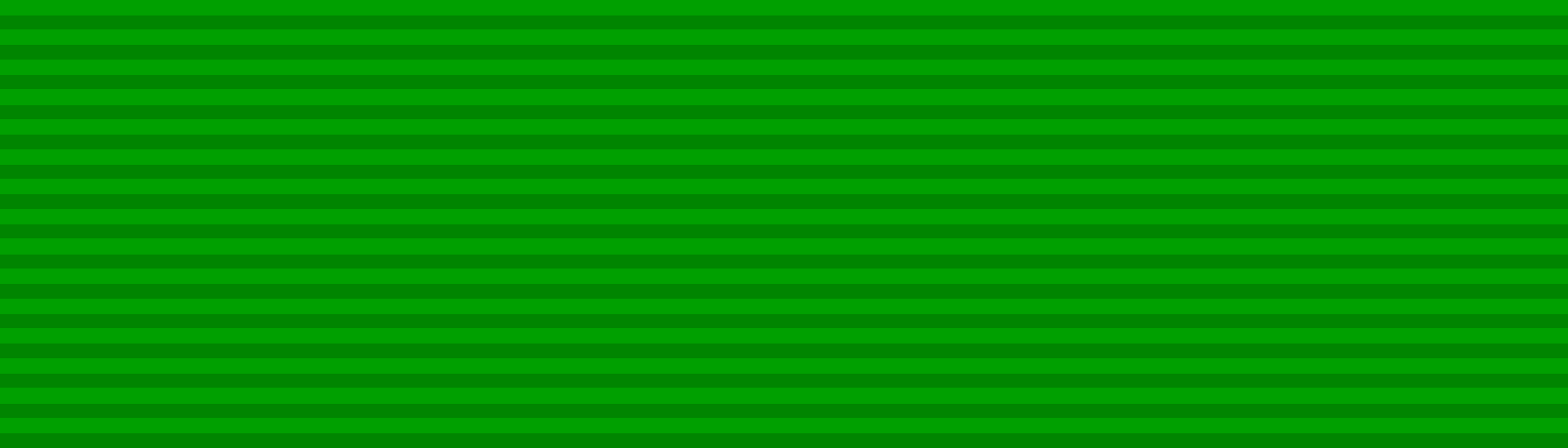
- (Sweden) Knight of the Order of Vasa (1939)

=== Foreign ===
- (Belgium) Grand Cross of the Order of Leopold II
- (Luxembourg) Grand Cross of the Order of the Oak Crown
- Grand Cross of the Order of the Crown of Thailand
- (Denmark) Commander 1st Class of the Order of the Dannebrog
- (Hungary) Grand Officer of the Hungarian Order of Merit
- (Japan) 3rd Class of the Order of the Sacred Treasure
- (Netherlands) Commander of the Order of Orange-Nassau
- (Nazi Germany) 1st Class of the Order of the German Eagle
- (Poland) Officer of the Order of Polonia Restituta

== Bibliography ==
- Wistrand, Hugo (1968). Les exceptions apportées aux droits de l'auteur sur ses œuvres [Exceptions to rights of authors in their work] (in French). Paris. SELIBR 8179382.
- Wistrand, Hugo (1965). Le droit d'auteur en Suède et en France : comparaison des législations récentes [Copyright in Sweden and France: comparison of recent legislation] (in French). Paris: RIDA.
- Wistrand, Hugo (1923). La diplomatie et les conflits de nationalités, principes et méthodes [Diplomacy and conflicts of nationalities, principles and methods] (in French). Paris: A. Pedone.
- Wistrand, Hugo (1921). "The Principle of Equilibrium and the Present Period". American Journal of International Law. 15 (4): 523–29. doi:10.2307/2188286. JSTOR 2188286. S2CID 147656291.
- Wistrand, Hugo (1920). Etudes sur les rapports entré la Suéde et la France en matiére de nationalité [Studies on relations between Sweden and France in respect of nationality] (in French).

Diplomatic posts
Preceded by Staffan Söderblom	Ambassador of Sweden to China; 1952–1956	Succeeded by Klas Böök
Preceded by Torsten Hammarström	Envoy of Sweden to Thailand; 1953–1956	Succeeded by Klas Böök
Preceded by Gunnar Reuterskiöld	Ambassador of Sweden to Belgium; 1956–1961	Succeeded by Stig Unger
Preceded by Gunnar Reuterskiöld	Ambassador of Sweden to Luxembourg; 1956–1961	Succeeded by Stig Unger
