= Japan–Sweden relations =

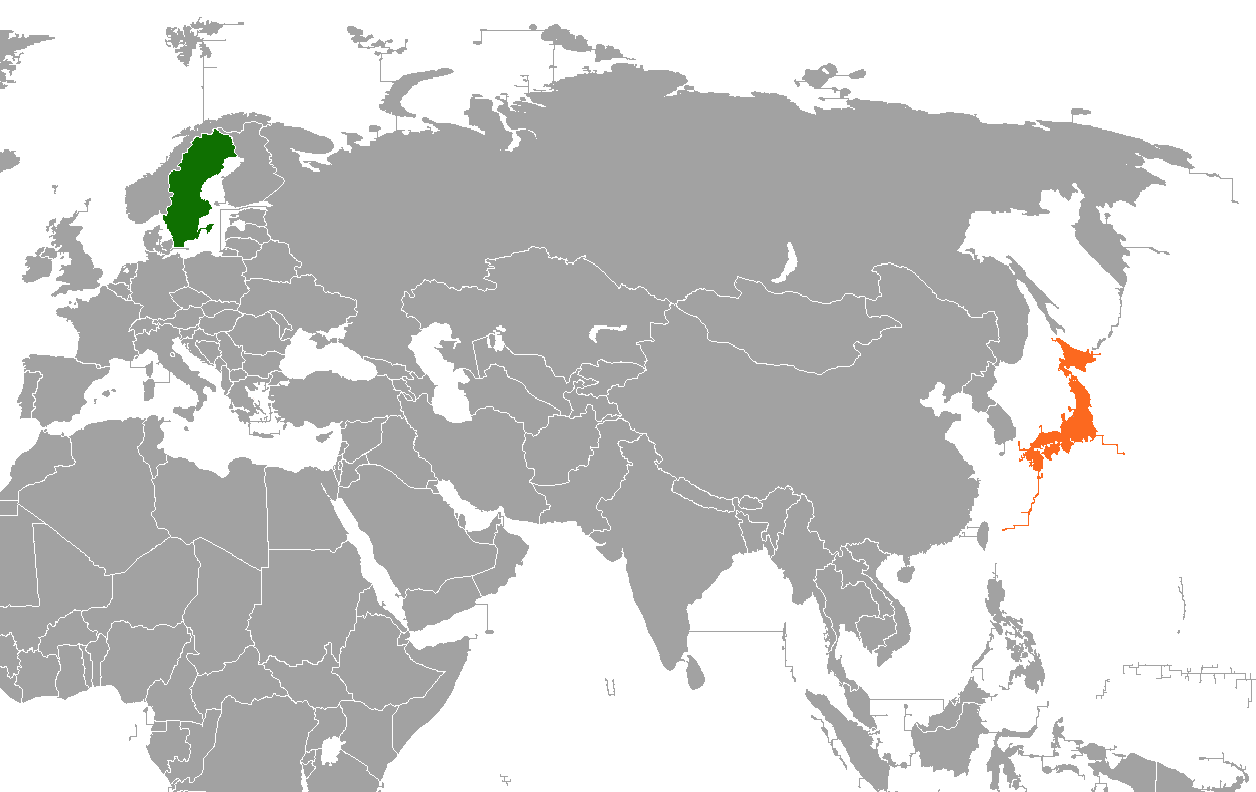
- Sweden: Japan

Japan–Sweden relations are the bilateral relations of Japan and the Kingdom of Sweden. Japan has an embassy in Stockholm. Sweden has an embassy in Tokyo. Contacts between the two countries can be traced back to the 18th century when Carl Peter Thunberg, a disciple of the botanist Carl Linnaeus, came to Japan for plant collecting and researching. This made him the first Swedish national to visit Japan.

The formal diplomatic relations of Japan and Sweden was established by the signing of Swedish-Japanese Treaty in 1868, which was also the first treaty the Meiji Government made with a foreign state. During the first decade of the 20th century, the two countries started opening legations in Tokyo and Stockholm, then promoted to embassies in 1957.

Japan is Sweden's second largest trading partner in Asia, and some Swedish policies on welfare, population ageing and international affairs like peacekeeping and official development assistance have been taken concern, or even example of, by Japan. The bilateral relations are also strengthened through state visits, royal visits, cultural or academic exchanges from both side.

== Resident diplomatic missions ==
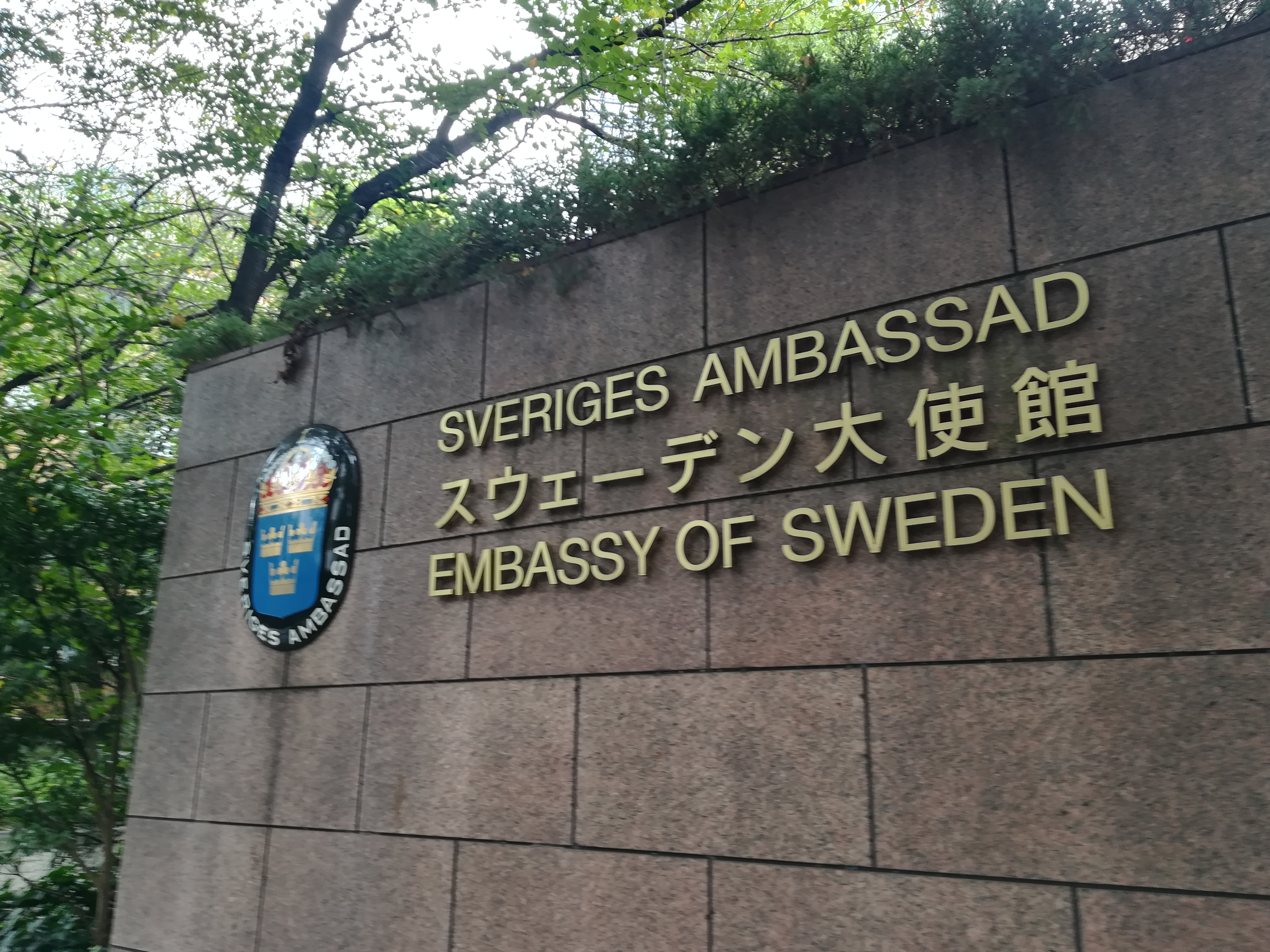
Embassy of Sweden, Tokyo

- Japan has an embassy in Stockholm.
- Sweden has an embassy in Tokyo.

== See also ==
- Foreign relations of Japan
- Foreign relations of Sweden
- Japanese in Sweden
