= Östra Karup =

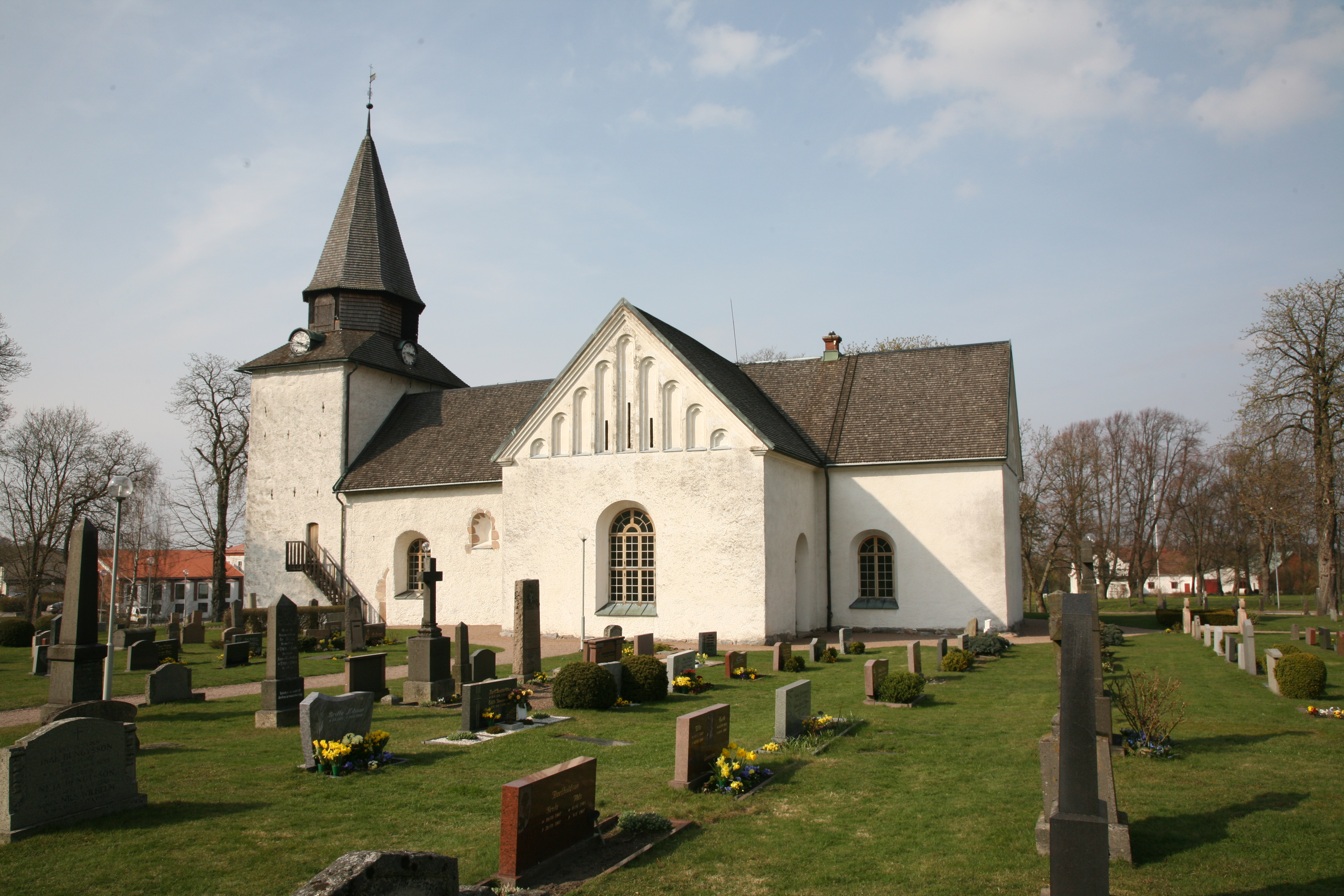
- Östra Karup Church

- Location within Skåne Location within Sweden
- Coordinates: 56°25′N 12°57′E
- Country: Sweden
- Province: Halland
- County: Skåne County
- Municipality: Båstad Municipality

Area
  - Total: 0.85 km^{2} (0.33 sq mi)

Population (31 December 2010)
  - Total: 594
  - Density: 697/km^{2} (1,810/sq mi)
- Time zone: UTC+1 (CET)
  - Summer (DST): UTC+2 (CEST)

Östra Karup (Swedish pronunciation: [ˈœ̌sːtra ˈkɑ̌ːrɵp]) is a locality situated in Båstad Municipality, Skåne County, Sweden with 594 inhabitants in 2010.
