= Tage Grönwall =

Swedish diplomat (1903–1988)

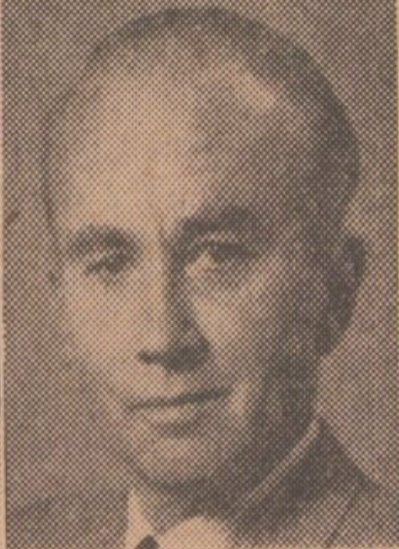
- Born: Tage Holm Fredrik Grönwall; 7 February 1903; Stockholm, Sweden
- Died: 6 March 1988 (aged 85); Stockholm, Sweden
- Education: Stockholm University College
- Occupation: Diplomat
- Years active: 1930–1979
- Spouse: Inger Ericson (m. 1929)
- Children: 2

Tage Holm Fredrik Grönwall (7 February 1903 – 6 March 1988) was a Swedish diplomat.

== Early life ==
Grönwall was born on 7 February 1903 in Stockholm, Sweden, the son of Consul General Fredrik Grönwall and his wife Anna (née Holm). He passed his studentexamen in Djursholm in 1921 and earned a Candidate of Law degree from Stockholm University College in 1927.

== Career ==
Grönwall did his clerkship in Linde Judicial District from 1928 to 1930, before he became an attaché at the Ministry for Foreign Affairs in 1930. Grönwall served in Paris in 1931, London in 1932, Dublin in 1933 and in Vienna, Belgrade and Budapest in 1934. He was the acting first secretary at the Foreign Ministry in 1937 (acting second secretary in 1934), acting first secretary of legation in London from 1939 and 1940, acting director at the Foreign Ministry in 1943 and mission counsellor in Rome from 1947 to 1951. Grönwall was envoy in Athens from 1951 to 1956, envoy in Tokyo from 1956 to 1957 and ambassador in Tokyo from 1957 to 1962. He was at the same time envoy in Seoul from 1959 to 1960 and ambassador from 1960 to 1962 whilst stationed in Tokyo. Grönwall was ambassador in Brussels from 1965 to 1969.

He became chairman of Stockholm University College's legal association in 1927 and was an employee of Swedish Law Journal (Svensk juristtidning) from 1941 to 1947. Grönwall was member of the Foreign Capital Control Office (Flyktkapitalbyrån) from 1945 to 1947 and was a representative in negotiations on trade policy matters in Stockholm in 1945, Washington, D.C. in 1946, Rome in 1948 and in Annecy in 1949. He was mediator in the Neutral Nations Supervisory Commission in Korea from 1954 to 1955 and head of the Swedish Delegation from 25 September 1969 to 31 March 1970. Grönwall was chairman of Solvay Svenska AB from 1969 to 1979, Deputy Marshal of the Diplomatic Corps (Introduktör av främmande sändebud) from 1971 to 1974 and then Marshal of the Diplomatic Corps from 1975 to 1979. He also served as chairman of the Swedish-Belgian Association from 1976 to 1979.

== Personal life ==
In 1929, Grönwall married Inger Ericson (1908–1996), daughter of Rear Admiral Hans Ericson and Elin (née Gadelius). He was the father of Anita (born 1930) and Hans-Fredrik (born 1939).

== Death ==
Grönwall died on 6 March 1988. He was interred on 3 August 1988 at Djursholms begravningsplats in Djursholm.

== Awards ==
- (Sweden) Commander 1st Class of the Order of the Polar Star (6 June 1962)
- (Sweden) Commander of the Order of the Polar Star (11 November 1957)
- (Sweden) Knight of the Order of the Polar Star (1947)
- (Greece) Grand Cross of the Order of the Phoenix
- (Norway) Commander of the Order of St. Olav (1 July 1947)
- (Lithuania) Officer of the Order of Vytautas the Great
- (Poland) Officer of the Order of Polonia Restituta
- (Belgium) Knight of the Order of the Crown

== Honours ==
- Honorary Doctor of Jurisprudence, Kyung Hee University (8 May 1962)

Diplomatic posts
Preceded by Alexis Aminoff	Envoy of Sweden to Greece; 1951–1956	Succeeded by Fritz Stackelberg
Preceded by Karl-Gustav Lagerfelt	Envoy and ambassador of Sweden to Japan; 1956–1962	Succeeded by Karl Fredrik Almqvist
Preceded by None	Envoy and ambassador of Sweden to South Korea; 1959–1962	Succeeded by Karl Fredrik Almqvist
Preceded by Fritz Stackelberg	Ambassador of Sweden to Greece; 1962–1965	Succeeded by Gösta Brunnström
Preceded by Stig Unger	Ambassador of Sweden to Belgium; 1965–1969	Succeeded by Tord Göransson
Preceded by Alexis Aminoff	Marshal of the Diplomatic Corps; 1975–1979	Succeeded by Olof Landenius
Military offices
Preceded by Karl Sergel	Head of Swedish Delegation to the NNSC; 25 September 1969 – 31 March 1970	Succeeded by Tryggve Sjölin
