= Bluff Hospital =

Geography
- Location: 82 Bluff, Yokohama, Japan
- Coordinates: 35°26′13.6″N 139°39′5.2″E

History
- Opened: 1863
- Closed: 1982

Bluff Hospital is a hospital and clinic active in the medical care of foreign residents of Yokohama, Japan.
