= Embassy of Sweden, Tokyo =

Diplomatic mission of Sweden in Japan

- Location: Tokyo
- Address: ARK Mori Building, 16th floor, 1-12-32 Akasaka, Minato-ku, Tokyo (Note: Temporary until 2026 due to renovation.)
- Coordinates: 35.66711°N 139.74014°E
- Opened: 1906
- Ambassador: Viktoria Li
- Jurisdiction: Japan
- Website: Official website

The Embassy of Sweden in Tokyo is Sweden's diplomatic mission in Japan. The mission was opened in 1906. It's located in the Roppongi district in Minato, Tokyo since 1959. The current embassy building was inaugurated in 1991. The ambassador since 2024 is Viktoria Li.

== History ==
Diplomatic relations between Sweden and Japan were established in 1868. Due to letters patent on 11 November 1870, the care of the Sweden–Norway's interests there was handed over to the Dutch trade representation, which employed consuls and vice-consuls partly in Yokohama and Tokyo (Dutch legation), partly in Nagasaki, as well as in Osaka and Hyōgo. By a decision on 9 October 1900, a career Swedish-Norwegian consulate general was established in Kobe with the whole of Japan as a district. Upon reorganization in 1906, the consulate general in Kobe was closed, and its functions were taken over by the Swedish legation in Tokyo.

By a decision on 28 September 1906, the consulate general in Japan was assigned to King in Council's minister there, Gustaf Wallenberg. Wallenberg served as consul general from the same date and as envoy extraordinary and minister plenipotentiary from the same year. The shipowner Wallenberg focused on developing trade during a time when Sweden was very unknown in Japan. On the same date, a salaried vice-consul was appointed in Tokyo, who would also serve at the mission. At the 1913 parliament session, King in Council's proposition regarding the withdrawal of the latter function was approved.

From at least 1914, the address of the legation was 24 Tsukiji, Tokyo. Between 1920 and 1930 the legation in Tokyo moved almost every year: In 1920, the address was 44 Sakurada-cho Azabu, Tokyo, in 1921 the address was Azabu 25 Mikawadaimachi, Tokyo, in 1922 the address was 22 Kasumicho Azabu, Tokyo, in 1923 the address was 15 Kaminibanchô, Köjimachiku, Tokyo, 1924–1927 the address was 67 Tansumachi, Azabu-ku, Tokyo, 1928–1929 the address was 52 Hikawacho Akasaka-ku, Tokyo, and in 1930 it moved to 63 Zaimoku-cho, Azabu-ku, Tokyo where it remained until 1937. From 1938, the address was 22 Nishi-machi, Azabu-ku, Tokyo.

In May 1944, the Swedish legation in Tokyo was evacuated together with the legations and embassies of other countries. The neutral powers were moved to the resort town of Karuizawa, about 150 km northwest of Tokyo. For the Swedish legation, however, this evacuation did not mean that operations in Tokyo ceased. Only the European officials were moved to Karuizawa, the Japanese staff were allowed to remain and work in Tokyo under the direction of two Swedish officials, who took it in turns to serve in the capital for a week at a time. At the beginning of 1945, 19 Europeans were employed at the Swedish legation, along with a numerous staff of Japanese men and women.

In the 1930s, a group of Swedish businessmen were dissatisfied with the Swedish representation in Japan and collected almost SEK 500,000 so that the Swedish state could buy a plot of land in Roppongi, Tokyo. This was materialised when a new embassy was inaugurated in Roppongi in 1959. Two years prior, in 1957, both Sweden and Japan raised the status of their missions to embassies. Until 1959 the residence was located at 22 Nishi-machi, Azabu, Minato-ku and the chancery was located at »Kikai Boeki Kaikan», rooms 505 & 506, No. 3, 7-chome, Tamachi, Akasaka, Minato-ku. The address from 1 June 1959 was Azabu-Ichibeicho, Minato-ku.

The embassy has been located in the same place in Roppongi since 1959 when the Swedish government received the land as a gift from a group of Swedish representatives. From the 1968, address was 3-go, 10-ban, 1-chome, Roppongi, Minato-ku. In the 1980s, part of the plot was sold and thus a new embassy needed to be built. The new and current embassy was inaugurated in 1991. The embassy is located in the Shiroyama Hills and has a terrace-shaped structure that sweeps up from two floors in an arch to a height of nine floors. The building comprises premises for the chancery, residence, trade office and an office for the Swedish Agency for Growth Policy Analysis, Growth Analysis (Myndigheten för tillväxtpolitiska utvärderingar och analyser, Tillväxtanalys). In addition, there are about 20 apartments, of which about half are used as housing for embassy' staff. From the autumn of 2013, external tenants will also rent offices and some apartments.

During the summer of 2023, the embassy temporarily moved to the ARK Mori Building in Akasaka due to renovation work expected to be completed in 2026.

== Staff and tasks ==
=== Staff ===
The Swedish Embassy in Tokyo has approximately 30 employees across various functions, including the ambassador, political and environmental officers, economic and trade officials, cultural and public diplomacy staff, consular and administrative personnel, defence attaché staff, and members of the Office of Innovation and Research. Additionally, Business Sweden is represented at the embassy.

=== Tasks ===
The Swedish Embassy in Tokyo represents Sweden and the Swedish government in Japan. Over the years, Sweden and Japan have developed strong ties in various fields. In addition to a vibrant business and trade exchange, the embassy collaborate in areas such as science, innovation, creative industries, and education, as well as on the international stage through bilateral and multilateral cooperation. The Swedish Embassy in Tokyo is organized into several sections, each responsible for different functions:

- Political, Environmental, and Climate Affairs: Focuses on political relations, environmental issues, and climate policy. This section includes a counselor, officers, an assistant, and an intern.
- Economic and Trade Policy, Trade and Investment Promotion: Handles economic and trade relations, promoting business and investment between Sweden and Japan. It includes a first secretary, several officers, and an intern.
- Sweden Promotion, Cultural Affairs, and Public Diplomacy: Responsible for promoting Sweden, managing cultural relations, and handling public diplomacy. The team includes officers and assistants.
- Consular and Administrative Affairs: Provides consular services and manages administrative tasks. This section includes secretaries, a receptionist, a driver, and staff handling consular, migration, and administrative matters.
- Defence Affairs: Oversees military relations and defence cooperation. It includes a defence attaché (lieutenant colonel) and an officer.
- Office for Innovation and Research: Focuses on innovation and research collaboration. This section includes an innovation and research counselor, an acting office head/advisor, and an officer.
- Business Sweden: Manages trade promotion and supports Swedish businesses in Japan, led by a trade commissioner.

== Buildings ==
=== Chancery ===
In the 1950s, Professor Nils Ahrbom was commissioned to design the first permanent embassy and he traveled to Tokyo in 1955 to inspect the site. He had with him a sketch that was approved by the National Swedish Board of Public Building (Byggnadsstyrelsen) and the Ministry for Foreign Affairs. In the garden there were some old and now culturally listed ginkgo trees that were allowed to control the location of the buildings. The first embassy was inaugurated in 1959. In step with the expansive economic development in Japan, land prices rose considerably in this central area, which was rather sparsely populated. In the mid-1980s, the embassy was contacted by the neighbor Mori Building Development Co., Ltd. which is one of Japan's largest real estate companies. They wanted to discuss a renewal of the area, make a more economical development with the integration of housing and offices according to Tokyo's city plan program. In order to implement this and still maintain the park character, certain interventions were required. The Swedish embassy was partly in the way of the intended new plan. Mori Building offered the Swedish state SEK 1.2 billion to take over a larger part of the garden, including the historic trees, to make this part of a park and a walkway adjacent to their planned office building and residential buildings. The agreement meant that the embassy had to be demolished and a new one built next to it. Professor Michael Granit, who had participated in the discussions on the city plan issue, was hired as the architect for the new embassy building. The architect Yoshito Katoh from Irie Miyake Architects was hired as a Japanese partner. All drawings were translated into Japanese, the dialogue worked well, but the most important partner for Granit for the design of the building, garden and terraces was the sculptor Sivert Lindblom. The 11,000 square meter facility was inaugurated in 1991.

Between the street and the entrances to the chancery, residence and accommodations, the courtyard is paved with small paving stones in a pattern that associates with hand fans. The vision was to create a contrast between the façade's red Vånga granite and the classic dark gray paving stone as a Swedish greeting, but the Japanese construction company did not have this reference and ordered domestic light gray stones. The chancery with the trade department and office for technical attachés is housed on the entrance level and on the 2nd floor. The environment is characterized by the Swedish standard that was developed in connection with the rebuilding of the Parliament House in Stockholm. In the conference room there is a decoration by Margareta Hallek in the form of a red textile. In contrast to it and the red stone of the façade, Kicken Ericson has created a carpet with a green and earth-colored pattern. A carpet which is used in all rooms with different results. The 25 staff accommodation units are located in the curved rising building on floors four to seven. Characteristic of all accommodations is the system of visible or invisible supporting pillars. Their task is to strengthen the structure to avoid the risk of collapse in the event of an earthquake. There is also a recreation facility with a pool. There is an upper and a lower basement which both contain different parts of the recreation facility. The pool is located in the basement and is surrounded by a teak deck. It has direct access to its own small garden. There is also a Japanese bath and a sauna. The garden feeling is enhanced by Åke Pallarp's marbled green murals and the trellis decoration on the tiled pillars. In the lower basement, in addition to the garage, there is also a squash court.

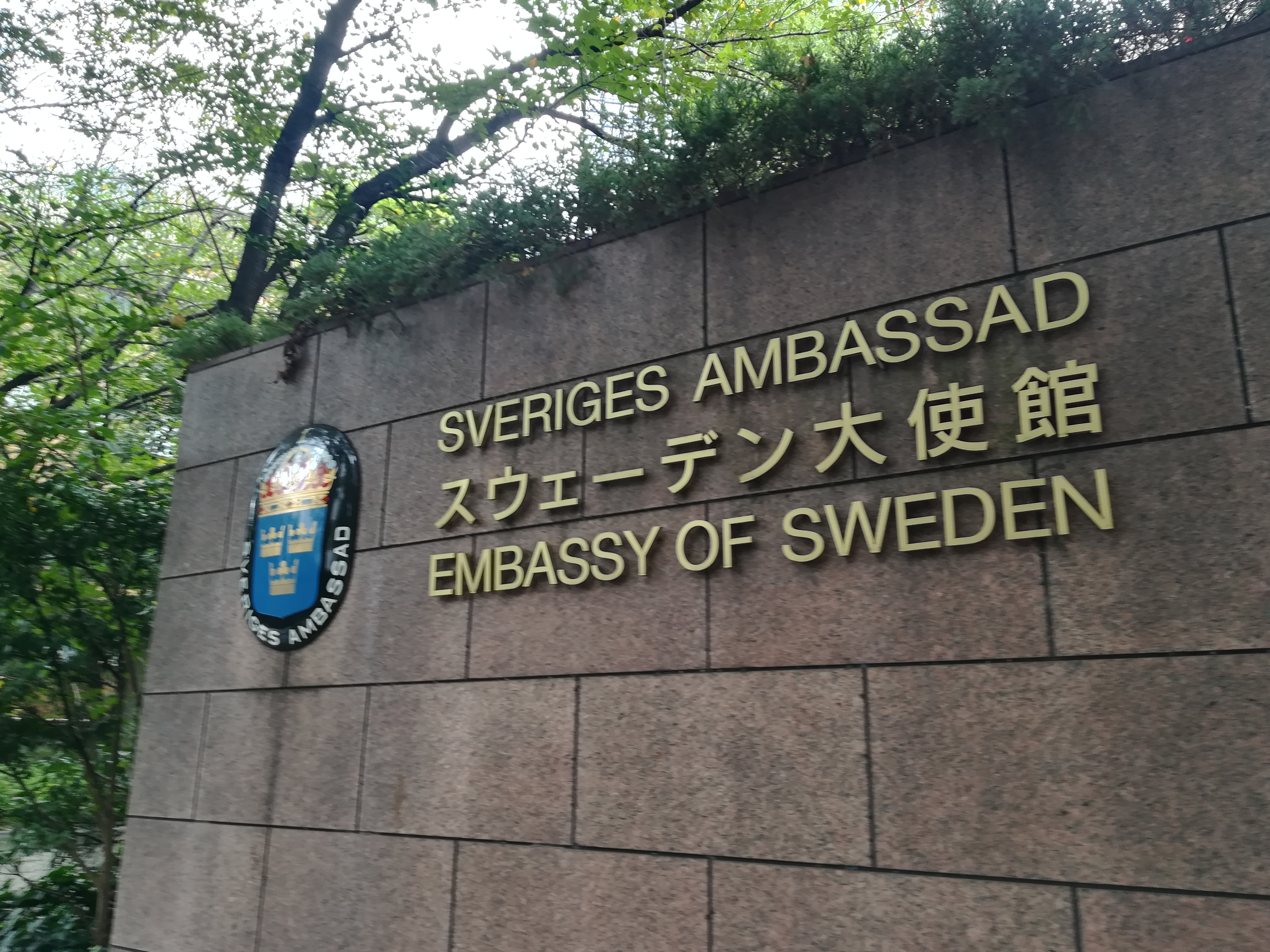
Sign at entrance

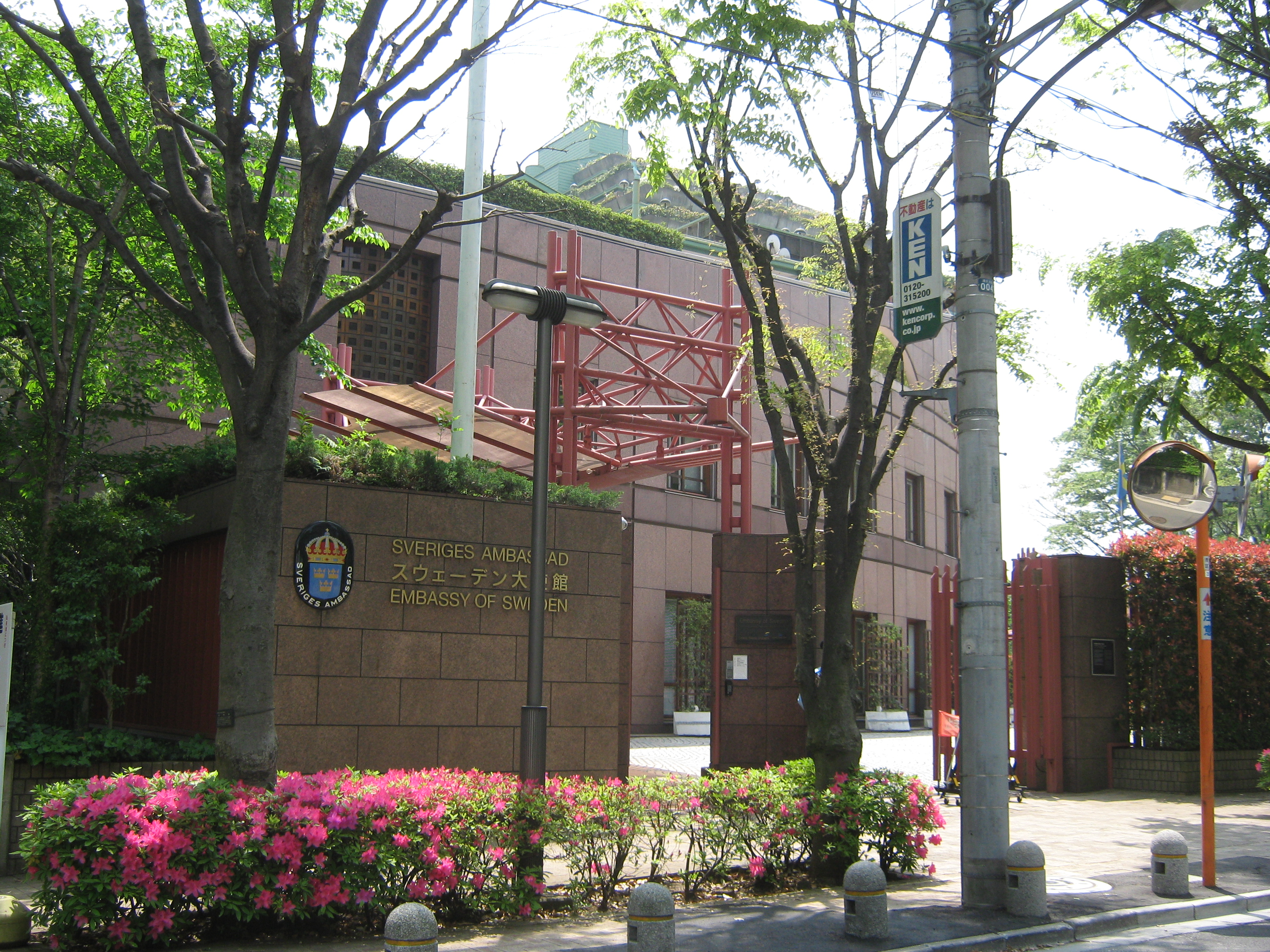
Entrance

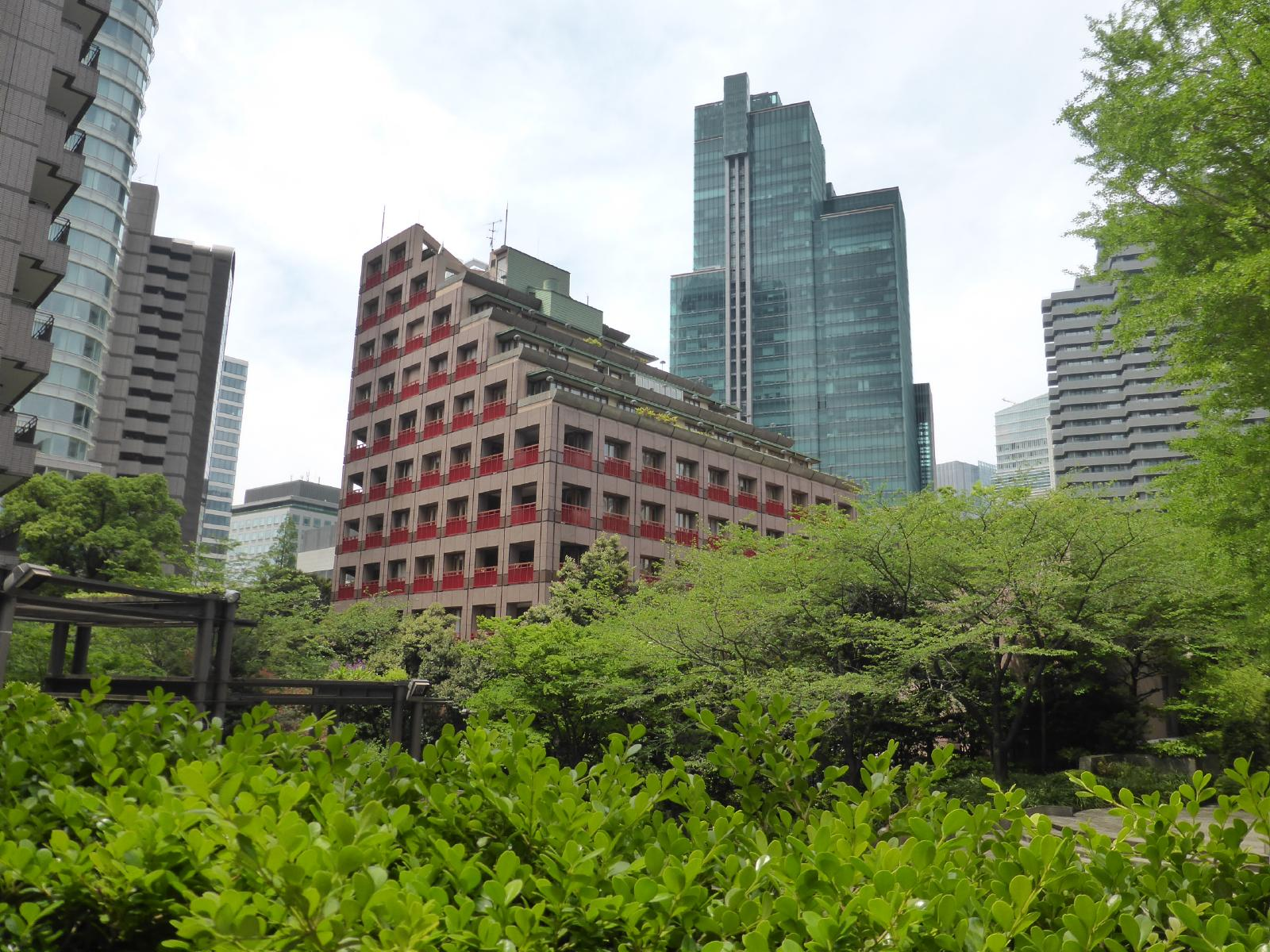
Staff apartments

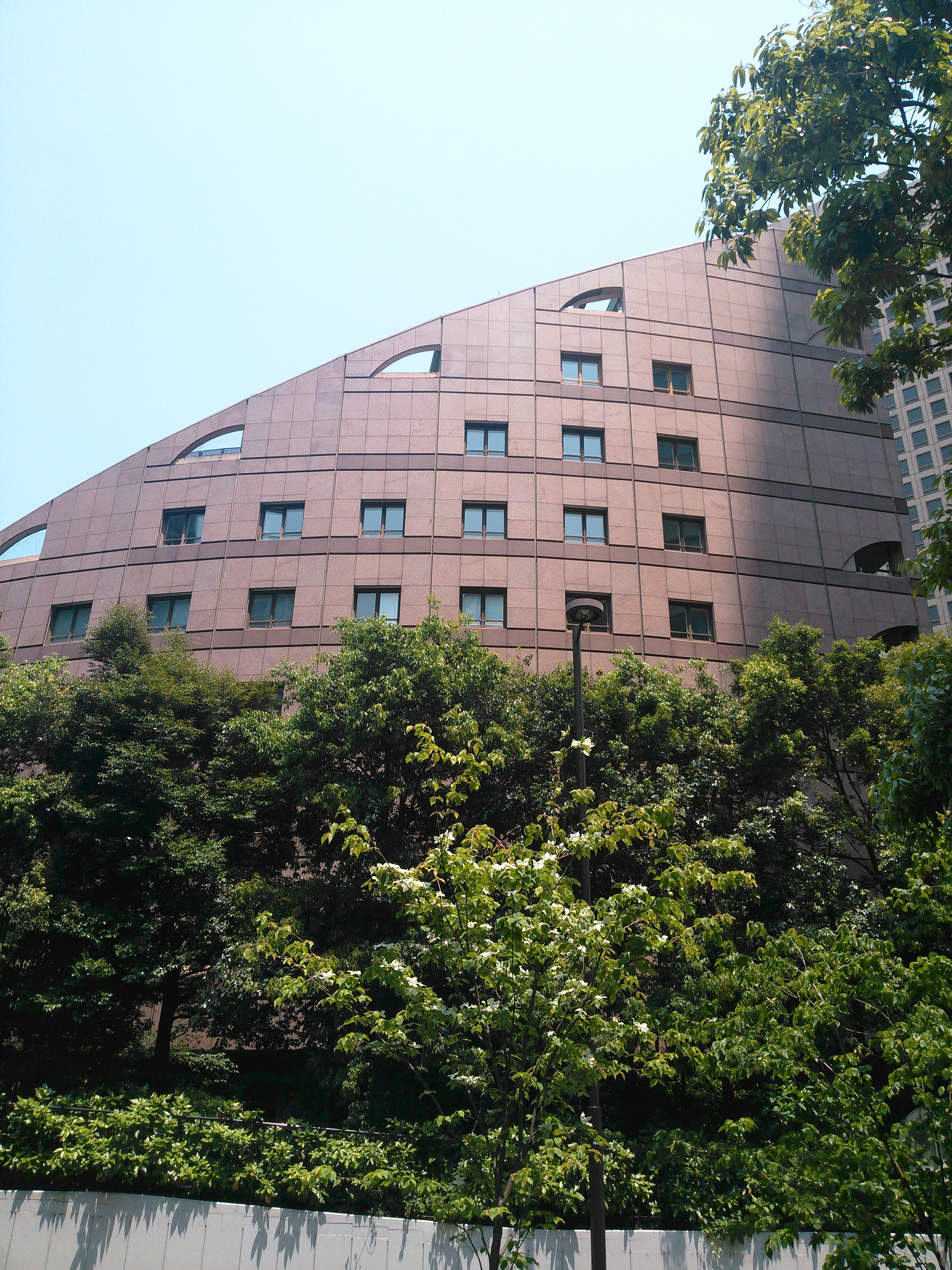
Façade

=== Residence ===
The residence is surrounded by a terrace garden which includes a small bridge over to a Japanese garden. The ambassadorial residence is located as a two-storey villa on top of the chancery's two floors. The boundary between the private quarters and the representative part is a counterclockwise curved staircase. Externally, the stairs is visible in the villa's oval roof section. Characteristic of all accommodations, including the residence, is the system of visible or invisible supporting pillars. Their task is to strengthen the structure to avoid the risk of collapse in the event of an earthquake. In the representative part of the residence, these pillars are built into the walls – in the walls of the square living room and in the four corners of the dining room. The residence is reached via a separate entrance where Axel Munthe's large textile Dalagång gives the visitor an introduction to an environment that summarizes seven decades of Swedish interior design art – from 1920s neoclassicism to the late 1980s postmodernism. The walls of the hallway are clad with curly birch panels and in its extension has a view through the atrium and the small dining room to the terrace. The salon has the same dimensions as the large salon at Ulriksdal Palace north of Stockholm. The interior designer Mats Jacobson has been responsible for the interior.

The almost square room has been furnished with three 'islands', four groups of seating arrangements gathered around low tables and between them a spacious space that through the large glass doors also incorporates the conservatory – the terrace. Kicken Ericson has specially composed a carpet for the room with a tight Trompe-l'œil pattern. The furniture otherwise follows a well-known pattern with soft sofas from Svenskt Tenn and tighter sofas by Lars and Pi Norinder as well as a modernized version of the so-called Gripsholmsstolen ("Gripsholm chair"). The art has a similar range from Einar Jolin's Stockholmsmotiv, Felix Hatz's Vissnande solrosor, Hans Viksten's Ljussegel to Barbro Lind's Segelbåt i vik. There is also a selection of contemporary glass art by well-known designers from Orrefors, Kosta Boda and Skruf. There is also a library with a cocklestove from Marieberg. Directly adjacent to the library is a white plastered hall with the curved stairs up to the private quarters. The large dining room is furnished with classic furniture designed by Lennart Jansson. A work of art by Peter Dahl with motifs by Carl Michael Bellman's "Movitz blåste en konsert" dominates the stage as well as selected parts from the lithograph series Bellman. Kicken Ericson has designed the carpets. The small dining room's two glass walls, one facing the terrace and the other facing the atrium, and Åke Pallarp's ceramic walls give a feeling of a glass veranda.

==== Bergman Exhibition Hall ====
The Bergman Exhibition Hall is located on the first floor, directly adjacent to the main entrance. The room is 138 m^{2} and has access to both kitchen and toilets. The Bergman Exhibition Hall has a maximum capacity of 200 people. Exhibitions are occasionally arranged in the exhibition hall in order to promote Swedish exports.

==== Alfred Nobel Auditorium ====
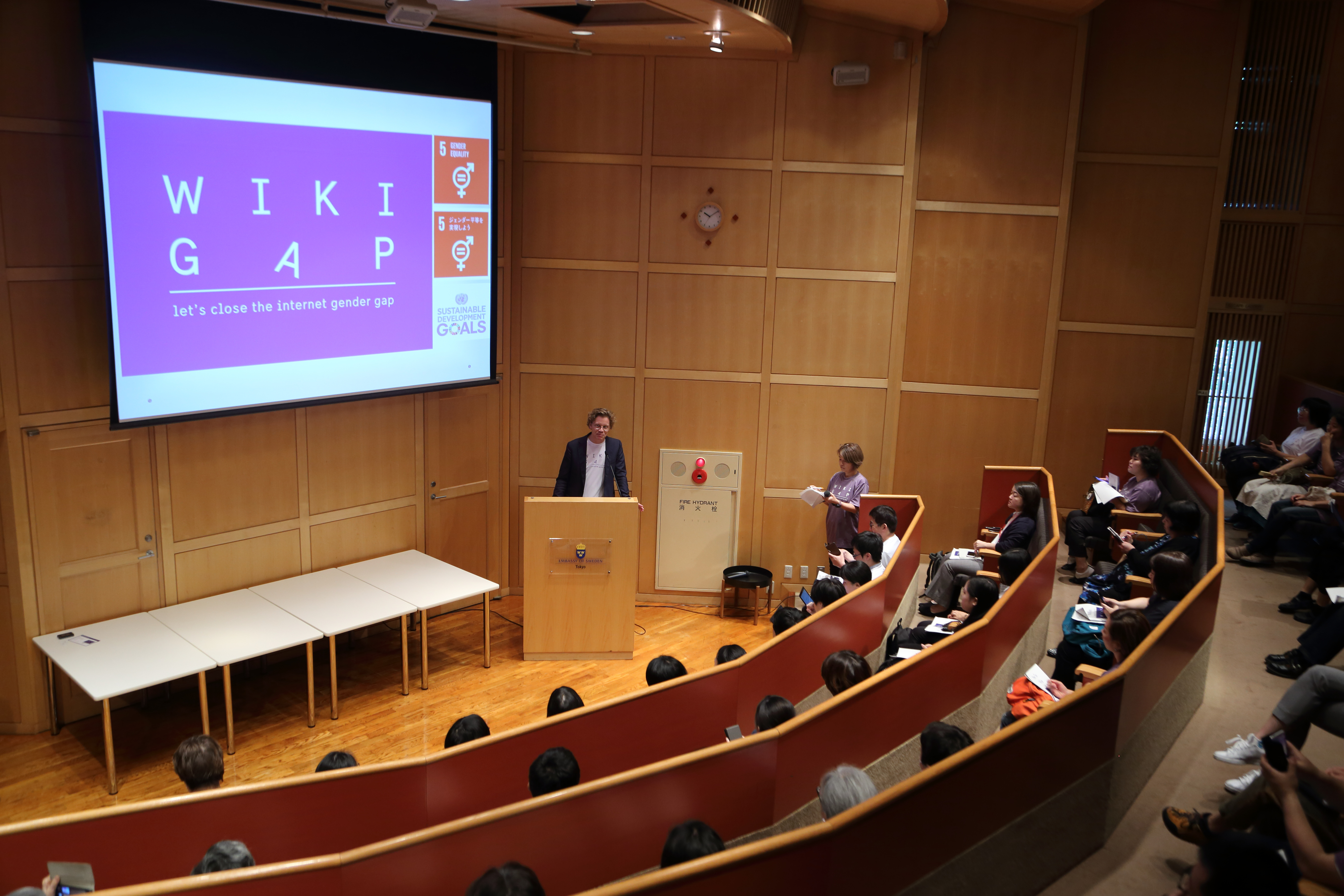
Alfred Nobel Auditorium

Next to the Bergman Exhibition Hall is the Alfred Nobel Auditorium. The room is designed as an amphitheater with 96 seats. The auditorium is equipped with a sound and projection system, a simultaneous interpretation booth and has access to toilets.

== See also ==
- Japan–Sweden relations
