= Lennart Klackenberg =

Swedish diplomat (1931–2026)

- Born: Stig Lennart Klackenberg; 27 February 1931; Stockholm, Sweden
- Died: 21 May 2026 (aged 95); Saltsjöbaden, Sweden
- Education: Lidingö läroverk
- Alma mater: Stockholm School of Economics; Stockholm University College
- Occupation: Diplomat
- Years active: 1962–1995
- Political party: Social Democratic Party
- Spouse: Berit Almkvist (m. 1954)
- Children: 2

Stig Lennart Klackenberg (27 February 1931 – 21 May 2026) was a Swedish diplomat and civil servant with a career spanning economic policy, development cooperation, and diplomacy. He began at the National Institute of Economic Research and later held senior posts at the Ministry of Finance, becoming deputy director and director, and serving on the Riksbank's Executive Board for Foreign Exchange. In 1970, he moved to the Ministry for Foreign Affairs as director-general with responsibility for international development cooperation. As state secretary and head of the Department for International Development Cooperation, he played a key role in reorganizing Sweden's development aid policy during a period of political debate over its direction.

After the change of government in 1976, he left his post and was retired in 1978 after declining several senior appointments. He subsequently returned to public service as secretary to the Brandt Commission and later headed the Swedish Import Office for Developing-Country Products. From the mid-1980s to 1995, Klackenberg served as ambassador to several Caribbean countries and later acted as Sweden's chief negotiator for the OECD's proposed Multilateral Agreement on Investment (MAI).

== Early life ==
Klackenberg was born on 27 February 1931 in Stockholm, Sweden, the son of Torsten Klackenberg, a lector at Enskede gymnasium. Lennart Klackenberg completed his upper secondary education on 9 May 1950 at Lidingö läroverk in Lidingö Municipality. Klackenberg received a Bachelor of Science in Economics (civilekonomexamen) from the Stockholm School of Economics on 19 November 1954. In May 1958, he completed a Bachelor of Arts degree at Stockholm University College.

== Career ==
Klackenberg was employed at the National Institute of Economic Research from 1954 to 1958. Between 1958 and 1963, he served as assistant secretary to the Stabilization Inquiry (stabiliseringsutredningen). In 1962, he was appointed budget secretary at the Ministry of Finance, and in 1965 he became deputy director (kansliråd) at the same ministry. That year he also became a member of the Executive Board for Foreign Exchange at the Riksbank. In 1967, he was promoted to director (departementsråd). In July 1970, he was appointed a member of the National Export Credits Guarantee Board, and in September of the same year he was named to the board of the Nordic Africa Institute, succeeding Ambassador Per Anger.

In the early 1970s, Lennart Klackenberg played a central role in the reorganization of Sweden's development aid policy. Following a rapid career within the Ministry of Finance—where he established himself as a skilled and influential civil servant—he was recruited to the Ministry for Foreign Affairs and appointed director-general (utrikesråd) in 1970 with responsibility for international development cooperation. At the same time, the main responsibility for development aid issues was consolidated within the ministry, strengthening its coordinating role. His subsequent appointment as state secretary and head of the ministry's Department for International Development Cooperation (Avdelningen för internationellt utvecklingssamarbete) attracted political attention. During the public debate, certain formulations in the Government Budget Bill were questioned, as they were seen to open the door to a more politically oriented aid policy. Critics feared that the previous principle of non-political development assistance was being abandoned. Klackenberg was associated in the debate with younger, reform-oriented officials within the ministry, which contributed to heightened scrutiny of his new position. Parliament ultimately reaffirmed the established principle that development assistance should remain non-political and decided that the state secretary would be subordinate to the state secretary for foreign affairs. Klackenberg thus assumed significant administrative responsibility, but within clearly defined political limits.

In 1975, it was revealed that Klackenberg, then state secretary at the Ministry for Foreign Affairs, had for a period lived under threat and police protection following an attempted extortion. Shortly after returning from a trip to North Vietnam, his family in Saltsjöbaden received a letter containing a cassette tape in which an English-speaking individual threatened to kill him unless he delivered diamonds and precious stones worth one million kronor. The extortionist provided detailed instructions regarding the specific stones required and how they were to be delivered to a designated location in Stockholm, and forbade any contact with the police. The family was immediately placed under protection, and the police monitored the specified delivery site, but no exchange ever took place. After a further threatening letter setting a new deadline, contact from the extortionist ceased. Police protection was later reduced, although security measures remained in place to ensure that the family could quickly receive assistance if necessary.

After the Social Democratic Party lost the general election in October 1976, Klackenberg and thirteen other state secretaries left their positions when the non-socialist parties assumed government power. In March 1977, it was reported that Klackenberg had remained in his post at the Ministry for Foreign Affairs for nearly six months after the election, despite the change of government. He was described as a remaining representative from the period of Sven Andersson and Gertrud Sigurdsen, retaining both his title and salary. At Arvfurstens palats, he worked on assignments related to the United Nations' agricultural fund and various inquiries. His continued presence, however, caused surprise and some irritation, and questions were raised as to why he had not stepped down following the political change. At the change of government, an informal agreement—the so-called "Palme list"—was handed over to the new administration. It contained nine names of individuals to whom the previous Social Democratic government had given certain assurances of new assignments after long service in the state administration. For these individuals, there was an understanding between the outgoing and incoming governments that they would remain in their posts until equivalent positions had been arranged. Despite his 22 years of state service, Klackenberg was not included on this list and was therefore not covered by the agreement.

In October 1977, after a year of attempts to find a new position for him, the new government decided instead to grant him a pension, at the age of 46. Representatives of the Social Democratic Party stated that they did not oppose this decision. Klackenberg himself, however, considered that he had been treated unfairly and demanded to retain his salary as state secretary until he was offered a position he could accept. The government, for its part, did not appear to regard him as suitable for such an appointment. According to Upsala Nya Tidning, the situation was difficult to understand from Klackenberg's perspective, and the newspaper suggested that it was unclear what he actually had to complain about. The protracted matter concerning Klackenberg, thus concluded with his retirement in accordance with the special regulations applicable to state secretaries. Not unexpectedly, Klackenberg declared himself dissatisfied with this outcome. He stated that he hoped no one believed him to be unwilling to work. Over the course of a year, he had declined offers to serve as ambassador to Hungary and Tanzania, two senior positions within the United Nations, the post of head of the Meteorological and Hydrological Institute, the directorship of the National Lottery (Svenska penninglotteriet), and a deputy director-general position at the Agency for Public Management. He was formally relieved of his duties and retired as of 1 January 1978. According to a government statement issued on 22 December 1977, he had been offered six senior posts and had declined them all, arguing that his expertise in international economics would not have been utilized. Following these events, some commentators, including within his own party, began to view him as a liability.

Klackenberg served as secretary to the Brandt Commission from 1978 to 1979, as an investigative secretary for the Social Democratic parliamentary group from 1981 to 1982. Klackenberg, described in the press as the most difficult state secretary on the Swedish labor market to place, was eventually appointed by the government, in December 1982, as head of the Swedish Import Office for Developing-Country Products (Importkontoret för u-landsprodukter, Improd), where the task was to promote imports to Sweden from developing countries in order to increase their export revenues and thereby contribute to their development.

In 1983, he was appointed ambassador within the Ministry for Foreign Affairs. In 1986, Klackenberg was appointed ambassador-at-large for the countries in and around the Caribbean Sea, while remaining based at the Ministry for Foreign Affairs in Stockholm. From 1986 to 1995, he served as ambassador to Port-au-Prince, Santo Domingo, Paramaribo, St. George's, Castries, Belmopan, and Kingstown. He also served as ambassador to Kingston from 1987 to 1995 and to St. John's, Roseau, and Basseterre from 1992 to 1995. Klackenberg subsequently served as Sweden's chief negotiator for the Multilateral Agreement on Investment (MAI), a proposed multilateral agreement intended to regulate investment conditions among the 29 member countries of the OECD.

== Personal life ==
In August 1952, he became engaged to Berit Maria Almkvist (born 1929) of Lund, the daughter of insurance director William Almkvist and his wife, née Frisch. They were married in Paris on 7 July 1954. They had two daughters: the author Tove Klackenberg (born 1956) and Åse (born 1958).

Klackenberg was an active parachutist for 37 years, continuing the sport until the age of 88.

== Death ==
Klackenberg died on 21 May 2026 in Saltsjöbaden, Stockholm County.

== Awards and decorations ==
- (Estonia) 4th Class of the Order of the Cross of Terra Mariana (5 February 2004)

Diplomatic posts
Preceded by Erik Tennander	Ambassador of Sweden to Haiti; 1986–1995	Succeeded by Hans Linton
Preceded by Erik Tennander	Ambassador of Sweden to the Dominican Republic; 1986–1995	Succeeded by Hans Linton
Preceded by Erik Tennander	Ambassador of Sweden to Suriname; 1986–1995	Succeeded by Magnus Nordbäck
Preceded by Erik Tennander	Ambassador of Sweden to Grenada; 1986–1995	Succeeded by Hans Linton
Preceded by Erik Tennander	Ambassador of Sweden to Saint Lucia; 1986–1995	Succeeded by Hans Linton
Preceded by Erik Tennander	Ambassador of Sweden to Guyana; 1986–1995	Succeeded by Magnus Nordbäck
Preceded by Erik Tennander	Ambassador of Sweden to Belize; 1986–1995	Succeeded by Staffan Wrigstad
Preceded by None	Ambassador of Sweden to Saint Vincent and the Grenadines; 1986–1995	Succeeded by Hans Linton
Preceded by Jan Ståhl	Ambassador of Sweden to Jamaica; 1987–1995	Succeeded by Hans Linton
Preceded by None	Ambassador of Sweden to Antigua and Barbuda; 1992–1995	Succeeded by Hans Linton
Preceded by None	Ambassador of Sweden to Dominica; 1992–1995	Succeeded by Hans Linton
Preceded by None	Ambassador of Sweden to Saint Kitts and Nevis; 1992–1995	Succeeded by Hans Linton
