= Gunnar Dryselius =

Swedish diplomat (1907–1982)

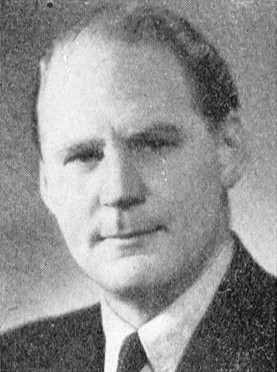
- Born: Gunnar Daniel Dryselius; 2 May 1907; Sundsvall, Sweden
- Died: 16 September 1982 (aged 75); Cascais, Portugal
- Education: Uppsala University; Stockholm University College
- Occupation: Diplomat
- Years active: 1933–1970
- Spouse: Anna af Petersens (m. 1935)
- Children: 3
- Relatives: Gösta af Petersens (brother-in-law)

Gunnar Daniel Dryselius (2 May 1907 – 16 September 1982) was a Swedish diplomat. Dryselius began his diplomatic career in 1933 and held early postings in London, Prague, and Buenos Aires, where he played a crucial role in securing vital supplies for Sweden during World War II. In 1944, he returned to Stockholm to lead the Latin American Bureau, planning the postwar resumption of trade with South and Central America. After a brief mission in Gdańsk, he spent over a decade in the United States, notably as consul general in Houston, where he promoted Swedish industry and culture in a rapidly growing region. From 1958 to 1963, he served as envoy in Venezuela and later as ambassador to Portugal during a period of diplomatic tension over Sweden’s support for African independence movements. Despite propaganda attacks and internal criticism, Dryselius handled these challenges with composure and tact, earning the respect even of Portuguese leaders. He retired from active service in 1970.

== Early life ==
Dryselius was born on 2 May 1907, in Sundsvall, Sweden, the son of district clerk (häradsskrivare) Victor Dryselius and his wife Augusta (née Mattsson). He completed his secondary education in Örebro in 1926, earned a Bachelor of Arts degree from Uppsala University in 1928, and received a Candidate of Law degree from Stockholm University College in 1933.

== Career ==
Dryselius began his diplomatic career as an attaché at the Swedish Ministry for Foreign Affairs in 1933. He was soon posted to London in 1934, then to Prague from 1935 to 1936, and served as chargé d'affaires in Buenos Aires during 1937–1938 and again from 1939 to 1940. He was appointed second secretary there in 1940 and remained until 1944. While in Buenos Aires, Dryselius played a key role in securing vital imports for Sweden, which was cut off by the war, using neutral shipping routes from South America. In 1944, during the final year of the war, he returned to Stockholm as first secretary at the Ministry for Foreign Affairs. He was appointed head of the newly established Latin American Bureau in the Trade Department, tasked with planning the resumption of Sweden’s trade relations with South and Central America as soon as westbound routes reopened.

After a brief assignment in Gdańsk in 1945—where he was sent to ensure that essential coal deliveries from Poland to Swedish industry were fulfilled—he was appointed director (byråchef) at the ministry in 1946. That same year, he was posted once more to the United States, where he remained for over a decade. He served first as consul in New York City in 1947, and from 1950 to 1958, as consul and head of the newly established trade consulate in Houston, Texas—an initiative proposed by Ambassador Erik Boheman. He was granted the title of Consul General in 1953. In this role, which covered the rapidly growing Texas region and surrounding states, Dryselius made a pioneering contribution. Through trade fairs, exhibitions of Swedish products, and public lectures on Sweden at universities, chambers of commerce, Rotary clubs, and more, he successfully raised Sweden’s profile in an increasingly important region for both Swedish industry and cultural exchange.

From 1958 to 1963, he served as envoy in Caracas, Venezuela, with dual accreditation to Havana, Port-au-Prince, and Santo Domingo. Dryselius was then appointed ambassador to Portugal, serving from 1964 to 1970 during a tense period marked by Sweden’s outspoken support for African independence movements against Portuguese colonial rule. His time in Lisbon was defined by rising tensions with the Portuguese regime, which responded with aggressive propaganda portraying Sweden as neo-colonial and morally decadent. Dryselius diplomatically countered this narrative, filing formal complaints and maintaining professional composure despite receiving offensive anonymous letters.

He also faced criticism from Sweden for following diplomatic protocol, such as visiting dictator Salazar in hospital, and for handling sensitive aid shipments. Despite occasional disagreements with the Swedish Ministry for Foreign Affairs, Dryselius was tactful and cautious in expressing his concerns, often using irony or posing rhetorical questions. His diplomatic skill earned respect even from Portuguese Prime Minister Marcelo Caetano, who acknowledged that crises had been mitigated thanks to Dryselius' personal conduct.

He was placed on reserve in 1970, concluding his active diplomatic career.

== Personal life ==
In 1935, Dryselius married Anna af Petersens (1912–1991), the daughter of forester Gustaf af Petersens and Baroness Märta (née Rappe). They had three children: Anita (born 1937), Gunilla (born 1939), and Jan (born 1942).

Through his wife Anna, he was a brother-in-law to the diplomat Gösta af Petersens.

== Death ==
Dryselius was afflicted by an illness during his time in the United States—one that would cast a long shadow over the rest of his professional life and ultimately claim it. He died on 16 May 1982. His funeral was held on 28 September 1982, at Solna Old Church in Stockholm. He was buried on 14 October 1982, at Nikolai Cemetery in Örebro.

== Awards and decorations ==
- (Sweden) Commander 1st Class of the Order of the Polar Star (11 November 1966)
- (Sweden) Commander of the Order of the Polar Star (10 November 1962)
- (Sweden) Knight of the Order of the Polar Star (1949)
- (Portugal) Grand Cross of the Order of Prince Henry (16 May 1975)
- (Argentina) Commander of the Order of May
- (Denmark) Commander of the Order of the Dannebrog
- (Mexico) Commander of the Order of the Aztec Eagle (21 March 1950)
- (Czechoslovakia) Knight of the Order of the White Lion

Diplomatic posts
Preceded by None	Consul/Consul General of Sweden to Houston; 1949–1957	Succeeded by Karl Henrik Andersson
Preceded by Carl-Herbert Borgenstierna	Envoy/Ambassador of Sweden to Venezuela; 1958–1963	Succeeded by Knut Bernström
Preceded by Carl-Herbert Borgenstierna	Envoy/Ambassador of Sweden to Haiti; 1958–1963	Succeeded by Knut Bernström
Preceded by Carl-Herbert Borgenstierna	Envoy/Ambassador of Sweden to the Dominican Republic; 1958–1963	Succeeded by Knut Bernström
Preceded by Carl-Herbert Borgenstierna	Envoy of Sweden to Cuba; 1958–1963	Succeeded by Tord Göransson
Preceded by Alexis Aminoff	Ambassador of Sweden to Portugal; 1964–1970	Succeeded by Karl Fredrik Almqvist
