= Sten Ask =

Swedish diplomat (born 1943)

- Born: Sten Sture Ask; 22 January 1943 (age 83); Stockholm, Sweden
- Education: Stockholm University; Stockholm School of Economics
- Occupation: Diplomat
- Years active: 1961–2010
- Political party: Social Democratic Party
- Spouse: Cecilia Landahl (m. 1985)
- Children: 1

Sten Sture Ask (born 22 January 1943) is a retired Swedish diplomat. After earning a Bachelor of Arts from Stockholm University in 1969, he joined the Ministry for Foreign Affairs in 1970. During the 1970s he combined government service with local and regional political roles in Nynäshamn and the Stockholm County Council. In 1980 he began an international diplomatic career, serving at Sweden's delegation to the OECD in Paris and at the Permanent Mission to the United Nations in New York City.

He later held senior diplomatic posts including chargé d'affaires in Vientiane (1984–1987) and minister at the Swedish embassy in Vienna and Sweden's representation to the UN organizations in Vienna (1987–1992). After senior roles at the Ministry for Foreign Affairs, he served as Sweden's ambassador to Bulgaria from 1998 to 2003. From 2004 to 2010 he was Sweden's ambassador-at-large for the Caribbean region, accredited to several countries including Haiti, Jamaica, and the Dominican Republic.

== Early life ==
Ask was born on 22 January 1943 in Stockholm, Sweden, the son of Carl Ask and his wife Vanda (née Kaufelt). He grew up at Fredsgatan 11 in Nynäshamn with his parents and siblings during the 1940s and 1950s.

Ask received a Bachelor of Arts degree from Stockholm University in 1969, was a doctoral student in economics at the Stockholm School of Economics from 1969 to 1970, with the aim of becoming a professor of economics or an ambassador.

== Career ==
Ask worked as a cost accountant at the Televerket in Nynäshamn from 1961 to 1964. In 1969 he was an assistant at the National Institute of Economic Research. He then served as an administrative officer (kanslisekreterare) at the Ministry for Foreign Affairs from 1970 to 1974. During 1971–1980 he also held municipal political positions in Nynäshamn Municipality, including vice chairman of the local school board and chairman of the Nynäshamn Social Democratic association. He held political office in the Stockholm County Council from 1973 to 1997 and worked there as a desk officer (departementssekreterare) from 1975 to 1979. In 1980 he became first embassy secretary at the OECD delegation in Paris, and from 1980 to 1983 he served as counsellor at Sweden's Permanent Mission to the United Nations in New York City. During his time in New York he was a colleague of the Norwegian spy Arne Treholt.

He served as counsellor with special duties at the Ministry for Foreign Affairs from 1983 to 1984, and then as chargé d'affaires with the rank of minister at the Swedish embassy in Vientiane from 1984 to 1987. From 1987 to 1992 he was minister at the embassy in Vienna and at Sweden's Permanent Representation to the UN organizations in Vienna. He was a fellow at the Weatherhead Center for International Affairs from 1992 to 1993, minister with special duties at the Ministry for Foreign Affairs from 1993 to 1994, and director (departementsråd) at the Ministry for Foreign Affairs from 1995 to 1998. He was then appointed ambassador to Sofia, serving from 1998 to 2003.

In 2004, Ask was appointed ambassador-at-large for the countries in and around the Caribbean Sea, while remaining based at the Ministry for Foreign Affairs in Stockholm. From 2004 to 2010, he served as ambassador to Port-au-Prince, Santo Domingo, St. George's, Castries, Kingstown, Kingston, Roseau, Basseterre, Bridgetown, St. John's, Georgetown, and Port of Spain. Alongside this assignment, Ask also headed the Secretariat for the Dag Hammarskjöld Centenary in 2005.

His final years as ambassador before retirement were marked, among other things, by the 2010 Haiti earthquake. Together with Professor Mats Lundahl at the Stockholm School of Economics, he has written several articles about Haiti's future after the earthquake.

== Personal life ==
In 1985, Ask married licensed psychologist Cecilia Landahl (born 1949), the daughter of divisional director Lennart Landahl and Ulla (née Hansson). They had a son, born in 1987.

== Bibliography ==
- Ask, Sten; Mark-Jungkvist, Anna, eds. (2005). Freden som äventyr: Dag Hammarskjöld och FN:s framtid [The adventure of peace: Dag Hammarskjöld and the future of the UN] (in Swedish). Stockholm: Atlantis. ISBN 9173530646. SELIBR 9822699.
- Ask, Sten; Mark-Jungkvist, Anna, eds. (2005). The adventure of peace: Dag Hammarskjöld and the future of the UN (1st ed.). New York: Palgrave Macmillan. ISBN 1403974314. SELIBR 10016130.
- Ask, Sten; Mark-Jungkvist, Anna; Urquhart, Brian; Khrushchev, Sergei; Mitsuhashi, Midori, eds. (2013). Sekai heiwa eno bōken ryokō: dagu hamāshorudo to kokuren no mirai [World Peace: A Boundary for the Future] (in Japanese). Tokyo: Shinhyōron. ISBN 978-4-7948-0945-2. SELIBR 18317098.

Diplomatic posts
Preceded by Bertil Lund	Ambassador of Sweden to Bulgaria; 1998–2003	Succeeded by Bertil Roth
Preceded by Hans Linton	Ambassador of Sweden to Haiti; 2004–2010	Succeeded by Claes Hammar
Preceded by Hans Linton	Ambassador of Sweden to the Dominican Republic; 2004–2010	Succeeded by Claes Hammar
Preceded by Hans Linton	Ambassador of Sweden to Grenada; 2004–2010	Succeeded by ?
Preceded by Hans Linton	Ambassador of Sweden to Saint Lucia; 2004–2010	Succeeded by Claes Hammar
Preceded by Hans Linton	Ambassador of Sweden to Saint Vincent and the Grenadines; 2004–2010	Succeeded by Claes Hammar
Preceded by Hans Linton	Ambassador of Sweden to Jamaica; 2004–2010	Succeeded by Claes Hammar
Preceded by Hans Linton	Ambassador of Sweden to Dominica; 2004–2010	Succeeded by Claes Hammar
Preceded by Hans Linton	Ambassador of Sweden to Saint Kitts and Nevis; 2004–2010	Succeeded by Claes Hammar
Preceded by Hans Linton	Ambassador of Sweden to Barbados; 2004–2010	Succeeded by Claes Hammar
Preceded by Hans Linton	Ambassador of Sweden to Antigua and Barbuda; 2004–2010	Succeeded by Claes Hammar
Preceded by Hans Linton	Ambassador of Sweden to Guyana; 2004–2010	Succeeded by Claes Hammar
Preceded by Hans Linton	Ambassador of Sweden to Trinidad and Tobago; 2004–2010	Succeeded by Claes Hammar
