= Agency for Financial and Public Management =

Swedish government agency

The Agency for Financial and Public Management (Note: Statskontoret has earlier been translated into the following: the Swedish Agency for Public Management, the Swedish Agency for Administrative Development or the Swedish Administration Development Agency.) (Swedish: Statskontoret) is a central government agency under the Ministry of Finance in Sweden. On 1 July 1998, the agency was established as the Swedish Financial Management Agency (Swedish: Ekonomistyrningsverket). However, on 1 January 2026, the former Agency for Public Management was merged into Ekonomistyrningsverket and the agency then changed its name to Statskontoret.

== Purpose ==
The agency works to promote a well-functioning and efficient system of central government administration and sound management of public funds. Its responsibilities include:

- Analysing and evaluating central government governance and activities.
- Promoting good administrative practice and anti-corruption efforts.
- Developing central government financial management and reporting.
- Developing the government-wide IT system Hermes.
- Producing forecasts for the central government budget and public finances.
- Functions as the Swedish national audit authority of EU funds.

== See also ==
- Private
  - List of Swedish companies
  - Stockholm Stock Exchange
- Government
  - Government finance
    - Central bank ("Sveriges Riksbank")
    - Currency ("krona", "kronor" in plural)
    - List of Swedish government enterprises
    - Monetary policy of Sweden
    - Ministry of Finance
    - Swedish National Institute of Economic Research
  - Spending
    - Social security in Sweden
  - Agencies, unions
    - Government agencies in Sweden
    - Confederation of Swedish Enterprise (Svenskt Näringsliv)
    - Swedish Confederation of Professional Associations (SACO)
    - Swedish Confederation of Professional Employees (TCO)
    - Swedish Trade Union Confederation (LO)
  - Energy policy
    - Nuclear power in Sweden
    - Proposed Oil phase-out in Sweden

Other links

- Economy of Europe
- European Union
- History of copper currency in Sweden
