= Carl-Herbert Borgenstierna =

Swedish diplomat (1902–1981)

- Born: Carl-Herbert Gotthard Strang Borgenstierna; 23 November 1902; Stockholm, Sweden
- Died: 1 September 1981 (aged 78); Madrid, Spain
- Education: Lund University
- Occupation: Diplomat
- Years active: 1927–1968
- Spouse: Anita Knutzen (m. 1937)
- Children: 2

Carl-Herbert Gotthard Strang Borgenstierna (23 November 1902 – 1 September 1981) was a Swedish diplomat. Born into the noble Borgenstierna family in Stockholm, he grew up in Ystad and earned a Bachelor of Laws degree from Lund University in 1927. He entered the Swedish diplomatic service the same year, serving in London, Paris, Berlin, Rome, Washington, D.C., Bucharest, and Madrid.

During the years following the Spanish Civil War, he helped secure the release of Swedish citizens imprisoned in Spain. Borgenstierna later held senior diplomatic posts in Latin America, including ambassador to Buenos Aires (1958–1963) and envoy to Asunción, as well as ambassador to Madrid (1964–1968). He participated in trade, aviation, and visa negotiations, and promoted Swedish culture abroad, supporting book donations, exhibitions, and the establishment of Casa Suecia in Buenos Aires.

== Early life ==
Carl-Herbert was born into the noble Borgenstierna family in Stockholm, Sweden on 23 November 1902. He grew up in Ystad with two younger brothers and two younger sisters. His father, Carl-Robert Borgenstierna (born 1874), was the managing director and brewmaster at Klosterbryggeriet in Ystad and a member of the city council there. His mother, Anna Catharina Danielsson (born 1877), was the daughter of Gotthard Danielsson, managing director of the Årnäs glassworks, and Olivia Thorstensson. He was a cousin of the theologian and Bishop of the Diocese of Karlstad, Gert Borgenstierna (1911–1989).

Borgenstierna completed his secondary school leaving examination on 4 June 1920 and enrolled at Lund University the same year. He received a Bachelor of Laws degree from Lund University in 1927.

== Career ==
Borgenstierna served at the Consulate General in London in 1927 and at the Swedish legation in Paris from 1928 to 1930. Between 1930 and 1935, he worked as an attaché at the Ministry for Foreign Affairs in Stockholm, with postings in London, Berlin, Rome, Washington, D.C., and Bucharest. In 1935, he was appointed second legation secretary in Bucharest and Sofia. He became second secretary at the Ministry for Foreign Affairs in 1938 and first legation secretary in Madrid from 1939 to 1943.

During the chaotic period in Spain following the end of the Civil War and at the beginning of the Second World War, Borgenstierna succeeded in persuading strictly rule-bound police officials to release Swedish citizens who had ended up in Spanish prisons. These included Swedes who had fought on the Republican (government) side in the Spanish Civil War, as well as seamen whose ships had been torpedoed outside Spanish waters.

He served as chargé d'affaires ad interim in Lisbon in 1942, was appointed legation counsellor in Buenos Aires in 1944, and became chargé d'affaires in Montevideo in 1949. In 1953, he was appointed envoy to Caracas, Havana, Ciudad Trujillo, and Port-au-Prince. From 1958 to 1963, he served as ambassador to Buenos Aires and envoy to Asunción. He participated in trade negotiations with Argentina, Cuba, Spain, and Uruguay; in aviation negotiations with Argentina and Uruguay; and in visa negotiations with Argentina and Paraguay.

During his time in South America, he made significant contributions not only in the field of trade policy but also in cultural affairs. He organized large-scale donations of Swedish books to Argentina, played an active role in the establishment of Casa Suecia in Buenos Aires, and was deeply involved in promoting Swedish arts and crafts through exhibitions for South American audiences. He subsequently served as ambassador to Madrid from 1964 to 1968. He later served as Chairman of Atlas Copco S.A. Española, honorary chairman of Ciudalcampo, and honorary member of the City Council of Málaga.

== Personal life ==
In 1937, Borgenstierna married Anita Knutzen (1911–2000). They had two children: Carl-Robert "Carlos" (1941–2020) and Carl-Eric (1944–2017).

In an obituary, Borgenstierna was described as a man who "took regular fencing lessons, loved spending time in nature, and practiced yoga. He was extremely cultivated—a Renaissance figure—immensely well read, and extraordinarily knowledgeable about art and cultural pursuits."

== Death ==
Borgenstierna died on 1 September 1981 in Madrid, Spain. A memorial service was held at the Resurrection Chapel (Uppståndelsens kapell) in Ystad on 5 September. He was buried on 5 September 1981 in the family grave at Ystad Old Cemetery, in his hometown of Ystad.

== Awards and decorations ==
=== Swedish ===
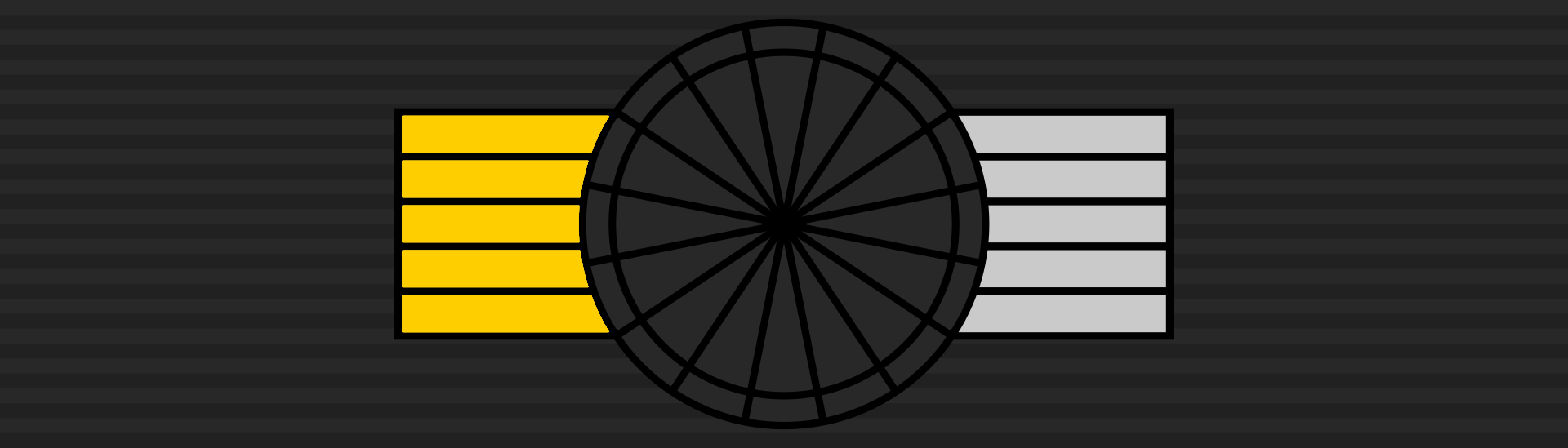
- (Sweden) Commander 1st Class of the Order of the Polar Star (26 November 1964)
- (Sweden) Commander of the Order of the Polar Star (28 November 1959)
- (Sweden) Knight of the Order of the Polar Star (1949)

=== Foreign ===
- (Argentina) Grand Cross of the Order of the Liberator General San Martín
- (Cuba) Grand Cross of the Order of Carlos Manuel de Céspedes
- (Haiti) Grand Cross of the National Order of Honour and Merit
- (Peru) Grand Officer of the Order of Merit for Distinguished Services
- (Spain) Grand Officer of the Order of Isabella the Catholic
- (Venezuela) Grand Officer of the Order of the Liberator
- (Tsardom of Bulgaria (1908–1946)) Officer of the Order of Civil Merit
- (Kingdom of Romania) Officer of the Order of the Crown of Romania

Diplomatic posts
Preceded by Herbert Ribbing as Envoy	Charge d'affaires of Sweden to Uruguay; 1949–1953	Succeeded by Gösta Hedengren
Preceded by Fritz Stackelberg	Envoy of Sweden to Venezuela; 1953–1957	Succeeded by Gunnar Dryselius
Preceded by Fritz Stackelberg	Envoy of Sweden to Cuba; 1953–1957	Succeeded by Gunnar Dryselius
Preceded by Fritz Stackelberg	Envoy of Sweden to the Dominican Republic; 1953–1957	Succeeded by Gunnar Dryselius
Preceded by Fritz Stackelberg	Envoy of Sweden to Haiti; 1953–1957	Succeeded by Gunnar Dryselius
Preceded by Herbert Ribbing	Ambassador of Sweden to Argentina; 1958–1963	Succeeded by Östen Lundborg
Preceded by Herbert Ribbing	Ambassador of Sweden to Paraguay; 1958–1963	Succeeded by Östen Lundborg
Preceded by Herbert Ribbing	Ambassador of Sweden to Spain; 1964–1968	Succeeded by Jan Stenström
