= List of ambassadors of Sweden to Belize =

Ambassador of Sweden to Belize
- Lesser coat of arms of the Kingdom of Sweden
- Incumbent; Maria Velasco since 2025
- Ministry for Foreign Affairs; Swedish Embassy, Caribbean
- Style: His or Her Excellency (formal); Mr. or Madam Ambassador (informal)
- Reports to: Minister for Foreign Affairs
- Seat: Stockholm, Sweden (Note: The Swedish ambassador to Belize is resident in Stockholm, Sweden.)
- Appointer: Government of Sweden
- Term length: No fixed term
- Inaugural holder: Erik Tennander
- Formation: 1982

The Ambassador of Sweden to Belize (known formally as the Ambassador of the Kingdom of Sweden to Belize) is the official representative of the government of Sweden to the governor-general of Belize and government of Belize. Since Sweden does not have an embassy in Belmopan, Sweden's ambassador to Belize is resident in Stockholm, Sweden.

== History ==
In a report on the reorganization of the Ministry for Foreign Affairs in early January 1921, the experts endorsed a proposal from the Swedish chargé d'affaires in Mexico City to extend the mission's area of responsibility to include the Central American states, British Honduras, as well as Cuba, Venezuela, Colombia, Haiti, and San Domingo, along with the British, French, Dutch, and American possessions in the West Indies.

In 1973, British Honduras was officially renamed Belize. Belize gained independence on 21 September 1981. Sweden and Belize established diplomatic relations on 17 November 1982. The same year, Erik Tennander was appointed ambassador-at-large, based in Stockholm, for the countries of the Caribbean region, including Belize. In 1997, responsibility for accreditation to Belize was transferred to the Swedish Ambassador to Guatemala, who was concurrently accredited to Belize from Guatemala City. In 2022, accreditation to Belize was transferred back to the Stockholm-based ambassador-at-large responsible for the countries of the Caribbean region.

== List of representatives ==
Name	Period	Title	Resident / Concurrent accreditation	Notes	Presented credentials	Ref
Erik Tennander	1982–1985	Ambassador	Resident in Stockholm			
Lennart Klackenberg	1986–1995	Ambassador	Resident in Stockholm			
–	1996–1996	Ambassador		Vacant		
Staffan Wrigstad	1997–2000	Ambassador	Resident in Guatemala City			
Maria Leissner	2000–2004	Ambassador	Resident in Guatemala City			
Eivor Halkjaer	2004–2006	Ambassador	Resident in Guatemala City			
Ewa Werner-Dahlin	2006–2010	Ambassador	Resident in Guatemala City		22 February 2007	
Michael Frühling	2010–2014	Ambassador	Resident in Guatemala City			
Georg Andrén	2017–2017	Ambassador	Resident in Guatemala City		3 April 2017	
Anders Kompass	2017–2020	Ambassador	Resident in Guatemala City		20 May 2019	
Hans Magnusson	2020–2022	Ambassador	Resident in Guatemala City			
Anders Bengtcén	2022–2025	Ambassador	Resident in Stockholm		23 September 2022	
Maria Velasco	2025–present	Ambassador	Resident in Stockholm		17 September 2025	
