= List of ambassadors of Sweden to Trinidad and Tobago =

Ambassador of Sweden to Trinidad and Tobago
- Lesser coat of arms of the Kingdom of Sweden
- Incumbent; Maria Velasco since 2025
- Ministry for Foreign Affairs
- Style: His or Her Excellency (formal); Mr. or Madam Ambassador (informal)
- Reports to: Minister for Foreign Affairs
- Seat: Stockholm, Sweden (Note: Swedish ambassador to Trinidad and Tobago is based in Stockholm, Sweden.)
- Appointer: Government of Sweden
- Term length: No fixed term
- Inaugural holder: Otto Rathsman
- Formation: 1967

The Ambassador of Sweden to Trinidad and Tobago (known formally as the Ambassador of the Kingdom of Sweden to the Republic of Trinidad and Tobago) is the official representative of the government of Sweden to the president of Trinidad and Tobago and government of Trinidad and Tobago. Since Sweden does not have an embassy in Port of Spain, Sweden's ambassador to Trinidad and Tobago is based in Stockholm, Sweden.

== History ==
On the occasion of the proclamation of Trinidad and Tobago's independence on 31 August 1962, Sweden's Minister for Foreign Affairs, Östen Undén, sent a congratulatory telegram to Trinidad and Tobago's Prime Minister Eric Williams. Undén stated that the Swedish government recognized Trinidad and Tobago as a sovereign and independent state and expressed the Swedish government's wish to maintain friendly and cordial relations with the new state.

Sweden and Trinidad and Tobago established diplomatic relations in July 1966. In 1967, Sweden's ambassador in Caracas, Venezuela, was also accredited to Trinidad and Tobago's capital, Port of Spain.

Since 2000, a Stockholm-based ambassador-at-large for the countries in and around the Caribbean Sea, including Trinidad and Tobago, has been accredited in Port of Spain.

== List of representatives ==
Name	Period	Title	Notes	Presented credentials	Ref
Otto Rathsman	1967–1970	Ambassador	Resident in Caracas		
Per Bertil Kollberg	1971–1975	Ambassador	Resident in Caracas		
Hans Ewerlöf	1976–1979	Ambassador	Resident in Caracas		
Carl Gustaf von Platen	1980–1984	Ambassador	Resident in Caracas		
Lars Schönander	1984–1988	Ambassador	Resident in Caracas		
Karl Wärnberg	1989–1991	Ambassador	Resident in Caracas		
Peter Landelius	1991–1996	Ambassador	Resident in Caracas		
Magnus Nordbäck	1997–2000	Ambassador	Resident in Caracas		
Hans Linton	2000–2004	Ambassador	Resident in Stockholm		
Sten Ask	2004–2010	Ambassador	Resident in Stockholm		
Claes Hammar	23 March 2011 – 2016	Ambassador	Resident in Stockholm		
Elisabeth Eklund	2017–2022	Ambassador	Resident in Stockholm	6 February 2018	
Anders Bengtcén	2023–2025	Ambassador	Resident in Stockholm	24 October 2023	
Maria Velasco	2025–present	Ambassador	Resident in Stockholm	4 November 2025	
