= List of ambassadors of Sweden to Cuba =

Ambassador of Sweden to Cuba
- Lesser coat of arms of the Kingdom of Sweden
- Incumbent; Anna Craenen since 2025
- Ministry for Foreign Affairs; Swedish Embassy, Havana
- Style: His or Her Excellency (formal); Mr. or Madam Ambassador (informal)
- Reports to: Minister for Foreign Affairs
- Seat: Havana, Cuba
- Appointer: Government of Sweden
- Term length: No fixed term
- Inaugural holder: Gylfe Anderberg
- Formation: 1921
- Website: Swedish Embassy, Havana

The Ambassador of Sweden to Cuba (known formally as the Ambassador of the Kingdom of Sweden to the Republic of Cuba) is the official representative of the government of Sweden to the president of Cuba and government of Cuba.

== History ==
In a report on the reorganization of the Ministry for Foreign Affairs in early January 1921, the experts recommended a proposal from the Swedish chargé d'affaires in Mexico to extend the mission's area of responsibility to the Central American states, British Honduras, as well as Cuba, Venezuela, Colombia, Haiti, and San Domingo, along with the British, French, Dutch, and American possessions in the West Indies. On 30 September 1921, Gylfe Anderberg was appointed Sweden's first minister in Havana, based in Mexico City.

A 1938 trade report proposed strengthening Sweden's diplomatic presence in key export markets by establishing new positions in Havana, Wellington, and Rio de Janeiro. A debate followed regarding whether to station the position in Havana or Kingston. In February 1939, it was concluded that Cuba's diplomatic needs could be met through internal reassignment. The Swedish mission in Havana became operational in October 1939, covering Cuba, Haiti, the Dominican Republic, and parts of the West Indies.

In 1951, the Swedish government decided to eliminate the diplomatic position in Havana, transferring responsibilities to the envoy in Mexico City, while local consuls managed minor affairs. However, by 1969, Sweden's growing interests in Cuba justified the establishment of a Swedish embassy in Havana, led by a chargé d'affaires ad interim under the ambassador in Mexico.

In April 1963, an agreement was reached to elevate Sweden's legation in Havana and Cuba's legation in Stockholm to embassies. On 3 April, Ambassador Tord Göransson, resident in Mexico City, was appointed ambassador to Havana as well. In 1972, the mission was elevated to an independent embassy, and Hans Björk was appointed Sweden's first resident ambassador in Havana.

== List of representatives ==
Name	Period	Title	Resident / Concurrent accreditation	Notes	Presented credentials	Ref
Republic of Cuba (1902–1959)
Gylfe Anderberg	30 September 1921 – 1 February 1938	Envoy	Resident in Mexico City			
Vilhelm Assarsson	1 February 1938 – 1940	Envoy	Resident in Mexico City			
Erik Wisén	1 July 1939 – 1943	Chargé d'affaires ad interim (Note: He held the following diplomatic ranks: legation counselor.)	Also accredited to Ciudad Trujillo (from 1941) and Port-au-Prince (from 1941)			
Erik Wisén	1943–1948	Chargé d'affaires (Note: He held the following diplomatic ranks: legation counselor (1943–1948) and minister plenipotentiary (1948).)	Also accredited to Ciudad Trujillo and Port-au-Prince			
Karl Yngve Vendel	1948–1951	Chargé d'affaires	Also accredited to Ciudad Trujillo and Port-au-Prince			
Fritz Stackelberg	1951–1953	Envoy	Resident in Caracas			
Carl-Herbert Borgenstierna	1953–1958	Envoy	Resident in Caracas			
Gunnar Dryselius	1958–1959	Envoy	Resident in Caracas			
Second Republic of Cuba (1959–present)
Gunnar Dryselius	1959–1963	Envoy	Resident in Caracas			
Tord Göransson	3 April 1964 – 1969	Ambassador	Resident in Mexico City			
Carl-Henric Nauckhoff	1969–1972	Ambassador	Resident in Mexico City			
Carl-Johan Groth	1969–1972	Chargé d'affaires ad interim (Note: He held the following diplomatic ranks: first embassy secretary (1969–1971) and embassy counselor (1971–1972).)				
Hans Björk	1973–1976	Ambassador	Also accredited to Kingston (from 1974)			
Thord Bengtson	1977–1979	Ambassador	Also accredited to Kingston			
Anders Sandström	1980–1984	Ambassador	Also accredited to Kingston			
Jan Ståhl	1984–1987	Ambassador	Also accredited to Kingston			
Krister Göranson	1987–1991	Ambassador				
Karin Oldfelt Hjertonsson	1991–1995	Ambassador				
Michael Frühling	1995–2000	Ambassador				
Eivor Halkjaer	2000–2004	Ambassador				
Christer Elm	2004–2008	Ambassador				
Caroline Fleetwood	2008–2012	Ambassador				
Hanna Lambert	2012–2012	Chargé d'affaires ad interim				
Elisabeth Eklund	2013–2016	Ambassador				
Jonas Lovén	September 2016 – 2019	Ambassador				
Tomas Wiklund	1 September 2019 – 2022	Ambassador			11 October 2019	
Hanna Lambert	August 2022 – 2025	Ambassador	Also accredited to Santo Domingo		6 October 2022	
Anna Craenen	2025–present	Ambassador	Also accredited to Santo Domingo		23 September 2025	
