= List of ambassadors of Sweden to Haiti =

Ambassador of Sweden to Haiti
- Lesser coat of arms of the Kingdom of Sweden
- Incumbent; Maria Velasco since 2025
- Ministry for Foreign Affairs
- Style: His or Her Excellency (formal); Mr. or Madam Ambassador (informal)
- Reports to: Minister for Foreign Affairs
- Seat: Stockholm, Sweden (Note: The ambassador is based in Stockholm, Sweden.)
- Appointer: Government of Sweden
- Term length: No fixed term
- Inaugural holder: Erik Wisén
- Formation: 1941

The Ambassador of Sweden to Haiti (known formally as the Ambassador of the Kingdom of Sweden to the Republic of Haiti) is the official representative of the government of Sweden to the president of Haiti and government of Haiti. The ambassador is based in Stockholm.

== History ==
In a report on the reorganization of the Ministry for Foreign Affairs in early January 1921, the experts recommended a proposal from the Swedish chargé d'affaires in Mexico to extend the mission's area of responsibility to the Central American states, British Honduras, as well as Cuba, Venezuela, Colombia, Haiti, and San Domingo, along with the British, French, Dutch, and American possessions in the West Indies.

Sweden and Haiti established diplomatic relations on 31 March 1941 when first chargé d'affaires ad interim of Sweden to Haiti (resident in Havana, Cuba) Erik Wisén presented his credentials.

From 1951, the Swedish envoy in Caracas, Venezuela, was also accredited to Port-au-Prince, the capital of Haiti. The position was vacant from 1967 to 1969 and then abolished in 1970. In 1976, the Swedish ambassador in Caracas again became concurrently accredited to Port-au-Prince.

Since 1980, Sweden's ambassador accredited to Haiti has been based in Stockholm. That year, the Swedish foreign service changed its system for concurrent accreditations and appointed several ambassadors-at-large stationed in Stockholm. In August 1980, Erik Tennander was appointed ambassador-at-large for the countries in and around the Caribbean Sea, including Haiti.

== List of representatives ==
Name	Period	Title	Resident / Concurrent accreditation	Notes	Presented credentials	Ref
Republic of Haiti (1859–1957)
Erik Wisén	1941–1943	Chargé d'affaires ad interim (Note: He held the following diplomatic ranks: legation counselor.)	Resident in Havana		31 March 1941	
Erik Wisén	1943–1948	Chargé d'affaires (Note: He held the following diplomatic ranks: legation counselor (1943–1948) and minister plenipotentiary (1948).)	Resident in Havana			
Karl Yngve Vendel	1948–1951	Chargé d'affaires	Resident in Havana			
Fritz Stackelberg	1951–1953	Envoy	Resident in Caracas			
Carl-Herbert Borgenstierna	1953–1957	Envoy	Resident in Caracas			
Duvalier dynasty (1957–1986)
Gunnar Dryselius	1958 – January 1959	Envoy	Resident in Caracas		23 April 1958	
Gunnar Dryselius	January 1959 – 1963	Ambassador	Resident in Caracas			
Knut Bernström	1963–1966	Ambassador	Resident in Caracas			
–	1967–1969	Ambassador		Vacant		
No head of mission between 1970 and 1975
Hans Ewerlöf	1976–1979	Ambassador	Resident in Caracas			
Erik Tennander	1980–1985	Ambassador	Resident in Stockholm			
Third Haitian Republic (1986–present)
Lennart Klackenberg	1986–1995	Ambassador	Resident in Stockholm			
–	1996–1996	Ambassador		Vacant		
Hans Linton	1997–2004	Ambassador	Resident in Stockholm			
Sten Ask	2004 – June 2010	Ambassador	Resident in Stockholm			
Claes Hammar	2010–2016	Ambassador	Resident in Stockholm		21 January 2012	
Elisabeth Eklund	2017–2022	Ambassador	Resident in Stockholm		8 November 2017	
Anders Bengtcén	2022–2025	Ambassador	Resident in Stockholm			
Maria Velasco	2025–present	Ambassador	Resident in Stockholm		8 September 2026 (Note: On 8 September 2026, Velasco presented her credentials to Acting Prime Minister Alix Didier Fils-Aimé. At the time, the presidency was vacant. Earlier that same year, on 13 May 2026, Velasco presented her credentials to Foreign Minister Raina Forbin.)	
