= List of ambassadors of Sweden to Barbados =

Ambassador of Sweden to Barbados
- Lesser coat of arms of the Kingdom of Sweden
- Incumbent; Maria Velasco since 2025
- Ministry for Foreign Affairs
- Style: His or Her Excellency (formal); Mr. or Madam Ambassador (informal)
- Reports to: Minister for Foreign Affairs
- Seat: Stockholm, Sweden (Note: Swedish ambassador to Barbados is based in Stockholm, Sweden.)
- Appointer: Government of Sweden
- Term length: No fixed term
- Inaugural holder: Hans Ewerlöf
- Formation: 1976

The Ambassador of Sweden to Barbados (known formally as the Ambassador of the Kingdom of Sweden to Barbados) is the official representative of the government of Sweden to the president of Barbados and government of Barbados. Since Sweden does not have an embassy in Bridgetown, Sweden's ambassador to Barbados is based in Stockholm, Sweden.

== History ==
On the occasion of the proclamation of Barbados' independence on 30 November 1966, Sweden's Prime Minister Tage Erlander stated in a congratulatory telegram to Barbados' Prime Minister, Errol Barrow, that the Swedish government recognized Barbados as a sovereign and independent state and expressed the Swedish government's wish to maintain friendly and cordial relations with Barbados.

Sweden and Barbados established diplomatic relations on 19 March 1976. The same year, Sweden's ambassador in Caracas, Venezuela, was also accredited to Barbados' capital, Bridgetown.

Since 1997, a Stockholm-based ambassador-at-large for the countries in and around the Caribbean Sea, including Barbados, has been accredited in Bridgetown.

== List of representatives ==
Name	Period	Title	Resident / Concurrent accreditation	Notes	Presented credentials	Ref
Hans Ewerlöf	1976–1979	Ambassador	Resident in Caracas			
Carl Gustaf von Platen	1980–1984	Ambassador	Resident in Caracas			
Lars Schönander	1984–1988	Ambassador	Resident in Caracas			
Karl Wärnberg	1989–1991	Ambassador	Resident in Caracas			
Peter Landelius	1992–1996	Ambassador	Resident in Caracas			
Hans Linton	1997–2004	Ambassador	Resident in Stockholm			
Sten Ask	2004–2010	Ambassador	Resident in Stockholm		19 April 2005	
Claes Hammar	2011–2016	Ambassador	Resident in Stockholm			
Elisabeth Eklund	2017–2022	Ambassador	Resident in Stockholm		4 April 2017	
Anders Bengtcén	2022–2025	Ambassador	Resident in Stockholm		31 October 2023	
Maria Velasco	2025–present	Ambassador	Resident in Stockholm			
