= Hans Linton =

Swedish diplomat (1939–2010)

- Born: Hans Krister Georg Linton; 23 April 1939; Halmstad, Sweden
- Died: 7 July 2010 (aged 71); Stockholm, Sweden
- Education: Stockholm University
- Occupation: Diplomat
- Years active: 1964–2004
- Spouse: Berit Emund (m. 1965)
- Children: 4

Hans Krister Georg Linton (23 April 1939 – 7 July 2010) was a Swedish diplomat who joined the Ministry for Foreign Affairs in 1964 after earning a law degree. He served in Geneva and at Swedish embassies in Lima, La Paz, Buenos Aires, and Vienna, and worked in the Prime Minister's Office coordinating foreign, trade, and defence policy. He was ambassador to Peru (with accreditation to Bolivia) from 1984 to 1989, later becoming deputy director-general for legal affairs at the ministry, where he was involved in negotiations on maritime boundaries and law of the sea issues. From 1997 to 2004, he served as ambassador-at-large to several Caribbean countries.

== Early life ==
Linton was born on 23 April 1939 in Halmstad, Sweden, the son of the district clerk (häradsskrivare) Erland Linton and his wife Svenborg (née Svensson). He received a Candidate of Law degree from Stockholm University in 1963.

== Career ==
Linton joined the Ministry for Foreign Affairs as an attaché in 1964. In 1965, he was posted to Sweden's Permanent Delegation to the international organizations in Geneva. From 1968 to 1971, he served at the embassies in Lima and La Paz. He later worked at the Ministry for Foreign Affairs and the Ministry of Commerce and Industry, and from 1971 to 1974 he was an adviser to the Nordic Council.

He served at the embassy in Buenos Aires from 1975 to 1976, and between 1976 and 1978 he was an adviser in the Prime Minister's Office, where he coordinated foreign, trade, and defence policy matters. From 1979 to 1984, he was minister in Vienna, followed by his appointment as ambassador to Lima from 1984 to 1989, with concurrent accreditation to La Paz.

In 1989, he became director-general (departementsråd) at the Legal Department of the Ministry for Foreign Affairs, and in 1994 he was appointed deputy director-general for legal affairs. During this period, he was involved in the final negotiations between Finland and Sweden on the delimitation of the exclusive economic zone. In August 1994, he served as Sweden's representative to the Preparatory Commission for the International Seabed Authority and for the International Tribunal for the Law of the Sea in New York City.

In 1997, Linton was appointed ambassador-at-large for the countries in and around the Caribbean Sea, while remaining based at the Ministry for Foreign Affairs in Stockholm. From 1997 to 2004, he served as ambassador to Port-au-Prince, Santo Domingo, St. George's, Castries, Kingstown, Kingston, Roseau, Basseterre, and Bridgetown. He was also accredited as ambassador to St. John's from 1999 to 2004, to Georgetown from 2000 to 2004, and to Port of Spain from 2000 to 2004.

== Personal life ==
In 1965, Linton married the civilekonom Berit Emund (born 1939), the daughter of Julius Emund and Kristina (née Engblom). Berit, like her husband, worked at the Ministry for Foreign Affairs, where she served as a desk officer (departementssekreterare). The couple had four children.

== Death ==
Linton died on 7 July 2010 in Stockholm, Sweden. He was interred on 28 July 2010 at Bromma Cemetery.

== Awards and decorations ==
- (Peru) Order of Merit for Distinguished Services (February 1972)

Diplomatic posts
Preceded by Cai Melin	Ambassador of Sweden to Peru; 1984–1989	Succeeded by Carl-Erhard Lindahl
Preceded by Cai Melin	Ambassador of Sweden to Bolivia; 1984–1989	Succeeded by Carl-Erhard Lindahl
Preceded by Lennart Klackenberg	Ambassador of Sweden to Haiti; 1997–2004	Succeeded by Sten Ask
Preceded by Lennart Klackenberg	Ambassador of Sweden to the Dominican Republic; 1997–2004	Succeeded by Sten Ask
Preceded by Lennart Klackenberg	Ambassador of Sweden to Grenada; 1997–2004	Succeeded by Sten Ask
Preceded by Lennart Klackenberg	Ambassador of Sweden to Saint Lucia; 1997–2004	Succeeded by Sten Ask
Preceded by Lennart Klackenberg	Ambassador of Sweden to Saint Vincent and the Grenadines; 1997–2004	Succeeded by Sten Ask
Preceded by Lennart Klackenberg	Ambassador of Sweden to Jamaica; 1997–2004	Succeeded by Sten Ask
Preceded by Lennart Klackenberg	Ambassador of Sweden to Dominica; 1997–2004	Succeeded by Sten Ask
Preceded by Lennart Klackenberg	Ambassador of Sweden to Saint Kitts and Nevis; 1997–2004	Succeeded by Sten Ask
Preceded by Peter Landelius	Ambassador of Sweden to Barbados; 1997–2004	Succeeded by Sten Ask
Preceded by Lennart Klackenberg	Ambassador of Sweden to Antigua and Barbuda; 1999–2004	Succeeded by Sten Ask
Preceded by Magnus Nordbäck	Ambassador of Sweden to Guyana; 2000–2004	Succeeded by Sten Ask
Preceded by Magnus Nordbäck	Ambassador of Sweden to Trinidad and Tobago; 2000–2004	Succeeded by Sten Ask
