= List of ambassadors of Sweden to the Dominican Republic =

Ambassador of Sweden to the Dominican Republic
- Lesser coat of arms of the Kingdom of Sweden
- Incumbent; Anna Craenen since 2025
- Ministry for Foreign Affairs; Swedish Embassy, Havana
- Style: His/Her Excellency (formal); Mr./Madam Ambassador (informal)
- Reports to: Minister for Foreign Affairs
- Seat: Havana, Cuba (Note: The Swedish ambassador to the Dominican Republic is resident in Havana, Cuba.)
- Appointer: Government of Sweden
- Term length: No fixed term
- Inaugural holder: Erik Wisén
- Formation: 1941

The Ambassador of Sweden to the Dominican Republic (known formally as the Ambassador of the Kingdom of Sweden to the Dominican Republic) is the official representative of the government of Sweden to the president of the Dominican Republic and government of the Dominican Republic. Since Sweden does not have an embassy in Santo Domingo, Sweden's ambassador to the Dominican Republic is resident in Havana, Cuba.

== History ==
In a report on the reorganization of the Ministry for Foreign Affairs in early January 1921, the experts endorsed a proposal from the Swedish chargé d'affaires in Mexico City to extend the mission's area of responsibility to include the Central American states, British Honduras, as well as Cuba, Venezuela, Colombia, Haiti, and San Domingo, along with the British, French, Dutch, and American possessions in the West Indies.

Legation Counsellor Erik Wisén, resident in Havana, Cuba, was accredited as chargé d'affaires ad interim to the Dominican Republic in 1941. Sweden and the Dominican Republic formally established diplomatic relations on 16 July 1942. (Note: Erik Wisén, resident in Havana, Cuba, is listed in the following source as chargé d'affaires ad interim from 1941. The date (16 July 1942) for the "establishment of diplomatic relations" in the following source likely refers to when Wisén presented his diplomatic credentials.)

In 1951, Sweden's envoy in Caracas, Venezuela, was also accredited to the Dominican Republic's capital, Santo Domingo, then officially known as Ciudad Trujillo. From 1997, a Stockholm-based ambassador-at-large for the countries in and around the Caribbean Sea, including the Dominican Republic, took over accreditation for Santo Domingo. In 2022, accreditation for the Dominican Republic was returned to Sweden's ambassador in Havana, Cuba.

== List of representatives ==
Name	Period	Title	Resident / Concurrent accreditation	Notes	Presented credentials	Ref
Third Dominican Republic (1924–1966)
Erik Wisén	1941–1943	Chargé d'affaires ad interim (Note: He held the following diplomatic ranks: legation counselor.)	Resident in Havana			
Erik Wisén	1943–1948	Chargé d'affaires (Note: He held the following diplomatic ranks: legation counselor (1943–1948) and minister plenipotentiary (1948).)	Resident in Havana			
Karl Yngve Vendel	1948–1951	Chargé d'affaires	Resident in Havana			
Fritz Stackelberg	1951–1953	Envoy	Resident in Caracas			
Carl-Herbert Borgenstierna	1953–1957	Envoy	Resident in Caracas			
Gunnar Dryselius	1958 – January 1959	Envoy	Resident in Caracas		9 April 1958	
Gunnar Dryselius	January 1959 – 1963	Ambassador	Resident in Caracas			
Knut Bernström	1963–1966	Ambassador	Resident in Caracas			
Fourth Dominican Republic (1966–present)
Otto Rathsman	1966–1970	Ambassador	Resident in Caracas			
Per Bertil Kollberg	1970–1975	Ambassador	Resident in Caracas			
Hans Ewerlöf	1976–1979	Ambassador	Resident in Caracas			
Erik Tennander	1980–1985	Ambassador	Resident in Stockholm			
Lennart Klackenberg	1986–1995	Ambassador	Resident in Stockholm			
–	1996–1996	Ambassador		Vacant		
Hans Linton	1997–2004	Ambassador	Resident in Stockholm		16 February 1998	
Sten Ask	2004–2010	Ambassador	Resident in Stockholm		29 November 2005	
Claes Hammar	2011–2016	Ambassador	Resident in Stockholm		11 October 2011	
Elisabeth Eklund	2019–2022	Ambassador	Resident in Stockholm		19 June 2019	
Hanna Lambert	2022–2025	Ambassador	Resident in Havana		22 May 2023	
Anna Craenen	2025–present	Ambassador	Resident in Havana		22 April 2026	
