= Per Bertil Kollberg =

Swedish diplomat (1921–2008)

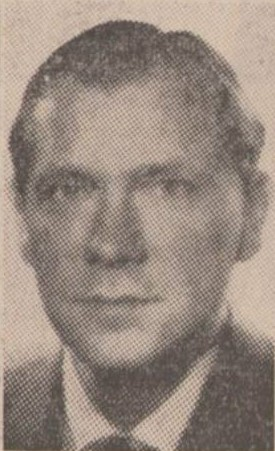
- Kollberg c. 1960s
- Born: Per Bertil Northamn Kollberg; 8 March 1921; Stockholm, Sweden
- Died: 7 November 2008 (aged 87); Stockholm, Sweden
- Education: Stockholm University College
- Occupation: Diplomat
- Years active: 1944–1987
- Spouse: Inge Nielsen (m. 1946; died 2004)

Per Bertil Northamn Kollberg (8 March 1921 – 7 November 2008) was a Swedish diplomat. Kollberg had a long career in the Swedish diplomatic service, beginning as an attaché in 1944. He held key postings in cities such as Paris, Budapest, Bucharest, London, Washington, and Geneva, where he represented Sweden at major international trade negotiations. He served as ambassador in several countries, including Tunisia, Libya, Venezuela, Argentina, and Romania. Notably, he handled the sensitive case of Dagmar Hagelin during his time in Buenos Aires. His work spanned over four decades and reflected Sweden's active role in global diplomacy during the Cold War era.

== Early life ==
Kollberg was born on 8 March 1921 in Stockholm, Sweden, the son of Alfred Kollberg, Director General at the National Swedish Board of Excise (Kontrollstyrelsen), and his wife Gurli (née Lagerheim-Lager). He completed his studentexamen at Norra Real in Stockholm in 1939 and earned a Candidate of Law degree from Stockholm University College in 1944.

== Career ==
Kollberg joined the Swedish Ministry for Foreign Affairs as an attaché in 1944. From 1945 to 1954, he served in Paris, Budapest, Bucharest, and at the Foreign Ministry in Stockholm. Between 1955 and 1959, he was Sweden's Permanent Representative to the United Nations in Geneva. During this time, he also participated in numerous trade policy negotiations and represented Sweden at various international conferences. These included the annual meeting of the United Nations Economic Commission for Europe's Trade Committee in Geneva beginning on 27 September 1955, the eleventh GATT Conference in Geneva starting on 11 October 1956, the European Commission's Trade Committee meeting in Geneva in October 1956, and another GATT session in Geneva in April 1957.

He was appointed commercial counsellor in London in 1959 and became embassy counsellor there in 1961. From 1963 to 1967, he served as ambassador to Tunis and Tripoli. Between 1967 and 1970, he was embassy counsellor with the rank of minister at the Swedish Embassy in Washington. He was then posted as ambassador to Caracas from 1970 to 1975, with concurrent accreditation to Port of Spain (from 1971) and Santo Domingo. From 1976 to 1977, he served as ambassador in Buenos Aires, where he notably handled the case of Dagmar Hagelin, a Swedish-Argentine girl who disappeared in January 1977. In 1978, he returned to the Ministry for Foreign Affairs as a negotiator and later served as ambassador to Bucharest from 1982 to 1987.

== Personal life ==
In 1946, Kollberg married Inge Nielsen (1925–2004), the daughter of the wholesaler Winfried Nielsen and Anna Andersen. They had three children: Per (born 1947), Lars (born 1948), and Marianne (born 1961).

== Death ==
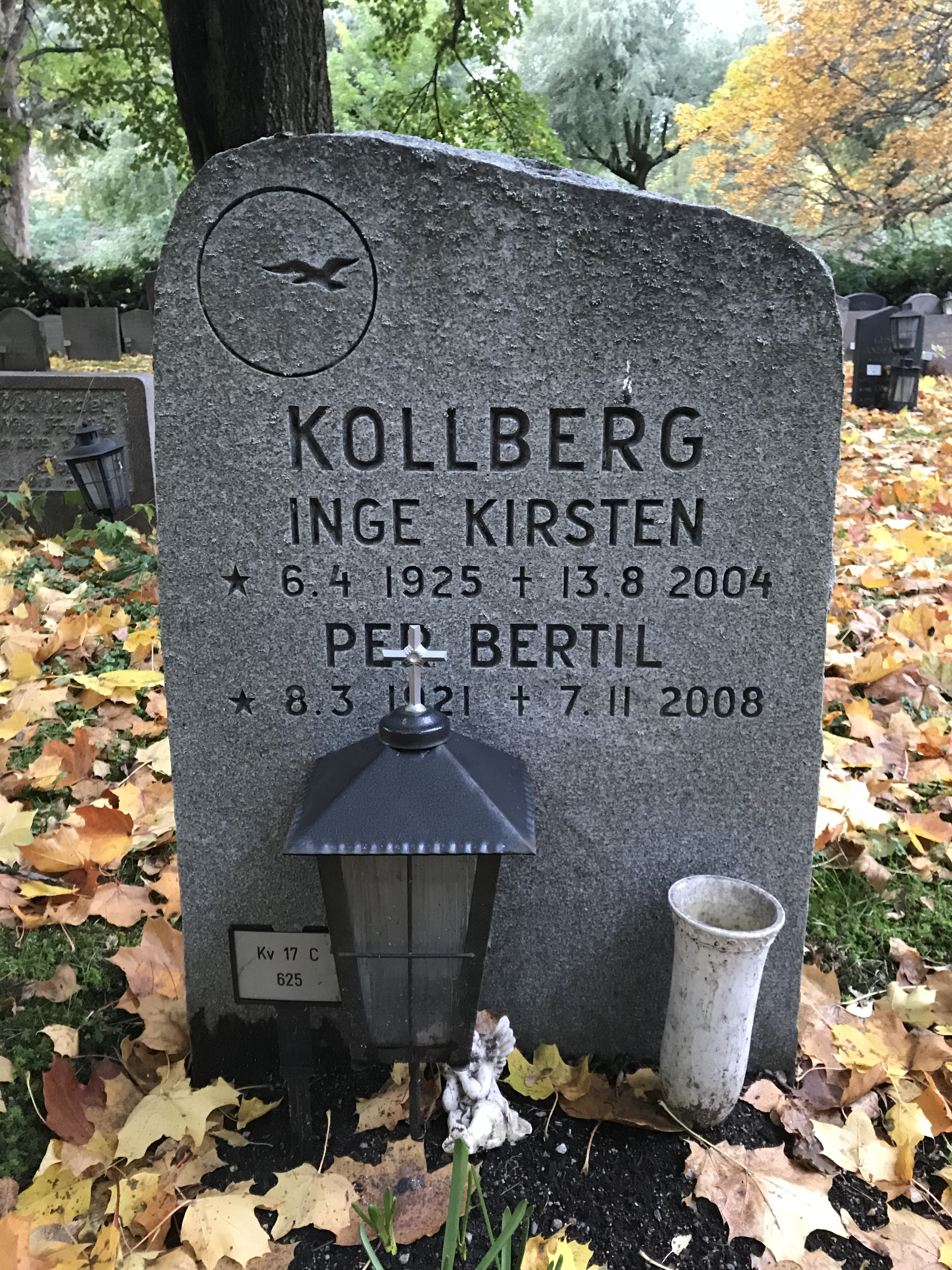
Kollberg and his wife's gravestone at Norra begravningsplatsen

Kollberg died on 7 November 2008 in Stockholm, Sweden. In his final days, he had been receiving care at Stockholms sjukhem. He was interred on 5 December 2008 at Norra begravningsplatsen in Solna.

== Awards and decorations ==
- (Sweden) Commander of the Order of the Polar Star (11 November 1972)
- (Sweden) Knight of the Order of the Polar Star (1963)
- (Greece) Officer of the Order of the Phoenix

Diplomatic posts
Preceded by Torsten Björck	Permanent Representative of Sweden to the United Nations in Geneva; 1955–1959	Succeeded by Carl Henrik von Platen
Preceded by Lennart Petri	Ambassador of Sweden to Tunisia; 1963–1967	Succeeded by Lars Hedström
Preceded by Lennart Petri	Ambassador of Sweden to Libya; 1963–1967	Succeeded by Lars Hedström
Preceded by Otto Rathsman	Ambassador of Sweden to Venezuela; 1970–1975	Succeeded by Hans Ewerlöf
Preceded by Otto Rathsman	Ambassador of Sweden to the Dominican Republic; 1970–1975	Succeeded by Hans Ewerlöf
Preceded by Otto Rathsman	Ambassador of Sweden to Trinidad and Tobago; 1971–1975	Succeeded by Hans Ewerlöf
Preceded by Sven Fredrik Hedin	Ambassador of Sweden to Argentina; 1975–1977	Succeeded by Karl-Anders Wollter
Preceded by Hans Sköld	Ambassador of Sweden to Romania; 1982–1987	Succeeded by Sven Linder
