= Fritz Stackelberg =

Swedish diplomat (1899–1988)

Count Fritz Stackelberg
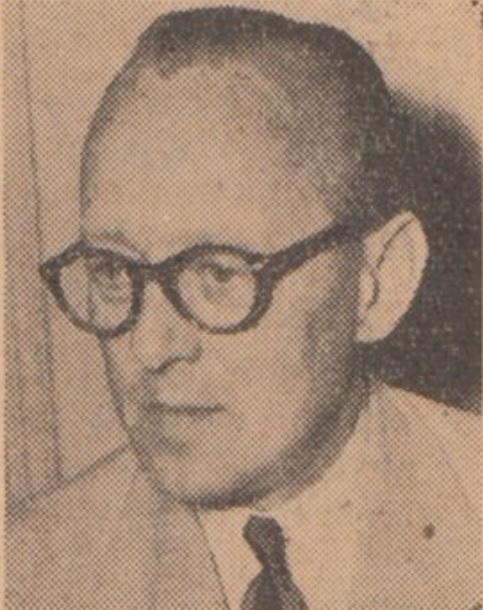
- Born: Fritz Carl Louis Stackelberg; 31 May 1899; Stockholm, Sweden
- Died: 18 November 1988 (aged 89); Stockholm, Sweden
- Other name: "Fred"
- Education: Stockholm University College
- Occupation: Diplomat
- Years active: 1926–1979
- Spouse: Marianne Schumacher (m. 1937)
- Children: 3

Count Fritz "Fred" Carl Louis Stackelberg (31 May 1899 – 18 November 1988) was a Swedish diplomat whose career spanned over four decades. He began at the Ministry for Foreign Affairs in 1926, serving in posts across Europe including Copenhagen, Bern, London, Vienna, Budapest, and Belgrade, and worked as private secretary to the minister for Foreign affairs. He held key positions during and after World War II, acting as government representative in negotiations with Italy, Finland, Bulgaria, and Denmark. From 1948 to 1953, he was Swedish Envoy in Caracas, with accreditation to Havana, Ciudad Trujillo, and Port‑au‑Prince. He later served as Chief of Protocol (1953–1956) and as Ambassador to Greece (Athens, 1956–1962) and Switzerland (Bern, 1962–1965). After his ambassadorial career, he was a member of the Central Board of the International Committee of the Red Cross from 1966 to 1979.

== Early life ==
Born into the noble Stackelberg family on 31 May 1899 in Stockholm, Sweden, he was the son of Ryttmästare Count Adolf Stackelberg (1850–1906) and Countess Charlotte Lewenhaupt (1861–1951). He passed the studentexamen in Linköping on 18 May 1917. He received a Candidate of Law degree from Stockholm University College on 7 November 1925.

== Career ==
=== Military career ===
Stackelberg became an officer cadet at the Svea Artillery Regiment on 26 October 1917. He was appointed constable (konstapel) there on 21 June 1918 and promoted to furir on 30 August 1918. On 21 October 1918 he entered the Military Academy Karlberg. He was promoted to styckjunkare on 30 August 1919 and passed his officers' examination on 18 December 1918. On 13 February 1920 he was commissioned as a second lieutenant in the same regiment.

On 5 August 1921 he was discharged from active service with permission to transfer to the regiment's reserve as a second lieutenant. He was promoted to underlöjtnant in the same reserve on 17 February 1922, to lieutenant in the regiment’s reserve on 18 May 1928, and was finally discharged from the reserve on 19 July 1929.

=== Diplomatic career ===
Stackelberg served at the Consulate in Rouen from 26 January 1925 to 11 January 1926. On 4 June 1926 he was appointed attaché at the Ministry for Foreign Affairs in Stockholm. He subsequently served as attaché in Copenhagen from 7 October 1926, in Bern from 1 December 1926, and at the Consulate General in London from 23 April 1927. On 16 August 1927 he became attaché in Vienna, Budapest, and Belgrade. Between 1928 and 1930 he served at various times as chargé d’affaires ad interim. On 1 July 1930 he returned as attaché to the Ministry for Foreign Affairs, and from 1930 to 1932 he served as the minister for Foreign affairs' private secretary. On 20 February 1931 he was appointed acting second secretary at the Ministry for Foreign Affairs.

From 1932 to 1934 he served in Oslo and Rouen. He was first vice-consul in London from 1935 to 1938. In 1935 he also served as secretary in trade-policy negotiations with Italy. From 1938 to 1940 he was first legation secretary in Rome. In 1940 he was appointed legation counsellor and later that same year became Head of Department at the Ministry for Foreign Affairs.

Between 1941 and 1945 he served as government representative in negotiations with Italy and Finland. In 1944 he acted as chairman of the Swedish delegation in negotiations with Bulgaria. In 1944 he was appointed legation counsellor in Paris. From 1947 he served in Copenhagen, and between 1947 and 1948 he was government representative in negotiations with Denmark.

From 1948 to 1953 he served as Envoy in Caracas, Havana, Ciudad Trujillo (Santo Domingo), and Port-au-Prince. He was Chief of Protocol from 1953 to 1956. He served as Ambassador in Athens from 1956 to 1962 and in Bern from 1962 to 1965. From 1966 to 1979 he was a member of the Central Board of the International Committee of the Red Cross.

== Personal life and death ==
In 1937, he married Marianne Schumacher (1915–1999), the daughter of lawyer Adolf Schumacher and Greta Schumacher (née Lindström). He was the father of Claes-Erik (born 1938), Katarina (born 1939), and Madeleine (born 1948).

A fund was established for the Ministry for Foreign Affairs through the will of Fritz Stackelberg's aunt, Countess Anna Bogeman-Stackelberg, more than 30 years prior to his death. The fund provided financial support to ministry officials and employees who faced unforeseen difficulties not covered by Sweden's welfare system, such as children's schooling, education, illness, or other unavoidable hardships. Fritz Stackelberg played a highly commendable role in shaping the fund, which grew to a substantial amount over the years, and he remained actively involved in managing its proceeds until the end.

Stackelberg died on 18 November 1988 in Stockholm. The funeral took place on 30 November 1988 in Gustaf Adolf Church in Stockholm.

== Awards and decorations ==
=== Swedish ===
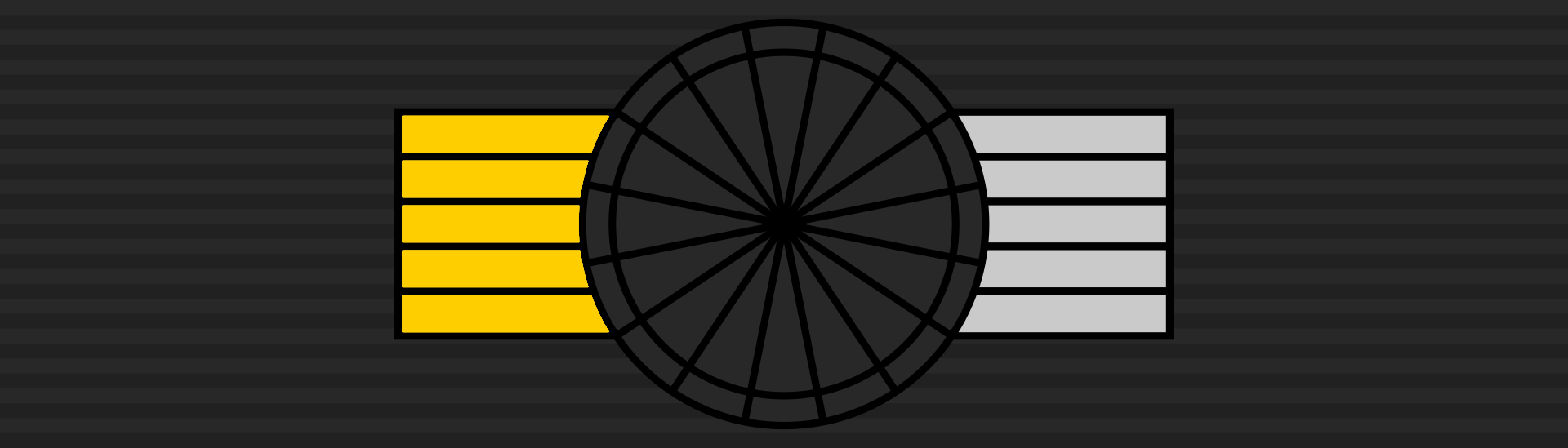
- (Sweden) Commander 1st Class of the Order of the Polar Star (6 June 1963)
- (Sweden) Commander of the Order of the Polar Star (11 November 1952)
- (Sweden) Knight of the Order of the Polar Star (1944)
- Knight of the Order of Saint John in Sweden
- (Sweden) Herald of the Orders of His Majesty the King

=== Foreign ===
- (Chile) Grand Cross of the Order of Merit
- (Cuba) Grand Officer of the Order of Carlos Manuel de Céspedes
- (Denmark) Commander 1st Class of the Order of the Dannebrog
- (Ethiopian Empire) Grand Officer of the Order of Menelik II
- (Iceland) Grand Knight's Cross with Star of the Order of the Falcon (22 April 1954)
- (Venezuela) Grand Officer of the Order of Bolivar
- Commander of the Order of the Lion of Finland
- (Italy) Commander of the Order of Saints Maurice and Lazarus (20 October 1941)
- (Taiwan) Commander of the Order of the Golden Star of China
- (United Kingdom) Commander of the Royal Victorian Order
- Knight 1st Class of the Order of the White Rose of Finland (December 1932)
- (France) Officer of the Legion of Honour
- (Austria) Officer of the Austrian Badge of Honor (1930)
- (Greece) First Class of the Greek Red Cross of Badge of Honor with laurel wreath

Diplomatic posts
Preceded by Rolf Arfwedson as Chargé d'affaires	Envoy of Sweden to Venezuela; 1948–1953	Succeeded by Carl-Herbert Borgenstierna
Preceded by Karl Yngve Vendel as Chargé d'affaires	Envoy of Sweden to Cuba; 1951–1953	Succeeded by Carl-Herbert Borgenstierna
Preceded by Karl Yngve Vendel as Chargé d'affaires	Envoy of Sweden to the Dominican Republic; 1951–1953	Succeeded by Carl-Herbert Borgenstierna
Preceded by Karl Yngve Vendel as Chargé d'affaires	Envoy of Sweden to Haiti; 1951–1953	Succeeded by Carl-Herbert Borgenstierna
Preceded by Tage Grönwall as Envoy	Ambassador of Sweden to Greece; 1956–1962	Succeeded by Tage Grönwall
Preceded by Torsten Hammarström	Ambassador of Sweden to Switzerland; 1962–1965	Succeeded by Klas Böök
