= Erik Wisén =

Swedish diplomat (1889–1978)

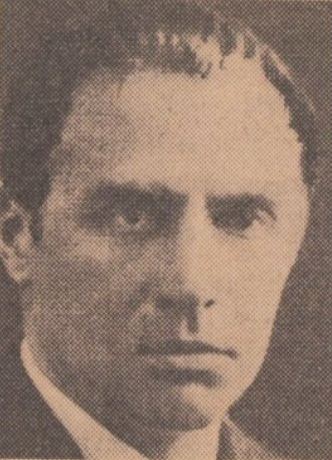
- Born: Erik Johan Sixten Wisén; 25 December 1899; Stockholm, Sweden
- Died: 18 May 1978 (aged 78); Torremolinos, Spain
- Resting place: English Cemetery, Málaga
- Education: Stockholm University College
- Occupation: Diplomat
- Years active: 1918–1953
- Spouse: Alexandra Loviaguine (m. 1926; died 1962)

Erik Johan Sixten Wisén (25 December 1889 – 18 May 1978) was a Swedish diplomat who served in a variety of consular and diplomatic posts, including Constantinople, Hamburg, London, and Shanghai. During the Spanish Civil War (1936–1939), he was Sweden's chargé d'affaires ad interim in Spain, reporting on political and military developments, foreign intervention, and atrocities by both Republican and Nationalist forces. He also oversaw humanitarian efforts, including the evacuation of political refugees and Swedish hospitals for wounded personnel. His wife, Alexandra Wisén, ran children's homes for war orphans, earning both recognition and the Illis quorum medal for their work.

After Spain, Wisén served in the Americas, including as chargé d'affaires in Havana, with concurrent accreditation to Ciudad Trujillo and Port-au-Prince, and participated as a Swedish delegate at the 1947 UN Trade Conference. He later became minister plenipotentiary, head of Department B at the Swedish Ministry for Foreign Affairs, and envoy to Addis Ababa (1950–1953) before retiring.

== Early life ==
Wisén was born on 25 December 1889 in Hedvig Eleonora Parish in Stockholm, Sweden, the son of Johan Gustaf Wisén (born 1851 in Nottebäck), a manufacturer, and his wife Vendela Kristina Adamsson (born 1857 in Lenhovda). He received a Candidate of Law degree from Stockholm University College in 1913.

== Career ==
=== Early career ===
Wisén began his career as a district court clerk (1913–1916), later serving at the Svea Court of Appeal as acting extra legal clerk (fiskal) (1918) and associate member (1919). He joined the Ministry for Foreign Affairs in 1920 and held a succession of postings: acting second legation secretary (1921), acting first legation secretary (1921–1922), legation secretary in Constantinople (1922), acting vice-consul in Hamburg (1924) and London (1925), and vice-consul in Shanghai (1926), where he became acting consul in 1932. After a further period in Hamburg (1933), he was appointed consul in 1934 and later that year became acting director (byråchef) at the Ministry for Foreign Affairs.

=== Spain ===
Wisén was appointed as a trade councilor in Madrid and Lisbon in 1935. Wisén served as Sweden's chargé d'affaires ad interim in Spain during the Spanish Civil War (1936–1939), taking over leadership of the Swedish Legation after the departure of Minister Ivan Danielsson. Previously, Wisén had been a commercial attaché in Madrid during the Second Biennium of the Spanish Republic, giving him deep familiarity with Spain's political and social landscape. Both he and his predecessor provided nuanced assessments of Spanish politics, reporting critically on extremist actions on both sides and documenting the challenges to democratic governance. When the war began in July 1936, Wisén was stationed in San Sebastián. He immediately started sending detailed dispatches to Stockholm, analyzing the fragmentation within the Republican government, the limited influence of moderate parties, and the rise of radical militias. He introduced the term "Nationalists" to describe Franco's forces and closely monitored the organization of the emerging Francoist state. His reports highlighted atrocities committed by both Republican and Nationalist factions, as well as the effects of foreign intervention.

After the Republican government relocated to Valencia in early 1937, Wisén moved the Swedish Legation accordingly. From there, he reported on military operations, bombings of Barcelona and Valencia, the role of the International Brigades, and tensions with anarchist groups. He noted that arming popular militias had weakened government authority and frequently detailed civilian and military casualties, including the bombing of Granollers. Wisén also critiqued the Republican government's anti-British rhetoric, warning that it jeopardized potential international support. Wisén played a central role in humanitarian efforts. He organized the evacuation of political refugees from Republican areas to Valencia, from where they were transported to France and interned in Belgium under Swedish supervision. These operations faced challenges from local authorities and logistical difficulties. He oversaw Swedish and Swedish-Norwegian hospitals for wounded personnel, including volunteers from the International Brigades, and intervened to correct misleading reports in the Swedish press about attacks by Francoist forces.

A major humanitarian initiative was led by Alexandra Wisén, Erik Wisén's wife, who established children's homes for war orphans in Getaria, Dénia, and Teià (Catalonia), the latter also including a school. The Teià facility operated from early 1938 until the fall of Barcelona in March 1939. For her efforts, Alexandra Wisén was labeled an "undesirable element" by Francoist authorities. At the war's end, these homes were transferred to Spanish authorities, representing a significant Swedish humanitarian contribution. Wisén also monitored the Francoist zone, reporting on Franco's assumption of absolute military power, blockades of Republican ports, and the treatment of Swedish citizens. He advised caution in diplomatic engagement with Franco's authorities and participated in prisoner exchange negotiations between Republican and Nationalist forces. Wisén reported to Stockholm on the work of the international commission monitoring aerial bombings, noting that its presence may have contributed to a decline in attacks on civilian targets. He also provided accounts of air raids on Palamós and Caldetas.

Throughout the war, Wisén maintained Sweden's neutral stance while delivering comprehensive and timely information to Stockholm on political, military, and humanitarian developments. His work shaped Sweden's understanding of the Spanish Civil War and ensured protection for Swedish nationals and other vulnerable groups. Together with a small network of Swedish and Spanish diplomats and officials, Wisén's efforts contributed both to humanitarian relief and to the maintenance of Sweden's diplomatic presence in a conflict-ridden Spain. For their efforts in Spain, Erik and Alexandra Wisén were awarded the medal Illis quorum, 8th size, by the King in Council in March 1939. The citation read:

In recognition of the self-sacrificing work carried out under particularly difficult circumstances by the chargé d’affaires ad interim in Spain, E. J. S. Wisén, and his wife, Alexandra Wisén, née Loviaguine, for the benefit of those afflicted and suffering as a result of the Spanish Civil War, each of them is hereby awarded the gold medal Illis quorum meruere labores, eighth size.

=== Later career ===
He became legation counsellor at the Swedish mission in Mexico City and Havana, serving as chargé d'affaires ad interim in Havana from 1 July 1939. He was also accredited to Ciudad Trujillo (from 1941) and Port-au-Prince (from 1941). In 1943, he was appointed chargé d'affaires in Havana, with concurrent accreditation to Ciudad Trujillo and Port-au-Prince. He served as one of Sweden's delegates at the United Nations Trade Conference that opened in Havana in 1947. In October 1948, the Swedish minister for foreign affairs tasked Wisén—acting as ambassador on special assignment—with representing the Swedish government at the forthcoming presidential transition in Cuba.

He was appointed minister plenipotentiary in 1948 and was appointed head of Department B at the Ministry for Foreign Affairs. He served as Envoy in Addis Ababa from 1950 to 1953 and was placed on disponibility (inactive list) from 1953 to 1956.

== Personal life ==
In February 1926, before the Registrar of Marriages in South Kensington, London, where Wisén was then serving as vice consul at the Swedish Consulate General, he married Alexandra Novikoff, née Loviaguine (5 March 1891 – 29 January 1962), the daughter of landowner Sawa Loviaguine and Tatiana (née Verneta).

Alexandra came from an old Russian noble family. She had two children from a previous marriage: a son, Colonel Nicholas Andronovitch, of the U.S. Army administration in Washington, and a daughter, Betty, who married Commander Lucien Tucherman, also in Washington.

After retirement, Erik and Alexandra returned to Spain and settled in Torremolinos. Alexandra died in Málaga of a cerebral hemorrhage on 29 January 1962. She was buried on 31 January 1962 at the English Cemetery in Málaga.

== Death ==
Wisén died of a heart attack on 18 May 1978 in Montemar, Torremolinos, Spain. Erik and Alexandra are buried in grave 582 at the English Cemetery in Málaga, Spain.

== Awards and decorations ==
=== Swedish ===
- (Sweden) King Gustaf V's Jubilee Commemorative Medal (1928)
- (Sweden) Illis quorum, 8th size (3 March 1939)
- (Sweden) Commander of the Order of the Polar Star (5 June 1948)
- (Sweden) Knight of the Order of the Polar Star (1936)

=== Foreign ===
- (Dominican Republic) Grand Officer of the Juan Pablo Duarte Order of Merit
- (Cuba) Commander of the Order of Carlos Manuel de Céspedes
- Commander 1st Class of the Order of the Lion of Finland
- (Tsardom of Bulgaria (1908–1946)) Commander of the Order of Civil Merit
- (Taiwan) Commander of the Order of Brilliant Jade
- (Belgium) Officer of the Order of the Crown
- (Kingdom of Serbia) Officer of the Order of St. Sava
- Knight 1st Class of the Order of the White Rose of Finland
- Grand Officer of the Order of Merit of the Kingdom of Hungary (1947)

Diplomatic posts
| Preceded by Vilhelm Assarsson as Envoy | Charge d'affaires ad interim of Sweden to Cuba; 1939–1943 | Succeeded by Himself as Charge d'affaires |
| Preceded by Himself as Chargé d'affaires ad interim | Charge d'affaires of Sweden to Cuba; 1943–1948 | Succeeded by Karl Yngve Vendel |
| Preceded by Himself as Chargé d'affaires ad interim | Charge d'affaires of Sweden to the Dominican Republic; 1943–1948 | Succeeded by Karl Yngve Vendel |
| Preceded by Himself as Chargé d'affaires ad interim | Charge d'affaires of Sweden to Haiti; 1943–1948 | Succeeded by Karl Yngve Vendel |
| Preceded by Nils-Eric Ekblad as Chargé d'affaires | Envoy of Sweden to Ethiopia; 1950–1953 | Succeeded by Eyvind Bratt |
