= Otto Rathsman =

Swedish diplomat (1917–1986)

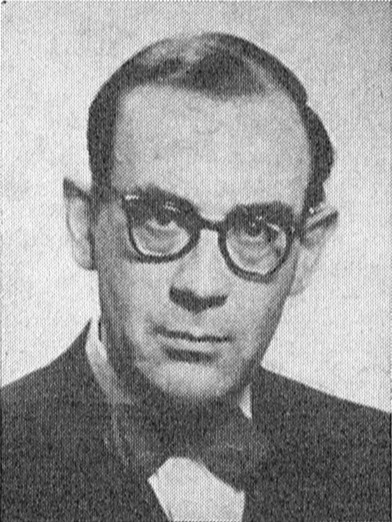
- Born: Per Otto Gustaf Rathsman; 14 August 1917; Ljung, Sweden
- Died: 15 June 1986 (aged 68); Båstad, Sweden
- Education: Uppsala University
- Occupation: Diplomat
- Years active: 1940–1983
- Spouse(s): Ulla Wennerberg (m. 1944–1954) Gunilla Beskow (m. 1955)
- Children: 5

Per Otto Gustaf Rathsman (14 August 1917 – 15 June 1986) was a Swedish diplomat.

== Early life ==
Rathsman was born on 14 August 1917 in Ljung, Linköping Municipality, Sweden, the son of vicar Otto Rathsman and his wife Sara (née Svensson). He passed studentexamen in Linköping in 1936 and received a Candidate of Law degree from Uppsala University in 1939 before becoming an attaché at the Ministry for Foreign Affairs in 1940.

== Career ==
Rathsman served in New York City in 1942, Washington, D.C. in 1943, Buenos Aires in 1945 and was first secretary there in 1950. He was first legation secretary in London in 1950, first secretary in 1953, first legation secretary in Ottawa in 1953, and first secretary in 1957. While serving as first secretary in Ottawa, Rathsman was en route to Stockholm on 25 July 1956 for a two-month vacation when the eastbound MS Stockholm collided with westbound Italian ocean liner SS Andrea Doria. He suffered only a minor head injury.

The year after, Rathsman became Director at the Swedish Foreign Ministry and in 1959 he became embassy counsellor in New Delhi. He became consul (with the title of consul-general) in Nairobi in 1962 and he was ambassador in Nairobi with dual accreditation to Bujumbura, Dar es Salaam, Kampala, Kigali, and Lusaka from 1964 to 1966. He was then ambassador in Caracas, also accredited to Santo Domingo and Port of Spain from 1966 to 1970. After that he was ambassador in Bucharest from 1970 to 1973, Baghdad from 1973 to 1975, consul-general in São Paulo from 1976 to 1980 and consul-general in San Francisco from 1980 to 1982. Before retiring, Rathsman was mediator in the Neutral Nations Supervisory Commission in Korea from 1 April 1982 to 31 March 1983 with the rank of major general.

== Personal life ==
Rathsman was married twice. He was married the first time 1944–1954 to Ulla Wennerberg (born 1921), daughter of John Wennerberg and Karin (née Cederberg). He married a second time in 1955 with Gunilla Beskow (born 1927), daughter of the engineer Fritz Beskow and Rut (née Mellander). He had three children in his first marriage; Ulf (born 1945), Lena (born 1947) and Katarina (born 1949) and two children in his second marriage; Otto (born 1956) and Peter (born 1957).

== Death ==
Rathsman died on 15 June 1986 in Båstad, Sweden. On 21 July 1986, he was interred at Skogskyrkogården in Stockholm.

== Awards and decorations ==
- (Sweden) Knight of the Order of the Polar Star (1962)
- (Norway) Commander of the Order of St. Olav (1959)
- (Iceland) Grand Knight's Cross of the Order of the Falcon (27 June 1957)
- (Netherlands) Officer of the Order of Orange-Nassau
- (Bulgaria) Knight of the Order of Civil Merit
- (Mexico) Knight of the Order of the Aztec Eagle (21 March 1950)

Diplomatic posts
Preceded by None	Consul-General of Sweden to Nairobi; 1962–1964	Succeeded by Himself as Ambassador
Preceded by Himself as Consul general	Consul-General of Sweden to Nairobi; 1964–1966	Succeeded by Carl Gustaf Béve
Preceded by None	Ambassador of Sweden to Burundi; 1964–1966	Succeeded by Carl Gustaf Béve
Preceded by None	Ambassador of Sweden to Rwanda; 1964–1966	Succeeded by None until 1974
Preceded by None	Ambassador of Sweden to Tanzania; 1964–1966	Succeeded by Carl Gustaf Béve
Preceded by None	Ambassador of Sweden to Uganda; 1964–1966	Succeeded by Carl Gustaf Béve
Preceded by None	Ambassador of Sweden to Zambia; 1964–1966	Succeeded by Carl Gustaf Béve
Preceded by Knut Bernström	Ambassador of Sweden to Venezuela; 1966–1970	Succeeded by Per Bertil Kollberg
Preceded by Knut Bernström	Ambassador of Sweden to the Dominican Republic; 1966–1970	Succeeded by Per Bertil Kollberg
Preceded by None	Ambassador of Sweden to Trinidad and Tobago; 1967–1970	Succeeded by Per Bertil Kollberg
Preceded by Carl Johan Rappe	Ambassador of Sweden to Romania; 1970–1973	Succeeded by Lars Hedström
Preceded by Gunnar Gerring	Ambassador of Sweden to Iraq; 1973–1975	Succeeded by Fredrik Bergenstråhle
Preceded by Erik Svedelius as Honorary Consul-General	Consul-general of Sweden to São Paulo; 1976–1980	Succeeded by Alf Ros
Preceded by Fredrik Bergenstråhle	Consul-general of Sweden to San Francisco; 1980–1982	Succeeded by Odd Isaksson as Acting Consul-General
Preceded by Göte Blom	Head of Swedish Delegation to the NNSC; 1 April 1982 – 31 March 1983	Succeeded by Gustaf Peyron
