= Hans Ewerlöf =

Swedish diplomat (1929–2022)

Hans V. Ewerlöf
- Born: Hans Viktor Ewerlöf; 19 June 1929; Stockholm, Sweden
- Died: 30 December 2022 (aged 93); Stockholm, Sweden
- Resting place: Galärvarvskyrkogården
- Education: Stockholm University College; Östra Real
- Occupation: Diplomat
- Years active: 1953–1998
- Spouse: Ebba Hammarskjöld (m. 1956)
- Children: 3

Hans Viktor Ewerlöf (19 June 1929 – 30 December 2022) was a Swedish diplomat whose career in the Ministry for Foreign Affairs began in 1953. He served in several early postings, including London, Berlin, and Belgrade, before advancing to senior roles within the ministry during the 1960s and 1970s. He later held ambassadorial positions in Caracas (1976–1979), and as Sweden's Permanent Representative to the UN and other international organizations in Geneva (1980–1986), where he chaired major bodies such as EFTA, GATT, and the UNHCR Executive Committee. From 1987 to 1993 he was ambassador in Bern, also accredited to Liechtenstein. In 1993, he became First Marshal of the Court, overseeing the Swedish Royal Court's official programme and serving in a key ceremonial and diplomatic role, including a mission to Iraq that contributed to the release of Swedish hostages. He retired in 1998.

== Early life ==
Ewerlöf was born on 19 June 1929 in Stockholm, Sweden, the son of director Bernhard Ewerlöf (1891–1941) and his second wife, Märtha Weidenhielm (1901–1994). He was the brother of trade councillor Carl Bernhard Ewerlöf (1924–2005) and the half-brother of Curt Ewerlöf (1917–2004) from his father's first marriage. His maternal grandfather was the military officer and court official Ernst Weidenhielm (1862–1930), whose father was the county governor Ernst August Weidenhielm (1808–1894). His paternal grandfather was the pharmacist Viktor Ewerlöf (1860–1942).

In 1954, his mother remarried Carl-Axel Trolle-Wachtmeister (1893–1956), Chief Master of the Royal Hunt and a count. Through this marriage, he became the stepbrother of the landowner Count Hans-Gabriel Trolle-Wachtmeister (1923–2023), the parliamentarian Count Knut Wachtmeister (1924–2017), and the cookbook author Baroness Ann Marie Ramel (1931–2017).

He passed the studentexamen from the Östra Real in Stockholm on 19 May 1947. He received a Candidate of Law degree from Stockholm University College in 1952.

== Career ==
Ewerlöf was appointed attaché at the Ministry for Foreign Affairs in 1953 and served in London and Berlin from 1953 to 1957. He became embassy secretary in Belgrade in 1958, counsellor in Geneva in 1968, deputy director (kansliråd) at the Ministry for Foreign Affairs in 1970, deputy director general for foreign affairs (utrikesråd) in 1972, and deputy director general for foreign affairs in 1973. He served as Sweden's representative on the board of the International Energy Agency (IEA) from 1974 to 1975.

He was ambassador to Caracas from 1976 to 1979, with concurrent accreditation to Bridgetown, Georgetown, Paramaribo (from 1978), Port-au-Prince, Port of Spain, and Santo Domingo. He then served as Ambassador and Permanent Representative of Sweden to the International Organizations in Geneva in Geneva from 1980 to 1986. During this period, he chaired the EFTA Council in 1980 and 1983, the General Agreement on Tariffs and Trade (GATT) from 1982 to 1984, and the executive committee of the United Nations High Commissioner for Refugees from 1983 to 1984. He also served as chairman of bilateral trade policy negotiations and led Swedish delegations at various international conferences within the UN, OECD, and GATT.

In 1987 he became ambassador in Bern, and on 24 October 1991 Sweden became the first country to accredit an ambassador to Liechtenstein after the country joined the UN in 1990. Ewerlöf was additionally accredited from his post in Bern. He became First Marshal of the Court in 1993. That same year, after repeated unsuccessful attempts by the Swedish government to secure the release of three Ericsson engineers imprisoned in Iraq on espionage charges, Ewerlöf was sent as the King's envoy to Baghdad carrying a personal letter from King Carl XVI Gustaf to Saddam Hussein. Upon arrival, negotiations with Iraqi officials led to the immediate release of the three Swedish citizens.

In his role at court, he was responsible for managing the official program of the royal couple. He oversaw major royal events including the King's 50th birthday, Crown Princess Victoria's 18th birthday, the King's 25th anniversary as monarch, and various state visits. He retired and left his post on 30 September 1998.

== Personal life ==
On 18 May 1956 at Saint James's Church in Stockholm, Ewerlöf married Ebba Hammarskjöld (born 1933), the daughter of director Carl Hammarskjöld and Marianne (née Virgin). They had three children: Caroline (born 1959), Johan (born 1959), and Fredrik (born 1963).

Ewerlöf had a summer house in Torekov.

== Death ==
Ewerlöf died on 30 December 2022 in Stockholm. The funeral service was held on 25 January 2023 in the Royal Chapel. He was interred on 24 May 2023 at Galärvarvskyrkogården in Stockholm.

== Awards and decorations ==
- (Sweden) H. M. The King's Medal, 12th size gold (silver-gilt) medal worn around the neck on the Order of the Seraphim ribbon (1998)
- (Argentina) Grand Cross of the Order of the Liberator General San Martín (18 May 1998)
- (Iceland) Grand Knight's Cross with Star of the Order of the Falcon (10 June 1975)
- (Italy) Knight Grand Cross of the Order of Merit of the Italian Republic (5 May 1998)

Diplomatic posts
Preceded by Per Bertil Kollberg	Ambassador of Sweden to Venezuela; 1976–1979	Succeeded by Carl Gustaf von Platen
Preceded by Per Bertil Kollberg	Ambassador of Sweden to Trinidad and Tobago; 1976–1979	Succeeded by Carl Gustaf von Platen
Preceded by Per Bertil Kollberg	Ambassador of Sweden to the Dominican Republic; 1976–1979	Succeeded by Erik Tennander
Preceded by None	Ambassador of Sweden to Barbados; 1976–1979	Succeeded by Carl Gustaf von Platen
Preceded by None	Ambassador of Sweden to Guyana; 1976–1979	Succeeded by Erik Tennander
Preceded by Knut Bernström¹	Ambassador of Sweden to Haiti; 1976–1979	Succeeded by Erik Tennander
Preceded by None	Ambassador of Sweden to Suriname; 1978–1979	Succeeded by Erik Tennander
Preceded by Carl De Geer	Permanent Representative of Sweden to the International Organizations in Geneva; 1980–1986	Succeeded by Lars Anell
Preceded by Bengt Odevall	Ambassador of Sweden to Switzerland; 1987–1993	Succeeded by Jan Mårtenson
Preceded by None	Ambassador of Sweden to Liechtenstein; 1991–1993	Succeeded by Jan Mårtenson
Court offices
Preceded by Jan Kuylenstierna	First Marshal of the Court; 1993–1998	Succeeded by Johan Fischerström
Notes and references
1. After Knut Bernström left the post in 1966, it remained vacant for 10 years until Hans Ewerlöf was accredited to Haiti in 1976.
