= Jan Mårtenson =

Swedish writer and diplomat (1933–2026)

Jan Martenson
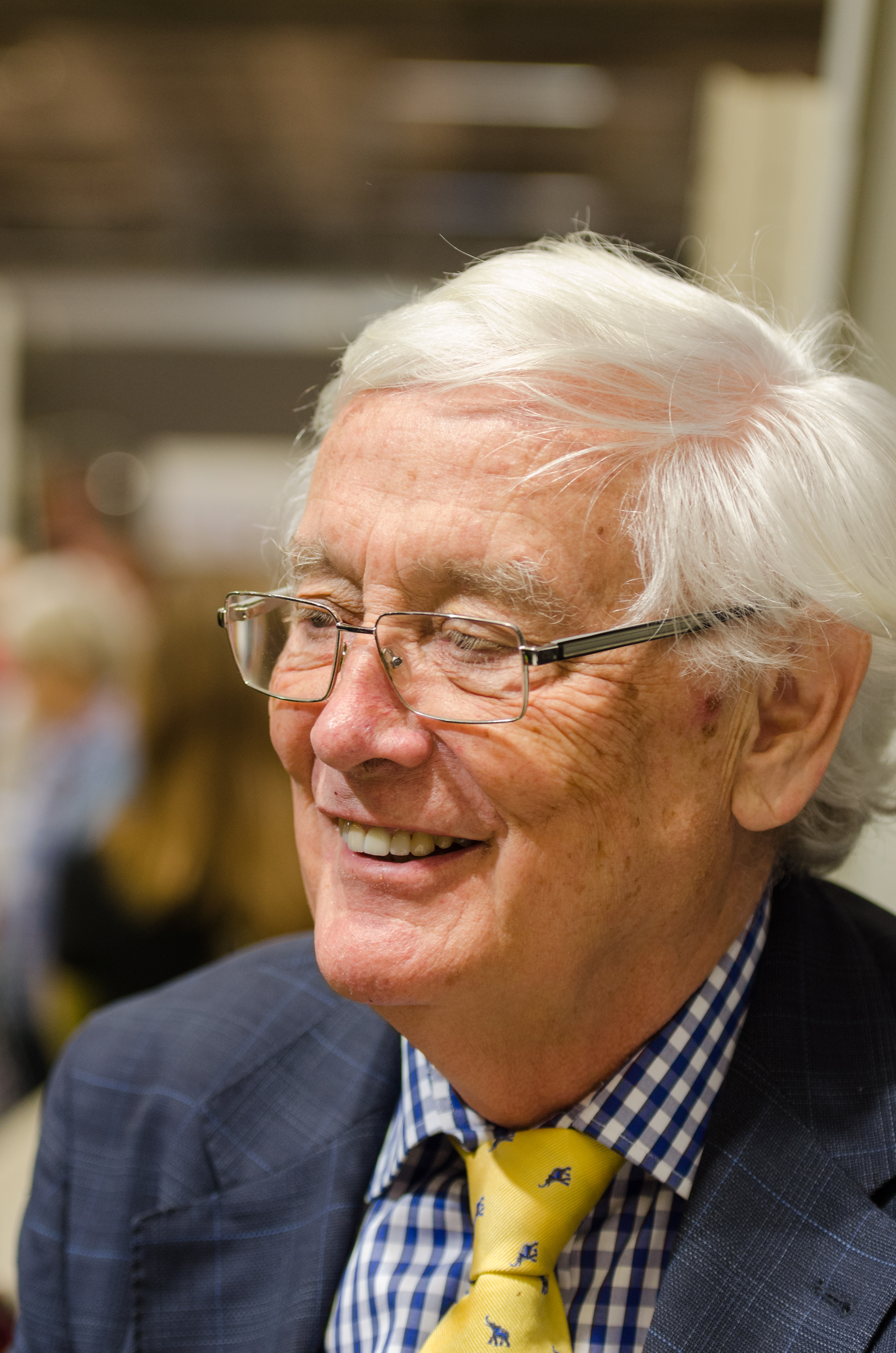
- Martenson in 2012
- Born: Jan Per Gösta Mårtenson; 14 February 1933; Uppsala, Sweden
- Died: 12 January 2026 (aged 92)
- Education: Uppsala University
- Occupations: Diplomat, writer
- Years active: 1960–2001
- Spouse: Ingrid Giertz (m. 1967)

Jan Per Gösta Mårtenson (14 February 1933 – 12 January 2026) was a Swedish diplomat who was also known as the author of some 50 Swedish crime novels.

== Early life ==
Mårtenson was born on 14 February 1933 in Uppsala, Sweden, the son of Colonel Gösta Mårtenson and his wife Marga (née Brandelius). He was the brother of Colonel Hjalmar Mårtenson. Mårtenson became a reserve officer in 1955 and received a Candidate of Law degree from Uppsala University in 1960. Mårtenson later became an honorary member of the Södermanlands-Nerikes nation at the university in 1978.

== Career ==
Mårtenson became an attaché at the Ministry for Foreign Affairs in 1960, serving in Rio de Janeiro, Paris, and New York City. He was Deputy Director of the Stockholm International Peace Research Institute from 1968 to 1969, an expert at the Ministry of Agriculture from 1970 to 1973, and Secretary-General for the National Committee for the United Nations Conference on the Human Environment from 1970 to 1972. From 1973 to 1975, he was a senior official and head of the Ministry for Foreign Affairs' Information Office. He then served as head of His Majesty the King's Office from 1975 to 1979, as Deputy Secretary-General and head of the United Nations Disarmament Department in New York City starting in 1979, and was promoted to Under-Secretary-General in 1983. From 1987 to 1992, he was Director-General and head of the United Nations Office at Geneva as well as head of the United Nations Center for Human Rights. He served as Ambassador to Switzerland and Liechtenstein from 1993 to 1995, as an Ambassador at the Foreign Minister's disposal from 1996 to 1998, and coordinated the Ministry of Foreign Affairs' preparations for the 2004 Olympics.

He chaired the United Nations Committee on Employment and Promotions from 1984 to 1986, was Secretary-General for the UN Conference on Disarmament and Development in 1987, and served as Coordinator for the UN Decade Against Racism from 1987 to 1992. He served on the boards of various human rights institutes, was both Chair and board member of the International Club in Stockholm, and undertook UNESCO missions in Slovenia and Croatia in 1992.

In 1992, he attended the Swedish National Defence College, and from 1999, served as the Marshal of the Diplomatic Corps (Introduktör av främmande sändebud).

== Personal life and death ==
In 1967, Mårtenson married Ingrid Giertz (born 1937). He died on 12 January 2026, at the age of 92.

== Bibliography ==
In his free time he wrote novels. The main character of most of his crime novels is the fictional antique dealer Johan Kristian Homan.

=== Crime novels (Swedish titles) ===
- Helgeandsmordet (1973) - Invitation au suicide, Paris, Librairie des Champs-Élysées, 1978
- Drakguldet (1974) - L’Or du dragon, Paris, Librairie des Champs-Élysées, 1982
- Demonerna (1975)
- Häxhammaren (1976)
- Döden går på museum (1977)
- Döden går på cirkus (1978)
- Vinprovarna (1979) - Death calls on the witches
- Djävulens hand (1980)
- Döden gör en tavla (1981)
- Middag med döden (1982)
- Vampyren (1983)
- Guldmakaren (1984)
- Häxmästaren (1985)
- Rosor från döden (1986)
- Den röda näckrosen (1987)
- Neros bägare (1988)
- Mord i Venedig (1989)
- Akilles häl (1990)
- Ramses hämnd (1991)
- Midas hand (1992)
- Gamens öga (1993)
- Tsarens guld (1994)
- Karons färja (1995)
- Caesars örn (1996)
- Högt spel (1997)
- Det svarta guldet (1998)
- Häxan (1999)
- Mord på Mauritius (2000)
- Ikaros flykt (2001)
- Mord ombord (2002)
- Dödligt svek (2003)
- Ostindiefararen (2004)
- Döden går på auktion (2005)
- Den kinesiska trädgården (2006)
- Spionen (2007)
- Dödssynden (2008)
- Palatsmordet (2009)
- Mord i Havanna (2010)
- Safari med döden (2011)
- Mord i blått (2012)
- Jubileumsmord (2012)
- Den grekiska hjälmen (2013)
- Juvelskrinet (2014)
- Medicis ring (2015)
- Silverapostlarna (2016)
- Elakt spel (2017)
- Den engelske kusinen (2018)

=== Novels under the signature Mårten Janson ===
==== About Jonas Berg ====
- Telegrammet från San José (1971)
- Tre Skilling Banco (1971)
- Nobelpristagaren och döden (1972)

==== Other novels ====
- Släkten är bäst (1978)
- Utsikt från min trappa (1982)
- Mord och mat (1994)
- Mord i Gamla stan (2002)
- Mord på menyn (2003)

=== Other publications ===
- 32 om kärlek (1970), poems
- Drottningholm - slottet vid vattnet (1985), essay
- Sverige (1986)
- Slottet i staden (1989)
- Arvfurstens palats (1991), essay
- Kungliga svenska konstnärer (1994)
- Residens - Svenska EU-ambassader (1997)
- Sofia Albertina - en prinsessas palats (1997), essay
- Att kyssa ett träd (2000), memoirs
- Beridna högvakten (2005)
- Kungliga Djurgården (2007)
- Oss håller inga bojor, oss binder inga band! (2013)
- Ridkonsten i Sverige – historien om hästarna, Strömsholm och mästarna (2015)

Diplomatic posts
Preceded by Hans Ewerlöf	Ambassador of Sweden to Switzerland and Liechtenstein; 1993–1995	Succeeded by Folke Löfgren
