= List of ambassadors of Sweden to Tanzania =

Ambassador of Sweden to Tanzania
- Lesser coat of arms of the Kingdom of Sweden
- Incumbent; Ingrid Johansson since August 2026
- Ministry for Foreign Affairs; Swedish Embassy, Dar es Salaam
- Style: His or Her Excellency (formal); Mr. or Madam Ambassador (informal)
- Reports to: Minister for Foreign Affairs
- Residence: 29 Msasani Rd, Oyster Bay
- Seat: Dar es Salaam, Tanzania
- Appointer: Government of Sweden
- Term length: No fixed term
- Inaugural holder: Otto Rathsman
- Formation: 1964
- Website: Swedish Embassy, Dar es Salaam

The Ambassador of Sweden to Tanzania (known formally as the Ambassador of the Kingdom of Sweden to the United Republic of Tanzania) is the official representative of the government of Sweden to the president of Tanzania and government of Tanzania.

== History ==
Following Tanganyika's declaration of independence on 9 December 1961, Sweden's prime minister Tage Erlander sent a congratulatory telegram to Tanganyika's head of government, Julius Nyerere. Sweden was represented at the ceremonies held from 8–11 December in Dar es Salaam by Ambassador Alva Myrdal.

In a March 1963 proposal, it was suggested that a new mission be established in Dar es Salaam, Tanganyika, to be led by a chargé d'affaires ad interim. A Swedish embassy was established in Nairobi, Kenya, in 1964, and Ambassador Otto Rathsman was also accredited as Sweden's first ambassador to Tanzania. In Dar es Salaam, an embassy secretary—later an embassy counselor—was stationed and acted as chargé d'affaires when the ambassador in Nairobi was not in the country.

On 1 July 1968, Sweden opened an embassy in Dar es Salaam. Sweden's first resident ambassador was the deputy director (kansliråd) at the Swedish Foreign Ministry Sven Fredrik Hedin, who presented his credentials to President Julius Nyerere at the State House on 24 October of the same year.

Since 1968, Sweden's ambassador to Tanzania has been concurrently accredited to neighboring countries: Burundi (2018–present), Comoros (1977–1981), Madagascar (1999–2010), Mozambique (1975–1977), and Somalia (1971–1979). The ambassador is also accredited to the East African Community (EAC).

== List of representatives ==
Name	Period	Title	Resident / Concurrent accreditation	Notes	Presented credentials	Ref
Knut Granstedt	1963–1967	Chargé d'affaires ad interim (Note: He held the following diplomatic ranks: first embassy secretary (1963–66), embassy counselor (1966–67))				
Otto Rathsman	1964–1966	Ambassador	Resident in Nairobi			
Carl Gustaf Béve	1966–1968	Ambassador	Resident in Nairobi			
Lennart Hennings	1967–1968	Chargé d'affaires ad interim (Note: Held the diplomatic rank of embassy counselor.)				
Sven Fredrik Hedin	1968–1973	Ambassador	Accredited to Mogadishu (from 1971)		24 October 1968	
Knut Granstedt	1973–1977	Ambassador	Accredited to Maputo (from 1975) and Mogadishu			
Lennart Eckerberg	1977–1979	Ambassador	Accredited to Mogadishu and Moroni			
David Wirmark	1979–1985	Ambassador	Accredited to Moroni (until 1981)			
Per Jödahl	1985–1989	Ambassador				
Anders Oljelund	1989–1992	Ambassador				
Thomas Palme	1993–1998	Ambassador				
Sten Rylander	1998–2003	Ambassador	Accredited to Antananarivo (from 1999)			
Torvald Åkesson	2003–2007	Ambassador	Accredited to Antananarivo			
Staffan Herrström	2007–2010	Ambassador	Accredited to Antananarivo			
Lennarth Hjelmåker	2010–2015	Ambassador				
Katarina Rangnitt	2015–2018	Ambassador	Accredited to Bujumbura (from 2018)			
Anders Sjöberg	September 2018 – 2022	Ambassador	Accredited to Bujumbura			
Charlotta Ozaki Macias	August 2022 – 2026	Ambassador	Accredited to Bujumbura		25 August 2022	
Ingrid Johansson	August 2026 – present	Ambassador				
