= List of ambassadors of Sweden to Guyana =

Ambassador of Sweden to Guyana
- Lesser coat of arms of the Kingdom of Sweden
- Incumbent; Maria Velasco since 2025
- Ministry for Foreign Affairs; Swedish Embassy, Caribbean
- Style: His or Her Excellency (formal); Mr. or Madam Ambassador (informal)
- Reports to: Minister for Foreign Affairs
- Seat: Stockholm, Sweden (Note: The Swedish ambassador to Guyana is resident in Stockholm, Sweden.)
- Appointer: Government of Sweden
- Term length: No fixed term
- Inaugural holder: Hans Ewerlöf
- Formation: 1976

The Ambassador of Sweden to Guyana (known formally as the Ambassador of the Kingdom of Sweden to the Co-operative Republic of Guyana) is the official representative of the government of Sweden to the president of Guyana and government of Guyana. Since Sweden does not have an embassy in Georgetown, Sweden's ambassador to Guyana is resident in Stockholm, Sweden.

== History ==
Guyana achieved independence from the United Kingdom as a dominion on 26 May 1966 and became a republic on 23 February 1970, remaining a member of the Commonwealth. Guyana and Sweden established diplomatic relations on 16 June 1975.

In 1976, Sweden's ambassador to Venezuela, Hans Ewerlöf, resident in Caracas, was concurrently accredited to Guyana. Between 1980 and 1995, accreditation was entrusted to a Stockholm-based ambassador-at-large responsible for the Caribbean region, including Guyana. In 1997, responsibility for accreditation reverted to the Swedish ambassador in Caracas. Following the closure of the Swedish Embassy in Caracas in 2000, accreditation has again been carried out by a Stockholm-based ambassador-at-large for the Caribbean region.

== List of representatives ==
Name	Period	Title	Notes	Presented credentials	Ref
Hans Ewerlöf	1976–1979	Ambassador	Resident in Caracas.		
Erik Tennander	1980–1985	Ambassador	Resident in Stockholm.		
Lennart Klackenberg	1986–1995	Ambassador	Resident in Stockholm.		
–	1996–1996	Ambassador	Vacant.		
Magnus Nordbäck	1997–2000	Ambassador	Resident in Caracas.		
Hans Linton	2000–2004	Ambassador	Resident in Stockholm.		
Sten Ask	2004–2010	Ambassador	Resident in Stockholm.		
Claes Hammar	2010–2016	Ambassador	Resident in Stockholm.	3 May 2011	
Elisabeth Eklund	2017–2022	Ambassador	Resident in Stockholm.	16 August 2017	
Anders Bengtcén	2023–2025	Ambassador	Resident in Stockholm.	27 February 2023	
Maria Velasco	2025–present	Ambassador	Resident in Stockholm.	8 December 2025	
