= Erik Tennander =

Swedish diplomat (1919–2007)

- Born: Sten Erik Tennander; 22 September 1919; Gothenburg, Sweden
- Died: 19 April 2007 (aged 87); Denmark
- Education: Djursholms samskola
- Alma mater: Stockholm University College
- Occupation: Diplomat
- Years active: 1942–1985
- Spouse(s): Barbara Kirk (m. 1945; died 1962) Britt Oldenburg (m. 1966)
- Children: 2

Sten Erik Tennander (22 September 1919 – 19 April 2007) was a Swedish diplomat. He joined the Ministry for Foreign Affairs in 1942 and served early postings in Chicago, San Francisco, Lima, and Caracas. After assignments in Buenos Aires and senior roles within the ministry, he became embassy counsellor in The Hague and later served as chargé d'affaires ad interim in Quito.

He was appointed embassy counselor to Buenos Aires in 1970 and to Copenhagen in 1975, receiving the rank of minister in 1980. That same year he became ambassador-at-large for the Caribbean region, based in Stockholm, and from 1980 to 1985 represented Sweden in several Caribbean and Central American capitals.

== Early life ==
Tennander was born on 22 September 1919 in Gothenburg, Sweden, the son of Chief Engineer Sten Tennander (1894–1965) and Karin, née Wigström (1893–1940). His father was chief engineer at the Stockholm Electricity Authority. He was the half-brother of the composer and lyricist Lasse Tennander (born 1945).

Erik Tennander passed studentexamen at Djursholms samskola on 11 May 1938 and earned a degree in political science and law at Stockholm University College on 24 April 1941.

In January 1939, Tennander was one of the winners among 800 Swedish students in an English essay competition announced the previous year by the British Council in London.

== Career ==
Tennander joined the Ministry for Foreign Affairs as an attaché in 1942 and served in Chicago, San Francisco, Lima, and Caracas between 1942 and 1948. He was appointed second secretary at the ministry from 1948 to 1951, after which he served as legation secretary in Buenos Aires in 1951 and was promoted to first legation secretary there in 1952. In 1956 he became first secretary at the Ministry for Foreign Affairs.

He was appointed embassy counsellor in The Hague in 1962, director at the ministry in 1963, and head of department in 1964. From 1967 to 1970 he served as embassy counsellor and chargé d'affaires ad interim in Quito. He was subsequently appointed embassy counselor to Buenos Aires in 1970 and to Copenhagen in 1975, and in 1980 he was granted the rank of minister.

In August 1980, Tennander was appointed ambassador-at-large for the countries in and around the Caribbean Sea, while remaining based at the Ministry for Foreign Affairs in Stockholm. He assumed responsibility from the Swedish ambassador in Caracas, who had previously been concurrently accredited to several of those countries. From 1980 to 1985 he served as ambassador to Santo Domingo, Georgetown, Paramaribo, Port-au-Prince, and St. George's. He was also ambassador to Belmopan from 1982 to 1985 and to Castries from 1983 to 1985.

== Personal life ==
On 17 June 1945, at St. Clement's Church in Berkeley, California, Tennander married Barbara Kirk (1918–1962) of Berkeley, daughter of Mr. and Mrs. B. N. Kirk of Visalia, California. They had two sons: Rolf (born 1948) and Sten Northrop (1956–2016).

In 1966, he married Britt Oldenburg (born 1938), the daughter of the Director-General of Naval Construction (marinöverdirektör) Ivar Oldenburg and Margareta (née Lindberg).

In the final years of his life, Tennander was resident in Skodsborg, Denmark.

== Death ==
Tennander died on 19 April 2007 in Denmark.

== Awards and decorations ==
- (Argentina) Officer of the Order of the Liberator General San Martín
- (Iran) Officer of the Order of the Crown
- (Japan) 4th Class of the Order of the Sacred Treasure
- Officer of the Order of the Sun of Peru

Diplomatic posts
Preceded by Hans Ewerlöf	Ambassador of Sweden to Haiti; 1980–1985	Succeeded by Lennart Klackenberg
Preceded by Hans Ewerlöf	Ambassador of Sweden to the Dominican Republic; 1980–1985	Succeeded by Lennart Klackenberg
Preceded by Hans Ewerlöf	Ambassador of Sweden to Guyana; 1980–1985	Succeeded by Lennart Klackenberg
Preceded by Hans Ewerlöf	Ambassador of Sweden to Suriname; 1980–1985	Succeeded by Lennart Klackenberg
Preceded by None	Ambassador of Sweden to Grenada; 1980–1985	Succeeded by Lennart Klackenberg
Preceded by None	Ambassador of Sweden to Belize; 1982–1985	Succeeded by Lennart Klackenberg
Preceded by None	Ambassador of Sweden to Saint Lucia; 1983–1985	Succeeded by Lennart Klackenberg
