= Swedish overseas trade during World War II =

From the German capture of Denmark and Norway, the Swedish overseas trade during World War II was mainly blocked by the battle of the Atlantic, but Swedish diplomats convinced Germany and the United Kingdom to let through a few vessels, mainly to the United States until their entrance into the war, and neutral countries in Latin America. These transports, called lejdtrafiken, "the safe conduct traffic", were monitored by both powers, and ten of them were sunk during the war. Sweden mainly imported petroleum products and agricultural produce, and exported wood products. Overall, petrol imports to Sweden greatly decreased, and substitute fuels were found.

Sweden traded considerable goods with Germany during the war, particularly iron, iron products, ball bearings, and trucks. Though Sweden purchased American manufactured military aircraft early in the war, sales became prohibited by the US government in 1940. As a result Sweden bought 200 planes from Italy instead. As the war progressed, strategic products such as rubber and metals were prohibited.

Import from Sweden to the United Kingdom was organised in several blockade-running operations such as Operation Rubble (January 1941), Operation Performance (March 1942) and Operation Bridford (October 1943 to March 1944). Historian Christian Leitz says that Sweden violated their neutrality by offering the United Kingdom ball bearings at a discount. In 1938 SKF only charged the UK 74% of what they charged Germany and in 1943 only 68%, whereas historian Eric Bernard Golson says that neutral powers such as Sweden maintained their neutrality and independence by offering economic concessions to the wartime powers to make up for their relative military weakness.

== See also ==
- Sweden during World War II
- Swedish iron-ore mining during World War II
