= National Institute of Economic Research (Sweden) =

Swedish government agency

The Swedish National Institute of Economic Research (Swedish: Konjunkturinstitutet, KI or NIER) is a government agency in Sweden responsible for economic analysis and forecasting. The NIER is publicly funded, although it does accept a small number of private commissions. It employs over 60 people, primarily economists.
