= List of ambassadors of Sweden to Venezuela =

Ambassador of Sweden to Venezuela
- Lesser coat of arms of the Kingdom of Sweden
- Ministry for Foreign Affairs; Swedish Embassy, Bogotá
- Style: His or Her Excellency (formal); Mr. or Madam Ambassador (informal)
- Reports to: Minister for Foreign Affairs
- Residence: Quinta »Shangri-La», Prolongación Avenida Principal, Caracas Country Club
- Seat: Bogotá, Colombia (Note: Since 2000, the Swedish ambassador in Bogotá, Colombia has a dual accreditation to Caracas.)
- Appointer: Government of Sweden
- Term length: No fixed term
- Inaugural holder: Einar Modig
- Formation: 1931

The Ambassador of Sweden to Venezuela (known formally as the Ambassador of the Kingdom of Sweden to the Bolivarian Republic of Venezuela) is the official representative of the government of Sweden to the president of Venezuela and government of Venezuela. The Swedish envoy initially resided in Lima, Peru, with dual accreditation to Caracas, Venezuela. In 1948, a resident envoy was appointed, and the position was elevated to ambassador in 1959. The ambassador was also accredited to various neighboring countries. Following the closure of the embassy in 2000, responsibility for Venezuela was transferred to the Swedish ambassador in Bogotá, Colombia.

== History ==
In a report on the reorganization of the Ministry for Foreign Affairs in early January 1921, the experts recommended a proposal from the Swedish chargé d'affaires in Mexico to extend the mission's area of responsibility to the Central American states, British Honduras, as well as Cuba, Venezuela, Colombia, Haiti, and San Domingo, along with the British, French, Dutch, and American possessions in the West Indies.

On 30 June 1930, Einar Modig was appointed as Sweden's first minister accredited to Venezuela, though stationed in Lima, Peru. He assumed office on 1 January 1931. Simultaneously, Albert Winqvist was appointed as legation counsellor with a specific focus on Colombia and Venezuela. Based in Bogotá, Winqvist also served as chargé d'affaires ad interim in Caracas and Bogotá during periods when the minister was absent.

From 1948, Sweden's ambassador to Venezuela was concurrently accredited to neighboring countries: Barbados (1976–1996), Cuba (1951–1963), Dominican Republic (1951–1979), Guyana (1976–1979, 1997–2000), Haiti (1951–1966, 1976–1979), Suriname (1978–1979, 1997–2000), and Trinidad and Tobago (1967–2000).

In January 1959, an agreement was reached between the Swedish and Venezuelan governments on the mutual elevation of the respective countries' legations to embassies. The diplomatic rank was thereafter changed to ambassador instead of envoy extraordinary and minister plenipotentiary.

The Swedish Embassy in Caracas was closed on 30 June 2000, and replaced by an honorary consulate. Since that year, Sweden's ambassador in Bogotá has also been accredited to Caracas.

== List of representatives ==
Name	Period	Resident/Non resident	Title	Notes	Ref
State of Venezuela (1830–1864)
Fredrik Adlercreutz	3 July 1840 – 24 January 1852	Resident	Chargé d'affaires and consul general		
United States of Venezuela (1864–1953)
Einar Modig	1 January 1931 (Note: Appointed on 30 July 1930.) – 28 April 1933	Non-resident	Acting envoy	Resident in Lima.	
Albert Winqvist	1931–1936	Non-resident	Chargé d'affaires ad interim (Note: Held the diplomatic rank of legation counsellor in Bogotá, Caracas, La Paz, Lima, and Quito.)	Resident in Bogotá.	
Einar Modig	28 April 1933 – 1934	Non-resident	Envoy	Resident in Lima.	
Vilhelm Assarsson	1935–1937	Non-resident	Envoy	Resident in Lima.	
Gunnar Reuterskiöld	1936–1937	Non-resident	Legation counsellor (Note: Legation counsellor in Bogotá, Caracas, La Paz, Lima, and Quito.)		
Gunnar Reuterskiöld	1937–1938	Non-resident	Envoy	Resident in Lima.	(Note: Reuterskiöld was appointed in November 1937 according to Dagens Nyheter reporting. Sveriges statskalender indicates the year 1938, which could either be the year he took office.)
Rolf Arfwedson	1938–1938	Resident	Chargé d'affaires ad interim (Note: Held the diplomatic rank of legation counsellor in Bogotá, Caracas, La Paz, Lima, and Quito.)	Chargé d'affaires ad interim in Bogotá and Caracas.	
Albert Winqvist	1938 – 28 July 1941	Resident	Chargé d'affaires	Died in office.	
Folke Wennerberg	October 1941 – 1942	Resident	Chargé d'affaires en pied		
Nils-Eric Ekblad	1943–1948	Resident	Chargé d'affaires en pied (Note: Held the diplomatic rank of legation counsellor.)		
Fritz Stackelberg	1948–1953	Resident	Envoy	Accredited to Havana, Port-au-Prince, and Santo Domingo (all from 1951).	
Republic of Venezuela (1953–1999)
Carl-Herbert Borgenstierna	1953–1957	Resident	Envoy	Accredited to Havana, Port-au-Prince, and Santo Domingo.	
Gunnar Dryselius	1958 – January 1959	Resident	Envoy	Accredited to Havana, Port-au-Prince, and Santo Domingo.	
Gunnar Dryselius	January 1959 – 1963	Resident	Ambassador	Accredited to Havana, Port-au-Prince, and Santo Domingo.	
Knut Bernström	1963–1966	Resident	Ambassador	Accredited to Port-au-Prince and Santo Domingo.	
Otto Rathsman	1966–1970	Resident	Ambassador	Accredited to Port of Spain (from 1967) and Santo Domingo.	
Per Bertil Kollberg	1970–1975	Resident	Ambassador	Accredited to Port of Spain (from 1971) and Santo Domingo.	
Hans Ewerlöf	1976–1979	Resident	Ambassador	Accredited to Bridgetown, Georgetown, Paramaribo (from 1978), Port-au-Prince, Port of Spain, and Santo Domingo.	
Carl Gustaf von Platen	1980–1984	Resident	Ambassador	Accredited to Bridgetown and Port of Spain.	
Lars Schönander	1984–1988	Resident	Ambassador	Accredited to Bridgetown and Port of Spain.	
Karl Wärnberg	1989–1991	Resident	Ambassador	Accredited to Bridgetown and Port of Spain.	
Peter Landelius	1992–1996	Resident	Ambassador	Accredited to Bridgetown and Port of Spain (from 1991).	
Magnus Nordbäck	1997–1999	Resident	Ambassador	Accredited to Georgetown, Paramaribo, and Port of Spain.	
Bolivarian Republic of Venezuela (1999–present)
Magnus Nordbäck	1999–2000	Resident	Ambassador	Accredited to Georgetown, Paramaribo, and Port of Spain.	
Olof Skoog	2002–2004	Non-resident	Ambassador	Resident in Bogotá.	
Lena Nordström	2005–2011	Non-resident	Ambassador	Resident in Bogotá.	
Marie Andersson de Frutos	2011–2017	Non-resident	Ambassador	Resident in Bogotá.	
Tommy Strömberg	2017–2020	Non-resident	Ambassador	Resident in Bogotá.	

== See also ==
- Sweden–Venezuela relations
