= List of ambassadors of Sweden to Ecuador =

Ambassador of Sweden to Ecuador
- Lesser coat of arms of the Kingdom of Sweden
- Incumbent; Maria Cramér since 2025
- Ministry for Foreign Affairs; Swedish Embassy, Quito
- Style: His or Her Excellency (formal); Mr. or Madam Ambassador (informal)
- Reports to: Minister for Foreign Affairs
- Residence: Calle James Orton 109 (Note: Calle James Orton 109 or Calle José Orton 109 was the address of the residence in the 1960s.)
- Seat: Bogotá, Colombia (Note: The Swedish ambassador in Bogotá is also accredited in Quito.)
- Appointer: Government of Sweden
- Term length: No fixed term
- Inaugural holder: Einar Modig
- Formation: 1 January 1931

The Ambassador of Sweden to Ecuador (known formally as the Ambassador of the Kingdom of Sweden to the Republic of Ecuador) is the official representative of the government of Sweden to the president of Ecuador and government of Ecuador. The Swedish envoy initially resided in Lima, Peru, with dual accreditation to Quito, Ecuador. From 1950, the Swedish envoy in Bogotá, Colombia, was also accredited to Quito. An embassy office was opened in Quito in 1963, headed by a lower-ranking diplomat. The office was elevated to an embassy in 1978, and that same year Sweden's first resident ambassador was appointed. The embassy was closed in 1992. Since then, Sweden's ambassador in Bogotá has also been accredited to Quito.

== History ==
On 30 June 1930, Einar Modig was appointed as Sweden's first minister accredited to Ecuador, though stationed in Lima, Peru. He assumed office on 1 January 1931. From 1950, the Swedish envoy in Bogotá, Colombia, was also accredited in Quito.

A 1963 Swedish government proposal followed a review of Sweden's foreign service organization. The review recommended strengthening Sweden's diplomatic presence abroad. Regarding Ecuador, the investigation proposed appointing a paid official in Quito to serve as chargé d'affaires ad interim, under the supervision of the Swedish envoy in Bogotá, Colombia. The Swedish Export Association supported the establishment of a new representation in Quito, emphasizing that it would be beneficial from a goodwill perspective for the mission there to soon gain independent status. The government therefore proposed the creation of a permanent legation office in Quito, subordinate to the embassy in Bogotá. That same year, Hans Björk was appointed first embassy secretary and chargé d'affaires ad interim, and head of the embassy office in Quito.

In January 1978, the embassy office was elevated to an embassy, and the then chargé d'affaires ad interim, Embassy Counsellor Sven Jonsson, was appointed in May of the same year as Sweden's first resident ambassador in Quito.

On 10 September 1992, the Swedish government decided to close the embassy in Quito. The closures were part of the Ministry for Foreign Affairs’ cost-saving program. The embassy was replaced by an honorary consulate general. Diplomatic relations with Ecuador have since been handled through accreditation from the embassy in Bogotá, Colombia.

== List of representatives ==
Name	Period	Resident / Non-resident	Title	Resident / Concurrent accreditation	Notes	Presented credentials	Ref
Einar Modig	1 January 1931 (Note: Appointed on 30 July 1930.) – 28 April 1933	Non-resident	Acting envoy	Resident in Lima			
Einar Modig	28 April 1933 – 1934	Non-resident	Envoy	Resident in Lima			
Vilhelm Assarsson	1935–1937	Non-resident	Envoy	Resident in Lima			
Gunnar Reuterskiöld	1936–1937	Non-resident	Chargé d'affaires ad interim (Note: Held the diplomatic rank of legation counsellor in Bogotá, Caracas, La Paz, Lima, and Quito.)				
Gunnar Reuterskiöld	1937–1945	Non-resident	Envoy	Resident in Lima			
Martin Kastengren	1945–1951	Non-resident	Envoy	Resident in Lima			
Brynolf Eng	1950–1955	Non-resident	Envoy	Resident in Bogotá			
Leif Öhrvall	1955 – September 1956	Non-resident	Envoy	Resident in Bogotá		19 January 1956	
Leif Öhrvall	September 1956 – 1958	Non-resident	Ambassador	Resident in Bogotá			
Torsten Brandel	1958–1961	Non-resident	Ambassador	Resident in Bogotá		27 November 1958	
Curt Leijon	1961–1964	Non-resident	Ambassador	Resident in Bogotá			
Hugo Ärnfast	1964 – 11 July 1965	Non-resident	Ambassador	Resident in Bogotá	Died in office (Note: Died in drowning accident outside Bogotá.)		
Hans Björk	1963–1967	Resident	Chargé d'affaires ad interim (Note: Held the diplomatic rank of first embassy secretary.)				
Ingvar Grauers	1965–1976	Non-resident	Ambassador	Resident in Bogotá			
Erik Tennander	1967–1970	Resident	Chargé d'affaires ad interim (Note: Held the diplomatic rank of embassy counselor.)				
–	1971–1971	Resident	Chargé d'affaires ad interim		Vacant		
Ragnar Petri	1972–1976	Resident	Chargé d'affaires ad interim (Note: Held the diplomatic rank of embassy counselor.)				
Hans-Efraim Sköld	1976–1978	Non-resident	Ambassador	Resident in Bogotá			
Sven Jonsson	1976–1978	Resident	Chargé d'affaires ad interim (Note: Held the diplomatic rank of embassy counselor.)				
Sven Jonsson	1978–1980	Resident	Ambassador				
Gunnar Hultner	1980–1984	Resident	Ambassador				
Christian Bausch	1984–1989	Resident	Ambassador				
Christer Manhusen	1989–1992	Resident	Ambassador				
Sven Juhlin	1992–1996	Non-resident	Ambassador	Resident in Bogotá			
Björn Sternby	1996–2000	Non-resident	Ambassador	Resident in Bogotá			
Olof Skoog	2001–2003	Non-resident	Ambassador	Resident in Bogotá			
–	2004–2004	Non-resident	Ambassador		Vacant		
Lena Nordström	2005–2011	Non-resident	Ambassador	Resident in Bogotá			
Marie Andersson de Frutos	2011–2017	Non-resident	Ambassador	Resident in Bogotá			
Tommy Strömberg	1 September 2017 – 2020	Non-resident	Ambassador	Resident in Bogotá		May 2018	
Helena Storm	1 September 2020 – 2025	Non-resident	Ambassador	Resident in Bogotá			
Maria Cramér	2025–present	Non-resident	Ambassador	Resident in Bogotá		26 January 2026	
