= List of ambassadors of Sweden to New Zealand =

Ambassador of Sweden to New Zealand
- Lesser coat of arms of the Kingdom of Sweden
- Incumbent; Klas Molin since 2025
- Ministry for Foreign Affairs; Swedish Embassy, Canberra
- Style: His or Her Excellency (formal); Mr. or Madam Ambassador (informal)
- Reports to: Minister for Foreign Affairs
- Residence: 33 Salamanca Road, Kelburn (Note: During the period when Sweden maintained a diplomatic mission in Wellington, the ambassador's residence was located at 33 Salamanca Road in Kelburn.)
- Seat: Canberra, Australia (Note: Since 1995, following the closure of Sweden's embassy in Wellington, the Swedish ambassador based in Canberra, Australia, has been concurrently accredited to Wellington.)
- Appointer: Government of Sweden
- Term length: No fixed term
- Formation: 19 October 1951
- First holder: Martin Kastengren

The Ambassador of Sweden to New Zealand (known formally as the Ambassador of the Kingdom of Sweden to New Zealand) is the official representative of the government of Sweden to the governor-general of New Zealand and government of New Zealand. Since Sweden does not have an embassy in Wellington, Sweden's ambassador in Canberra is co-accredited in Wellington.

== History ==
In July 1949, the King in Council decided to establish diplomatic relations with New Zealand. At the same time, the existing consulate in Wellington was upgraded to a legation, and Rolf Arfwedson was appointed as the resident chargé d'affaires en pied.

In January 1951, it was reported that the Swedish diplomatic post in Wellington, New Zealand, was to be abolished. The Swedish representation in New Zealand would then be handled by the embassy in Canberra, Australia. However, right-wing and liberal party representatives in the Committee of Supply opposed this decision, advocating for the post in Wellington to be maintained for at least another year. Despite this opposition, the committee ultimately supported the plan to eliminate the post. Two years later, the post was reestablished, and in 1957, Sweden's first resident envoy in Wellington was appointed.

At a council meeting on 21 February 1964, the Swedish government decided to elevate its legation in Wellington to an embassy. In March 1964, it was reported that Sweden and New Zealand had reached an agreement to upgrade the legations in their respective capitals to embassies. Envoy Olof Kaijser thereby became the first Swedish ambassador in Wellington.

In February 1995, the Swedish government decided to close the embassy in Wellington, and it was officially closed on 1 July 1995. Since then, the Swedish ambassador in Canberra has been accredited to Wellington.

== List of representatives ==
Name	Period	Resident / Non-resident	Title	Resident / Concurrent accreditation	Notes	Presented credentials	Ref
Rolf Arfwedson	1949–1951	Resident	Chargé d'affaires en pied				
Martin Kastengren	19 October 1951 – 30 June 1957	Non-resident	Envoy	Resident in Canberra			
Bo Järnstedt	1953–1957	Resident	Chargé d'affaires ad interim				
Hans-Efraim Sköld	1954–1954	Resident	Chargé d'affaires ad interim				
Olof Ripa	1955–1955	Resident	Chargé d'affaires ad interim				
Hugo Ärnfast	1957–1960	Resident	Envoy				
Olof Ripa	1960–1962	Resident	Envoy				
Olof Kaijser	1963 – March 1964	Resident	Envoy			August 1963	
Olof Kaijser	March 1964 – 1967	Resident	Ambassador				
Karl Henrik Andersson	1967–1969	Resident	Ambassador				
Carl-Gustaf Béve	1969–1971	Resident	Ambassador				
Olof Bjurström	1971–1974	Resident	Ambassador				
Sten Aminoff	1974–1979	Resident	Ambassador				
Gunnar Gerring	1979–1982	Resident	Ambassador	Accredited to Apia, Nukuʻalofa, and Suva			
Christer Sylvén	1982–1987	Resident	Ambassador	Accredited to Apia (from 1983), Nukuʻalofa (from 1983), and Suva			
Kjell Anneling	1987–1990	Resident	Ambassador	Accredited to Apia, Nukuʻalofa, and Suva			
Hans Andén	1991–1993	Resident	Ambassador	Accredited to Apia, Avarua (from 1992), Nukuʻalofa, and Suva			
Karin Ahrland	1993–1995	Resident	Ambassador	Accredited to Apia, Avarua, Nukuʻalofa, and Suva	Political appointee (non-career diplomat)		
Göran Hasselmark	1995–2000	Non-resident	Ambassador	Resident in Canberra			
Lars-Erik Wingren	2000–2003	Non-resident	Ambassador	Resident in Canberra			
Karin Ehnbom-Palmquist	2003–2008	Non-resident	Ambassador	Resident in Canberra			
Sven-Olof Petersson	2008–2014	Non-resident	Ambassador	Resident in Canberra		11 December 2008	
Pär Ahlberger	2014–2019	Non-resident	Ambassador	Resident in Canberra			
Henrik Cederin	January 2020 – 2022	Non-resident	Ambassador	Resident in Canberra			
Pontus Melander	16 November 2022 – 2025	Non-resident	Ambassador	Resident in Canberra		16 November 2022	
Klas Molin	2025–present	Non-resident	Ambassador	Resident in Canberra		10 September 2025	

== Gallery ==
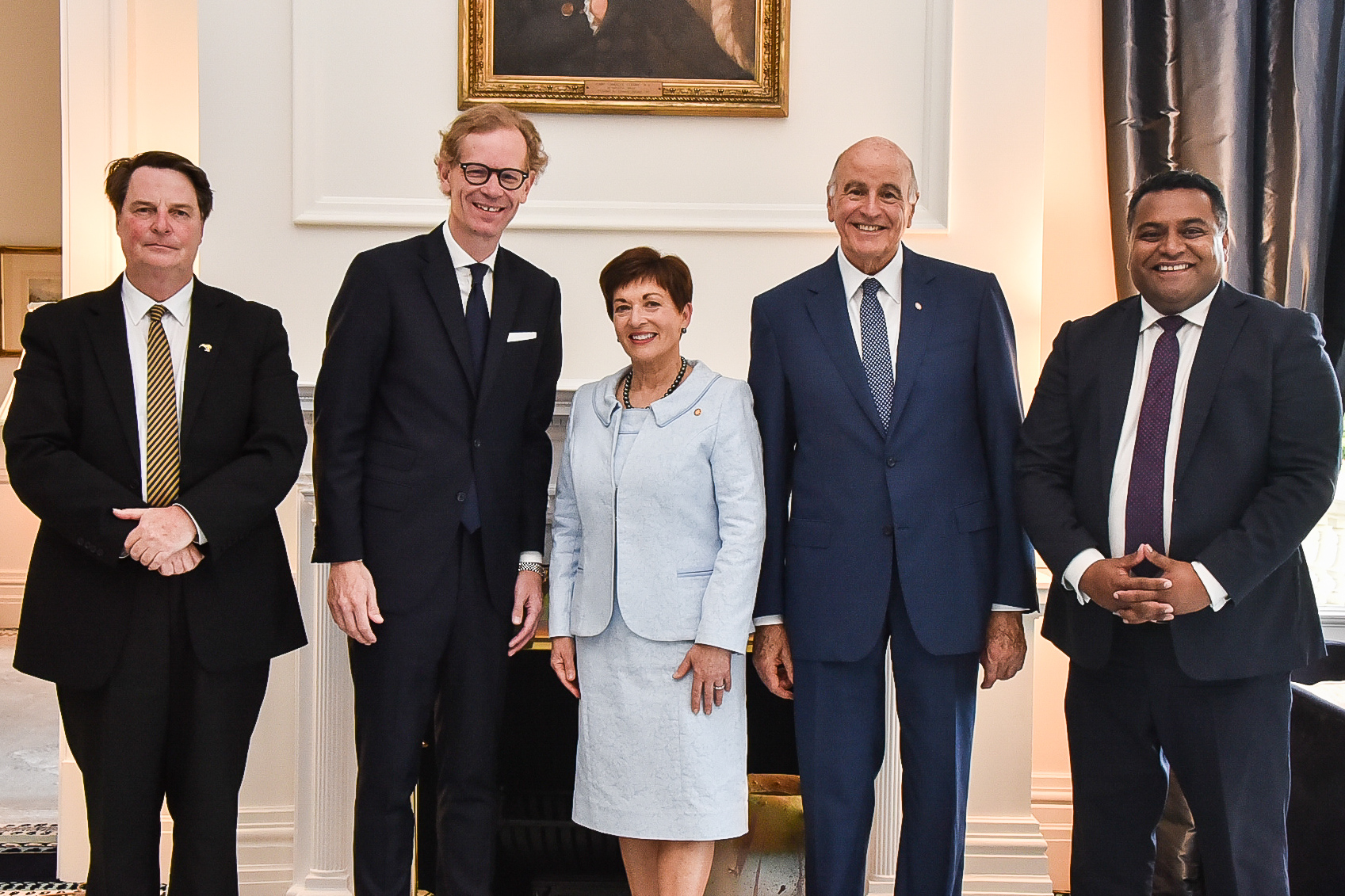
Ambassador Henrik Cederin (2020–2022) and Governor-General Patsy Reddy.

== See also ==
- New Zealand–Sweden relations
