= Olof Skoog =

Swedish diplomat (born 1962)

His Excellency Olof Skoog
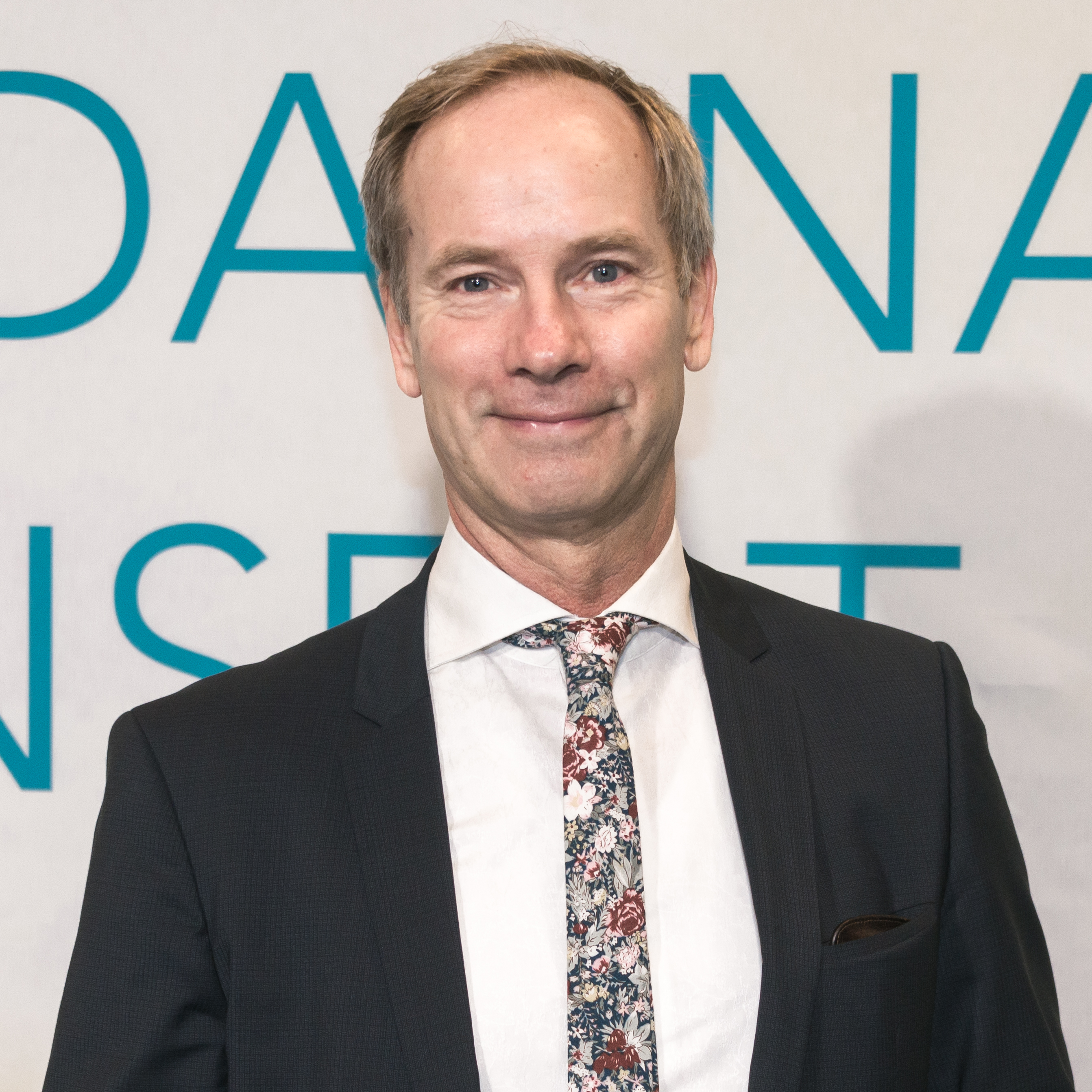

16th Sweden Ambassador to the United Nations
- In office 2015 – 2019
- Preceded by: Mårten Grunditz
- Succeeded by: Anna Karin Eneström

Sweden Ambassador to Colombia
- In office 2000–2003
- Preceded by: Björn Sternby
- Succeeded by: Lena Nordström

Sweden Ambassador to Ecuador
- In office 2000–2003
- Preceded by: Björn Sternby
- Succeeded by: Lena Nordström

Personal details
- Born: 6 September 1962
- Spouse: Johanna Brismar
- Children: 3
- Occupation: Ambassador

Björn Olof Skoog (born 6 September 1962) is a Swedish diplomat who has served as the European Union Ambassador to the UN from 2019 to 2023.

== Career ==
From March 2015 until 2019, Skoog served as Permanent Representative of Sweden to the United Nations and as the President of the United Nations Security Council for the month of January 2017 and July 2018.

Skoog served as the Swedish Ambassador to Colombia, Venezuela, Ecuador and Panama and the EU Ambassador to Indonesia, Brunei, and ASEAN.

== Other activities ==
- International Peace Institute (IPI), Member of the International Advisory Council

== Personal life ==
Skoog's wife Johanna Brismar is also a diplomat. They have three children.

Diplomatic posts
Preceded by Björn Sternby	Ambassador of Sweden to Colombia; 2000–2003	Succeeded by Lena Nordström
Preceded by Björn Sternby	Ambassador of Sweden to Ecuador; 2000–2003	Succeeded by Lena Nordström
Preceded by Magnus Nordbäck	Ambassador of Sweden to Venezuela; 2002–2003	Succeeded by Lena Nordström
Preceded by Jan Bjerninger	Ambassador of Sweden to Panama; 2000–2003	Succeeded by Lena Nordström
Preceded by Mårten Grunditz	Permanent Representative of Sweden to the United Nations; 2015–2019	Succeeded by Anna Karin Eneström
