= Gunnar Reuterskiöld =

Swedish diplomat (1893–1970)

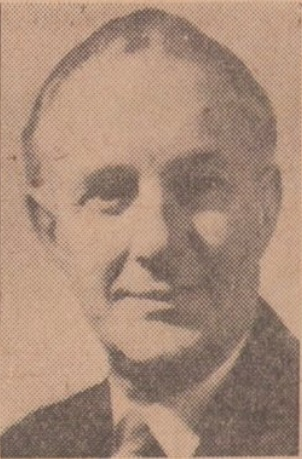
- Born: Gunnar August Casimir Reuterskiöld; 11 January 1893; Gothenburg, Sweden
- Died: 9 January 1970 (aged 76); Gothenburg, Sweden
- Education: Whitlockska samskolan
- Alma mater: Stockholm University College; Stockholm School of Economics
- Occupation: Diplomat
- Years active: 1914–1959
- Spouse: Marit Berg (m. 1932)
- Children: 2

Gunnar August Casimir Reuterskiöld (11 January 1893 – 9 January 1970) was a Swedish diplomat. After joining the Ministry for Foreign Affairs in 1916, he advanced quickly, serving in Rome, Paris, and key administrative posts in Stockholm. He later held senior positions abroad, including counsellor in Moscow and Berlin, and consul in Tallinn.

In the 1930s and 1940s, he was chargé d'affaires in Tehran and Bogotá, and envoy to Peru with concurrent accreditation to several South American countries. After World War II, he served as envoy to Yugoslavia and Belgium—becoming ambassador there in 1956—and was later appointed ambassador to Poland (1956–1959).

== Early life ==
Reuterskiöld was born into the noble family Reuterskiöld on 11 November 1893 in Gothenburg Cathedral Parish in Gothenburg, Sweden, the son of bank manager Leonard Reuterskiöld and his wife Emelie J:son Öman. He had two sisters and two brothers, one of whom was the lyricist Lennart Reuterskiöld (1898–1986).

He completed his secondary school examinations at the Whitlockska samskolan in Stockholm in May 1910. (Note: 18 May 1910 according to one source and 28 May 1910 according to another.) He then pursued studies in Germany and France, and later at Stockholm University College, where he was a student from 1911 and served as chairman of the student association from 1914 to 1916. Between 1910 and 1916, he studied at both Stockholm University College and the Stockholm School of Economics, earning his Candidate of Law degree from Stockholm University College on 15 September 1915.

== Career ==
Reuterskiöld worked at a law firm in Stockholm from 1914 to 1915 and then served at the Stockholm City Court from 1915 to 1916. He joined the Ministry for Foreign Affairs on 5 July 1916, becoming an attaché (diplomatic trainee) at the ministry on 7 February 1917, and was posted to Rome on 24 February the same year. He was appointed acting second secretary on 31 May 1918, continuing his service as attaché in Rome. On 12 September 1919, he became acting administrative officer (byråsekreterare).

In 1920, he served as assistant secretary at the Nordic Ministerial Meeting in Kristiania (now Oslo) and as notary for the Riksdag's special committee handling Sweden's accession to the League of Nations. On 27 February 1920, he was appointed acting second legation secretary in Paris, and on 6 May 1921, he became second legation secretary on special duty at the Ministry for Foreign Affairs. Later that year, on 18 December 1921, he was promoted to first legation secretary and, between 16 December 1921 and 28 August 1922, served as acting director (byråchef) at the ministry.

He was secretary to the Swedish delegation at the Genoa Economic and Financial Conference in 1922, secretary to the minister for foreign affairs from 1922 to 1923, and deputy secretary of the Advisory Council on Foreign Affairs in 1923 and 1924. He was acting director at the ministry from 2 February to 27 June 1924, and subsequently served as counsellor at the legation in Moscow from 27 June 1924. He became consul in Tallinn) on 9 December 1927 and counsellor at the legation in Berlin on 2 May 1930.

Reuterskiöld later served as chargé d’affaires ad interim in Tehran from 1934 to 1936 and in Bogotá from 1936 to 1937. From 1937 to 1945, he was envoy to Peru, with concurrent accreditation to Bolivia, Colombia (until 1943), Ecuador, and Venezuela (until 1938). He then served as envoy to Yugoslavia from 1945 to 1948, to Belgium from 1948 to 1956 (becoming ambassador in 1956) with concurrent accreditation to Luxembourg from 1948 to 1956, and finally as ambassador to Poland from 1956 to 1959.

== Personal life ==
In 1932, Reuterskiöld married Marit Berg (1901–1996), the daughter of the wholesaler Edvard Berg and Clarita Krüger. They had two children: Claes (born 1936) and Viveca (born 1938).

== Death ==
Reuterskiöld died on 9 January 1970 in Vasa Parish in Gothenburg, Sweden. The funeral service was held on 23 January 1970 at Saint Matthew's Chapel (S:t Lukas Kapell) at the Western Cemetery in Gothenburg.

== Awards and decorations ==
=== Swedish ===
- (Sweden) Commander Grand Cross of the Order of the Polar Star (21 november 1958)
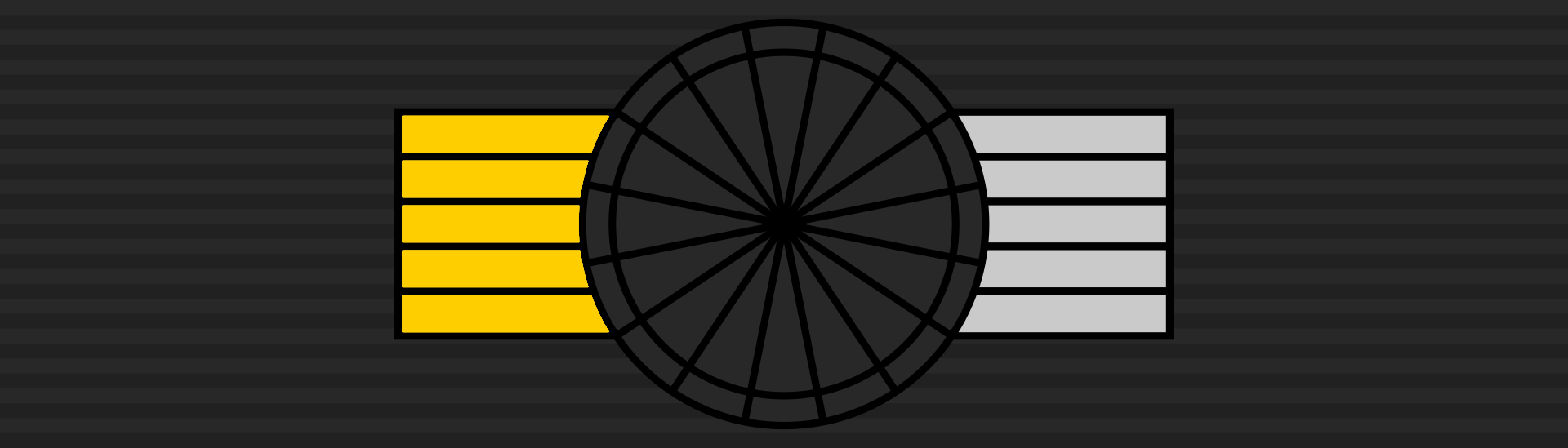
- (Sweden) Commander 1st Class of the Order of the Polar Star (6 June 1940)
- (Sweden) Knight of the Order of the Polar Star (16 June 1928)

=== Foreign ===
- (Belgium) Grand Cross of the Order of the Crown
- (Ecuador) Grand Cross of the National Order of Merit
- (Luxembourg) Grand Cross of the Order of Adolphe of Nassau
- (Luxembourg) Grand Cross of the Order of the Oak Crown
- Grand Cross of the Order of the Sun of Peru
- (French protectorate of Tunisia) Grand Officer of the Order of Glory
- (Kingdom of Iraq) 3rd Class of the Order of the Two Rivers
- (Pahlavi dynasty) Commander of the Order of Homayoun
- (Netherlands) Officer of the Order of Orange-Nassau (1922)
- (Norway) Knight 1st Class of the Order of St. Olav
- (Norway) Knight of the Order of St. Olav (1920)
- (Italy) Knight of the Order of Saints Maurice and Lazarus (1918)
- (France) Knight of the Legion of Honour (1920)
- (French protectorate of Tunisia) 1st Class of the Order of Glory (1920)
- (Kingdom of Prussia) 2nd and 3rd Class of the Red Cross Medal

== Footnotes ==
Diplomatic posts
Preceded by Birger Johansson	Consul of Sweden in Tallinn; 1927–1930	Succeeded by Anders Koskull
Preceded by Vilhelm Assarsson	Envoy of Sweden to Peru; 1937–1945	Succeeded by Martin Kastengren
Preceded by Vilhelm Assarsson	Envoy of Sweden to Bolivia; 1937–1945	Succeeded by Martin Kastengren
Preceded by Vilhelm Assarsson	Envoy of Sweden to Ecuador; 1937–1945	Succeeded by Martin Kastengren
Preceded by Vilhelm Assarsson	Envoy of Sweden to Colombia; 1937–1943	Succeeded by Rolf Arfwedson as Chargé d'affaires
Preceded by Vilhelm Assarsson	Envoy of Sweden to Venezuela; 1937–1938	Succeeded by Albert Winqvist as Chargé d'affaires
Preceded by Folke Malmar	Envoy of Sweden to Yugoslavia; 1945–1948	Succeeded by Birger Johansson
Preceded by Einar Modig	Envoy/Ambassador of Sweden to Belgium; 1948–1956	Succeeded by Hugo Wistrand
Preceded by Einar Modig	Envoy of Sweden to Luxembourg; 1948–1956	Succeeded by Hugo Wistrand
Preceded by Eric von Post	Envoy/Ambassador of Sweden to Poland; 1956–1959	Succeeded by Ragnvald Bagge
