= Leif Öhrvall =

Swedish diplomat (1897–1985)

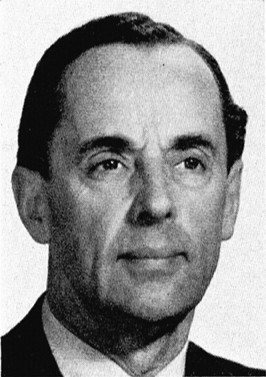
- Born: Leif Hjalmar Öhrvall; 25 January 1887; Uppsala, Sweden
- Died: 20 September 1985 (aged 88); Lidingö, Sweden
- Education: Uppsala Universitet
- Occupation: Diplomat
- Years active: 1930–1963
- Spouse: Lisa-Britta Elmström (m. 1937)
- Children: 3
- Relatives: Hubert de Bèsche (co-father-in-law)

Leif Hjalmar Öhrvall (25 January 1897 – 20 September 1985) was a Swedish diplomat whose career spanned Europe, Asia, and the Americas. After joining the Swedish Ministry for Foreign Affairs in 1930, he held early postings in London, Vienna, Belgrade, and Budapest. He later served as secretary to Foreign Minister Rickard Sandler and held key positions in Bucharest, Sofia, and Lisbon. During World War II, as consul in Oslo, he gained recognition for his assistance to resistance figures, notably helping Bishop Eivind Berggrav escape capture.

After 1945, Öhrvall’s assignments included Baden-Baden, Tokyo (as head of mission), Reykjavík (where he rose to envoy), and postings in Bogotá, Panama City, and Quito. His final appointment was as Sweden’s envoy and ambassador in Dublin (1958–1963). Beyond his diplomatic service, he was a board member of the Hugo Alfvén Foundation from 1965.

== Early life ==
Öhrvall was born on 25 January 1897 in Uppsala, Sweden, the son of Professor Hjalmar Öhrwall and Elise Axelson. He completed his studentexamen in 1915, earned a Bachelor of Arts degree in 1919, and a law degree in 1929, all from Uppsala University.

== Career ==
Öhrvall began his diplomatic career in 1930 as an attaché at the Swedish Ministry for Foreign Affairs. He served in London in 1931, followed by postings in Vienna, Belgrade, and Budapest in 1933. In 1934 he became acting second secretary at the Ministry, later serving as secretary to the Minister for Foreign Affairs Rickard Sandler (1934–35). He was second legation secretary in Bucharest and Sofia in 1937, chargé d'affaires in Lisbon from 1938 to 1941, first vice-consul in Oslo in 1941, and consul there from 1944. During his years in occupied Norway he became known as “Norway’s best friend” after personally helping the disguised and fugitive bishop Eivind Berggrav reach safety.

After the war, Öhrvall’s career continued to take him across the globe. He returned to serve at the Ministry in 1945, became consul in Baden-Baden in 1947, and from 1948 to 1951 served as legation counsellor and head of mission in Tokyo as Sweden’s diplomatic representative. He was chargé d’affaires in Reykjavík in 1951, promoted to envoy there in 1953, and later posted to Bogotá, Panama City, and Quito in 1955, before his final posting as envoy and ambassador in Dublin from 1958 to 1963.

From 1965, he was also a board member of the Hugo Alfvén Foundation (Hugo Alfvénstiftelsen).

== Personal life ==
On 20 August 1937, at the Capitoline Hill in Rome, Italy Öhrvall married Lisa-Britta Elmström (born 1914), daughter of fund manager Ejnar Elmström and Lisa Bagge. They had three children: a son, Jan, and a daughter, Marianne, as well as another son who died at a young age in 1947.

Through his son Jan’s marriage to Gunilla de Bèsche, Öhrvall became co-father-in-law to Ambassador Hubert de Bèsche.

== Death ==
Öhrvall died on 20 September 1985 in Lidingö. A memorial service took place in Saint Erik's Chapel on 26 September 1985. He was interred on 29 November 1985 at Uppsala Old Cemetery in his hometown of Uppsala.

== Awards and decorations ==
- (Sweden) Commander of the Order of the Polar Star (10 November 1962)
- (Sweden) Knight of the Order of the Polar Star (1948)
- (Colombia) Grand Cross of the Order of San Carlos
- (Iceland) Grand Cross of the Order of the Falcon (22 April 1954)
- Commander of the Order of the Lion of Finland
- (Norway) Commander of the Order of St. Olav
- (Portugal) Commander of the Military Order of Christ
- (Netherlands) Officer of the Order of Orange-Nassau
- (Czechoslovakia) Officer of the Order of the White Lion
- (Belgium) Knight of the Order of the Crown
- Knight of the Order of the White Rose of Finland
- (Japan) Order of the Rising Sun

Diplomatic posts
Preceded by Lennart Rappe as Chargé d'affaires ad interim	Chargé d'affaires of Sweden to Portugal; 1938–1941	Succeeded by Johan Beck-Friis as Envoy
Preceded by None	Diplomatic representative of Sweden to Japan; 1948–1951	Succeeded by Karl-Gustav Lagerfelt
Preceded by Harald Pousette	Envoy of Sweden to Iceland; 1953–1955	Succeeded by Sten von Euler-Chelpin
Preceded by Brynolf Eng	Envoy/Ambassador of Sweden to Colombia; 1955–1958	Succeeded by Torsten Brandel
Preceded by Brynolf Eng	Envoy/Ambassador of Sweden to Ecuador; 1955–1958	Succeeded by Torsten Brandel
Preceded by Brynolf Eng	Envoy/Ambassador of Sweden to Panama; 1955–1958	Succeeded by Torsten Brandel
Preceded by Folke Wennerberg	Envoy/Ambassador of Sweden to Ireland; 1958–1963	Succeeded by Nils-Eric Ekblad
