= Einar Modig =

Swedish diplomat (1883–1960)

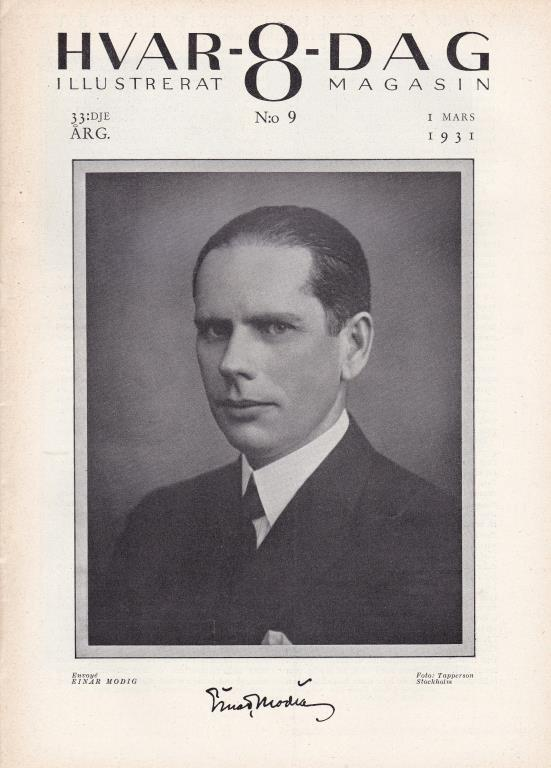
- Modig on the cover of Hvar-8-Dag no. 9, 1931.
- Born: 28 November 1883; Stockholm, Sweden
- Died: 10 March 1960 (aged 76); Stockholm, Sweden
- Education: Uppsala University
- Occupation: Diplomat
- Years active: 1907–1954
- Spouse: Maina Tanninen (m. 1911)
- Children: 3

Einar Modig (28 November 1883 – 10 March 1960) was a Swedish diplomat. After graduating from Uppsala University in 1907, Moding joined the Swedish Ministry for Foreign Affairs. He served eight years in South America as envoy in various country and during World War II, Moding served as Swedish envoy in Ankara and Athens. After the war, he served as envoy in Brussels and Luxembourg City.

== Early life ==
Modig was born on 28 November 1883 in Stockholm, Sweden, the son of Otto Walfrid Modig, an accountant, and his wife Maria Fredrika Lovisa Landgren. He passed mogenhetsexamen at Nya Elementarskolan in Stockholm on 15 May 1901 and enrolled at Uppsala University the same year. Modig received a Bachelor of Arts degree from Uppsala University in 1903, a Licentiate of Philosophy degree in 1905 and a Candidate of Law degree in 1907 before becoming an attaché at the Ministry for Foreign Affairs the same year.

== Career ==
Modig served as attaché in Kristiania in 1907 and in Antwerp and Berlin in 1908. He was back in Sweden serving as a second secretary at the Foreign Ministry in 1910. He was acting secretary in the National Board of Trade from 1911 to 1914. He was secretary in the trade council in 1912 and secretary in the National Board of Trade from 1913 to 1914 and secretary of the board of directors of the 1915 exhibition in San Francisco from 1913 to 1915.

He was extra rapporteur in the Ministry of Finance from 1914 to 1915 and a member of the State Trade Commission in 1915 as well as vice CEO of Sydsvenska kreditaktiebolaget in 1916 and vice CEO and board member of the Nordiska Kompaniet from 1916 to 1922. Modig was then chairman of the Service Commission of the Swedish Customs Service from 1922 to 1924 and had assignments in Europe and United States for Grängesbergsbolaget from 1925 to 1926. He was Sweden's representative at the diplomatic conference on the suspension of import and export bans in Geneva from 1927 to 1928 and chairman of the board of the merchant navy pension institution (Handelsflottans pensionsanstalt). Modig was also chairman of the Baltic freight transport conference in Stockholm in 1929. Modig was State Secretary and Director-General for Administrative Affairs in the Ministry of Commerce and Industry from 1926 to 1930. He was then envoy in Lima from 1931 to 1934 and at the same time non-resident envoy in La Paz, Quito, Bogotá and Caracas.

Modig was envoy in Buenos Aires and at the same time non-resident envoy in Santiago, Montevideo and Asunción from 1934 to 1939 and was he chairman of the 1939 Trade Commission from 1939 to 1941 and in the Swedish delegation in trade negotiations with Italy in 1940. He was then envoy in Ankara and non-resident envoy Athens from 1939 to 1945 but he didn't take office until 1941. Modig was envoy in Brussels from 1945 to 1948 and as non-resident envoy in Luxembourg City from 1946 to 1948 and then served at the Foreign Ministry in Stockholm. He was chairman of the delegation in trade negotiations with the Soviet Union with several countries from 1948, chairman and head of the Foreign Capital Control Office (Flyktkapitalbyrån) from 1945 to 1946 and chairman of the committee of the Chicago Fair in 1949. Modig was a board member of the Jungnerbolagen from 1948, chairman there in 1952 and was chairman of the Exports Association (Exportföringen) study delegation in Africa from 1952 to 1953 and in Colombia in 1954.

== Personal life ==
In 1911 he married Maina Tanninen (1892–1984), the daughter of the wholesaler Max Tanninen and Maria Makowski. Their son, Jan-Otto Modig (1914–2005), was CEO of Tidningarnas Telegrambyrå and vice CEO of Sveriges Radio.

== Death ==
Modig died on 10 March 1960 in Stockholm and was buried on 6 May 1960 at Norra begravningsplatsen in Stockholm.

== Awards and decorations ==
=== Swedish ===
- (Sweden) Commander Grand Cross of the Order of the Polar Star
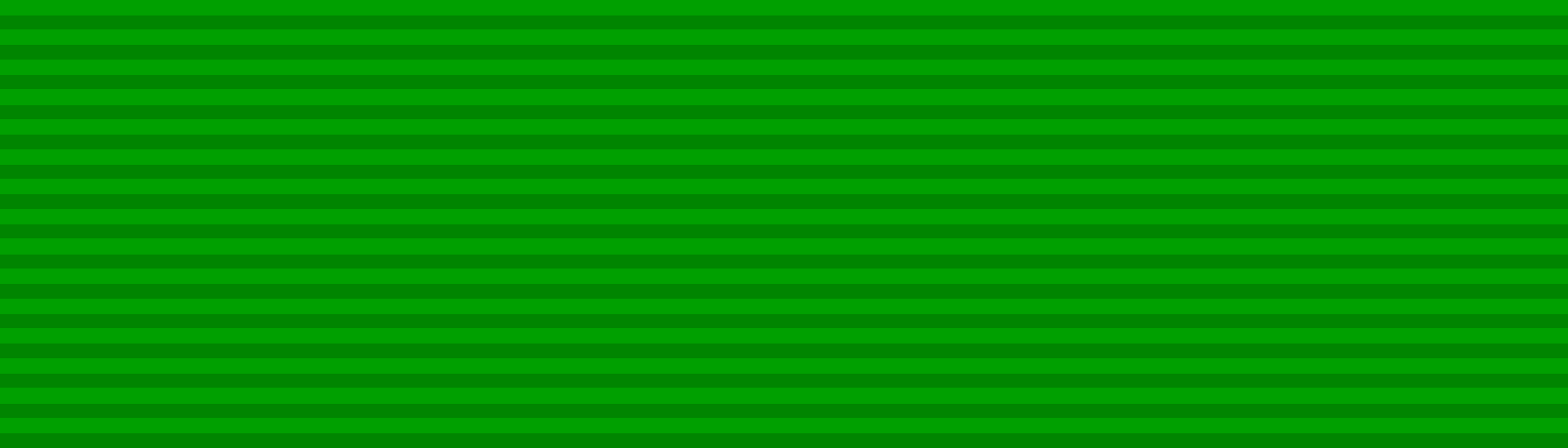
- (Sweden) Knight of the Order of Vasa

=== Foreign ===
- (Belgium) Grand Cross of the Order of the Crown
- Grand Cross of the Order of the White Rose of Finland
- (Kingdom of Italy) Grand Cross of the Order of the Crown of Italy (20 October 1941)
- (Luxembourg) Grand Cross of the Order of the Oak Crown
- Grand Cross of the Order of the Sun of Peru
- (Hungary) Grand Cross of the Hungarian Order of Merit
- (Nazi Germany) Order of the German Eagle with Star
- (Venezuela) Grand Officer of the Order of Bolivar
- (Poland) Commander 1st Class of the Order of Polonia Restituta
- (France) Officer of the Legion of Honour
- (Grand Duchy of Baden) Knight 1st Class of the Order of the Zähringer Lion
- (Kingdom of Prussia) Knight 4th Class of the Order of the Crown

== Bibliography ==
- Modig, Einar (1954). Diplomattjänst med mellanspel: en memoarbok [Diplomatic Service with interludes: a memoir] (in Swedish). Stockholm. SELIBR 127847.

Diplomatic posts
Preceded by None	Envoy of Sweden to Peru; 1931–1934	Succeeded by Vilhelm Assarsson
Preceded by None	Envoy of Sweden to Bolivia; 1931–1934	Succeeded by Vilhelm Assarsson
Preceded by None	Envoy of Sweden to Colombia; 1931–1934	Succeeded by Vilhelm Assarsson
Preceded by None	Envoy of Sweden to Ecuador; 1931–1934	Succeeded by Vilhelm Assarsson
Preceded by None	Envoy of Sweden to Venezuela; 1931–1934	Succeeded by Vilhelm Assarsson
Preceded by Christian Günther	Envoy of Sweden to Argentina; 1934–1939	Succeeded by Wilhelm Winther
Preceded by Christian Günther	Envoy of Sweden to Chile; 1934–1939	Succeeded by Axel Paulin
Preceded by Christian Günther	Envoy of Sweden to Paraguay; 1934–1939	Succeeded by Wilhelm Winther
Preceded by Christian Günther	Envoy of Sweden to Uruguay; 1934–1939	Succeeded by Wilhelm Winther
Preceded by Eric Gyllenstierna	Envoy of Sweden to Turkey; 1939–1945	Succeeded by Eric von Post
Preceded by Eric Gyllenstierna	Envoy of Sweden to Greece; 1939–1945	Succeeded by Knut Richard Thyberg
Preceded by Gunnar Hägglöf	Envoy of Sweden to Belgium; 1945–1948	Succeeded by Gunnar Reuterskiöld
Preceded by Gunnar Hägglöf	Envoy of Sweden to Luxembourg; 1946–1948	Succeeded by Gunnar Reuterskiöld
