= Sweden–Venezuela relations =

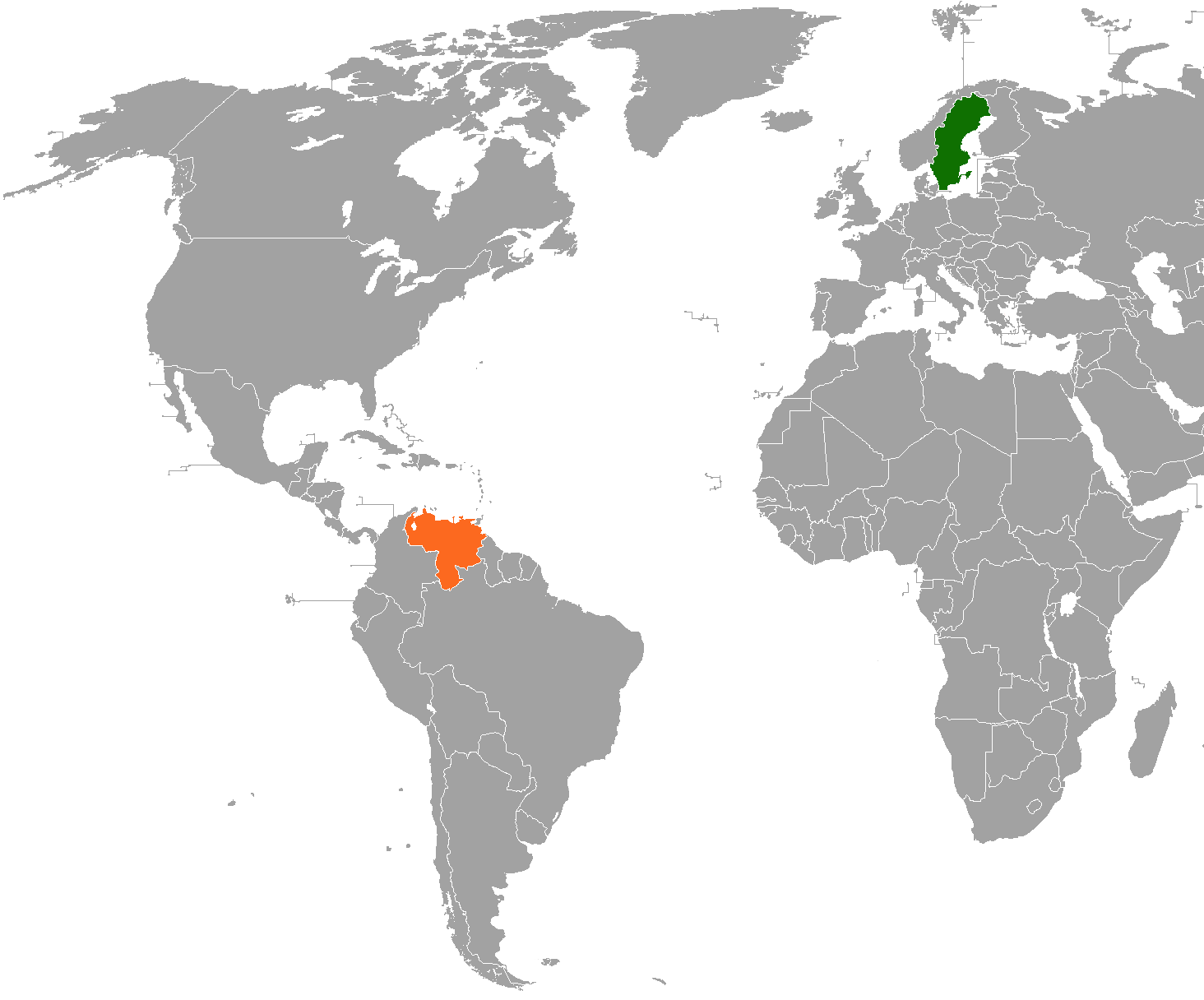
- Sweden: Venezuela

Sweden–Venezuela relations are the bilateral relations between Sweden and Venezuela.

== History ==
Sweden was among the 28 European Union countries that did not recognize the results of the 2017 Venezuelan Constituent Assembly elections. Sweden also disavowed the results of the 2018 Venezuelan presidential election, where Nicolás Maduro was declared as the winner.

In 2019, during the Venezuelan presidential crisis, Sweden recognized Juan Guaidó as president of Venezuela and pledged to assist with the delivery of humanitarian aid that year. On January 31, the European Union's High Representative for Foreign Affairs, Federica Mogherini, announced the creation of a "contact group for Venezuela" initially composed of eight European and four Latin American countries, including Sweden, which would hold its first meeting in Uruguay on February 7 and work for 90 days on the possibility of facilitating a dialogue leading to elections in Venezuela.

== Diplomatic missions ==
Sweden maintained a diplomatic mission in Caracas from the 1930s to 2000. Since then the Swedish ambassador to Venezuela is resident in Bogotá, Colombia. Sweden has honorary consulates in Caracas and Porlamar. Venezuela had an embassy in Stockholm until March 2018. The Venezuelan embassy in Sweden had been founded as a consulate in 1948, and became an embassy in 1961.

== See also ==
- Foreign relations of Sweden
- Foreign relations of Venezuela
- Negotiations during the Venezuelan crisis
