= Colombia–Sweden relations =

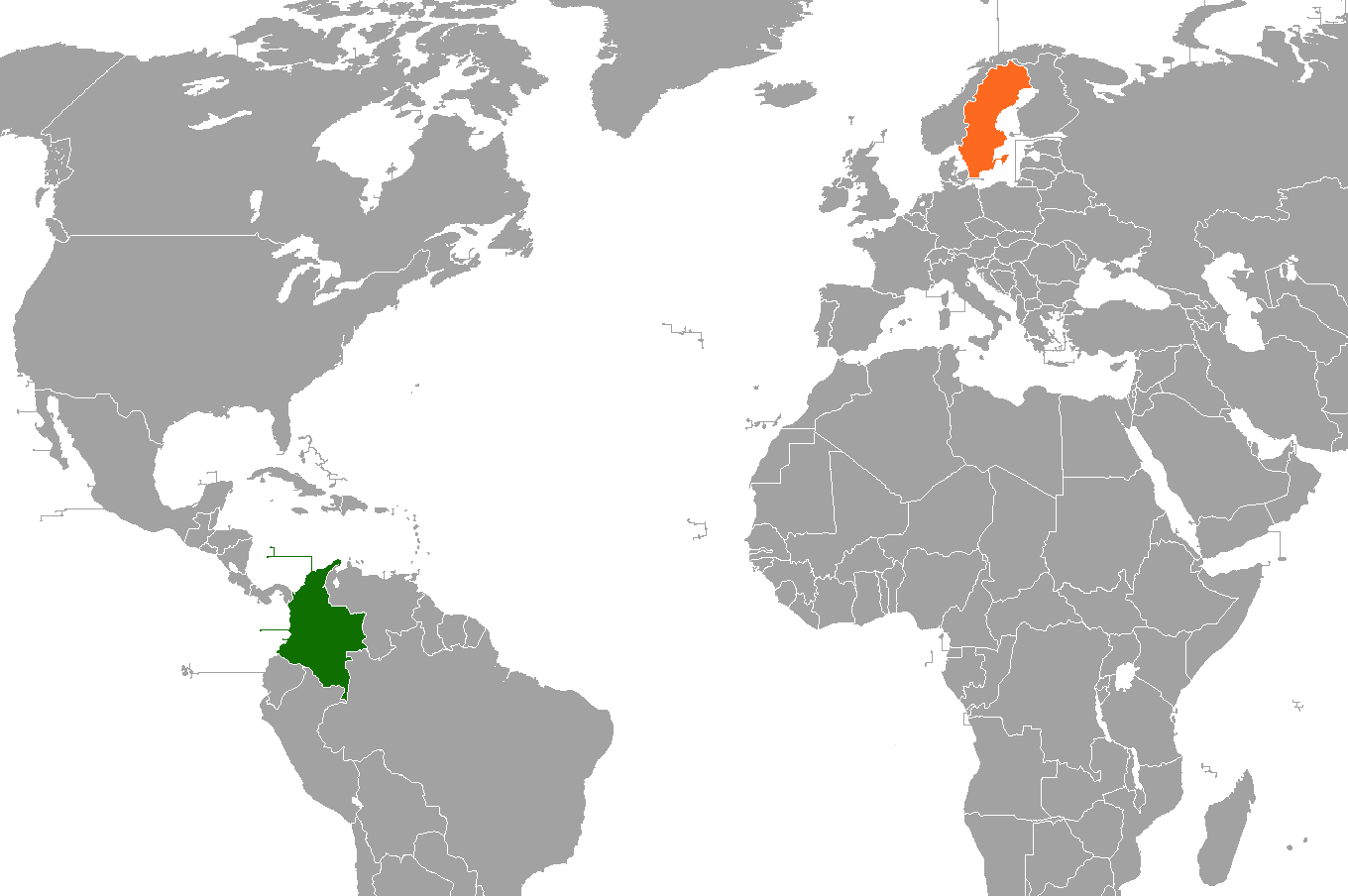
- Colombia: Sweden

Diplomatic mission
- Embassy of Colombia in Stockholm: Embassy of Sweden in Bogotá

Colombia–Sweden relations are the diplomatic relations between the Republic of Colombia and the Kingdom of Sweden. Both governments have maintained relations since the 19th century.

== History ==
Relations between the two countries were formally established on 11 December 1874. In 1929, a trade treaty was signed that is still in force today. Sweden was an important player in the Colombian peace process.

During the 1950s–70s, several Swedish diplomats encountered dramatic and sometimes tragic events while in Colombia. In June 1959, the Swedish ambassador Torsten Brandel and the American air attaché Gerald W. Crabbe were attacked by highway robbers during a car trip 40 km from Bogotá. Their car was stopped by a truck that had been placed across the road, and men from the truck surrounded the diplomats. While Crabbe kept the men at bay with his pistol, Brandel managed to turn the car around and drive away. No one was injured. On 11 July 1965, the Swedish ambassador Hugo Ärnfast died under mysterious circumstances. Officially, it was said that he had slipped in his boat during a fishing trip and drowned. In January 1972, a Swedish tour guide who had fled to Colombia with a quarter of a million kronor died. The police considered it a suicide. On 17 July 1972, the 29-year-old embassy secretary Kjell Hägglöf was murdered in central Bogotá while attempting to sell his car. In the days leading up to his death, Hägglöf had been tasked with assisting the Swedish journalist Karl Staf, who had been arrested a week earlier in a raid against the guerrilla organization FARC.

On 28 January 2025, Swedish Minister for Foreign Affairs Maria Malmer Stenergard and Colombian Acting Minister of Foreign Affairs Paola Vásquez officially launched the Colombia–Sweden Bilateral Partnership in Bogotá. Originally signed in June 2024 by Prime Minister Ulf Kristersson and President Gustavo Petro, the agreement commemorates 150 years of diplomatic relations and outlines bilateral cooperation across four main pillars: political dialogue, trade and development, climate action and green transition and peace and security.

On July 17, 2026, Sweden formalized a new development cooperation strategy with Colombia spanning 2026 through 2031, maintaining the Andean nation as a priority partner amidst a major restructuring that reduced Sweden's dedicated international aid strategies from nearly 70 to 32 countries. Entering into force retroactively on July 1, 2026, following Colombia's agreement to purchase Saab Gripen fighter jets and the Second High-Level Dialogue in Stockholm, the framework plans to mobilize approximately SEK 150 million ($16 million) annually through the Swedish International Development Cooperation Agency (Sida), alongside access to an additional SEK 75 million ($8 million) regional fund for Latin America and the Caribbean.

== High-level visits ==
High-level visits from Colombia to Sweden

- Minister of Foreign Affairs Carlos Holmes Trujillo (2019)
- President Gustavo Petro with First Lady Verónica Alcocer (2023)

== Bilateral agreements ==
Both countries have signed several bilateral agreements such as a Treaty of conciliation between the government of Colombia and the government of Sweden (1927); Treaty for the development of commercial relations between the government of Colombia and the government of Sweden (1928); Agreement on Economic, Industrial and Technical Cooperation between the Republic of Colombia and the Kingdom of Sweden (1989); Agreement between the government of the Republic of Colombia and the government of the Kingdom of Sweden authorising family members who are part of the household of members of a diplomatic mission or consular office or a mission to an international organisation to carry out paid activities (2004); Letter of intent between the Republic of Colombia and the Swedish Space Corporation and the KTH Royal Institute of Technology (2024); Memorandum of Understanding - Smart Mobility, Aviation Technologies and Road Safety (2024); Memorandum of Understanding - Sustainable and Innovative Mining Cooperation (2024); Memorandum of Understanding - Political Consultations between the Ministry of Foreign Affairs of Colombia and the Ministry of Foreign Affairs of Sweden (2024) and a Joint Declaration on Bilateral Partnership Sweden - Colombia (2024).

== Economic relations ==
Colombia exported products to Sweden worth 34 thousand dollars, the main products being coal, coffee and bananas in 2019. Meanwhile, Sweden exported products to Colombia worth 149 thousand dollars, the main products being machinery, and from the automotive and chemical sectors, also in 2019.

In 2022, Colombia exported $84.2M to Sweden. The products exported from Colombia to Sweden were made up of Coke ($33.4M), Coffee ($21.8M), and Ferroalloys ($13.1M). Sweden exported $209M to Colombia. The products exported from Sweden to Colombia included Cars ($27.4M), Nitrogenous Fertilizers ($17.8M), and Packaged Medicaments ($15.6M).

== Diplomatic representation ==
- Colombia has an embassy in Stockholm.
- Sweden has an embassy in Bogotá.

== See also ==
- Foreign relations of Colombia
- Foreign relations of Sweden
