= List of ambassadors of Sweden to Bolivia =

Ambassador of Sweden to Bolivia
- Lesser coat of arms of the Kingdom of Sweden
- Incumbent; Johanna Teague since 2024
- Ministry for Foreign Affairs; Swedish Embassy, La Paz
- Style: His or Her Excellency (formal); Mr. or Madam Ambassador (informal)
- Reports to: Minister for Foreign Affairs
- Seat: La Paz, Bolivia
- Appointer: Government of Sweden
- Term length: No fixed term
- Inaugural holder: Einar Modig
- Formation: 1 January 1931
- Website: Swedish Embassy, La Paz

The Ambassador of Sweden to Bolivia (known formally as the Ambassador of the Kingdom of Sweden to the Plurinational State of Bolivia) is the official representative of the government of Sweden to the president of Bolivia and government of Bolivia.

== History ==
On 30 June 1930, Einar Modig was appointed as Sweden's first minister accredited to Bolivia, though stationed in Lima, Peru. He assumed office on 1 January 1931. Simultaneously, Albert Winqvist was appointed as legation counsellor at the Swedish legations in the same countries. Sweden and Bolivia established relations in 1931. On 2 February 1932, Einar Modig was recognized as Sweden's first envoy extraordinary and minister plenipotentiary in Bolivia.

In July 1964, an agreement was reached between the Swedish and Bolivian governments on the mutual elevation of the respective countries' legations to embassies. The diplomatic rank was thereafter changed to ambassador instead of envoy extraordinary and minister plenipotentiary.

The Swedish ambassador to La Paz was based in Lima, Peru, for many years and held dual accreditation to Bolivia and some other nearby countries. After the Swedish embassy in Lima closed in 2001, the accreditation for La Paz was transferred to the Swedish ambassador in Buenos Aires and later to Bogotá.

In 1995, an office for Swedish development cooperation was established in La Paz, and in 2010, it was upgraded to an embassy. The embassy was headed by a chargé d'affaires ad interim until 22 July 2021, when the Swedish government decided to appoint a resident ambassador.

== List of representatives ==
Name	Period	Resident / Non-resident	Title	Resident / Concurrent accreditation	Notes	Presented credentials	Ref
Einar Modig	1 January 1931 (Note: Appointed on 30 July 1930.) – 28 April 1933	Non-resident	Acting envoy	Resident in Lima			
Einar Modig	28 April 1933 – 1934	Non-resident	Envoy	Resident in Lima			
Vilhelm Assarsson	1935–1937	Non-resident	Envoy	Resident in Lima			
Gunnar Reuterskiöld	1937–1945	Non-resident	Envoy	Resident in Lima			
Martin Kastengren	1945–1951	Non-resident	Envoy	Resident in Lima			
Harry Eriksson	1951–1952	Non-resident	Envoy	Resident in Lima			
Claes Westring	1952 – 30 June 1956	Non-resident	Envoy	Resident in Lima		7 May 1953	
Harry Bagge	1 July 1956 – 1962	Non-resident	Envoy	Resident in Santiago			
Carl Henrik Petersén	1962 – July 1964	Non-resident	Envoy	Resident in Lima			
Carl Henrik Petersén	July 1964 – 1966	Non-resident	Ambassador	Resident in Lima			
Torsten Björck	1966–1974	Non-resident	Ambassador	Resident in Lima			
Göran Engblom	1975–1978	Non-resident	Ambassador	Resident in Lima			
Ulf Norström	1979–1982	Non-resident	Ambassador	Resident in Lima			
Cai Melin	1982–1983	Non-resident	Ambassador	Resident in Lima			
Hans Linton	1984–1989	Non-resident	Ambassador	Resident in Lima			
Carl-Erhard Lindahl	1989–1992	Non-resident	Ambassador	Resident in Lima			
Lars Schönander	1992–1996	Non-resident	Ambassador	Resident in Lima			
Ulf Lewin	1996–2000	Non-resident	Ambassador	Resident in Lima			
Mikael Dahl	2000–2001	Non-resident	Ambassador	Resident in Lima			
Martin Wilkens	2002–2005	Non-resident	Ambassador	Resident in Buenos Aires. (Note: Martin Wilkens was stationed at the Swedish embassy in Buenos Aires and accredited to Asunción, La Paz, and Montevideo, but not to Buenos Aires itself. His wife, Madeleine Ströje-Wilkens, was the Swedish ambassador in Buenos Aires and accredited specifically to Buenos Aires at the time.)			
Arne Rodin	2005–2010	Non-resident	Ambassador	Resident in Buenos Aires			
Marie Andersson de Frutos	2011–2017	Non-resident	Ambassador	Resident in Bogotá		19 September 2012	
Ann Stödberg	January 2011 – August 2013	Resident	Chargé d'affaires ad interim				
Aurore Lundkvist	2013–2016	Resident	Chargé d'affaires ad interim				
Pontus Rosenberg	2016–2018	Resident	Chargé d'affaires ad interim				
Tommy Strömberg	2018–2020	Non-resident	Ambassador	Resident in Bogotá		26 December 2018	
Jörgen Persson	2019–2021	Resident	Chargé d'affaires ad interim				
Nicolas Weeks	15 August 2021 – 2024	Resident	Ambassador				
Johanna Teague	2024–2026	Resident	Ambassador				
