= List of ambassadors of Sweden to Colombia =

Ambassador of Sweden to Colombia
- Lesser coat of arms of the Kingdom of Sweden
- Incumbent; Maria Cramér since 2025
- Ministry for Foreign Affairs; Swedish Embassy, Bogotá
- Style: His or Her Excellency (formal); Mr. or Madam Ambassador (informal)
- Reports to: Minister for Foreign Affairs
- Residence: Carrera 4 no 72-55, Chapinero
- Seat: Bogotá, Colombia
- Appointer: Government of Sweden
- Term length: No fixed term
- Inaugural holder: Einar Modig
- Formation: 1 January 1931
- Website: Swedish Embassy, Bogotá

The Ambassador of Sweden to Colombia (known formally as the Ambassador of the Kingdom of Sweden to the Republic of Colombia) is the official representative of the government of Sweden to the president of Colombia and government of Colombia.

== History ==
Diplomatic relations between Sweden and Colombia were established in 1847.

In a report on the reorganization of the Ministry for Foreign Affairs in early January 1921, the experts recommended a proposal from the chargé d'affaires in Mexico to extend the mission's area of responsibility to Colombia, and the Central American states, British Honduras, as well as Cuba, Venezuela, Haiti, and San Domingo, along with the British, French, Dutch, and American possessions in the West Indies. This did not materialize on Colombia's behalf.

On 30 June 1930, Einar Modig was appointed as Sweden's first minister accredited to Venezuela, though stationed in Lima, Peru. He assumed office on 1 January 1931. Simultaneously, Albert Winqvist was appointed as legation counsellor with a specific focus on Colombia and Venezuela. Based in Bogotá, Winqvist also served as chargé d'affaires ad interim in Caracas and Bogotá during periods when the minister was absent.

In 1949, Sweden's then chargé d'affaires in Bogotá, legation counsellor Ragnvald Bagge, was promoted to envoy and was also accredited in Panama City. He thereby became Sweden's first resident envoy in Bogotá.

In September 1956, an agreement was reached between the Swedish and Colombian governments on the mutual elevation of the respective countries' legations to embassies. The diplomatic rank was thereafter changed to ambassador instead of envoy extraordinary and minister plenipotentiary.

== List of representatives ==
Name	Period	Title	Resident / Concurrent accreditation	Notes	Presented credentials	Ref
Einar Modig	1 January 1931 (Note: Appointed on 30 July 1930.) – 28 April 1933	Acting envoy	Resident in Lima			
Albert Winqvist	1931–1936	Chargé d'affaires ad interim (Note: Held the diplomatic rank of legation counsellor in Bogotá, Caracas, La Paz, Lima and Quito.)				
Einar Modig	28 April 1933 – 1934	Envoy	Resident in Lima			
Vilhelm Assarsson	1935–1937	Envoy	Resident in Lima			
Gunnar Reuterskiöld	1936–1937	Chargé d'affaires ad interim (Note: Held the diplomatic rank of legation counsellor in Bogotá, Caracas, La Paz, Lima, and Quito.)				
Gunnar Reuterskiöld	1937–1943	Envoy	Resident in Lima			
Rolf Arfwedson	1938–1938	Envoy en mission spéciale		During the change of president in Colombia in 1938		
Rolf Arfwedson	1938–1939	Chargé d'affaires ad interim (Note: Held the diplomatic rank of legation counsellor in Bogotá, Caracas, La Paz, Lima and Quito.)		Chargé d'affaires ad interim in Bogotá and Caracas		
Rolf Arfwedson	1939–1939	Chargé d'affaires				
Rolf Arfwedson	1943–1944	Chargé d'affaires				
Karl Yngve Vendel	1944–1948	Chargé d'affaires				
Ragnvald Bagge	1948–1949	Chargé d'affaires				
Ragnvald Bagge	1949–1950	Envoy	Also accredited to Panama City			
Brynolf Eng	1950–1955	Envoy	Also accredited to Panama City and Quito			
Bengt Friedman	1952–1952	Chargé d'affaires ad interim				
Leif Öhrvall	1955 – September 1956	Envoy	Also accredited to Panama City and Quito			
Leif Öhrvall	September 1956 – 1958	Ambassador	Also accredited to Panama City and Quito			
Knut Bernström	1957–1957	Chargé d'affaires ad interim				
Torsten Brandel	1958–1961	Ambassador	Also accredited to Panama City and Quito			
Curt Leijon	1961–1964	Ambassador	Also accredited to Panama City and Quito			
Hugo Ärnfast	1964 – 11 July 1965	Ambassador	Also accredited to Panama City and Quito	Died in office (Note: Died in drowning accident outside Bogotá.)		
Ingvar Grauers	1965–1976	Ambassador	Also accredited to Panama City and Quito			
Hans-Efraim Sköld	1976–1979	Ambassador	Also accredited to Panama City and Quito (until 1978 (Note: A resident ambassador in Quito was appointed in 1978.))			
Ragnar Petri	1979–1982	Ambassador	Also accredited to Panama City (from 1980)			
Karl Wärnberg	1983–1988	Ambassador	Also accredited to Panama City			
Fredrik Bergenstråhle	1989–1991	Ambassador	Also accredited to Panama City			
Sven Juhlin	1991–1996	Ambassador	Also accredited to Quito (from 1992)			
Björn Sternby	1996–2000	Ambassador	Also accredited to Quito			
Olof Skoog	2001–2003	Ambassador	Also accredited to Caracas (from 2002), Panama City, and Quito			
–	2004–2004	Ambassador		Vacant		
Lena Nordström	2005–2011	Ambassador	Also accredited to Caracas, Panama City, and Quito			
Marie Andersson de Frutos	2011–2017	Ambassador	Also accredited to Caracas, La Paz, and Quito			
Tommy Strömberg	1 September 2017 – 2020	Ambassador	Also accredited to Caracas, La Paz, and Quito		10 October 2017	
Helena Storm	1 September 2020 – 2025	Ambassador	Also accredited to Quito			
Maria Cramér	2025–present	Ambassador	Also accredited to Quito		22 October 2025	

== See also ==
- Colombia–Sweden relations
