= List of ambassadors of Sweden to Iceland =

Ambassador of Sweden to Iceland
- Lesser coat of arms of the Kingdom of Sweden

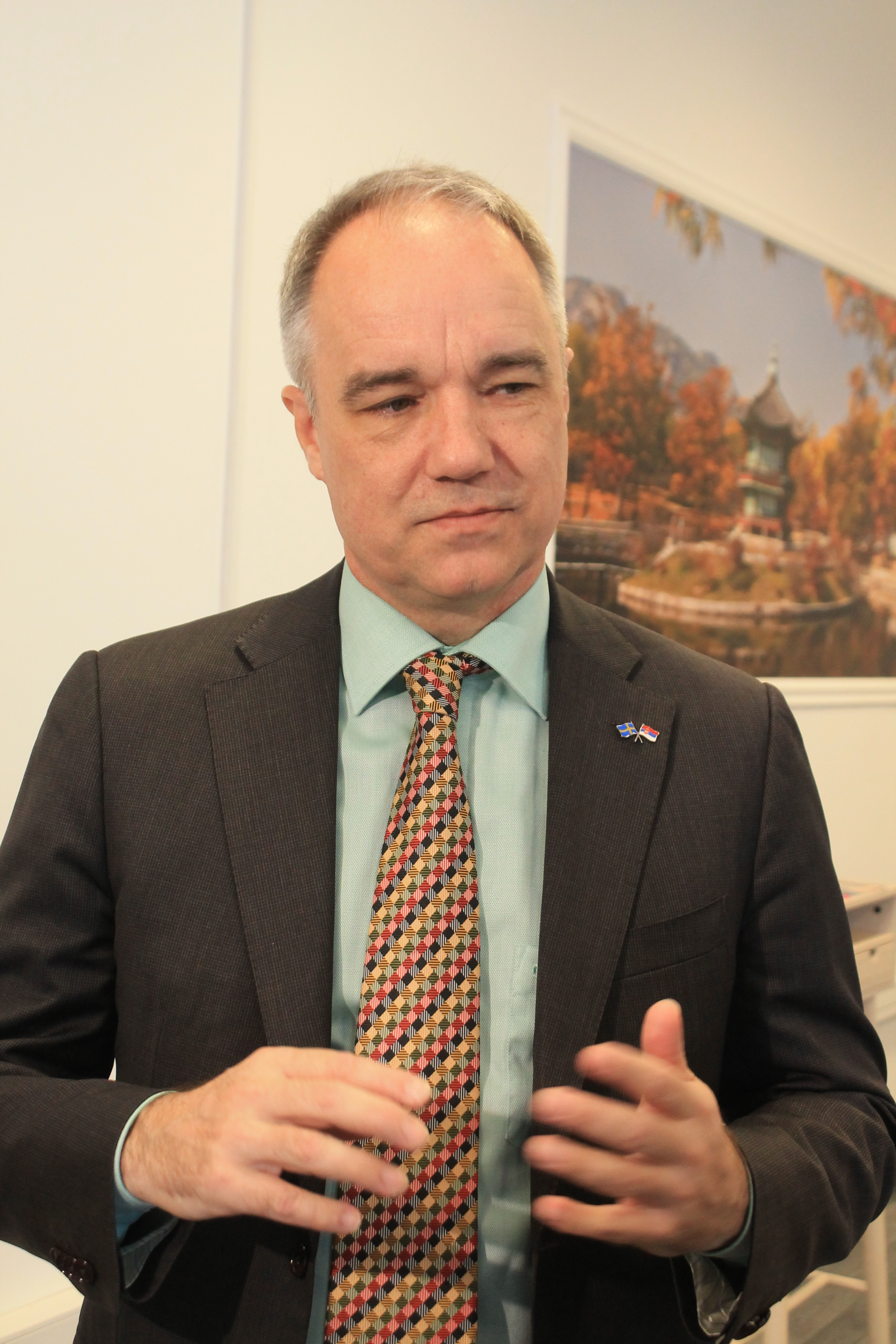
- Incumbent; Jan Lundin since August 2026
- Ministry for Foreign Affairs; Swedish Embassy, Reykjavík
- Style: His or Her Excellency (formal); Mr. or Madam Ambassador (informal)
- Reports to: Minister for Foreign Affairs
- Residence: Fjólugata 9, Miðborg
- Seat: Reykjavík, Iceland
- Appointer: Government of Sweden
- Term length: No fixed term
- Inaugural holder: Otto Johansson
- Formation: 1940
- Website: Swedish Embassy, Reykjavík

The Ambassador of Sweden to Iceland (known formally as the Ambassador of the Kingdom of Sweden to Iceland) is the official representative of the government of Sweden to the president of Iceland and government of Iceland.

== History ==
Sweden and Iceland established diplomatic relations on 27 July 1940. The same month, Sweden's Consul General in Reykjavík, Otto Johansson, was appointed to serve as chargé d'affaires there for the time being. He was appointed as Sweden's first envoy to Iceland in 1946.

In 1956, an agreement was reached between the Swedish and Icelandic governments on the mutual elevation of the respective countries' legations to embassies. The diplomatic rank was thereafter changed to ambassador instead of envoy extraordinary and minister plenipotentiary. On February 17, Sweden's then envoy there, Sten von Euler-Chelpin, was appointed ambassador. He presented his credentials as ambassador to Iceland's president, Ásgeir Ásgeirsson, on 28 February.

== List of representatives ==
Name	Period	Title	Notes	Presented credentials	Ref
Kingdom of Iceland (1918–1944)
Otto Johansson	1940–1944	Chargé d'affaires	Also consul general		
Republic of Iceland (1944–present)
Otto Johansson	1944–1946	Chargé d'affaires	Also consul general		
Otto Johansson	1946–1947	Envoy			
Harald Pousette	1947–1951	Envoy			
Leif Öhrvall	1951–1953	Chargé d'affaires			
Leif Öhrvall	1953–1955	Envoy			
Sten von Euler-Chelpin	1955 – 16 February 1955	Envoy			
Sten von Euler-Chelpin	17 February 1956 – 1961	Ambassador		28 February 1956	
August von Hartmansdorff	1962–1965	Ambassador			
Gunnar Granberg	1965–1972	Ambassador			
Olof Kaijser	1972–1978	Ambassador			
Ethel Wiklund	1978–1983	Ambassador			
Gunnar-Axel Dahlström	1983–1987	Ambassador			
Per Olof Forshell	1987–1991	Ambassador	Died in office		
Göte Magnusson	1992–1994	Ambassador			
Pär Kettis	1994–1998	Ambassador			
Herman af Trolle	1999–2002	Ambassador			
Bertil Jobeus	2002–2005	Ambassador			
Madeleine Ströje-Wilkens	2005–2009	Ambassador			
Anders Ljunggren	2009–2013	Ambassador			
Bosse Hedberg	2013–2017	Ambassador			
Håkan Juholt	2017–2020	Ambassador			
Pär Ahlberger	20 September 2020 – 2024	Ambassador			
Louise Calais	2024–2026	Ambassador			
Jan Lundin	August 2026 – present	Ambassador			

== See also ==
- Iceland–Sweden relations
