= Martin Kastengren =

Swedish diplomat (1891–1972)

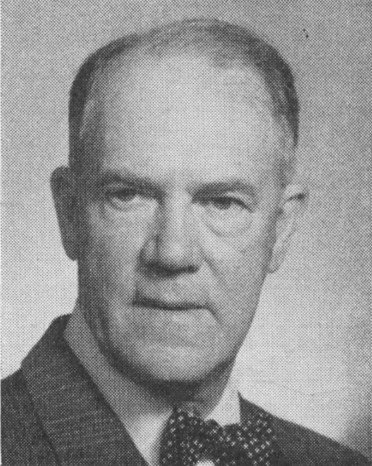
- Born: Johan Martin Kastengren; 7 June 1891; Eskilstuna, Sweden
- Died: 22 February 1972 (aged 80); Danderyd, Sweden
- Education: Stockholm School of Economics; Stockholm University College
- Occupation: Diplomat
- Years active: 1916–1957
- Spouse: Gunny Jepson (m. 1922)

Johan Martin Kastengren (7 June 1891 – 22 February 1972), was a Swedish diplomat. He graduated from the Stockholm School of Economics and Stockholm University College before starting as an assistant lawyer. In 1917, he joined the Ministry for Foreign Affairs, where he served in various roles including attaché, vice-consul, and first legation secretary. He was appointed Consul General in Calcutta in 1931, and in New York City in 1935. Following a decade in the United States, he became Envoy to Lima in 1945, with additional accreditation to La Paz and Quito. In 1951, he was assigned as Envoy to Canberra with dual accreditation to Wellington. Kastengren retired on 30 June 1957, after a long career in international diplomacy.

== Early life ==
Kastengren was born on 7 June 1891 in Eskilstuna, Sweden, the son of the Provost August Kastengren and his wife Karolina (née Mellin). His cousin was the CEO of Svenska AB Philips, Herbert Kastengren (born 1896).

He passed studentexamen in Örebro in 1910. Kastengren graduated from the Stockholm School of Economics in 1912 and received a Candidate of Law degree from Stockholm University College in 1916. During his studies, he served on the board of the national organization of the Young Swedish Association (Ungsvenska förbundet) and was treasurer of the Stockholm University College Student Union.

== Career ==
Kastengren worked as an assistant lawyer at a law firm in Stockholm from 1916 to 1917, before being employed as an attaché at the Ministry for Foreign Affairs in 1917. He served at the Consulate General in New York City in 1918, was appointed vice-consul at the Ministry for Foreign Affairs in 1923 (acting vice-consul in 1919), and became the first legation secretary in Bern in 1923. On 30 June 1923, Vice-Consul Kastengren succeeded Consul Birger Johansson as the head of the Swedish consulate in Mariehamn, Åland. He then became first secretary at the Ministry for Foreign Affairs in 1924. From 1925 to 1928, he had a special assignment to draft regulations and instructions for foreign representations, and in 1930, he became the head of the legal office at the Ministry for Foreign Affairs (acting head in 1928).

In August 1931, Kastengren was appointed to temporarily hold the position of Consul General in Calcutta, replacing August Silfwerhielm (who was on sick leave), from 1 November 1931, until 30 January 1932. Thereafter, he continued as Consul General in Calcutta. In 1935, he was appointed Consul General in New York City. After spending 10 years in the United States, he was appointed Envoy to Lima in 1945, with dual accreditation to La Paz and Quito. On 19 July 1946, he presented his credentials to Bolivia's President Gualberto Villarroel, two days before the latter was assassinated in the presidential palace.

In 1951, he was appointed Envoy to Canberra with dual accreditation to Wellington. On 25 October 1951, Kastengren presented his credentials to the acting Governor-General, Sir John Northcott. After six years in Australia, Kastengren was granted retirement on 30 June 1957, and thus entered retirement.

== Personal life ==
In 1922, Kastengren married Gunny Jepson (11 June 1893 – 27 November 1972), the daughter of Gunnar Jepson and Anna Jepson. They had one son named Bengt Kastengren (1924–2014), CEO of the insurance company Återförsäkrings AB Atlas.

== Death ==
Kastengren died on 22 February 1972 at Danderyd Hospital in Stockholm County. His wife died later that same year.

He was interred in the family grave at Knista Cemetery in Knista Parish, Örebro County.

== Awards and decorations ==
=== Swedish ===
- (Sweden) Commander Grand Cross of the Order of the Polar Star (6 June 1957)
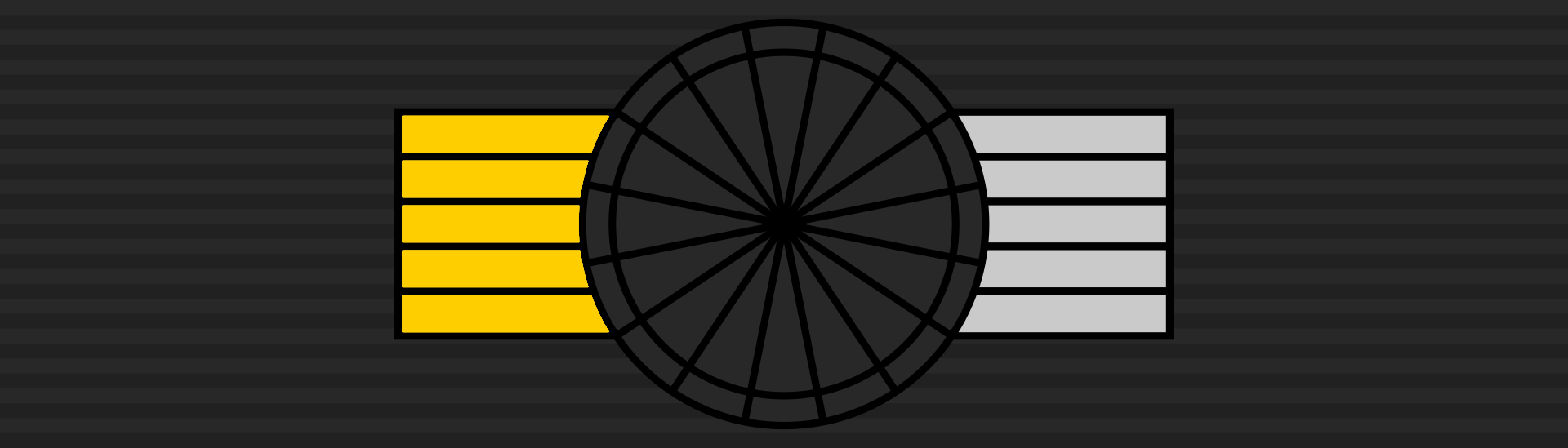
- (Sweden) Commander 1st Class of the Order of the Polar Star (6 June 1944)
- (Sweden) Commander of the Order of the Polar Star (22 November 1935)
- (Sweden) Knight of the Order of the Polar Star (1931)

=== Foreign ===
- (Peru) Grand Cross of the Order of Merit for Distinguished Services (Orden al Mérito por Servicios Distinguidos) (25 September 1952)
- (Empire of Japan) Order of the Rising Sun, 2nd Class
- (Hungary) Grand Officer of the Hungarian Order of Merit
- (France) Commander of the Order of the Black Star
- (Norway) Commander of the Order of St. Olav
- (Spain) Commander of the Order of Civil Merit
- (Belgium) Officer of the Order of the Crown
- (Hungary) Officer of the Hungarian Order of Merit

== Honours ==
- Honorary juris doctor, Upsala College, New Jersey (1944)

Diplomatic posts
Preceded by August Silfwerhielm	Consul General of Sweden to Calcutta; 1931–1935	Succeeded by Gustaf Löwenhard
Preceded by Gustaf Weidel	Consul General of Sweden to New York City; 1935–1945	Succeeded by Lennart Nylander
Preceded by Gunnar Reuterskiöld	Envoy of Sweden to Peru; 1945–1951	Succeeded by Harry Eriksson
Preceded by Gunnar Reuterskiöld	Envoy of Sweden to Bolivia; 1945–1951	Succeeded by Harry Eriksson
Preceded by Gunnar Reuterskiöld	Envoy of Sweden to Ecuador; 1945–1951	Succeeded by Brynolf Eng
Preceded by Constans Lundquist	Envoy of Sweden to Australia; 1951–1957	Succeeded by Carl Bergenstråhle
Preceded by None	Envoy of Sweden to New Zealand; 1951–1957	Succeeded by Hugo Ärnfast
