= Hugo Ärnfast =

Swedish diplomat (1908–1965)

- Born: Frans Hugo Ärnfast; 2 June 1908; Graninge, Sweden
- Died: 11 July 1965 (aged 57); Bogotá, Colombia
- Education: Stockholm School of Economics; Stockholm University College
- Occupation: Diplomat
- Years active: 1937–1965
- Spouse: Annemarie Brettel (m. 1940)
- Children: 3

Frans Hugo Ärnfast (2 June 1908 – 11 July 1965) was a Swedish diplomat. Ärnfast began his career working at the Swedish Dairies' Association and the Swedish Farmers' Meat Marketing Association before joining the Ministry for Foreign Affairs in 1937. He served in Berlin, Riga, and Prague before becoming a second secretary in 1941. During the final days of World War II, Ärnfast stayed in war-torn Berlin, helping fellow Swedes in the chaotic aftermath of the Battle of Berlin. He later held diplomatic roles in San Francisco, Washington, D.C., Wellington, and Karachi, eventually becoming ambassador to Bogotá in 1964. Ärnfast died in a drowning accident near Bogotá on 11 July 1965, after being swept away by strong currents while on a trip to a mountain village.

== Early life ==
Ärnfast was born on 2 June 1908 in Graninge, Västernorrland County, Sweden, the son of August Pettersson, a farmer, and his wife Helga Olsson. He earned a degree in economics from the Stockholm School of Economics in 1932 and obtained a Bachelor of Arts from Stockholm University College on 15 December 1936.

== Career ==
Ärnfast worked at the Swedish Dairies' Association (Svenska mejeriernas riksförening) from 1933 to 1935 and at the Swedish Farmers' Meat Marketing Association (Sveriges slakteriförbund) from 1936 to 1937. He joined the Ministry for Foreign Affairs as an attaché in 1937, serving in Berlin in 1938 and Riga in 1940. Later that year, he was appointed acting consul in Prague before returning to the ministry as an attaché. In 1941, he became second secretary at the Ministry for Foreign Affairs, serving in Berlin in 1944, and in 1945, he was promoted to first secretary at the legation there.

Ärnfast was one of the Swedes who, in 1945, remained in war-torn Berlin alongside envoy Arvid Richert and future ambassador Axel Lewenhaupt. They stayed in the legation bunker to assist fellow Swedes until the very end. When the Swedish personnel were forced to leave their post on 22 May, they had spent nearly three weeks helping the few remaining Swedes in the chaotic aftermath of the Battle of Berlin. For ten days, they endured complete isolation, experiencing relentless Russian artillery fire and continuous air raids. However, the bombproof bunker provided sufficient protection, and according to Ärnfast, they were never in real distress—supplies were ample, and morale remained high despite the uncertainty and psychological strain. As the Russian assault swept through Berlin's devastated quarters, where the last German defenders held out, the Swedes waited. Eventually, after the resistance was overcome, Soviet troops allowed them to continue their mission of assisting the remaining Swedes in the city.

He was appointed first secretary at the Ministry for Foreign Affairs in 1945, then served as first vice consul in San Francisco in 1948. In 1951, he became first secretary at the Swedish embassy in Washington, D.C., before returning to the ministry in 1952. The following year, he was promoted to director (byråchef) at the Foreign Ministry. From 1957 to 1960, he served as envoy to Wellington, and in 1960, he was appointed ambassador to Karachi. In October 1964, he became ambassador to Bogotá, with additional accreditation to Quito and Panama City.

== Personal life ==
In 1940, Ärnfast married Annemarie Brettel (1918–2007) from Germany, the daughter of Dr med Otto Brettel and Marie Eibach. They had three children: Torsten Ärnfast (1941–1976), Inger, and Bengt.

== Death ==
Ärnfast died in a drowning accident near Bogotá on 11 July 1965. He had driven to a mountain village in the outskirts of Bogotá, where he parked his car and left it by a river. It is believed that he was swept away by the strong currents. A few hours later, locals found his body two kilometers downstream from the site. Officially, it was reported that he had slipped from his boat during a fishing trip and drowned.

His funeral took place on 23 July 1965, at the Northern Crematorium. He was buried on 26 September 1965, at Norra Begravningsplatsen in Stockholm.

== Awards and decorations ==
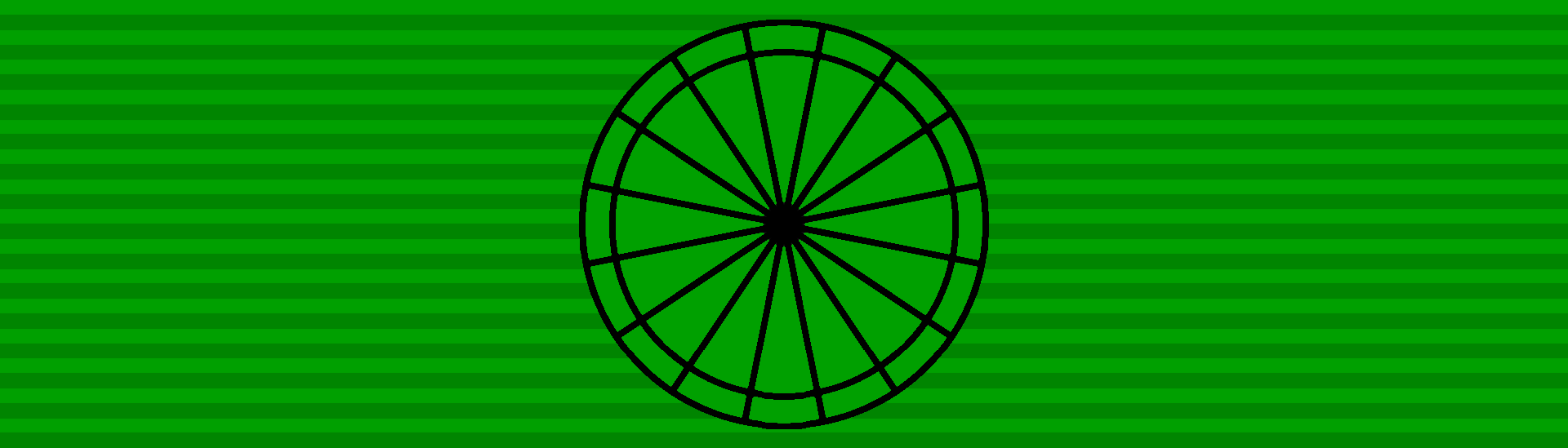
- (Sweden) Knight 1st Class of the Order of Vasa (15 November 1945)
- (Sweden) Knight of the Order of the Polar Star (6 June 1957)
- (Denmark) Commander of the Order of the Dannebrog

Diplomatic posts
Preceded by Martin Kastengren	Envoy of Sweden to New Zealand; 1957–1960	Succeeded by Olof Ripa
Preceded by Gösta Brunnström	Ambassador of Sweden to Pakistan; 1960–1964	Succeeded by Lennart Finnmark
Preceded by Curt Leijon	Ambassador of Sweden to Colombia; 1964–1965	Succeeded by Ingvar Grauers
Preceded by Curt Leijon	Ambassador of Sweden to Ecuador; 1960–1961	Succeeded by Ingvar Grauers
Preceded by Curt Leijon	Ambassador of Sweden to Panama; 1960–1961	Succeeded by Ingvar Grauers
